= XXXTentacion discography =

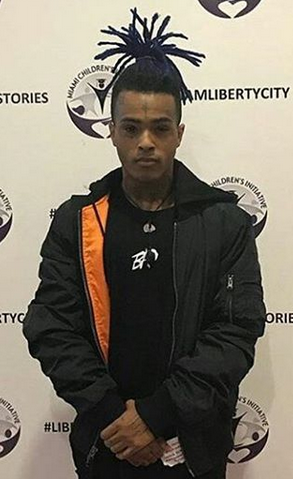
- XXXTentacion in 2018
- Studio albums: 4
- EPs: 10
- Compilation albums: 1
- Singles: 28
- Mixtapes: 6

XXXTentacion was an American rapper, singer-songwriter and record producer who released four studio albums (two of which were posthumous releases), one compilation album (which was released posthumously), two mixtapes, four collaborative mixtapes (one of which was a posthumous release), ten extended plays and 29 singles (including eight as a featured artist). As of June 2018, he sold more than 25 million album-equivalent units in the United States. XXXTentacion was awarded for sales of over 20 million records by the Recording Industry Association of America (RIAA). As of July 2026, he has 110 million certified sales in the United States.

XXXTentacion released his first track "News/Flock" in June 2013 on SoundCloud. His first official mixtape XXX (Unmastered) was released on March 5, 2014, but many tracks were later deleted. e.motion and XXX were his first EPs released on SoundCloud, but they were deleted quickly after being released and their exact tracklists are still unknown. Ice Hotel is the first full project that was made available to the public after its original deletion. In December 2015, XXXTentacion released his breakthrough single "Look at Me!", which received millions of plays on SoundCloud before being re-released through Empire Distribution in February 2017. The single peaked at number 34 on the Billboard Hot 100. It was later certified Platinum by the Recording Industry Association of America (RIAA). In May of the same year, he released his first commercial mixtape Revenge, which peaked at number 28 on the Billboard 200.

In August 2017, he released his debut studio album 17, which debuted at number 2 on the Billboard 200, with 87,000 album-equivalent units, of which 18,000 were pure sales. The album spawned three singles: the gold-certified "Revenge" and the 8× Platinum "Jocelyn Flores" and certified Platinum "Fuck Love" (featuring Trippie Redd). The album has also been certified platinum in Canada, Denmark and New Zealand. XXXTentacion posthumously won Favourite Soul/R&B Album for 17 at the 2018 American Music Awards. In December 2017, he released his tenth EP A Ghetto Christmas Carol. In March 2018, he released his second studio album ?, which debuted at number 1 on the Billboard 200, with 131,000 album-equivalent units, with 20,000 pure album sales. It was XXXTentacion's only US number-one album during his lifetime. The album spawned three singles: "Sad!", certified Diamond, "Changes" and "Moonlight", certified 3× Platinum and 6× Platinum, respectively, by the Recording Industry Association of America (RIAA). Following XXXTentacion's death on June 18, 2018, "Sad!" topped the Billboard Hot 100, where XXXTentacion became the first act to earn a posthumous Hot 100 number-one single as a lead artist since The Notorious B.I.G. with "Mo Money Mo Problems" in 1997.

In December 2018, his third studio album Skins was released, which debuted at number 1 on the US Billboard 200 with 132,000 album-equivalent units, of which 52,000 were pure album sales. The album spawned one single: "Bad!", which is certified Diamond. The album has been certified gold by the Recording Industry Association of America (RIAA) for sales of 500,000 units in the US. In December 2019, his fourth and final studio album Bad Vibes Forever was released, which debuted at number 5 on the US Billboard 200 with 65,000 album-equivalent units. The album spawned three singles: "Royalty", "Hearteater" and "Bad Vibes Forever". In June 2020, XXXTentacion's song "Riot" was re-released posthumously for streaming services on June 1, 2020, amid the George Floyd protests.

In January 2022, XXXTentacion's song "Vice City" was re-released on all streaming platforms. In May 2022, a collaboration song with Kanye West "True Love" was released, from West's demo album Donda 2. Following its release as a single, "True Love" debuted at number 22 on the US Billboard Hot 100, with 12.7 million streams. It generated 1.8 million in radio audience from airplay and sold 3,000 downloads, entering the US R&B/Hip-Hop Digital Song Sales chart at number six. The song debuted at number five on the US Hot R&B/Hip-Hop Songs chart, becoming West's 39th top 10 on the chart and XXXTentacion's fifth. In June 2022, Look at Me: The Album would release, the album was announced alongside a documentary of the same name. Look at Me was supported by two singles: "Vice City" and "True Love", both of which were announced early on that they would be appearing on streaming music services such as Spotify, both of which were previously absent mostly due to sample clearance problems. In September 2023, his fourth extended play ItWasntEnough (2016) would be re-released to all streaming platforms.

== Albums ==
=== Studio albums ===
List of studio albums, with chart positions, sales figures and certifications
Title	Album details	Peak chart positions										Sales	Certifications
Title	Album details	US	US R&B /HH	AUS	CAN	DEN	ITA	NOR	NZ	SWE	UK	Sales	Certifications
17	Released: August 25, 2017; Label: Bad Vibes Forever, Empire; Format: CD, LP, streaming, digital download	2	2	29	2	2	3	1	2	2	11	US: 18,000	RIAA: 3× Platinum; BPI: Platinum; IFPI DEN: Platinum; FIMI: Gold; MC: Platinum; RMNZ: Platinum
?	Released: March 16, 2018; Label: Bad Vibes Forever, Empire, Caroline, Capitol; Format: CD, LP, streaming, digital download,	1	1	2	1	1	2	1	1	1	3	US: 20,000 (first week)	RIAA: 6× Platinum; ARIA: Gold; BPI: 2× Platinum; FIMI: Platinum; GLF: Platinum; IFPI DEN: 3× Platinum; IFPI NOR: 2× Platinum; MC: Platinum; RMNZ: 2× Platinum
Skins	Released: December 7, 2018; Label: Bad Vibes Forever, Empire; Format: CD, LP, streaming, digital download	1	1	8	4	5	42	1	9	1	29	US: 52,000	RIAA: Gold; BPI: Silver
Bad Vibes Forever	Released: December 6, 2019; Label: Bad Vibes Forever, Empire; Format: CD, LP, streaming audio, digital download	5	3	—	11	15	70	15	25	—	53	US: 18,000 (first week)	BPI: Silver
"—" denotes a recording that did not chart or was not released in that territory.

== Compilation albums ==
List of compilation albums
Title	Album details	Peak chart positions							Certifications
Title	Album details	US	US R&B /HH	AUS	CAN	NOR	NZ	UK	Certifications
Look at Me: The Album	Released: June 10, 2022; Label: Bad Vibes Forever, Columbia; Format: CD, streaming, digital download	17	11	15	11	19	7	23	BPI: Platinum; RMNZ: Platinum

== Mixtapes ==
List of mixtapes, with selected details
Title	Mixtape details	Peak chart positions					Certifications
Title	Mixtape details	US	US R&B /HH	CAN	DEN	SWE	Certifications
XXX (Unmastered)	Released: March 5, 2014; Label: Self-released; Format: Digital download	—	—	—	—	—	
Revenge	Released: May 16, 2017; Label: Empire; Format: Streaming, digital download	28	15	36	31	42	RIAA: Gold; BPI: Gold
"—" denotes a recording that did not chart or was not released in that territory.

== Collaborative mixtapes and albums ==
List of mixtapes and albums, with selected details
Title	Mixtape details	Peak chart positions									
Title	Mixtape details	US	US R&B /HH	CAN	DEN	NLD	FIN	FRA	NOR	NZ	SWI
Members Only, Vol.1! (with Ski Mask the Slump God)	Released: April 20, 2015; Label: Self-released; Format: Digital download	—	—	—	—	—	—	—	—	—	—
Members Only, Vol. 2 (as part of Members Only)	Released: October 23, 2015; Label: Self-released; Format: Digital download	—	—	—	—	—	—	—	—	—	—
Members Only, Vol. 3 (as part of Members Only)	Released: June 26, 2017; Label: Empire; Format: LP, streaming audio, Digital download	—	—	—	—	127	—	—	—	—	—
Members Only, Vol. 4 (as part of Members Only)	Released: January 23, 2019; Label: Empire; Format: LP, streaming audio, Digital download	18	11	15	25	39	48	100	32	29	71
"—" denotes a recording that did not chart or was not released in that territory.

== Extended plays ==
List of extended plays, with selected details
Title	EP details	Peak chart positions	
Title	EP details	US Ind.	NZ Heat.
e.motion	Released: April 30, 2014; Label: Self-released; Format: Digital download	—	—
XXX	Released: April 30, 2014; Label: Self-released; Format: Digital download	—	—
Ice Hotel	Released: May 11, 2014; Label: Self-released; Format: Digital download	—	—
The Nobodys	Released: July 11, 2014; Label: Self-released; Format: Digital download	—	—
The Fall	Released: November 21, 2014; Label: Self-released; Format: Digital download	—	—
♡ ^{r a r e} ♡	Released: December 1, 2014; Label: Self-released; Format: Digital download	—	—
Heartbreak Hotel	Released: February 3, 2015; Label: Self-released; Format: Digital download	—	—
ItWasntEnough	Original release: Released: March 18, 2016; Label: Self-released; Format: Digital download; Re-release: Released: September 8, 2023; Label: Bad Vibes Forever, Columbia; Format: Streaming, digital download	—	—
Willy Wonka Was a Child Murderer	Released: April 28, 2016; Label: Self-released; Format: Digital download	—	—
A Ghetto Christmas Carol	Released: December 11, 2017; Label: Bad Vibes Forever, Caroline, Capitol; Format: Streaming, digital download	35	2
"—" denotes a recording that did not chart or was not released in that territory.

== Singles ==
=== As lead artist ===
List of singles as lead artist, with chart positions and certifications, showing year released and album name
Title	Year	Peak chart positions										Certifications	Album
Title	Year	US	US R&B /HH	US Rap	AUS	CAN	ITA	NZ	SWE	SWI	UK	Certifications	Album
"Look at Me!"	2015	34	18	12	—	33	98	—	79	50	96	RIAA: 5× Platinum; BPI: Gold; FIMI: Platinum; IFPI DEN: Gold; RMNZ: 3× Platinum	Revenge
"What in XXXTarnation" (featuring Ski Mask the Slump God)	2017	—	—	—	—	—	—	—	—	—	—		Members Only, Vol. 3
"Gospel" (with Rich Brian and Keith Ape)	2017	—	— (Note: "Gospel" did not enter the Billboard Hot R&B/Hip-Hop Songs chart, but peaked at number seven on the Bubbling Under R&B/Hip-Hop Singles chart.)	—	—	—	—	— (Note: "Gospel" did not enter the NZ Top 40 Singles Chart, but peaked at number four on the NZ Heatseeker Singles Chart.)	—	—	—	RIAA: Gold; RMNZ: Gold	Non-album single
"Revenge"	2017	77	37	—	—	80	69	— (Note: "Revenge" did not enter the NZ Top 40 Singles Chart, but peaked at number four on the NZ Heatseeker Singles Chart.)	—	—	—	RIAA: Gold; BPI: Platinum; RMNZ: 3× Platinum	17
"Jocelyn Flores"	2017	19	13	10	8	14	30	4	7	21	39	RIAA: 8× Platinum; BPI: Platinum; FIMI: Platinum; IFPI DEN: Platinum; RMNZ: 6× Platinum	17
"Fuck Love" (featuring Trippie Redd)	2018	28	18	—	—	31	63	19	35	48	89	RIAA: 11× Platinum; BPI: 2× Platinum; FIMI: Platinum; IFPI DEN: Gold; RMNZ: 3× Platinum	17
"Sad!"	2018	1	1	1	4	2	17	3	3	4	5	RIAA: Diamond; ARIA: 5× Platinum; BPI: 2× Platinum; FIMI: Platinum; GLF: 2× Platinum; IFPI DEN: Platinum; MC: 3× Platinum; RMNZ: 5× Platinum	?
"Changes"	2018	18	12	—	15	15	33	11	6	9	22	RIAA: 5× Platinum; ARIA: 3× Platinum; BPI: Gold; FIMI: Platinum; GLF: Platinum; MC: Platinum; RMNZ: 3× Platinum	?
"Moonlight"	2018	13	9	8	—	10	32	8	13	11	17	RIAA: 9× Platinum; BPI: 2× Platinum; FIMI: Platinum; GLF: Platinum; MC: Platinum; RMNZ: 4× Platinum	?
"Falling Down" (with Lil Peep)	2018	13	—	—	7	5	29	1	1	9	10	RIAA: 4× Platinum; ARIA: Platinum; BPI: Platinum; FIMI: Gold; RMNZ: 3× Platinum	Come Over When You're Sober, Pt. 2
"Arms Around You" (with Lil Pump featuring Maluma and Swae Lee)	2018	28	16	—	14	13	13	15	8	5	14	RIAA: Platinum; ARIA: Platinum; BPI: Gold; FIMI: Gold; IFPI DEN: Gold; RMNZ: Platinum	Non-album single
"Bad!"	2018	16	7	7	31	10	74	25	21	29	23	RIAA: Platinum; BPI: Silver; RMNZ: Platinum	Skins
"Run It Back!" (with Craig Xen)	2019	—	—	—	—	—	—	— (Note: "Run It Back!" did not enter the NZ Top 40 Singles Chart, but peaked at number 30 on the NZ Hot Singles Chart.)	—	—	—		Broken Kids Club
"Royalty" (featuring Ky-Mani Marley, Stefflon Don, and Vybz Kartel)	2019	—	— (Note: "Royalty" did not enter the Billboard Hot R&B/Hip-Hop Songs chart, but peaked at number ten on the Bubbling Under R&B/Hip-Hop Singles chart.)	—	—	—	—	— (Note: "Royalty" did not enter the NZ Top 40 Singles Chart, but peaked at number eight on the NZ Hot Singles Chart.)	—	—	—		Bad Vibes Forever
"#ProudCatOwnerRemix" (featuring Rico Nasty)	2019	—	—	—	—	—	—	— (Note: "#ProudCatOwnerRemix" did not enter the NZ Top 40 Singles Chart, but peaked at number 25 on the NZ Hot Singles Chart.)	—	—	—		? (Deluxe)
"Hearteater"	2019	—	—	—	—	—	—	— (Note: "Hearteater" did not enter the NZ Top 40 Singles Chart, but peaked at number 36 on the NZ Hot Singles Chart.)	—	—	—		Bad Vibes Forever
"Bad Vibes Forever" (featuring PnB Rock and Trippie Redd)	2019	85	39	—	—	85	—	— (Note: "Bad Vibes Forever" did not enter the NZ Top 40 Singles Chart, but peaked at number 10 on the NZ Hot Singles Chart.)	—	—	—	BPI: Silver; RMNZ: Gold	Bad Vibes Forever
"Riot"	2020	—	—	—	—	—	—	— (Note: "Riot" did not enter the NZ Top 40 Singles Chart, but peaked at number 1 on the NZ Hot Singles Chart.)	—	—	—	BPI: Silver; RMNZ: Platinum	Non-album single
"Vice City" (Note: Originally released in 2014 on Soundcloud. Re-Released in 2022)	2022	89	32	20	—	—	—	— (Note: "Vice City" did not enter the NZ Top 40 Singles Chart, but peaked at number five on the NZ Hot Singles Chart.)	—	—	—	RIAA: Gold; RMNZ: Gold	Look at Me: The Album
"True Love" (with Kanye West) (Note: "True Love" is also included on Kanye West's eleventh studio album Donda 2.)	2022	22	5	4	21	21	—	19	64	39	31	BPI: Silver; RMNZ: Gold	Look at Me: The Album
"WitDemDicks" (Note: Originally released in 2015 on Soundcloud. Re-Released in 2022)	2022	—	—	—	—	—	—	—	—	—	—		Non-album singles
"I'm Not Human" (with Lil Uzi Vert)	2023	—	—	—	—	—	—	— (Note: "I'm Not Human" did not enter the NZ Top 40 Singles Chart, but peaked at number 21 on the NZ Hot Singles Chart.)	—	—	—		Non-album singles
"Very Rare Forever Freestyle" (Note: Originally released in 2015 on Soundcloud. Re-Released in 2023)	2023	—	—	—	—	—	—	—	—	—	—		Non-album singles
"Let's Pretend We're Numb" (Note: Originally released in 2015. Re-Released in 2023)	2023	—	—	—	—	—	—	—	—	—	—		Non-album singles
"Emoji" (with Ronny J)	2023	—	—	—	—	—	—	—	—	—	—		Charged Up
"Teeth (Interlude)" (Note: Originally released in 2015. Re-Released in 2024)	2024	—	—	—	—	—	—	—	—	—	—		Non-album singles
"Whoa (Mind in Awe)" (Remix) (with Juice Wrld)	2025	— (Note: "Whoa (Mind in Awe)" (remix) did not enter the Billboard Hot 100, but peaked at number 16 on the Bubbling Under Hot 100 chart.)	25	16	—	—	—	— (Note: "Whoa (Mind in Awe)" (Remix) did not enter the NZ Top 40 Singles Chart, but peaked at number 9 on the NZ Hot Singles Chart.)	—	—	—		Non-album singles
"The Way" (with Juice Wrld)	2025	—	—	—	—	—	—	— (Note: "The Way" did not enter the NZ Top 40 Singles Chart, but peaked at number 29 on the NZ Hot Singles Chart.)	—	—	—		Legends Never Die (5th Anniversary Edition)
"Broly" (with Ski Mask the Slump God)	2025	—	—	—	—	—	—	—	—	—	—		The Lost Files
"Fatality" (with Ski Mask the Slump God)	2025	—	—	—	—	—	—	—	—	—	—		The Lost Files
"IWatchedHimDrown" (with Ski Mask the Slump God)	2025	—	—	—	—	—	—	—	—	—	—		The Lost Files
"—" denotes a recording that did not chart or was not released in that territory.

=== As featured artist ===
List of singles as featured artist, with chart positions and certifications, showing year released and album name
Title	Year	Peak chart positions					Certifications	Album
Title	Year	US	US R&B /HH	US Rap	CAN	NZ Heat.	Certifications	Album
"Bodies" (Cracka Paul featuring XXXTentacion and Lxrd Hippy)	2016	—	—	—	—	—		Non-album single
"Take a Step Back" (Ski Mask the Slump God featuring XXXTentacion)	2016	—	—	—	—	—	RIAA: 2× Platinum; RMNZ: Platinum	Drown in Designer and YouWillRegret
"Str8 Shot" (Miami Tip featuring XXXTentacion)	2017	—	—	—	—	—		Non-album single
"Roll in Peace" (Kodak Black featuring XXXTentacion)	2017	31	16	14	64	—	RIAA: 9× Platinum; BPI: Silver; RMNZ: Platinum	Project Baby 2
"Again" (Noah Cyrus featuring XXXTentacion)	2017	— (Note: "Again" did not enter the Billboard Hot 100, but peaked at number 7 on the Bubbling Under Hot 100 Singles chart.)	—	—	91	6	RIAA: Platinum; MC: Gold; RMNZ: Platinum	Non-album singles
"My Girl (Remix)" (Sizzla featuring XXXTentacion)	2017	—	—	—	—	—		Non-album singles
"May I Flex" (Black Bag LA and Momoh featuring XXXTentacion)	2017	—	—	—	—	—		Non-album singles
"Banded Up" (Ronny J featuring XXXTentacion)	2018	—	—	—	—	—		OMGRonny
"Don't Cry" (Lil Wayne featuring XXXTentacion)	2019	5	4	4	19	— (Note: "Don't Cry" did not enter the NZ Top 40 Singles Chart, but peaked at number two on the NZ Hot Singles Chart.)	RIAA: Platinum	Tha Carter V
"Voices" (Skye featuring XXXTentacion)	2019	—	—	—	—	— (Note: "Voices" peaked at number 36 on the NZ Hot Singles Chart.)		Non-album single
"—" denotes a recording that did not chart or was not released in that territory.

== Other charted and certified songs ==
List of other charted and certified songs, with selected chart positions and certifications, showing year released and album name
Title	Year	Peak chart positions										Certifications	Album
Title	Year	US	US R&B /HH	US Rap	CAN	IRE	ITA	NZ	SWE	SWI	UK	Certifications	Album
"I Don't Wanna Do This Anymore"	2017	—	—	—	—	—	—	—	—	—	—	RIAA: 2× Platinum; BPI: Gold; RMNZ: 2× Platinum	Revenge
"Yung Bratz"	2017	—	—	—	—	—	—	—	—	—	—	BPI: Silver; RMNZ: Platinum	Revenge
"RIP Roach" (featuring Ski Mask the Slump God)	2017	—	—	—	—	—	—	—	—	—	—	RMNZ: Gold	Revenge
"Curse" (Bass Santana featuring XXXTentacion, Cooliecut and Kin$oul)	2017	—	—	—	—	—	—	—	—	—	—	RMNZ: Gold	Members Only, Vol. 3
"Everybody Dies in Their Nightmares"	2017	42	22	19	34	37	56	— (Note: "Everybody Dies in Their Nightmares" did not enter the NZ Top 40 Singles Chart, but peaked at number one on the NZ Heatseeker Singles Chart.)	33	54	88	RIAA: 3× Platinum; BPI: Platinum; FIMI: Platinum; IFPI DEN: Gold; RMNZ: 3× Platinum	17
"Depression & Obsession"	2017	91	46	—	93	—	87	—	—	—	—	BPI: Silver; RMNZ: Platinum	17
"Save Me"	2017	94	48	—	—	—	95	—	—	—	—	BPI: Silver; RMNZ: Platinum	17
"Carry On"	2017	95	49	—	100	—	—	—	—	—	—	RIAA: Platinum; BPI: Silver; RMNZ: Platinum	17
"Orlando"	2017	— (Note: "Orlando" did not enter the Billboard Hot 100, but peaked at number 10 on the Bubbling Under Hot 100 Singles chart.)	— (Note: "Orlando" did not enter the Billboard Hot R&B/Hip-Hop Songs chart, but peaked at number five on the Bubbling Under R&B/Hip-Hop Singles chart.)	—	—	—	—	—	—	—	—	RMNZ: Gold	17
"Dead Inside (Interlude)"	2017	— (Note: "Dead Inside (Interlude)" did not enter the Billboard Hot 100, but peaked at number 12 on the Bubbling Under Hot 100 Singles chart.)	— (Note: "Dead Inside (Interlude)" did not enter the Billboard Hot R&B/Hip-Hop Songs chart, but peaked at number seven on the Bubbling Under R&B/Hip-Hop Singles chart.)	—	—	—	—	—	—	—	—	—	17
"A Ghetto Christmas Carol"	2017	— (Note: "A Ghetto Christmas Carol" did not enter the Billboard Hot 100, but peaked at number 13 on the Bubbling Under Hot 100 Singles chart.)	— (Note: "A Ghetto Christmas Carol" did not enter the Billboard Hot R&B/Hip-Hop Songs chart, but peaked at number four on the Bubbling Under R&B/Hip-Hop Singles chart.)	—	—	—	—	— (Note: "A Ghetto Christmas Carol" did not enter the NZ Top 40 Singles Chart, but peaked at number 10 on the NZ Heatseeker Singles Chart.)	—	—	—	RIAA: Platinum; RMNZ: Gold	A Ghetto Christmas Carol
"Hate Will Never Win"	2017	—	—	—	—	—	—	—	—	—	—	RIAA: Gold; RMNZ: Gold	A Ghetto Christmas Carol
"Up Like an Insomniac (Freestyle)"	2017	—	—	—	—	—	—	—	—	—	—	RIAA: Gold	A Ghetto Christmas Carol
"Alone, Part 3"	2018	— (Note: "Alone, Part 3" did not enter the Billboard Hot 100, but peaked at number six on the Bubbling Under Hot 100 Singles chart.)	50	—	80	—	—	—	—	—	—	RIAA: Platinum; RMNZ: Gold	?
"The Remedy for a Broken Heart (Why Am I So in Love)"	2018	55	26	22	46	50	67	— (Note: "The Remedy for a Broken Heart (Why Am I So in Love)" did not enter the NZ Top 40 Singles Chart, but peaked at number one on the NZ Heatseeker Singles Chart.)	41	36	53	RIAA: 5× Platinum; BPI: Platinum; MC: Gold; RMNZ: 2× Platinum	?
"Floor 555"	2018	—	—	—	—	—	—	—	—	—	—	RIAA: Platinum; RMNZ: Gold	?
"Numb"	2018	80	—	—	58	72	—	—	89	—	—	RIAA: 3× Platinum; BPI: Gold; RMNZ: Platinum	?
"Infinity (888)" (featuring Joey Badass)	2018	83	36	—	54	69	—	— (Note: "Infinity (888)" did not enter the NZ Top 40 Singles Chart, but peaked at number three on the NZ Heatseeker Singles Chart.)	— (Note: "Infinity (888)" did not enter the Swedish Singellista chart, but peaked at number six on the Swedish Heatseeker chart.)	—	—	RIAA: 2× Platinum; BPI: Silver; RMNZ: Platinum	?
"Going Down!"	2018	95	41	—	81	94	—	—	—	—	—	RIAA: Platinum; RMNZ: Gold	?
"$$$" (with Matt Ox)	2018	— (Note: "$$$" did not enter the Billboard Hot 100, but peaked at number two on the Bubbling Under Hot 100 Singles chart.)	45	—	92	—	—	—	—	—	—	RIAA: Platinum; RMNZ: Gold	?
"Love Yourself (interlude)"	2018	—	—	—	—	—	—	—	—	—	—	RIAA: Gold	?
"Smash!" (featuring PnB Rock)	2018	— (Note: "Smash!" did not enter the Billboard Hot 100, but peaked at number 24 on the Bubbling Under Hot 100 Singles chart.)	— (Note: "Smash!" did not enter the Billboard Hot R&B/Hip-Hop Songs chart, but peaked at number eight on the Bubbling Under R&B/Hip-Hop Singles chart.)	—	—	—	—	—	—	—	—	RIAA: Gold	?
"I Don't Even Speak Spanish LOL" (featuring Rio Santana, Judah and Carlos Andrez)	2018	— (Note: "I Don't Even Speak Spanish LOL" did not enter the Billboard Hot 100, but peaked at number 13 on the Bubbling Under Hot 100 Singles chart.)	— (Note: "I Don't Even Speak Spanish LOL" did not enter the Billboard Hot R&B/Hip-Hop Songs chart, but peaked at number three on the Bubbling Under R&B/Hip-Hop Singles chart.)	—	84	89	—	—	—	—	—	RIAA: Platinum; RMNZ: Gold	?
"Hope"	2018	70	35	—	68	91	—	—	84	99	—	RIAA: 6× Platinum; BPI: Platinum; RMNZ: 3× Platinum	?
"Schizophrenia"	2018	—	—	—	—	—	—	—	—	—	—	RIAA: Gold	?
"Before I Close My Eyes"	2018	—	—	—	—	—	—	—	—	—	—	RIAA: Platinum; RMNZ: Gold	?
"Guardian Angel"	2018	48	17	14	43	26	91	— (Note: "Guardian Angel" did not enter the NZ Top 40 Singles Chart, but peaked at number three on the NZ Hot Singles Chart.)	73	—	44		Skins
"Train Food"	2018	64	27	24	72	—	—	—	— (Note: "Train Food" did not enter the Swedish Singellista Chart, but peaked at number 19 on the Swedish Heatseeker Chart.)	—	—		Skins
"Whoa (Mind in Awe)"	2018	37	15	—	32	18	77	27	44	44	37	RIAA: Platinum; RMNZ: Platinum	Skins
"Staring at the Sky"	2018	68	—	—	85	—	—	—	—	—	—		Skins
"One Minute" (featuring Kanye West and Travis Barker)	2018	62	—	23	69	—	—	—	— (Note: "One Minute" did not enter the Swedish Singellista Chart, but peaked at number 18 on the Swedish Heatseeker Chart.)	—	—		Skins
"Difference" (Interlude)	2018	84	36	—	96	—	—	—	—	—	—		Skins
"I Don't Let Go"	2018	51	19	16	57	—	—	— (Note: "I Don't Let Go" did not enter the NZ Top 40 Singles Chart, but peaked at number four on the NZ Hot Singles Chart.)	— (Note: "I Don't Let Go" did not enter the Swedish Singellista Chart, but peaked at number two on the Swedish Heatseeker Chart.)	—	—	RIAA: Gold	Skins
"What Are You So Afraid Of"	2018	65	—	—	71	—	—	— (Note: "What Are You So Afraid Of" did not enter the NZ Top 40 Singles Chart, but peaked at number five on the NZ Hot Singles Chart.)	— (Note: "What Are You So Afraid Of" did not enter the Swedish Singellista Chart, but peaked at number 14 on the Swedish Heatseeker Chart.)	—	—		Skins
"Scared Of The Dark" (Lil Wayne and Ty Dolla Sign featuring XXXTentacion)	2018	—	—	—	—	—	—	—	—	—	—	BPI: Silver; RMNZ: Gold	Spider-Man: Into the Spider-Verse
"Sauce!"	2019	89	41	—	71	—	—	— (Note: "Sauce!" did not enter the NZ Top 40 Singles Chart, but peaked at number 12 on the NZ Hot Singles Chart.)	—	—	—	RIAA: Gold	Members Only, Vol. 4
"Make Eem Run!" (with Bass Santana and Ski Mask the Slump God)	2019	—	—	—	—	—	—	— (Note: "Make Eem Run!" did not enter the NZ Top 40 Singles Chart, but peaked at number 16 on the NZ Hot Singles Chart.)	—	—	—		Members Only, Vol. 4
"Touch Eem Body" (with Bass Santana, Kin$oul and Reddz)	2019	—	—	—	—	—	—	— (Note: "Touch Eem Body" did not enter the NZ Top 40 Singles Chart, but peaked at number 37 on the NZ Hot Singles Chart.)	—	—	—		Members Only, Vol. 4
"Gassed Up!" (with Flyboy Tarantino, Kid Trunks, Bass Santana and Kin$oul)	2019	—	—	—	—	—	—	— (Note: "Gassed Up!" did not enter the NZ Top 40 Singles Chart, but peaked at number 40 on the NZ Hot Singles Chart.)	—	—	—		Members Only, Vol. 4
"Middle Child" (with PnB Rock)	2019	91	37	—	—	—	—	—	—	—	—		TrapStar Turnt PopStar
"Ex Bitch"	2019	— (Note: "Ex Bitch" did not enter the Billboard Hot 100, but peaked at number one on the Bubbling Under Hot 100 Singles chart.)	—	—	—	—	—	— (Note: "Ex Bitch" did not enter the NZ Top 40 Singles Chart, but peaked at number eight on the NZ Hot Singles Chart.)	—	—	—	RMNZ: Gold	Bad Vibes Forever
"Ugly"	2019	—	—	—	—	—	—	— (Note: "Ugly" did not enter the NZ Top 40 Singles Chart, but peaked at number 28 on the NZ Hot Singles Chart.)	—	—	—		Bad Vibes Forever
"School Shooters" (featuring Lil Wayne)	2019	—	—	—	—	—	—	— (Note: "School Shooters" did not enter the NZ Top 40 Singles Chart, but peaked at number 26 on the NZ Hot Singles Chart.)	—	—	—		Bad Vibes Forever
"Triumph"	2019	—	—	—	—	—	—	— (Note: "Triumph" did not enter the NZ Top 40 Singles Chart, but peaked at number 21 on the NZ Hot Singles Chart.)	—	—	—		Bad Vibes Forever
"Danny Phantom" (Trippie Redd featuring XXXTentacion)	2021	92	34	25	—	—	—	—	—	—	—		Trip at Knight
"King of the Dead"	2022	—	—	—	—	—	—	— (Note: "King of the Dead" did not enter the NZ Top 40 Singles Chart, but peaked at number 40 on the NZ Hot Singles Chart.)	—	—	—		Look at Me: The Album
"#ImSippinTeaInYoHood"	2022	—	—	—	—	—	—	— (Note: "#ImSippinTeaInYoHood" did not enter the NZ Top 40 Singles Chart, but peaked at number 38 on the NZ Hot Singles Chart.)	—	—	—		Look at Me: The Album
"—" denotes a recording that did not chart or was not released in that territory.

== Other guest appearances ==
List of non-single guest appearances, with other performing artists, showing year released and album name
Title	Year	Other performer(s)	Album
"Crush"	2015	Fuckboy Tay	—N/a
"FukEmWeBall"	2015	Santz	—N/a
"Hit the Dirt"	2016	Yoshi Thompkins	—N/a
"SpaceGhostPussy (R.I.P. Yams)"	2016	Ronny J, Lofty 305, Denzel Curry, Ski Mask the Slump God	—N/a
"Purrposely"	2016	Denzel Curry	—N/a
"Emoji"	2016	Ronny J	—N/a
"Live Off a Lick"	2016	Smokepurpp	—N/a
"Innadat"	2016	Robb Banks	C2: Death of My Teenage
"Show Time"	2017	Juicy J	Highly Intoxicated
"Crucify Thy Infant, Son of Whore"	2017	Craig Xen	Voltage
"H2O"	2018	Ski Mask the Slump God	YouWillRegret
"Uptown / Bustdown"	2018	A Boogie wit da Hoodie, PnB Rock, Lil Durk	Hoodie SZN
"Don't Cry"	2018	Lil Wayne	Tha Carter V
"XXXTentacion Interlude"	2019	Yung Bans	Misunderstood
"Ready Set Go"	2019	Yung Bans, 03 Greedo	Misunderstood
"Get Outta My Head"	2020	Lil Wayne	Funeral
"Selfish"	2022	Kanye West	Donda 2
"May I"	2022	Robb Banks, Ski Mask the Slump God	Falconia
"X & Cud"	2024	Kid Cudi	Insano
"Jah's Interlude"	2024	Ski Mask the Slump God	11th Dimension

== Production discography ==
List of production (songwriting and arrangement) and non-performing songwriting credits (excluding guest appearances, interpolations, and samples). Only commercially available tracks are listed here.
Track(s)	Year	Credit	Artist(s)	Album
"The Explanation"	2017	Producer	XXXTentacion	17
"Depression & Obsession"	2017	Producer	XXXTentacion	17
"Revenge"	2017	Producer	XXXTentacion	17
"Dead Inside (Interlude)"	2017	Producer (with Natra Average)	XXXTentacion	17
"Orlando"	2017	Producer (with Tobias Jesso Jr.)	XXXTentacion	17
"Ayala (Outro)"	2017	Producer (with John Cunningham and Tobias Jesso Jr.)	XXXTentacion	17
"Up Like an Insomniac (Freestyle)"	2017	Producer (with Ronny J)	XXXTentacion	A Ghetto Christmas Carol
"Indecision"	2017	Producer (with John Cunningham and Robert Soukiasyan)	XXXTentacion	A Ghetto Christmas Carol
"Introduction (Instructions)"	2018	Producer	XXXTentacion	?
"The Remedy for a Broken Heart (Why Am I So in Love)"	2018	Producer (with John Cunningham)	XXXTentacion	?
"Pain = Best Friend" (featuring Travis Barker)	2018	Producer (with Travis Barker, John Cunningham and Robert Soukiasyan)	XXXTentacion	?
"Love Yourself (interlude)"	2018	Producer (with John Cunningham)	XXXTentacion	?
"Changes"	2018	Producer (with John Cunningham)	XXXTentacion	?
"Introduction"	2018	Producer	XXXTentacion	Skins
"Guardian Angel"	2018	Producer (with Potsu)	XXXTentacion	Skins
"Train Food"	2018	Producer (with John Cunningham)	XXXTentacion	Skins
"Staring at the Sky"	2018	Producer (with John Cunningham)	XXXTentacion	Skins
"Corey's Intro"	2019	Producer	Corey	Members Only, Vol. 4
"Introduction"	2019	Producer (with John Cunningham)	XXXTentacion	Bad Vibes Forever
"Ugly"	2019	Producer	XXXTentacion	Bad Vibes Forever
"Ecstasy" (featuring Noah Cyrus)	2019	Producer (with XXYYXX)	XXXTentacion	Bad Vibes Forever
"The Interlude That Never Ends"	2019	Producer	XXXTentacion	Bad Vibes Forever
"Chase/Glass Shards" (featuring Ikabod Veins)	2019	Producer	XXXTentacion	Bad Vibes Forever
"Numb the Pain"	2019	Producer (with John Cunningham)	XXXTentacion	Bad Vibes Forever
"Never"	2022 (Originally released in 2014 on SoundCloud)	Producer (with Aesthesys)	XXXTentacion	Look at Me: The Album
"Rare"	2022 (Originally released in 2014 on SoundCloud)	Producer (with Fifty Grand)	XXXTentacion	Look at Me: The Album
"Fuxk" (featuring Ski Mask the Slump God)	2022 (Originally released in 2015 on SoundCloud)	Producer (with Willie G)	XXXTentacion	Look at Me: The Album
"WingRiddenAngel"	2022 (Originally released in 2015 on SoundCloud)	Producer (with Kellbender)	XXXTentacion	Look at Me: The Album
"I Spoke to the Devil in Miami, He Said Everything Would Be Fine"	2022 (Originally released in 2016 on SoundCloud)	Producer (with JakesAlive and Ronny J)	XXXTentacion	Look at Me: The Album
"Depression & Obsession"	2024	Songwriter	Koe Wetzel	9 Lives
"Jah's Interlude" (with Ski Mask the Slump God)	2025	Producer	Ski Mask the Slump God	11th Dimension

== Music videos ==
=== As lead artist ===
List of music videos as lead artist, showing year released and directors
Title	Year	Director(s)
"Look at Me!/Riot"	2017	JMP, XXXTentacion
"Sad!"	2018	JMP, XXXTentacion
"Moonlight"	2018	JMP, XXXTentacion
"Arms Around You" (with Lil Pump featuring Swae Lee and Maluma)	2018	James Lerese
"Bad!"	2018	Tristan Zammit
"One Minute" (with Kanye West featuring Travis Barker)	2018	JJ Villard
"Sauce!"	2019	Tristan Zammit
"Falling Down" (with Lil Peep; Travis Barker Remix)	2019	Ramez Silyan
"Run It Back!" (with Craig Xen)	2019	JMP
"Middle Child" (with PnB Rock)	2019	Derek Pike
"Royalty" (featuring Ky-Mani Marley, Stefflon Don, and Vybz Kartel)	2019	Damian Fyffe
"Hearteater"	2019	JMP
"Bad Vibes Forever" (featuring PnB Rock and Trippie Redd)	2019	Eif Rivera
"Hot Gyal" (featuring Tory Lanez and Mavado)	2019	Damian Fyffe
"School Shooters" (featuring Lil Wayne)	2020	Eif Rivera
"Chase / Glass Shards" (featuring ikabodVEINS)	2020	Eif Rivera
"Whoa (Mind in Awe) [Remix]" (with Juice Wrld)	2025	JMP
"The Way" (with Juice Wrld)	2025	Steve Cannon and KDC Visions

=== As featured artist ===
List of music videos as featured artist, showing year released and directors
Title	Year	Director(s)
"Again" (Noah Cyrus featuring XXXTentacion)	2017	Noah Cyrus, Mike Weiss, Patrick Rohl
"Roll in Peace" (Kodak Black featuring XXXTentacion)	2018	AWGE
"Don't Cry" (Lil Wayne featuring XXXTentacion)	2019	Jay & Georgio Rodriguez
"Voices" (Skye featuring XXXTentacion)	2019	Pix3lface
