= Moonlight (XXXTentacion song) =

2018 song by XXXTentacion

Single by XXXTentacion

from the album ?
- Released: August 14, 2018
- Genre: Pop-trap; psychedelic rap
- Length: 2:15
- Label: Bad Vibes Forever; Virgin
- Songwriters: Jahseh Onfroy; John Cunningham
- Producer: John Cunningham

XXXTentacion singles chronology
"Changes" (2018)	"Moonlight" (2018)	"Falling Down" (2018)

Music video
- "Moonlight" on YouTube

"Moonlight" is a song by American rapper XXXTentacion from his second studio album ? (2018). Produced by John Cunningham, it was originally released as the third track of the album on March 16, 2018, before being posthumously sent to rhythmic radio as the album's third single on August 14, 2018. The song reached many chart positions globally, including a number 13 peak on the Billboard Hot 100 as well as a platinum certification following his death. It is tied with "Falling Down" (with Lil Peep) as his third-highest-charting song in the United States, with both songs falling behind "Sad!" and Lil Wayne's "Don't Cry".

== Music video ==
The official music video for "Moonlight" was released on the early night of October 1, 2018. The video was written and creative directed by Onfroy himself, and was also directed by JMP. The video features Onfroy and a large group of people at a get-together taking place in the woods after dark, lit by the light of a full moon. Onfroy is seen sitting by himself listening to headphones and observing the party, as well as walking through the crowd of people who are all dressed in black attire. He laughs as he watches people dance, and also exchanges stares with a mysterious curly-haired girl who is shown several times during the video (based on her appearance she has been theorized to represent Geneva Ayala, Onfroy's ex-girlfriend). Having been released after the rapper's passing, the video ends with the phrases "ENERGY NEVER DIES", "HE IS AMONGST US" and "LONG LIVE JAH" in tribute to Onfroy, similarly to the end of his "SAD!" music video, which features the phrase "LONG LIVE PRINCE X". The official music video has over 1.3 billion views on YouTube as of April 2026.

== Credits and personnel ==
- XXXTentacion – vocals, songwriting, composition
- John Cunningham – songwriting, composition, production, mixing
- Robert Soukiasyan – mixing, recording, studio personnel
- Dave Kutch – mastering, studio personnel
- Kevin Peterson – mastering assistant

== Charts ==
=== Weekly charts ===
Chart (2018)	Peak position
Austria (Ö3 Austria Top 40)	22
Belgium (Ultratip Bubbling Under Flanders)	7
Belgium (Ultratop 50 Wallonia)	39
Canada Hot 100 (Billboard)	10
Denmark (Tracklisten)	12
Estonia (IFPI)	13
France (SNEP)	11
Germany (GfK)	34
Hungary (Single Top 40)	31
Hungary (Stream Top 40)	14
Ireland (IRMA)	27
Italy (FIMI)	32
Netherlands (Single Top 100)	15
New Zealand (Recorded Music NZ)	8
Norway (VG-lista)	17
Portugal (AFP)	9
Scottish Singles Sales (Official Charts)	81
Spain (Promusicae)	73
Sweden (Sverigetopplistan)	13
Switzerland (Schweizer Hitparade)	11
UK Singles (Official Charts)	17
US Billboard Hot 100	13
US Hot R&B/Hip-Hop Songs (Billboard)	9
US Rhythmic Airplay (Billboard)	20

=== Year-end charts ===
Chart (2018)	Position
Canada (Canadian Hot 100)	71
Denmark (Tracklisten)	66
Estonia (IFPI)	25
France (SNEP)	32
New Zealand (Recorded Music NZ)	49
Portugal (AFP)	27
Sweden (Sverigetopplistan)	88
Switzerland (Schweizer Hitparade)	58
US Billboard Hot 100	88
US Hot R&B/Hip-Hop Songs (Billboard)	37
Chart (2019)	Position
France (SNEP)	118
Portugal (AFP)	124

== Certifications ==
Region	Certification	Certified units/sales
Brazil (Pro-Música Brasil)	2× Diamond	320,000^{‡}
Canada (Music Canada)	Platinum	80,000^{‡}
Denmark (IFPI Danmark)	Platinum	90,000^{‡}
France (SNEP)	Diamond	333,333^{‡}
Germany (BVMI)	Platinum	400,000^{‡}
Italy (FIMI)	Platinum	50,000^{‡}
New Zealand (RMNZ)	4× Platinum	120,000^{‡}
Poland (ZPAV)	2× Platinum	40,000^{‡}
Portugal (AFP)	2× Platinum	20,000^{‡}
Spain (Promusicae)	Platinum	60,000^{‡}
United Kingdom (BPI)	2× Platinum	1,200,000^{‡}
United States (RIAA)	9× Platinum	9,000,000^{‡}
Streaming
Greece (IFPI Greece)	Platinum	2,000,000^{†}
Sweden (GLF)	Platinum	8,000,000^{†}
^{‡} Sales+streaming figures based on certification alone.^{†} Streaming-only figures based on certification alone.
