= Now I Lay Me Down to Sleep =

Children's bedtime prayer

Now I lay me down to sleep is a Christian children's bedtime prayer from the 18th century.

== Text ==
Perhaps the earliest version was written by George Wheler in his 1698 book The Protestant Monastery, which reads:

Upon lying down, and going to sleep.

Here I lay me down to sleep.
To thee, O Lord, I give my Soul to keep,
Wake I ever, Or, Wake I never;
To thee O Lord, I give my Soul to keep for ever.

A later version printed in The New England Primer goes:

Now I lay me down to sleep,
I pray the Lord my Soul to keep[;]
If I should die before I 'wake,
I pray the Lord my Soul to take.

== Other versions ==
Grace Bridges, 1932:

Now I lay me down to sleep,
I pray my lord my soul to keep,
In the morn when I awake
Please teach me the path of life to take.

Now I lay me down to sleep,
I pray the Lord my soul to keep;
His Love to guard me through the night,
And wake me in the morning's light amen.

Now I lay me down to sleep,
I pray the Lord my soul to keep;
Please angels watch me through the night,
And keep me safe till morning light.

Now I lay me down to sleep,
I pray the Lord my soul to keep;
Angels watch me through the night,
And wake me with the morning light.
Amen

Now I wake to see the light,
As God has kept me through the night;
And now I lift my voice to pray,
That Thou wilt keep me through the day.

Now I lay me down to sleep,
I pray the Lord my soul to keep,
See me safely through the night,
And wake me with the morning light. Amen.

It is sometimes combined with the "Black Paternoster", one version of which goes:

Matthew, Mark, Luke and John,
Bless the bed that I lie on.
Four corners to my bed,
Four angels round my head;
One to watch and one to pray
And two to bear my soul away.

Sometimes the prayer ends with, “and this I ask for Jesus’ sake. Amen.”

== In popular culture ==
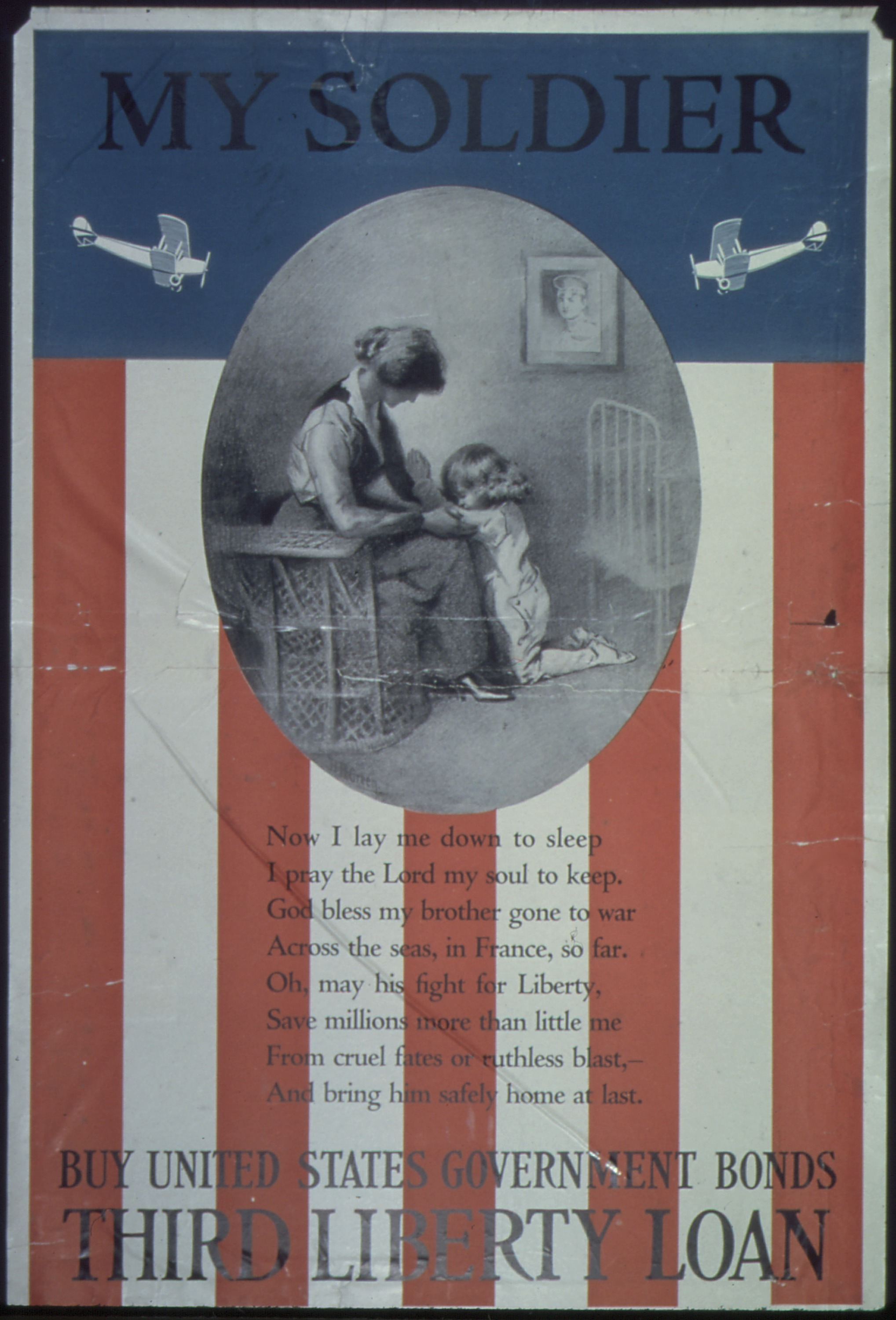
World War I propaganda poster of the United States

- In Wes Craven's A Nightmare on Elm Street, the film's protagonist, Nancy Thompson, recites the prayer before entering the dream world to confront Freddy Krueger.
- In The Simpsons episode "Lisa's First Word", Bart imagines the headboard on his clown bed reciting a line of the prayer, specifically "If you should die before you wake."
- American heavy metal band Metallica uses the whole prayer in their hit song "Enter Sandman" from their 1991 album Metallica.
- Rapper Snoop Dogg uses The New England Primer version in the bridge after the second verse of his song "Murder Was The Case" from his 1993 album Doggystyle.
- American heavy metal band Megadeth uses the whole prayer in their song "Go to hell" from their 1995 compilation Hidden Treasures.
- The Finnish gothic rock group HIM incorporates a modified version of the prayer in their song from 2003, "Buried Alive by Love".
- Rapper Kendrick Lamar includes two modified lines of the prayer to his song "Alien Girl (Today W/ Her)" from his 2010 mixtape, "O(verly) D(edicated)".
- Rapper JPEGMafia uses lines from this prayer in the chorus of his song "the 27 club" from his 2016 album Black Ben Carson.
- Art Garfunkel performed the song live during his 2016–2020 In Close-Up tour as the encore song.
- XXXTentacion incorporates a modified version of the first two lines of this prayer in the closer of his ? album, "Before I Close My Eyes".
- Singer Halsey uses The New England Primer version of the prayer in the intro portion of their 2019 single "Nightmare".
- Rapper JID takes from the first two lines and incorporates them into the first verse of "Kody Blu 31" from his 2022 album The Forever Story.
- Belgian hardcore DJ DRS uses this prayer in the introduction of his Thunderdome set in 2022.
- Singer Kid Cudi uses part of The New England Primer version in his A Kid Named Cudi album song "The Prayer".
- Canadian singer the Weeknd references this prayer in his song "Big Sleep" from his 2025 album Hurry Up Tomorrow, where featured artist Giorgio Moroder recites the lines "Now I lay me down to sleep, pray the Lord my soul to keep, angels watch me through the night, wake me up with light" in the second verse.

== See also ==
- Christian child's prayer – Easily memorable prayers recited by children
- Adon Olam - a Jewish prayer bearing some similarities
