= School Shooters (song) =

2019 song by XXXTentacion featuring Lil Wayne

Song by XXXTentacion featuring Lil Wayne

from the album Bad Vibes Forever
- Released: December 6, 2019
- Recorded: 2018-2019
- Genre: Hip hop
- Length: 1:33
- Label: Bad Vibes Forever; Empire
- Songwriters: Jahseh Onfroy; Dwayne Michael Carter, Jr.; John Cunningham; Jasper Sheff
- Producers: John Cunningham; Jasper Sheff

"School Shooters" is a song by American rapper XXXTentacion featuring fellow American rapper Lil Wayne. Released on the album, Bad Vibes Forever on December 6, 2019, through Empire Distribution. The song was produced by John Cunningham and Jasper Sheff.

It is dedicated to the victims of the Parkland high school shooting.

== Background and composition ==
According to XXXTentacion's manager Solomon Sobande, "School Shooters" was one of several songs XXXTentacion had intended to release later in his career.

John Cunningham told Billboard that XXXTentacion was deeply affected by the 2018 Parkland high school shooting, which happened near his home. Cunningham said that they recorded several songs in response to the shooting, including "School Shooters". After hearing the song's aggressive instrumental, XXXTentacion decided that a message centered on compassion would be better conveyed through the song, "Hope", which he dedicated to those affected by the shooting.

The recording was incomplete at the time of his death, consisting of material that required additional work. Lil Wayne was later brought in to finish the song. "School Shooters" opens with an "anxious" synth-based instrumental before XXXTentacion delivers a short verse, followed by Lil Wayne's verse.

== Personnel ==
Credits adapted from Apple Music.

- Jahseh Onfroy – performer, songwriter
- Dwayne Michael Carter, Jr. – performer, songwriter
- John Cunningham – songwriter, producer
- Jasper Sheff – songwriter, producer
- Koen Heldens – mixing engineer
- Dave Kutch – mastering engineer
- Kevin Peterson – assistant mastering engineer

== Music video ==
A music video directed by Eif Rivera was released on April 10, 2020. The video follows a bullied teenager who is harassed in a school bathroom and subsequently considers carrying out an attack at his school. It also references XXXTentacion's visit to Parkland high school shooting survivor Anthony Borges in the hospital. The video concludes with a call to action directing viewers to the U.S. government's website dedicated to stop bullying.
