= Numb (XXXTentacion song) =

2018 song by XXXTentacion

Song by XXXTentacion

from the album ?
- Released: March 16, 2018
- Genre: Punk rock; alternative rock; grunge; emo
- Length: 3:06
- Label: Bad Vibes Forever; Caroline; Capitol
- Songwriter: Jahseh Onfroy
- Producer: Cunningham

"Numb" (stylized in all caps) is a song by American rapper and singer XXXTentacion from his second studio album, ? (2018). The song was written by XXXTentacion and produced by John Cunningham.

Numb was ranked eleventh on XXL’s “The 30 Best XXXTentacion Songs” list.

== Composition ==
XXL described the song as a guitar‑fueled, emotional ballad in which XXXTentacion lets loose his feelings about depression. While his songs about this emotion often evoke numbness, in this track he is portrayed as being swallowed by his emotions rather than indifferent. They also noted that the artist wallows in his tears over a charging electric guitar melody, emphasizing the raw and intense emotional expression throughout the track.

== Critical reception ==
"Numb" received mixed reviews from music critics. HotNewHipHop described the instrumentation as feeling like a misstep, arguing that the arrangement and melody were “neither particularly memorable”. Sputnikmusic expressed ambivalence about the song in the context of the album, characterizing it as an example of stylistic inconsistency, a rock‑influenced track that diverged from X’s established aesthetic without strongly contributing to the album’s cohesion. XXL described the song as an emotional ballad over a charging electric guitar melody, emphasizing a raw and intense emotional expression.

== Personnel ==
Credits adapted from Apple Music.

- Jahseh Onfroy - vocals, songwriter, composer
- John Cunningham - guitar, programming, piano, bass guitar, composer, producer, mixing engineer
- Robert Soukiasyan - drums, composer, mixing engineer, recording engineer, co-producer
- Dave Kutch - mastering engineer
- Kevin Peterson - assistant mastering engineer
- Oren Yoel - composer

== Charts ==
Chart (2018)	Peak position
Canada Hot 100 (Billboard)	58
Ireland (IRMA)	72
Sweden (Sverigetopplistan)	89
UK Singles (Official Charts)	98
UK Indie (Official Charts)	13
US Billboard Hot 100	80

== Certifications ==
Region	Certification	Certified units/sales
France (SNEP)	Gold	100,000^{‡}
New Zealand (RMNZ)	Platinum	30,000^{‡}
United Kingdom (BPI)	Gold	400,000^{‡}
United States (RIAA)	3× Platinum	3,000,000^{‡}
^{‡} Sales+streaming figures based on certification alone.

== Acoustic version ==
"Numb (Acoustic)"

Song by XXXTentacion

from the album ?
- Released: September 6, 2019
- Genre: Ballad
- Length: 2:32
- Label: Bad Vibes Forever; Caroline; Capitol
- Songwriter: Jahseh Onfroy
- Producer: Cunningham

"Numb (Acoustic)" is a demo featured on the posthumous deluxe anniversary edition of his second studio album, ?, released on September 6, 2019.
