= Valee =

American rapper from Chicago (born 1988)

- Born: Valee Taylor; August 27, 1988 (age 38); Chicago, Illinois, U.S.
- Genres: Midwestern hip-hop; trap
- Occupations: Rapper; singer; songwriter
- Instrument: Vocals
- Years active: 2015–present
- Labels: GOOD; Def Jam

Valee Taylor (born August 27, 1988) is an American rapper from Chicago, Illinois. His third mixtape, 1988 (2017) was discovered by Pusha T, who led him to sign with fellow Chicago rapper Kanye West's record label GOOD Music, an imprint of Def Jam Recordings in February 2018. His debut extended play (EP), GOOD Job, You Found Me was released the following month and executive produced by West. In May of that year, his single "Womp Womp" (featuring Jeremih) narrowly entered both the Bubbling Under Hot 100 and Canadian Hot 100. In the following year, he parted ways with the label.

== Early life ==
Valee Taylor grew up on Chicago's South Side, living in the Robert Taylor Homes and moving repeatedly once they were demolished. Valee has said his mother exposed him to musicians such as Erykah Badu, Sade, Jill Scott at an early age. Valee pays homage to the artists frequently in his music. He was trained as an auto mechanic, and earned income by working on automobiles from his mother's garage prior to recording.

Throughout his schooling, he had repeated issues with anger, and his outbursts led to his expulsion from numerous schools. The rapper cites Cash Money and Project Pat as early hip hop influences.

Taylor says he decided to make music on a whim while living in the South Side of Chicago. He says he was on his way to purchase a video game system, but on the way decided to go to Guitar Center instead. He purchased the necessary equipment to start making beats and shortly after he began rapping over them.

== Music ==
Valee's early work includes collaborations with producers such as Rio Mac and Chase the Money. His first song, "Cash Don't Bend" (with Ty Money) was released in 2015. From then until 2017, Valee released five independent projects: 12:12 (2015), 1:11 (2016), 2:22 (2016), 12:12 Again (2016) and 1988 (2017).

After he was signed to Kanye West's GOOD Music by the label's then-president Pusha T in February 2018, he released his debut extended play and first retail project, GOOD Job, You Found Me. It was executive produced by West and saw minimal commercial response, although Pitchfork reviewed the project and gave it a score of 7.4/10.

In May 2018, Valee released the single "Womp Womp", featuring Jeremih. The song was later featured on the soundtrack of the 2019 Netflix film Beats leading its debut at number 98 on the Billboard Canadian Hot 100 and at 24 on the Bubbling Under Hot 100.

In 2019, he released a surprise EP, Runnin Rich, which included features from G Herbo, King Louie, and Vic Mensa. The cover art is a picture of the rapper's pet Chihuahua dog named Cliff Notez, whom he was publicly condemned for dying red. Valee responded to the critics explaining he used "edible vegan dye" in order to color the pet's fur. He also released tracks with Big Baby DRAM ("About U"), Matt Ox ("Awesome"), and Lil Yachty ("Wombo") and appeared on YG's album 4Real 4Real.

Valee is currently managed by Andrew Barber, founder of notable Chicago Hip-Hop Blog: Fake Shore Drive.

== Discography ==
=== Albums ===
- 12:12 (2015)
- 12:12 Again (2016)
- 1988 (2017)
- Runnin' Rich (2019)
- VACABULAREE (2022)

=== Collaboration Albums ===
- The TrAppiEst Elevator Music Ever! (with AYOCHILLMANNN) (2021)
- The TrAppiEst Disco Music Ever! (with AYOCHILLMANNN) (2021)
- Gimme Five Im High (with CHASETHEMONEY) (2021)
- Virtuoso (with Harry Fraud) (2023)
- VALEEDATION (with MVW) (2023)
- CAR TOONS (with Top$ide & Trap-A-Holics) (2023)

=== EPs ===
- 1:11 (2016)
- 2:22 (2016)
- GOOD Job, You Found Me (2018)
- VLANE (with Stan Lane) (2021)
- VLANE (Instrumentals) (with Stan Lane) (2021)
- VLANE 2 (with Stan Lane) (2024)
- Partridge (with Black Noi$e) (2024)
- Grey Sky London (with Surf Gang) (2024)

=== Singles ===
- VTL (2016)
- Shell (2017)
- Acid (2017)
- I Got Whatever (2017)
- Miami (2017)
- Are U Live (with Chance the Rapper & Jeremih) (2017)
- Miami (Remix) (featuring Pusha T) (2018)
- Womp Womp (featuring Jeremih) (2018)
- Spondivits (with Dro Fe) (2018)
- Awesome (featuring Matt Ox) (2018)
- About U (featuring DRAM) (2018)
- You & Me Both (2019)
- Uninvited (featuring Calboy) (2019)
- Do My Thing (with Outlaw Mel, The Outfit & TX) (2020)
- Bling Bling (with CHASETHEMONEY) (2020)
- Still Do (with MVW) (2021)
- Us (with MVW) (2021)
- Aladdin (with Stan Lane) (2021)
- Fa Good (with Stan Lane) (2021)
- Picture Me (with the Kii & Kelvyn Colt) (2021)
- Hard 2 Notice? (with DarkoQuan & Eight O) (2021)
- Trident (with CHASETHEMONEY) (2022)
- AREA (with Bandland ZZ) (2022)
- BUN B (with Bandland ZZ) (2022)
- Will Pharrell (with DarkoQuan) (2022)
- Yhet (with AYOCHILLMANNN) (2022)
- Never That (with MVW & 645AR) (featuring Matt Ox) (2022)
- Gucci Wallabees (with DarkoQuan) (2022)
- Oscar (with MVW) (2022)
- Around + Wolfe's Deep Snippet (with KingTrey & Yvng.Wolfe) (featuring Michael Christmas) (2022)
- Long Week (2022)
- HERMES$ (featuring TyMadeit) (2022)
- Hedi (with Tommy Revenge & SkipOnDaBeat) (2022)
- Man Man (with My Favorite Color) (2022)
- Risk (with Z Money) (2023)
- Sci-Fi (with Meech La'flare) (featuring MOSCO) (2023)
- Yo Yo (with MVW) (featuring Tony Shhnow) (2023)
- Could Be (with MVW) (2023)
- Pistachio (with MVW, AYOCHILLMANNN) & Zelooperz) (2023)
- Yellow (with DarkoQuan) (2023)
- Vibrant (with Harry Fraud, AYOCHILLMANNN & Action Bronson) (2023)
- Watermelon Automobile (with Saba & Mavi) (2023)
- Chanel (with Kanine the Don) (2023)
- Tailor Swift (with MVW) (2023)
- Créme De La Créme (with MVW & Pink Siifu) (2023)
- CoMmandO (with Stan Lane) (2024)
- Kn0ck Kn0ck (with Sicario & YUNG KRONIK) (2024)
- Hermès Pyrex (with Isha & Duke Mobb) (2025)

== Personal life ==
Valee has four children and three dogs (Furrari, Ravioli and Sophia).
