= Infinity (888) =

2018 song by XXXTentacion featuring Joey Badass

Song by XXXTentacion featuring Joey Badass

from the album ?
- Released: March 16, 2018
- Genre: Boom bap; jazz rap; hip-hop
- Length: 2:56
- Label: Bad Vibes Forever; Caroline
- Songwriters: Jahseh Onfroy; Jo-Vaughn Virginie Scott; Brandon Mychael Jameel Beazer; James George Hunter
- Producer: P. Soul

"Infinity (888)" is a song by the American rapper and singer XXXTentacion, featuring Joey Badass. Released on the album, ? on March 16, 2018 through Bad Vibes Forever, Caroline Distribution, and Capitol Music Group, the song was written by XXXTentacion, Joey Badass, Jimmy Rowles and P. Soul.

The track was produced by P. Soul and samples the 1977 jazz song "The Peacocks" by Jimmy Rowles and Stan Getz. This song was ranked sixth on XXL’s “The 30 Best XXXTentacion Songs” list and eighth on Billboard’s “10 Best XXXTentacion Songs.”

== Background ==
According to XXL, the track was X's "best attempt at peak East Coast hip-hop." Badass brings a jazzy style, and X introduces boom bap percussion.

Billboard noted that although XXXTentacion and Joey Badass might seem like an unlikely pairing, the two artists brought out strong performances in each other. XXXTentacion emphasized his rap focused side over P. Soul's driving drums, and the collaboration was intended to be part of a larger joint project that was never completed before XXXTentacion's death.

== Personnel ==
Credits adapted from Apple Music.

- Jahseh Onfroy - artist, songwriter
- Jo-Vaughn Virginie Scott - featured artist, songwriter
- Brandon Mychael Jameel Beazer - songwriter, producer
- James George Hunter - songwriter
- Robert Soukiasyan - mixing engineer, recording engineer
- Dave Kutch - mastering engineer
- Kevin Peterson - assistant mastering engineer

== Charts ==
Chart (2018)	Peak position
Canada Hot 100 (Billboard)	54
US Billboard Hot 100	83
US Hot R&B/Hip-Hop Songs (Billboard)	36

== Certifications ==
Region	Certification	Certified units/sales
New Zealand (RMNZ)	Platinum	30,000^{‡}
United Kingdom (BPI)	Silver	200,000^{‡}
United States (RIAA)	2× Platinum	2,000,000^{‡}
^{‡} Sales+streaming figures based on certification alone.
