= Changes (XXXTentacion song) =

Single by XXXTentacion

from the album ?
- Released: March 2, 2018
- Genre: R&B; piano ballad
- Length: 2:02
- Label: Bad Vibes Forever; Caroline
- Songwriters: Jahseh Onfroy; John Cunningham; Rakim Allen
- Producer: Cunningham

XXXTentacion singles chronology
"Sad!" (2018)	"Changes" (2018)	"Moonlight" (2018)

"Changes" (stylized in lowercase) is a song by American rapper and singer XXXTentacion, released on March 2, 2018, as the second single from his second studio album ?. The song has an uncredited feature from fellow American rapper PnB Rock. Written by the performers alongside producer John Cunningham, it is XXXTentacion's last single to be released during his lifetime.

== Release and reception ==
On March 1, 2018, X announced he was releasing two songs from his then-upcoming album ?, saying on Instagram "Dropping two songs from my album tonight at 12:00 am est, play them more times than you can count." "Changes" was released on March 2, 2018, on Spotify, Deezer, iTunes/Apple Music and Tidal alongside "Sad!".

HotNewHipHop called it a "slow jam" and noted that X is "channeling his emotion to go for more of a singing vibe." Billboard called it a "heart-on-sleeve track" with revealing lyrics. XXL called the song a "piano-driven ballad" that takes a different tone than X's "Sad!".

== Credits and personnel ==
Credits adapted from Tidal.

- Jahseh Onfroy – vocals, songwriting, composition
- Rakim Allen – vocals, songwriting, composition
- Robert Soukiasyan – mixing
- Kevin Peterson – mastering
- Dave Kutch – mastering

== Charts ==
=== Weekly charts ===
Chart (2018)	Peak position
Australia (ARIA)	15
Austria (Ö3 Austria Top 40)	10
Canada Hot 100 (Billboard)	15
Czech Republic Singles Digital (ČNS IFPI)	13
Denmark (Tracklisten)	8
Estonia (IFPI)	25
France (SNEP)	22
Germany (GfK)	13
Hungary (Single Top 40)	30
Hungary (Stream Top 40)	15
Ireland (IRMA)	28
Italy (FIMI)	33
Netherlands (Single Top 100)	20
New Zealand (Recorded Music NZ)	11
Norway (VG-lista)	9
Portugal (AFP)	5
Scotland Singles (OCC)	51
Slovakia Singles Digital (ČNS IFPI)	58
Spain (PROMUSICAE)	55
Sweden (Sverigetopplistan)	6
Switzerland (Schweizer Hitparade)	9
UK Singles (OCC)	22
UK Indie (OCC)	7
US Billboard Hot 100	18
US Hot R&B/Hip-Hop Songs (Billboard)	12

=== Year-end charts ===
Chart (2018)	Position
Canada (Canadian Hot 100)	88
Denmark (Tracklisten)	64
Estonia (IFPI)	74
France (SNEP)	167
Portugal (AFP)	52
Sweden (Sverigetopplistan)	72
US Billboard Hot 100	94
US Hot R&B/Hip-Hop Songs (Billboard)	50

== Certifications ==
Region	Certification	Certified units/sales
Australia (ARIA)	3× Platinum	210,000^{‡}
Canada (Music Canada)	Platinum	80,000^{‡}
Denmark (IFPI Danmark)	Platinum	90,000^{‡}
France (SNEP)	Diamond	333,333^{‡}
Germany (BVMI)	Gold	200,000^{‡}
Italy (FIMI)	Platinum	50,000^{‡}
New Zealand (RMNZ)	3× Platinum	90,000^{‡}
Poland (ZPAV)	2× Platinum	100,000^{‡}
Portugal (AFP)	2× Platinum	20,000^{‡}
Spain (Promusicae)	Platinum	60,000^{‡}
United Kingdom (BPI)	Platinum	600,000^{‡}
United States (RIAA)	5× Platinum	5,000,000^{‡}
Streaming
Sweden (GLF)	Platinum	8,000,000^{†}
^{‡} Sales+streaming figures based on certification alone.^{†} Streaming-only figures based on certification alone.
