= Skins (XXXTentacion album) =

Studio album by XXXTentacion
- Released: December 7, 2018
- Recorded: 2018
- Studio: XXX Studios
- Genre: Lofi hip hop
- Length: 19:44
- Labels: Bad Vibes Forever; Empire
- Producers: Cubeatz; John Cunningham; Potsu; Robert Soukiasyan; XXXTentacion

XXXTentacion chronology
? (2018)	Skins (2018)	Members Only, Vol. 4 (2019)

Singles from Skins
- 1. "Bad!" Released: November 9, 2018

Skins (stylized in all caps) is the third studio album by American rapper XXXTentacion. It was posthumously released on December 7, 2018, through Bad Vibes Forever and Empire Distribution. It is one of the projects that XXXTentacion worked on before his death, and was released posthumously. The album features guest appearances from Travis Barker of Blink-182 and Kanye West. The album's theme sees XXXTentacion discuss heartbreak and mental turmoil. Genres on the album draw influence from lo-fi, nu metal, screamo, emo, punk rock, ambient, trap and acoustic. Skins was leaked to the internet three days before its official release date.

The album's lead and only single, "BAD!", reached number 16 on the Billboard Hot 100. Although the album received mixed reviews from critics, with criticism aimed at the album's short length and "unfinished" nature, it was a commercial success, debuting at number one on the US Billboard 200, making it XXXTentacion's second US number-one album. It sold 132,000 album-equivalent units in its first week in the US, of which 52,000 were pure album sales, and has since been certified gold by the Recording Industry Association of America (RIAA) for sales of 500,000 units in the US.

== Background ==
After the release of the EP A Ghetto Christmas Carol in December 2017, XXXTentacion announced he was preparing three new albums and eventually announced the titles of the albums as Bad Vibes Forever, SKINS, and ?. XXXTentacion's second studio album ? was released in March 2018. XXXTentacion was murdered in June 2018 before the albums Bad Vibes Forever and Skins could be released.

It was posted temporarily on XXXTentacion's Instagram after his death that the album would be "super short. It's literally gonna be a minute", but several publications reported that the album may appear in unfinished form. Some of the details about the album were shown when an iTunes Store link became active for a period of time on November 7 before being taken down; the page showed that the album had 10 tracks and was a total of 17 minutes long. The page was later reinstated. The only track title shown is that of "BAD!" DJ Scheme, XXXTentacion’s official DJ, stated that Skins will not be XXXTentacion's final posthumous album release.

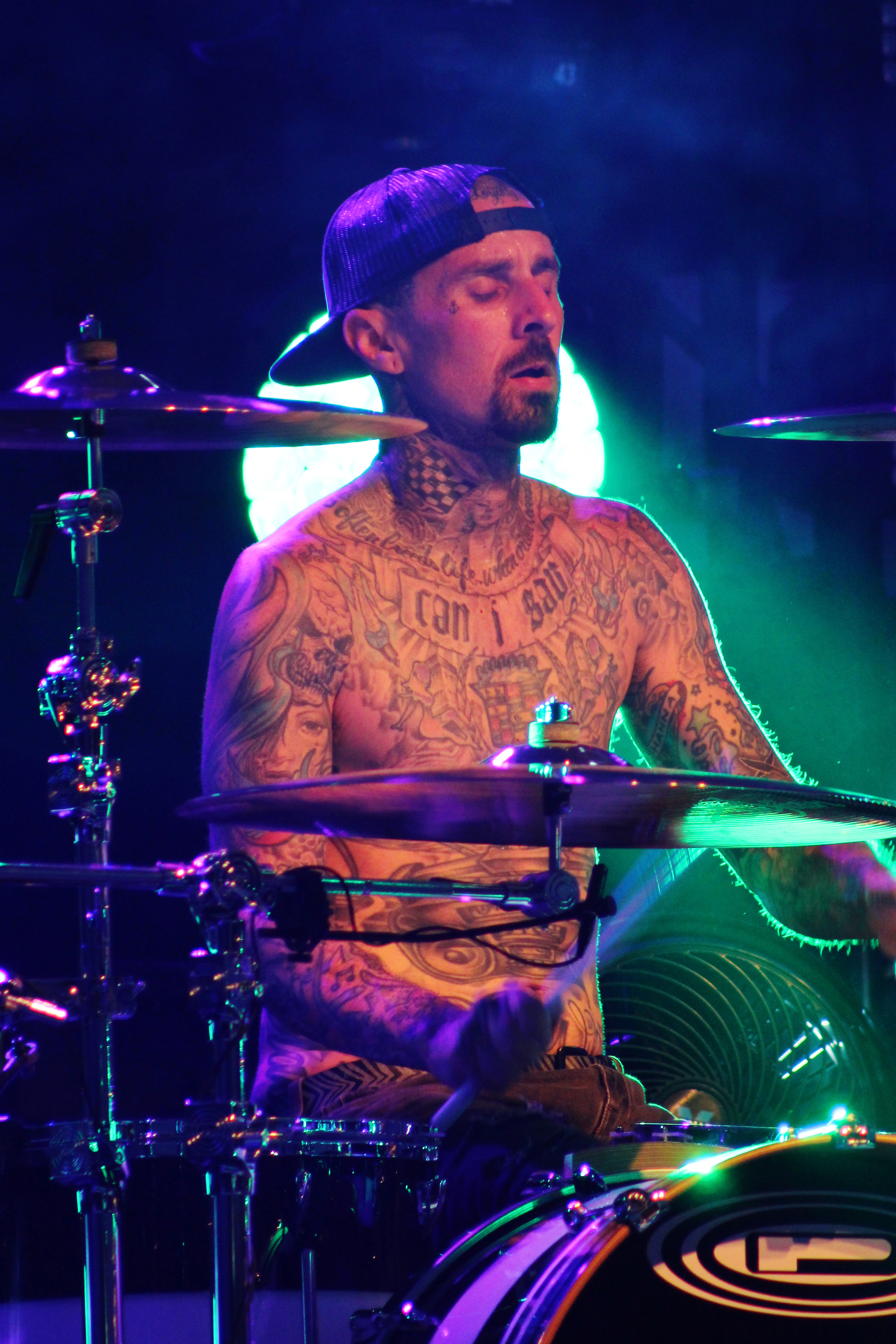
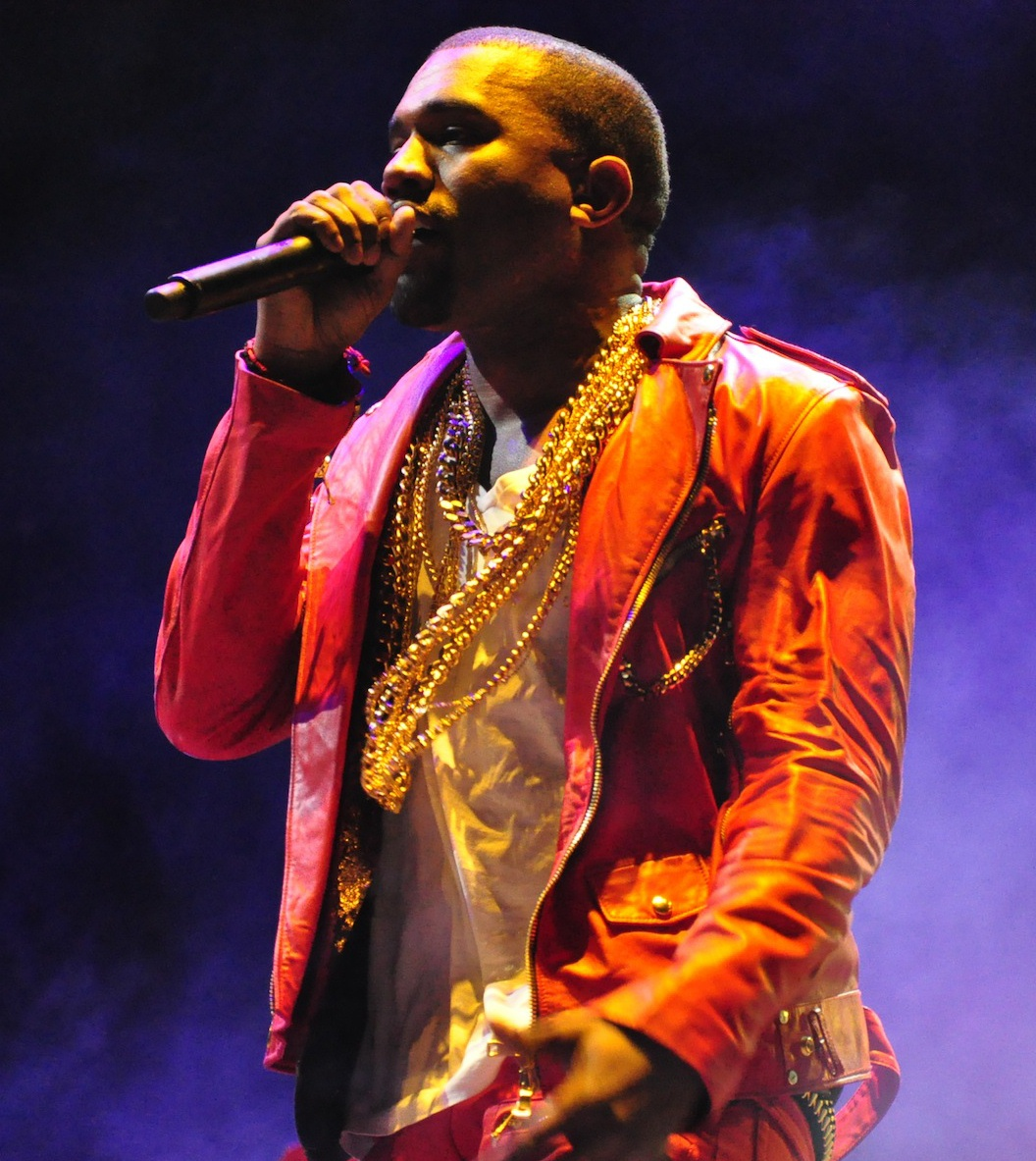
Travis Barker and Kanye West were the two features on the album.

In September 2018, American rapper and record producer Kanye West privately previewed a song from his upcoming album Yandhi that featured posthumous vocals by XXXTentacion. On November 23, 2018, a snippet of an XXXTentacion song titled "One Minute" that featured West leaked. "One Minute" was later confirmed when the official track listing was revealed on December 3, 2018.

== Composition and lyrics ==
Scott Glaysher of XXL wrote, "SKINS" picks up right where ? left off: It's a chaotic medley of rock and rap that leaves more questions than answers." The album's theme sees XXXTentacion discuss heartbreak and mental turmoil. Genres on the album draw influence from lo-fi, emo, screamo, punk rock, nu metal, ambient, trap and acoustic. Like XXXTentacion's previous albums, ? features piano chords and acoustic guitar, but also features use of electric guitar riffs.

Regarding the album's genre, Glaysher wrote, "Props are due to XXXTentacion for trying to tackle all these genres, yet despite the late artist's versatility, his third album feels a bit skeletal. The songs are short, not mixed particularly well and—perhaps due to his untimely passing—feel unfinished. Had X been around to see this album all the way through and hash out some of its rushed wrinkles, it has the potential to have been his best project yet. But as it sits right now, Skins renders itself another opportunity for XXXTentacion's cult-like following to continue enjoying new music".

== Promotion ==
The original planned album artwork for Skins. This image was uploaded to Onfroy's Instagram profile a month before his murder.

While XXXTentacion had sung a line of "BAD!" and talked about SKINS on Instagram prior to his death, the state of the album was unconfirmed after his death until his team posted on Twitter that further details would be announced on November 9. The pre-order became available shortly after "Bad!" was released.

== Critical reception ==
Professional ratings
Aggregate scores
Source	Rating
AnyDecentMusic?	4.6/10
Metacritic	44/100
Review scores
Source	Rating
AllMusic	2/5 stars
The Independent	3/5 stars
NME	3/5 stars
Pitchfork	3.0/10
RapReviews	6.5/10
Slant Magazine	1.5/5 stars
XXL	L (3/5)

At Metacritic, which assigns a rating out of 100 to reviews from mainstream critics, the album received an average score of 44, based on 9 reviews, indicating "mixed or average reviews".

The Independent described the album as "another fiery blast of catharsis, a largely metaphor-free space where depression isn't hinted at poetically but invited to throw down". Writing for XXL, Glaysher stated "it's a chaotic medley of rock and rap that leaves more questions than answers." Slant Magazine stated "even the songs where Onfroy can be heard for more than a few seconds feel more like demos than finished tracks—an effect that can be haunting, as on the spare, acoustic guitar-driven "Difference (Interlude)" and "What Are You So Afraid Of"."

== Commercial performance ==
Skins debuted at number one on the US Billboard 200 with 132,000 album-equivalent units, of which 52,000 were pure album sales. It is XXXTentacion's second US number-one album. The album charted on the US Billboard 200 for 18 weeks before leaving the chart. The album has been certified gold by the Recording Industry Association of America (RIAA) for sales of 500,000 units in the US.

== Track listing ==
Credits adapted from Tidal.

No.	Title	Writer(s)	Producer(s)	Length
1.	"Introduction"	Jahseh Onfroy	XXXTentacion	0:31
2.	"Guardian Angel"	Onfroy; Ciara Simms	Potsu; XXXTentacion	1:48
3.	"Train Food"	Onfroy; John Cunningham	Cunningham; XXXTentacion	2:44
4.	"Whoa (Mind in Awe)"	Onfroy; Cunningham; Robert Soukiasyan	Cunningham	2:37
5.	"Bad!"	Onfroy; Cunningham; Soukiasyan	Cunningham; Soukiasyan	1:34
6.	"Staring at the Sky"	Onfroy; Cunningham	Cunningham; XXXTentacion	1:25
7.	"One Minute" (featuring Kanye West and Travis Barker)	Onfroy; Cunningham; Travis Barker; Kanye West	Cunningham	3:17
8.	"Difference (Interlude)"	Onfroy; Cunningham	Cunningham	1:16
9.	"I Don't Let Go"	Onfroy; Cunningham; Kevin Gomringer; Tim Gomringer	Cunningham; Cubeatz	2:01
10.	"What Are You So Afraid Of"	Onfroy; Cunningham; Soukiasyan	Cunningham; Soukiasyan	2:31
Total length:				19:44

Notes

- "Guardian Angel", "Train Food" and "I Don't Let Go" are stylized in sentence case. (e.g. "Train Food" = "Train food")
- "Whoa (Mind in Awe)", "Difference (Interlude)" and "What Are You So Afraid Of" are stylized in lowercase.
- "Bad!" and "Staring at the Sky" are stylized in uppercase.

== Personnel ==
- XXXTentacion – vocals, composition, engineering, executive production, production
- Kanye West – composition, vocals
- Travis Barker – composition, drums
- John Cunningham – bass, composition, drums, engineering, executive production, guitar, mixing, piano, production, programming
- Cubeatz – composition
- Koen Heldens – mixing
- Brandon Brown – mixing assistance
- Dave Kutch – mastering
- Kevin Peterson – mastering assistance
- C. Nicole Simms – composition
- Robbie Soukiasyan – additional production, composition, engineering, guitar, keyboards, mixing, piano, production

== Charts ==
=== Weekly charts ===
Chart (2018)	Peak position
Australian Albums (ARIA)	8
Austrian Albums (Ö3 Austria)	10
Belgian Albums (Ultratop Flanders)	15
Belgian Albums (Ultratop Wallonia)	50
Canadian Albums (Billboard)	4
Danish Albums (Hitlisten)	5
Estonian Albums (IFPI)	1
Dutch Albums (Album Top 100)	3
Finnish Albums (Suomen virallinen lista)	2
French Albums (SNEP)	53
Irish Albums (IRMA)	9
Italian Albums (FIMI)	25
Latvian Albums (LAIPA)	1
Lithuanian Albums (AGATA)	1
New Zealand Albums (RMNZ)	5
Norwegian Albums (VG-lista)	1
Swedish Albums (Sverigetopplistan)	1
Swiss Albums (Schweizer Hitparade)	36
UK Albums (Official Charts)	29
US Billboard 200	1
US Top R&B/Hip-Hop Albums (Billboard)	1

=== Year-end charts ===
Chart (2019)	Position
US Billboard 200	133
US Top R&B/Hip-Hop Albums (Billboard)	61

== Certifications ==
Region	Certification	Certified units/sales
Denmark (IFPI Danmark)	Gold	10,000^{‡}
United Kingdom (BPI)	Silver	60,000^{‡}
United States (RIAA)	Gold	500,000^{‡}
^{‡} Sales+streaming figures based on certification alone.
