= A Ghetto Christmas Carol (song) =

2017 song by XXXTentacion

Song by XXXTentacion

from the album A Ghetto Christmas Carol and ? (Deluxe Anniversary Edition)
- Released: December 11, 2017
- Genre: emo rap; hip-hop
- Length: 1:44
- Label: Bad Vibes Forever; Caroline; Capitol
- Songwriters: Jahseh Onfroy; Ronald Spence Jr.; Kevin Gomringer; Tim Gomringer
- Producers: Ronny J; Cubeatz

"A Ghetto Christmas Carol" is a song by American rapper XXXTentacion included on his tenth and final extended play A Ghetto Christmas Carol, and later re-released on the posthumous anniversary deluxe edition of his second studio album, ? through Bad Vibes Forever, Caroline Distribution, and Capitol Music Group. It was written by XXXTentacion and produced by Ronny J and Cubeatz.

This song was ranked 13th on XXL's list of "The 30 Best XXXTentacion Songs, Ranked".

== Background ==
"A Ghetto Christmas Carol" was recorded in November 2017 during sessions for XXXTentacion's extended play of the same name, which was completed over the course of a single weekend. According to mixing engineer Koen Heldens, he initially attempted to clean up the song's distorted 808 bass, but XXXTentacion and producer Ronny J insisted that the sound remain untouched, believing it should evoke the feel of an electric guitar through low-end frequencies. Heldens later cited the experience as an example of XXXTentacion's emphasis on emotion and atmosphere over technical perfection during the recording process.

XXL described the track as a "hedonistic" interpretation of a Christmas song, characterized by an unconventional, dark atmosphere that resembles "more like Halloween seance than the stuff of carolers." The publication also noted XXXTentacion's vocal delivery over the production, highlighting themes of materialism, luxury, and excess rather than traditional festive imagery.

== Charts ==
Chart performance for "A Ghetto Christmas Carol"
Chart (2026)	Peak position
US Bubbling Under Hot 100 (Billboard)	13

== Certifications ==
Certifications for "A Ghetto Christmas Carol"
Region	Certification	Certified units/sales
New Zealand (RMNZ)	Gold	15,000^{‡}
United States (RIAA)	Platinum	1,000,000^{‡}
^{‡} Sales+streaming figures based on certification alone.
