= The Remedy for a Broken Heart (Why Am I So in Love) =

2018 song by XXXTentacion

Song by XXXTentacion

from the album ?
- Released: March 16, 2018
- Genre: Emo rap; R&B
- Length: 2:40
- Label: Bad Vibes Forever; Caroline
- Songwriter: Jahseh Onfroy
- Producers: XXXTentacion; John Cunningham

"The Remedy for a Broken Heart (Why Am I So in Love)" (stylized in all lowercase) is a song by American rapper XXXTentacion from his second studio album ? (2018). It was written by XXXTentacion and produced by him along with John Cunningham.

== Composition ==
The song contains an acoustic sound blending with trap elements, "morose 808s", and a looped sample of XXXTentacion's vocals, of the lyrics "Why am I so in love? I don't know why". X reflects on his past relationship with his ex-girlfriend Geneva Ayala, revolving around how his love for her is unrequited, while the "remedy" for his broken heart is presumably his girlfriend Jenesis Sanchez, with X singing, "I, oh, I, am fallin' for you, fallin' for you".

== Critical reception ==
The song received generally positive reviews. Kevin Goddard of HotNewHipHop wrote that "X shows off his impressive wordplay and effortless flow" in the song.

== Charts ==
Chart (2018)	Peak position
Austria (Ö3 Austria Top 40)	48
Canada Hot 100 (Billboard)	46
Denmark (Tracklisten)	30
Estonia (IFPI)	24
France (SNEP)	50
Germany (GfK)	73
Ireland (IRMA)	50
Italy (FIMI)	67
Netherlands (Single Top 100)	53
New Zealand Heatseekers (RMNZ)	1
Norway (VG-lista)	31
Sweden (Sverigetopplistan)	41
Switzerland (Schweizer Hitparade)	36
UK Singles (OCC)	53
US Billboard Hot 100	55
US Hot R&B/Hip-Hop Songs (Billboard)	26

== Certifications ==
Region	Certification	Certified units/sales
Brazil (Pro-Música Brasil)	Diamond	160,000^{‡}
Canada (Music Canada)	Gold	40,000^{‡}
Denmark (IFPI Danmark)	Platinum	90,000^{‡}
France (SNEP)	Platinum	200,000^{‡}
Germany (BVMI)	Gold	200,000^{‡}
Italy (FIMI)	Gold	25,000^{‡}
New Zealand (RMNZ)	2× Platinum	60,000^{‡}
Poland (ZPAV)	Platinum	50,000^{‡}
Portugal (AFP)	Platinum	10,000^{‡}
Spain (Promusicae)	Gold	30,000^{‡}
United Kingdom (BPI)	Platinum	600,000^{‡}
United States (RIAA)	5× Platinum	5,000,000^{‡}
^{‡} Sales+streaming figures based on certification alone.
