= Whoa (Mind in Awe) =

2018 song by XXXTentacion

Song by XXXTentacion

from the album Skins
- Released: December 7, 2018
- Genre: Pop
- Length: 2:38
- Label: Bad Vibes Forever; Empire
- Songwriters: Jahseh Onfroy; John Cunningham; Robert Soukiasyan
- Producer: Cunningham

"Whoa (Mind in Awe)" (stylized in all lowercase) is a song by the American rapper XXXTentacion from his third studio album, Skins (2018). A melodic track, the song features a xylophone instrumental and XXXTentacion singing about his motivation to move on from his troubled past. It was written by XXXTentacion, John Cunningham, and Robert Soukiasyan, and produced by Cunningham. A remix featuring Juice Wrld was released on May 30, 2025.

== Release and reception ==
"Whoa (Mind in Awe)" was released on December 7, 2018 alongside the album Skins. It received mixed reviews from critics, with some describing it as beautiful while others found it underwhelming.

== Charts ==
Chart (2018)	Peak position
Canada Hot 100 (Billboard)	32
France (SNEP)	94
Ireland (IRMA)	18
Italy (FIMI)	77
Netherlands (Single Top 100)	50
New Zealand (Recorded Music NZ)	27
Norway (VG-lista)	35
Sweden (Sverigetopplistan)	44
Switzerland (Schweizer Hitparade)	44
UK Singles (Official Charts)	37
US Billboard Hot 100	37
US Hot R&B/Hip-Hop Songs (Billboard)	15

== Certifications ==
Region	Certification	Certified units/sales
New Zealand (RMNZ)	Platinum	30,000^{‡}
United States (RIAA)	Platinum	1,000,000^{‡}
^{‡} Sales+streaming figures based on certification alone.

== Juice Wrld remix ==
"Whoa (Mind in Awe)" (remix)

Single by XXXTentacion and Juice Wrld
- Released: May 30, 2025
- Recorded: 2018–2019
- Genre: Pop rap
- Length: 3:17
- Label: Bad Vibes Forever; Empire
- Songwriters: Jahseh Onfroy; Jarad Higgins; John Cunningham; Robert Soukiasyan
- Producer: Cunningham

XXXTentacion singles chronology
"Teeth (Interlude)" (2024)	"Whoa (Mind in Awe)" (remix) (2025)	"The Way" (2025)

Juice Wrld singles chronology
"AGATS2 (Insecure)" (2024)	"Whoa (Mind in Awe) (remix)" (2025)	"The Way" (2025)

The remix of "Whoa (Mind in Awe)", a collaboration with American rapper Juice Wrld, was released on May 30, 2025. The remix's existence was originally revealed in 2020 by XXXTentacion's producer John Cunningham, who stated that Juice Wrld was supposed to be featured on the original song.

Juice Wrld ended up recording his verse for "Whoa (Mind in Awe)" on March 19, 2019, but it was never released during his lifetime. Additionally, both X and Juice Wrld had expressed an interest in collaborating before both of their deaths, with their last conversation together being about Juice Wrld going to Florida to meet X. XXXTentacion was murdered in June 2018, while Juice Wrld died of a drug-induced seizure in December 2019.

On May 23, 2025, the artists' estates announced that the remix would be officially released as a single on May 30. A music video was released alongside the single, which features footage from children in Jamaica assisted by the XXXTentacion Foundation.

=== Charts ===
Chart performance for "Whoa (Mind in Awe)" (remix)
Chart (2025)	Peak position
New Zealand Hot Singles (RMNZ)	9
US Bubbling Under Hot 100 (Billboard)	16
US Hot R&B/Hip-Hop Songs (Billboard)	25
