= Banded Up =

2018 single by Ronny J featuring XXXTentacion

- 2018 single artwork

Single by Ronny J featuring XXXTentacion

from the album OMGRonny
- Released: February 16, 2018
- Recorded: 2018
- Genre: SoundCloud rap; hip-hop
- Length: 3:59 (single version); 2:53 (mixtape version)
- Label: Indie-Pop; Atlantic
- Songwriters: Ronald Spence Jr.; Jahseh Onfroy; Papi Yerr
- Producer: Ronny J

Ronny J singles chronology
"Thriller (Forever)" (2017)	"Banded Up" (2018)	"WOTR" (2018)

XXXTentacion singles chronology
"Fuck Love" (2018)	"Banded Up" (2018)	"Sad!" (2018)

Banded Up is a song by American producer and rapper Ronny J featuring fellow American rapper XXXTentacion. The single version was released on February 16, 2018, through Indie-Pop (independently popular) and Atlantic Records. A shorter version of the song was later included on Ronny J's debut commercial mixtape, OMGRonny.

The song was produced by Ronny J.

== Background ==
Ahead of the release of his debut commercial mixtape OMGRonny, Ronny J released "Banded Up" as the project's lead single. The song marked another collaboration between Ronny J and XXXTentacion, with Ronny J rapping over his own production and XXXTentacion appearing on the second verse.

== Critical reception ==
HotNewHipHop described the song as a "safe" collaboration between Ronny J and XXXTentacion, criticizing its repetitive hook and simple lyricism and pointing out that XXXTentacion's performance was reminiscent of his earlier musical style. Even though it regarded the track as having only limited appeal outside of party settings, the publication still found the combination of the two artists to be attractive and showed optimism regarding their future collaborations.

XXL described the instrumental produced by Ronny J as "frantic".

Pitchfork praised "Banded Up" refined production, describing the instrumentation as loud with a softer secondary rhythm layered over the synthesizers. However, the publication criticized XXXTentacion's guest verse as "unnecessary and jarring", arguing that it disrupted the song's overall atmosphere.

== Personnel ==
Credits adapted from Apple Music.

- Ronald Spence Jr. – performer, songwriter, producer
- Jahseh Onfroy – performer, songwriter
- Papi Yerr – songwriter
- Koen Heldens – mixing engineer
- John Alexander Crawford – mixing engineer
- Fabian Marasciullo – mixing engineer
