= A Ghetto Christmas Carol =

EP by XXXTentacion
- Released: December 11, 2017
- Recorded: September – November 2017
- Genres: Alternative rock; emo rap; hip-hop; political hip-hop
- Length: 9:09
- Label: Bad Vibes Forever
- Producers: XXXTentacion; Ronny J; Cubeatz; J Dilla

XXXTentacion chronology
17 (2017)	A Ghetto Christmas Carol (2017)	? (2018)

A Ghetto Christmas Carol is the tenth and final extended play by American rapper and singer-songwriter XXXTentacion. It is a Christmas-themed EP released on December 11, 2017, by Bad Vibes Forever. The production was handled primarily by fellow American record producer, Ronny J and XXXTentacion himself, alongside Cubeatz and J Dilla.

== Background and recording ==
A Ghetto Christmas Carol EP would be recorded in November 2017 and be completed in one weekend, according to Koen Heldens. Heldens would comment "trying to clean up the 808s on the title track, but X and producer Ronny J insisted to not clean it up, it's supposed to feel like an electric guitar for white people but felt through the bass in the trunk.' That experience taught me that sometimes being technically correct doesn't serve the creative process—music is about emotion and feel."

== Track listing ==
The EP includes a protest song by XXXTentacion against then-President Donald Trump, "Hate Will Never Win".

No.	Title	Writer(s)	Producer(s)	Length
1.	"A Ghetto Christmas Carol"	Jahseh Onfroy; Ronald Spence Jr.; Kevin Gomringer; Tim Gomringer	Ronny J; Cubeatz	1:44
2.	"Hate Will Never Win"	Onfroy	J Dilla	1:44
3.	"Up Like an Insomniac (Freestyle)"	Onfroy; Spence	XXXTentacion; Ronny J	2:31
4.	"Red Light!"	Onfroy; Spence	Ronny J	1:05
5.	"Indecision"	Onfroy	XXXTentacion; John Cunningham; Robert Soukiasyan	2:04
Total length:				9:09

Samples

- "hate will never win" contains samples from audio clips of Donald Trump and "Blue in Green" by Miles Davis.

== Personnel ==
Credits adapted from Tidal.

- XXXTentacion – vocals, composition, engineering, executive production, production
- Ronny J – composition, executive production, production
- Cubeatz – composition
- J Dilla – production
- Robbie Soukiasyan – engineering
- Koen Heldens – mixing
- Kevin Peterson – assistant mastering
- Dave Kutch – mastering

== Charts ==
Chart (2017)	Peak position
New Zealand Heatseeker Albums (RMNZ)	2
US Independent Albums (Billboard)	35
US R&B/Hip-Hop Album Sales (Billboard)	42
