= Matt Ox =

American rapper (born 2004)

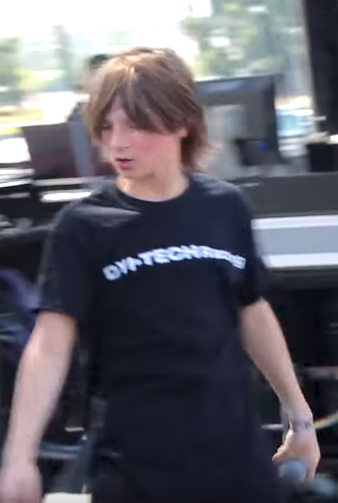
- Grau performing in Anaheim, California; 2017

Background information
- Born: Matthew Christopher Grau; December 13, 2004 (age 21); Lawncrest, Philadelphia, Pennsylvania, U.S.
- Genres: Alternative hip-hop; trap; tread
- Occupations: Rapper; singer; songwriter
- Years active: 2016–present
- Labels: Motown; Warner
- Producer(s): Working on Dying

Matthew Christopher Grau (born December 13, 2004), known professionally as Matt Ox, is an American rapper and singer from Philadelphia. He is best known for his 2017 single "Overwhelming", as well as his guest appearance on XXXTentacion's 2018 track "$$$", which received platinum certification by the Recording Industry Association of America (RIAA) and appeared the latter's album ? (2018).

== Early life ==
Ox was born in 2004. He is from Lawncrest, Philadelphia. Ox began pursuing hip hop when he was 11 years old. Since releasing music, Ox has been homeschooled.

== Career ==
Ox was 12 years old when he released the music video for the single "Overwhelming" in 2017 featuring instrumentals by Oogie Mane. He released singles with Warner before signing with Motown in 2018. In March 2018, he worked with rapper XXXTentacion on the song "$$$", which was featured on his sophomore album, ?. His debut album, Ox, was released October 30, 2018. It includes 11 songs less than three minutes long and has three songs featuring Chief Keef, Key!, and Valee. It was produced by Working on Dying, a Philadelphia-based production crew.

He released his mixtape Sweet 16 on December 13, 2020. He released his first solo extended play on February 12, 2021, a 5-track EP titled Unorthodox. The mixtape and the EP featured no guest appearances from other artists. Ox's second album Year of the Ox released on January 31, 2022. The album featured guest appearances from Lancey Foux and UnoTheActivist.

== Artistry ==
Ox's music has been called "dark trap music". Some of his favorite artists include Soulja Boy and Lil B.

== Discography ==
=== Studio albums ===
List of studio albums, with selected details
Title	Studio album details
Ox	Released: October 30, 2018; Label: Motown; Format: CD, digital download, streaming
Year of the Ox	Released: January 31, 2022; Label: OX Entertainment Group; Format: CD, digital download, streaming

=== Mixtapes ===
List of mixtapes, with selected details
Title	Mixtape details
Sweet 16	Release: December 13, 2020; Label: OX Entertainment Group; Format: Digital download, streaming
Teenrave	Release: December 13, 2022; Label: OX Entertainment Group; Format: CD, digital download, streaming
OXygen (with Surf Gang)	Release: April 20, 2023; Label: Surf Gang; Format: Digital download, streaming
Teenrage	Release: October 6, 2023; Label: OX Entertainment Group; Format: CD, digital download, streaming
I Don't Wanna Grow Up	Released: August 16, 2024; Label: OX Entertainment Group; Format: Digital download, streaming
Oxytape	Release: September 1, 2026; Label: OX Entertainment Group; Format: Digital download, streaming

=== Extended plays ===
List of EPs, with selected details
Title	EP details
Oxmas (with Zeus Ox and Ox Flacko)	Release: December 23, 2018; Label: OX Entertainment Group; Format: Digital download, streaming
Spooky Szn (with Zeus Ox and Ox Flacko)	Release: October 27, 2020; Label: OX Entertainment Group; Format: Digital download, streaming
Unorthodox	Release: February 12, 2021; Label: OX Entertainment Group; Format: CD, digital download, streaming
Ai.Ox	Release: March 31, 2023; Label: OX Entertainment Group; Format: CD, digital download, streaming
Oxi Is Alive	Release: December 13, 2024; Label: OX Entertainment Group; Format: Digital download, streaming

=== Singles ===
==== As lead artist ====
Title	Year	Album(s)
"Overwhelming"	2017	Non-album singles
"Messages"	2017	Non-album singles
"Athlete"	2017	Non-album singles
"Deposits"	2017	Non-album singles
"Tesla"	2018	Non-album singles
"Zero Degrees"	2018	Ox
"Jetlag" (featuring Chief Keef)	2018	Ox
"Bag" (with Dro Fe and TheGoodPerry)	2019	Non-album singles
"Oh Dam"	2019	Non-album singles

==== As featured artist ====
Title	Year	Album(s)
"Awesome" (Valee featuring Matt Ox)	2018	Non-album singles
"Kerwin Frost Scratch That" (10k.Caash featuring Matt Ox)	2019	The Creator
"PAUSE" (Jimmy Edgar featuring Matt Ox)	2020	Cheetah Bend
"Breakdown" (Andy Morin featuring Matt Ox)	2021	Non-album single
"No Limit" (TripSitMafia featuring Matt Ox)	2023	Non-album single
"Ice Castles" (Coucou Chloe featuring Matt Ox)	2023	Fever Dream
"HI-FASHION" (Ailow & Lizdek featuring Matt Ox & DJ Smokey)	2026	DUALITY

=== Other charted songs ===
Title	Year	Peak chart positions		Album(s)
Title	Year	US Bub.	US R&B/HH	Album(s)
"$$$" (with XXXTentacion)	2018	2	45	?
