= Before I Close My Eyes =

2018 song by XXXTentacion

Song by XXXTentacion

from the album ?
- Released: March 16, 2018
- Genre: Ballad
- Length: 1:40
- Label: Bad Vibes Forever; Caroline; Capitol
- Songwriters: Jahseh Onfroy; John Cunningham
- Producer: Cunningham

"Before I Close My Eyes" (stylized in all lowercase) is a song by American rapper XXXTentacion from his second studio album, ? (2018). Considered by critics to be some of his best work, the song features XXXTentacion singing about his regrets of his past wrongdoings and hopes for repentance. It was written by XXXTentacion and John Cunningham, and produced by Cunningham.

== Release and reception ==
The song was originally released as the outro to XXXTentacion's sophomore studio album, ? (2018). The song interpolates the children's bedtime lullaby, "Now I Lay Me Down to Sleep". The song features an acoustic and orchestral instrumental, while X sings about his hope for repentance, and that he hopes it is not too late for his redemption. The chorus repeats, "Before I lay me down to sleep, I pray the Lord my soul to keep, I hope it's not too late for me".

Critics from XXL and Legit.ng have described "Before I Close My Eyes" as one of X's best work. XXL wrote of the song's composition that "you can hear the hope and regret in the tone of [X's] voice," and was described by Mercy Mbuthia of Legit.ng as a "praye[r] for pardon" from X for his past wrongdoings.

After XXXTentacion was murdered, the song gained further attention due to controversy about X's past, particularly in regards to his alleged violence against his ex-girlfriend, as the song is detailing his repentance for his past actions. To some, the song highlights X's perceived improvements in character by the end of his life. Singer Miley Cyrus gave tribute to X by posting a screenshot of "Before I Close My Eyes" following X's death on her Instagram and Twitter.

== Certifications ==
Region	Certification	Certified units/sales
New Zealand (RMNZ)	Gold	15,000^{‡}
United States (RIAA)	Platinum	1,000,000^{‡}
^{‡} Sales+streaming figures based on certification alone.
