= Middle Child (PnB Rock and XXXTentacion song) =

2019 song by PnB Rock and XXXTentacion

Song by PnB Rock and XXXTentacion

from the album TrapStar Turnt PopStar
- Released: May 3, 2019
- Genre: Trap
- Length: 2:31
- Label: Atlantic
- Songwriters: Rakim Allen; Jahseh Onfroy; DatKidChris
- Producer: DatKidChris

Music video
- "Middle Child" on YouTube

"Middle Child" (stylized in all caps) is a song by American rappers PnB Rock and XXXTentacion, released from the former's second studio album TrapStar Turnt PopStar on May 3, 2019. It was produced by DatKidChris.

== Background ==
PnB Rock told Apple Music about his collaboration with XXXTentacion: "He really surprised me with 'MIDDLE CHILD,' because I wasn't even expecting to do that type of song with him. I was thinking I was gonna go one route, talking about how I came up, talking about how I got kicked out my mama's house. But he came on it and just started swagging on it. I'm like, nah, I gotta match that energy. I can't be so serious when he just having fun with this."

== Composition ==
The song finds PnB Rock and XXXTentacion trading "melodious bars" over a "distinctly trap soundscape". In the chorus, Rock reflects on his difficult childhood life, being the middle child of his family, and his legal trouble as a teenager. XXX boasts about having lots of money.

== Music video ==
The official music video was released on August 8, 2019. Directed by Derek Pike, it depicts child versions of PnB Rock and XXXTentacion. They hang out on a porch while watching action on the street, and connect a smoothie with chips, cream and a toy car, which they call "trap juice". They sell it for $5 a cup in their front yard. The drink becomes a financial success and soon the rappers have bought new chains with their profits. At the end of the video, PnB Rock cross his arms in an "X" symbol, as a tribute to the late XXXTentacion.

According to PnB Rock, he wanted the visual to be "fun and light-hearted" and remind him of the times he spent with XXXTentacion. He also received approval from X's mother Cleopatra Bernard to release the video.

== Charts ==
Chart (2019)	Peak position
New Zealand Hot Singles (RMNZ)	18
US Billboard Hot 100	91
US Hot R&B/Hip-Hop Songs (Billboard)	37
