= ? (XXXTentacion album) =

Studio album by XXXTentacion
- Released: March 16, 2018
- Recorded: 2017–2018
- Genres: Emo rap; alternative R&B; alternative hip hop
- Length: 37:27
- Labels: Bad Vibes Forever; Caroline; Capitol
- Producers: XXXTentacion; John Cunningham; Robert Soukiasyan; Dell Soda; Den Beats; Laron Wages; P. Soul; Rekless; Smash David; TM88; Tre Pounds; Z3N

XXXTentacion chronology
A Ghetto Christmas Carol (2017)	? (2018)	Skins (2018)

Singles from ?
- 1. "Sad!" Released: March 2, 2018; 2. "Changes" Released: March 2, 2018; 3. "Moonlight" Released: August 14, 2018

Alternate cover
- Deluxe Anniversary Edition cover

? is the second studio album by American rapper XXXTentacion, released through Bad Vibes Forever, Caroline Distribution, and Capitol Music Group on March 16, 2018. His last studio album to be released in his lifetime before his death three months later, it was primarily produced by frequent collaborator John Cunningham, includes a wide range of guest appearances from PnB Rock, Travis Barker of Blink-182, Joey Badass, Matt Ox, Rio Santana, Judah, and Carlos Andrez, and succeeds the release of his debut studio album 17 (2017) and the extended play A Ghetto Christmas Carol (2017).

Featuring more live instrumentation than 17, ? features an array of genres, including acoustic, emo, alternative rock, trap, and cloud rap. XXXTentacion's vocals on parts of the album are less restrained and lo-fi-esque compared to 17, with his vocals on introspective songs over piano and acoustic guitar chords being more projected. On other parts of the album, XXXTentacion's style resembles his underground sound, with him screaming. The album was supported by three singles: "Sad!", "Changes", and "Moonlight". Following XXXTentacion's death on June 18, 2018, "Sad!" topped the Billboard Hot 100, where XXXTentacion became the first act to earn a posthumous Hot 100 number-one single as a lead artist since The Notorious B.I.G. with "Mo Money Mo Problems" in 1997.

? received positive reviews from critics, and became XXXTentacion's first US number-one album, debuting at number one on the Billboard 200 with 131,000 album-equivalent units earned in its first week. The album has since been certified sextuple platinum by the Recording Industry Association of America (RIAA). ? is the most streamed hip-hop album on Spotify, amassing total of 10.3 billion streams. At the 2019 Billboard Music Awards, ? was nominated for Top Billboard 200 Album, among other nominations. An anniversary deluxe edition of the album was originally going to be released on July 26, 2019, but was pushed back to September 6, 2019, featuring the album's instrumentals, A Ghetto Christmas Carol, voice memos from the recording sessions of the album, and new material featuring American rapper Rico Nasty and Japanese video game composer Yoko Shimomura.

== Background ==
XXXTentacion released his debut studio album, 17 in August 2017 to commercial success. Following the release of the album, he announced he was quitting music due to negativity and backlash, though he eventually signed a $6 million one-album deal with Caroline Distribution and released A Ghetto Christmas Carol EP on his SoundCloud on December 11, 2017.

After the release of A Ghetto Christmas Carol, XXXTentacion announced he was preparing three new albums and eventually announced the titles of the albums as Bad Vibes Forever, Skins, and ?, after being released on house arrest on December 23, 2017. The track listing and release date was confirmed by XXXTentacion on March 12, 2018, via social media.

XXXTentacion recorded the album in December 23, 2017. He had entered the "Ugly" era, in which is when he had dyed his hair grey and shaved his eyebrows 3 months prior, likely around the time of recording the tracks, and dyed it indigo on January 1, 2018.

== Composition ==
A contrast to 17, the album features an array of genres, including alternative rock, emo, trap, acoustic, and cloud rap. The song "I Don't Even Speak Spanish lol" has been labelled as reggaeton pop, while "Infinity (888)" is a classic hip hop song. XXXTentacion's vocals on parts the album are less restrained and lo-fi-ish compared to 17, with his vocals over piano and acoustic guitar chords being more projected. On other parts of the album, XXXTentacion's style resembles his underground sound pre-"Look at Me", with him portraying anger through screaming.

== Promotion ==
The cover art was first shown on XXXTentacion's Instagram story on January 28, 2018, with the caption "coming soon". Later that day, he explained that:

"This albums not about the words, it's about the feeling...it'll be very hard to understand, but very easy to listen to...it's not what you're expecting, even if you feel like you understand my music, be prepared to not understand this music."

XXXTentacion released the song "Hope" on his SoundCloud on February 21, 2018, dedicated to the survivors of the Stoneman Douglas High School shooting. XXXTentacion later hosted a benefit show for the survivors on March 18, 2018, and offered condolences to the victims of the shooting. On February 25, 2018, after the release of "Hope", the rapper posted vague messages on social media accusing Canadian rapper Drake of threatening to murder him alongside crude photoshopped images of Drake. XXXTentacion proceeded to claim his accounts were hacked whilst there was speculation he was insulting the rapper for promotion of "Sad!" and "Changes".

=== Singles ===
The lead singles "Sad!" and "Changes" were released March 2, 2018, for streaming and digital download. "Sad!" debuted at number 17, and peaked at number one on the Billboard Hot 100, becoming XXXTentacion's first number-one song and his highest-charting single to date. XXXTentacion became the first act to earn a posthumous Hot 100 number-one single as a lead artist since The Notorious B.I.G. with "Mo Money Mo Problems" in 1997. "Changes" debuted at number 47 on the week beginning March 13, 2018, and peaked at number 18. The album's third single "Moonlight" was released posthumously to rhythmic radio on August 14, 2018. "Moonlight" peaked at 13 on the Billboard Hot 100 after XXXTentacion's murder.

The Rico Nasty remix of "#ProudCatOwner" was released in August 2019 as a promotional single for the album's deluxe edition.

== Critical reception ==
Professional ratings
Review scores
Source	Rating
AllMusic	3.5/5 stars
HotNewHipHop	70%
Salute Magazine	3/5
XXL	4/5

? received positive reviews from critics. In a favorable review, online publication HotNewHipHop stated that "Despite a sagging middle section, ? features some of X's most nuanced and impressive material to date", adding that "X's commitment to honoring his various influences is admirable, but it may have behooved him to spend a little bit more time on sequencing this artistic kaleidoscope." XXL gave the album a positive review, and wrote "The album sonically goes every which way—a double-edge sword that can make for a dizzying, disjointed listen at times. Still, ? is X's most stimulating offering to date and with a little more focus on structure and cohesion, X's best work could very well be ahead of him."

At the 2019 Billboard Music Awards, ? was nominated for Top Billboard 200 Album, among other nominations.

== Legacy ==
Trippie Redd’s album ! (2019) is a tribute to ?.

== Commercial performance ==
? debuted at number one on the US Billboard 200 with 131,000 album-equivalent units, with 20,000 pure album sales. It was XXXTentacion's only US number-one album during his lifetime. The album was certified platinum by the Recording Industry Association of America (RIAA) on August 7, 2018, and was later certified sextuple platinum in 2025.

? also reached number one in Canada, the Czech Republic, Denmark, Estonia, New Zealand, Norway, Slovakia, and Sweden. Following XXXTentacion's death, the album reached a new peak of number one in the Netherlands. It also ascended the Billboard 200 from number twenty-four to three, earning 94,000 units. As well as the United States, the album has been certified platinum in Canada, France, Italy, Sweden, and triple platinum in Denmark.

An anniversary deluxe edition of the album was originally going to be released on July 26, 2019, but was pushed back to September 6, 2019, featuring the album's instrumentals, the EP A Ghetto Christmas Carol (2017), voice memos from the recording sessions of the album, and new material featuring American rapper Rico Nasty and Japanese video game composer Yoko Shimomura.

== Track listing ==
Credits adapted from Tidal, YouTube Music and iTunes.

No.	Title	Writer(s)	Producer(s)	Length
1.	"Introduction (Instructions)"	Jahseh Onfroy	XXXTentacion	1:57
2.	"Alone, Part 3"	Onfroy; John Cunningham; Robert Soukiasyan	Cunningham; Soukiasyan	1:49
3.	"Moonlight"	Onfroy; Cunningham	Cunningham	2:15
4.	"Sad!"	Onfroy; Cunningham	Cunningham	2:46
5.	"The Remedy for a Broken Heart (Why Am I So in Love)"	Onfroy; Cunningham	XXXTentacion; Cunningham	2:40
6.	"Floor 555"	Onfroy; Alejandro Rodriguez	Dell Soda	1:33
7.	"Numb"	Onfroy; Cunningham; Soukiasyan; Oren Yoel	Cunningham; Soukiasyan^{[a]}	3:06
8.	"Infinity (888)" (featuring Joey Badass)	Onfroy; Jo-Vaughn Virginie; Brandon Beazer; James Hunter	P. Soul	2:56
9.	"Going Down!"	Onfroy; Bryan Simmons; Jeff LaCroix	TM88; Tre Pounds	1:55
10.	"Pain = Best Friend" (featuring Travis Barker)	Onfroy; Travis Barker; Cunningham; Soukiasyan	XXXTentacion; Travis Barker; Cunningham; Soukiasyan^{[a]}	1:41
11.	"$$$" (with Matt Ox)	Onfroy; Matthew Grau; Denmarc Mangupag; Laron Wages	Den Beats; Wages	2:10
12.	"Love Yourself (interlude)"	Onfroy; Cunningham	XXXTentacion; Cunningham	0:48
13.	"Smash!" (featuring PnB Rock)	Onfroy; Rakim Allen; Samuel Jimenez; Gabriel Tavarez	Smash David; Rekless	1:49
14.	"I Don't Even Speak Spanish LOL" (featuring Rio Santana, Judah and Carlos Andrez)	Onfroy; Flavio Santana; Judah Amar; Carlos Andrez; Franck Bondrille; John Crawford; Juan Guerrieri-Maril	Z3N	3:12
15.	"Changes"	Onfroy; Allen; Cunningham	Cunningham; XXXTentacion	2:01
16.	"Hope"	Onfroy; Cunningham	Cunningham	1:50
17.	"Schizophrenia"	Onfroy; Cunningham; Soukiasyan	Cunningham; Soukiasyan	1:20
18.	"Before I Close My Eyes"	Onfroy; Cunningham	Cunningham	1:39
Total length:				37:27

Deluxe Anniversary Edition – Disc 1
No.	Title	Producer(s)	Length
19.	"Alone, Part 3" (Instrumental)	Cunningham; Soukiasyan	1:49
20.	"Moonlight" (Instrumental)	Cunningham	2:15
21.	"Sad!" (Instrumental)	Cunningham	2:46
22.	"The Remedy for a Broken Heart (Why Am I So in Love)" (Instrumental)	XXXTentacion; Cunningham	2:40
23.	"Floor 555" (Instrumental)	Dell Soda	1:33
24.	"Numb" (Instrumental)	Cunningham; Soukiasyan^{[a]}	3:06
25.	"Infinity (888)" (Instrumental)	P. Soul	2:56
26.	"Going Down!" (Instrumental)	TM88; Tre Pounds	1:55
27.	"Pain = Best Friend" (Instrumental)	XXXTentacion; Cunningham; Soukiasyan^{[a]}	1:50
28.	"$$$" (Instrumental)	Den Beats; Wages	2:10
29.	"Love Yourself" (interlude) (Instrumental)	XXXTentacion; Cunningham	0:48
30.	"Smash!" (Instrumental)	Smash David; Rekless	1:49
31.	"I Don't Even Speak Spanish LOL" (Instrumental)	Z3N	3:12
32.	"Changes" (Instrumental)	Cunningham; XXXTentacion	2:02
33.	"Hope" (Instrumental)	Cunningham	1:50
34.	"Schizophrenia" (Instrumental)	Cunningham; Soukiasyan	1:20
35.	"Before I Close My Eyes" (Instrumental)	Cunningham	1:39
Total length:			1:13:19

Deluxe Anniversary Edition – Disc 2
No.	Title	Writer(s)	Producer(s)	Length
36.	"Nocturne" (performed by Yoko Shimomura)			2:11
37.	"Hope (Freestyle)"			2:18
38.	"Jah on Drums"			0:59
39.	"Numb" (Acoustic)			2:32
40.	"#ProudCatOwnerRemix" (featuring Rico Nasty)	Onfroy; Ronald Spence, Jr.; Maria-Cecilia Kelly	Ronny J	2:37
41.	"A Ghetto Christmas Carol"	Onfroy; Spence, Jr.; Kevin Gomringer; Tim Gomringer	Ronny J; Cubeatz	1:45
42.	"Hate Will Never Win"	Onfroy	J Dilla	1:44
43.	"Up Like an Insomniac (Freestyle)"	Onfroy; Spence, Jr.	XXXTentacion; Ronny J	2:31
44.	"Red Light!"	Onfroy; Spence, Jr.	Ronny J	1:05
45.	"Indecision"	Onfroy; Cunningham; Soukiasyan	XXXTentacion; Cunningham; Soukiasyan	2:04
46.	"Voice Memo 1: Alone, Part 3"			2:37
47.	"Voice Memo 2: Sad!"			3:38
48.	"Voice Memo 3: Moonlight"			2:29
49.	"Voice Memo 4: The Remedy for a Broken Heart"			2:29
50.	"Voice Memo 5: Going Down!"			1:40
51.	"Voice Memo 6: Changes"			3:29
52.	"Voice Memo 7: Before I Close My Eyes"			2:10
53.	"Voice Memo 8: Sad! Video Concept"			3:14
Total length:				1:54:51

Notes

- ^{^[a]} signifies a co-producer
- "Changes" features uncredited vocals by PnB Rock.
- "#ProudCatOwnerRemix" is a remix of the 2017 track "#ProudCatOwner #IHateRappers #IEatPussy"

Stylizations

- "Introduction (Instructions)" is stylized as "Introduction (instructions)".
- "Alone, Part 3", "Sad!", "Numb", "Smash!", and "#ProudCatOwnerRemix" are stylized in uppercase letters. For example, "Sad!" is stylized as "SAD!".
- "The Remedy for a Broken Heart (Why Am I So in Love)", "I Don't Even Speak Spanish LOL", and "Before I Close My Eyes" are stylized in lowercase letters, except for the word I.
- "Infinity (888)", "Going Down!", "Love Yourself", "Changes" and "Schizophrenia" are stylized in lowercase letters. For example, "Infinity (888)" is stylized as "infinity (888)".
- "Pain = Best Friend" is stylized as "Pain = BESTFRIEND".
- "Jah on Drums" is stylized in sentence case.

== Personnel ==
Credits adapted from Tidal and YouTube Music.

Performers

- XXXTentacion – vocals
- Joey Badass – vocals (track 8)
- Travis Barker – drums (track 10)
- Matt Ox – vocals (track 11)
- PnB Rock – vocals (track 13, 15)
- Rio Santana – vocals (track 14)
- Judah – featured artist (track 14)
- Carlos Andrez – featured artist (track 14)
- Yoko Shimomura – piano (track 36)
- Rico Nasty – featured artist (track 40)

Musicians

- XXXTentacion – guitar (track 17), piano (track 15)
- John Cunningham – guitar (tracks 2, 5, 7, 10, 12, 17, 18), piano (tracks 2, 7, 18), drums (track 2), keyboards (tracks 3, 4, 16), bass guitar (tracks 7, 10, 17), strings (tracks 15, 18)
- Robert Soukiasyan – drums (track 7), guitar (track 17)
- Travis Barker – drums (track 10)
- Adolfo Mercado – drums (track 17)
- Yoko Shimomura – piano (track 36)

Technical

- Dave Kutch – mastering (all tracks)
- Robert Soukiasyan – recording (tracks 1–3, 5–12, 15, 17, 18), mixing (tracks 1–3, 5–12, 15, 17)
- Kevin Peterson – mastering assistant (tracks 1–3, 5–11, 13, 14, 16–18), mastering (tracks 4, 15)
- John Cunningham – mixing (tracks 2, 5, 7, 10, 15, 16–18), recording (track 5)
- John Crawford – recording (tracks 2, 13, 14)
- Jahseh Onfroy – recording (track 4), mixing (track 12)
- Koen Heldens – mixing (track 4, 21, 40, 41, 42, 43, 44)
- Chris Quock – recording assistant (tracks 10, 17)
- Matt Malpass – recording (track 10)
- Z3N – recording (track 14), mixing (track 14)
- Karl Wingate – recording assistant (track 15)

Production

- XXXTentacion – production (tracks 1, 5, 10, 12)
- John Cunningham – production (tracks 2–5, 7, 10, 12, 15–18)
- Robert Soukiasyan – production (tracks 2, 17), co-production (tracks 7, 10)
- PnB Rock – co-production (track 15)
- Dell Soda – production (track 6)
- P. Soul – production (track 8)
- TM88 – production (track 9)
- Tre Pounds – production (track 9)
- Den Beats – production (track 11)
- Laron Wages – production (track 11)
- Smash David – production (track 13)
- Rekless – production (track 13)
- Z3N – production (track 14)

== Charts ==
=== Weekly charts ===
2018 weekly chart performance for ?
Chart (2018)	Peak position
Australian Albums (ARIA)	2
Austrian Albums (Ö3 Austria)	5
Belgian Albums (Ultratop Flanders)	3
Belgian Albums (Ultratop Wallonia)	3
Canadian Albums (Billboard)	1
Czech Albums (ČNS IFPI)	1
Danish Albums (Hitlisten)	1
Dutch Albums (Album Top 100)	1
Estonian Albums (IFPI)	1
Finnish Albums (Suomen virallinen lista)	2
French Albums (SNEP)	3
German Albums (Offizielle Top 100)	13
Hungarian Albums (MAHASZ)	20
Irish Albums (Official Charts)	2
Italian Albums (FIMI)	8
Japanese Albums (Oricon)	204
New Zealand Albums (RMNZ)	1
Norwegian Albums (VG-lista)	1
Polish Albums (ZPAV)	38
Portuguese Albums (AFP)	50
Scottish Albums (Official Charts)	73
Slovak Albums (ČNS IFPI)	1
Spanish Albums (Promusicae)	53
Swedish Albums (Sverigetopplistan)	1
Swiss Albums (Schweizer Hitparade)	4
UK Albums (Official Charts)	3
UK Album Downloads (Official Charts)	8
UK Independent Albums (Official Charts)	8
UK R&B Albums (Official Charts)	1
US Billboard 200	1
US Top R&B/Hip-Hop Albums (Billboard)	1

2024 weekly chart performance for ?
Chart (2024)	Peak position
Nigerian Albums (TurnTable)	86

=== Year-end charts ===
2018 year-end chart performance for ?
Chart (2018)	Position
Australian Albums (ARIA)	12
Austrian Albums (Ö3 Austria)	54
Belgian Albums (Ultratop Flanders)	19
Belgian Albums (Ultratop Wallonia)	50
Canadian Albums (Billboard)	8
Danish Albums (Hitlisten)	3
Dutch Albums (MegaCharts)	10
Estonian Albums (IFPI)	4
French Albums (SNEP)	33
German Albums (Offizielle Top 100)	79
Icelandic Albums (Tónlistinn)	12
Irish Albums (IRMA)	20
Italian Albums (FIMI)	37
New Zealand Albums (RMNZ)	6
Swedish Albums (Sverigetopplistan)	6
Swiss Albums (Schweizer Hitparade)	69
UK Albums (OCC)	31
US Billboard 200	9
US Top R&B/Hip-Hop Albums (Billboard)	6

2019 year-end chart performance for ?
Chart (2019)	Position
Australian Albums (ARIA)	29
Belgian Albums (Ultratop Flanders)	24
Belgian Albums (Ultratop Wallonia)	81
Canadian Albums (Billboard)	20
Danish Albums (Hitlisten)	20
Estonian Albums (IFPI)	20
French Albums (SNEP)	86
Icelandic Albums (Tónlistinn)	34
Irish Albums (IRMA)	40
Italian Albums (FIMI)	81
New Zealand Albums (RMNZ)	24
Swedish Albums (Sverigetopplistan)	39
UK Albums (OCC)	55
US Billboard 200	21
US Top R&B/Hip-Hop Albums (Billboard)	12

2020 year-end chart performance for ?
Chart (2020)	Position
Australian Albums (ARIA)	36
Austrian Albums (Ö3 Austria)	72
Belgian Albums (Ultratop Flanders)	23
Belgian Albums (Ultratop Wallonia)	162
Canadian Albums (Billboard)	48
Danish Albums (Hitlisten)	33
Dutch Albums (Album Top 100)	32
French Albums (SNEP)	131
Icelandic Albums (Tónlistinn)	58
Irish Albums (IRMA)	32
New Zealand Albums (RMNZ)	27
Swedish Albums (Sverigetopplistan)	62
UK Albums (OCC)	44
US Billboard 200	59
US Top R&B/Hip-Hop Albums (Billboard)	34

2021 year-end chart performance for ?
Chart (2021)	Position
Australian Albums (ARIA)	40
Austrian Albums (Ö3 Austria)	34
Belgian Albums (Ultratop Flanders)	27
Belgian Albums (Ultratop Wallonia)	77
Canadian Albums (Billboard)	47
Danish Albums (Hitlisten)	44
Dutch Albums (Album Top 100)	51
Icelandic Albums (Tónlistinn)	99
Norwegian Albums (VG-lista)	37
Swiss Albums (Schweizer Hitparade)	86
UK Albums (OCC)	66
US Billboard 200	74
US Top R&B/Hip-Hop Albums (Billboard)	50

2022 year-end chart performance for ?
Chart (2022)	Position
Australian Albums (ARIA)	60
Austrian Albums (Ö3 Austria)	57
Belgian Albums (Ultratop Flanders)	48
Belgian Albums (Ultratop Wallonia)	83
Danish Albums (Hitlisten)	76
Dutch Albums (Album Top 100)	82
German Albums (Offizielle Top 100)	100
Lithuanian Albums (AGATA)	100
Swiss Albums (Schweizer Hitparade)	94
US Billboard 200	89
US Independent Albums (Billboard)	9
US Top R&B/Hip-Hop Albums (Billboard)	64

2023 year-end chart performance for ?
Chart (2023)	Position
Belgian Albums (Ultratop Flanders)	85
Belgian Albums (Ultratop Wallonia)	111
Swiss Albums (Schweizer Hitparade)	73
US Billboard 200	120
US Independent Albums (Billboard)	19

2024 year-end chart performance for ?
Chart (2024)	Position
Australian Hip Hop/R&B Albums (ARIA)	32
Belgian Albums (Ultratop Flanders)	72
Belgian Albums (Ultratop Wallonia)	131
Swiss Albums (Schweizer Hitparade)	85
US Billboard 200	152

2025 year-end chart performance for ?
Chart (2025)	Position
Belgian Albums (Ultratop Flanders)	125
Belgian Albums (Ultratop Wallonia)	171

=== Decade-end charts ===
Decade-end chart performance for ?
Chart (2010–2019)	Position
US Billboard 200	46

== Certifications ==
Certifications and sales for ?
Region	Certification	Certified units/sales
Australia (ARIA)	Platinum	70,000^{‡}
Belgium (BRMA)	Gold	10,000^{‡}
Canada (Music Canada)	Platinum	80,000^{‡}
Denmark (IFPI Danmark)	5× Platinum	100,000^{‡}
France (SNEP)	3× Platinum	300,000^{‡}
Germany (BVMI)	Platinum	200,000^{‡}
Italy (FIMI)	2× Platinum	100,000^{‡}
Netherlands (NVPI)	Platinum	40,000^{‡}
New Zealand (RMNZ)	2× Platinum	30,000^{‡}
Norway (IFPI Norway)	2× Platinum	40,000^{‡}
Poland (ZPAV)	3× Platinum	60,000^{‡}
Singapore (RIAS)	Gold	5,000^{*}
Sweden (GLF)	Platinum	30,000^{‡}
United Kingdom (BPI)	2× Platinum	600,000^{‡}
United States (RIAA)	6× Platinum	6,000,000^{‡}
^{*} Sales figures based on certification alone.^{‡} Sales+streaming figures based on certification alone.

== Release history ==
Release dates for ?
Region	Date	Format(s)	Label	Ref.
Various	March 16, 2018	Streaming; digital download	Bad Vibes Forever	
Various	March 22, 2018	Vinyl	Bad Vibes Forever	
Various	June 1, 2018	CD	Bad Vibes Forever	
Various	September 6, 2019	Streaming; digital download; CD; vinyl (Deluxe Anniversary release)	Bad Vibes Forever	
