= Hate Will Never Win =

2017 song by XXXTentacion

Song by XXXTentacion

from the album A Ghetto Christmas Carol and ? (Deluxe Anniversary Edition)
- Released: December 11, 2017
- Genre: Political hip-hop; boom bap; hip-hop
- Length: 1:44
- Label: Bad Vibes Forever; Caroline; Capitol
- Songwriters: Jahseh Onfroy; James Dewitt Yancey
- Producer: J Dilla

"Hate Will Never Win" (stylized in all lowercase) is a song by American rapper XXXTentacion included on his tenth and final extended play A Ghetto Christmas Carol, and later re-released on the posthumous anniversary deluxe edition of his second studio album, ? through Bad Vibes Forever, Caroline Distribution, and Capitol Music Group. It was written by XXXTentacion and produced by J Dilla.

== Composition ==
"Hate Will Never Win" is built around the instrumental track "Life" by American record producer J Dilla. Unlike much of A Ghetto Christmas Carol, which features a return to the abrasive sound associated with XXXTentacion's earlier work, the song adopts a more restrained and old-school-inspired approach. It opens and closes with excerpts from president Donald Trump's remarks following the 2017 Unite the Right rally in Charlottesville, Virginia. Lyrically, XXXTentacion reflects on his public image, criticizes government institutions and Trump's political decisions, and discusses his desire to positively influence younger listeners. The song's use of Trump's remarks and politically charged themes distinguishes it from much of the material on the EP.

== Critical reception ==
The song received generally positive reviews from music critics. HotNewHipHop highlighted the song's restrained and "almost old-school" sound, praising XXXTentacion's performance and stating that he delivered "impressive bars" with a "dexterous flow" over J Dilla's production. The Boombox identified the track as one of the standout songs on A Ghetto Christmas Carol, noting its piano-driven instrumental and criticism of Donald Trump. iHipHop interpreted the song as carrying a message of unity and self-improvement, describing XXXTentacion as attempting to improve his moral character while encouraging social change. In a more mixed assessment, Genius argued that although the use of excerpts from Donald Trump's Charlottesville remarks suggested a political song, its message appeared more focused on XXXTentacion's personal grievances and public image than on broader political issues.

== Certifications ==
Certifications for "Hate Will Never Win"
Region	Certification	Certified units/sales
New Zealand (RMNZ)	Gold	15,000^{‡}
United States (RIAA)	Gold	500,000^{‡}
^{‡} Sales+streaming figures based on certification alone.
