= Don't Cry (Lil Wayne song) =

Single by Lil Wayne featuring XXXTentacion

from the album Tha Carter V
- Released: January 3, 2019
- Recorded: February 2018 and August 2018
- Genre: Emo rap
- Length: 4:09
- Label: Young Money; Republic
- Songwriters: Dwayne Carter; Jahseh Onfroy; Juan Guerrieri-Maril; Benjamin Diehl; Gamal Lewis
- Producers: Ben Billions; Z3N

Music video
- "Don't Cry" on YouTube

"Don't Cry" is a song by American rapper Lil Wayne featuring fellow American rapper XXXTentacion. "Don't Cry" was released as the second single from Lil Wayne's twelfth album Tha Carter V. The song uses vocals recorded by XXXTentacion prior to his death on June 18, 2018. It debuted and peaked at number five on the Billboard Hot 100 chart, where it became the second-highest charting song from the album and in XXXTentacion's discography.

== Background and release ==
The vocals used in "Don't Cry" by XXXTentacion were recorded prior to his death on June 18, 2018. Before the collaboration, Wayne did not know who XXXTentacion was. The collaboration between the two artists happened as a result of Young Money Entertainment's president Mack Maine acquiring the rights to use the verse while sequencing and putting together the track list of the album.

Lil Wayne performed the song live for the first time on The Late Show with Stephen Colbert on December 12, 2018.

The music video was released on January 23, 2019, on what would have been XXXTentacion's 21st birthday.

After being taken down, it was reuploaded on October 2, 2024.

== Credits and personnel ==
Credits and personnel adapted from the liner notes of Tha Carter V.

Recording

- Recorded at YM Studios
- Mixed at Just Us Studios (Los Angeles, California)
- Mastered at SING Mastering (Atlanta, Georgia)

Management

- Published by Young Money Publishing Inc/Warner Chappell Publishing (BMI), Bad Vibes Forever Inc./ Kobalt Publishing (ASCAP), Z3N Publishing, Billions Enterprises/Songs Of Kobalt Music Publishing (BMI), Food Fight Music / Where Da Kasz At — administered by Songs of Kobalt Music Publishing (BMI)
- XXXTentacion appears courtesy of Bad Vibes Forever, LLC

Personnel

- Lil Wayne - lead vocals, songwriting
- XXXTentacion - posthumous vocals, songwriting
- Ben Billions - production, songwriting
- Z3N - production, songwriting
- Gamal Lewis - songwriting
- Fabian Marasciullo - mixing
- McCoy Socalgargoyle - assistant engineering
- Colin Leonard - mastering
- Manny Galvez - recording
- Jason Delattiboudere - assistant recording
- John Cunningham - vocal production

== Charts ==
Chart (2018)	Peak position
Australia (ARIA)	50
Canada Hot 100 (Billboard)	19
Ireland (IRMA)	29
Sweden (Sverigetopplistan)	78
Switzerland (Schweizer Hitparade)	64
UK Singles (OCC)	28
US Billboard Hot 100	5
US Hot R&B/Hip-Hop Songs (Billboard)	4

== Certifications ==
Region	Certification	Certified units/sales
United States (RIAA)	Platinum	1,000,000^{‡}
^{‡} Sales+streaming figures based on certification alone.
