= Sad! =

2018 single by XXXTentacion

Single by XXXTentacion

from the album ?
- Released: March 2, 2018
- Recorded: 2017
- Genre: Emo rap; cloud rap; alternative R&B
- Length: 2:46
- Label: Bad Vibes Forever; Caroline
- Songwriters: Jahseh Onfroy; John Cunningham
- Producer: John Cunningham

XXXTentacion singles chronology
"Banded Up" (2018)	"Sad!" (2018)	"Changes" (2018)

Music video
- "SAD!" on YouTube

"Sad!" (stylized in all caps) is a song by American rapper XXXTentacion from his second studio album, ? (2018). It was released as the lead single from the album on March 2, 2018. The track was written alongside producer John Cunningham. The song is XXXTentacion's highest charting in the United States, peaking at number one on the Billboard Hot 100 following his death on June 18, 2018. It has also amassed more than 2 billion streams on Spotify, being one of the most streamed songs on the platform. The song remains X's biggest and arguably most popular hit song to date. It discusses X's experiences with depression, thoughts of suicide, and romantic turmoil, as well as his personal regrets about his past.

A music video for "Sad!" was released on June 28, 2018, via his YouTube channel. On August 13, 2021, the single was certified Diamond by the RIAA in the US. The song has since come to be regarded as XXXTentacion's signature song.

== Background ==
XXXTentacion began working with the producer for "Sad!", John Cunningham, in January 2018 after a preview of an acoustic song was uploaded to X's Instagram page showing Cunningham playing the guitar whilst X sung. On January 11, 2018, X uploaded a gaming video to his YouTube channel showing him playing the popular video game, PUBG: Battlegrounds. The intro to the video was a preview for "Sad!" and X further previewed the song a month later in a video on February 4, 2018, using it for his intro, after speculation the song was titled "SAD n Low" following a mass amount of snippets uploaded to YouTube. X went on to preview the song one more time in a YouTube video before its official release a few days later.

== Release and reception ==
On March 1, 2018, X announced he was releasing two songs from his upcoming album ?, saying on Instagram "Dropping two songs from my album tonight at 12:00 am est, play them more times than you can count." "Sad!" was released on March 2, 2018, on Spotify, Deezer, iTunes/Apple Music and Tidal alongside "Changes".

HotNewHipHop compared "Sad!" to the singles on X's debut album, 17 due to its emo hip hop aesthetic, saying "Once again, the young Floridian is veering into emo territory — with a lo-fi synth string loop and crisp percussion, the melodic ballad showcases X's ear for melody." XXL noted how the "upbeat instrumental" varied from the lyrics that shown XXX "struggling with depression and suicide over an ex-lover." Rap-Up also pointed out the "emo-melodies" that surround the track and spoke on the theme of suicidal thoughts over an ill-fated romance. The song has also amassed more than 2.4 billion streams on Spotify, being one of the most streamed songs on the platform.

On May 10, 2018, Billboard reported that the song was removed from Spotify playlists after their newly enacted "hateful conduct policy" came into effect. Six days after the playlist removal, the song's streams dropped 17 percent per day in the United States on average. The decision to remove X's music from curated playlists was later reversed after Top Dawg Entertainment CEO Anthony Tiffith and rapper Kendrick Lamar threatened to remove their music from the service if X's music was not reinstated.

== Chart performance ==
In the United States, "Sad!" debuted at number 17 on the Billboard Hot 100 in the week beginning March 12, 2018, becoming XXXTentacion's highest debuting and highest-charting song in the country, gaining 66 million streams in 12 days. The song later rose to number seven, making "Sad!" XXXTentacion's first top ten entry in the US.

In the United Kingdom, "Sad!" was at number 33 by the midweek, becoming X's highest-charting song in the country next to "Jocelyn Flores", which peaked at 39, and his second top 40 entry. The song officially debuted at number 26, becoming XXXTentacion's first top 30 hit in the country. "Sad!" reached the top 10 in Sweden, Australia, and New Zealand. It also reached the top 20 in Ireland, and the top 40 in Norway.

"Sad!" broke numerous commercial performance records following XXXTentacion's death. It amassed 10.4 million streams on Spotify on June 19, 2018, breaking the single-day record for streams on the platform. It jumped from number 52 to number one on the Billboard Hot 100 on the week beginning June 25, 2018. This made him the first act to earn a posthumous Hot 100 number-one single as a lead artist since The Notorious B.I.G. with "Mo Money Mo Problems" in 1997, and overall, the ninth artist to have topped the chart posthumously. "Sad!" official audio reached one billion YouTube views on January 14, 2021.

== Music video ==
Onfroy attends his old self's funeral in the music video, which was released ten days after his actual death

The music video for Onfroy's "Sad!" premiered one day after his memorial service at the BB&T Center on June 28, 2018. The video was written and "creative directed" by Onfroy himself, and directed by JMP. In the video, an older X attends the funeral of his younger self, which has his older split-dye yellow-black hair, the same hairstyle that was present in X's famous mugshot after being arrested on domestic violence charges. When X approaches the casket to look at his younger self, the younger X suddenly returns to life. The two begin fighting in the church and out in the alley. Before, during, and after the fight, a dark hooded figure speaks to X, asking various questions and advocating for a way of thinking centered on love rather than hate and for X to realize that the biggest enemy in his life has been himself. X defeats his younger self and leaves him lying on the ground in a completely white location. A piece of paper appears on the screen that reads, "People change, things change, and so did I." The video concludes with the words "LONG LIVE PRINCE X". Many interpreted the music video as a final message of remorse from X for his past actions. The video has over 161 million views across YouTube as of March 2023. The audio has over 1.2 billion views as of March 2023, making it his most popular YouTube video.

== Credits and personnel ==
Credits adapted from Tidal.

- Jahseh Onfroy – songwriting, composition
- John Cunningham – songwriting, composition, production
- Koen Heldens – mixing
- Kevin Peterson – mastering
- Dave Kutch – mastering

== Charts ==
=== Weekly charts ===
Weekly chart performance for "Sad!"
Chart (2018–19)	Peak position
Australia (ARIA)	4
Austria (Ö3 Austria Top 40)	5
Belgium (Ultratop 50 Flanders)	15
Belgium (Ultratop 50 Wallonia)	20
Canada Hot 100 (Billboard)	2
Czech Republic Singles Digital (ČNS IFPI)	1
Denmark (Tracklisten)	2
Estonia (IFPI)	18
Finland (Suomen virallinen lista)	12
France (SNEP)	8
Germany (GfK)	12
Greece (IFPI)	1
Hungary (Single Top 40)	28
Hungary (Stream Top 40)	2
Ireland (IRMA)	8
Italy (FIMI)	17
Netherlands (Dutch Top 40)	16
Netherlands (Single Top 100)	3
New Zealand (Recorded Music NZ)	3
Norway (VG-lista)	6
Portugal (AFP)	1
Scottish Singles Sales (Official Charts)	31
Slovakia Singles Digital (ČNS IFPI)	1
Spain (PROMUSICAE)	45
Sweden (Sverigetopplistan)	3
Switzerland (Schweizer Hitparade)	4
UK Singles (Official Charts)	5
UK Indie (Official Charts)	1
US Billboard Hot 100	1
US Hot R&B/Hip-Hop Songs (Billboard)	1
US Rhythmic Airplay (Billboard)	24

=== Year-end charts ===
2018 year-end chart performance for "Sad!"
Chart (2018)	Position
Australia (ARIA)	21
Austria (Ö3 Austria Top 40)	54
Belgium (Ultratop Flanders)	73
Belgium (Ultratop Wallonia)	93
Canada (Canadian Hot 100)	15
Denmark (Tracklisten)	11
Estonia (IFPI)	8
France (SNEP)	27
Germany (Official German Charts)	72
Ireland (IRMA)	39
Italy (FIMI)	64
Netherlands (Single Top 100)	36
New Zealand (Recorded Music NZ)	10
Portugal (AFP)	5
Sweden (Sverigetopplistan)	12
Switzerland (Schweizer Hitparade)	30
UK Singles (Official Charts Company)	46
US Billboard Hot 100	17
US Hot R&B/Hip-Hop Songs (Billboard)	12

2019 year-end chart performance for "Sad!"
Chart (2019)	Position
Portugal (AFP)	120

== Certifications ==
Certifications for "Sad!"
Region	Certification	Certified units/sales
Australia (ARIA)	5× Platinum	350,000^{‡}
Belgium (BRMA)	2× Platinum	80,000^{‡}
Brazil (Pro-Música Brasil)	3× Diamond	480,000^{‡}
Canada (Music Canada)	3× Platinum	240,000^{‡}
Denmark (IFPI Danmark)	2× Platinum	180,000^{‡}
France (SNEP)	Diamond	333,333^{‡}
Germany (BVMI)	Platinum	400,000^{‡}
Italy (FIMI)	2× Platinum	140,000^{‡}
Mexico (AMPROFON)	Platinum	60,000^{‡}
Netherlands (NVPI)	2× Platinum	160,000^{‡}
New Zealand (RMNZ)	5× Platinum	150,000^{‡}
Norway (IFPI Norway)	2× Platinum	120,000^{‡}
Poland (ZPAV)	3× Platinum	60,000^{‡}
Portugal (AFP)	3× Platinum	30,000^{‡}
Spain (Promusicae)	Platinum	60,000^{‡}
United Kingdom (BPI)	2× Platinum	1,200,000^{‡}
United States (RIAA)	Diamond	10,000,000^{‡}
Streaming
Greece (IFPI Greece)	Platinum	2,000,000^{†}
Sweden (GLF)	2× Platinum	16,000,000^{†}
^{‡} Sales+streaming figures based on certification alone.^{†} Streaming-only figures based on certification alone.
