= Hope (XXXTentacion song) =

2018 song by XXXTentacion

Promotional single by XXXTentacion

from the album ?
- Released: February 21, 2018
- Recorded: February 2018
- Genre: Emo rap
- Length: 1:45 (single version); 1:50 (? version)
- Label: Bad Vibes Forever; Empire; Capitol
- Songwriters: Jahseh Onfroy; John Cunningham
- Producer: John Cunningham

"Hope" is a song by American rapper XXXTentacion from his second studio album, ? (2018). It is dedicated to the victims of the Parkland high school shooting.

== Background ==
The song was released on February 21, 2018, as a promotional single for X's upcoming sophomore studio album, ?, which would be released on March 16, 2018. The song, dedicated to those who died in and survived the Parkland shooting, speaks of subject of survivor's guilt that may be experienced by those who survived the shooting, with X singing, "she keep cryin', she keep cryin' every single night ... Said I wanna die, yuh, no, I'm not alright, yuh" and sings of his hope for the survivors of the shooting, "So outside my misery, I think I'll find / A way of envisioning a better life / For the rest of us, the rest of us / There's hope for the rest of us, the rest of us". X also sings about the inaction of political officials following the shooting. The official cover for the song reads as a message from X, "I could never say I understand how you all are feeling, nor can I find the right words to say to you, but I do want you all to know, you are not alone. The words at the end of this song are dedicated to you, Douglas High. Sincerely, XXX."

X made headlines when he visited Anthony Borges, a survivor of the Parkland shooting, in the hospital while Borges was recovering from gunshot wounds. X had said in 2016 that he opposed gun control measures, citing this as one of the reasons he disliked 2016 Democratic nominee Hillary Clinton, though he wanted her to win over Republican nominee Donald Trump. X supported Bernie Sanders during the 2016 primary. However, X reversed his stance on the gun control issue following the Parkland shooting.

== Charts ==
=== Weekly charts ===
Weekly chart performance for "Hope"
| Chart (2018–2021) | Peak position |
|---|---|
| Canada Hot 100 (Billboard) | 68 |
| France (SNEP) | 131 |
| Ireland (IRMA) | 91 |
| Portugal (AFP) | 58 |
| Sweden (Sverigetopplistan) | 84 |
| Switzerland (Schweizer Hitparade) | 99 |
| US Billboard Hot 100 | 70 |

=== Year-end charts ===
2021 year-end chart performance for "Hope"
| Chart (2021) | Position |
|---|---|
| Portugal (AFP) | 187 |

== Certifications ==
Sale certifications for "Hope"
| Region | Certification | Certified units/sales |
|---|---|---|
| Brazil (Pro-Música Brasil) | Diamond | 160,000^{‡} |
| Denmark (IFPI Danmark) | Platinum | 90,000^{‡} |
| France (SNEP) | Diamond | 333,333^{‡} |
| Germany (BVMI) | Gold | 200,000^{‡} |
| Italy (FIMI) | Platinum | 100,000^{‡} |
| New Zealand (RMNZ) | 3× Platinum | 90,000^{‡} |
| Poland (ZPAV) | 2× Platinum | 100,000^{‡} |
| Portugal (AFP) | Platinum | 10,000^{‡} |
| Spain (Promusicae) | Gold | 30,000^{‡} |
| United Kingdom (BPI) | Platinum | 600,000^{‡} |
| United States (RIAA) | 6× Platinum | 6,000,000^{‡} |
Streaming
| Greece (IFPI Greece) | Gold | 1,000,000^{†} |
^{‡} Sales+streaming figures based on certification alone.^{†} Streaming-only figures based on certification alone.
