= Dave Kutch =

American mastering engineer

- Origin: New York City
- Genres: Pop
- Occupation: Mastering engineer
- Years active: 2007–present
- Website: themasteringpalace.com/engineer/dave-kutch/

Dave Kutch is an American mastering engineer. He has worked with artists Billie Eilish, The Weeknd, Alicia Keys, Blackpink, Karol G, Zara Larsson, Katy Perry, Calvin Harris, Afrojack, Janelle Monáe, Justin Timberlake, John Legend, Becky G, Andra Day, Ozzy Osbourne, Carlos Vives, Juanes, A$AP Rocky, A$AP Ferg, Blackbear, Glaive, XXXTentacion, Camila Cabello, Earl Sweatshirt and Zac Brown Band. He has been nominated for 14 Grammy Awards.

== Life and career ==
Dave Kutch started his career by working with other artists at The Hit Factory, Powers House of Sound, Masterdisk, and Sony Studios. In 2007, he created his own studio, called The Mastering Palace. In 2017, he won a Latin Grammy Award for Record of the Year for his work on Luis Fonsi's single "Despacito" (2017).

== Awards and nominations ==
=== Grammy Awards ===
Kutch has the following Grammy nominations and award.

| Year | Nominated work | Category | Result | Notes |
|---|---|---|---|---|
| 2014 | "Locked Out of Heaven" | Record of the Year | Nominated | |
| 2015 | "All About That Bass" | Record of the Year | Nominated | |
| 2016 | Beauty Behind the Madness | Album of the Year | Nominated | |
| 2017 | Lemonade | Album of the Year | Nominated | |
| 2017 | "Formation" | Record of the Year | Nominated | |
| 2018 | "Despacito" | Record of the Year | Nominated | |
| 2018 | "The Story of O.J." | Record of the Year | Nominated | |
| 2018 | 4:44 | Album of the Year | Nominated | |
| 2019 | H.E.R. | Album of the Year | Nominated | |
| 2019 | Voicenotes | Grammy Award for Best Engineered Album, Non-Classical | Nominated | |
| 2020 | I Used to Know Her | Album of the Year | Nominated | |
| 2021 | Chilombo | Album of the Year | Nominated | |
| 2022 | Happier Than Ever | Album of the Year | Nominated | |
| 2022 | "Happier Than Ever" | Record of the Year | Nominated | |
| 2026 | Mutt | Album of the Year | Nominated | |
