= Hold You =

Hold You may refer to:

- Hold You (album), by Gyptian, 2010
  - "Hold You" (Gyptian song), the title song
- "Hold You" (ATB song), 2001
- "Hold You" (Hanna Ferm and Liamoo song), 2019
- "Hold You", a song by Rostam from Half-Light, 2017
- "Hold You", a song by Orchestral Manoeuvres in the Dark from Crush, 1985
