= I'm Yours (Sizzla album) =

Studio album by Sizzla
- Released: August 11, 2017
- Genre: Reggae, Tropical, Ska, Dancehall, afro pop
- Length: 37:04
- Label: FX Music Group
- Producer: JonFX

I'm Yours is a studio album by Jamaican Reggae musician Sizzla. It was released on August 11, 2017 and produced by JonFX. It features 11 tracks and was supported by the lead single I'm yours. It includes a guest appearance from Stonebwoy and Mz Vee. The album experiments with a variety of genres, such as afro pop, tropical house, and ska.

The album peaked at number 2 on the US Billboard Charts Top Reggae Albums and number 4 on US Billboard Heatseekers Albums (South Atlantic) Charts first-week.

== Personnel ==
- Sizzla – primary artist, songwriter
- Jon FX – producer
- Jean Michel Padilla – mixing engineer
- Lmr Pro - mixing engineer
- Koen Heldens – mixing engineer, mastering engineer

== Charts ==
Chart	Peak position
US Reggae Albums (Billboard)	2
US Heatseekers Albums (Billboard)	4
