= JonFX =

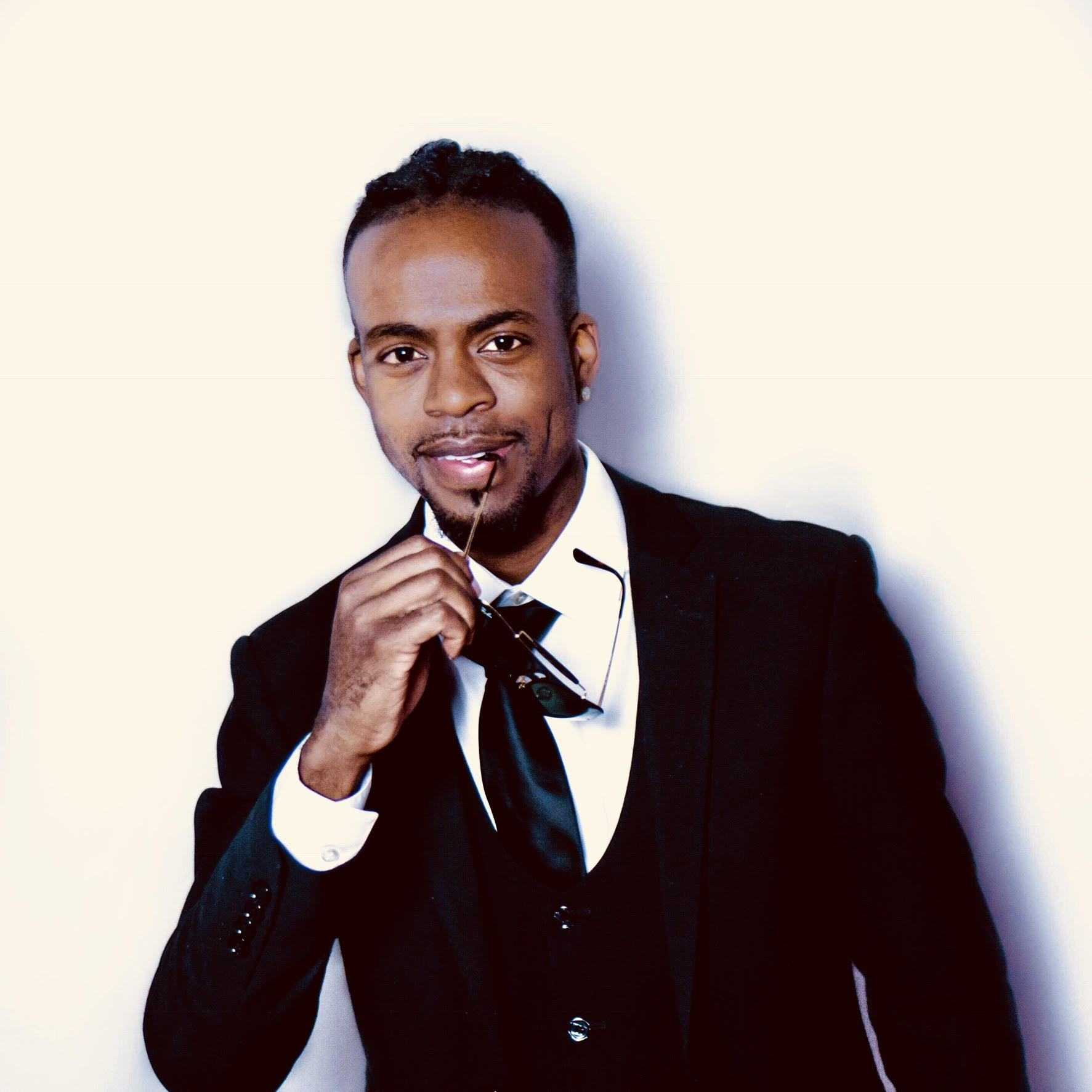

Background information
- Born: John Alexander Crawford; May 31, 1983 (age 43)
- Origin: St. Andrews, Jamaica
- Genres: Hip hop; R&B
- Occupations: Producer, songwriter, artist
- Instruments: Bass guitar, guitar, drums, piano
- Years active: 2002–present

John Alexander Crawford (born May 31, 1983), professionally known as JonFX, is a Jamaican record producer from St. Andrews, Jamaica. He has worked with dancehall and reggae artists Shabba Ranks, I Wayne, Vybz Kartel, Gyptian and Akon, as well as late rapper XXXTentacion. In June 2018, he was appointed as a governor on the board of the Florida Grammy Chapter.

In November 2018, Arms Around You, a song produced by JonFX, entered the Billboard Hot 100 at number 28; Streaming Songs Chart at number 18; R&B Streaming Songs Chart at number one; and Digital Sales Chart at number 18. He produced Sizzla Kalonji's I'm Yours, which made to the Billboard Reggae chart and Billboard Heatseeker's chart at No. 3 and No. 4.

== Career ==
JonFX produced Gyptian's Hold Yuh and an album of the same name in 2010. In 2017, he produced Sizzla's I'm Yours, which entered both the Billboard Reggae chart and Billboard Heatseeker's chart at No. 3 and No. 4. Crawford also mixed XXXTentacion's hit Jocelyn Flores which peaked at number No. 19 on the Billboard Hot 100 and has been certified platinum in the United States.

Some of his credits include, Gun Session featuring Akon, Young Jeezy, Shabba Ranks and Vybz Kartel; Nah Let Go and I Can Feel Your Pain by Gyptian and Baby, a collaboration between Sean Paul, Shabba Ranks and Erup. He also has been credited as writer and engineer on three tracks, Alone, Part 3, Smash and I Don't Even Speak Spanish LOL, from XXXTentacion's platinum-selling album.

He currently serves as a governor on the board of the Florida Grammy Chapter.

=== Discography ===
- List of features with other performing artists, showing year released and song title

Peak Chart Positions

Year	Album details	Billboard 200	Top R&B/Hip-Hop Albums	Top Heatseekers	Top Reggae Albums
2018	"Arms Around You" – XXXTentacion: Released:October 25, 2018; Label: Warner Bros, Bad Vibes, Forever, EMPIRE	–	1	–	–
2017	"I'm Yours" – Sizzla Kalonji: Genre: Hip-Hop/Rap; Label: R&B Edition	–	–	4	3
2008	"I Can Feel Your Pain" – Gyptian: Released: November 3, 2008; Label: VP Records; Genre: Reggae	–	–	–	4
2010	Hold You (album) – Gyptian: Released: July 19, 2010; Label: VP Records; Genre: Reggae	186	34	6	2
2014	Germination – Sade Serena: Released: May 3, 2014; Label: Uprize Music; Genre: R&B / Pop / Dance	–	–	2	–

=== 1997–present ===
Year	Artist(s)	Title	Album name	Participation	Label
2020	Vybz Kartel, JonFX	"Stay With Me"	Single	Producer	Zojak World-Wide
2020	Vybz Kartel	"Cute Rider Reggaton"	Single	Producer	Zojak World Wide, FX Music Group
2019	XXXTentacion	"Hot Gyal”	Single	Producer	Warner Bros, Bad Vibes, Forever, EMPIRE
2019	XXXTentacion	"Royalty”	Single	Producer	Warner Bros, Bad Vibes, Forever, EMPIRE
2018	XXXTentacion	"Arms Around You”	Single	Producer	Warner Bros, Bad Vibes, Forever, EMPIRE
2017	XXXTentacion	"Jocelyn Flores”	Jocelyn Flores	Mixer	Empire Distribution
2017	Sizzla	"I'm Yours"	I'm Yours	Producer	FX Music Group
2016	Kevin Lyttle featuring Mýa	"Bum Bum”	Single	Producer	Tarakon Records
2015	Bounty Killer	"Been Bad”	Been Bad Riddim	Producer	K1 Ent
2015	Yo Gotti ft Plane Jaymes	"Water Wet”	Single	Producer	Universal Music Publishing Group
2015	KD Aubert	"Falling”	Single	Producer	Roseland Records
2014	Sade Serena	"Sound of Love"	GermiNation	Producer	IDMDWorldwide
2014	Sade Serena	"Stranger”	GermiNation	Producer	IDMDWorldwide
2014	Ce'cile & Ja'rae	"Corrupt"	Single	Producer	SoBe Entertainment
2013	Sizzla	"Guess Who”	Single	Producer	–
2013	Louie Rankin	"Original Jamaican Don”	Single	Producer	
2012	Wayne Wonder	"Get Red”	Bikini Riddim	Producer	The Orchard Music (on behalf of JonFx Music)
2012	Don Yute ft (feat. Amerika)	"Drive Me Wild”	Single	Producer	Cool Ruckus Records
2012	Terro 3000	"Turn You On”	Bikini Riddim	Producer	The Orchard Music (on behalf of JonFx Music)
2012	Yanique Sasha	"Party”	Bikini Riddim	Producer	The Orchard Music (on behalf of JonFx Music)
2011	Gyptian	"Love Against The Wall"	Hold You	Producer	VP Records
2011	Gyptian	"Nah Let Go”	Hold You	Producer	VP Records
2010	Pressure	"Turn Me On”	Single	Producer	JonFX Music
2010	Vybz Kartel	"She Love”	Thunder Ball Riddim	Producer	JonFx Music
2010	Aidonia	"Thunderous Clap”	Thunder Ball Riddim	Producer	JonFx Music
2010	Munga	"Fraid A We”	The Biggest Ragga Dancehall Anthems 2007	Producer	WMG (on behalf of ADA UK); The Royalty Network (Publishing), and 9 Music Rights Societies
2010	Stein	"Slow Motion”	Thunder Ball Riddim	Producer	The Orchard Music (on behalf of JonFx Music); ASCAP, and 2 Music Rights Societies
2010	Flexx	"Bus My Gun”	Thunder Ball Riddim	Producer	JonFx Music
2009	Sean Paul feat. Shabba Ranks & Erup"Baby	"Baby”	Cloud Nine Riddim	Producer	Platinum Camp Records
2009	Turbulence	"Cloud Nine”	Cloud Nine Riddim	Producer	Platinum Camp Records
2009	Mavado	"David's Psalm”	Mr. Brooks...A Better Tomorrow	Producer	VP Records
2009	Mavado	"Welcome to the Armagedeon”	Mr. Brooks...A Better Tomorrow	Producer	VP Records
2008	Bounty Killer	"Book of Life"”	Book of Life	Producer	VP Records
2008	Gyptian	"I Can Feel Your Pain”	I Can Feel Your Pain	Producer	VP Records
2007	Sizzla	"Cost of Living"	The Overstanding	Producer	Babygrande Records/Dame Dash Music Group
2006	Wayne Wonder	"You"	One More Chance	Producer	DJ Obsession/JonFx Music Production
2004	Glen Adams w/ JonFx and The Slackers and Friends	"Schooling the Youth"	The Overstanding	Producer	Babygrande Records/Dame Dash Music Group
2000	Scuba	"Blessed Love"	–	Producer	
1999	Half Pint	"My Donna”	–	Producer	Caveman Records
1998	Vybz Kartel	"Gun Session”	–	Producer	Greensleeves Records
1997	Spragga Benz	"Pum Pum”	–	Producer	–
2022	SPIKY, Honorebel, Third World Don	"AssMazing"	Single	Producer	Diamond Distro

== See also ==
- List of Jamaican record producers
