= Everybody Dies in Their Nightmares =

2017 song by XXXTentacion

Song by XXXTentacion

from the album 17
- Released: August 25, 2017
- Genre: Alternative hip hop; emo rap; lo-fi
- Length: 1:35
- Label: Bad Vibes Forever; Empire
- Songwriters: Jahseh Onfroy; Ciara Nicole Simms
- Producer: Potsu

"Everybody Dies in Their Nightmares" is a song by American rapper XXXTentacion from his debut studio album 17 (2017). It was produced by Potsu and features vocals from Shiloh Dynasty.

== Composition ==
In the song, XXXTentacion raps in a rapid-fire rhythm and monotonous tone, in reflection of having suicidal thoughts and seemingly accepting his fate of doom.

== Critical reception ==
"Everybody Dies in Their Nightmares" has been considered a "standout" song from 17 by music critics. XXL ranked it as the fifth best song by XXXTentacion in 2019.

== Charts ==
=== Weekly charts ===
Chart (2017–2018)	Peak position
Austria (Ö3 Austria Top 40)	72
Canada Hot 100 (Billboard)	34
Denmark (Tracklisten)	40
Estonia (Eesti Tipp-40)	19
France (SNEP)	93
Ireland (IRMA)	37
Italy (FIMI)	56
Latvia (DigiTop100)	88
Netherlands (Single Top 100)	58
New Zealand Heatseekers (RMNZ)	1
Norway (VG-lista)	32
Sweden (Sverigetopplistan)	33
Switzerland (Schweizer Hitparade)	54
UK Singles (Official Charts)	88
US Billboard Hot 100	42
US Hot R&B/Hip-Hop Songs (Billboard)	22

=== Year-end charts ===
Chart (2018)	Position
Estonia (IFPI)	75

== Certifications ==
Region	Certification	Certified units/sales
Denmark (IFPI Danmark)	Platinum	90,000^{‡}
France (SNEP)	Diamond	333,333^{‡}
Germany (BVMI)	Gold	200,000^{‡}
Italy (FIMI)	Platinum	50,000^{‡}
New Zealand (RMNZ)	3× Platinum	90,000^{‡}
United Kingdom (BPI)	Platinum	600,000^{‡}
United States (RIAA)	3× Platinum	3,000,000^{‡}
^{‡} Sales+streaming figures based on certification alone.
