= Carry On (XXXTentacion song) =

2017 song by XXXTentacion

Song by XXXTentacion

from the album 17
- Released: August 25, 2017
- Genre: Alternative hip hop; emo rap; lo-fi
- Length: 2:09
- Label: Bad Vibes Forever; Empire
- Songwriters: Jahseh Onfroy; Ciara Nicole Simms
- Producers: Jahseh Onfroy; Potsu

"Carry On" is a song by American rapper XXXTentacion from his debut studio album 17 (2017) released through Bad Vibes Forever and Empire Distribution on August 25, 2017. It was produced by Potsu and features vocals sampled from Shiloh Dynasty.

== Composition ==
"Carry On" is a melancholy, sample-based track from 17 that highlights XXXTentacion's introspective lyrics, delivered in a more aggressive way, and contributes to the somber sound of the album. The song has been considered a "standout" track on the project by fans and music critics. Pitchfork described “Carry On” as a song that alludes explicitly to XXXTentacion's ex-girlfriend and reflects the artist's emotional turmoil The song emphasizes perseverance through emotional pain, expressing the importance of continuing forward despite feelings of depression or despair.

== Personnel ==
Credits adapted from Apple Music.

- Jahseh Onfroy - artist, songwriter
- Ciara Simms - songwriter
- Potsu - producer

== Charts ==
Chart (2017)	Peak position
Canada Hot 100 (Billboard)	100
US Billboard Hot 100	95
US Hot R&B/Hip-Hop Songs (Billboard)	49

== Certifications ==
Region	Certification	Certified units/sales
Denmark (IFPI Danmark)	Gold	45,000^{‡}
France (SNEP)	Gold	100,000^{‡}
Italy (FIMI)	Gold	35,000^{‡}
New Zealand (RMNZ)	Platinum	30,000^{‡}
United Kingdom (BPI)	Silver	200,000^{‡}
United States (RIAA)	Platinum	1,000,000^{‡}
^{‡} Sales+streaming figures based on certification alone.
