= Nightmares (Chris Brown song) =

Single by Chris Brown featuring Byron Messia

from the album 11:11
- Released: November 7, 2023
- Recorded: 2023
- Genre: Afrobeats; dancehall
- Length: 3:08
- Label: RCA; CBE
- Songwriters: Christopher Brown; Byron Messia; Haile Alexander; Malcolm Olagundoye; Ryan Press
- Producers: Chris Brown; Chopstix

Chris Brown singles chronology
"Sensational" (2023)	"Nightmares" (2023)	"FTCU (SleezeMix)" (2024)

Music video
- "Nightmares" on YouTube

"Nightmares" is a song recorded by American singer Chris Brown featuring Jamaican-born Kittitian singer Byron Messia, from the former's eleventh studio album 11:11. The song was released as the album's third single on November 7, 2023. With Chris trying to really capture the vision of music really being translucent to any kind of genre

== Background and release ==
In June 2023 Chris Brown previewed on his Instagram account a remix to Byron Messia's 2023 single "Talibans", that ended up never being released officially. In August, Brown performed in Kingston, Jamaica for his Under the Influence Tour, and was spotted filming a music video with Sean Kingston and Messia at Tivoli Gardens during his days in the country. Messia later talked about working with the R&B singer during an interview with Power 105.1 FM, saying: "Look out for Chris Brown featuring me. He actually did the 'Talibans' Remix and he said 'This is fire.' So we just decided to work on something new. He sent me some stuff and I did my verse and sent it back". The track was eventually released three days prior to the dropping of Brown's eleventh album titled 11:11.

== Composition ==
"Nightmares" is an Afrobeats and dancehall song, written by Brown, Messia, Haile Alexander, Malcolm Olagundoye and Ryan Press, with its production being handled by Chopstix and Chris Brown. Lyrically, the song is about a downhearted gangster who found himself leaning on vices due to overwhelming feelings of hopelessness.

== Music video ==
On November 7, 2023, Brown uploaded the music video for "Nightmares" on his YouTube account. The video was shot in August 2023 at Tivoli Gardens, Kingston, and directed by Travis Colbert and Brown. Singer Sean Kingston makes a cameo appearance in the video.

== Charts ==
Chart performance for "Nightmares"
Chart (2023)	Peak position
New Zealand Hot Singles (RMNZ)	25
UK Singles (Official Charts)	73
US Hot R&B Songs (Billboard)	22
