= 11:11 (Chris Brown album) =

Studio album by Chris Brown
- Released: November 10, 2023
- Recorded: 2022–23
- Studios: Calabasas Sound, Los Angeles
- Genres: R&B; pop; Afrobeats; dancehall
- Length: 67:53
- Labels: RCA; CBE
- Producers: DSTRK; Gabriel Roland; Ksj Beats; Leon "Roccstar" Youngblood; Deyontre “Trey Lawson” Lawson; Hitmaka; Troy Taylor; Fridayy; Phillip "DJ Hardwerk" Constable; Toney Martinez; Sad Money; DJ Fricktion; BigRagee; Emman; Krazytunez; XQ; Christopher Bivins (Buddafly Wolf); Derelle Rideout; HAZE; Prince Youngblood; J. Mixx; Ryan Press; Bizness Boi; Chopstix; Fecony; Its2Ezzy; Murphy Kid; Fortune; GABE; Keith Ingram; Leandro "Dro" Hidalgo; Teezio; Stefano Pigliapoco; Akinlolu; Chizzy Stephens; ThankYouDish; DJ Fricktion; Diego Ave; Pitt Tha Kid; The Breed; Track King Cole; Deshaun L. Cannon; SprngBrk; Jirou Street; Avdeon; Cody Tarpley; Sterling Gittens Jr.

Chris Brown chronology
Breezy (2022)	11:11 (2023)	Brown (2026)

Singles from 11:11
- 1. "Summer Too Hot" Released: June 23, 2023; 2. "Sensational" Released: October 20, 2023; 3. "Nightmares" Released: November 7, 2023

Deluxe edition cover
- 11:11 (Deluxe)

Singles from 11:11 (Deluxe)
- 1. "Residuals" Released: September 10, 2024

11:11 is the eleventh studio album by American singer and songwriter Chris Brown. It was released digitally on November 10, 2023, by RCA Records and CBE. The expanded edition titled 11:11 (Deluxe) was released on April 11, 2024. Production was handled by Brown himself and several record producers, including RoccStar, Hitmaka, Troy Taylor, Boi-1da and Fridayy. 11:11 features guest appearances from Byron Messia, Future, Maeta, Fridayy, Davido and Lojay, with the deluxe edition having additional features from Lil Wayne, Bryson Tiller, Joyner Lucas, Tee Grizzley and Mario. It serves as the follow-up to his tenth studio album Breezy (2022).

Musically, 11:11 is a double album that mixes R&B, pop, Afrobeats and dancehall and its lyrical themes include romantic relationships, sexuality and self-reflection. The album received positive reviews from music critics, who praised its sound and Brown's performances. At the Grammy Awards, 11:11 (Deluxe) won Best R&B Album, while the tracks "Summer Too Hot" and "Residuals" were nominated for Best R&B Performance, and "Sensational" was nominated for Best African Music Performance. 11:11 also won Top R&B Album at the 2024 Billboard Music Awards and was nominated for Album of the Year at the 2024 BET Awards.

Commercially, 11:11 debuted at number nine on the US Billboard 200, making it his 12th consecutive top-ten album in the country. The singles "Summer Too Hot", "Sensational" and "Nightmares" were released in the album's promotion. "Residuals" was released as the only single from the deluxe edition of 11:11. Despite not being released as a single, the album's opening track "Angel Numbers / Ten Toes" became its most successful song worldwide, reaching the top ten in several countries. To support the release of the album, Brown embarked on his "The 11:11 Tour" in North America, South Africa and Brazil.

== Background and recording ==
The album's title is derived from the numerological belief of the same name, and is connected to the fact of it being the singer's eleventh studio album. The recording sessions for 11:11 and its deluxe version, released five months later, spanned a year and a half from 2022 to 2024. Some of the material for 11:11 (Deluxe) was recorded during the production of the standard album.

On October 24, 2023, while promoting the album on social media, Brown wrote on his Instagram Story: "11th album, I still pinch myself and have frequent [spats] of imposter syndrome. I'm extremely thankful and appreciative of how far I’ve come and the people who got me here. I continue to strive higher. MUSIC IS A CHOICE AND I THANK YOU FOR CHOOSING ME."

== Composition ==
11:11 is a double album, with its two sides containing 11 tracks each. The album's musical style mixes R&B, pop music, Afrobeats and dancehall. According to Kayla Sandiford of Renowned for Sound, 11:11 "seeks to make use of a range of rhythmic elements", with Brown incorporating Afrobeats "on various tracks which embrace a funkier, percussion-driven feel". Lyrically, 11:11 mostly features lighthearted content, while also containing tracks where Brown faces themes of anxiety and regret. AllMusic's TiVo Staff found its lyrical content to be "a little more romantic" than the singer's previous album Breezy.

== Artwork ==
The album's artwork was designed by Courtney Walter, and depicts four images of Brown standing to form 11:11's title. The head shots used to form the colon include the singer with black and blonde hair, the juxtaposition symbolizes the negative and the positive in life. The colors used in each of the standing images are a nod to body chakras: yellow (manipura – solar plexus chakra symbolizing wisdom and power), indigo (ajna – third eye chakra symbolizing awareness), blue (vishuddha – throat chakra symbolizing communication), and green (anahata – heart chakra symbolizing love and healing) and tie in with the spiritual meaning of "11:11". Brown used similar imagery in the lyrics of his 2019 song "Indigo", from the album Indigo.

Exclaim! listed the album cover as 16th worst of 2023, writing: "One Chris Brown is already too many, so this just feels cruel. But we tried wishing his career away on it anyway — fingers crossed!" The deluxe version's cover was listed by Exclaim! as 20th worst of 2024, although "this one gets points for covering his face."

== Release and promotion ==
On May 19, 2023, Brown teased the release of new music on his Instagram account, writing: "Y'all ready for some new music? Been locked in the studio". He stated, "No more 20- to 40-song albums", hinting that his next album would mark a departure from the length of his previous three albums: Heartbreak on a Full Moon, Indigo and Breezy. On that same day, he announced the release of "a single for the summer". On June 17, Brown officially announced the album's lead single "Summer Too Hot", along with its release date of June 23, 2023, on his Instagram account.

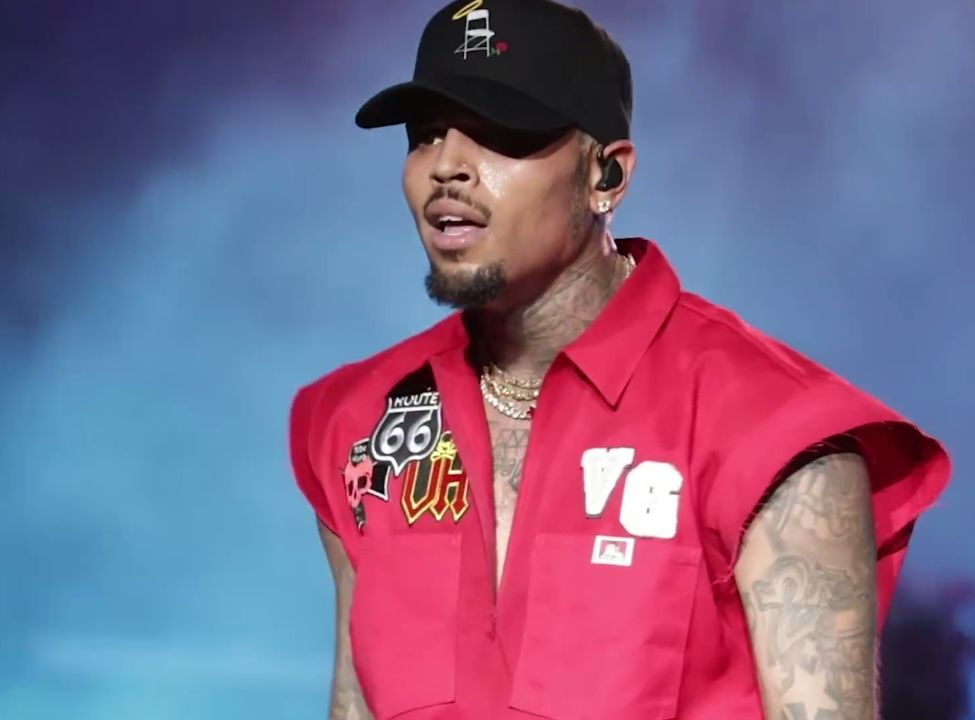
Brown performing during his "Under the Influence Tour" at Jamaica National Stadium in 2023.

On August 17, he unveiled the album's title, 11:11, along with its release date of November 11, 2023, and stated that it would contain 11 songs. On September 29, the singer announced that the album was "complete", sharing a possible black and white album cover. On October 17, 2023, Brown revealed the second single from the album, titled "Sensational" featuring Lojay and Davido, with a video in which he performs choreography with his dance crew. On October 20, 2023, Brown released "Sensational" along with a music video directed by videographer Child. On October 21, Brown revealed the official album cover and announced that the album would be a double disc consisting of two sides, each featuring 11 tracks. He stated that the first part would be released at 11 AM and the final part at 11 PM on November 11. On November 2, Brown previewed a new song on his Instagram supposedly titled "Walking on 10 Toes". On November 4, the singer previewed another track titled "No One Else" featuring Fridayy. The album's tracklist was revealed on November 6, confirming guest appearances from Byron Messia, Future, and Fridayy, teasing two other guests scheduled to be revealed on a later date. The following day, the song "Nightmares" featuring Byron Messia was released alongside its music video. On November 9, Brown announced that 11:11 would be released on November 10, a day earlier than what previously announced. A few hours before the release of 11:11, its last track was changed from the previously announced "Double Negative", which features Justin Bieber, to a track called "Views". Brown explained the last minute change on his Instagram account on the album's release day: "Double negative unfortunately did not make the deadline in time with the lawyers, so we couldn't put it on the album. Justin my little brother for life, so we will make that moment happen soon. Sorry to the fans that really wanted it to be on the album".

The standard edition of 11:11 was released on November 10, 2023, exclusively for digital download and streaming. On February 19, 2024, Brown officially announced the release of the deluxe edition of 11:11, stating that it would contain 11 additional tracks, with April 11, being a possible release date for it. On March 10, he confirmed the date, stating that the deluxe version of 11:11 will encompass 13 new songs, sharing its tracklist, and featured guests, including Bryson Tiller, Joyner Lucas, Tee Grizzley and Davido, hinting at Ayra Starr as a possible feature on the track "Won't Keep You Waiting". He then shared snippets of the songs "Bruce Lee", "Go Girlfriend" and "Freak" on his Instagram account, revealing the appearance of American rapper Lil Wayne on the track "Freak". 11:11 (Deluxe) was released digitally on April 11, 2024. On August 24, 2024, the deluxe edition of the album was released in vinyl format.

== Tour ==
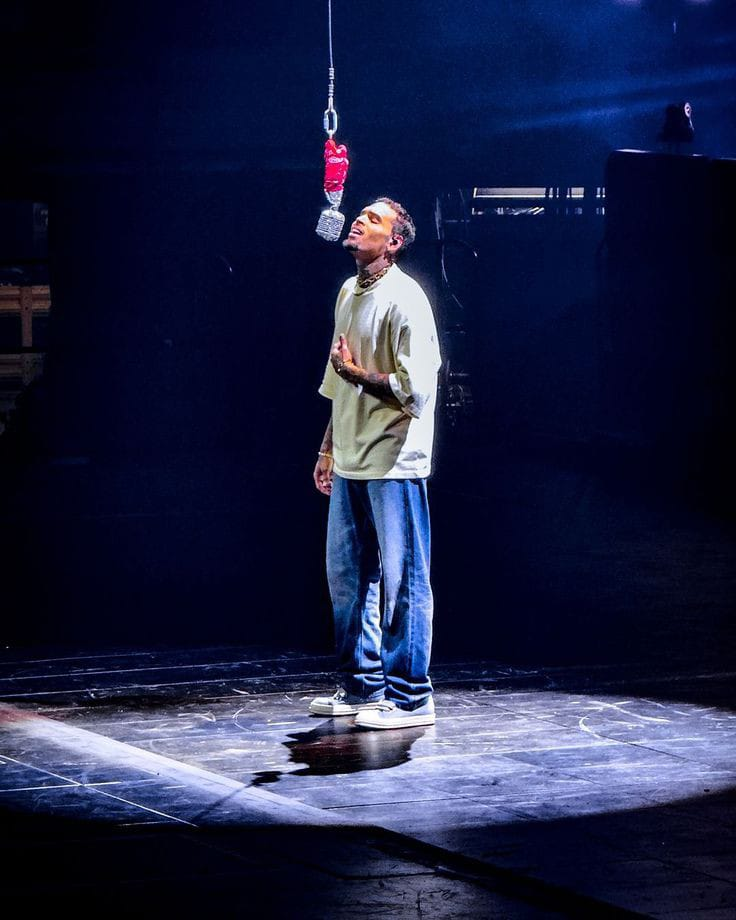
Brown performing "Residuals" during his 2024 "The 11:11 Tour"

The album was further promoted with Brown embarking on his 2024 tour named "The 11:11 Tour". The North American leg of the tour featured singers Ayra Starr, Muni Long and Maeta as supporting acts. The setlist included more than 40 songs from the singer's entire discography and featured a performance lasting over two hours. The set was divided into four acts: Fire, Water, Air, and Earth, with breaks from DJ Fresh.

The tour sold out all 36 dates across North America, drawing an attendance of 446,000 spectators and generating over $82 million in gross revenue. Additionally, on December 14 and 15, 2024, he held two concerts at Johannesburg's FNB Stadium, Africa's largest stadium, attracting a total attendance of 189,472 across both shows. This achievement made him the highest-selling artist in the stadium's history. On December 21 and 22, he ended the tour with two sold-out shows at the 55,000 capacity Allianz Parque Stadium in São Paulo, Brazil. His performances in South Africa and Brazil have collectively been referred to as the "Breezy Bowl" by his fans. Brown ultimately incorporated footage from "The 11:11 Tour" into his 2025 music video for the song "Residuals".

=== Critical reception ===
"The 11:11 Tour" garnered widespread acclaim from critics. Tallis Spencer, writing for HotNewHipHop, praised the concluding concert of the tour in Los Angeles: “The 11:11 tour's LA stop was undoubtedly a testament to Brown's artistry, longevity, charisma, and sheer talent. For those fortunate enough to attend, it was a night to remember.” Atlanta Voice said the singer “[delivered] an unforgettable performance (...) Throughout the concert, Chris Brown's stage presence was magnetic. His seamless dance moves and powerful vocals captivated the audience from start to finish.” News24 remarked that the Johannesburg concert on December 14 was “one of the best concerts we've had in South Africa in a long time (...) His set, which lasted over two hours, gave fans everything and more with excellent production, which included flying above the crowd when he sang "Wall To Wall" (...) The man also gave energetic dance breaks, giving his fans some of the iconic choreography they have seen in his music videos.” Hype magazine also expressed a largely positive review of the concert held on December 14, stating: “One of the greatest performers of this generation, Chris Brown proved his legendary status yet again. (...) His Chris Brown Live in Johannesburg show wasn't just the best event of 2024—it might be one of the most memorable in the past five years”.

=== South African controversy ===
Brown's South African concerts also sparked controversies as Women for Change, a South African feminist nonprofit, started a petition to block Brown's performances, due to his 2009 domestic violence scandal. The organization presented the petition, which received over 50,000 signatures, to the country's Departments of Home Affairs and of Sports, Arts and Culture, asking that Brown be denied a visa. Brown has addressed the protest by writing, “Can't wait to come,” followed by a heart emoji, under one of the organization's Instagram posts. Mamokgethi Phakeng, a former vice-chancellor of the University of Cape Town, publicly expressed her support for the event by announcing her intention to attend the show: “I respect the organization and its mission, but I think it is unfortunate that they chose to target people's legal choices rather than focus on promoting awareness in a way that builds rather than divides.” Following the concerts, the MMC for South African Economic Development, Nomoya Mnisi, praised the events for generating a significant economic boost for Johannesburg by driving tourism, creating jobs, and stimulating local businesses, contributing an estimated R900 million (US$49,375,417) to Gauteng’s visitor economy: “We are proud to have hosted an event of this magnitude, which not only showcases Johannesburg as a global hub for arts and culture but also highlights our capacity to facilitate large-scale events that stimulate economic activity. The success of the Chris Brown concerts is a testament to the resilience and vibrancy of our local economy”.

== Critical reception ==
Professional ratings
Review scores
Source	Rating
AllMusic	3/5 stars

Kayla Sandiford of Renowned for Sound described 11:11 as "palatable", praising Brown's vocal performances, saying that he "does well to demonstrate his dynamic vocal quality", but criticized the record's length, stating "although Brown can be commended for this, there are moments that feel like 11:11 has gotten wrapped up in quantity over quality". TiVo Staff of AllMusic found the record to be "more concise and a little more romantic" compared to his previous album Breezy. HipHopDX called 11:11 "his best album in almost a decade".

Different publications, including Billboard, Rated R&B, Yardbarker and HotNewHipHop put 11:11 among the best R&B albums of 2023. Billboard's staff wrote that the singer "remains a formidable draw in his 18th year in the music industry. His 11th album, 11:11, proves as much". Hayley Hynes of HotNewHipHop reviewing the album noted that Brown "seems more worried about impressing himself than critics". Mya Singleton writing for Yardbarker stated that "the formulas Brown uses in his music continue to work in his favor, and he's showing no signs of slowing down". Rated R&B said that with 11:11 the singer "continued to add stones to his jeweled, fan-dubbed crown". The following year Billboard also put 11:11 (Deluxe) as the tenth best R&B album of 2024: “the prolific Brown gifted fans with 13 more tracks for this cohesive, Grammy-nominated deluxe package, which showcases his still-formidable vocal agility and versatility”.

=== Awards and nominations ===
11:11 earned four nominations at the Grammy Awards: at the 66th Annual Grammy Awards, "Summer Too Hot" earned a nomination for Best R&B Performance, while at the 67th Annual Grammy Awards, 11:11 (Deluxe) earned a nomination for Best R&B Album, "Residuals" earned a nomination for Best R&B Performance, and "Sensational" earned a nomination for Best African Music Performance. 11:11 (Deluxe) won Best R&B Album, marking this as Chris Brown's second win in the category and his second win overall, with his first being for his 2011 album, F.A.M.E.. With this win, Chris Brown tied TLC, D'Angelo, and Robert Glasper for the second-most wins in this category.

11:11 won Top R&B Album at the 2024 Billboard Music Awards, while Chris Brown was nominated for Top R&B Touring Artist. At the 2024 BET Awards, 11:11 was nominated for Album of the Year, "Sensational" was nominated for Viewer's Choice, and Chris Brown was nominated for Best Male R&B/Pop Artist. At the 2025 iHeartRadio Music Awards, the singer earned two nominations: R&B Artist of the Year and "Sensational" for R&B Song of the Year. "Sensational" was also nominated for Best Afrobeats at the 2024 MTV Video Music Awards. At the 56th NAACP Image Awards, Chris Brown received three accolades: Outstanding Male Artist, Outstanding International Song for "Hmmm," and Outstanding Soul/R&B Song for "Residuals."

Awards and nominations for 11:11
Year	Ceremony	Category	Result	Ref.
2024	BET Awards	Album of the Year	Nominated	
2024	Billboard Music Awards	Top R&B Album	Won	
2025	Grammy Awards	Best R&B Album	Won	
2025	BET Awards	Album of the Year	Nominated	

== Commercial performance ==
In the United States, 11:11 debuted at number nine on the US Billboard 200 with 45,000 album-equivalent units, which included 6,000 pure album sales in its first week, making it his 12th consecutive top-ten album in the country. The album also accumulated 50.97 million on-demand audio streams in the United States for its track list of 22 songs.

== Track listing ==
11:11 disc 1 track listing
No.	Title	Writer(s)	Producer(s)	Length
1.	"Angel Numbers / Ten Toes"	Chris Brown; Christopher Dotson; Jamal Gaines; Ethan Hayes; Lance Hunter; Leon Krol; Ebby Marango; Juan Ramon Luis Mellan; Brian Mitchell; Matthias Ringleb; Gabriel Roland; Troy Taylor; Christian Ward; Leon Youngblood	Haze; Hitmaka; RoccStar; Roland; T. Taylor; Teezio^{[v]}	5:06
2.	"Sensational" (featuring Davido and Lojay)	Brown; David Adeleke; Omari Akinlolu; Kinsean Anderson; Steve Chokpelle; Philip Constable; Boubacar Diallo; Duwayne Mills; Ikechukwu Nnaemeka; Lekan Osifeso Jr.; Olalekan Taiwo	DJ Hardwerk; Krazytunez^{[a]}; Ragee^{[a]}; XQ^{[a]}; Teezio^{[v]}	3:51
3.	"Press Me"	Brown; Dotson; Patrizio Pigliapoco; Derelle Rideout; Peter Ring; Andre Robertson; Ward	Hitmaka; Aliby; Bizness Boi; Rideout; Teezio^{[v]}	2:07
4.	"That's on You" (featuring Future)	Brown; Miles Barker; Emmanuel Bekele; J. Gaines; John-Francis Mbata; Cameron Murphy; Woodlair Nosy; Harris Sameer; Nayvadius Wilburn	Emman; Fecony; Its2ezzy; Murphykid; Teezio^{[v]}	4:23
5.	"Feel Something"	Brown; Marcus Berry; Keith Ingram; Kesington Kross; Toney Martinez; Roland; L. Youngblood	RoccStar; Roland; Prince Youngblood; Teezio^{[v]}	3:12
6.	"Best Ever" (featuring Maeta)	Brown; Mikhail Beltran; Sabrina Claudio	Beltran; Teezio^{[v]}	2:32
7.	"No One Else" (featuring Fridayy)	Brown; Eric Bellinger; Edgar Cutino; Francis Leblanc; Justin Kent; Rodney Montreal; Cordaryl Scribner; Chris Washington	Fortune; Fridayy; Gabe; RoccStar^{[a]}; Teezio^{[v]}	3:43
8.	"Shooter"	Brown; Naledi Aphiwe; Berry; Ingram; Tay Iwar; Kross; P. Pigliapoco; Stefano Pigliapoco; Kifano Reque; Stefano; L. Youngblood	RoccStar; Teezio^{[p]}; Leandro Hidalgo; Ingram; Kifa; S. Pigliapoco	3:30
9.	"Nightmares" (featuring Byron Messia)	Brown; Haile Alexander; Olagundoye Malcolm; Byron Messia; Ryan Press	Brown; Chopstix	2:30
10.	"Very Special"	Brown; Jovaughn Mixon; Micky Munday; Peace Oredope; Roland; Elliott Trent; L. Youngblood	RoccStar; Roland; Jovaughn J Mix; P.Priime; Trent; Munday^{[a]}; Teezio^{[v]}	3:33
11.	"Messed Up"	Brown; Berry; Diallo; Ingram; T. Martinez; Roland; L. Youngblood; Shyre Youngblood	RoccStar; T. Martinez; Roland; Teezio^{[v]}	2:53
Total length:				37:20

11:11 disc 2 track listing
No.	Title	Writer(s)	Producer(s)	Length
12.	"Midnight Freak"	Brown; Christopher Bivins; Yusuf El; Robertson; Trent	Bizness Boi; Trent; Buddafly Wolf; Ye Ali; Teezio^{[v]}	2:43
13.	"Moonlight"	Brown; Yumi Arai; Jesse Blocker III; J. Gaines; Donye'a Goodin; Tristan Rice; Charles Stephens III	Chizzy; Teezio^{[v]}	3:11
14.	"Bouncing / G5"	Brown; Trent; Nandish Patel	Trent; Nandish; Teezio^{[v]}	2:56
15.	"Make Up Your Mind"	Brown; Diego Avendano; Nathan DiRocco; J. Gaines; Ciaran Mullan; Luke Niedzeilski; Naveen Pabbi; Martin Pitt; Philipp Riebenstahl	Diego Ave; DJ Fricktion; Pitt Tha Kid; ThxLuke; Teezio^{[v]}	2:34
16.	"Stutter"	Brown; Dotson; Ron E.; Rashad Johnson; Aaron Rogers; Nigel Sparkes; Ward	Hitmaka; The Breed; Teezio^{[v]}	2:51
17.	"Need a Friend"	Brown; Floyd Bentley; Deshaun L. Cannon; Gregory Lopez; Nosy; Andre Proctor; Antonio Stith; Ernest Taylor; Bobby Turner; Jirou Williams	Cannon; SprngBrk; Street; Teezio^{[v]}	3:12
18.	"Summer Too Hot"	Brown; Nasri Atweh; Berry; Ingram; T. Martinez; Roland; Myjah Veira; L. Youngblood	RoccStar; Roland; T. Martinez^{[a]}; Teezio^{[v]}	3:08
19.	"Feelings Don't Lie"	Brown; Shane Murphy; Trent	Trent; Teezio^{[v]}	2:18
20.	"Red Flags"	Brown; Berry; Ingram; Trey Lawson; Roland; T. Martinez; Veira; L. Youngblood	RoccStar; Roland; Prince Youngblood; Teezio^{[v]}	2:48
21.	"Closer"	Brown; Avendano; Nathan DiRocco; J. Gaines; Pabbi; Cody Tarpley; Vincent van den Ende	Diego Ave; DJ Fricktion; Avedon; Cody; Teezio^{[v]}	2:11
22.	"Views"	Brown; Daniel Breland; Stanley Cunningham; John Eley; J. Gaines; Sterling Gittens Jr.; Rice; William Gittens	S. Gittens; Teezio^{[v]}	2:30
Total length:				30:12

11:11 (Deluxe) — Deluxe edition additional tracks
No.	Title	Writer(s)	Producer(s)	Length
1.	"Bruce Lee"	Brown; Vassal Benford; Paul Bennett; Roberto Diaz; Matthew Garcia; Mariah Martinez; P. Pigliapoco; Dana Portalatin; Jamal Rashid; Domenico Randazzo	Teezio^{[p]}; BaeBae; Mally Mall; YX	2:55
2.	"Go Girlfriend"	Brown; Bentley; J. Gaines; Darius Logan; Dominique Logan	Blaq Tuxedo; Teezio^{[v]}	2:55
3.	"No Interruptions"	Brown; Brittany Barber; Kevin Ekofo; Aaron Lamont; Eric Mackey; Rodney Montreal Jr.; Francis Leblanc; Robertson	Bizness Boi; Fortune; Fridayy; Kofo; Teezio^{[v]}	2:39
4.	"Run Away" (featuring Bryson Tiller)	Brown; Johann Deterville; Matthew Samuels; Bryson Tiller	Boi-1da; YogiTheProducer; Teezio^{[v]}	3:27
5.	"Delusional"	Brown; Benford; Bennett; Giovani Borges-Figueroa; Diaz; Garcia; P. Pigliapoco; Portalatin; Randazzo; Rashid	Mally Mall; YX; Teezio^{[v]}	3:37
6.	"Freak" (featuring Joyner Lucas, Lil Wayne, and Tee Grizzley)	Brown; Dwayne Carter; Robert Cleveland; Tee Grizzley; Torhi Harper; Cornell Haynes; Ali Jones; Joe Kent; Gary Lucas; Leo Son; Terry Wallace Jr.; Mark Williams	ADHD Productions; Leo Son; Teezio^{[v]}	4:07
7.	"Won't Keep You Waiting" (featuring Mario)	Brown; Olufunmibi Awoshiley; Mario Barrett; Emmanuel Boateng; Karim Esmail; J. Gaines; Lance Hunter; Guylaire Leon Jr.; Sebastian Lopez; Samm Niingungo; Elijah Ross; Elzie Ross III; Dimitry Skeete; Yonatan Watts	1Mind; Sam-E Lee Jones; Kvrim; Mosadi; Ross; Tank God; Teezio^{[v]}	3:17
8.	"Hmmm" (featuring Davido)	Brown; David Adedeji Adeleke; Bobo Ajudua; Jessy Oliver; Abejide Oluwatimillehin	Young Alpha; Tiwany^{[a]}; Teezio^{[v]}	2:56
9.	"Afterlife"	Brown; Louis Bell; Michael Jackson; P. Pigliapoco; Jawan Shelton	BeazyTimes; Bell; Teezio^{[v]}	3:15
10.	"Sex So Good"	Brown; William Gaines; Christopher McDade; Jabreh Shaw; T. Taylor; J. Williams	T. Taylor; WillOnnaBeat; Xris Keys; Teezio^{[v]}	3:30
11.	"My Slime"	Brown; Bivins; El; Robertson; T. Taylor; Tre'Von Waters	Bizness Boi; Buddafly Wolf; Teezio^{[v]}	2:44
12.	"Sweet Lullaby"	Brown; Cedric de Saint-Rome; J. Gaines; Muhssiah Lott; Anthony Rivera; Malik Sanders	HouseFly; Malik Ninety Five; Mizzy; Teezio^{[v]}	3:43
13.	"Residuals"	Brown; Bentley; J. Gaines; Lorenzo Gaines; Jeremiah Green; Darius Logan; Dominique Logan; Dewain Whitmore	Blaq Tuxedo; Hudson; Teezio^{[v]}	3:35
Total length:				1:50:00

=== Sample credits ===
- "Press Me" contains a sample from "Baby I'm Back" as performed by Baby Bash featuring Akon.
- "Moonlight" contains a sample of "Sky Restaurant", written by Yumi Arai and Kunihiko Murai, and performed by Hi-Fi Set.
- "Shooter" contains a sample of South African singer, Naledi Aphiwe singing.
- "Freak" contains a sample from "Air Force Ones" as performed by Nelly featuring St. Lunatics.
- "Afterlife" contains a sample from "Leave Me Alone" as performed by Michael Jackson.

== Personnel ==
Credits are adapted from Tidal.

- Chris Brown – vocals
- Patrizio "Teezio" Pigliapoco – mixing
- Jenso Plymouth – engineering
- Ignacio Portales – engineering assistance
- Mike Tucci – mastering (1–17, 19–22)
- Federico Giordano – Immersive Mixer (1, 3–8, 10–17, 19–22)
- Ben "Bengineer" Chang – engineering (5, 20)
- Rafe Noonan – vocal engineering (6)
- Dale Becker – mastering (18)
- Naledi Aphiwe – vocals (8)
- BlckAtom – guitar (13)
- Katie Harvey – engineering assistance (18)
- Noah McCorkle – engineering assistance (18)

=== Deluxe edition ===
- Chris Brown – vocals
- Patricio "Teezio" Pigliapoco – mixing (all tracks), engineering (6, 9, 13)
- Jenso Plymouth – engineering (1–5, 7, 8, 10–12)
- Ben "Bengineer" Chang – engineering (3)
- Ignacio Portales – engineering assistance
- Federico Giordano – engineering assistance
- Mike Tucci – mastering
- Domenico Randazzo – guitar (1, 5); piano, synthesizer (5)
- Paul Bennett – programming (1, 5)
- YX – background vocals (1, 5)
- Boi-1da – programming (4)
- YogiTheProducer – programming (4)
- Leo Son – vocal engineering (6)
- Manny Galvez – vocal engineering (6)
- Jabreh Shaw – background vocals (10)
- Tre'Von Waters – accordion (11)
- Aaron Strickland – guitar (12)
- Blaq Tuxedo – programming (13)
- Eric Hudson – programming (13)
- Taylor Crommie – engineering (13)

== Charts ==
=== Weekly charts ===
Weekly chart performance for 11:11
Chart (2023–2024)	Peak position
Australian Albums (ARIA)	16
Australian Hip Hop/R&B Albums (ARIA)	3
Austrian Albums (Ö3 Austria)	52
Belgian Albums (Ultratop Flanders)	47
Belgian Albums (Ultratop Wallonia)	81
Canadian Albums (Billboard)	34
Danish Albums (Hitlisten)	13
Dutch Albums (Album Top 100)	6
French Albums (SNEP)	49
German Albums (Offizielle Top 100)	38
Irish Albums (Official Charts)	41
Japanese Download Albums (Billboard Japan)	86
New Zealand Albums (RMNZ)	2
Nigerian Albums (TurnTable)	19
Norwegian Albums (VG-lista)	7
Portuguese Albums (AFP)	92
Swiss Albums (Schweizer Hitparade)	9
UK Albums (Official Charts)	11
UK R&B Albums (Official Charts)	3
US Billboard 200	9
US Top R&B/Hip-Hop Albums (Billboard)	2

=== Year-end charts ===
2024 year-end chart performance for 11:11
Chart (2024)	Position
Australian Hip Hop/R&B Albums (ARIA)	41
Dutch Albums (Album Top 100)	70
New Zealand Albums (RMNZ)	37
US Billboard 200	90
US Top R&B/Hip-Hop Albums (Billboard)	37

2025 year-end chart performance for 11:11
Chart (2025)	Position
US Top R&B/Hip-Hop Albums (Billboard)	99

== Certifications ==
Certifications for 11:11
Region	Certification	Certified units/sales
Denmark (IFPI Danmark)	Gold	10,000^{‡}
New Zealand (RMNZ) Deluxe version	Platinum	15,000^{‡}
United Kingdom (BPI)	Gold	100,000^{‡}
^{‡} Sales+streaming figures based on certification alone.

== Release history ==
Release dates and formats for 11:11
Region	Date	Label(s)	Edition(s)	Format(s)
Various	November 10, 2023	RCA; CBE	Standard	Digital download; streaming
Various	April 11, 2024	RCA; CBE	Deluxe	Digital download; streaming
Various	August 24, 2024	CBE	Deluxe	LP
