= Shiloh Dynasty =

American indie singer-songwriter (born 1993)

- Born: Ciara Nicole Simms; Maryland, U.S.
- Other names: Shiloh's Dynasty; Shiloh
- Years active: 2014-2016
- Musical career
- Genres: Alternative; indie
- Occupations: Singer; songwriter; guitarist
- Instruments: Vocals; guitar
- Years active: 2014–2017

YouTube information
- Channel: Shiloh Dynasty
- Years active: 2021–present
- Subscribers: 725 thousand
- Views: 140 million
- Last updated: August 08, 2026

Ciara Nicole Simms, known professionally as Shiloh Dynasty, is an American indie singer-songwriter known for her singles "Losing Interest", and "I'll Keep You Safe", both of which gained internet virality. She initially started posting snippets of her singing on Vine. As her singing on social media began to gain prominence, her singing was sampled by many SoundCloud and lofi producers.

Born and raised in Maryland, Simms began posting music independently in 2014. Simms stopped posting on her social media accounts by late 2016 expressing a desire to stay out of the public eye. In 2017, her vocals were featured on XXXTentacion's "Jocelyn Flores", produced by Potsu. The song went 8× Platinum in 2022 and peaked at No. 19 on the Billboard Hot 100 Singles Chart. XXXTentacion's 2017 album, 17 also features her on the tracks "Carry On", and "Everybody Dies in Their Nightmares".

== Career ==
Ciara Nicole Simms, a Maryland native, is professionally known as Shiloh Dynasty. She began her music career in March 2014 with the release of her song "Downtown" on SoundCloud. Shiloh rose to prominence by posting brief snippets on the social media platform Vine, where she would sing while playing guitar. Her singing also posted on Instagram, further grew her audience leading her to be noticed by many producers such as Timbaland. Her vocals began to be sampled on tracks made by SoundCloud and lofi producers by 2015. Her songs "Losing Interest" and "I'll Keep You Safe" were certified gold by the RIAA.

She was present on XXXTentacion's 2017 album, 17, and the song "Jocelyn Flores", which she is featured on, went 8× Platinum in 2022. Dynasty appeared on three songs on the album—"Jocelyn Flores", "Everybody Dies in Their Nightmares", and "Carry On"—the former of which peaked at number 19 on the Billboard Hot 100, along with the second song which peaked at number 42. During a Reddit AMA, producer John Cunningham—who worked closely with XXXTentacion—confirmed that Shiloh and XXXTentacion had met together in a studio in Los Angeles, California.

After September 13, 2016, Shiloh stopped posting to social media, leading to widespread speculation about her whereabouts. Rumors that she had died were debunked in 2019 by her former management. There is no current indication of her return to music as her management expressed her desire for privacy. Her vocals were used in many tracks, including Young Thug's "Climax" (2018), and Juice Wrld's "Run" (2019).

== Discography ==
=== Singles ===
List of singles
Title	Year	Peak chart positions	Certifications
Title	Year	WW	Certifications
"I'll Keep You Safe"	2015	–	RIAA: Gold
"Losing Interest"	2015	–	RIAA: Gold

- "Waiting"
- "Losing Interest"
- "Downtown"
- "Nicole's Garden"
- "Jocelyn Flores" (with XXXTentacion)
- "when i fall" (with Siiickbrain)
- "Carry On" (with XXXTentacion)
- "Everybody Dies in Their Nightmares" (with XXXTentacion)
- "Guardian angel" (with XXXTentacion)
- "I'm Sorry" (with Swell)
