= Sensational (song) =

Single by Chris Brown featuring Davido and Lojay

from the album 11:11
- Released: October 20, 2023
- Recorded: 2023
- Genre: Afrobeats
- Length: 3:51
- Label: RCA; CBE
- Songwriters: Chris Brown; Sean Kingston; David Adeleke; Lekan Osifeso Jnr.
- Producer: Phillip "DJ Hardwerk" Constable

Chris Brown singles chronology
"IDGAF" (2023)	"Sensational" (2023)	"Nightmares" (2023)

Music video
- "Sensational" on YouTube

"Sensational" is a song by American singer Chris Brown from his eleventh studio album 11:11. The song was released as the album's second single on October 20, 2023, under CBE. It features guest vocals from Nigerian singers Davido and Lojay.

The song was written by Chris Brown, Sean Kingston, Davido and Lojay, and produced by DJ Hardwerk. "Sensational" is an Afrobeats song, featuring romantic lyrical content. Critical reception towards the song was positive, with critics complimenting the artists' performances and its production. "Sensational" marked Davido and Lojay's first entry on the US Billboard Hot 100, and Brown's 117th. Its accompanying music video was released alongside the song, and was directed by videographer Child. The song won two NAACP Image Awards.

== Background and release ==
On October 13, 2023, Brown posted pictures of a then-upcoming music video on his Instagram account, teasing on the caption the release of "sensational new music". On October 16, four days before the song’s release, Brown unveiled it as the second single from 11:11, along with its title, featured artists and release date, posting a video on his Instagram account where he performs a choreography for it with his dancing crew.

Brown and Davido already worked on several songs together prior to "Sensational", including "Blow My Mind", "Lower Body", "Under the Influence", "Shopping Spree" and "Nobody Has to Know". The song also marks the second collaboration between Brown and Lojay, following the 2022 remix of the latter's single "Monalisa".

== Composition ==
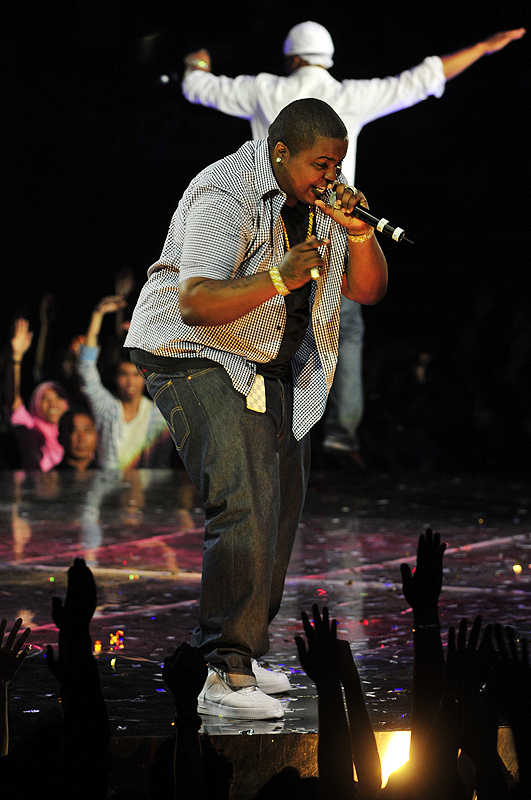
"Sensational" was co-written by Jamaican singer Sean Kingston.

"Sensational" is an Afrobeats song, produced by DJ Hardwerk, featuring guest appearances from Nigerian singers Davido and Lojay. The song was written by its performers alongside Jamaican singer Sean Kingston. "Sensational" features a "percussion-driven" production, and its "romantic" lyrical content contains "words of reassurance and affection to their beloved". Kayla Sandiford of Renowned for Sound described the song's composition as "jumpy lightheartedness". According to Revolt, the track is characterized by "Brown’s infectious harmonies and straight-to-the-point subject matter". HotNewHipHop noted that the song "features tropical vibes".

== Critical reception ==
The single received positive reviews. Essence highlighted the song, calling it an "impressive single". Billboard defined the track as a "sugary anthem", saying that "Sensational" is the type of song that "made [Chris Brown] R&B’s ultimate casanova". Mya Singleton of Yardbarker stated that the song features the singer "in pure Breezy form". Edward Bowser of Medium called "Sensational" the best Afrobeats track on 11:11. NotJustOk praised the artists' performances and DJ Hardwerk's production, calling the song "an auditory delight that fully lives up to its name, as it showcases the musical prowess and synergy of these three remarkable acts". P.M. News defined it a “truly remarkable” collaboration, stating that the featured artists on "Sensational" “deliver scorching verses that elevate the song to new heights.”

== Music video ==
On October 20, 2023, Brown released "Sensational" along with its music video, directed by videographer Child. Rap Radar described it as “elegant”, praising Brown's “striking dance moves”.

== Accolades ==
Accolades for "Sensational"
Year	Ceremony	Award	Result	Ref.
2024	NAACP Image Awards	Outstanding Duo, Group or Collaboration (Contemporary)	Won	
2024	NAACP Image Awards	Outstanding Music Video	Won	
2024	BET Awards	Viewer's Choice Award	Nominated	
2024	MTV Video Music Awards	Best Afrobeats	Nominated	
2025	Grammy Awards	Best African Music Performance	Nominated	

== Commercial performance ==
On January 30, 2024, "Sensational" debuted at number 96 on the US Billboard Hot 100, serving as Davido and Lojay's first entry on the chart, and Brown's 117th. On February 20, 2024, the single re-entered the Billboard Hot 100 at 94. On the chart dated March 16, 2024, "Sensational" topped Billboard’s Mainstream R&B/Hip-Hop Airplay chart, marking Brown's 19th number-one on that chart.

== Charts ==
=== Weekly charts ===
Weekly chart performance
Chart (2023–24)	Peak position
Netherlands (Single Tip)	7
New Zealand Hot Singles (RMNZ)	2
Nigeria (TurnTable Top 100)	12
South Africa (TOSAC)	17
Suriname (Nationale Top 40)	4
UK Singles (Official Charts)	45
UK Hip Hop/R&B (Official Charts)	22
US Billboard Hot 100	71
US Hot R&B/Hip-Hop Songs (Billboard)	24
US R&B/Hip-Hop Airplay (Billboard)	4
US Rhythmic Airplay (Billboard)	3
US World Digital Song Sales (Billboard)	2

=== Year-end charts ===
Annual chart rankings
Chart (2024)	Position
US Hot R&B/Hip-Hop Songs (Billboard)	61
US R&B/Hip-Hop Airplay (Billboard)	12
US Radio Songs (Billboard)	56
US Rhythmic (Billboard)	23

== Certifications ==
Certifications for "Sensational"
Region	Certification	Certified units/sales
New Zealand (RMNZ)	Gold	15,000^{‡}
Nigeria (TCSN)	Silver	25,000^{‡}
United Kingdom (BPI)	Silver	200,000^{‡}
^{‡} Sales+streaming figures based on certification alone.
