= Residuals (song) =

2024 single by Chris Brown

Single by Chris Brown

from the album 11:11 (Deluxe)
- Released: September 10, 2024
- Genre: R&B
- Length: 3:36
- Label: RCA; CBE
- Songwriters: Chris Brown; Dewain Whitmore Jr.; Floyd Bentley; Jeremiah Green; Jamal Gaines
- Producers: Blaq Tuxedo; Eric Hudson

Chris Brown singles chronology
"Lightning" (2024)	"Residuals" (2024)	"Mutt (Remix)" (2025)

Music video
- "Residuals" on YouTube

"Residuals" is a song by American singer Chris Brown, taken from the deluxe edition of his eleventh studio album, 11:11, released on April 11, 2024. The song was later serviced to rhythmic contemporary radio on September 10, 2024, as the album's fourth single.

Originally recorded during the sessions for Brown's tenth studio album Breezy, "Residuals" is an R&B ballad about the emotional complexity that arises after the end of a relationship. The song became the highest-charting single from the 11:11 album on the Billboard Hot 100, whilst topping Billboard’s Rhythmic Airplay chart, becoming Brown's fourteenth track to do so. "Residuals" was met with critical praise, and was nominated at the 67th Annual Grammy Awards for Best R&B Performance. The song's music video was released on January 23, 2025, and features footage from Brown's 2024 "The 11:11 Tour", while also following a storyline about a lost love. Several artists, including Tank, Shawn Stockman, Chloe Bailey, Mario, Jacob Latimore, Trevor Jackson, Sammie, and R. Kelly released their own remix versions of the song.

== Background ==
Producers Blaq Tuxedo talked about the making of the song: "“Residuals” was supposed to be on the Breezy album. That was the first song that kicked off the album. He records a lot of songs, so it kind of got buried. We ended up doing “Iffy.” We created that song the same week and he rode with that, which was a blessing. Fast forward, [“Residuals”] comes back around. We were playing it at a party and he called the next morning like, “Yo, I’m putting this on the album.” He wanted to put it on [Breezy], but it didn't fit the mood of that music, so the timing was right".

The song originally did not appear on the standard edition of Brown's album 11:11, being released on April 11, 2024, as the thirteenth track of the deluxe edition of the album. After "Residuals" charted on the Billboard Hot 100, it was serviced to rhythmic contemporary radio on September 10, 2024, as 11:11's fourth single.

== Composition ==
"Residuals" is an R&B ballad, produced by Blaq Tuxedo and Eric Hudson, where Brown expresses the lingering after-effects of breaking up with someone he thought he'd spend a lifetime with. Its lyrics feature faded memories between the singer and his past lover, while he expresses a sense of longing for her.

== Critical reception ==
"Residuals" has been praised by critics. Billboard lauded the track, commending Brown's "formidable" vocal performance. Rated R&B described "Residuals" as a "heartfelt song," while Vibe included it in their list of the top ten R&B songs of 2024, noting it as “a deeply reflective and emotionally charged song (...) Its minimalist beat and smooth rhythm complement the rawness of Breezy’s lyrics, allowing his vocal performance to take center stage.” Essence also recognized the track, featuring it among the best releases of the week.

== Music video ==
The song's accompanying music video was released on January 23, 2025, and was directed by Travis Colbert. The video incorporates footage from Brown's 2024 "The 11:11 Tour", including his sold-out stadium shows in South Africa and Brazil, featuring both onstage and behind-the-scenes moments. The video also features a storyline: it sees Brown singing the lyrics in the recording booth, an alley way, and while cruising in a fast car until he ultimately crashes out. The scenes lead to the ultimate one that features Brown singing into a hanging microphone, wrapped with a red bandana, in the center of what appears to be a celestial stadium in the afterlife. There, he sees the love of his life once more before she disappears forever.

== Live performances ==
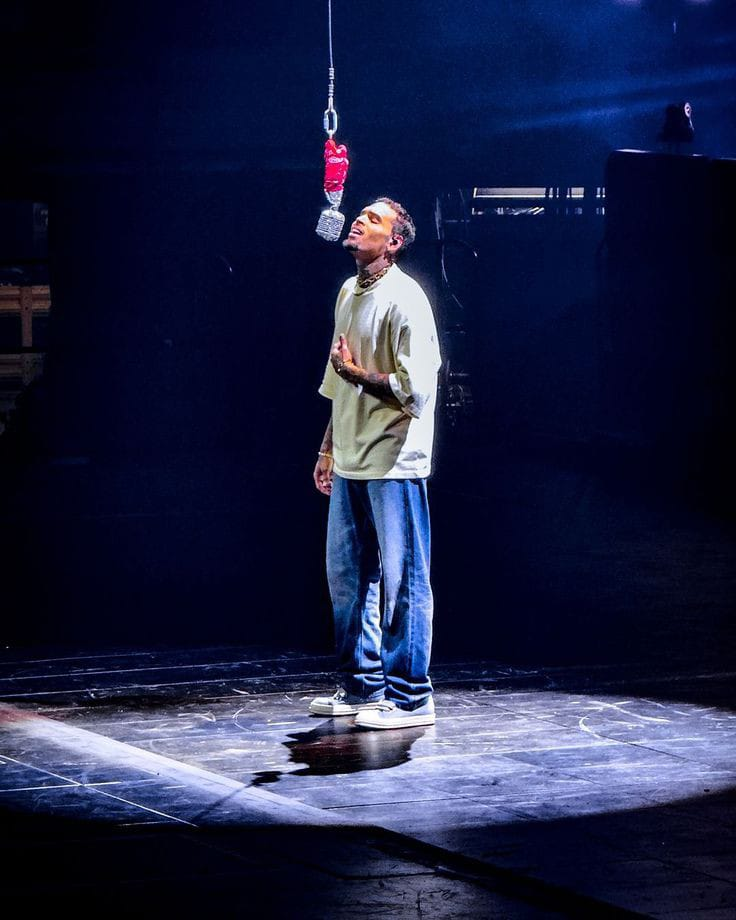
Brown performing the song during his 2024 "The 11:11 Tour"

The song was included on the set list of Brown's 2024 "The 11:11 Tour". Brown talked about performing "Residuals" in 2024, saying: "I'm thankful music saves me and allows me to express my true vulnerability and ability to be related to people's everyday situation, every regret, every amazing time, every sad experience and love lessons."

== Chart performance ==
Following the release of the deluxe edition of Brown's 11:11 album, the song debuted at number 15 on the Hot R&B Songs chart, on the chart dated April 24, 2024. During Brown's "The 11:11 Tour", the track rose to the top ten on Billboard's Hot R&B Songs chart, entering at number 9 on the chart dated July 16, 2024. Billboard wrote that the track "emerged as a fan-favorite on social media, with many clips shared from the hitmaker’s performances on his The 11:11 Tour", proving how "fan-led engagement can yield big radio successes". With "Residuals", Brown earned his 51st top-10 hit on the Hot R&B Songs chart, being three songs away from tying Drake's record for the most top 10s on the chart (54). On the chart dated July 23, 2024, the song debuted on the Hot R&B/Hip-Hop Songs chart at number 41. "Residuals" debuted at number 97 on the Billboard Hot 100 dated August 24, marking his 118th entry.

On the chart dated November 16, 2024, "Residuals" topped Billboard’s Rhythmic Airplay chart. Being his 14th track to do so, Chris Brown became the third artist with the most number 1s on the Rhythmic Airplay chart, behind Drake and Rihanna. On the chart dated February 8, 2025, "Residuals" rose to number 40 on the Billboard Hot 100. With "Residuals", Chris Brown reached 100 weeks at No. 1 on the R&B/Hip-Hop Airplay Chart. The track became his 11th number one on this audience-based list.

== Awards and nominations ==
"Residuals" was nominated for Best R&B Performance at the 67th Annual Grammy Awards and won for Outstanding Soul/R&B Song at the 56th NAACP Image Awards.

== Other versions ==
In February and March 2025, Tank used the R&B Money podcast to challenge other singers to sing their own version of "Residuals", starting with Tank's own reworking of it. Singers who responded to the challenge include Shawn Stockman of Boyz II Men, Chloe Bailey, Mishon, Trevor Jackson, Jacob Latimore and Mario. Producer R. Kelly, serving time for racketeering and sex crimes, sang his own version over the phone from prison.

Brown reacted positively to the various interpretations of his song, saying: "I just wanna take this time to show my thanks and love for everyone who is doing the 'Residuals' challenge, I'm glad it’s giving people the opportunity to be seen and heard. Real R&B isn’t dead, and I thank you for showing me that."

== Charts ==
=== Weekly charts ===
Weekly chart performance for "Residuals"
Chart (2024–2025)	Peak position
New Zealand Hot Singles (RMNZ)	15
Nigeria (TurnTable Top 100)	66
South Africa Streaming (TOSAC)	3
Suriname (Nationale Top 40)	14
US Billboard Hot 100	40
US Hot R&B/Hip-Hop Songs (Billboard)	10
US Pop Airplay (Billboard)	31
US R&B/Hip-Hop Airplay (Billboard)	1
US Rhythmic Airplay (Billboard)	1

=== Year-end charts ===
2024 year-end chart performance for "Residuals"
Chart (2024)	Position
US Hot R&B/Hip-Hop Songs (Billboard)	81

2025 year-end chart performance for "Residuals"
Chart (2025)	Position
US Billboard Hot 100	63
US Hot R&B/Hip-Hop Songs (Billboard)	19
US Hot R&B/Hip-Hop Airplay (Billboard)	1
US Rhythmic (Billboard)	28
US Adult R&B Songs (Billboard)	1

== Certifications ==
Certifications for "Residuals"
Region	Certification	Certified units/sales
New Zealand (RMNZ)	Platinum	30,000^{‡}
United Kingdom (BPI)	Silver	200,000^{‡}
United States (RIAA)	Platinum	1,000,000^{‡}
^{‡} Sales+streaming figures based on certification alone.
