= Depression & Obsession =

2017 song by XXXTentacion

Song by XXXTentacion

from the album 17
- Released: August 25, 2017
- Genre: Contemporary folk music; sentimental ballad
- Length: 2:24
- Label: Bad Vibes Forever; Empire
- Songwriter: Jahseh Onfroy
- Producer: XXXTentacion

"Depression & Obsession" is a song written, produced, and performed by American rapper and singer XXXTentacion from his debut studio album, 17, released on August 25, 2017 through Empire Distribution. The song is also included on XXXTentacion’s only compilation album, Look at Me: The Album, released on June 10, 2022, where it appears as the sixteenth track on the project.

Depression & Obsession was ranked 29th on XXL’s list of “The 30 Best XXXTentacion Songs, Ranked.”

== Background ==
The song was originally intended to appear on the unreleased and unfinished 2016 version of Bad Vibes Forever, featuring singers Abra and Nicole Dollanganger, as shown on a tracklist for the scrapped project posted on Instagram in 2016, but the project was ultimately never completed.

The song features a minimal arrangement built around soft strings. XXL described the track as a laid-back song in which XXXTentacion reflects on toxic romance and appears comfortable expressing emotional pain.

== Personnel ==
Credits adapted from Apple Music.

- XXXTentacion – artist, songwriter, producer, recording engineer
- Stefan Tisminezky – acoustic guitar

== Charts ==
Chart (2017)	Peak position
Canada Hot 100 (Billboard)	93
US Billboard Hot 100	91
US Hot R&B/Hip-Hop Songs (Billboard)	46

== Certifications ==
Region	Certification	Certified units/sales
New Zealand (RMNZ)	Platinum	30,000^{‡}
United Kingdom (BPI)	Silver	200,000^{‡}
^{‡} Sales+streaming figures based on certification alone.

== Koe Wetzel version ==
"Depression & Obsession"

Song by Koe Wetzel

from the album 9 Lives
- Released: July 19, 2024
- Recorded: 2024
- Genre: Country; country rock; grunge
- Length: 2:29
- Label: Columbia
- Songwriter: Jahseh Onfroy
- Producers: Koe Wetzel; Josh Serrato

In 2024, American singer-songwriter Koe Wetzel released a cover of XXXTentacion’s “Depression & Obsession” for his sixth studio album 9 Lives, released on July 19, 2024, through Columbia Records. The song appears as the album’s fourteenth track. A music video for the song was released the same day and was directed by Motion Theory Media.

=== Critical reception ===
Forbes described Koe Wetzel's cover as "haunting" and praised his "wide-ranging" ability as a performer.

=== Personnel ===
Credits adapted from Apple Music

- Koe Wetzel – artist, acoustic guitar, producer
- Jahseh Onfroy – songwriter
- Josh Serrato – electric guitar, keyboards, producer, recording engineer
- Ryan Hewitt – mixing engineer
- Ted Jensen – mastering engineer
