= Koen Heldens =

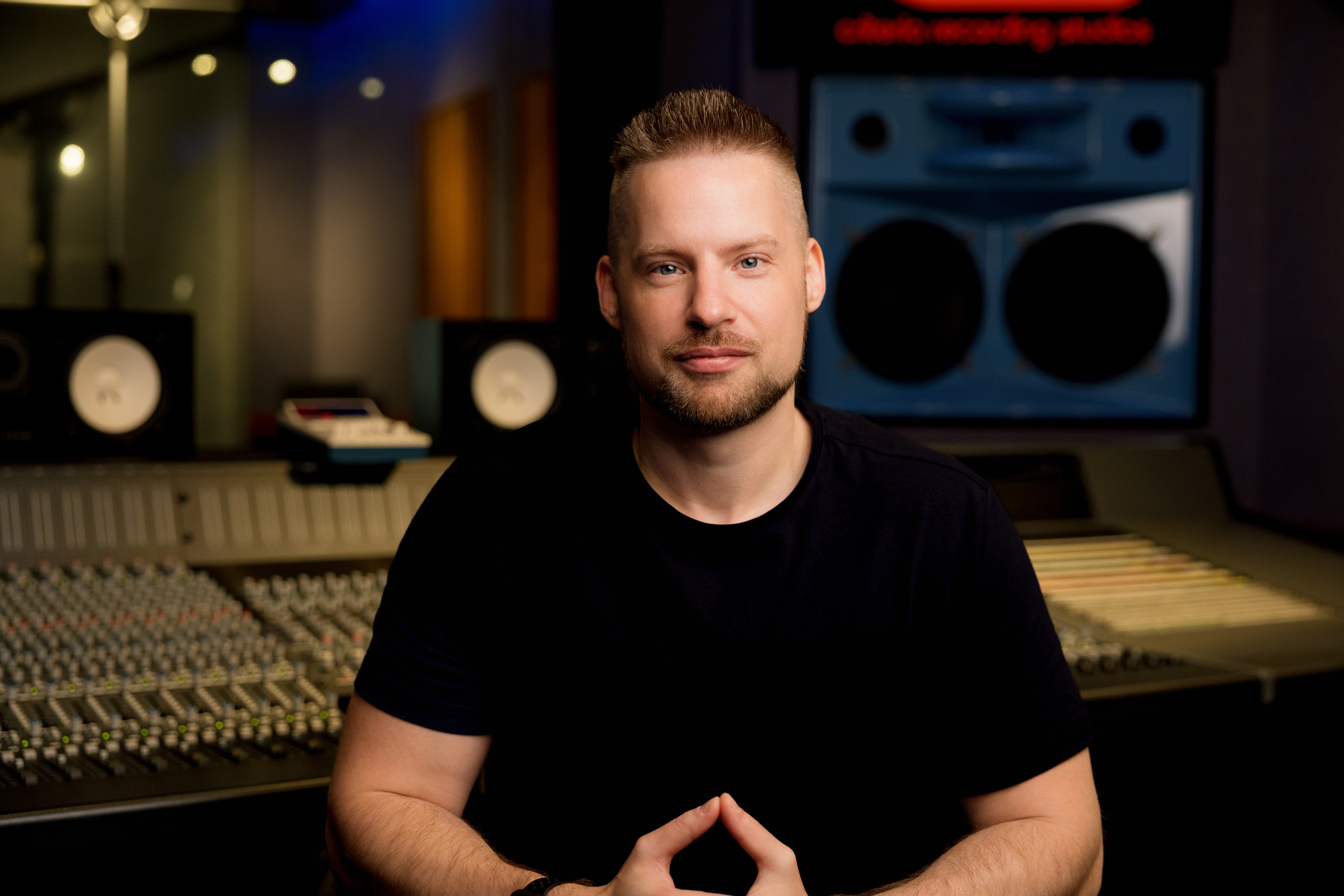
- Mixing Engineer Koen Heldens at Criteria Recording Studios

Background information
- Origin: Venray, Netherlands
- Genres: Hip hop; R&B; Latin
- Occupations: Mixing engineer, producer
- Years active: 2003–present
- Website: www.mixedbykoenheldens.com

Koen Heldens is a Dutch mixing engineer. He is credited on multiple multi-platinum songs and has received American Music Award and Billboard Music Awards alongside a Grammy Award nomination.

== Early life and education ==
Originally from the Netherlands, Heldens began music school at the age of 6, attended the Venray School of Music, and accelerated through his teenage years as a music producer and classically trained pianist.

He moved to Los Angeles at 19 to start a career in the music business.

== Career ==
Heldens started his career in 2003, and rose to prominence in 2017 when he started working with the late XXXTentacion, with whom he earned a Guinness World Record for most streamed song in a single day for the Billboard Hot 100 #1 single "Sad!"

Heldens has worked with Beyoncé, Lil Wayne, Joe Budden, Missy Elliott, Fat Joe, Rihanna, J-Lo, Run DMC, Dr. Dre, Dreezy, En Vogue, Kid Ink, Lecrae, Sizzla, Timbaland, TLC's T-Boz, and Wiz Khalifa.

Heldens has been nominated for a Grammy Award, and has won an American Music Award and a Billboard Music Award.

He is often called upon to teach and speak on panels for music companies such as the National Association for Music Merchandisers (NAMM) and Avid's Pro-Tools. He also reviews plugins and new technologies for "quality and accuracy" for various companies.

== Discography highlights ==
=== Singles mixed ===
List of singles as mixer, with selected chart positions and certifications, showing year released, performing artists and album name
Title	Year	Peak chart positions										Certifications	Album
Title	Year	US	US R&B	US Rap	ARG	CAN	FRA	UK	NZ	SWE	GER	Certifications	Album
"Jocelyn Flores" XXXTentacion	2017	19	—	10	—	14	38	39	4	7	—	United States (RIAA): 8× Platinum; Denmark (IFPI Denmark): 2× Platinum; France (SEP): (10× Platinum) Diamond; Germany (BVMI): Platinum; Italy (FIMI): 2× Platinum; New Zealand (RIANZ): 6× Platinum; Spain (PROMUSICAE): Platinum; United Kingdom (BPI): 2× Platinum; Greece (IFPI Greece): Platinum	17
"A Ghetto Christmas Carol" XXXTentacion	2017	—	—	—	—	—	—	—	—	—	—	United States (RIAA): Platinum	A Ghetto Christmas Carol EP
"Fuck Love (ft. Trippie Redd)" XXXTentacion	2018	28	3	-	-	31	70	89	19	35	-	United States (RIAA): 11× Platinum); Denmark (IFPI Denmark): Platinum; France (SEP): Diamond; Italy (FIMI): Platinum; New Zealand (RIANZ): 3× Platinum; Spain (PROMUSICAE): Platinum; United Kingdom (BPI): Platinum	17
"Sad!" XXXTentacion	2018	1	1	1	-	2	27	5	3	3	12	United States (RIAA): Diamond (10× Platinum); Australia (ARIA): 5× Platinum; Belgium (BEA): 2× Platinum; Brazil (Pro-Música Brasil): 3x Diamond; Canada (Music Canada): 3× Platinum; Denmark (IFPI Denmark): 2× Platinum; France (SEP): Diamond (10× Platinum); Germany (BVMI): Platinum; Italy (FIMI): 2× Platinum; Mexico (AMPROFON): Platinum; Netherlands (NVPI): 2× Platinum; New Zealand (RIANZ): 5× Platinum; Norway (IFPI Norway): 2× Platinum; Portugal (AFP): 3× Platinum; Poland (ZPAV): 3× Platinum; Spain (PROMUSICAE): Platinum; United Kingdom (BPI): 2× Platinum; Greece (IFPI Greece): Platinum; Sweden (GLF): 2× Platinum	?
"Arms Around You (ft. Swae Lee & Maluma)" XXXTentacion & Lil Pump	2018	28	2	-	14	13	25	14	15	8	16	United States (RIAA): Platinum; Australia (ARIA): Platinum; Denmark (IFPI Denmark): Gold; France (SEP): Platinum; Germany (BVMI: Gold; Italy (FIMI): Platinum; New Zealand (RIANZ): Platinum; Poland (ZPAV): Gold; Portugal (AFP): Platinum; Spain (PROMUSICAE): Gold; United Kingdom (BPI): Gold	non-album single
"Reach 4 Me" En Vogue	2018	—	—	—	—	—	—	—	—	—	—		Electric Café (En Vogue album)
"Porsches In The Rain" YBN (collective)	2018	—	—	—	—	—	—	—	—	—	—		YBN: The Mixtape
"Think Twice (ft. Lil Skies)" YBN (collective)	2018	—	—	—	—	—	—	—	—	—	—		YBN: The Mixtape
"Royalty (XXXTentacion song) (ft. Ky-Mani Marley, Stefflon Don & Vybz Kartel)" XXXTentacion	2019	—	—	—	—	—	—	—	—	—	—		Bad Vibes Forever
"How You Feel? (ft. Danny Towers, Lil Yachty & Ski Mask the Slump God)" DJ Scheme	2020	—	—	—	—	—	—	—	—	—	—	United States (RIAA): Gold	Family
"Breakshit" Jasiah	2020	—	—	—	—	—	—	—	—	—	—	United States (RIAA): Gold	WAR
"Angst" Apache 207	2021	—	—	—	—	—	—	—	—	—	1	Australia (ARIA): Gold; Germany (BVMI): Gold	non-album single
"Tu Nicht So" Badmómzjay	2021	—	—	—	—	—	—	—	—	—	10		Badmómz.
"Strip (Lena song)" Lena Meyer-Landrut	2021	—	—	—	—	—	—	—	—	—	70		Loyal to Myself
"Rosenkrieg" Loredana Zefi & Mozzik	2021	—	—	—	—	—	—	—	—	—	1		No Rich Parents
"Oh, Digga" Loredana Zefi & Mozzik	2021	—	—	—	—	—	—	—	—	—	27		No Rich Parents
"Nese Don" Loredana Zefi & Mozzik	2021	—	—	—	—	—	—	—	—	—	10		No Rich Parents
"Mit Mir" Loredana Zefi & Mozzik	2021	—	—	—	—	—	—	—	—	—	12		No Rich Parents
"2Sad2Disco" Apache 207	2021	—	—	—	—	—	—	—	—	—	7		2Sad2Disco
"Vodka" Apache 207	2021	—	—	—	—	—	—	—	—	—	1	Australia (ARIA): Gold	2Sad2Disco
"Thunfisch & Weinbrand" Apache 207	2021	—	—	—	—	—	—	—	—	—	13		2Sad2Disco
"Sport" Apache 207	2021	—	—	—	—	—	—	—	—	—	10	Germany (BVMI): Gold	2Sad2Disco
"Feuer" Monet 192	2021	—	—	—	—	—	—	—	—	—	70		Kinder der Sonne
"Vorbei" Monet 192	2021	—	—	—	—	—	—	—	—	—	53		Kinder der Sonne
"Sterne" Monet192	2021	—	—	—	—	—	—	—	—	—	70		Kinder der Sonne
"Narben" Monet192	2021	—	—	—	—	—	—	—	—	—	78		Kinder der Sonne
"Bein Chula" Khea	2021	—	—	—	69	—	—	—	—	—	—		non-album single
"FVCKBOI (ft. Lenny Tavárez)" Khea	2021	—	—	—	—	—	—	—	—	—	—		non-album single
"Outro (ft. FMK)" Khea	2021	—	—	—	—	—	—	—	—	—	—		non-album single
"Pa Co (ft. Lit Killah & Rusherking)" Khea	2021	—	—	—	—	—	—	—	—	—	—		non-album single
"Kippe Im Wind" Monet192	2022	—	—	—	—	—	—	—	—	—	66		Champions Club
"Keine Tränen" Badmómzjay	2022	—	—	—	—	—	—	—	—	—	8		Survival Mode
"Ain't Safe (ft. Don Toliver)" Trippie Redd	2022	98	—	17	—	—	—	—	—	10	—		non-album single
"Piza met Ananas" Snelle	2022	—	—	—	—	—	—	—	—	—	—	Netherlands (NVPI): Gold	1/3
"Sigue La Fiesta" Justin Quiles, Dalex, Santa Fe Klan	2023	—	—	—	—	—	—	—	—	—	—		Fast X (soundtrack)
"Get Back" YTB Fatt	2023	—	—	—	—	—	—	—	—	—	—	* United States (RIAA): Gold	Who Is Fatt
"Después del Party" Dalex	2023	—	—	—	—	—	—	—	—	—	—		Reggaeton Sex
"Perreándote (ft. Ryan Castro & Symon Dice)" Dalex	2023	—	—	—	—	—	—	—	—	—	—		Reggaeton Sex
"Bora Bora" Dalex	2023	—	—	—	—	—	—	—	—	—	—		Reggaeton Sex
"El DJ (ft. Trébol Clan & DJ Joe)" Dalex	2023	—	—	—	—	—	—	—	—	—	—		Reggaeton Sex
"Down" Dalex	2023	—	—	—	—	—	—	—	—	—	—		Reggaeton Sex
"Me Llora" Dalex	2023	—	—	—	—	—	—	—	—	—	—		Reggaeton Sex
"Amiga" Dalex	2023	—	—	—	—	—	—	—	—	—	—		Reggaeton Sex
"Took My Breath Away (ft. Skye Morales)" Trippie Redd	2023	—	—	—	—	—	—	—	26	—	—		A Love Letter to You 5
"Last Days" Trippie Redd	2023	—	—	—	—	—	—	—	30	—	—		A Love Letter to You 5
"Left 4 Dead" Trippie Redd	2023	—	—	—	—	—	—	—	—	—	—		A Love Letter to You 5
"Take Me Away (ft. Corbin (musician))" Trippie Redd	2023	—	—	—	—	—	—	—	40	—	—		A Love Letter to You 5
"Closed Doors (ft. Roddy Ricch)" Trippie Redd	2023	—	—	—	—	—	—	—	22	—	—		A Love Letter to You 5
"Wind (ft. the Kid Laroi)" Trippie Redd	2023	—	—	—	—	—	—	—	25	—	—		A Love Letter to You 5
"Sick To my Stomach" Natalie Jane	2024	—	—	—	—	—	—	—	—	—	—		Sick To My Stomach EP
"June" Natalie Jane	2024	—	—	—	—	—	—	—	—	—	—		Sick To My Stomach EP
"Low" KSI	2024	—	—	—	—	—	—	—	—	—	—		Thick of It/Low
"Whoa (Mind in Awe) Remix" XXXTentacion & Juice Wrld	2025	—	16	25	—	—	—	—	—	—	—		non-album single
"Easy (ft. Lay Zhang)" JVKE	2025	—	—	—	—	—	—	—	—	—	—		The Asia Tour: Blooming Season EP
"Just Because" Leah Kate	2025	—	—	—	—	—	—	—	—	—	—		non-album single
"Better Than Me (Wonho song)" Wonho	2025	—	—	—	—	—	—	—	—	—	—		Syndrome (Wonho album)
"Good Liar" Wonho	2025	—	—	—	—	—	—	—	—	—	—		Syndrome (Wonho album)
"If You Wanna" Wonho	2025	—	—	—	—	—	—	—	—	—	—		Syndrome (Wonho album)
"Act I: It Doesn't Take a Genius (To Ruin Everything)" Leah Kate	2025	—	—	—	—	—	—	—	—	—	—		Genius
"Act II: Too Hot To Learn My Lesson" Leah Kate	2025	—	—	—	—	—	—	—	—	—	—		Genius
"Act III: Self-Destruction Counts as Character Development" Leah Kate	2025	—	—	—	—	—	—	—	—	—	—		Genius
"Pop Out (ft Kabu)" InntRaw & Lil Pump	2025	—	—	—	—	—	—	—	—	—	—		non-album single
"Growing Pains" Monsta X	2026	—	—	—	—	—	—	—	—	—	—		unfold
"Aligned" Anna Margo	2026	—	—	—	—	—	—	—	—	—	—		Swings
"Selfish" Anna Margo	2026	—	—	—	—	—	—	—	—	—	—		Swings
"Paperbag Boy (ft. Young Thug" Trippie Redd	2026	—	—	—	—	—	—	—	—	—	—		NDA_(album)
"—" denotes a recording that did not chart or was not released in that territory.

=== Other charted & certified songs ===
List of songs as mixer, with selected chart positions and certifications, showing year released, performing artists and album name
Title	Year	Peak chart positions			Certifications	Album
Title	Year	US	US R&B	US Rap	Certifications	Album
“Up Like An Insomniac” XXXTentacion	2017	—	—	—	United States (RIAA): Gold	A Ghetto Christmas Carol E.P.
“Hate Will Never Win“ XXXTentacion	2017	—	—	—	United States (RIAA): Gold	A Ghetto Christmas Carol E.P.
"Whoa (Mind in Awe)" XXXTentacion	2018	37	3	—	United States (RIAA): Platinum; New Zealand (RMNZ): Platinum	Skins
"I Don't Let Go" XXXTentacion	2018	51	17	22	United States (RIAA): Gold	Skins
"One Minute (ft. Kanye West & Travis Barker" XXXTentacion	2018	62	—	23		Skins
"Staring At The Sky" XXXTentacion	2018	68	—	12		Skins

== Awards and nominations ==
=== Guinness World Records ===
Publication	Country	Song	Record
Guinness World Records	World Wide	XXXTentacion "Sad!"	Most Streamed Song in a Single Day

=== Grammy Awards ===
Year	Nominee / work	Award	Result	Ref.
2020	Spider-Man: Into the Spider-Verse (soundtrack)	62nd Annual Grammy Awards Grammy Award for Best Compilation Soundtrack for Visual Media	Nominated	

=== American Music Awards ===
Year	Nominee / work	Award	Result	Ref.
2018	17 (as mixer)	Favorite Album – Soul/R&B	Won	
2019	Spider-Man: Into the Spider-Verse (soundtrack) (as mixer)	American Music Award for Top Soundtrack	Nominated	

=== Billboard Music Awards ===
Year	Nominee / work	Award	Result	Ref.
2018	17 (as mixer)	Top Album – R&B	Nominated	
2019	Spider-Man: Into the Spider-Verse (soundtrack) (as mixer)	Top Soundtrack	Nominated	
2019	? (as mixer)	Top 200 Album	Nominated	
2019	? (as mixer)	Top Rap Album	Nominated	
2019	17 (as mixer)	Top R&B Album	Won	
2019	"Sad!" (as mixer)	Top Streaming Song (audio)	Nominated	
2019	"Sad!" (as mixer)	Top Streaming Song (video)	Nominated	

=== BET Hip-Hop Awards ===
Year	Nominee / work	Award	Result	Ref.
2019	YBN: The Mixtape (as mixer)	BET Hop-Hop Award for Best Mixtape	Nominated	

=== NAACP Image Awards ===
Year	Nominee / work	Award	Result	Ref.
2019	Spider-Man: Into the Spider-Verse (soundtrack) (as mixer)	50th NAACP Image Award for Outstanding Soundtrack/ Compilation	Nominated	

=== Edison Pop Awards ===
Year	Nominee / work	Award	Result	Ref.
2024	Meau - 22	Nederlandstalig	Won	

== See also ==
- Audio mixing
