= Revenge (XXXTentacion song) =

2017 single by XXXTentacion

Single by XXXTentacion

from the album 17
- Released: May 18, 2017
- Recorded: 2017
- Genre: Alternative rock; folk pop
- Length: 2:00
- Label: Bad Vibes Forever; Empire
- Songwriter: Jahseh Onfroy
- Producer: XXXTentacion

XXXTentacion singles chronology
"Gospel" / "Take a Step Back" (2017)	"Revenge" (2017)	"Str8 Shot" (2017)

"Revenge", originally titled as "Garrette's Revenge", is a song written, produced, and performed by American rapper XXXTentacion, released on May 18, 2017, by Bad Vibes Forever and Empire Distribution as the lead single from his debut studio album 17.

== Background ==
This song was previewed on Twitter on May 9 before the death of his friend, Jocelyn Flores, who committed suicide on May 14. XXXTentacion dedicated the song to her after her death. In the description of the song on SoundCloud, it says, "I love you Garette, rest in peace Jocelyn, I will have my revenge upon the world."

The artwork of the song was originally reported to have been Flores' partially scribbled suicide note which was found at the scene of her death, however the note was in fact written by Garette, a friend and collaborator of XXXTentacion.

== Charts ==
=== Weekly charts ===
Chart (2017)	Peak position
Canada Hot 100 (Billboard)	80
Italy (FIMI)	69
New Zealand Heatseekers (Recorded Music NZ)	4
US Billboard Hot 100	77
US Hot R&B/Hip-Hop Songs (Billboard)	37

Chart (2022)	Peak position
Czech Republic Singles Digital (ČNS IFPI)	89
Lithuania (AGATA)	17
Netherlands (Single Tip)	27
Slovakia (Singles Digitál Top 100)	64
UK Indie (OCC)	16

=== Year-end charts ===
Chart (2022)	Position
Lithuania (AGATA)	49

== Certifications ==
Region	Certification	Certified units/sales
Denmark (IFPI Danmark)	Platinum	90,000^{‡}
France (SNEP)	Gold	100,000^{‡}
Italy (FIMI)	Platinum	100,000^{‡}
Spain (Promusicae)	Gold	30,000^{‡}
New Zealand (RMNZ)	3× Platinum	90,000^{‡}
United Kingdom (BPI)	Platinum	600,000^{‡}
Streaming
Greece (IFPI Greece)	Platinum	2,000,000^{†}
^{‡} Sales+streaming figures based on certification alone.^{†} Streaming-only figures based on certification alone.
