= Sex, Love & Reggae =

Studio album by Gyptian
- Released: October 25, 2013
- Recorded: 2012–13
- Genre: Reggae, Dancehall
- Label: VP Records

Gyptian chronology
Hold You (2010)	Sex, Love & Reggae (2013)

Singles from Sex, Love & Reggae
- 1. "Wine Slow" Released: February 2, 2013; 2. "Non Stop" Released: May 10, 2013; 3. "Vixen" Released: October 24, 2013; 4. "Wet Fete" Released: March 24, 2014

Sex Love & Reggae is the fourth album by Jamaican reggae singer Gyptian. The album was released on 25 October 2013.

== Singles ==
- "Wine Slow" was released as the first single off the album in February 2013.
- "Non Stop" was released as the second single off the album on May 10, 2013.
- "Vixen" was released as the third single off the album on October 24, 2013.
- "Wet Fete" was released as the fourth single off the album on March 24, 2014.

== Track listing ==
No.	Title	Length
1.	"G Spot (Intro)"	0:47
2.	"A Reggae Morning"	3:49
3.	"Be Alright"	3:16
4.	"I'm So"	3:41
5.	"Overtime"	3:09
6.	"Vixen"	3:29
7.	"Sex, Love & Reggae"	3:21
8.	"Non Stop"	2:57
9.	"Wet Fete"	3:59
10.	"Turn Me On"	3:34
11.	"Wine Slow"	2:34
12.	"One More Time"	3:15
13.	"Majestic Love"	3:46
14.	"Good Girls"	3:40
15.	"Murderer"	4:58
16.	"True Colors"	4:02
17.	"My Number One"	4:15

== Charts ==
Chart (2013)	Peak position
US Reggae Albums (Billboard)	1
