= Jocelyn Flores =

2017 single by XXXTentacion

Single by XXXTentacion

from the album 17
- Released: October 31, 2017
- Recorded: 2017
- Genre: Alternative hip hop; emo rap; lofi hip hop
- Length: 1:59
- Label: Bad Vibes Forever; Empire
- Songwriters: Jahseh Onfroy; Ciara Nicole Simms (Note: Publicly known as Shiloh Dynasty)
- Producer: Potsu

XXXTentacion singles chronology
"Str8 Shot" (2017)	"Jocelyn Flores" (2017)	"Roll in Peace" (2017)

Audio sample
- "Jocelyn Flores": file; help

"Jocelyn Flores" is a song written and performed by American rapper XXXTentacion. It was originally released as the second track of his debut studio album 17 on August 17, 2017, before being sent to rhythmic radio on October 31 as the album's second single. The song is a homage to XXXTentacion's deceased friend, who is the song's namesake.

== Background ==
The song is dedicated to Jocelyn Amparo Flores, a 16-year-old native of The Bronx who later moved to Cleveland, Ohio. She flew to Florida to meet XXXTentacion and later committed suicide during the vacation on May 14, 2017. Flores' life and death have been subject to rumor and misinformation, which was addressed by a September 2018 article on The Daily Beast.

19-year-old XXXTentacion became infatuated with Flores after seeing her photographs on Twitter and first communicated with her on May 1, 2017. He invited her to his state of Florida and hired her as a model for his Revenge clothing line. Early reports mistakenly state that she was already a model and arrived in Florida purely for work, but she had not previously done such work. Another girl was also staying with the rapper, and while he was out to attend his cousin's party, a bag containing $7,000 in cash was raided; each girl blamed the other. Concerned that the tension between the two guests would end in violence, XXXTentacion expelled both girls from his home and rescinded the offer for Flores to model for him; she checked into the Hampton Inn in Coconut Creek shortly before midnight and was found dead in the morning. After her death, it was revealed that XXXTentacion had stated in a police report regarding the situation that he and Flores had been sexually active before she died.

XXXTentacion also dedicated the song "Revenge" to Flores shortly after she died.

== Composition ==
The song is built around a sample of producer Potsu's song "I'm Closing My Eyes", which includes vocals from Shiloh Dynasty.

== Commercial performance ==
"Jocelyn Flores" entered at number 31 on the US Billboard Hot 100 and eventually peaked at number 19 after his death. It debuted at number 56 on the UK Singles Chart, selling 5,998 units including sales and streams. The song also entered at number 14 on the UK R&B Chart, and number two on the UK Independent Chart.

== Personnel ==
- XXXTentacion – primary artist, songwriter
- Potsu – producer
- JonFX – mixing engineer
- Koen Heldens – mixing engineer

== Charts ==
=== Weekly charts ===
Chart (2017–2018)	Peak position
Australia (ARIA)	8
Austria (Ö3 Austria Top 40)	24
Belgium (Ultratip Bubbling Under Flanders)	10
Belgium (Ultratip Bubbling Under Wallonia)	17
Canada Hot 100 (Billboard)	14
Czech Republic Singles Digital (ČNS IFPI)	9
Denmark (Tracklisten)	14
Estonia (Eesti Tipp-40)	6
Finland (Suomen virallinen lista)	15
France (SNEP)	38
Hungary (Stream Top 40)	20
Ireland (IRMA)	22
Italy (FIMI)	30
Latvia (DigiTop100)	33
Netherlands (Single Top 100)	17
New Zealand (Recorded Music NZ)	4
Norway (VG-lista)	10
Scottish Singles Sales (Official Charts)	60
Slovakia Singles Digital (ČNS IFPI)	11
Spain (PROMUSICAE)	51
Sweden (Sverigetopplistan)	7
Switzerland (Schweizer Hitparade)	21
UK Singles (Official Charts)	39
UK Indie (Official Charts)	2
UK Hip Hop/R&B (Official Charts)	14
US Billboard Hot 100	19
US Hot R&B/Hip-Hop Songs (Billboard)	13

=== Year-end charts ===
Chart (2017)	Position
US Hot R&B/Hip-Hop Songs (Billboard)	75

Chart (2018)	Position
Denmark (Tracklisten)	74
Estonia (IFPI)	15
France (SNEP)	198
New Zealand (Recorded Music NZ)	43
Sweden (Sverigetopplistan)	61

== Certifications ==
Region	Certification	Certified units/sales
Denmark (IFPI Danmark)	2× Platinum	180,000^{‡}
France (SNEP)	Diamond	333,333^{‡}
Germany (BVMI)	Platinum	400,000^{‡}
Italy (FIMI)	2× Platinum	140,000^{‡}
New Zealand (RMNZ)	6× Platinum	180,000^{‡}
Spain (Promusicae)	Platinum	60,000^{‡}
United Kingdom (BPI)	2× Platinum	1,200,000^{‡}
United States (RIAA)	8× Platinum	8,000,000^{‡}
Streaming
Greece (IFPI Greece)	Platinum	2,000,000^{†}
^{‡} Sales+streaming figures based on certification alone.^{†} Streaming-only figures based on certification alone.
