= Gyptian =

Jamaican reggae singer (born 1983)

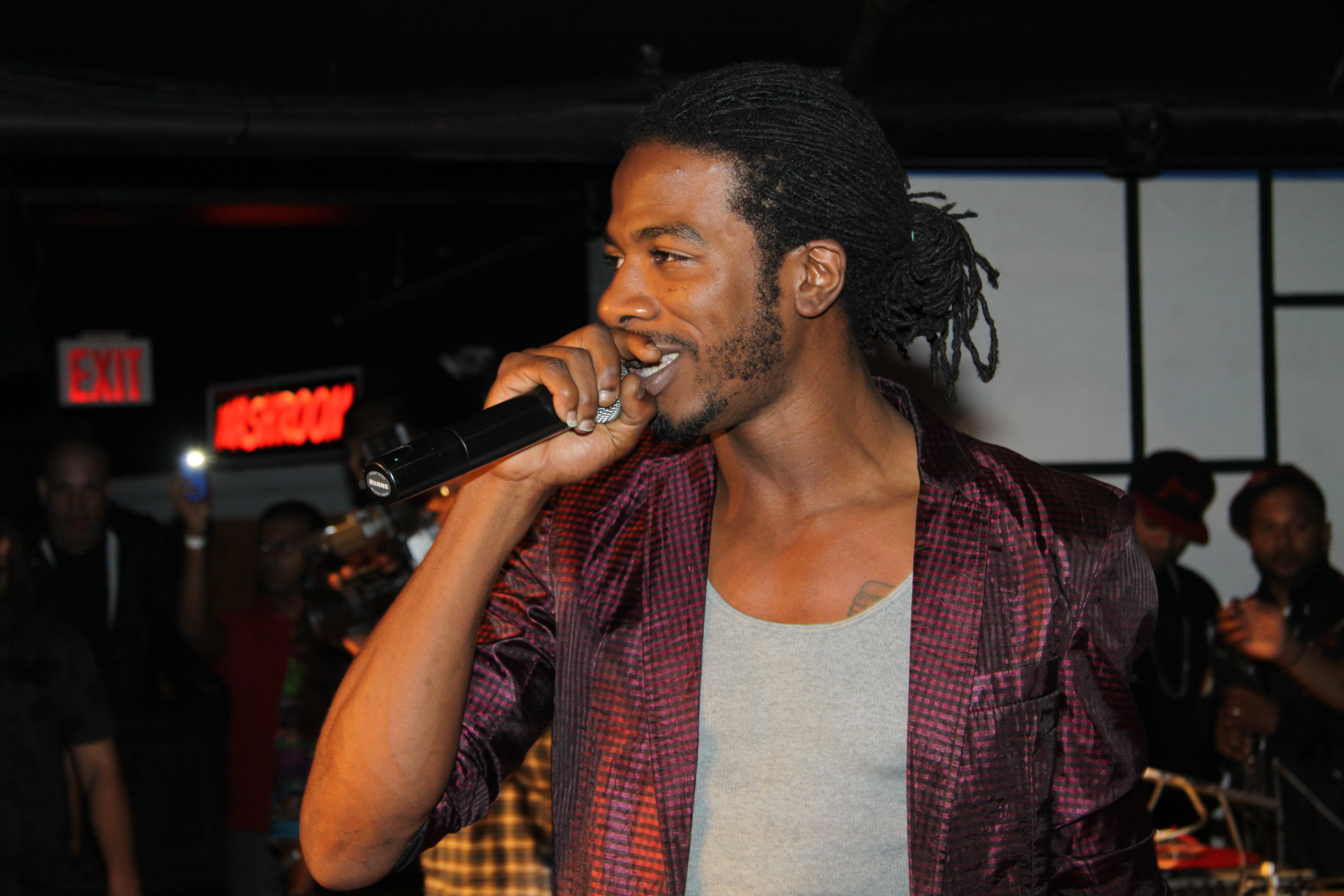
- Gyptian in 2010

Background information
- Born: Windel Beneto Edwards; 25 October 1983 (age 42); Kingston, Jamaica
- Genres: Reggae; roots reggae; lovers rock; dancehall
- Occupation: Singer
- Years active: 2004–present
- Labels: VP

Windel Beneto Edwards (born 25 October 1983), better known by his stage name Gyptian (/ˈdʒɪpʃən/), is a Jamaican reggae singer. He often appears with roots reggae songs within the reggae subgenre dancehall.

== Early life ==
Born to a Seventh-day Adventist mother Pauline McCaulsky and Rastafarian father, Edwards received his musical calling at the age of seven, when he began singing in the church. He grew up in a small community in Rural St. Andrew, Jamaica called King Weston District. Recognizing his talent, his parents introduced him to Mr. Wong, a record producer from Portmore, St. Catherine. "I did not take it seriously," said Edwards "My family members have always been carrying me to Portmore to see him, but I usually disappear. One day, they dropped me off at his studio and left me and it all began there."

== Career ==
=== Career beginnings ===
Under the guidance of Mr. Wong and Earl Chinna Smith, Gyptian honed his sound, winning the 2004 Star Search talent competition at Kens Wild Flower Lounge in Portmore, earning him a spot at Sting 2004, dubbed the 'greatest one night reggae show on earth'.

The singer earned his nickname from his habit of tying a shirt around his head and twisting his chin hair like an Egyptian pharaoh. In 2005, he scored two hits, "Is There A Place" on the Seasons Riddim and "Serious Times".

Nominated for Best New Entertainer at the 2006 International Reggae and World Music Awards, the singer has been dominating the Jamaican charts with hits including "Is There a Place", "Beautiful Lady", and the chart-topping ballad, "Mama, Don't Cry".

On 12 September 2006, Gyptian released his first album My Name Is Gyptian on VP Records. On 12 December 2007, Gyptian, while in New York City, shot the music video, directed by Rhona Fox, for his new single, "I Can Feel Your Pain" (Cloud Nine Riddim) Produced by JonFX. The song was the first to be confirmed to appear on his second album I Can Feel Your Pain, which was released in 2008.

=== 2010 and crossover success ===
As of the end of May 2010, his single "Hold Yuh" had peaked at number 91 on the Billboard Hot 100, number 33 on the Billboard R&B/Hip-Hop Chart, number 6 on the Billboard Heatseekers Songs Chart and had been at the top of the Reggae Digital Songs chart for nine consecutive weeks.

In June, the song re-entered the Billboard Hot 100 and eventually reached a new peak of 77 on that chart, number 3 on the Heatseekers Songs chart, 31 on the Billboard R&B/Hip-Hop Chart, 63 on the Radio Songs chart and an astonishing peak of 28 on the Billboard Rhythmic Top 40, capitalizing its crossover success. The song also peaked at number 1 on the Dancehall/Reggae fusion Charts of the Jamaica Weekly Music Charts for two consecutive weeks. In Canada it peaked at No. 69 on the Canadian Hot 100. The official remix for the song features rapper Nicki Minaj. It spent 29 weeks on the Billboard R&B/Hip-Hop Chart and 15 weeks on the Billboard Hot 100.

Gyptian had further chart success with his third album Hold You, which reached number 2 on Billboard's Reggae Albums Chart. The title track, "Hold Yuh", became a multi-chart hit worldwide. According to Billboard magazine, "not since Wayne Wonder's "No Letting Go" has an underground reggae artist garnered as much attention in the United States as Jamaica's own Gyptian."

The song also became popular in the UK, and was released there on 7 November by Ministry of Sound Recordings, in an EP which will include remixes by Shy FX, Major Lazer and Toddla T.

In October 2012, he released the SLR EP, which included three tracks from his forthcoming album. His fourth album Sex, Love & Reggae was released in October 2013 and entered the Billboard Top Reggae Albums chart at number one.

His latest album, Nothing to Lose, was set for release in April 2015, but never got released.

== Artistry ==
His style of reggae music is considered lovers rock and roots reggae, with songs about political issues and love. His musical and lyrical style has been compared to established Jamaican artists, such as Sizzla, Luciano and Beres Hammond.

== Personal life ==
Gyptian is currently single and is living in Jamaica. In June 2006 his twin sons died after being born prematurely.

On 8 June 2010, he crashed his motorbike and sustained minor head and shoulder injuries.

He is Rastafarian, and this is supported by lyrics in some of his songs, including "Leave Us Alone", where chants about Selassie I can be heard.

== Discography ==
=== Albums ===
Title	Album details	Peak chart positions			
Title	Album details	US	US R&B	US Heat	US Reggae
My Name Is Gyptian	Released: 18 September 2006; Label: VP	—	—	—	13
I Can Feel Your Pain	Released: 3 November 2008; Label: VP; Format: CD	—	—	—	4
Hold You	Released: 19 July 2010; Label: VP; Format: CD, digital download	186	34	6	2
Sex, Love & Reggae	Released: 25 October 2013; Label: VP; Format: CD, digital download	—	—	—	1

=== EPs ===
Title	Album details
SLR	Released: October 16, 2012; Label: VP; Format: Digital download

=== Singles ===
Year	Title	Peak chart positions						Certifications	Album
Year	Title	BEL (FL)	CAN	FRA	UK	US	US R&B	Certifications	Album
2010	"Hold You"	31	69	45	16	77	31	BPI: 2× Platinum	Hold You
2011	"Nah Let Go"	—	—	—	—	—	—		Hold You
2013	"Wine Slow"	—	—	—	—	—	—	BPI: Silver	Sex, Love & Reggae
2013	"Non Stop"	—	—	—	—	—	—		Sex, Love & Reggae
2013	"Vixen"	—	—	—	—	—	—		Sex, Love & Reggae
2014	"Wet Fete"	—	—	—	—	—	—		Sex, Love & Reggae
2015	"All on Me"	—	—	—	—	—	—		Nothing to Lose
2017	"Belong to You" (featuring Lisa Hyper)	—	—	—	—	—	—		TBA

=== Featured singles ===
Year	Title	Peak chart positions						Certifications	Album
Year	Title	BEL (FL)	CAN	FRA	UK	US	US R&B	Certifications	Album
2011	"Pum Pum Shorts" (Mr Vegas featuring Teairra Mari & Gyptian)	—	—	—	—	—	—		Non-album singles
2012	"Destiny" (Junior X and Gyptian)	—	—	—	—	—	—		Non-album singles
2012	"Ma'Gyptian" (Magician Remix) (Ice Prince featuring Gyptian)	—	—	—	—	—	—		Everybody Loves Prince
2015	"My Number 1" (Stylo G featuring Gyptian)	—	—	—	45	—	—		Non-album single
2015	"Wherever You Go" (Karl Wolf featuring Gyptian)	—	—	—	—	—	—		Non-album single
2020	"Move It That Way" (Gisto, featuring Gyptian)	—	—	—	—	—	—		"Relief"
2023	"Gotta" (featuring De La Ghetto & Oryane)	—	—	—	—	—	—		Single
