= 17 (XXXTentacion album) =

Studio album by XXXTentacion
- Released: August 25, 2017
- Recorded: 2017
- Genres: Emo rap; lofi hip hop
- Length: 21:54
- Labels: Bad Vibes Forever; Empire
- Producers: XXXTentacion; Dex Duncan; Dub tha Prodigy; John Cunningham; Natra Average; Nick Mira; Potsu; Taz Taylor; Tobias Jesso Jr.

XXXTentacion chronology
Members Only, Vol. 3 (2017)	17 (2017)	A Ghetto Christmas Carol (2017)

Singles from 17
- 1. "Revenge" Released: May 18, 2017; 2. "Jocelyn Flores" Released: October 31, 2017; 3. "Fuck Love" Released: January 23, 2018

Alternative cover
- CD cover

17 is the debut studio album by American rapper XXXTentacion. It was released through Bad Vibes Forever and Empire Distribution on August 25, 2017. With a runtime of just under 22 minutes, 17 is a brief album and does not feature a song longer than three minutes. The album was supported by the lead single "Revenge", and is XXXTentacion's second commercial record, following the compilation mixtape of the same name (2017). 17 includes a sole guest appearance from Trippie Redd and samples by Shiloh Dynasty. Production was handled by XXXTentacion, among others.

The album is built on acoustic and piano-driven songs, rather than the "turn-up" style and distortion bass sounds that was popular in XXXTentacion's native Florida scene. It experiments with a variety of genres, such as emo, lo-fi, indie rock, alternative R&B and grunge, while the lyrics are based around themes such as suicide, failed relationships, and infidelity. XXXTentacion stated that the album's target audience is people who suffer with depression, and that the album is also an "entry" into his mind.

The album was supported by the singles "Revenge", "Jocelyn Flores", and "Fuck Love", which all debuted on the Billboard Hot 100 along with "Everybody Dies in Their Nightmares", "Depression & Obsession", "Save Me" and "Carry On". "Jocelyn Flores", "Everybody Dies in Their Nightmares" and "Fuck Love" also debuted in the top 100 of the UK Singles Chart.

Although 17 was marketed with no radio play or much press coverage, it was a commercial success and was positively reviewed by several publications. It debuted at number two on the US Billboard 200, with 87,000 album-equivalent units, and has been certified double platinum by the Recording Industry Association of America (RIAA). It also charted highly in numerous European countries, including top five positions in Denmark, the Netherlands, Finland, Italy, Sweden, and a number one position in Norway. The album has also been certified platinum in Canada, Denmark and New Zealand. XXXTentacion posthumously won Favourite Soul/R&B Album for 17 at the 2018 American Music Awards.

== Background ==
While XXXTentacion was in jail for battery charges on his allegedly pregnant ex-girlfriend, he signed an exclusive distribution deal with Empire Distribution. Empire Distribution made an official announcement on March 2, 2017, while he was still in jail that his debut album Bad Vibes would be released in spring 2017. Talking to XXX while in jail, XXXTentacion announced 17, I Need Jesus, and Members Only, Vol. 3 saying:

I got this really really, really good album called 17. That's more of an alternative, R&B sound. Then I've got this mixtape called I Need Jesus, which is mainly rap and the underground sound I did. So I'm trying to give my fans and anybody that comes in and listens to me everything with the mixtape and album. And then I want to come out with Members Only Vol. 3. People are gonna be really surprised about the shit I drop.

XXXTentacion later reaffirmed the announcement of 17, Revenge, Members Only Vol. 3 and I Need Jesus during an interview with WMIB following his release from prison in March 2017. He later used the app Periscope to talk to his followers and announce the three albums once again. He later said that 17 would be released after he finished working on Members Only Vol. 3 with his collective, "Members Only". Members Only Vol. 3 was released on June 26, 2017. He began to preview short snippets on his Instagram page that were later taken down, one of the snippets had the caption "Working on the [sic] album, what do you think?".

== Themes and composition ==
XXXTentacion stated that the album's target audience is people who suffer with depression, and that the album is a 'gateway' into his mind. The lyrics for 17 are based around suicide, failed relationships, and infidelity. It also focuses on events in XXXTentacion's life and involves a lot of internal dialogue. Speaking on the sound of 17, XXXTentacion explained that the album was different from his previous works, saying "If you listen to me to get hype or to not think, don't buy this album, this one is for the depression, for the depressed ones, for the lost ones."

Speaking to XXL, XXXTentacion said the album would consist of "an alternative R&B sound". The album takes a different style from XXXTentacion's traditional music which is often considered rap rock and trap music. The album adapts different genres of music, including emo and indie rock to create an unconventional style that fits within the genre of alternative R&B. The album itself is produced mainly by XXXTentacion, Natra Average and Potsu, a producer who generally creates lo-fi instrumental hip hop on SoundCloud.

Andrew Matson of Mass Appeal highlighted that XXXTentacion "is at the forefront of the current rock & roll twist on hip-hop...and constructs an emo record that calls on some of his past work (the guitar stuff) but completely leaves behind his popular turn-up style and distortion bass" that was popular in the Florida scene. Matson further described the songs on 17 as mostly acoustic guitars and piano-driven. Jon Powell of Respect. called the album an "emotional rollercoaster contained of different genres, all kept together by XXX's ever-changing lyricism and Aaron Lewis-esque harmonics", and that it "has you in absolute awe of [XXXtentacion's] talent, even in the midst of his alleged past transgressions."

== Promotion ==
Snippets were released showing him in a collaboration with Kodak Black, Lil JJ, and Juicy J. He later announced via his Snapchat story that the release date for 17 was August 25, 2017. In the same story, he claimed that the album would be different from his previous works and more for people with depression.

XXXTentacion previewed snippets on August 6, 2017, via his Snapchat story. The snippets shown was his iTunes library page with the album being played showcasing a tracklist of 8 songs. He kept his thumb on the feature that showcases the song count on the computer monitor and didn't announce the tracklist as official. The songs showcased in the snippets included "Jocelyn Flores", "Save Me", "Fuck Love" featuring Trippie Redd, "Orlando" and "Ayala (Outro)". XXL's Vernon Coleman called the snippets "very somber". On August 22, 2017, X revealed the official tracklist alongside the final cover for the album. The day before the album's release, the song "Fuck Love" featuring Trippie Redd was uploaded to SoundCloud.

=== Singles ===
The lead single, "Revenge", was released on May 18, 2017, for streaming and digital download, originally titled as "Garrette's Revenge".

The second single, "Jocelyn Flores", was sent to rhythmic radio on October 31, 2017.

The third single, "Fuck Love", featuring Trippie Redd, was sent to rhythmic radio on January 23, 2018.

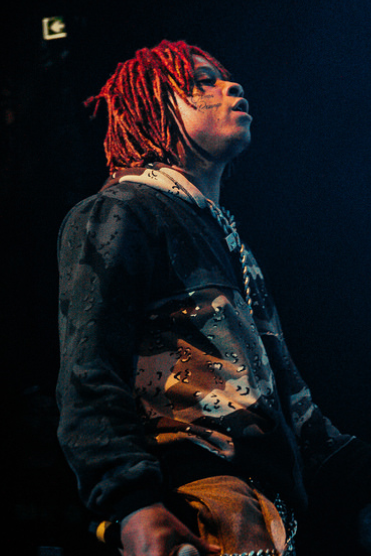
Trippie Redd was the sole feature on the album.

=== Instagram video controversy ===
On August 23, 2017, Onfroy posted a short 3.5-second clip of what appeared to be him hanging himself from a tree to his Instagram account. The video generated rumors and concern that Onfroy had indeed committed suicide. However, many were quick to point out that the video was fake and suspected it was a publicity stunt to draw more attention to his upcoming album, which the press condemned and heavily criticized the rapper for.

Later in the day, Onfroy posted another clip to his Instagram, showing more clips of the hanging, but this time elaborating that the clips were a teaser for an upcoming music video. He later offered an explanation of the situation fully and publicly apologized on his Instagram.

== Critical reception ==
Professional ratings
Review scores
Source	Rating
Gigsoup	81%
Pitchfork	6.5/10
Sputnikmusic	3/5

17 received generally favorable reviews. Meaghan Garvey of Pitchfork stated that 17 "presents XXXTentacion as impressively adept at reconciling his influences into a sound that is shockingly elegant, even at its most unpolished—an album whose disparate influences dissolve in an acid bath of raw feeling." Andrew Matson from Mass Appeal described the album as "musically excellent, morally problematic". Pigeons and Planes' Eric Skelton called the album's composition "progressive" and "genre-defiant." Mitch Findlay of HotNewHipHop called it "different from your average hip hop album", highlighting its lo-fi aesthetic, experimentation with guitar arrangements and vocals.

Notable figures in the hip hop music industry also gave recognition to the album, including American rapper Kendrick Lamar, who wrote on Twitter, "listen to [17] if you feel anything. raw thoughts." XXXTentacion posthumously won Favourite Soul/R&B Album for 17 at the 2018 American Music Awards, and the album received a Top R&B Album nomination at the 2018 Billboard Music Awards.

== Commercial performance ==
17 was released on August 25, 2017, on iTunes, Spotify and Apple Music for streaming. Following the release, the album was promoted on social media by numerous other artists including Kendrick Lamar, Tory Lanez, 9th Wonder, and Lil Yachty. The sales projections for the album, managed by the magazine Hits estimated that 17 would collect over 80 million streams and would sell 74–79,000 album-equivalent units in the US, including 16–18,000 pure sales.

In the United States, 17 debuted at number two on the Billboard 200 with 87,000 album-equivalent units, of which 18,000 were pure sales. 17 dropped down to No. 3 on the Billboard 200 for its second week of release with 51,275 total album equivalent units sold. In its third week, 17 fell to No. 6 with 40,100 album-equivalent units sold. 17 had sold 313,000 album-equivalent units by October 12, 2017, dropping to No. 12 in the same week. Seven songs—"Jocelyn Flores", "Revenge", "Fuck Love", "Everybody Dies in Their Nightmares", "Depression & Obsession", "Save Me" and "Carry On"—debuted in the Billboard Hot 100 at numbers 31, 77, 41, 54, 91, 94 and 95 respectively, with "Jocelyn Flores" becoming XXXTentacion's highest charting song since "Look at Me", which peaked at 31 on September 16, 2017. Following XXXTentacion's death, 17 re-entered the Billboard 200 at number seven, earning 55,000 album-equivalent units. It has been certified double platinum by the Recording Industry Association of America (RIAA).

17 debuted at number one in Norway (where it remained for three weeks) and in the top twenty in numerous album charts, including the UK Albums Chart, where it entered at number 12, selling 4,520 album-equivalent units. The album also charted in Belgium, the Netherlands, New Zealand, Italy, and Sweden. Three songs—"Jocelyn Flores", "Everybody Dies in Their Nightmares" and "Fuck Love"—debuted in the top 100 of the UK Singles Chart, at numbers 56, 88 and 99, respectively. "Jocelyn Flores" peaked at 39 on the UK Singles Chart. The album has been certified platinum in Canada, Denmark and New Zealand. Rolling Stone reported that 17 "hit the charts with no record label besides his own imprint, no radio play and a near-total press blackout."

== Track listing ==
17 track listing
No.	Title	Writer(s)	Producer(s)	Length
1.	"The Explanation"	Jahseh Onfroy	XXXTentacion	0:50
2.	"Jocelyn Flores"	Onfroy; Ciara Nicole Simms	Potsu	1:59
3.	"Depression & Obsession"	Onfroy	XXXTentacion	2:24
4.	"Everybody Dies in Their Nightmares"	Onfroy; Simms	Potsu	1:35
5.	"Revenge"	Onfroy	XXXTentacion	2:00
6.	"Save Me"	Onfroy; JB; Sy Brockington; Dion Davenport; Frederick Davenport; Billy Garcia; Joseph Gardner; Christopher Gibbs; Jovan Peterson; Mandell Strawter	Natra Average; Dub tha Prodigy	2:43
7.	"Dead Inside (Interlude)"	Onfroy; Brockington; Gibbs; Peterson; Strawter	Natra Average; XXXTentacion	1:26
8.	"Fuck Love" (with Trippie Redd)	Onfroy; Nick Mira; Danny Snodgrass Jr.; Dexter Randell; Michael White IV	Mira; Taz Taylor; Dex Duncan	2:26
9.	"Carry On"	Onfroy; Simms	Potsu	2:09
10.	"Orlando"	Onfroy; Tobias Jesso Jr.	XXXTentacion; Jesso Jr.	2:43
11.	"Ayala (Outro)"	Onfroy; John Cunningham; Jesso Jr.	XXXTentacion; Cunningham; Jesso Jr.	1:39
Total length:				21:54

Notes

- "Revenge" was originally titled "garette's REVENGE" but later changed with the release of the album.
- "Save Me" has an unreleased extended version featuring a guitar. This was scrapped for unknown reasons.
- The album was also supposed to feature a collaboration track with Australian rapper Lil Bo Weep, but the track was not included on the album for unknown reasons.

Samples

- "Jocelyn Flores", "Everybody Dies in Their Nightmares" & "Carry On" contain samples from audio clips of singer Shiloh Dynasty.

== Personnel ==
- XXXTentacion – vocals, production, executive production, composition
- Shiloh Dynasty – vocals
- Trippie Redd – vocals, composition
- John Cunningham – production
- Dex Duncan – production
- Dub tha Prodigy – production
- Natra Average – production, piano
- Nick Mira – production
- Potsu – production
- Taz Taylor – production
- Tobias Jesso Jr. – production, piano
- Koen Heldens – mix engineering, master engineering
- Jon FX – mixing engineering
- Thierry Chaunay – engineering, production.

== Charts ==
=== Weekly charts ===
Weekly chart performance
Chart (2017–2018)	Peak position
Australian Albums (ARIA)	29
Austrian Albums (Ö3 Austria)	21
Belgian Albums (Ultratop Flanders)	9
Belgian Albums (Ultratop Wallonia)	16
Canadian Albums (Billboard)	2
Czech Albums (ČNS IFPI)	8
Danish Albums (Hitlisten)	2
Dutch Albums (Album Top 100)	4
Estonian Albums (Eesti Tipp-40)	1
Finnish Albums (Suomen virallinen lista)	4
French Albums (SNEP)	16
Irish Albums (Official Charts)	9
Italian Albums (FIMI)	3
Latvian Albums (LaIPA)	3
New Zealand Albums (RMNZ)	2
Norwegian Albums (VG-lista)	1
Slovak Albums (ČNS IFPI)	13
Swedish Albums (Sverigetopplistan)	2
Swiss Albums (Schweizer Hitparade)	26
UK Albums (Official Charts)	11
UK R&B Albums (Official Charts)	4
US Billboard 200	2
US Top R&B Albums	1
US Top R&B/Hip-Hop Albums (Billboard)	2

2022–2024 weekly chart performance
Chart (2022–2024)	Peak position
German Albums (Offizielle Top 100)	100
Polish Albums (ZPAV)	63

=== Year-end charts ===
2017 year-end chart performance
Chart (2017)	Position
Belgian Albums (Ultratop Flanders)	169
Danish Albums (Hitlisten)	41
Icelandic Albums (Tónlistinn)	16
Italian Albums (FIMI)	91
New Zealand Albums (RMNZ)	40
Swedish Albums (Sverigetopplistan)	28
US Billboard 200	80
US Top R&B/Hip-Hop Albums (Billboard)	27

2018 year-end chart performance
Chart (2018)	Position
Belgian Albums (Ultratop Flanders)	39
Belgian Albums (Ultratop Wallonia)	121
Canadian Albums (Billboard)	23
Danish Albums (Hitlisten)	9
Dutch Albums (MegaCharts)	26
Estonian Albums (IFPI)	2
French Albums (SNEP)	105
Icelandic Albums (Tónlistinn)	7
Irish Albums (IRMA)	38
New Zealand Albums (RMNZ)	13
Swedish Albums (Sverigetopplistan)	7
UK Albums (OCC)	62
US Billboard 200	19
US Top R&B/Hip-Hop Albums (Billboard)	15

2019 year-end chart performance
Chart (2019)	Position
Belgian Albums (Ultratop Flanders)	70
Belgian Albums (Ultratop Wallonia)	166
Danish Albums (Hitlisten)	50
Dutch Albums (Album Top 100)	54
Estonian Albums (IFPI)	14
Icelandic Albums (Tónlistinn)	29
New Zealand Albums (RMNZ)	30
Swedish Albums (Sverigetopplistan)	33
US Billboard 200	60
US Top R&B/Hip-Hop Albums (Billboard)	44

2020 year-end chart performance
Chart (2020)	Position
Belgian Albums (Ultratop Flanders)	65
Belgian Albums (Ultratop Wallonia)	174
Danish Albums (Hitlisten)	57
Dutch Albums (Album Top 100)	53
Icelandic Albums (Tónlistinn)	31
Swedish Albums (Sverigetopplistan)	35
US Billboard 200	108

2021 year-end chart performance
Chart (2021)	Position
Belgian Albums (Ultratop Flanders)	77
Belgian Albums (Ultratop Wallonia)	166
Danish Albums (Hitlisten)	69
Dutch Albums (Album Top 100)	74
Icelandic Albums (Tónlistinn)	50
Swedish Albums (Sverigetopplistan)	54
US Billboard 200	160

2022 year-end chart performance
Chart (2022)	Position
Belgian Albums (Ultratop Flanders)	74
Belgian Albums (Ultratop Wallonia)	161
Danish Albums (Hitlisten)	77
Dutch Albums (Album Top 100)	79
Icelandic Albums (Tónlistinn)	52
Lithuanian Albums (AGATA)	20
Swedish Albums (Sverigetopplistan)	69
US Billboard 200	130

2023 year-end chart performance
Chart (2023)	Position
Belgian Albums (Ultratop Flanders)	100
Belgian Albums (Ultratop Wallonia)	166
Icelandic Albums (Tónlistinn)	100
Swedish Albums (Sverigetopplistan)	85

2024 year-end chart performance
Chart (2024)	Position
Belgian Albums (Ultratop Flanders)	71
Belgian Albums (Ultratop Wallonia)	148
Dutch Albums (Album Top 100)	90
Hungarian Albums (MAHASZ)	81
Icelandic Albums (Tónlistinn)	69
Swedish Albums (Sverigetopplistan)	80

2025 year-end chart performance
Chart (2025)	Position
Belgian Albums (Ultratop Flanders)	185

=== Decade-end charts ===
Decade-end chart performance
Chart (2010–2019)	Position
US Billboard 200	92

== Certifications and sales ==
Certifications and sales
Region	Certification	Certified units/sales
Belgium (BRMA)	Gold	10,000^{‡}
Canada (Music Canada)	Platinum	80,000^{‡}
Denmark (IFPI Danmark)	4× Platinum	80,000^{‡}
France (SNEP)	Platinum	100,000^{‡}
Iceland (Tónlistinn)	—	7,331
Italy (FIMI)	Platinum	50,000^{‡}
New Zealand (RMNZ)	2× Platinum	30,000^{‡}
United Kingdom (BPI)	Platinum	300,000^{‡}
United States (RIAA)	3× Platinum	3,000,000^{‡}
^{‡} Sales+streaming figures based on certification alone.

== Release history ==
Release history and formats
Region	Date	Format(s)	Label	Ref.
Various	August 25, 2017	Streaming; digital download	Bad Vibes Forever	
Various	August 25, 2018	CD; vinyl	Bad Vibes Forever	
