= Angel Numbers / Ten Toes =

2023 song by Chris Brown

Song by Chris Brown

from the album 11:11
- Released: November 10, 2023
- Recorded: 2023
- Genre: R&B
- Length: 5:06
- Label: RCA
- Songwriters: Chris Brown; Brian Mitchell; Christian Ward; Christopher Dotson; Ethan Hayes; Gabriel Roland; Jamal Gaines; Juan Ramon Luis Mellan; Lance Hunter; Leon Youngblood; Leon Krol; Troy Taylor; Matthias Ringleb; Ebenezer Marango
- Producers: Hitmaka; RoccStar; DSTRK; Haze; JuanRa; Troy Taylor; Slim Pharaoh

Music video
- "Angel Numbers / Ten Toes" on YouTube

"Angel Numbers / Ten Toes" is a song by American singer Chris Brown. It serves as the opening track of Brown's eleventh studio album, 11:11, released on November 10, 2023. Despite not being released as a single, the track became the highest-charting song from the album in several countries, including the United Kingdom, Germany, Netherlands, Ireland, France and Switzerland.

The music video for "Angel Numbers / Ten Toes" was released on February 14, 2024.

== Background and composition ==
"Angel Numbers / Ten Toes" is an R&B track, composed of two distinct parts. The song's first half was described by Kayla Sandiford of Renowned for Sound as an "emotive, dreamlike acoustic introduction", with Brown seeking out "healing through a wish for refuge from the pressures of mental health". Edward Bowser of Medium said that "The first half sets an acoustic, almost intergalactic feel" with Brown embracing the 11:11 theme, while "Ten Toes" "ramps up the intensity" towards a more hip-hop-influenced sound, while the crooner "speaks candidly about battling anxiety". According to Billboard, the track’s lyrics focus on fighting anxiety and depression.

== Music video ==
Chris Brown released the music video for "Angel Numbers/Ten Toes", directed by Jamar Harding, on Valentine's Day 2024. It stars Sierra Capri in the role of a siren.

=== Synopsis ===
The music video opens with a scene of Brown entering a car in the desert, reminiscent of his "Don't Judge Me" visual. He carries a large, oversized bag in the backseat. He embarks on a drive through the desert. The car eventually runs out of gas. Forced to continue on foot, he walks through the desert carrying the bag. He eventually collapses under the weight of the bag. As he lies on the ground, his chakras are highlighted. Suddenly, he is buried alive in the sand. As he sinks deeper, he reaches out with his arms.

As the intro to "Ten Toes" plays, Brown finds himself lying on the ground in a dark forest. He then begins to walk deeper into the woods. Lurking in the shadows are creatures silently observing him. Brown turns around and forcefully stomps the ground. As he continues, a siren emerges from the water, accompanied by snakes. She approaches Brown, trapping him against a tree with the snakes. A light appears from a distance, capturing Brown and the siren's attention, causing the snakes to release their grip. He attempts to flee, but the siren tackles him with a snake, dragging him across the forest floor. Brown is overwhelmed as the snakes swarm over him, completely enveloping him. He suddenly awakens in the desert. As he slowly gets to his feet, he sees his three children waving at him. The video ends with him walking towards his children.

== Charts ==
=== Weekly charts ===
Weekly chart performance for "Angel Numbers / Ten Toes"
Chart (2023–2024)	Peak position
Australia Hip Hop/R&B (ARIA)	24
Austria (Ö3 Austria Top 40)	44
Denmark (Tracklisten)	18
France (SNEP)	154
Germany (GfK)	33
Global 200 (Billboard)	164
Greece International (IFPI)	36
Ireland (IRMA)	53
Luxembourg (Billboard)	21
Netherlands (Single Top 100)	17
New Zealand Hot Singles (RMNZ)	3
Nigeria (TurnTable Top 100)	87
Norway (VG-lista)	18
Portugal (AFP)	64
South Africa (TOSAC)	13
Sweden (Sverigetopplistan)	68
Switzerland (Schweizer Hitparade)	5
UK Singles (Official Charts)	31
UK Hip Hop/R&B (Official Charts)	8
US Bubbling Under Hot 100 (Billboard)	7
US Hot R&B/Hip-Hop Songs (Billboard)	33

=== Year-end charts ===
2024 year-end chart performance for "Angel Numbers / Ten Toes"
Chart (2024)	Position
South Africa (TOSAC)	17

== Certifications ==
Certifications for "Angel Numbers / Ten Toes"
Region	Certification	Certified units/sales
Belgium (BRMA)	Gold	20,000^{‡}
Canada (Music Canada)	Gold	40,000^{‡}
Denmark (IFPI Danmark)	Gold	45,000^{‡}
France (SNEP)	Gold	100,000^{‡}
New Zealand (RMNZ)	Platinum	30,000^{‡}
Nigeria (TCSN)	Silver	25,000^{‡}
Switzerland (IFPI Switzerland)	Gold	15,000^{‡}
United Kingdom (BPI)	Gold	400,000^{‡}
United States (RIAA)	Gold	500,000^{‡}
^{‡} Sales+streaming figures based on certification alone.
