= Fuck Love (song) =

Single by XXXTentacion featuring Trippie Redd

from the album 17
- Released: January 23, 2018
- Recorded: 2017
- Genre: Emo rap; R&B
- Length: 2:26
- Label: Bad Vibes Forever; Empire
- Songwriters: Jahseh Onfroy; Nicholas Mira; Michael White II
- Producers: Nick Mira; Taz Taylor; Dex Duncan

XXXTentacion singles chronology
"Again" (2017)	"Fuck Love" (2018)	"Banded Up" (2018)

Trippie Redd singles chronology
"18" (2018)	"Fuck Love" (2018)	"High" (2018)

Audio video
- "Fuck Love" on YouTube

"Fuck Love" is a song by American rapper XXXTentacion featuring fellow American rapper Trippie Redd, taken from the former's debut studio album 17. Written alongside Nick Mira, who produced it with Taz Taylor and Dex Duncan, the song was released on August 24, 2017, a day ahead of the album's release, before being sent to rhythmic radio on January 23, 2018, as its third single. On June 18, 2023, exactly 5 years after X's death, the song was certified RIAA Diamond, selling over 10 million copies, marking XXXTentacion and Redd's second and first Diamond certification, respectively.

== Commercial performance ==
"Fuck Love" entered at number 41 on the US Billboard Hot 100 and eventually peaked at number 28 after his death. On March 29, 2019, the song became the most streamed song ever on the streaming platform SoundCloud with 206 million streams.

== Personnel ==
- XXXTentacion – primary artist, songwriter
- Trippie Redd – featured artist, songwriter
- Taz Taylor – producer
- Nick Mira – producer, songwriter
- Dex Duncan – producer
- Koen Heldens – mixing engineer

== Charts ==
=== Weekly charts ===
Chart (2018)	Peak position
Austria (Ö3 Austria Top 40)	69
Canada Hot 100 (Billboard)	31
Czech Republic Singles Digital (ČNS IFPI)	44
Denmark (Tracklisten)	39
Estonia (Eesti Tipp-40)	18
France (SNEP)	70
Hungary (Stream Top 40)	32
Ireland (IRMA)	51
Italy (FIMI)	63
Latvia (DigiTop100)	76
Netherlands (Single Top 100)	45
New Zealand (Recorded Music NZ)	19
Norway (VG-lista)	37
Slovakia Singles Digital (ČNS IFPI)	84
Sweden (Sverigetopplistan)	35
Switzerland (Schweizer Hitparade)	48
UK Singles (Official Charts)	89
UK Indie (Official Charts)	10
UK Hip Hop/R&B (Official Charts)	30
US Billboard Hot 100	28
US Hot R&B/Hip-Hop Songs (Billboard)	18

=== Year-end charts ===
Chart (2017)	Position
US Hot R&B/Hip-Hop Songs (Billboard)	88
US Hot R&B Songs (Billboard)	26

Chart (2018)	Position
Estonia (IFPI)	90
US Hot R&B/Hip-Hop Songs (Billboard)	100
US Hot R&B Songs (Billboard)	26

== Certifications ==
Region	Certification	Certified units/sales
Denmark (IFPI Danmark)	Platinum	90,000^{‡}
France (SNEP)	Diamond	333,333^{‡}
Italy (FIMI)	Platinum	50,000^{‡}
New Zealand (RMNZ)	3× Platinum	90,000^{‡}
Spain (Promusicae)	Platinum	60,000^{‡}
United Kingdom (BPI)	Platinum	600,000^{‡}
United States (RIAA)	11× Platinum	11,000,000^{‡}
^{‡} Sales+streaming figures based on certification alone.

== See also ==
- List of highest-certified digital singles in the United States
