= Billboard Music Award for Top R&B Album =

Annual American music award

This page lists the winners and nominees for the Billboard Music Award for Top R&B Album. This category was one of the first created and has been given out since the award's conception in 1990. Only five artists have won this award twice: Beyoncé, Mary J. Blige, Whitney Houston, Usher and The Weeknd.

== Winners and nominees ==
Winners are listed first and highlighted in bold.

=== 1990s ===
Year	Album	Artist	Ref.
1990	**Rhythm Nation 1814**	**Janet Jackson**	
1991	**I'm Your Baby Tonight**	**Whitney Houston**	
1992	**Forever My Lady**	**Jodeci**	
1993	**The Bodyguard**	**Whitney Houston**	
1994	—N/a		
1995	**My Life**	**Mary J. Blige**	
1995	II	Boyz II Men	
1995	CrazySexyCool	TLC	
1995	Me Against the World	2Pac	
1996	—N/a		
1997	**Life After Death**	**The Notorious B.I.G.**	
1998	**The Miseducation of Lauryn Hill**	**Lauryn Hill**	
1998	Anytime	Brian McKnight	
1998	It's Dark and Hell Is Hot	DMX	
1998	Vol. 2... Hard Knock Life	Jay Z	
1999	**400 Degreez**	**Juvenile**	
1999	Flesh of My Flesh, Blood of My Blood	DMX	
1999	The Miseducation of Lauryn Hill	Lauryn Hill	
1999	R.	R. Kelly	

=== 2000s ===
Year	Album	Artist	Ref.
2000	—N/a		
2001	**TP-2.com**	**R. Kelly**	
2001	Aijuswanaseing	Musiq	
2001	Hot Shot	Shaggy	
2001	Songs in A Minor	Alicia Keys	
2002	**The Eminem Show**	**Eminem**	
2002	Ashanti	Ashanti	
2002	Nellyville	Nelly	
2002	Word of Mouf	Ludacris	
2003	—N/a		
2004	**Confessions**	**Usher**	
2004	The Black Album	Jay Z	
2004	The College Dropout	Kanye West	
2004	The Diary of Alicia Keys	Alicia Keys	
2005	—N/a		
2006	**The Breakthrough**	**Mary J. Blige**	
2006	In My Own Words	Ne-Yo	
2006	King	T.I.	
2006	Unpredictable	Jamie Foxx	
2007 – 09	—N/a		

=== 2010s ===
Year	Album	Artist	Ref.
2010	—N/a		
2011	**Raymond V Raymond**	**Usher**	
2011	Loud	Rihanna	
2011	Passion, Pain & Pleasure	Trey Songz	
2011	Soldier of Love	Sade	
2011	Still Standing	Monica	
2012	**4**	**Beyoncé**	
2012	F.A.M.E.	Chris Brown	
2012	I Remember Me	Jennifer Hudson	
2012	My Life II... The Journey Continues (Act 1)	Mary J. Blige	
2012	Talk That Talk	Rihanna	
2013	**Unapologetic**	**Rihanna**	
2013	Channel Orange	Frank Ocean	
2013	Fortune	Chris Brown	
2013	Girl on Fire	Alicia Keys	
2013	Looking 4 Myself	Usher	
2014	**The 20/20 Experience**	**Justin Timberlake**	
2014	The 20/20 Experience – 2 of 2	Justin Timberlake	
2014	Beyoncé	Beyoncé	
2014	Black Panties	R. Kelly	
2014	Blurred Lines	Robin Thicke	
2015	**Girl**	**Pharrell Williams**	
2015	Beyoncé	Beyoncé	
2015	Love in the Future	John Legend	
2015	X	Chris Brown	
2015	Xscape	Michael Jackson	
2016	**Beauty Behind the Madness**	**The Weeknd**	
2016	Anti	Rihanna	
2016	Black Rose	Tyrese	
2016	Royalty	Chris Brown	
2016	T R A P S O U L	Bryson Tiller	
2017	**Lemonade**	**Beyoncé**	
2017	24K Magic	Bruno Mars	
2017	Anti	Rihanna	
2017	Blonde	Frank Ocean	
2017	Starboy	The Weeknd	
2018	**24K Magic**	**Bruno Mars**	
2018	17	XXXTentacion	
2018	American Teen	Khalid	
2018	Ctrl	SZA	
2018	Starboy	The Weeknd	
2019	**17**	**XXXTentacion**	
2019	Ella Mai	Ella Mai	
2019	My Dear Melancholy	The Weeknd	
2019	H.E.R.	H.E.R.	
2019	American Teen	Khalid	

=== 2020s ===
Year	Album	Artist	Ref.
2020	**Free Spirit**	**Khalid**	
2020	Homecoming: The Live Album	Beyoncé	
2020	Changes	Justin Bieber	
2020	Indigo	Chris Brown	
2020	Over It	Summer Walker	
2021	**After Hours**	**The Weeknd**	
2021	Chilombo	Jhené Aiko	
2021	Slime & B	Chris Brown & Young Thug	
2021	Hot Pink	Doja Cat	
2021	It Was Good Until It Wasn't	Kehlani	
2022	**Planet Her**	**Doja Cat**	
2022	When It's All Said and Done... Take Time	Giveon	
2022	An Evening with Silk Sonic	Silk Sonic	
2022	Still Over It	Summer Walker	
2022	Dawn FM	The Weeknd	
2023	**SOS**	**SZA**	
2023	Renaissance	Beyoncé	
2023	Honestly, Nevermind	Drake	
2023	Wasteland	Brent Faiyaz	
2023	Gemini Rights	Steve Lacy	
2024	**11:11**	**Chris Brown**	
2024	Lager than Life	Brent Faiyaz	
2024	PartyNextDoor 4	PartyNextDoor	
2024	Bryson Tiller	Bryson Tiller	
2024	Tyla	Tyla	

== Multiple wins and nominations ==
=== Wins ===
Rank	Artist	Awards won	Years won
1	Beyoncé	2	2012 and 2017
1	Mary J. Blige	2	1995 and 2006
1	Whitney Houston	2	1991 and 1993
1	Usher	2	2004 and 2011
1	The Weeknd	2	2016 and 2021

=== Nominations ===
Winning years are highlighted in bold.

Rank	Artist	Nominations	Years
1	Chris Brown	7	2012, 2013, 2015, 2016, 2020, 2021 and **2024**
2	Beyoncé	6	**2012**, 2014, 2015, **2017**, 2020 and 2021
2	The Weeknd	6	**2016**, 2017, 2018, 2019, **2021** and 2022
3	Rihanna	5	2011, 2012, **2013**, 2016 and 2017
5	Mary J. Blige	3	**1995**, **2006** and 2012
5	Alicia Keys	3	2001, 2004 and 2013
5	R. Kelly	3	1999, **2001** and 2014
5	Khalid	3	2018, 2019 and **2020**
5	Usher	3	**2004**, **2011** and 2013
5	DMX	2	1998 and 1999
5	Doja Cat	2	2021 and **2022**
5	Lauryn Hill	2	**1998** and 1999
5	Whitney Houston	2	**1991** and **1993**
5	Jay Z	2	1998 and 2004
5	Bruno Mars	2	2017 and **2018**
5	Frank Ocean	2	2013 and 2017
5	SZA	2	2018 and **2023**
5	Justin Timberlake	2	**2014** and 2014
5	XXXTentacion	2	2018 and **2019**
5	Brent Faiyaz	2	2023 and 2024
5	Bryson Tiller	2	2016 and 2024
