= Hold You (album) =

Studio album by Gyptian
- Released: July 19, 2010
- Recorded: 2009–2010
- Genre: Dancehall; reggae; lovers rock
- Label: VP Records

Gyptian chronology
Revelations (2010)	Hold You (2010)	Sex, Love & Reggae (2013)

Singles from Hold You
- 1. "Hold You" Released: November 7, 2010

Hold You is the third album by Jamaican reggae singer Gyptian. The album was released on 25 October 2010 by CD and 12 October by Digital download.

== Singles ==
- "Hold You" was the first single released from the album, it released on the 7 November 2010 in the UK. The song has reached #69 in Canada, #77 in the United States and #16 on the UK Singles Chart.

== Track listing ==
No.	Title	Length
1.	"Prelude TBH (To Be Held)"	1:02
2.	"Beautiful Lady"	3:44
3.	"Call Gyptian"	3:24
4.	"All In You"	3:12
5.	"Hold You"	3:52
6.	"Nah Let Go"	3:19
7.	"Tease Me (Haffi Easy)"	3:03
8.	"L.U=V.E"	1:55
9.	"Rendezvous"	3:44
10.	"So Much In Love"	3:57
11.	"Na Na Na (A Love Song)"	3:58
12.	"Drive Me Crazy"	3:01
13.	"Where You Belong"	5:28
14.	"Leave Us Alone"	3:58
15.	"Selah"	3:46
16.	"Hold You" (Remix) (featuring Nicki Minaj)	4:14

== Chart performance ==
Chart (2010)	Peak position
US Billboard 200	186
US Billboard R&B/Hip-Hop Albums	34
US Billboard Heatseekers Albums	6
US Billboard Reggae Albums	2
US Billboard Tropical Albums	39

== Release history ==
Region	Date	Format	Label
United Kingdom	July 19, 2010	CD	VP Records
United Kingdom	August 12, 2010	Digital download	VP Records
United States	July 20, 2010	CD	VP Records
