= Hold You (Gyptian song) =

Single by Gyptian

from the album Hold You
- Released: 24 July 2010
- Recorded: 2009
- Genre: Dancehall; reggae fusion
- Length: 3:52 (album version); 3:12 (new edit)
- Label: VP; Columbia
- Songwriters: Windel B. Edwards; Ricardo Johnson
- Producer: Ricky Blaze

Gyptian singles chronology
"Hold You" (2010)	"Nah Let Go" (2011)

"Hold You" or "Hold Yuh" is a song by Jamaican singer and songwriter Gyptian from the album Hold You. It was released on 24 July 2010 in the United States and was released in the United Kingdom on 7 November 2010. The song peaked at number 77 on the Billboard Hot 100, number 16 on the UK Singles Chart and number 69 on the Canadian Hot 100.

In June 2013, the song was certified Gold in the United States by the RIAA after achieving sales of 500,000. In 2017, the song was included on Billboard's 12 Best Dancehall & Reggaeton Choruses of the 21st Century at number six. In October 2018, the song was certified Platinum in the United Kingdom by the BPI after achieving sales of 600,000. Jamaican singer Heavy Noni sampled it for his 2019 song My Goody.

== Remix ==
=== Nicki Minaj remix ===
The official remix for the song features rapper Nicki Minaj. It spent 29 weeks on the Billboard Hot R&B/Hip-Hop Songs and 15 weeks on the Billboard Hot 100. Minaj has performed her verse on select dates of her debut concert tour, the Pink Friday Tour. She has also performed her verse on her Pink Friday: Reloaded Tour, on The Pinkprint Tour and on The Nicki Wrld Tour.

=== Other remixes ===
There is also a remix with the artist Don Omar and artist Natti Natasha, released as a remix in Latin version, this was released on 10 December 2010.

Foxy Brown visited the UK version of the song.

== Track listing ==
UK digital download
No.	Title	Length
1.	"Hold You" (UK Radio Edit)	2:47
2.	"Hold You" (Major Lazer Edit)	2:44
3.	"Hold You" (Shy FX and Benny Page Digital Soundboy Remix)	5:29
4.	"Hold You" (Toddla T Remix featuring D Double E)	4:12
5.	"Hold You" (Original Edit)	3:54

== Chart performance ==
=== Weekly charts ===
Chart (2010–11)	Peak position
Belgium (Ultratop 50 Flanders)	31
Belgium (Ultratip Bubbling Under Wallonia)	27
Canada Hot 100 (Billboard)	69
Canada CHR/Top 40 (Billboard)	48
European Hot 100	54
France (SNEP)	45
UK Singles (Official Charts)	16
US Billboard Hot 100	77
US Dance Airplay (Billboard)	21
US Hot R&B/Hip-Hop Songs (Billboard)	31
US Rhythmic Airplay (Billboard)	30

=== Year-end charts ===
Chart (2010)	Position
UK Singles (OCC)	178
US Hot R&B/Hip-Hop Songs (Billboard)	74
Chart (2011)	Position
UK Singles (OCC)	177

== Certifications ==
Region	Certification	Certified units/sales
United Kingdom (BPI)	2× Platinum	1,200,000^{‡}
^{‡} Sales+streaming figures based on certification alone.

== Release history ==
Region	Date	Format	Label
United States	July 24, 2010	Digital download	VP; Columbia
United Kingdom	November 7, 2010	Digital download	Sony
