= ProudCatOwnerRemix =

2019 single by XXXTentacion featuring Rico Nasty

Single by XXXTentacion featuring Rico Nasty

from the album ? (anniversary deluxe)
- Released: August 20, 2019
- Recorded: 2017–2018
- Genre: SoundCloud rap; hip-hop
- Length: 2:37
- Label: Bad Vibes Forever; Caroline
- Songwriters: Jahseh Onfroy; Maria-Cecilia Simone Kelly; Ronald Spence Jr.
- Producer: Ronny J

XXXTentacion featuring Rico Nasty singles chronology
"Royalty" (2019)	"ProudCatOwnerRemix" (2019)	"Hearteater" (2019)

"ProudCatOwnerRemix" (stylized as #PROUDCATOWNERREMIX) is a song by American rapper XXXTentacion featuring fellow American rapper Rico Nasty. This track was released on August 20, 2019, as the lead single for the deluxe anniversary edition of ?.

The song was written by XXXTentacion, Rico Nasty and Ronny J and produced by Ronny J.

== Background ==
The track is a remix of the song "#PROUDCATOWNER #IHATERAPPERS #IEATPUSSY" released exclusively on SoundCloud on December 25, 2017.

XXXTentacion mainly raps about sexual intercourse and makes several references to cartoon characters, world leaders, and movie characters. Rico Nasty mainly raps about drugs, money, and expensive items.

== Reception ==
The original version of the song was described by XXL as one of X's "best deep cuts".

XXL described Rico Nasty's newly added verse on the remix as "hyperactive" and noted that it was the same lyrics as her 2019 XXL Freshman Cypher freestyle. The publication also included the track on their "The 13 Best New Songs This Week" article in 2019.

== Personnel ==
Credits adapted from Apple Music.

- Jahseh Onfroy – vocals, songwriter
- Maria-Cecilia Simone Kelly – vocals, songwriter
- Ronald Spence Jr. – songwriter, producer
- Koen Heldens – mixing engineer
- Brandon Brown – assistant mixing engineer
- Gary "Munch" Clark – assistant mixing engineer
- Dave Kutch – mastering engineer
- Kevin Peterson – assistant mastering engineer

== Charts ==
Chart performance for "ProudCatOwnerRemix"
Chart (2025)	Peak position
New Zealand Hot Singles (RMNZ)	25
