= Bad Vibes Forever (song) =

Single by XXXTentacion featuring PnB Rock and Trippie Redd

from the album Bad Vibes Forever
- Released: November 22, 2019
- Genre: Alternative R&B
- Length: 2:30
- Label: Bad Vibes Forever; Empire
- Songwriters: Jahseh Onfroy; John Cunningham; Michael White II; Rakim Allen; Robert Soukiasyan
- Producer: Cunningham

XXXTentacion singles chronology
| "Hearteater" (2019) | "Bad Vibes Forever" (2019) | "Riot" (2020) |

PnB Rock singles chronology
| "Fendi" (2019) | "Bad Vibes Forever" (2019) | "Ordinary" (2020) |

Trippie Redd singles chronology
| "Who Needs Love" (2019) | "Bad Vibes Forever" (2019) | "No Rap Kap" (2020) |

Music video
- "bad vibes forever" on YouTube

"Bad Vibes Forever" (stylized in lowercase) is a song by American rapper and singer XXXTentacion featuring fellow American rappers and singers PnB Rock and Trippie Redd. Produced by John Cunningham, it was released on November 22, 2019, as the third and final single from XXXTentacion's fourth and final studio album of the same name. It was also briefly on Redd's mixtape A Love Letter to You 4 before being taken off.

== Charts ==
| Chart (2019–2020) | Peak position |
|---|---|
| Canada Hot 100 (Billboard) | 85 |
| New Zealand Hot Singles (Recorded Music NZ) | 10 |
| US Billboard Hot 100 | 85 |
| US Hot R&B/Hip-Hop Songs (Billboard) | 39 |

== Certifications ==
| Region | Certification | Certified units/sales |
|---|---|---|
| New Zealand (RMNZ) | Gold | 15,000^{‡} |
| United Kingdom (BPI) | Silver | 200,000^{‡} |
^{‡} Sales+streaming figures based on certification alone.
