= Kemba (rapper) =

American rapper

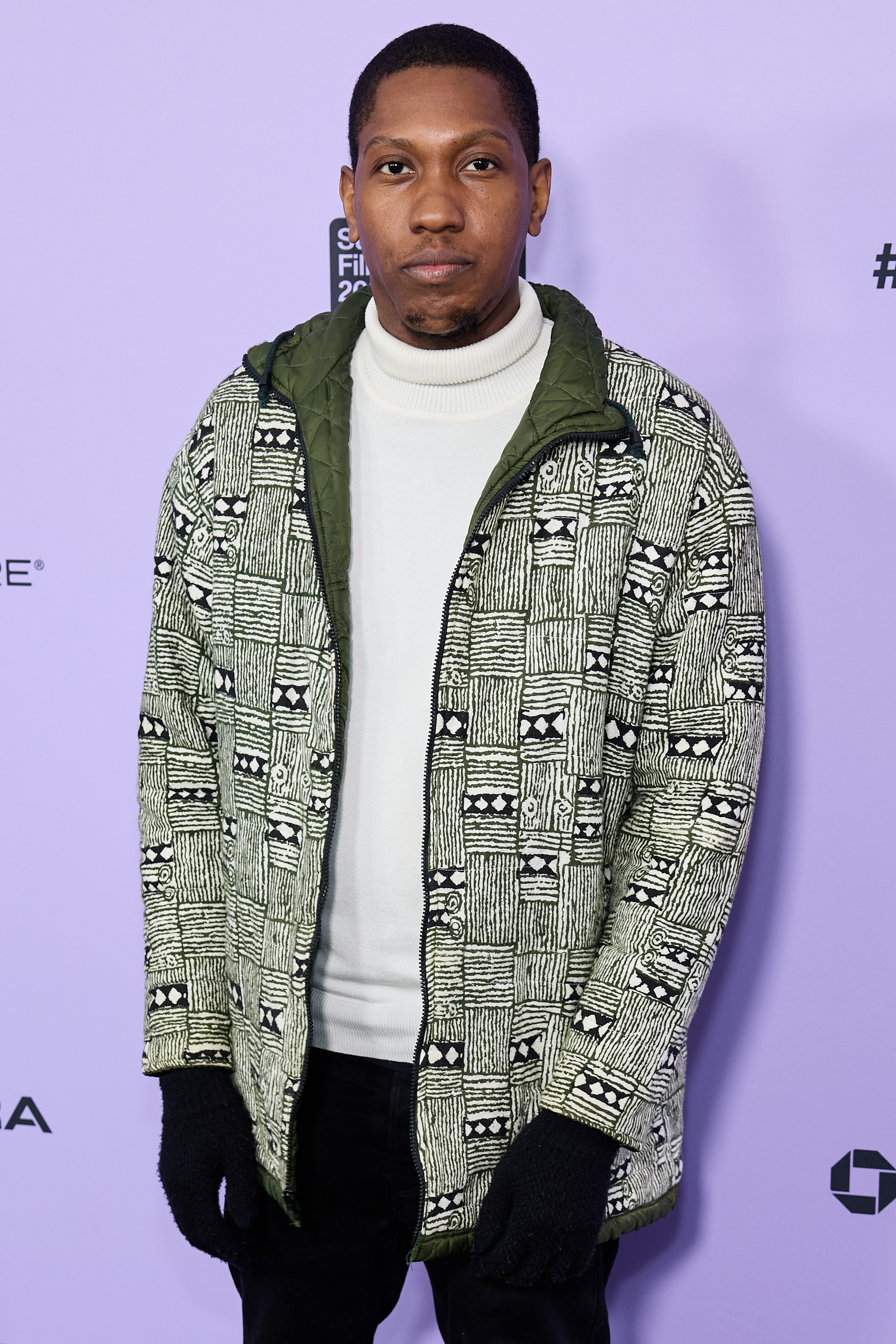
- Kemba at the 2024 Sundance Film Festival

Background information
- Also known as: YC the Cynic
- Born: Matthew Jefferson; October 21, 1990 (age 36)
- Origin: Hunts Point, Bronx, New York
- Genre: Hip hop
- Occupation: Rapper
- Instrument: Vocals
- Years active: 2010–present
- Website: kembaland.com

Matthew Jefferson, also known as Kemba, formerly known as YC the Cynic, (born November 21, 1990) is an American rapper from Hunts Point, Bronx, New York. He was named one of the "Top 5 Underground Hip-Hop Artists in New York" by Deli Magazine (2010) and was ordained "DXNext" by the hip hop website HipHopDX (2011). Kemba talks openly about his sense of responsibility to the art form, “It feels like there’s a void in the Bronx, and I don’t necessarily feel like I have to fill it, but I feel like I could." He was also a feature on XXXTENTACION's final posthumous album, Bad Vibes Forever.

== Musical career ==
You're Welcome (2010)

Released on February 9, 2010, You're Welcome is YC The Cynic's musical debut. Featuring mostly covers of 1990s classics, You're Welcome was an act of homage to those that paved the way for him. Justin Hunte of BrooklynBodega described You're Welcome as being “loaded with personality, slick wordplay, pristine beat selection, and lyricism beyond his years.” Manny Faces of Birthplace Magazine said "lyrically, YC is intelligent and rocks with diction. He enunciates well, emitting just the right amount of emotion for each track, while skillfully staying on message." DJBooth.net declared “YC’s heavily-alliterated, elaborately-rhymed flows are undeniably dope.” You're Welcome served as a great look into the talent and potential of the up-and-coming emcee.

Fall FWD (2011)

Released on March 1, 2011, Fall FWD is the second mixtape by YC the Cynic. Containing mostly original production, Fall FWD shows the growth and song-writing ability of the young artist. Derick Fortin of LA2Day said "Fall FWD’s lyrical complexity, aesthetically pleasing flow, diverse subjects, and experimental production is everything true hip-hop fans have been looking for" while JT Langley of Oology says "lyrical content aside, YC shares himself as a patient slow-paced linguist throughout the tape, focusing with precision to weave commentary among clever metaphor, while riding a loose rhyme-scheme that holds the ability to evolve smoothly at the turn of each verse without any obvious signifiers."

After the success of Fall FWD, YC the Cynic has performed with the stage with the likes of Bun B, Curren$y, Joell Ortiz, Kendrick Lamar, Mac Miller, and Big Sean and most notably, a headline show for his most recent release, Fall FWD, at Southpaw in Park Slope, Brooklyn. He also performed at the closing ceremony of Fat Beats in NYC. In March 2011, YC the Cynic wrapped a nationwide tour with J.Live that included six performances at the SXSW Festival in Austin, Texas. YC's artist resume includes features in OkayPlayer, AllHipHop, ACT LIVE MUSIC, 2dopeboyz and OK-Tho whom named him one of the Top 25 artists of 2013.

GNK (2013)

Released on August 26, 2013, GNK is the last project released under the name YC the Cynic. GNK is a collaborative project with Frank Drake (Producer).

NEGUS (2016)

Under his new name, Kemba released the album Negus on June 30, 2016. In December 2016, Kemba was interviewed by Peter Rosenberg on Real Late W/ Peter Rosenberg. Only nine days after the interview was uploaded to YouTube, Kendrick Lamar invited Kemba on to the stage to rap at Brooklyn's Music Hall of Williamsburg for an American Express sponsored concert that was live-streamed on Facebook. On December 27, 2016, Kemba uploaded a video onto Instagram showing him on the set for Anderson .Paak's "Already" music video. On December 28, 2016, rumors began to surface that Kemba had signed to Top Dawg Entertainment. In 2019, he was featured on the final posthumous album from the late Floridian rapper XXXTENTACION, Bad Vibes Forever, with fellow New York native, Joey Badass.

GILDA (2019)

In 2019, Kemba released Gilda, his major label debut. The album is named for, and is a tribute to, Kemba's mother, who died two years prior to the album's release.

In 2020, Kemba appeared as himself in the film The 40-Year-Old Version. In 2020, Kemba's music video ''Nobody I Can Trust'' directed by Tomson Tee won the Best Narrative category and placed second for the Best Music Video at the Berlin Music Video Awards.

== Rebel Diaz Arts Collective ==
In addition, YC the Cynic is a founding member of the RDACBX, Rebel Diaz Arts Collective. Created in March 2009 by the hip hop duo Rebel Diaz, the Rebel Diaz Arts Collective (RDACBX) is a hip hop community center that utilizes all five elements to spread their message about the injustices faced by oppressed groups while providing a safe haven for young people to perform and learn. Some of the RDACBX's resources include a performance space, a multimedia studio, a computer lab, and an art gallery. In "building community through the arts," RDACBX serves as a safe space for young people to learn and perform, hosting workshops in addition to providing artistic space. YC describes his participation in the collective: "We’ve been doing rallies, which are all based on music, but it’s so much deeper. Music is just an acceptable form…it’s inspirational. We use that to better the community and the world at large." In June 2010, along with RDACBX, YC the Cynic toured California, and Detroit, for the United States Social Forum.

== Influences ==
YC The Cynic has openly stated his influences and how they influence him. "I study specific emcees for specific reasons. Like, I've the [sic] importance of enunciation is huge. I look to KRS-One for that." He has also said that he looked to Eminem for multi-syllabic rhythmic patters and "inners," which are rhymes in the beginning or middle of a line. Although KRS-One and Eminem have influenced him, he's also named Mos Def and Andre 3000 as well, with his biggest influence being Cee-Lo Green of Goodie Mob and Gnarls Barkley. "Cee-lo use of melody, song-writing ability, and just the strength and feeling of the words he chooses is pretty invaluable," says the Bronx native.

YC the Cynic has been lauded by some of the most notable names in the hip hop industry. In his "DXNext" feature, the writer described him as being "a standout in the cutthroat New York City underground scene." Brooklyn Bodega described YC as being “loaded with personality, slick wordplay, pristine beat selection, and lyricism beyond his years” while DJBooth.net declares “YC’s heavily-alliterated, elaborately-rhymed flows are undeniably dope.”

== Discography ==
- GNK (2013) (as YC the Cynic)
- Negus (2016)
- Gilda (2019)
