= Royalty (XXXTentacion song) =

2019 single by XXXTentacion featuring Ky-Mani Marley, Stefflon Don, and Vybz Kartel

Single by XXXTentacion featuring Ky-Mani Marley, Stefflon Don, and Vybz Kartel

from the album Bad Vibes Forever
- Released: July 19, 2019
- Recorded: 2018–2019
- Genre: Dancehall; hip hop; R&B
- Length: 3:24
- Label: Bad Vibes Forever; Empire
- Songwriters: Jahseh Onfroy; Stephanie Allen; John Crawford; Josh Humber; Ky-Mani Marley
- Producer: JonFX

XXXTentacion singles chronology
| "Run It Back!" (2019) | "Royalty" (2019) | "ProudCatOwnerRemix" (2019) |

Ky-Mani Marley singles chronology
| "Chillax" (2015) | "Royalty" (2019) | "Yayo" (2019) |

Stefflon Don singles chronology
| "Scared of Love" (2019) | "Royalty" (2019) | "47" (2019) |

"Royalty" is a song by American rapper and singer XXXTentacion featuring British rapper Stefflon Don and Jamaican musicians Ky-Mani Marley and Vybz Kartel. Written alongside producer JonFX, it was released on July 19, 2019 as the lead single from the former's fourth and final studio album, Bad Vibes Forever.

== Background ==
About five months before XXXTentacion's death, X had posted on his Instagram story that he would be collaborating on a song with Vybz Kartel. After X's death, his mother, Cleopatra Bernard announced on Instagram that the song "Royalty" would be released on July 19, 2019, with additional features from Ki-Mani Marley and Stefflon Don. It was originally reported by the Los Angeles Times that the single would be on the upcoming deluxe version of X's sophomore album, ?, but it was instead released on his fourth studio album, Bad Vibes Forever.

== Personnel ==
- XXXTentacion – songwriting, composition
- Ky-Mani Marley – songwriting, composition
- Stefflon Don – songwriting, composition
- Vybz Kartel – songwriting, composition
- JonFX – songwriting, composition, production
- Koen Heldens – mixing
- Kevin Peterson – mastering
- Dave Kutch – mastering

== Charts ==
Weekly chart performance for "Royalty"
| Chart (2019) | Peak position |
|---|---|
| New Zealand Hot Singles (RMNZ) | 8 |
