= Voss (song) =

2018 song by XXXTentacion featuring Sauce Walka and Gordo

- 2018 single artwork

Song by XXXTentacion featuring Sauce Walka and Gordo

from the album Drip God and Bad Vibes Forever
- Released: August 2018 (Sauce Walka self-release); December 6, 2019 (Empire re-release)
- Recorded: 2017
- Genre: Hip hop
- Length: 1:47
- Label: Bad Vibes Forever; Empire
- Songwriters: Jahseh Onfroy; Albert Walker Mondane; Diamante Anthony Blackmon
- Producer: Gordo

"Voss" is a song by American rapper XXXTentacion featuring fellow American rapper Sauce Walka and record producer Gordo (formerly known as Carnage). It was first released as a standalone digital single, before being included shortly after on Sauce Walka's mixtape Drip God, released on August 31, 2018. The song was later removed from streaming services.

It was re-released on December 6, 2019, as part of XXXTentacion's fourth and final posthumous studio album, Bad Vibes Forever, released through Bad Vibes Forever and Empire Distribution.

== Promotion and release ==
"Voss" was among the earliest posthumous XXXTentacion collaborations released after his death.

On August 29, 2018, Gordo previewed "Voss" on social media ahead of the commercial release of Drip God. Although the mixtape was scheduled for release on August 31, 2018, XXL reported that it had already appeared on Amazon Music on August 7 and on LiveMixtapes on August 20.

== Composition ==
XXL described the track as a bass-heavy production by Gordo, with XXXTentacion performing the chorus and Sauce Walka delivering the verses. Its lyrics focus on themes of luxury, wealth, and status, including a comparison between the clarity of diamonds and Voss, a bottled water brand. Sauce Walka's verses explore themes of opulence, style, and Southern hip hop imagery.

Pitchfork wrote that "Voss" more closely resembles a Sauce Walka song than an XXXTentacion track, attributing this to Sauce Walka's dominant stylistic presence and the song's origins on his 2018 mixtape Drip God.

== Personnel ==
Credits adapted from Apple Music.

- Jahseh Onfroy – vocals, songwriter
- Albert Walker Mondane – vocals, songwriter
- Diamante Anthony Blackmon – songwriter, producer
- Koen Heldens – mixing engineer
- Sauce Miyagi – mixing engineer
- Dave Kutch – mastering engineer
- Kevin Peterson – assistant mastering engineer
- Billy Hickey – engineer
- Yang Tan – engineer
