= Let's Pretend We're Numb =

2023 single by XXXTentacion

Single by XXXTentacion
- Released: December 28, 2015 (SoundCloud); May 26, 2023 (Columbia re-release)
- Recorded: 2015
- Genre: EDM trap; emo rap
- Length: 1:20
- Label: Bad Vibes Forever; Columbia
- Songwriter(s): Jahseh Onfroy
- Producer(s): Khaed Moulton

XXXTentacion singles chronology
"I'm Not Human" (2023)	"Let's Pretend We're Numb" (2023)	"Emoji" (2023)

"Let's Pretend We're Numb" (stylized in all lowercase) is a song by American rapper XXXTentacion. It was originally released on SoundCloud on December 28, 2015, before being re-released posthumously for streaming services on May 26, 2023. The song was produced by Khaed. Prior to its re-release, it was described as one of X's "best deep cuts". It heavily samples the song "Someone Out Of Town" by Yuna.

== Background ==
"Let's Pretend We're Numb" was one of XXXTentacion's earlier songs released on SoundCloud. It was announced by X's estate that the track would be made available to streaming services such as Spotify and Apple Music on May 24, 2023. It is the first song released by X's estate since the conclusion of the trial for the murder of X in April 2023. The producer of the song, Khaed, died in 2019.
