= I'm Not Human =

Single by XXXTentacion and Lil Uzi Vert
- Released: January 23, 2023
- Recorded: May 2018; 2022
- Genre: Emo folk
- Length: 4:01 (original); 3:15 (re-release)
- Label: Bad Vibes Forever; Columbia
- Songwriters: Jahseh Onfroy; Symere Woods; John Cunningham
- Producers: XXXTentacion; Cunningham

XXXTentacion singles chronology
"Very Rare Forever Freestyle" (2022)	"I'm Not Human" (2023)	"Let's Pretend We're Numb" (2023)

Lil Uzi Vert singles chronology
"spend the money" (2022)	"I'm Not Human" (2023)	"Win a Lot" (2023)

"I'm Not Human" is a song by American rappers XXXTentacion and Lil Uzi Vert. It was originally released on SoundCloud and YouTube on January 23, 2023 on what would have been XXXTentacion's 25th birthday. The single was released on all streaming platforms on June 18, 2023, the fifth anniversary of X's murder.

== Background ==
On January 22, 2023, XXXTentacion's estate announced on his social media that the posthumous single "I'm Not Human" featuring Lil Uzi Vert would be released the next day, January 23, 2023, which would have been X's 25th birthday. The song features an acoustic background with X and Lil Uzi Vert singing about their sentimental emotions and how they feel that their feelings are obscure to others. In 2021, when Lil Uzi Vert was asked why they had never worked on a posthumous collaboration with X, they stated,

"I'd love to do a song with [X], but I'm really weird on stuff like that. Don’t get me wrong, it took me really long to do that with another artist. I'm really weird because I understand that they're not here living and what if that's not the vision they really want? Especially if they really fucked with me. What if that's all wrong, I'd be pissed off if like they did it all wrong and I'm not here. But you know, if it works out, it works out."

— Lil Uzi Vert

Lil Uzi Vert stated in 2022 that while X was alive, they saw X as their "only competition".

On January 24, 2023, the song was removed by XXXTentacion's estate due to sampling reasons, as they had not gotten the clearance for X's sample of "Snuff" by Slipknot. Five months later on June 15, 2023, the estate announced that "I'm Not Human" would be released on all streaming platforms on June 18, 2023, exactly the fifth anniversary of X's death.

== Personnel ==
Credits adapted from Genius.

- XXXTentacion – artist, songwriter
- Lil Uzi Vert – artist, songwriter
- John Cunningham – songwriter, producer

== Charts ==
Chart performance for "I'm Not Human"
Chart (2023)	Peak position
New Zealand Hot Singles (RMNZ)	21
