= Run It Back! =

Single by Craig Xen and XXXTentacion

from the EP Broken Kids Club
- Released: June 11, 2019
- Recorded: 2017
- Genre: Screamo; trap metal; hardcore hip hop
- Length: 2:06
- Label: Empire; Cruel World
- Songwriters: Jahseh Onfroy; Craig Gordwin
- Producers: DJ Patt; STAIN

XXXTentacion singles chronology
"Bad!" (2018)	"Run It Back!" (2019)	"Royalty" (2019)

Craig Xen singles chronology
"Stain" (2018)	"Run It Back!" (2019)

Music video
- "Run It Back!" on YouTube

"Run It Back!" is a song by American rappers Craig Xen and XXXTentacion. The song was released as a single for Craig Xen's 2019 EP Broken Kids Club. It was produced by DJ Patt and STAIN. It was the last single released by Craig Xen before his retirement, however, he returned to music in 2024.

== Background ==
"Run It Back!" was first previewed in November 2017. Craig Xen described the track and part of XXXTentacion's "half-blonde era" when X had his previous split dye hairstyle in July 2016 to September 2017, just two months before the preview for "Run It Back!". The song was leaked online on May 26, 2019 and was released officially as a single on June 11, 2019. Billboard described the single as a screamo track.
