= Bad Vibes Forever =

Studio album by XXXTentacion
- Released: December 6, 2019
- Recorded: 2014–2019
- Genres: Hip hop; alternative R&B; emo rap
- Length: 57:24
- Labels: Bad Vibes Forever; Empire
- Producers: DJ Carnage; John Cunningham; JonFX; Ronny J; XXXTentacion; Robert Soukasyan; XXYYXX; Jasper Sheff; Mally Mall; Paul Judge; Killstation; Chanslin

XXXTentacion chronology
Members Only, Vol. 4 (2019)	Bad Vibes Forever (2019)	Look at Me: The Album (2022)

Singles from Bad Vibes Forever
- 1. "Royalty" Released: July 19, 2019; 2. "Hearteater" Released: October 22, 2019; 3. "Bad Vibes Forever" Released: November 22, 2019

Bad Vibes Forever is the fourth and final studio album by American rapper XXXTentacion. It was released through Bad Vibes Forever and Empire Distribution on December 6, 2019. The production was handled by XXXTentacion himself, alongside DJ Carnage, John Cunningham, JonFX, Ronny J, XXYYXX, and among others. The album features a wide range of guest appearances from artists including PnB Rock, Trippie Redd, Lil Wayne, Rick Ross, Killstation, Noah Cyrus, Tom G, Tory Lanez, Mavado, Craig Xen, Kemba, Joey Badass, Sauce Walka, Carnage, Ky-Mani Marley, Stefflon Don, Vybz Kartel, Jimmy Levy, Joyner Lucas, Ikabod Veins, and Blink-182. The album serves as a follow-up to his first posthumous album and third studio album, Skins (2018).

Bad Vibes Forever was supported by three singles – "Royalty", "Hearteater", and "Bad Vibes Forever". Bad Vibes Forever received mixed reviews from critics and debuted at number five on the US Billboard 200, earning 65,000 album-equivalent units.

== Background ==
Bad Vibes Forever was initially planned as XXXTentacion's debut album, with a slated release date of October 31, 2016. In a March 2017 interview, XXXTentacion stated he was working on Bad Vibes Forever alongside 17. 17 was released as his debut album in August 2017, followed by the EP A Ghetto Christmas Carol in December. That same month, XXXTentacion announced that his next three albums would be titled ?, Skins, and Bad Vibes Forever.

XXXTentacion's second studio album ? was released in March 2018, the last project he released before being murdered in June 2018. His first posthumous album, Skins, was released in December 2018. On the anniversary of his murder, his estate announced an upcoming album and documentary planned for the year. Billboard confirmed the album's title as Bad Vibes Forever in August 2019, with a slated release for fall 2019. The album was reported to feature guest appearances from Stefflon Don, Lil Wayne, Lil Nas X, Trippie Redd, Rick Ross, Joey Badass and more. However, the song featuring Lil Nas X would later be scrapped; stating that the fans didn't want it at first, it was because of one of Lil Nas X's tweets from his old Twitter account. But it was resolved, right around the corner from the release of the album. On August 25, 2019, the songs "Hearteater" and "School Shooters (ft. Lil Wayne)" were confirmed for the album.

On November 12, 2019, a teaser for the album and XXXTentacion's clothing line, also titled Bad Vibes Forever, was released through his Instagram story. In the video, the album was presented as "the final album".

On November 20, 2019, the album's cover art was teased on social media by XXXTentacion's mother who stated that the album would be "coming soon". A followup album trailer revealed the release date for December 6, 2019.

== Promotion ==
"Royalty", featuring Ky-Mani Marley, Stefflon Don and Vybz Kartel, was released on July 19, 2019, as the album's lead single.

"Hearteater", originally a scrapped track from ?, was teased on October 18, 2019, with a picture of XXXTentacion's ex-girlfriend, Geneva Ayala, eating a bloody heart. The single was officially released on October 22, 2019. A music video for the track was also announced, and features Ayala, who had previously accused the rapper of domestic abuse. The music video was released on October 25, 2019.

The album's title track, featuring Trippie Redd and PnB Rock, was released on November 22, 2019, following a teaser video released the day before. The teaser video showed the two artists, as well as Billie Eilish and Lil Skies, recounting the impact XXXTentacion had on their lives, with Eilish referring to the artist as "a beam of light [that] tried to do everything for other people".

== Critical reception ==
Professional ratings
Aggregate scores
Source	Rating
Metacritic	55/100
Review scores
Source	Rating
AllMusic	2.5/5 stars
HipHopDX	3/5 stars
NME	3/5 stars
Pitchfork	3.5/10
RapReviews	7.5/10

Bad Vibes Forever was met with mixed reviews by music critics. According to Metacritic, which calculated a score of 55 based on six reviews, the album received "mixed or average reviews". Kyann-Sian Williams, writing for NME, called the album "slightly better than last year's Skins but a serious case of over-embellishing thin material".

== Commercial performance ==
Bad Vibes Forever debuted at number five on the US Billboard 200 with 65,000 album-equivalent units.

== Track listing ==
Track listing adapted from Tidal.

No.	Title	Writer(s)	Producer(s)	Length
1.	"Introduction"	Jahseh Onfroy	John Cunningham; XXXTentacion	1:43
2.	"Ex Bitch"	Onfroy; Cunningham	Cunningham	2:01
3.	"Ugly"	Onfroy	XXXTentacion	1:31
4.	"Bad Vibes Forever" (featuring PnB Rock and Trippie Redd)	Onfroy; Cunningham; Michael L. White; Rakim Allen; Robert Soukiasyan	Cunningham	2:30
5.	"School Shooters" (featuring Lil Wayne)	Dwayne Michael Carter, Jr.; Onfroy; Jasper Sheff; Cunningham	Sheff; Cunningham	1:33
6.	"I Changed Her Life" (featuring Rick Ross)	Onfroy; Cunningham; William L. Roberts II	Cunningham	1:48
7.	"Triumph"	Onfroy; Cunningham	Cunningham	2:46
8.	"Limbo" (featuring Killstation)	Onfroy; Nolan Santana; Paul Judge	Judge; Killstation	3:14
9.	"Before I Realize"	Onfroy; Cunningham; Soukiasyan	Cunningham; Soukiasyan	1:34
10.	"Ecstasy" (featuring Noah Cyrus)	Anneka Warburton; Onfroy; Marcel Everett	XXXTentacion; XXYYXX	4:00
11.	"Kill My Vibe" (featuring Tom G)	Andre Lyon; Onfroy; Sheff; Cunningham; John Rodriguez; Marcello Valenzano; Ted Kay; Thomas L. Godbolt	Sheff; Cunningham	2:08
12.	"Hot Gyal" (featuring Tory Lanez and Mavado)	David C. Brooks; Daystar Peterson; Onfroy; Jamal Rashid; John Crawford	JonFX; Mally Mall	2:14
13.	"The Only Time I Feel Alive" (with Craig Xen)	Craig Xen; Onfroy; Sheff; Cunningham	Sheff; Cunningham	2:43
14.	"The Interlude That Never Ends"	Onfroy	XXXTentacion	2:28
15.	"Daemons" (with Kemba featuring Joey Badass)	Chanslin; Onfroy; Jo Vaugn Virginie; Matthew Jefferson	Chanslin	2:52
16.	"Attention!"	Onfroy; Cunningham	Cunningham	2:00
17.	"Eat It Up"	Onfroy; Ronald Spence, Jr.	Ronny J	1:45
18.	"Voss" (featuring Sauce Walka and Carnage)	Albert Walker Mondane; Diamanté A. Blackmon; Onfroy	Carnage	1:47
19.	"Royalty" (featuring Ky-Mani Marley, Stefflon Don, and Vybz Kartel)	Adidja Palmer; Onfroy; Crawford; Josh Humber; Ky-Mani Marley; Stephanie Allen	JonFX	3:23
20.	"Wanna Grow Old (I Won't Let Go)" (featuring Jimmy Levy)	Onfroy; Jimmy Levy; Cunningham; Soukiasyan	Cunningham	2:11
21.	"Hearteater"	Onfroy; Cunningham; Soukiasyan	Cunningham; Soukiasyan	2:16
22.	"Northstar Remix" (featuring Joyner Lucas)	Gary M. Lucas, Jr.; Onfroy; Rashid; Spence, Jr.	Mally Mall; Ronny J	2:46
23.	"Chase/Glass Shards" (featuring Ikabod Veins)	Onfroy; Jordan Aristides Serin	XXXTentacion	2:18
24.	"Numb the Pain"	Onfroy; Cunningham	Cunningham; XXXTentacion	1:22
25.	"It's All Fading to Black" (featuring Blink-182)	Onfroy; Cunningham; Mark Hoppus	Cunningham	2:32
Total length:				57:28

Notes

- "Bad Vibes Forever" briefly appeared on the mixtape A Love Letter to You 4 by Trippie Redd.
- "Introduction", "Bad Vibes Forever", "Before I Realize", "The Interlude That Never Ends", "Wanna Grow Old (I Won't Let Go)", and "Numb the Pain" are stylized in all lowercase.
- "Ugly", "Limbo", "The Only Time I Feel Alive", "Attention!", "Hearteater", and "It's All Fading to Black" are stylized in all caps.
- "Chase / Glass Shards" is stylized as "CHASE / glass shards".
- "Daemons" is a remix of an earlier XXXTentacion song which is titled "Angel 2 Demons" which was further a re-recorded version of another XXXTentacion song titled "Who the Fuck is God?" and originally featured J Soul.
- "Ecstasy" is a reproduction of an earlier XXXTentacion song of the same name.
- "Voss" is a re-release with different credentials. It was Sauce Walka's "Voss featuring XXXTentacion". and was on his album Drip God. Carnage only took producer credits.
- "Northstar (Remix)" is a remix of an earlier XXXTentacion song named Shining Like The Northstar and has a new beat from Mally Mall and Ronny J.

== Personnel ==
Credits adapted from AllMusic.

- XXXTentacion - vocals, production, executive production, composition
- PnB Rock - vocals, composition
- Cleopatra Bernard - executive producer
- Carnage (DJ) - composer
- Mavado (singer) - composer
- Brandon Brown - mixing assistant
- Johann Chavez - engineer
- Gary Clark - mixing assistant
- JonFX - composer
- John Cunningham - bass, composer, drums, engineer, guitar, mixing, percussion, piano, producer, programming, string arrangements, synthesizer, vocal producer
- Noah Cyrus - featured artist
- Brian Eisner - engineer
- XXYYXX - composer, engineer
- Tom G - featured artist
- Isiah Gage - strings
- Dylan Getz - design, packaging
- Thomas L. Godbolt - composer
- Viva Goings - mixing assistant
- Koen Heldens - mixing
- Billy Hickey - engineer
- Juan "Saucy" Peña - engineer
- Mark Hoppus - composer
- Josh Humber - composer
- Ronny J - composer
- Kemba - engineer, featured artist
- Joey Badass - featured artist
- Paul Judge - composer, producer
- Ted Kay - composer
- Killstation - featured artist, mixing, producer
- Dave Kutch - mastering
- Tory Lanez - featured artist
- Jimmy Levy - composer, featured artist
- Lil Wayne - composer, featured artist
- Rico Love - vocal producer
- Joyner Lucas - featured artist
- Mally Mall - producer
- Matt Malpass - engineer
- Ky-Mani Marley - composer, featured artist
- Sauce Miyagi - engineer, mixing
- Sergio Montoya - design, packaging
- Duong Nyugen - design, packaging
- Robbie Owens-Russo - design, packaging
- Vybz Kartel - composer
- Juan "Saucy" Pena - engineer
- Kevin Peterson - mastering assistant
- Chris Quock - mixing assistant
- John Rodriguez - composer
- Rick Ross - featured artist
- Kristina Santa - assistant engineer
- Sauce Walka - composer, featured artist
- Ikabod Veins - composer, featured artist
- Jasper Sheff - composer, keyboards, producer
- Alexander "Smitty" Smith - engineer
- Solomon "Sounds" Sobande - management
- Cheng Sok - design packaging
- Robbie Soukiasyan - composer, drums, engineer, guitar, mixing, producer, string arrangements, string engineer
- Stefflon Don - featured artist
- Yang Tan - engineer
- Jorge Tavares - engineer
- Trippie Redd - featured artist
- Cool & Dre - composer
- Anneka Warburton - composer
- Craig Xen - composer, featured artist
- Gerard Yusuf - engineer
- Oscar Zayas - engineer

== Charts ==
=== Weekly charts ===
Chart (2019)	Peak position
Belgian Albums (Ultratop Flanders)	57
Belgian Albums (Ultratop Wallonia)	95
Canadian Albums (Billboard)	11
Danish Albums (Hitlisten)	15
Estonian Albums (IFPI)	7
Dutch Albums (Album Top 100)	27
French Albums (SNEP)	98
Irish Albums (IRMA)	37
Italian Albums (FIMI)	70
Latvian Albums (LAIPA)	6
New Zealand Albums (RMNZ)	25
Norwegian Albums (VG-lista)	15
Swiss Albums (Schweizer Hitparade)	41
UK Albums (Official Charts)	53
US Billboard 200	5
US Top R&B/Hip-Hop Albums (Billboard)	3

=== Year-end charts ===
Chart (2020)	Position
US Top R&B/Hip-Hop Albums (Billboard)	93

== Certifications ==
Region	Certification	Certified units/sales
United Kingdom (BPI)	Silver	60,000^{‡}
^{‡} Sales+streaming figures based on certification alone.
