= Bad! (XXXTentacion song) =

2018 single by XXXTentacion

Single by XXXTentacion

from the album Skins
- Released: November 9, 2018
- Recorded: 2018
- Studio: XXX Studios
- Genre: Pop rap; trap
- Length: 1:34
- Label: Bad Vibes Forever; Empire
- Songwriters: Jahseh Onfroy; John Cunningham; Robert Soukiasyan
- Producers: John Cunningham; Robert Soukiasyan

XXXTentacion singles chronology
"Arms Around You" (2018)	"Bad!" (2018)	"Run It Back!" (2019)

Music video
- "BAD!" on YouTube

"Bad!" (stylized as "BAD!") is a song by American rapper and singer XXXTentacion, released as a single on November 9, 2018. It is XXXTentacion's fifth posthumous single, and his third posthumous single to go platinum.

== Background ==
"Bad!" was previously teased along with three album projects XXXTentacion was set to release in 2018 before his death in June. Publications reported that "Bad!" would appear on Skins after a clip of XXXTentacion was posted to his Instagram timeline of him talking about the album after singing a line from it. DJ Scheme also said that the next of XXXTentacion's projects to be released would be Skins; this was confirmed in November after the pre-order for the album became available.

== Promotion ==
The song was previewed in footage posted to XXXTentacion's Instagram timeline, with the rapper singing a line of the song and talking about Skins.

== Music video ==
In November 2018, the XXXTentacion estate, along with Bad Vibes Forever and Empire Records, launched an animated video contest for the new single. Several artists created 15-second animated snippets from which fans of the late rapper voted for their favorite via XXXTentacion's official website.

The official music video for "Bad!" was released via XXXTentacion's YouTube page on December 15, 2018. It was animated and directed by Tristan Zammit. It features anime-style depictions of X with his various signature hairstyles as he is planting, cultivating, and then becoming one with the tree of life.

As of May 2023, the music video has been viewed over 180 million times.

== Covers ==
In January 2019, Dutch DJ R3hab released a cover of "Bad!" as a tribute to XXXTentacion.

== Personnel ==
Credits adapted from YouTube.

- XXXTentacion – vocals, writing
- Dave Kutch – mastering
- Kevin Peterson – mastering assistant
- John Cunningham – production, writing, recording, drums, programming
- Robert Soukiasyan – production, writing, mixing, keyboards

== Charts ==
=== Weekly charts ===
Chart (2018)	Peak position
Australia (ARIA)	31
Austria (Ö3 Austria Top 40)	50
Belgium (Ultratip Bubbling Under Flanders)	6
Belgium (Ultratip Bubbling Under Wallonia)	13
Canada Hot 100 (Billboard)	10
Czech Republic Singles Digital (ČNS IFPI)	39
Denmark (Tracklisten)	31
Estonia (IFPI)	9
Finland (Suomen virallinen lista)	20
France (SNEP)	55
Greece International Digital Singles (IFPI)	17
Hungary (Single Top 40)	39
Hungary (Stream Top 40)	13
Ireland (IRMA)	23
Italy (FIMI)	74
Latvia (LAIPA)	3
Netherlands (Single Top 100)	48
New Zealand (Recorded Music NZ)	25
Norway (VG-lista)	25
Slovakia Singles Digital (ČNS IFPI)	24
Sweden (Sverigetopplistan)	21
Switzerland (Schweizer Hitparade)	29
UK Singles (OCC)	23
US Billboard Hot 100	16
US Hot R&B/Hip-Hop Songs (Billboard)	7

=== Year-end charts ===
Chart (2019)	Position
US Hot R&B/Hip-Hop Songs (Billboard)	76

== Certifications ==
Region	Certification	Certified units/sales
France (SNEP)	Gold	100,000^{‡}
New Zealand (RMNZ)	Platinum	30,000^{‡}
United Kingdom (BPI)	Silver	200,000^{‡}
United States (RIAA)	Platinum	1,000,000^{‡}
^{‡} Sales+streaming figures based on certification alone.
