= Hearteater =

2019 single by XXXTentacion

Single by XXXTentacion

from the album Bad Vibes Forever
- Released: October 22, 2019
- Recorded: 2018
- Studio: XXX Studios
- Genre: Alternative rock
- Length: 2:16
- Label: Bad Vibes Forever; Empire
- Songwriter: Jahseh Onfroy
- Producers: John Cunningham; Robert Soukiasyan

XXXTentacion singles chronology
"ProudCatOwnerRemix" (2019)	"Hearteater" (2019)	"Bad Vibes Forever" (2019)

"Hearteater" (stylized in all caps) is a song by American rapper and singer XXXTentacion, released as the second single from his fourth (second posthumous) studio album Bad Vibes Forever.

== Background ==
On March 18, 2018, two days after the release of his second studio album ?, XXXTentacion asked his fans to get a Miami charity's Instagram page to 30,000 followers. In return, he promised to release a song that did not make the album's final tracklist. He released the song via SoundCloud on March 20.

== Artwork ==
The original SoundCloud cover art featured a picture of XXXTentacion stage diving at a concert held on March 18, 2018. The cover art of the single consists of XXXTentacion's former girlfriend Geneva Ayala, who accused him of domestic abuse in 2016, with a bloody mouth holding a heart.

== Release and promotion ==
XXXTentacion was murdered in June 2018. During an August 2019 interview, his manager Solomon Sobande revealed that the song would be included on XXXTentacion's fourth studio album Bad Vibes Forever. The song was released as the second single from the album on October 22.

=== Music video ===
The music video was teased a few days prior to the release, and featured a black and white snippet of XXXTentacion's former girlfriend, Geneva Ayala, who accused him of domestic abuse in 2016, and also appears on the single's cover. The teaser begins with a voice memo dated April 2018 (two months before XXXTentacion's death) of XXXTentacion explaining why he wanted her in the video, saying:

I feel like tying her into it makes the video amazing, and it almost, like, really captures everyone's minds and gives me the power that I truly deserve.

— XXXTentacion,

The music video was released on October 25, 2019, and features Ayala in a forest cannibalistically shredding the flesh of another person, presumably XXXTentacion. Ayala is then shown naked drenched in blood, before walking away as the video ends.

== Charts ==
Chart (2019)	Peak position
New Zealand Hot Singles (RMNZ)	36
