= Riot (XXXTentacion song) =

Single by XXXTentacion
- Released: May 1, 2015 (SoundCloud); June 1, 2020 (Empire re-release)
- Recorded: 2015
- Genre: Political hip hop; Boom bap
- Length: 1:19 (Note: 2:05 for the original 2015 SoundCloud release, which included an excerpt of a Ku Klux Klan speech that was largely removed from the version released on streaming services.)
- Label: Bad Vibes Forever; Empire
- Songwriter: Jahseh Onfroy
- Producer: Luke White

XXXTentacion singles chronology
"Bad Vibes Forever" (2019)	"Riot" (2020)	"Vice City" (2022)

"Riot" is a song by American rapper and singer XXXTentacion. It was originally released on SoundCloud in May 2015, before being re-released posthumously for streaming services on June 1, 2020, amid the George Floyd protests. The re-released version is slightly shorter than the original, cutting a large portion of a speech from former Ku Klux Klan leader Jeff Berry, which was used to point out the rising danger of racism, homophobia, and antisemitism in the United States.

== Background and composition ==
The track was originally released in May 2015, after protests of the killing of Michael Brown. The song was then released on streaming services in 2020 following the murder of George Floyd and the protests that followed. On the song, XXXTentacion is critical of the practice of rioting, while also denouncing racist and homophobic rhetoric from hate groups such as the Ku Klux Klan. Uproxx's Derick Rossignol noted how X expresses his belief that rioters often don't consider the consequences of their actions: "Look in all the stores you wreckin', nigga, I reckon / Think about the people who own it for 'bout a second / I know you got your problems, but brother, they got theirs / This is not a game, quit violence and grow a pair". However, X also sympathizes with the frustration of those rioting after instances of police brutality: "But I won't dare say that you should stop the fuckin' ignorance / Murder opps, killin' shit, I'd enjoy the thrill of it / Bathe in blood of officers, different corpses, offin' 'em". The song ends with dialogue from former KKK leader Jeff Berry's speech during a rally, which was featured in the 1998 documentary The Ku Klux Klan: A Secret History: "We see, I see, death before the children / White guys and white girls hanging from the buildings". The original song sampled more of the speech.

== Music video ==
The track was featured in the 2017 music video for Onfroy's 2015 track "Look at Me".

== Charts ==
Chart (2020)	Peak position
New Zealand Hot Singles (RMNZ)	1

== Certifications ==
Region	Certification	Certified units/sales
New Zealand (RMNZ)	Platinum	30,000^{‡}
United Kingdom (BPI)	Silver	200,000^{‡}
^{‡} Sales+streaming figures based on certification alone.
