= Rebel Diaz =

American hip hop group

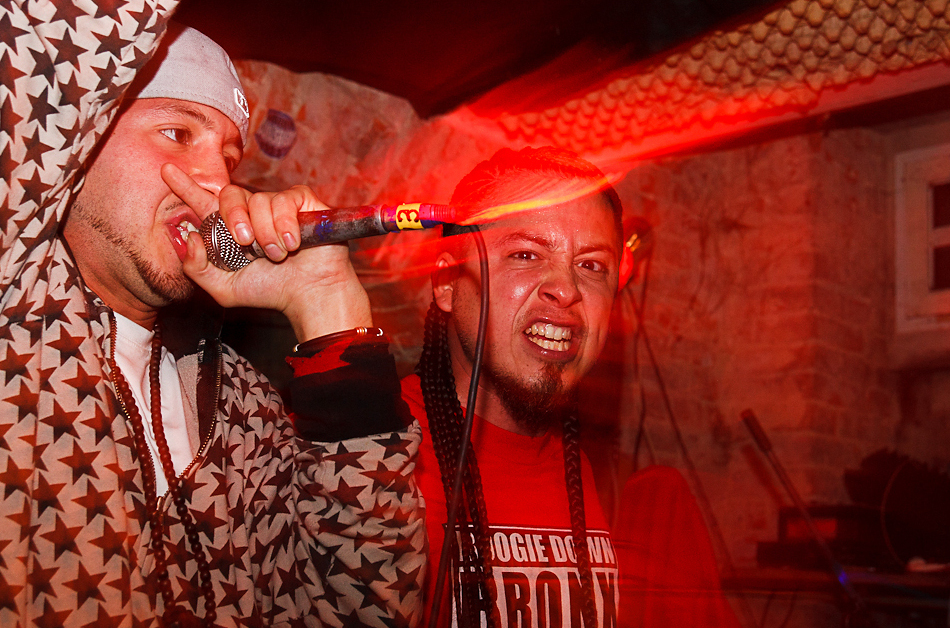
- G1 (left) and RodStarz performing in Berlin, Germany, 2011

Background information
- Origin: The Bronx, New York City, U.S.
- Genre: Hip hop
- Years active: 2006–present
- Label: independent
- Members: RodStarz; G1
- Past members: Lah Tere; DJ Illanoiz
- Website: Official page Rebel Diaz Arts Collective

Rebel Diaz is a political hip hop duo out of New York City and Chicago consisting of the Chilean brothers Rodrigo Venegas (known as RodStarz) and Gonzalo Venegas (known as G1). Rebel Diaz uses their music as an organizing tool and to spread knowledge about injustice. Hip hop website AllHipHop.com named Rebel Diaz one of the top fifty emerging/underground hip hop artists of 2013.

== History and activism ==
The children of Chilean activists, RodStarz and G1 were born in England and grew up in Chicago's North Side, and former member Lah Tere was raised in Humboldt Park, Chicago. Rebel Diaz identify with and position themselves within a history of political resistance through music, specifically citing the Nueva canción movement. Because of their organizing work, Rebel Diaz was invited to perform during the immigrant rights march in New York City in 2006.

Although Rebel Diaz met in Chicago, Illinois, Rebel Diaz was not born until the three moved to the Bronx – the birthplace of hip hop – to continue their political activism through hip hop. Rebel Diaz see themselves as reclaiming hip hop as a tool in the larger struggle against oppression. RodStarz and G1 work with youth in the South Bronx, teaching them to use music to express themselves.

== Rebel Diaz Arts Collective ==
In March 2009, Rebel Diaz opened the Rebel Diaz Arts Collective (RDAC), a community arts center that included a performance space, a multimedia studio, a computer lab, and an art gallery located in an abandoned warehouse in the South Bronx. RDAC served as a space for young people to learn and perform, hosting workshops in addition to providing artistic space. RDAC members such as YC the Cynic, Ozzy, Bliz Da Don, LC The Poet, Shell Sneed, and DJ Kay Kay 47 were students of workshops provided and also utilized the space to work on their craft. On February 28, 2013, the Rebel Diaz Arts Collective was forcefully evicted from the building.

== South by South Bronx ==
RodStarz and the RDAC hosted a music festival inspired by South by Southwest in December 2012 called South by South Bronx. The free two-day festival featured Grandmaster Caz, Afrika Bambaataa, C-Rayz Walz, and DJ Kool Herc, among others and in addition to musical performances, included workshops such topics as the "History and Art of DJing," "Hip-Hop and Activism" and "Latinos in Hip-Hop".

== Problems with the NYPD ==
On June 18, 2008, two days after returning from a conference in Berlin, Germany, G1 and RodStarz were arrested by the NYPD when they were showing a friend around the South Bronx. In response to the arrest, more than 150 supporters gathered outside the 41st Precinct stationhouse, demanding the release of RodStarz and G1, and they were represented by civil rights lawyer Norman Siegel. A week later, on June 24, 2008, at 2 AM, officers from the NYPD entered G1's apartment, which doubles as Rebel Diaz's recording studio, with guns drawn, shouted at G1, and left with no explanation. A year after their arrests, the charges were dropped by judge Darcel Clark, who cited the positive impact they have in their community and told them to "keep up the good work."

== Discography ==
Studio albums

- Radical Dilemma (2013)
- América -vs- Amerikkka (2018)

Mixtapes

- Otra Guerrillera Mixtape Vol. 1 (2006)
- Otro Guerrillero Mixtape Vol. 2 (2008)
- #OccupyTheAirwaves (mixed by DJ Illanoiz) (2011)

EPs

- Multiply, Vol. 1 (with Tef Poe) (2020)
- Multiply, Vol. 2 (with Tef Poe) (2020)

Compilation albums

- The 15 Year Anniversary Album (2021)
