= XXXTentacion =

American rapper and singer-songwriter (1998–2018)

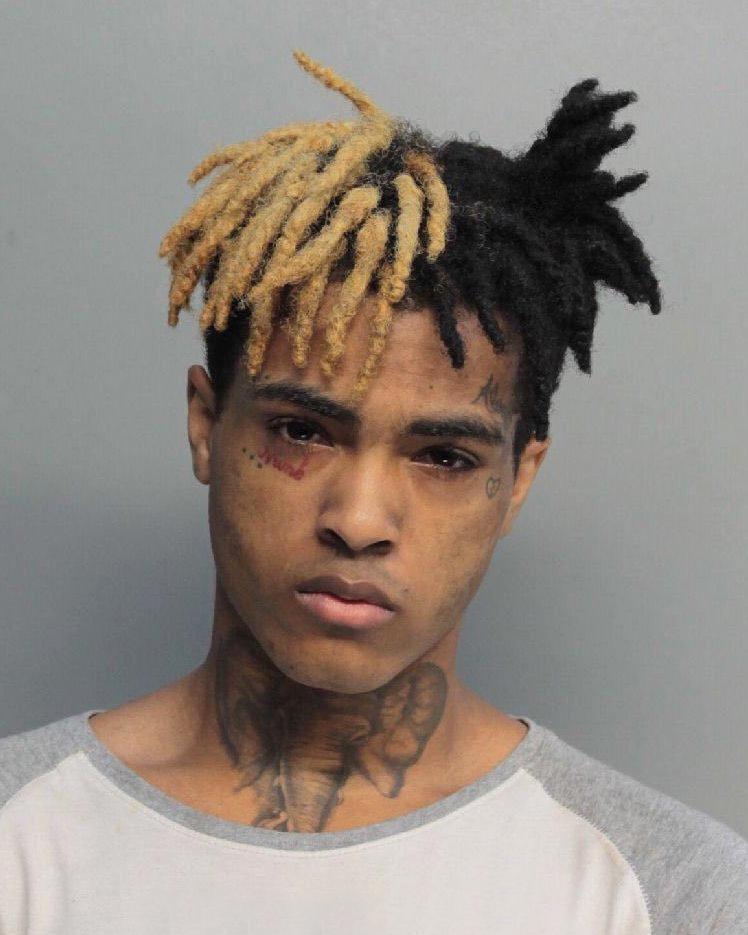
- XXXTentacion in 2016
- Born: Jahseh Dwayne Ricardo Onfroy; January 23, 1998; Plantation, Florida, U.S.
- Died: June 18, 2018 (aged 20); Deerfield Beach, Florida, U.S.
- Cause of death: Multiple gunshot wounds
- Resting place: Gardens of Boca Raton Memorial Park, Boca Raton, Florida, U.S.
- Other names: X; XXX; Triple X; Jah; Young Dagger Dick; MAKE OUT HILL
- Occupations: Rapper; singer; songwriter; record producer
- Years active: 2013–2018
- Agent: Solomon Sobande
- Works: Discography; production
- Partners: Geneva Ayala (2014–2016); Jenesis Sanchez (2017–2018) (Note: Until Onfroy's death)
- Children: 1 (Note: Onfroy's child was born seven months after his death.)
- Musical career
- Origin: Broward County, Florida, U.S.
- Genres: Hip-hop; emo rap; SoundCloud rap
- Labels: Bad Vibes Forever; Empire; Capitol; Caroline; Columbia
- Formerly of: Members Only

YouTube information
- Channel: XXXTentacion
- Years active: 2015–2018
- Subscribers: 43.3 million
- Views: 12.7 billion
- Last updated: July 24, 2026
- Website: xxxtentacion.com

Jahseh Dwayne Ricardo Onfroy (January 23, 1998 – June 18, 2018), professionally known as XXXTentacion, (Note: English: /ˌɛks.ɛks.ɛksˌtɛntəsˈjoʊn/ EKS-eks-eks-TEN-təss-YOHN, Latin American Spanish: [tentaˈsjon]. Alternatively stylized in all caps/lowercase throughout his career; often colloquially referred to as X or Triple X.) was an American rapper, singer-songwriter, and record producer. Though a controversial figure due to his widely publicized legal troubles, XXXTentacion gained a cult following among his young fan base during his short career with his depression and alienation-themed music. Critics and audiences often credit him for his musical versatility, with his music exploring emo, trap, trap metal, nu metal, indie rock, lo-fi, hip-hop, R&B, and punk rock. He was considered to be a leading figure in the establishment of the emo rap and SoundCloud rap genres, which garnered mainstream attention during the mid-to-late 2010s. In the years after his death, Onfroy's musical style went on to influence the development of rage music.

Born in Plantation, Florida, Onfroy spent most of his childhood in Lauderhill. He began writing music after being released from a juvenile detention center and soon started his music career on SoundCloud in 2013, employing styles and techniques that were considered unconventional in rap music such as distortion and heavy guitar-backed instrumentals, drawing inspiration from third-wave emo and grunge. In 2015, he formed the underground collective Members Only and soon became a popular figure in SoundCloud rap, a trap music scene that takes elements of lo-fi music and harsh 808s. Onfroy gained mainstream attention with his 2016 single "Look at Me!". His debut studio album, 17 (2017), peaked at number two on the Billboard 200, while his second album, ? (2018), debuted at the top the chart; both received certifications by the Recording Industry Association of America (RIAA). The latter's lead single, "Sad!", posthumously reached number one on the Billboard Hot 100 and received a diamond certification by the RIAA in August 2021.

On June 18, 2018, Onfroy, age 20, was murdered when he was shot near a motorcycle dealership in Deerfield Beach, Florida. In 2023, his murder suspects were found guilty and sentenced to life imprisonment without the possibility of parole. Onfroy has sold 110 million records in the US according to the RIAA, and has BPI-certified sales of over 13 million units in the UK, bringing his total to 123 million certified units sold in the two countries. Since his death, he has won an American Music Award and a BET Hip Hop Award and received 11 Billboard Music Award nominations. Two posthumous albums were released, Skins (2018) and Bad Vibes Forever (2019); the former became his second number-one album on the Billboard 200, while the latter entered the top five.

== Early life and education ==
Jahseh Dwayne Ricardo Onfroy was born on January 23, 1998, at Plantation General Hospital in Plantation, Florida, to Jamaican parents, Dwayne Ricardo Onfroy and Cleopatra Eretha Dreena Bernard. His father named him after the Bob Marley song "So Jah Seh", which interpolates Ezekiel 34. Both his father and grandfather were Rastafarians. Onfroy was born with a ventricular septal defect, commonly known as a "hole in the heart". Due to his condition, he never grew taller than 5 feet 6 inches. Onfroy stated he also had Syrian, Indian, and possibly Italian ancestry in an interview on The Beat in 2017.

Due to his mother's personal problems, Onfroy was mainly raised by his grandmother Collette Jones in Pompano Beach, Florida, and Lauderhill, Florida. When he was six years old, he allegedly tried to stab a man attempting to attack his mother and was eventually put into a youth program before living with his grandmother. A source close to the Onfroy family denied that the alleged stabbing incident occurred, and it could not be corroborated by police reports, since Onfroy was a minor. Despite this, trauma and domestic violence experts have stated that it is unlikely that the story was fabricated.

When Onfroy was a child, he discovered his uncle's deceased body after the man committed suicide by hanging. He referenced his trauma from the incident in multiple songs. In 2017, he alluded that he had been sexually abused by an unnamed adult when he was a child. Other traumatic events that Onfroy witnessed as a child included someone being physically tortured and someone being raped. According to his mother, he was routinely beaten by his father as a child; she claimed that Onfroy's father tried to hit her in front of Onfroy on several occasions. In early 2008, when Onfroy was ten, his father was jailed for nine years in Arizona on RICO charges after the Drug Enforcement Administration organized a sting operation. His father was deported to Jamaica in late 2016. In a 2017 interview, when asked about his relationship with his father, Onfroy sarcastically answered, "What's a father?"

Onfroy's interest in music initially started after his aunt persuaded him to begin attending school choir and later church choir. He was kicked out of the school choir after attacking another student for touching him. He attended Margate Middle School, from which he was later expelled after a series of physical altercations. He was subsequently enrolled into Sheridan House Family Ministries by his mother for over six months. Onfroy began to listen to rap, nu metal, and hard rock during his time at Sheridan House Family Ministries, which led to him learning how to play the piano and guitar.

Onfroy attended Piper High School until he dropped out in the tenth grade. He described himself as a "misfit" during that time, citing how quiet he was despite being popular and regularly involved in physical confrontations. As a child, he was diagnosed with bipolar disorder. Onfroy was not the athletic type and said that he was insecure and depressed during his time in high school.

== Career ==
=== 2013–2016: Career beginnings, "Look at Me", and ItWasntEnough ===
Onfroy's career as a music artist began in June 2013 after the release of his song "News/Flock". According to interviews, while in juvenile detention for gun possession charges, he met Stokeley Goulbourne, another artist known as Ski Mask the Slump God. Some sources interviewed for a 2020 biography dispute this narrative, and say that the pair met at high school. Onfroy and Goulbourne became good friends and began freestyling. Recalling his time in detention, Onfroy said that he was respectful to the officers and staff and used to protect people from other inmates, including a homosexual cellmate, whom Onfroy later attacked for allegedly staring at him while he was changing clothes. Onfroy stated that the incident was unrelated to the inmate's sexuality, that he supported gay rights and that he was not homophobic.

In 2013, following his release from a juvenile detention center, he and Goulbourne met up again under the belief they were going to commit a string of home invasions for monetary gain, though Onfroy eventually bought a Blue Snowball microphone and began recording music, which convinced Goulbourne to do the same. After Onfroy adopted the moniker XXXTentacion, he uploaded his first non-deleted song, called "Vice City", on SoundCloud, included on his debut mixtape XXX (Unmastered) released on March 5, 2014. The word "tentación" in his stage name is the Spanish word for "temptation". Speaking about his decision to abandon a life of crime for music, Onfroy said that he felt like music was a better outlet for his feelings and then-girlfriend Geneva Ayala was someone who helped him realize that.

He then continued uploading small snippets of his songs that he would either soon release or keep unreleased. Onfroy eventually joined Ski Mask the Slump God's group Very Rare, before breaking off and starting the Members Only collective in 2015, which Ski Mask then also joined.

Onfroy released his two first official extended plays (EPs), called E.motion and XXX, on April 30, 2014, alongside the original version of the song "Ecstasy" later remixed for Onfroy's last album Bad Vibes Forever. In June 2014, Onfroy collaborated with American rapper and producer Edward Skeletrix, who was then working under the name Cight, on the song "Elegant", which he produced. The Nobodys was released on July 11, 2014, but it was quickly removed when Onfroy decided to keep working on it before re-releasing this EP completely finished, but it never happened. The Fall was released on November 21, 2014. The Nobodys and The Fall were supposed to be part of a trilogy of EPs alongside The Underworld, inspired by the Weeknd's trilogy of mixtapes. However, The Underworld was completely abandoned when he started working on other projects. On February 3, 2015, Onfroy released the EP Heartbreak Hotel. Throughout 2015, he teased several different tracklists for the project, featuring additional songs, but none of these tracks, except for "Teeth (Interlude)", were ultimately added to the released EP. On April 20, 2015, Onfroy released a collaborative mixtape with Ski Mask the Slump God, Members Only Vol. 1, before releasing Members Only Vol. 2 with several members of the growing Members Only collective. On December 31, 2015, the original version of "Look at Me" was uploaded to the SoundCloud account of the song's co-producer, Rojas.

In 2016, Onfroy quit his job as a call center operator due to his growing music career and moved in with rapper Denzel Curry. On March 18, 2016, Onfroy released the EP ItWasntEnough. On April 28, 2016, Onfroy released the EP Willy Wonka Was a Child Murderer, with music heavily inspired by heavy metal and indie music. In July 2016, Onfroy was arrested and charged with robbery and assault with a deadly weapon. After posting $10,000 bail, Onfroy continued to work on his debut independent album, Bad Vibes Forever, which had a slated October 31, 2016, release date. The album missed the release date and was delayed due to Onfroy being arrested in early October on multiple charges of false imprisonment, witness tampering and aggravated battery of his allegedly pregnant girlfriend.

=== 2017: Release from prison, Revenge, 17, and A Ghetto Christmas Carol ===
In 2017 "Look at Me" gained traction, peaked at number 34 on US Billboard Hot 100 and the top 40 of the Canadian Hot 100. The single helped him gain more popularity due to accusations of Canadian rapper Drake using a similar rap flow in his song "KMT". Onfroy's distinctive half-colored hair, which was inspired by The Hundred and One Dalmatians antagonist Cruella de Vil, also drew public attention. During his jail stint, Onfroy signed a deal to be managed by Soloman Sobande (who remained his manager until his death) and despite Onfroy being in jail during his initial breakthrough, major-label scouts began offering six-figure contracts and Onfroy eventually signed for Empire Distribution for lower royalty rate, full creative control and a smaller upfront payment. After his release from prison on April 18, 2017, he released three more songs on SoundCloud. In an interview with WMIB, Onfroy announced that he was working on the studio albums Bad Vibes and 17; as well as a mixtape, I Need Jesus. In an interview three days after his release from prison, Onfroy said to XXL, "I got this really, really, really good album called 17. That's more of an alternative, R&B sound—then I've got this mixtape called I Need Jesus, which is mainly rap and the underground sound I did."

Onfroy announced his first nationwide tour on April 28, 2017. The tour, titled "The Revenge Tour", had 26 tour dates overall and generated much media coverage, included that of a rapper being assaulted, Onfroy being knocked out after an altercation on stage, an audience member being stabbed, Onfroy being thrown into a barricade by security, and an incident in which Onfroy punched a fan after the fan had placed his hand on Onfroy's chest. He announced the cancellation of the rest of the tour dates due to his cousin being shot on June 24, 2017, though the final tour date in Broward County, Florida, still went ahead and was later streamed on the watchthemusic (WAV) app.

On June 13, 2017, Onfroy was featured on the cover of XXL, as part of its annual "Top 10 Freshman List", along with fellow up-and-coming rappers such as Playboi Carti, A Boogie wit da Hoodie, Ugly God, and PnB Rock. Onfroy released his debut commercial solo mixtape, Revenge, on May 16, 2017. The mixtape consists of eight previously released songs. The collaborative mixtape, Members Only, Vol. 3, with Members Only, was released on June 26, 2017. Onfroy's first opener for a major act happened when DRAM brought Onfroy out at a concert on August 9, 2017, at the Staples Center in Los Angeles during Kendrick Lamar's Damn Tour. Onfroy released his debut album, 17, on August 25, 2017. The album debuted at number 2 on the US Billboard 200, selling 86,000 album-equivalent units first week. The album received a mixed response from critics, some of whom lauded the album for its personal narratives and diverse musical style. On September 3, 2017, Onfroy announced that Bad Vibes Forever, his second album, was still in production.

17 gave Onfroy's seven songs—"Jocelyn Flores", "Revenge", "Fuck Love", "Everybody Dies in Their Nightmares", "Depression & Obsession", "Save Me", and "Carry On"—that debuted in the Billboard Hot 100 at number 31, 77, 41, 54, 91, 94 and 95, respectively. Jocelyn Flores became Onfroy's highest-charting song since "Look at Me", which peaked it at 34. Onfroy then had his ninth song to chart on the Billboard Hot 100, in turn with his being featured on Kodak Black's song "Roll in Peace", taken from Project Baby 2. The song debuted at 52 and peaked at 31, matching "Jocelyn Flores". On September 12, 2017, Onfroy released his first official music video for his 2015 song "Look at Me", as well as sharing a music video with his 2015 song "Riot". Onfroy's label, Bad Vibes Forever, signed a distribution deal with Capitol Music Group subsidiary, Caroline, on October 19, 2017. The deal, reportedly worth $6 million, was for one album only. Shortly afterwards on October 25, 2017, Onfroy announced he was terminating his contract with Caroline despite a representative confirming he was still signed. Two days later, he announced that he was retiring due to negativity and backlash though some publications noted that Onfroy made similar statements before and not followed through. On October 30, 2017, Onfroy announced that he would make music again if fellow Broward rapper and "former best friend", Ski Mask the Slump God, was his friend again. Later, Onfroy answered a fan's question on Instagram Live about his retirement, saying, "Am I quitting? Yes, I'm quitting—I don't know for how long, but I'm just not going to make music right now."

On September 22, 2017, Noah Cyrus released her single titled "Again", featuring Onfroy's vocals. Onfroy previewed new music on November 2, 2017, signaling a return to making music. Onfroy announced Bad Vibes Forever again on November 17, 2017, speaking on the album, Onfroy said "It will be a mix of genres you have seen me dabble with, if you are not a fan of me this is not an album for you, it is for core fans only". The album title shares its name with his label. On December 11, 2017, Onfroy released his tenth EP, A Ghetto Christmas Carol on SoundCloud. A day before his hearing for witness tampering charges, Onfroy announced that he was preparing three albums to be ready for 2018, and after being released on house arrest, he announced the titles of all three albums, Skins, Bad Vibes Forever and ?.

=== 2018: YouTube channel and ? ===
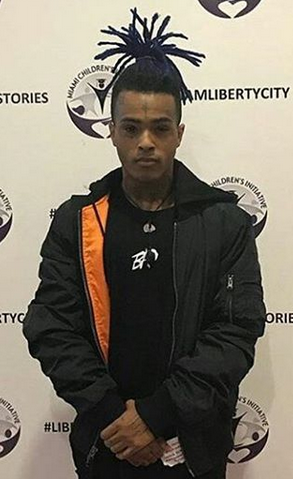
Onfroy at an event for the Miami Children's Initiative in February 2018

On June 22, 2015, Onfroy began to use his long-time YouTube channel "xxxtentacion" (now stylized in all caps), previously used to upload music, gaming videos and vlogs. The channel had 36.7 million subscribers and an estimated 9 billion total views by April 2022. On January 22, 2018, Onfroy announced on Instagram that he and New York rapper Joey Badass had been creating a project together, releasing a freestyle to the song "King's Dead" on SoundCloud on March 9, 2018, in preparation for the collaboration.

The "xxxtentacion" YouTube channel uploaded the video "#THEHELPINGHANDCHALLENGE" on the same day. The video included Onfroy donating musical instruments, video game consoles, and other gifts to a foster home. Shortly afterwards, Onfroy declared his album had finished and he was preparing to release it but would only do so after the hashtag #HELPINGHANDCHALLENGE reached one million mentions on Instagram.

Onfroy released his first single of 2018 on February 2, titled "Shining Like the Northstar". He was also featured on long-time collaborator and producer Ronny J's track "Banded Up". Onfroy released the song "Hope" on his SoundCloud account on February 21, 2018, dedicated to the victims of the Stoneman Douglas High School shooting, which had occurred in Parkland, several miles north of Onfroy's native Plantation. Onfroy announced that he was releasing two songs at midnight on March 2, 2018, both the first singles for his second album ?.

The lead single for ?, "Sad!", was released several hours later alongside "Changes", which features fellow 2017 XXL "Freshman" PnB Rock. "Sad!" debuted at number 17, becoming his highest-charting song in the United States, and eventually peaked at number 1 after Onfroy's death before releasing its official music video on June 28. The music video focused on Onfroy stressing that he had changed as a person since the main controversies in his career occurred. "Moonlight" and "Hope" also charted after his death, peaking at number 13 and 70, respectively.

Onfroy announced the release date for his second studio album, ?, on March 12, 2018. He shared the 18-track track listing with features from Joey Badass, Travis Barker and PnB Rock. ? was released on March 16, 2018. ? debuted at number one on the Billboard 200, becoming Onfroy's first number one in the country, losing out with his debut album 17 due to Lil Uzi Vert's Luv Is Rage 2. Shortly following the release of ?, Onfroy signed a new album deal with Empire Distribution for his third solo album worth ten million dollars.

== Posthumous releases ==
=== 2018–2020: Skins and Bad Vibes Forever ===
On June 21, 2018, the first posthumous song featuring Onfroy was released, "Ghost Busters", with Trippie Redd featuring Quavo and Ski Mask the Slump God, and was uploaded on Trippie Redd's SoundCloud. XXL released a series of freestyles that Onfroy performed as a part of his "2017 Freshman Cypher". Ugly God released a song titled "Tear Drop" on June 22, 2018, which featured Onfroy's aforementioned unreleased cypher verses, as a tribute to Onfroy. A few months later, he won the Best New Hip Hop Artist at the BET Hip Hop Awards and won the Favorite Album-Soul/R&B for 17 at the American Music Awards. On Trippie Redd's 2021 album, Trip at Knight, a reworked version of "Ghost Busters" titled "Danny Phantom" was released, with Onfroy as the sole feature rather than the inclusions of Ski Mask the Slump God and Quavo.

On August 31, 2018, Houston rapper Sauce Walka released his Drip God mixtape which featured a collaboration with Onfroy titled "Voss" produced by Carnage. On August 17, 2018, iLoveMakonnen announced a collaboration between Lil Peep and Onfroy titled "Falling Down". A reworking of "Sunlight on Your Skin" made by Makonnen and Peep, the new version features verses by Onfroy that he recorded after Peep's death to pay tribute to Peep. The single was officially released on September 19, 2018. On September 27, 2018, Kanye West announced Onfroy would've been a featured artist on his cancelled ninth studio album, Yandhi. The same day, it was reported that Onfroy will also be a featured artist on Lil Wayne's twelfth album, Tha Carter V, which was released the next day. Onfroy was featured on the song, "Don't Cry". A music video was later released on what would've been Onfroy's 21st birthday.

On October 22, 2018, Onfroy's manager Soloman Sobande stated in an interview with Billboard that Onfroy's third album would come "very soon" and that he had more than two album's worth of material. On October 25, 2018, EDM DJ-producer Skrillex released the song "Arms Around You", which is a collaboration he made with Onfroy, Lil Pump, Maluma and Swae Lee. The track was originally recorded in 2017 with Rio Santana, who appeared on Onfroy's ? album, but was later changed to add bigger star co-features. Specifically, Lil Pump contacted Onfroy's mother to ask to use Onfroy's vocals on the track as a tribute. Following the release of "Arms Around You", the song's producer, Mally Mall was interviewed by Power 106's The Cruz Show where he confirmed that nine Onfroy songs were going to be released soon with one having a Rihanna feature and another having a Weeknd feature. On November 8, 2018, the release date for Onfroy's first posthumous album and his third studio album, Skins, was announced as being given a December 7, 2018. The first single from Skins, titled "Bad!", was released on November 9, 2018. Onfroy was a surprise feature on Lil Wayne and Ty Dolla $ign's track "Scared of the Dark" from the soundtrack to the film Spider-Man: Into the Spider-Verse. On January 23, 2019, the Members Only collective and Onfroy's estate released the album Members Only, Vol. 4. On June 12, 2019, Craig Xen released the song "Run It Back!" which featured Onfroy on the track.

A month after on July 21, 2019, another posthumous song was released, titled "Royalty", which featured one of Bob Marley's children, Ky-Mani Marley, Stefflon Don, and Vybz Kartel. The dance-hall inspired track was the first song released from the album, Bad Vibes Forever, which released in December 2019. On October 21, 2019, the song "Hearteater" was officially released by Onfroy's estate as the second single for the album. On November 22, 2019, the title track of the album Bad Vibes Forever was released. The fourth and final studio album was released on December 6, 2019. In January 2020, Lil Wayne remixed X's song "The Boy with the Black Eyes" for his Funeral album, on the track "Get Outta My Head".

On June 1, 2020, his song "Riot" was re-released onto streaming services to spread awareness to the protests following the murder of George Floyd.

=== 2021–2025: Look at Me documentary, Look at Me: The Album, In His Own Words documentary, and re-releases ===
He became the first artist to posthumously release music as NFTs with five scrapped SoundCloud songs on May 10, 2021, in which News/Flock was slightly re-worked on. On August 20, 2021, Trippie Redd released his fourth studio album Trip at Knight, which includes a verse from Onfroy on the fourteenth track, "Danny Phantom". The track is a reworked version of Redd and Onfroy's song "Ghost Busters," which originally featured Quavo and Ski Mask the Slump God. This new version features a rage-inspired instrumental, previously unreleased ad-libs from Onfroy, and omits the guest verses from Quavo and Ski Mask. In November 2021, Solomon Sobande, Onfroy's manager, said that a posthumous collaboration between Onfroy and late emo rapper Juice Wrld is in the works.

On January 23, 2022, on what would have been Onfroy's 24th birthday, his estate announced that they would be releasing his 2014 SoundCloud track, "Vice City", to all streaming services on January 28, 2022. Considered a fan-favorite, the song was his first release on SoundCloud. The release is the first by his estate in efforts to make all his unofficial releases available on main streaming platforms. It was also confirmed that a documentary about the rapper, titled Look at Me, was in the works. It was released on Hulu on May 26, 2022. On February 23, 2022, rapper Kanye West released the demo album Donda 2, in which Onfroy has featured vocals on the songs "True Love" and "Selfish". On May 23, 2022, it was announced on by Onfroy's estate on his Instagram account that a new album, titled Look at Me: The Album would be released alongside the documentary, and that "True Love" would be released as a single from the album on May 27, 2022. On June 10, 2022, along with his documentary, Look at Me: The Album released, featuring 25 songs including his earlier SoundCloud songs, his biggest hits, and the single "True Love" with Kanye West.

On November 22, 2022, the documentary In His Own Words was released. The film primarily features previously unseen interviews conducted by Fader Films in 2017 and is considered a companion piece to the May 2022 documentary Look at Me. On December 16, 2022, the single "WitDemDicks!" was released onto streaming and digital download. The song was originally released on SoundCloud in 2015. In 2023, singles such as "Very Rare Forever Freestyle", "I'm Not Human" and "Let's Pretend We're Numb" were released onto streaming and digital download, as well as a re-release of Onfroy's 2016 EP ItWasntEnough and a remaster and remix of "Emoji" in collaboration with Ronny J. On June 19, 2024, the single "Teeth (Interlude)" was released on streaming services and for digital download. The song was originally released on SoundCloud in 2015.

On May 30, 2025, Juice Wrld's remix of Onfroy's song "Whoa (Mind in Awe)" was released. On July 11, 2025, as a part of the 5th anniversary of Juice Wrld's third album Legends Never Die, the song "The Way" with Onfroy was released as a part of the anniversary. On July 30, 2025, Ski Mask the Slump God released The Lost Files, a compilation album consisting of older SoundCloud tracks that were previously unavailable on streaming services. The album includes three older collaborations with Onfroy: "Fatality", "Broly", and "IWatchedHimDrown".

=== 2026–present: Make Out Hill ===
On July 11, 2026, Make Out Hill, an animated feature inspired by Onfroy's life and musical legacy, was announced. Developed by Martian Blueberry in partnership with his estate, the project is in pre-production and is described as an original story inspired by his imagination, creativity, and legacy rather than a traditional biographical adaptation.

== Musical style ==
"Save Me" (2015)
"Save Me" by the hip-hop group Members Only (released 2015) shows Onfroy replicating his screaming-like rap flow alongside his aggressive and violent lyrics. The distorted production is a mark of Onfroy's earlier music and the sound that boosted him into the mainstream.

"Jocelyn Flores"
Onfroy demonstrates a softer rapping style and ability to sing on "Jocelyn Flores", one of the singles released from his first studio album 17

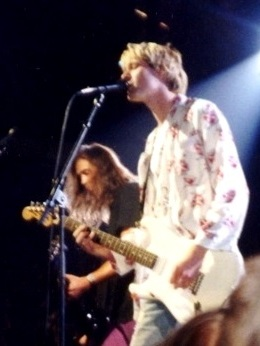
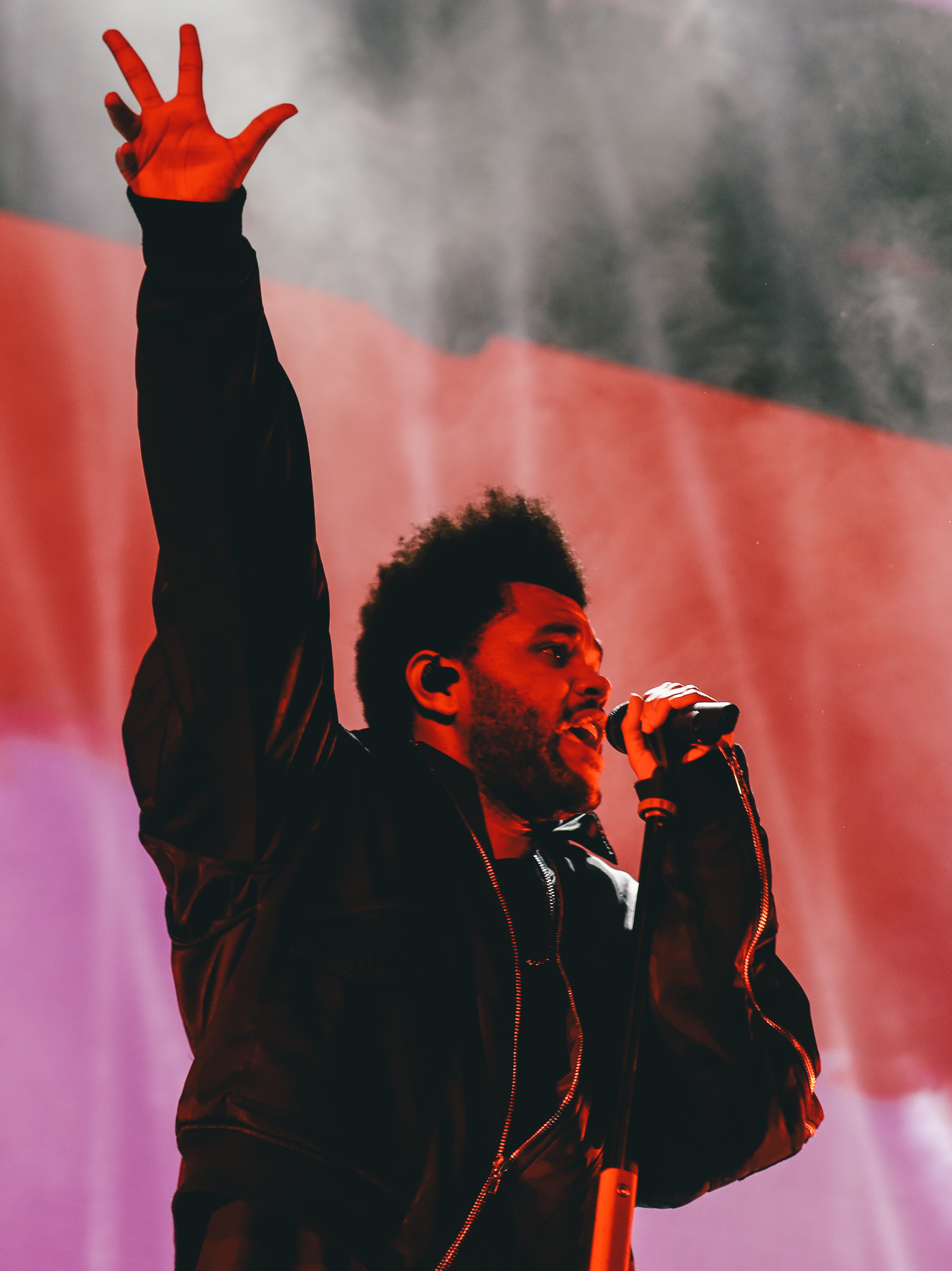
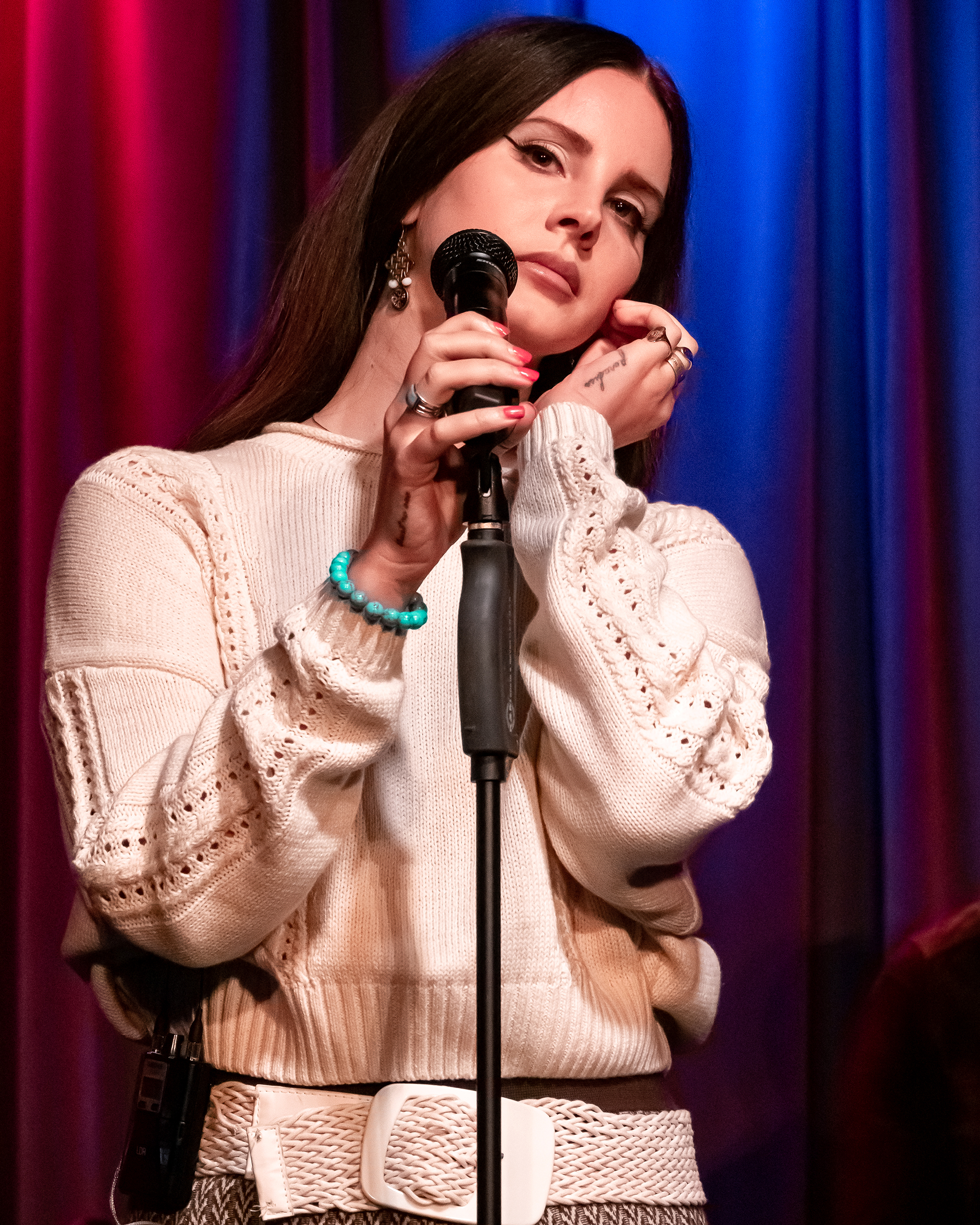
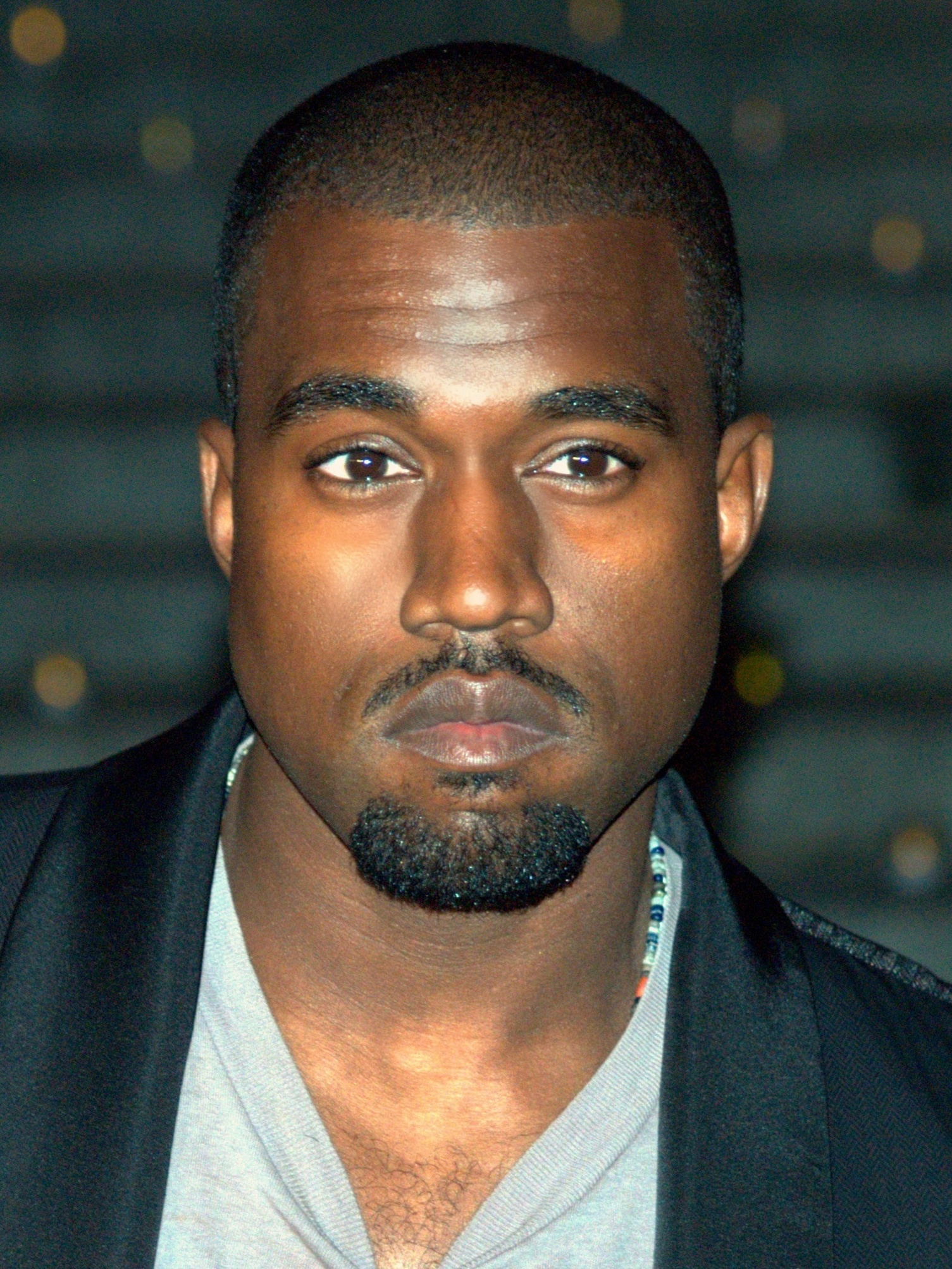
XXXTentacion took inspiration from a variety of artists such as (clockwise from top) Kurt Cobain, The Weeknd, Kanye West, and Lana Del Rey.

Onfroy's music explored a wide variety of genres, including emo, trap, lo-fi, indie rock, punk rock, nu metal, and hip-hop. His influences included Kurt Cobain, 2Pac, Cage the Elephant, Chingy, Coldplay, Eminem, The Fray, Chief Keef, Gorillaz, Hoobastank, Lana Del Rey, Laura Mvula, The Notorious B.I.G., Papa Roach, Yoko Shimomura, Slipknot, Tech N9ne, Three Days Grace, the Weeknd, and Kanye West.

When speaking of his influences, Onfroy said, "I'm really into multi-genre things that aren't just based around rapping itself. I'm more inspired by artists in other genres besides rap." Onfroy as an artist has been defined as versatile and his music has been described as having a "lo-fi" aesthetic, being diverse and experimental, drawing influence from heavy metal. His music also has the tendency to contain distorted bass and an "intentional lack of polish". Speaking about this, Onfroy said that the intentionally bad mixing on his tracks make it "genuine". Some fans have also noted that his music has inspired many up-and-coming artists, such as Juice Wrld and Trippie Redd, into channeling similar aesthetics into their music, with the former dedicating the song "Legends" to Onfroy following his death. Trippie Redd went on and credited Onfroy as a pioneer of rage music, a subgenre of trap which adapted some musical techniques that Onfroy had employed in his music.

Onfroy generally changed his vocal style depending on the type of song he was performing on. His vocal style has been described as displaying "emotional vulnerability" on much more depressing tracks and as replicating screaming on much more aggressive tracks. His songwriting has been described as outlandish and shocking, often referring to "violence, sex, and drugs", though on some projects such as The Fall and 17, Onfroy's songwriting was more emotional in comparison to his previous work, often referring to loneliness, depression, isolation, and anxiety. He was known for his "depressing, and at times devastating" music that brought attention to mental health.

== Public image and feuds ==
Onfroy was generally considered a controversial figure within the hip-hop industry due to public feuds with other artists, legal issues, and general social media scandals. Spin labeled Onfroy "rap's most controversial man" and XXL labeled him as their most "controversial freshman ever".

On August 24, 2017, a day before the release of his debut album, 17, Onfroy uploaded a video to the social media platform Instagram of him depicting the act of suicide by hanging. He later uploaded a video onto Instagram showcasing the video being shot in part of a music video.

Onfroy uploaded a music video to YouTube for his song "Riot" after sharing a music video for his on September 12, 2017. The controversial scene portrays him placing a noose around the neck of a Caucasian child then hanging him (representing lynching). The child's mother originally was anxious about the scene but said she was fine with the message being portrayed, which Onfroy explained as, "No matter how you look at it, the four murders I showed in the beginning were murders that were done by supremacists that were real. That white boy is still alive. So the people that died in the video are real. Everyone is so bothered by the child being lynched, but whether you realize it or not, the murders in the beginning are all real. Heather Heyer, Emmett Till, Philando Castile, these are real murders. This Caucasian child is still alive. It's art portrayal... It's me basically putting the shoe on the other foot, showing another perspective." Talking on Instagram Live, he told his followers that the video was not just supporting Black Lives Matter, but was also supporting All Lives Matter.

Onfroy announced he was retiring from producing music on October 27, 2017. Onfroy then stated using the Instagram story feature that he would make music again if South Floridian rapper, frequent collaborator, and best friend Ski Mask the Slump God would become his friend again, telling his fans to post "Be friends with X again" on Ski Mask's social media accounts. The post led to a social media exchange between the two, with Onfroy explaining his side using the Instagram Live feature on Instagram:

It was a lack of appreciation on his end, not because of me, I guess just from a business perspective. But he put a business perspective before a personal relationship, and I've been with him as a friend and as a brother for a very long time. I mean, it's just on some other shit to be honest. It's not on anything I've done wrong. I can't even say I've done anything to him, and I wouldn't go on the Internet and express that if I didn't care about the relationship, but you already know how it goes. They use you to where they wanna go and then part ways. And I've been used a lot if you haven't noticed.

Ski Mask replied shortly afterward, using Instagram's story feature, "[I'll] always love that alien-looking nigga named XXX, but I have to distance myself because it's like nobody would see me as an individual rapper if I don't, on top of that, that nigga crazy as hell", Ski Mask then went on to post a much more intense version of the story, claiming that Onfroy threatened his family. On December 8, 2017, Onfroy wrote on Instagram, "don't care about what you said about me, you know who got your back, love you, forever", referring to Ski Mask the Slump God. Later, during Rolling Loud in Miami in 2018, they reunited, ending the feud.

Following a rumor that Onfroy was arrested in Las Vegas, Houston rapper Ugly God tweeted "Free X" which prompted a strong response from Onfroy, which featured Onfroy insulting Ugly God. Ugly God later clarified there was no feud between them.

Canadian rapper Drake previewed a new track, titled "KMT", on January 28, 2017. The song, following its preview, was compared by users on social media to Onfroy's breakout song "Look at Me" due to the use of a similar triplet-heavy flow. Before the release of KMT, HotNewHipHop revealed that Drake followed Onfroy's account on Twitter. In an interview with XXL, Onfroy was questioned about the Drake comparisons, responding "If Drake is gonna take the flow, and I don't know if he legitimately did, but if that is the situation, at least reach out to a nigga, help a nigga out in this situation."

Drake released the mixtape More Life on March 18, 2017, which included "KMT". Onfroy was released from jail on probation two weeks later and was subsequently interviewed by WMIB, where he called Drake a "bitch" and said that he respected Drake's influence but felt like "KMT" was disrespecting him. The following day on Twitter, Onfroy posted a picture of Drake's mother saying "she could get it". He then posted a picture of Drake's mother and a child version of Drake with Onfroy's face photoshopped over that of Drake's father, Dennis Graham. Later, in an interview with DJ Semtex, Drake denied those accusations that he stole Onfroy's "flow". Drake also denied knowing him and said that he only heard about him regarding rumors circulated following the "KMT" snippet. Onfroy replied on his Twitter page requesting that Drake "come to Florida", after Onfroy saying that he will not "Twitter rap with niggas".

Rapper Offset from the hip-hop group Migos used Instagram's livestream feature to verbally attack Onfroy, further escalating the feud. Chicago rapper 600Breezy then claimed that Drake gave him permission to enter into the feud and attack Onfroy. 600Breezy told Onfroy that he has "got a couple niggas that will knock you off in your own city". 600Breezy later went to Florida to attempt to search for him, though it was fruitless.

On November 14, Onfroy posted on his Instagram story accusing rap group Migos of attacking him and pointing a firearm at him due to his former issues with Drake.

The music streaming service Spotify announced on May 10, 2018, that it was going to stop promoting or recommending music by Onfroy, Tay-K, and R. Kelly. Spotify stated, "We don't censor content because of an artist's or creator's behavior, but we want our editorial decisions—what we choose to program—to reflect our values". Onfroy and his team responded criticizing the decision, arguing that artists such as Ozzy Osbourne, Dr. Dre, David Bowie, and Michael Jackson were not being censored despite more severe allegations being levied against them than the ones brought against Onfroy. The decision to remove Onfroy's music from curated playlists was later reversed after Top Dawg Entertainment CEO Anthony Tiffith threatened to remove his label's music from the service. Although Tiffith did the action, Onfroy thanked Kendrick Lamar and Top Dawg as a whole.

=== Incidents at concerts ===
On March 26, 2017, following Onfroy's release from jail, he set up a surprise concert that was arranged for April 7 in Miami. The show had an admission price of $5 until it was apparently filled up. However, before he arrived, a riot broke out. Police eventually escorted Onfroy out and closed the show down.

Rapper and member of Onfroy's Members Only collective Wifisfuneral was assaulted at the first show in the Revenge Tour in Houston on May 31, 2017. Wifisfuneral stage-dived into the audience where several audience members proceeded to kick him and then leave the venue.

During a concert in San Diego in June 2017, a physical altercation occurred, which led to Onfroy being knocked unconscious and an audience member being stabbed, though the injury was non-life-threatening. The assailant was reported to be an associate of rapper Rob Stone, then involved in a feud involving Onfroy and Ski Mask. The feud had already led to Ski Mask the Slump God being assaulted during rapper Desiigner's Outlet tour. Stone released a diss track following the attack, titled "Xxxtracredit", in which he mentions the attack in San Diego and then proceeds to tell Onfroy to "not come back to California". Later in an interview, Stone denied knowing who the assailant was. In October 2017, Stone confirmed that he and Onfroy had talked and resolved their feud.

Onfroy punched an audience member during a concert at the Complex in Salt Lake City, Utah on June 16, 2017. He claimed this was in self-defense, as he had requested that no one in the audience touch him, warning that he would punch them if they did.

Onfroy was scheduled to perform at the Concord Music Hall in Chicago, Illinois on June 20, 2017. The concert was canceled at the last minute, which led to hundreds of fans flooding the streets and nearly starting a riot. He said that the reason for the performance being canceled was the venue management's decision. Three days later, his cousin was shot and he canceled his tour.

Following the release of Onfroy's 17 album, a free concert was announced to take place at the Orpheum in Tampa, Florida, on September 2, 2017. The venue only had the capacity to support 750 concertgoers, but over 3,000 people appeared to attend the concert and the venue had to cancel the concert before a safety hazard was created. This led to many fans of the artist nearly rioting in the street and the police needing to break up the crowd. Some fans later claimed online that they were teargassed by police officers following the riot.

Onfroy was involved in another brawl with a fan during California's Rolling Loud Festival on October 21, 2017. Onfroy announced on Instagram that the fight was purely self-defense before any video of the altercation was uploaded.

== Legal issues ==
=== Juvenile charges ===
In late 2012, Onfroy was arrested for possession of 21 grams of marijuana, a felony in Florida law. He was sentenced to one month of juvenile detention and six months at a behavioral correction facility. Shortly after his release, he was arrested again for breaking into a house to steal a laptop to create music.

In 2014, Onfroy was sent to a youth detention center for a year on gun possession charges. According to Onfroy, during his time in detention, the district attorney attempted to try him as an adult for gun possession, which would have had a sentence of 5–10 years in prison. Onfroy's narrative of this time in youth detention has been disputed by sources interviewed for a 2020 biography; he may have served one month's detention as part of a wider sentence of less than one year, and his charges cannot be corroborated by public files as he was a juvenile.

In August 2015, Onfroy attempted to commit suicide by running into incoming traffic. He was transferred to the hospital for his injuries, and was ultimately fined $86.50 for the incident.

=== Stabbing of Tablez ===
Dylan Turner, known professionally as Tablez, a New Jersey native studying at Full Sail University, managed Onfroy and his best friend Ski Mask the Slump God in 2016. Due to Onfroy's inexperience in music and Tablez's inexperience in management, they agreed that Tablez would be paid only in the proceeds from the song "Look at Me!".

One night, Ski Mask and Tablez got into an argument while at Tablez's apartment, which led to Ski Mask storming out. Ski Mask later called Onfroy while drunk and lied that Tablez had taken thousands from Onfroy. According to Tablez's account, days later an angry Onfroy and others broke into Tablez's apartment and Onfroy shouted, "What if I stab you? What if I fucking stab you?" while poking a knife towards Tablez's stomach, stopping just a few inches short and then pulling back. Tablez said that he did not know if Onfroy meant to stab him, because Onfroy said in shock, "Oh fuck", after Tablez exclaimed to Onfroy that he had stabbed him as the blade sank into Tablez's abdomen. Tablez recounted that Onfroy and the others then stole his laptop and fled.

Tablez required emergency surgery and suffered life-changing injuries. He pledged to drop charges against Onfroy if his computer could be returned, saying that he "didn't want one bad choice to define who [Onfroy] was." Tablez stuck to his word despite all its files being deleted. Onfroy paid for the entirety of Tablez's hospital bills, and later apologized to Tablez and thanked him for dropping the charges, stating to him, "Thank you for dropping the charges. As fucked up as the situation is, I am forever in your debt." When asked if he thought Onfroy was genuinely changing later in life to become a better person, Tablez responded, "Yes. Deep down we all are."

=== Robbery, assault with a deadly weapon, and home invasion charges ===
On July 14, 2016, days after being bailed for stabbing Tablez, Onfroy was arrested and charged with robbery, assault with a deadly weapon, and home invasion committed in November 2015. According to the arrest report, Onfroy entered the home of Che Thomas with three other people, armed with a firearm. After pistol-whipping Thomas three times, Onfroy escaped the home with an iPad, an iPhone, a Sony PlayStation Portable, and $20.

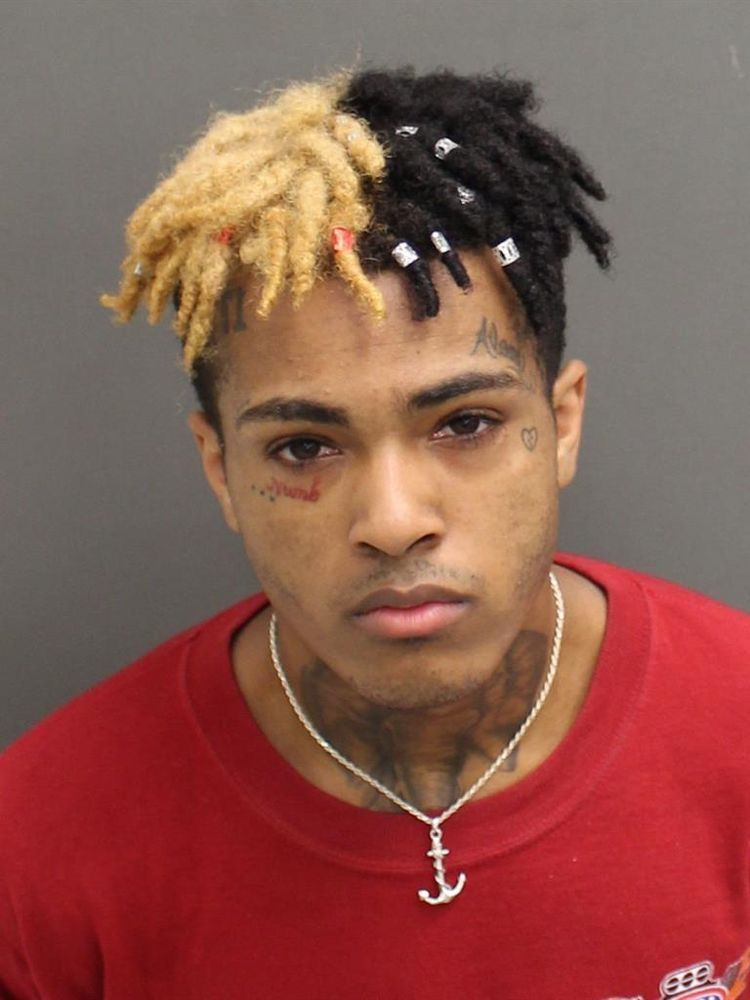
Mugshot of Onfroy in July 2016

Onfroy was arrested in Orlando originally, but was later transferred to Orange County. His constant relocations were due to an eventually successful plan by prosecutors to find a jurisdiction that would charge him as an adult for a crime committed as a juvenile. He was released on a $10,000 bond in September 2016. Following Thomas requesting that Onfroy not receive prison time, Onfroy pleaded no contest to the charges and was ultimately sentenced to six years probation.

=== Domestic violence and witness tampering charges ===
After posting the bail of $10,000 in early October of the same year, while awaiting trial, Onfroy was arrested again later that month on charges of aggravated battery of a pregnant woman, domestic battery, and false imprisonment. On March 26, 2017, Onfroy was released from jail on a $50,000 bail while facing charges of robbery and assault with a deadly weapon. His trial for the domestic violence and witness tampering charges was originally going to take place in May 2017 and was pushed back several times, and was set to take place on October 5, 2017.

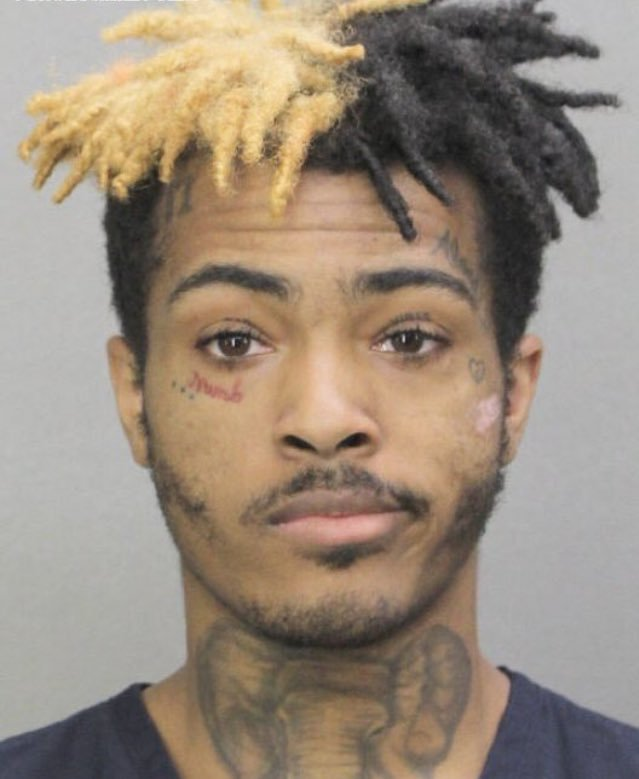
Mugshot of Onfroy in August 2016

On September 8, 2017, Pitchfork leaked the testimony of the alleged victim in Onfroy's case. The trial was then delayed again with a date of December 11, 2017, announced. Controversy arose once again following Onfroy's choice to donate $100,000 to domestic violence prevention programs, and then further when Onfroy announced an event to support rape victims though it was later canceled due to vandalism.

Onfroy's trial was delayed again after an affidavit was filed by Onfroy's ex-girlfriend Geneva Ayala, the alleged victim in the case, asking for the charges to be "completely dropped". She also declined to testify in court, making the battery charges being dropped or an acquittal of Onfroy on the charges more likely. In reaction, the prosecution moved to split the domestic violence and witness tampering case into two, with additional witness tampering charges being filed against Onfroy and a new trial date announced for December 15, 2017. Despite this, sources close to Ayala said the letter was genuine and that she wanted to move on. Ayala revealed after Onfroy's death that she was against Onfroy receiving prison time.

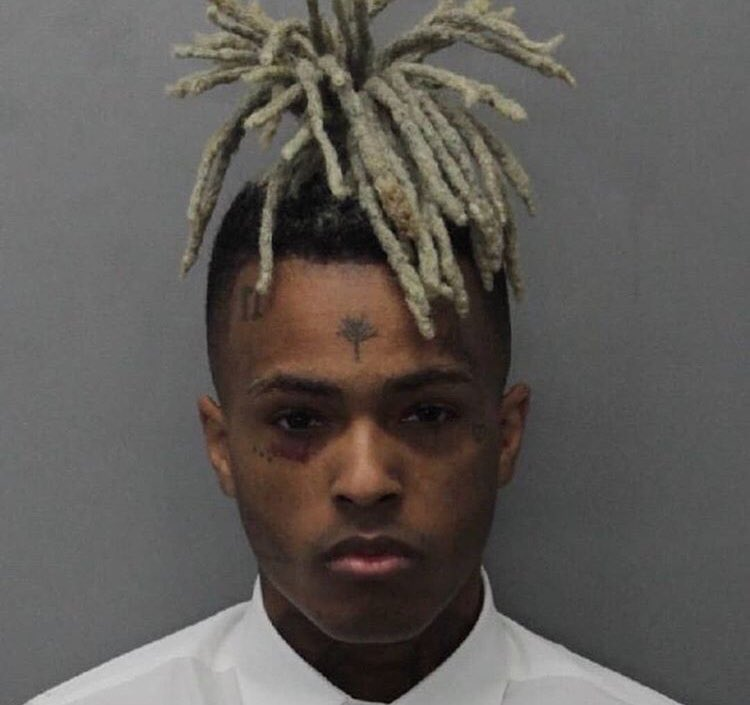
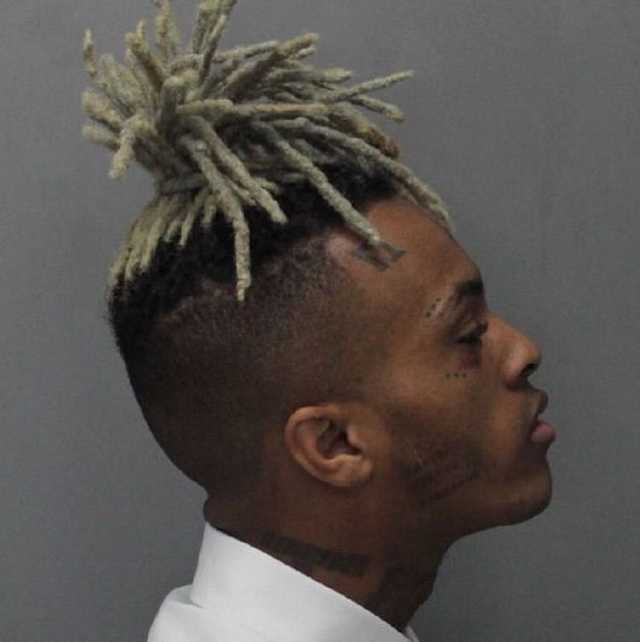
Onfroy's mugshot in December 2017

On December 10, 2017, Onfroy posted a message to Instagram, writing "Court date is on the 15th 9:00 am here is my court information, if I am taken into custody, I want to tell everyone I've let down I apologize, I tried my best, I really did ..."; he then released the information of the court hearing.

Onfroy pleaded not guilty on December 14, 2017, and was taken into pretrial custody after a motion was filed by the prosecution on the grounds of Onfroy having violated his bond. He was held without bail. It was confirmed on December 20, 2017, that Onfroy was being released on house arrest. Onfroy was released from house arrest on March 21, 2018.

Onfroy's lead attorney, J. David Bogenschutz said after Onfroy's death that he believed Onfroy would have avoided a prison sentence and would have instead been sentenced to probation if he was convicted of any of the charges, since the judge presiding over the case, Richard Hersch, had appeared to begin to look more favorably upon him, even granting him permission to go on tour. Hersch had also issued a gag order on recordings related to Onfroy's case while it was ongoing. Onfroy's domestic violence charges, which he was awaiting trial for, were voluntarily dropped by the prosecution following his death.

In 2019, documents and audio of phone calls that Onfroy made to his mother from jail were released, in which Onfroy claimed that his ex-girlfriend may have not been pregnant and claimed that it was his female friends who beat Ayala for getting Onfroy sent to a "mental asylum". Onfroy had been involuntarily hospitalized under Florida's Baker Act in 2016 after Ayala and Onfroy's roommates reported to police that he had attempted suicide.

=== Controversy over Snapchat video, false accusation threats, and defamation lawsuit ===
Shortly after being released from house arrest, a Snapchat video surfaced of Onfroy hitting a girl, Breonna Starling, in 2013 when he was 15. Onfroy's attorneys claimed the video, which features a caption written by Starling that sardonically reads "I hate this nigga" along with Onfroy dancing to some music before striking the girl, was "obviously . . . in jest".

Onfroy claimed afterwards that he was afraid he was going to be financially extorted by Starling and that members of her family had already called him requesting money. Starling came forward several days later saying she was "terrified for her life"; however, according to TMZ, Onfroy intended to sue Starling for fraud and defamation after her family demanded a large sum of money in exchange for her silence.

According to the legal complaint against Starling, after the video appeared on Reddit, Onfroy's manager, Solomon Sobande, messaged Starling on Instagram, stating to her, "Hey, this is Solomon, [Onfroy's] manager. Please get back to me at your earliest convenience." A few hours later, Sobande received a call from Starling. She stated to Sobande, "I already know why you're calling. I don't know why everyone is making a big deal out of this video. We were only playing around, and that video was years ago. What the hell is wrong with people?" Sobande asked Starling if she could release a statement stating what she had said in the call, and she immediately agreed. A few hours later, Sobande received a phone call from the same number, but Starling's grandparents were the ones on the phone. They said they were extremely upset with the video, and after Sobande had stated that she told him that the video was in jest, they denied Starling having stated that. After the call, Starling blocked Sobande on Instagram. The complaint alleged that Starling, her grandparents, and an attorney had discussed the potential of the video for them to receive great financial gain, and demanded $300,000 in exchange for Starling's silence, and additionally threatened to falsely accuse Onfroy of brandishing a BB gun prior to the video. Additionally, the complaint stated that Starling had changed her tone after learning of Onfroy's ongoing criminal domestic violence case with Ayala, threatening to hold a press conference to "show the world how violent Onfroy is."

Starling later released a statement admitting that the version of events described by Onfroy and his team were correct, and that she "hope[d] that people see the video in the playful context in which it was recorded and nothing more". After Starling's admission, Onfroy dropped his lawsuit against her.

=== Leaked audio regarding domestic violence and a stabbing incident ===
On October 23, 2018, Pitchfork released secretly recorded audio of 18-year-old Onfroy talking with acquaintances around the time of his October 8, 2016, arrest. Pitchfork alleged that he had confessed to domestic violence in the recording and described an incident in which he stabbed eight people. The tape was considered a confession by the prosecution and defense. An extended version of the audio later released included moments after when Onfroy clarified in regards to his ex-girlfriend, "I didn't touch her. I forgave her."

One especially fraught conversation about Onfroy's ex-girlfriend took place on the afternoon of October 26, 2016, when he told a woman, "I already got what I wanted, I already bashed her face—her face on the internet, bruh, I done made her look bad on the internet, bruh." Later that day, an audio clip from the call was posted on Instagram of Onfroy saying he "bashed her face" without the hurried clarification.

On the later released full version of the recording, Onfroy is heard saying that he has "no pride looking in the mirror" and that he "disgusts himself" for not being able to control his anger. Onfroy said that he used to "fuck [his ex-girlfriend] up" for cheating on him, but from then on he forgave her and would not touch her again. Some have tried to claim that when Onfroy said he used to "fuck her up" he meant "mentally". Rolling Stone journalist and author Jonathan Reiss said in his biography of Onfroy that this claim is "illogical in context."

Onfroy went on in the recording to describe the trauma he had experienced, from witnessing someone's tongue being cut out, to witnessing someone being raped, and someone attempting to kill his mother. Pitchfork faced criticism for not including these details of Onfroy's trauma and remorse in their article on the recording. Jonathan Reiss said that Pitchfork "presented [the recording] out of context and carefully chose the most damning portion that they could find."

Pitchfork also faced criticism for their interpretation of the stabbing incident that Onfroy described, as it was argued by some that he and his friend were about to be ambushed and that he acted in self-defense. It was revealed later that Onfroy appeared to have indeed acted in self-defense, as a video of the incident showed that he and his friend, record producer Khaed were about to be attacked by around twenty-five to forty people surrounding them.

== Personal life ==
Onfroy had five half-siblings: four on his father's side, an older sister named Ariana, a younger brother named Corey, a younger brother named Givon, and a sister named Ayla; and one on his mother's side, a younger brother named Aiden. In the mid-2010s, Onfroy lived in Florida with rapper Denzel Curry and producer Ronny J. Before his death, Onfroy was moving into a 6,000-square-foot (560 m^{2}) mansion in Parkland, which he bought in November 2017 for US$1.4 million. At the time of his death, Onfroy lived with his girlfriend Jenesis Sanchez. The couple owned three cats and two dogs.

Onfroy had been friends with a number of rappers and musicians, including Ski Mask the Slump God, Lil Uzi Vert, PnB Rock, Denzel Curry, Lil Yachty, Trippie Redd, Juice Wrld, and Billie Eilish. Billie Eilish claimed in an interview that Onfroy was able to talk her out of a plan to attempt suicide.

Fellow emo rapper Trippie Redd briefly ended his association with Onfroy once details of the allegations against Onfroy surfaced. After the falling out, Onfroy stated at a concert that he understood why Trippie Redd refused to associate with him, saying, "Not that long ago I was a piece of shit. I will tell you all personally I was a piece of shit person, bro. And I can admit that, bro. I was not a good person. But I've been trying my best to change myself." Onfroy said that he still believed Trippie Redd was an "amazing artist" and proceeded to perform their song, "Fuck Love". Trippie Redd accepted his apology and responded on Instagram, "It takes a real man to speak on shit and really apologize for their actions... I also apologize for anything I've said about you."

In February 2018, Onfroy posted on Instagram that he was preparing to return to school. In March 2018, he announced that he was getting his GED, which he completed according to his death certificate, and going to community college. Onfroy was public about his struggle with depression.

=== Relationships ===
Onfroy met Geneva Ayala in November 2014. The two began communicating when Onfroy messaged Ayala saying that he wanted to fight her boyfriend after her boyfriend had allegedly posted scantily clad photos of her without her consent, though a fight never occurred. Ayala's at-the-time boyfriend alleged that she had punched and slapped him during breakdowns she had, though he admitted he had slapped her back occasionally to "snap her out of it". Ayala was evicted from her mother's house when she was 16 and she had been living with her at-the-time boyfriend until they split. In 2016, Ayala moved in with Onfroy and his roommates.

Ayala had accused Onfroy of domestic abuse. According to Ayala's statement, Onfroy beat her at times, choked her, broke clothes hangers on her legs, threatened to chop off her hair or cut out her tongue, pressed knives or scissors to her face, and held her head underwater in their bathroom while promising to drown her. Ayala stated, "His favorite thing was to just backhand my mouth. That always left welts inside my lips."

The first incident of domestic violence allegedly occurred when Onfroy slapped Ayala and broke her iPhone 6S, because she had complimented a male friend on his new jewelry. Onfroy later repaired the phone. In one incident recounted to a prosecutor, Ayala said Onfroy asked her which object she wanted him to force into her vagina: a long-handled barbecue fork, or a wire barbecue brush, she chose the fork and Onfroy told her to undress. She claimed Onfroy was lightly dragging the tool against her inner thigh when she was asleep; he did not penetrate her with it. Ayala stated that once she woke up, Onfroy started apologizing to her profusely for the incident. Following the alleged incidents, Ayala started a GoFundMe page, claiming she needed surgery for damage to her left eye. She raised over $32,000, including $5,000 being donated by Onfroy. The fundraiser was temporarily suspended by GoFundMe due to allegations of fraud. It was never confirmed whether Ayala had the surgery done.

Ayala said that Onfroy often guilted her with near-attempts at suicide. Ayala said he used to fill a bathtub with water then fetch the microwave and dangle it over, threatening to let go. Another time he allegedly dangled himself from a 12th-story balcony by his legs and threatened suicide again after learning that Ayala had cheated on him during his time in jail. A witness to the incident stated that Ayala began to "box" Onfroy's face after the incident, to which Ayala admitted, but said that it was the only time she hit Onfroy. After Onfroy's death, Ayala said in regards to those discussing her accusations against Onfroy, "It's disgusting that people are speaking for me." Responding to those who criticized her for mourning Onfroy after his death, Ayala said on her Instagram story, "Did y'all know him? No, y'all did not. I knew who the fuck he was... I still fucking love him. I lost someone very dear to me and I can grieve whenever the fuck I fucking want to." Onfroy maintained his innocence publicly until his death.

Roommates of both Onfroy and Ayala describe Onfroy's remorse after the alleged incidents, and say that Onfroy said he "badly wanted to control his anger". This included an occasion where Onfroy was described as falling to his knees and weeping, begging to himself for his behavior to change. Some psychologists have speculated that Onfroy may have suffered from an attachment disorder stemming from the absence of his mother and father during childhood, which could have made him prone to uncontrollable violent outbursts. Onfroy was re-diagnosed with bipolar disorder as an adult after initially being diagnosed as a child. Onfroy had been seeing a therapist and began taking medication by the time of his death.

On December 31, 2017, Onfroy entered a relationship with Jenesis Sanchez, which eventually became a domestic partnership. Sanchez said that in their relationship Onfroy showed changes in controlling his anger and would simply leave if an argument ensued, rather than ever being physical. Onfroy began saying that he saw his deceased friend, Jocelyn Flores as his "guardian angel" and that it helped him to make better decisions in his relationship. Three days after his death, Onfroy's mother announced on Instagram that Sanchez was pregnant with his child. In an interview, Sanchez said Onfroy was notified three weeks before he died. The baby was confirmed to be a boy on August 22, 2018, and was born on January 26, 2019, three days after what would have been his father's 21st birthday. He was named Gekyume, at Onfroy's request.

A couple of weeks after Sanchez requested Onfroy's DNA samples to prove the paternity of her son, Onfroy's mother filed to block the test. Onfroy's mother sealed her court filings in opposition, so it is unclear why she objects to a paternity test. Some fans suspect it has something to do with her financial stake in Onfroy's estate. On May 15, 2019, Sanchez won the legal battle and a Florida judge granted access to a DNA sample from Onfroy.

=== Religious and spiritual beliefs ===
Onfroy, who was raised a Christian, had a well-documented interest in the occult. Miami New Times journalist Tarpley Hitt, who conducted one of few mainstream media interviews with him, reflected that he spent most of the two-hour conversation speaking on the subject at the expense of answering questions on his childhood or criminal charges. Housemates from his time living with the pornographic actor Bruno Dickemz recalled that he had a collection of books on occult and took part in rituals. While living there, his former partner Geneva Ayala pretended to be demonically possessed as a way to scare him out of their turbulent relationship, but it instead fascinated him. He was inspired by Austrian philosopher Rudolf Steiner's anthroposophy philosophy and its teachings about consciousness.

On his XXL Freshman cypher and his track "I Spoke to the Devil in Miami, He Said Everything Would Be Fine", Onfroy mentioned selling his soul to Satan; when questioned by DJ Akademiks on the subject, he refused to answer, concerned that he could encourage "kids going down that dark path". Additionally, on his track "Daemons", Onfroy discusses a revenge fantasy against Jesus and God for allowing atrocities in the world, while expressing skepticism about the existence of God. Specifically, Onfroy describes seeking revenge upon God for allowing his uncle's mental suffering. Onfroy's uncle died from suicide by hanging when Onfroy was a child.

Onfroy believed in reincarnation, picturing the cycle of death and rebirth as ending when one lives a life without harming others; he believed he had failed in this due to his violence. He was fascinated by the New Age concept of Indigo children, which may have been the reason for his attraction toward the color blue in the final months before his death.

== Political and social views ==
Onfroy was public about his political and personal beliefs throughout his career. In 2016, Onfroy opposed the presidential candidacy of Donald Trump and had instead signaled support for Democratic candidate Bernie Sanders. He also took to Twitter predicting a Trump victory, saying, "As much as I hate that piece of shit Donald Trump, y'all know this motherfucker's gonna win right?" He also stated that, although he did not hold a positive opinion of Democratic nominee Hillary Clinton, describing her as "garbage", he did not want Trump to win because, "Once Trump gets in its over for all the minorities pretty much... the lower classes are gonna be fucked." His songs "Hate Will Never Win" and "Suicide Pit" contain anti-Trump lyrics.

Onfroy said he believed that, "If weed was legal everywhere, the world would be a better place", and voiced support for criminal justice reform movements, stating that "the judicial system is slavery." Onfroy was anti-war and spoke out against President Trump's decision to launch a missile strike on Syria in April 2017.

Despite previously expressing opposition to gun control measures, Onfroy reversed his stance on the issue following the 2018 Stoneman Douglas High School shooting in Parkland, Florida. Onfroy held multiple charity events for the March for Our Lives movement and visited Parkland survivor Anthony Borges in the hospital while Borges was recovering from gunshot wounds.

Onfroy was characterized by much of the media as homophobic following a widely seen interview he gave to Adam22 in April 2016. Onfroy told Adam22 that, one time when he was in a juvenile detention facility, he attacked his gay cellmate for staring at him while naked. Onfroy explained, "I was gonna kill him type shit because of what he did", but was ultimately restrained. After Onfroy's death, Liz Lazzara's article for CNN described him as homophobic, and similar characterizations were made on social media. However, friends and collaborators said he was not homophobic. In the same interview, Onfroy stated in clarification, "I am not homophobic", and expressed his support for the legalization of gay marriage. In a 2017 interview with The Fader which was released in November 2022, Onfroy mentioned that he should have been clearer in the podcast in which he described the fight, stating he wished he had clarified that he did not attack his cellmate for the fact that he was gay, calling his discussion of the topic "negligent and stupid", but stated, "Everybody needs to realize at the time I was still a kid." Regarding his political beliefs, Onfroy was praised as "incredibly progressive" by transgender music producer Fifty Grand. Multiple transgender artists said in a 2020 biography that Onfroy was supportive of the transgender community.

Onfroy said many times that he distrusted police due to both personal experiences and publicized instances such as the killing of Philando Castile, which Onfroy described as a murder. In the music video for "Riot", depictions of the killings of Emmett Till, Heather Heyer, and Philando Castile are shown, in addition to the fictional depiction at the end of the video of a white child being lynched. Onfroy said that the last depiction wasn't an expression of reverse racism, but was to show that public outrage from the video would be more so focused on the fictional white child's death rather than the depictions of actual racist killings. Onfroy expressed frustration in a 2017 interview that the officer who killed Eric Garner was not arrested.

During the Revenge concert tour, Onfroy had publicly declared his support for civil rights and gay rights, and denounced racist and homophobic rhetoric from hate groups such as the KKK, saying, "I don't give a fuck if you're black, white, yellow, purple—I don't give a fuck if you're gay, I don't give a fuck if you're straight, I give a fuck if you're a person... I stand for equality for all people."

== Murder and trial ==
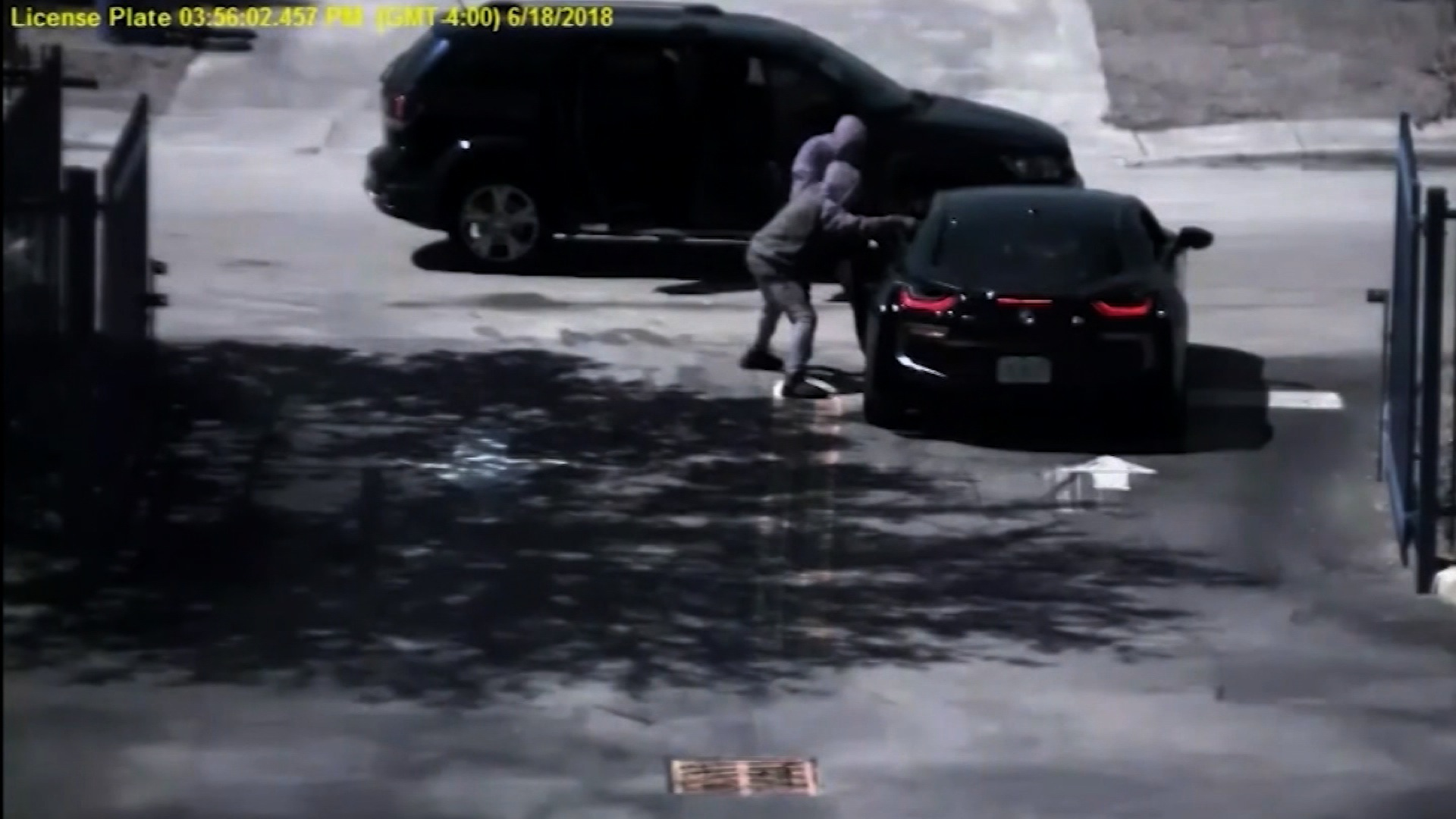
Michael Boatwright and Trayvon Newsome confronting Onfroy in his vehicle

On June 18, 2018, Onfroy and his step-uncle Leonard Kerr, upon leaving Riva Motorsports Motorcycle & Marine Superstore in Deerfield Beach, Florida, were blocked from exiting the parking lot by a black Dodge Journey SUV in a premeditated attack. Two armed men exited the SUV and approached the rapper while he was sitting in the driver's seat. A brief struggle occurred and the armed men reached inside Onfroy's vehicle, stole a small Louis Vuitton bag containing US$50,000 and shot Onfroy multiple times. The shooters fled the scene in their SUV. Onfroy was taken by paramedics to the nearby Broward Health North hospital in Deerfield Beach, where he was pronounced dead.

Onfroy's death was announced by the Broward County Sheriff's Office at 5:30 pm. Dedrick Devonshay Williams of Pompano Beach was arrested two days after the shooting and held in the Broward County jail. He was charged with dangerous and depraved murder, which was later upgraded to premeditated murder. In the weeks following the event, triggerman Michael Boatwright and accomplice Robert Allen were arrested and charged with premeditated first-degree murder for their involvement. The third accomplice, Trayvon Newsome, was arrested and charged with premeditated first-degree murder in August 2018. On August 12, 2022, Allen pleaded guilty to the lesser conviction of second-degree murder in exchange for testimony against the other three defendants. Their trial initiated on February 7, 2023. All three remaining perpetrators were found guilty on all counts. Williams and Newsome were sentenced to life in prison without the possibility of parole, and Boatwright received two consecutive life sentences without parole, plus an additional consecutive 30 years. Allen was sentenced to seven years in prison with credit for time served, with a consecutive 20-year probation sentence. On October 26, 2023, Allen was released from prison and is on probation as of November 27, 2023.

In his will, Onfroy named his mother Cleopatra, his half brother Aiden, and his half brother Corey as the sole beneficiaries of his estate. Onfroy's future child was not named in the will, as it was written before the pregnancy.

=== Funeral ===
An open casket service for Onfroy took place at the BB&T Center in Sunrise, Florida, on June 27, 2018, where fans were allowed to pay their respects. His private funeral took place on June 28, 2018, where rappers Lil Uzi Vert and Lil Yachty and singer Erykah Badu were among the attendees. He was entombed in a mausoleum at Gardens of Boca Raton Memorial Park, Boca Raton, Florida.

== Legacy ==
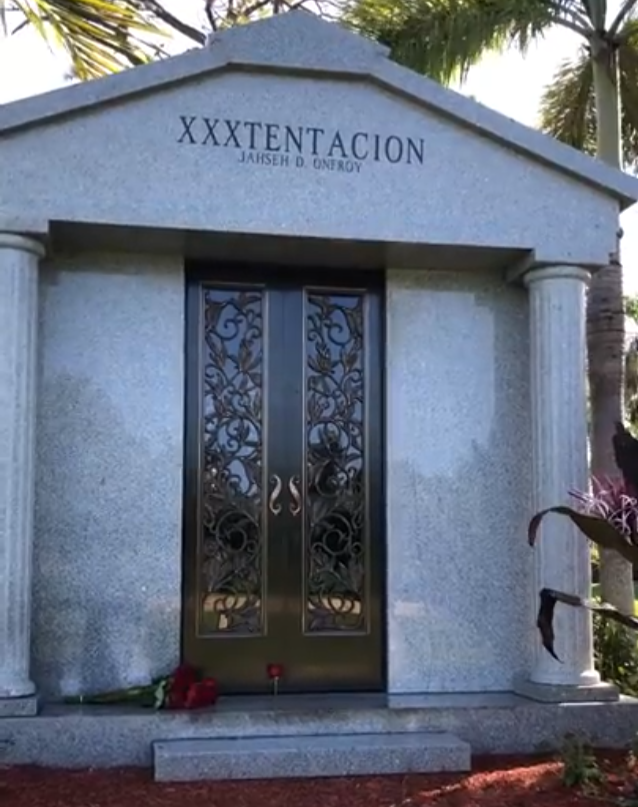
Onfroy's mausoleum in August 2018

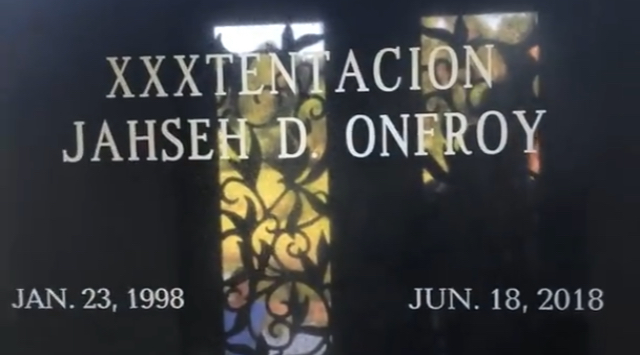
Onfroy's tombstone at Gardens of Boca Raton Memorial Park in Boca Raton, Florida

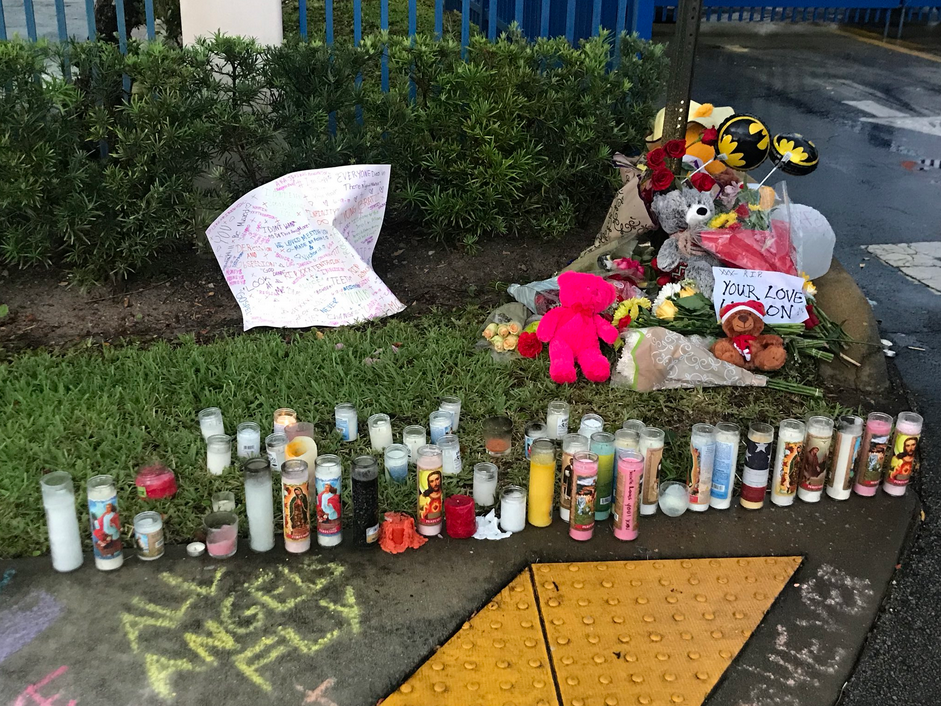
A memorial outside the dealership where XXXTentacion was shot and killed

Onfroy's music was driven on themes revolving around depression and alienation, becoming known for his "depressing, and at times devastating" music that brought attention to mental health. He employed styles and techniques that were unconventional in hip-hop during his career, such as distortion and heavy guitar-backed instrumentals drawing inspiration from third-wave emo.

Christopher Weingarten of Rolling Stone opined that Onfroy's success as "a zeitgeist-grabbing, industry-defying, boundary-destroying phenomenon" is "overshadowed" by his alleged violence towards his ex-girlfriend, but contended that despite media attempts to suppress him, Onfroy's "impact on music will be felt for years to come" and his recordings have "helped signal a new era of post-streaming, post-genre teenagers". Onfroy left behind what Rolling Stone called "a huge musical footprint" due to his impact on his young fan base and his popularity during his career. Given his immense influence only to die young, the article compared his cultural impact with that of Ritchie Valens and Darby Crash. Chris Willman of Variety described in a 2022 article that while Onfroy was a flawed individual, during his career he "nearly became rap's own Kurt Cobain", and mentioned that it was "heartbreaking" to see Onfroy killed just as he began to show signs of "warmth, self-awareness and a desire to help".

Highlighting his ambivalent public reception during his short career, Billboard wrote:

"The provocative and polarizing artist seemed to thrive on controversy as much as art, often blurring the lines between shocking reality and button-pushing creativity. XXX's short career was characterized by both in equal measure-making the Florida rapper a martyr to a legion of fans and a cautionary tale to so many others."

On June 18, 2019, exactly one year on from Onfroy's death, an official documentary on his life was announced; it featured footage of Onfroy from around April 2017 telling biographical details. On February 2, 2022, it was announced that the film, titled Look at Me, would be released on the Hulu streaming service on May 26, 2022.

Onfroy has RIAA-certified sales of 110 million units in the US and BPI-certified sales of over 13 million units in the UK. He is also one of the Top-20 all-time best selling artists in terms of digital singles, with a total of 49 million RIAA-certified digital sales as of October 2020. In August 2021, Onfroy's single, "Sad!", was certified Diamond in the US.

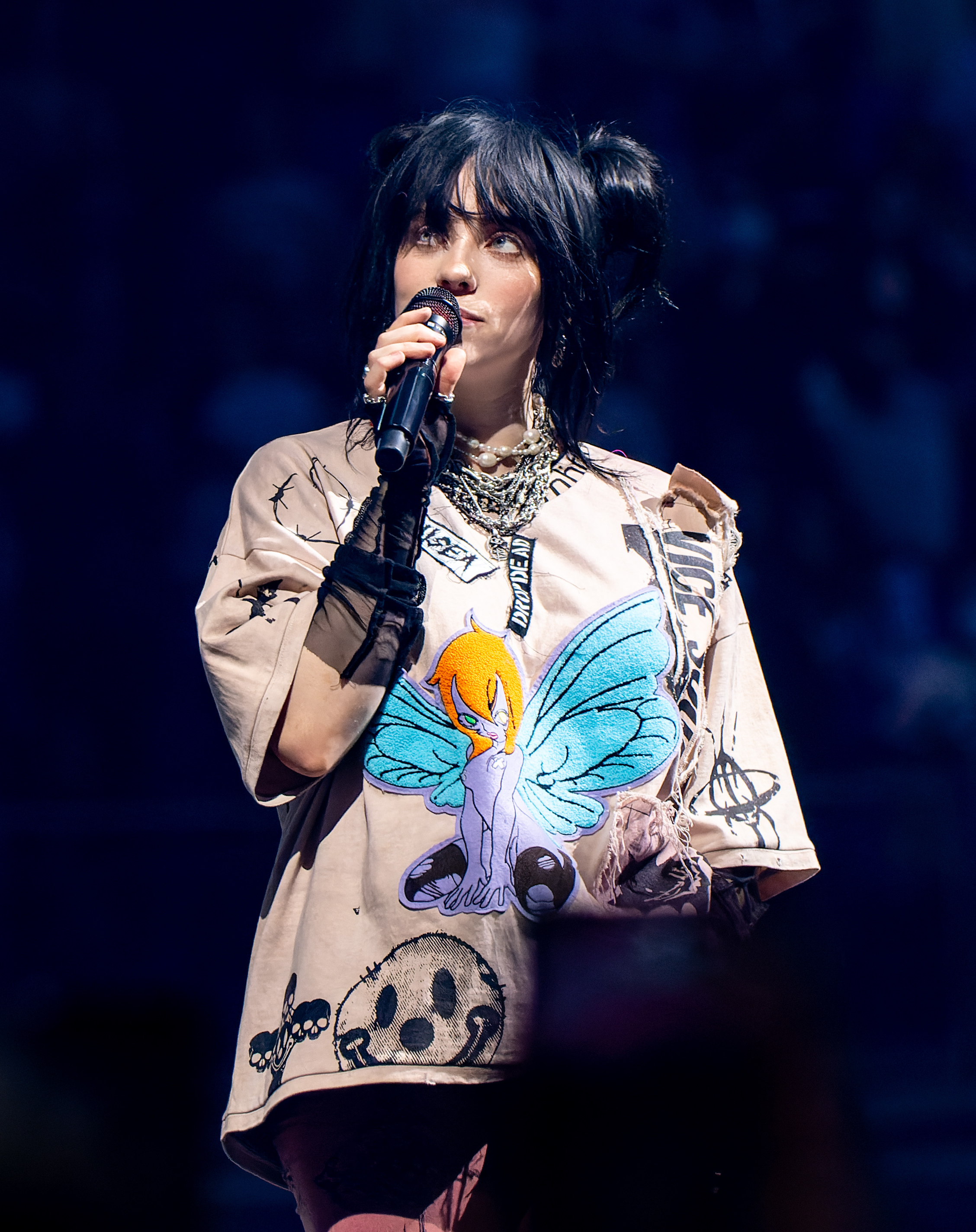
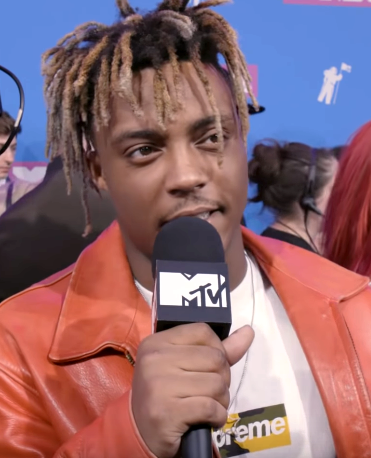
Artists such as Billie Eilish and Juice Wrld have cited XXXTentacion as a musical influence.

Onfroy has been cited as an influence by a number of artists, including Billie Eilish, Juice Wrld, Kendrick Lamar, Lil Nas X, Trippie Redd, Baby Keem, and Kanye West.

As of February 2024, Onfroy's last Instagram post before his death holds the record of the 11th most-liked Instagram post of all-time with 32.5 million likes.

According to YouGov polling as of July 2023, a majority of Americans have heard of Onfroy. A plurality of Americans view him positively, with 56 percent of Americans who have heard of him holding a positive opinion, and 19 percent holding a negative opinion. 52 percent of respondents said they have heard of Onfroy. He is most famous and popular among Millennials and Generation Z, with 75 percent having heard of him and 65 percent of those holding a positive opinion. He is known by 43 percent of Generation X and 24 percent of Baby Boomers.

In the years following his death, Onfroy was increasingly cited as an influential figure in the development of rage rap, with artists such as Trippie Redd crediting him for his influence on the genre, particularly through his distorted production, high-energy performances and experimental approach to trap music, alongside artists like Playboi Carti and Lil Uzi Vert, who helped popularize the sound.

=== Controversy ===
Onfroy's personal life and history are noted as prominent parts of his legacy. An article in The Guardian described his legacy in more critical terms, stating that "He will be remembered mostly for the unusually cruel violence he committed on vulnerable people, particularly his ex-girlfriend, crimes for which he never expressed remorse." Mutual friends of both Onfroy and his ex-girlfriend dispute this narrative, recalling times when he had broken down in remorse. According to the article, his music "reflected a life lived with disregard for humanity, both other people's and his own" and rarely attempted to engage in bravado or bragging, instead focusing on "mental illness, suicide, extreme misogyny, and a prevailing feeling of numbness", though acknowledging that Onfroy "made some attempts to rehabilitate his image."

In an article for The Atlantic, Hannah Giorgis expressed similar criticisms, though she also noted that Onfroy "reminded young fans in particular that their hurt was valid but that it did not form the sum total of their lives" and that he "gave voice to their insecurities." Contrasting these elements of his legacy, Giorgis acknowledged that though Onfroy spent his career encouraging young fans to recognize their greater worth, she believed his legacy is nonetheless characterized by the trauma he both experienced and caused.

In The Washington Post, Chris Richards commented on Onfroy's complicated legacy, contrasting how he "encouraged his fans to find hope in the fog of their despair, but bragged enthusiastically about the joy he felt in brutalizing others." According to Richards, Onfroy's music "brought solace to the depressed" while validating the sort of violence he practiced, and legitimized the pain of his fans while erasing the suffering of domestic violence victims. Onfroy's music serves as an example for Richards of how "a hateful song" might normalize such feelings in "hateful people", which contributes to the profound paranoia in society about the hatred that might be in the minds of others.

In an article for Vibe, while acknowledging Onfroy's controversial history, Shenequa Golding criticized those celebrating his murder. Golding commented in response to these reactions, "Jahseh was 20 years old, which means five years ago, he was 15, and 10 years ago, he was 10. His death has required that we be the bigger person and acknowledge and respect that his life was taken, even though he didn't offer the same courtesy through his music and actions... if this 20-year-old was killed, and some of us find joy in that, how much have we exfoliated away at our own empathy and humanity? How raw have we become?" Golding stated that although she would not condone Onfroy's past actions, "he should at least earn your silence, because being delighted and vocal about his untimely death, despite his horrid past, is just wrong."

In an article for Slate, Jack Hamilton shared similar sentiments to Golding, warning of the slippery slope of moral absolutism in the wake of Onfroy's death, calling those celebrating his murder "self-righteous" and stating, "I have trouble mining any feelings of superiority or 'justice' from the killing of a 20-year-old, no matter what he did in his life." Hamilton added that he disagreed with the notion that Onfroy was irredeemable, "but now he'll never have a chance." Hamilton also cautioned against demonizing Onfroy's fans, writing, "Those people just lost an artist who was important to them, who spoke to and for them when no one else seemed to, who just died in an act of brutal violence, and almost all of us of at any age know what that's like."

Jordan Bassett of NME additionally shared a similar point of view to that of Golding and Hamilton, writing, "[Onfroy] was exposed to unspeakable violence in his past; we know patterns of abuse repeat themselves. This of course is not an attempt to excuse the things he did, but it does suggest they were the actions of a damaged child, rather than the twisted bogeyman he was depicted as on social media." In an interview with NME, rapper and singer Juice Wrld gave a defense of Onfroy, commenting, "Everybody has their mistakes. A mistake is a mistake. Some are more severe than others, but we're no one to judge the severity of someone's mistake. As long as we doin' wrong, as long as we sinnin', you can't judge nobody else's mistakes."

Rolling Stone journalist and author Jonathan Reiss, who authored a 2020 biography of Onfroy, criticized the media's portrayal of Onfroy, saying, "They bundled his sins into listicles and timelines, partaking in an almost gluttonous level of hatred. They made a monster and sold it." Reiss also wrote, "One of the saddest outcomes of losing X so young is that he never got to take responsibility for his actions, but given all he did in that last year and how far he'd come, it's not far-fetched to imagine that he may have." Reiss commented on Onfroy's legacy in more favorable terms, writing, "If being a fan of Onfroy or Jahseh Onfroy could mean being a believer in second chances and the power of redemption... that would be a hell of a powerful legacy."

Onfroy's ex-girlfriend Geneva Ayala, who had accused him of domestic abuse in 2016, said of the controversy surrounding her and Onfroy's past, "It's disgusting that people are speaking for me. I don't care if no one cared about me however many months ago, I didn't lose my life. He did. It's permanent. I'm still here. Like, how do you think that makes me feel? Everyone expecting me to be relieved or happy? No, I'm broken." Following Onfroy's death, Ayala appeared in the music video and the cover art for the 2019 single "Hearteater".

== Discography ==
Studio albums

- 17 (2017)
- ? (2018)
- Skins (2018)
- Bad Vibes Forever (2019)

Collaborative albums

- Members Only, Vol. 4 (2019) (as part of Members Only)

== Filmography ==
Year	Title	Role	Ref.
2022	Look at Me	Himself (archival footage)	
2022	In His Own Words	Himself (archival footage)	

== Concert tours ==
=== Headlining ===
- The Revenge Tour (2017)
- A Helping Hand (2018)

== Awards and nominations ==
=== American Music Awards ===
Year	Nominee / work	Award	Result	Ref.
2018	XXXTentacion	New Artist of the Year	Nominated	
2018	17	Favorite Album – Soul/R&B	Won	

=== BET Hip Hop Awards ===
Year	Nominee / work	Award	Result	Ref.
2018	XXXTentacion	Best New Hip Hop Artist	Won	

=== Billboard Music Awards ===
Year	Nominee / work	Award	Result	Ref.
2018	17	Top R&B Album	Nominated	

== See also ==
- List of murdered hip-hop musicians

== Notes ==
=== Sources ===
- Reiss, Jonathan (2020), Look at Me! The XXXTentacion Story, Hachette, ISBN 978-0-306-84541-3
- Kobek, Jarett (2018), Do Every Thing Wrong! XXXTentacion Against the World, We Heard You Like Books, ISBN 978-0-692-03998-4
