= The Revenge Tour =

2017 concert tour by XXXTentacion

- Tour by XXXTentacion
- Promotional poster for the Los Angeles show
- Location: 5 in California; 2 in Texas; 1 each in Arizona, Colorado, Florida, Idaho, Illinois, Michigan, Minnesota, New Mexico, Oregon, Utah, Washington, and Wisconsin
- Associated albums: Revenge and 17
- Start date: May 31, 2017
- End date: July 2, 2017
- No. of shows: 19
- Supporting acts: Ski Mask the Slump God; Members Only

The Revenge Tour was the only concert tour by American rapper XXXTentacion in support of his second mixtape, Revenge (2017), and partially in support of his then-upcoming debut studio album, 17 (2017). It traveled across the United States in fourteen different states. The tour started on May 31, 2017, in Houston, Texas and ended on July 2, 2017, in Pompano Beach, Florida. The tour was supported by XXXTentacion's hip hop collective, Members Only, which included fellow rappers such as Ski Mask the Slump God, Craig Xen, and Wifisfuneral. While he made multiple concert appearances following the Revenge Tour, it was his only ever solo concert tour as he was murdered a year later. The tour was subjected to multiple controversies.

== Background ==
XXXTentacion revealed the Revenge Tour as his first headlining tour in April 2017 and tickets went up for sale later in the month. It represented his second mixtape Revenge and promoted his upcoming debut album, 17. The dates were set from May 31 to July 2. The tour was temporarily postponed midway due to the shooting of X's cousin.

=== Incidents ===
The Revenge Tour was the subject of multiple controversial incidents. On the first date of the tour on May 31 in Houston, Members Only rapper Wifisfuneral was assaulted after a failed attempt at crowdsurfing in the audience. X asked the crowd who was responsible for the attack, but did not receive an answer. Wifisfuneral was briefly hospitalized, but made a recovery and went on to attend the remainder of the tour.

On June 7, while in the middle of performing, X was sucker punched in the head by an assailant at a stop in San Diego and was left unconscious for a short time. Security recommended to X that he cancel the remainder of the show, and he obliged. At the time of the incident, X had been involved in a dispute with local rapper Rob Stone, and speculation ensued that the attacker was associated with Stone. X and Stone later confirmed that they had spoken and that the tension between the two had been resolved. An audience member was also stabbed at the same concert stop and was hospitalized. No arrests were publicly reported.

On June 17, at a stop in Denver, X punched a fan after the fan had placed his hand directly upon X's chest. X claimed self-defense but apologized to the fan and admitted that he had overreacted. X later brought the fan on stage.

=== Political commentary ===
During the Revenge Tour, X routinely advocated for racial and gay rights, stating at one concert, "I don't give a fuck if you're black, white, yellow, purple—I don't give a fuck if you're gay, I don't give a fuck if you're straight, I give a fuck if you're a person... I stand for equality for all people," and initiated crowd chants of "fuck the KKK" and "fuck Donald Trump". X later criticized the media for their coverage of the tour, arguing that his advocacy for equal rights during the tour had not been covered as much as its controversies.

== Set list ==
This set list is representative of the average of 14 tour stops. It is not intended to represent all concerts for the duration of the tour.

1. "Take a Step Back"
2. "RIP Roach"
3. "What in XXXTarnation"
4. "Look at Me!"
5. "Wassup Bro!"
6. "Revenge"
7. "King"
8. "Crucify Thy Infant, Son of a Whore"
9. "Yung Bratz"
10. "Where's the Blow"
11. "Suicide Pit"
12. "ImSippinTeaInYoHood"
13. "Life is Short"
14. "ILoveItWhenTheyRun"
15. "I Spoke to the Devil in Miami, He Said Everything Would Be Fine"
16. "H2O"
17. "Bowser"
18. "Slipknot"

Encore

19. "Look at Me!"
20. "Take a Step Back"

== Shows ==
Date	City	Venue
May 31, 2017	Houston, Texas	House of Blues
June 1, 2017	Dallas, Texas	Gas Monkey Live
June 3, 2017	Albuquerque, New Mexico	Sunshine Theater
June 4, 2017	Scottsdale, Arizona	Livewire AZ
June 6, 2017	Los Angeles, California	The Novo
June 7, 2017	San Diego, California	The Observatory North Park
June 9, 2017	Santa Cruz, California	The Catalyst
June 10, 2017	San Francisco, California	The Regency Ballroom
June 11, 2017	Sacramento, California	Ace of Spades
June 13, 2017	Portland, Oregon	Roseland Theater
June 14, 2017	Seattle, Washington	The Showbox
June 15, 2017	Garden City, Idaho	Revolution Concert House & Event Center
June 16, 2017	Salt Lake City, Utah	The Grand at the Complex
June 17, 2017	Denver, Colorado	Ogden Theatre
June 19, 2017	Maplewood, Minnesota	Myth
June 20, 2017	Chicago, Illinois	Concert Music Hall
June 21, 2017	Milwaukee, Wisconsin	The Rave
June 22, 2017	Detroit, Michigan	Majestic Theatre
July 2, 2017	Pompano Beach, Florida	Club Cinema
