= WingRiddenAngel =

2015 song by XXXTentacion

Song by XXXTentacion

from the album Members Only, Vol. 2 and Look at Me: The Album
- Released: October 23, 2015 (SoundCloud); June 10, 2022 (Columbia re-release)
- Recorded: 2015
- Genre: Emo rap; spoken word
- Length: 2:46
- Label: Bad Vibes Forever; Columbia
- Songwriters: Jahseh Onfroy; Nicole Ann Bell; Kellen Hines
- Producers: XXXTentacion; Kellbender

"WingRiddenAngel" is a song by American rapper and singer XXXTentacion. It was originally released independently on SoundCloud and included on American hip hop collective Members Only second mixtape, Members Only, Vol.2 released on October 23, 2015, as the eighteenth track. The song was later re-released commercially as the fifth track on the posthumous compilation album, Look at Me: The Album released on June 10, 2022, through Bad Vibes Forever and Columbia Records.

The track was produced by XXXTentacion and Kellbender, and samples the song "Poacher's Pride" by Canadian singer Nicole Dollanganger. This song was described by XXL as one of X's "best deep cuts".

== Background ==
"WingRiddenAngel" was among XXXTentacion's early releases on SoundCloud and became one of his most notable tracks prior to his mainstream breakthrough.

In an analysis of the song, XXL described it as a standout early release and noted that it is written from the perspective of a man mourning a significant other who has died by suicide, highlighting its somber tone and themes of loss and grief. Following its release in October 2015, XXXTentacion stated on Twitter that he wrote the track as a tribute to a former partner who had supported him during difficult periods of his life.

== Personnel ==
Credits adapted from Apple Music.

- Jahseh Onfroy – performer, songwriter, producer
- Nicole Ann Bell – songwriter
- Kellen Hines – songwriter, producer

== Legacy ==
XXXTentacion had both "Wing Ridden Angel" and its acronym "W.R.A.C." tattooed on his right arm and phalanges of his right hand. Following his death in June 2018, fellow American rapper Denzel Curry had “Wing Ridden Angel” tattooed on his right forearm as a tribute. According to XXL and HotNewHipHop, the tattoo mirrored XXXTentacion's own ink and referenced the song of the same name.
