= Look at Me (2022 film) =

2022 documentary film

- Official release poster
- Directed by: Sabaah Folayan
- Produced by: Cleopatra Bernard; Chloe Campion; Bob Celestin; Darcy McKinnon; Solomon Sobande; Rob Stone
- Starring: XXXTentacion (archival footage); Geneva Ayala; Cleopatra Bernard; John Cunningham; Jenesis Sanchez; Ski Mask the Slump God; Solomon Sobande
- Edited by: Chris McNabb; Luis Carballar
- Music by: XXXTentacion
- Production company: Fader Films
- Distributed by: Hulu
- Release dates: March 15, 2022 (SXSW); May 26, 2022 (Hulu)
- Running time: 113 minutes
- Country: United States
- Language: English

Look at Me is a 2022 documentary film, directed by Sabaah Folayan. It focuses on the life and death of the rapper and singer-songwriter Jahseh Dwayne Ricardo Onfroy, known as XXXTentacion. The film's title is named after his breakthrough single. It premiered at the South by Southwest Film Festival on March 15, 2022, and was released on Hulu on May 26, 2022.

The film was first announced on June 18, 2019, the first anniversary of the murder of XXXTentacion. The film began production around April 2017. The documentary contains footage from X's last years, and contains appearances from numerous friends and family of his, including his mother Cleopatra Bernard, girlfriend Jenesis Sanchez, ex-girlfriend Geneva Ayala, and best friend and fellow rapper Ski Mask the Slump God. It also includes interviews with rappers from XXXTentacion's hip hop collective, Members Only such as Bass Santana, Cooliecut, and Kid Trunks. The documentary received widespread acclaim from critics and fans following its release.

On May 23, 2022, it was announced on by XXXTentacion's estate on his Instagram account that a compilation album, titled Look at Me: The Album would be released alongside the documentary. The album was released on June 10, 2022, and was preceded by the single "True Love" with Kanye West.

== Synopsis ==
The film overviews both favorable and controversial aspects of X's life and legacy.

The film features first-time interviews from X's ex-girlfriend, Geneva Ayala, who had accused him of domestic abuse in 2016. X was awaiting trial at the time of his death for charges stemming from the accusations levied by Ayala, who reveals for the first time in the documentary that she did not want X to go to jail in the first place, saying she "wasn't aware that it was all going to crumble down onto him like that." The film includes a meeting with X's mother, Cleopatra Bernard, and Ayala, in which Bernard said that she believes Ayala's accusations, commenting, "Jahseh was wrong for what he did. There's no excuse for that, period. But I just want the world to know that he wasn't that same person anymore, but the past is still part of his story." Bernard states that she believes X would have eventually publicly apologized to Ayala, but that, "He just never had a chance." Ayala commented that "a weight had finally been lifted by knowing that [X's] family doesn't hold a grudge against her." Commenting on the film, director Sabaah Folayan said, "We felt like having lost Jahseh so soon, the best thing that we can do was find a way to pull out the lessons of his life and to try to continue his mission."

== Cast ==
All star as themselves. Relation to XXXTentacion listed after each casting.

- XXXTentacion (archival footage)
- Geneva Ayala, ex-girlfriend
- Bass Santana, friend and collaborator
- Cleopatra Bernard, mother
- Cooliecut, friend and collaborator
- John Cunningham, producer
- Kid Trunks, friend and collaborator
- Jenesis Sanchez, girlfriend and mother of his son
- Ski Mask the Slump God, best friend and collaborator
- Solomon Sobande, manager

== Soundtrack ==
Look at Me: The Album is a compilation album that released alongside the documentary, which released on June 10, 2022. It was preceded by the release of a collaboration single with Kanye West entitled "True Love". The album is split into two halves, and contains only songs that have already been released in some capacity; some on prior albums, and some were previously SoundCloud exclusive.

== Reception ==
On the review aggregator website Rotten Tomatoes, 92% of 12 critics' reviews are positive, with an average rating of 8.0/10. Metacritic, which uses a weighted average, assigned the film a score of 75 out of 100, based on 4 critics, indicating "Generally favorable reviews".

== See also ==
- In His Own Words
- Everybody's Everything (film)
- Juice Wrld: Into the Abyss
