= Look at Me: The Album =

Compilation album by XXXTentacion
- Released: June 10, 2022
- Recorded: 2014–2018; 2021–2022
- Genre: Emo rap
- Length: 57:49
- Labels: Bad Vibes Forever; Columbia
- Producer: XXXTentacion • John Cunningham • STAIN • Ronny J • JakesAlive • Alasen • Fifty Grand • Kellbender • Willie G • Rojas On The Beat • Ojivolta • potsu • Robert Soukiasyan • Mike Dean • Aesthesys • Canis Major • Jimmy Duval • King Yosef • prxz • Optic Core • KHAED

XXXTentacion chronology
Bad Vibes Forever (2019)	Look at Me: The Album (2022)

Singles from Look at Me: The Album
- 1. "Vice City" Released: January 28, 2022; 2. "True Love" Released: May 27, 2022

Professional ratings
Review scores
Source	Rating
AllMusic	2.5/5 stars

Look at Me: The Album is the first and only compilation album by American rapper XXXTentacion. Announced alongside a documentary of the same name, the album was released posthumously on June 10, 2022, 8 days before the fourth anniversary of his death. Look at Me was supported by two singles: "Vice City" and "True Love", both of which were announced early on, being previously absent from streaming services due to sample clearance problems. The album features both Ski Mask the Slump God and Kanye West.

== Background ==
The album was originally announced on May 23, 2022, by XXXTentacion's estate on his social media, along with the announcement that "True Love" with Kanye West, which was previously on West's demo album, Donda 2, would be released as a single on streaming platforms on May 27, 2022. The full tracklist was revealed on XXXTentacion's social media on June 2, 2022.

The album features various songs from XXXTentacion's SoundCloud era, in addition to album tracks and singles from his mixtape Revenge (2017) and three of his studio albums, 17 (2017), ? (2018), and Skins (2018), including his breakthrough single, "Look at Me!", and his Diamond-certified single, "Sad!".

== Track listing ==
Look at Me: The Album track listing
No.	Title	Producer(s)	Length
1.	"Vice City"	Canis Major	3:40
2.	"Never"	XXXTentacion; Aesthesys	3:40
3.	"Rare"	XXXTentacion; Fifty Grand	1:35
4.	"Fuxk" (featuring Ski Mask the Slump God)	XXXTentacion; Willie G	2:41
5.	"WingRiddenAngel"	XXXTentacion; Kellbender	2:48
6.	"King of the Dead"	Fifty Grand; Hellion	3:39
7.	"Failure Is Not an Option (Interlude)"	King Yosef	0:51
8.	"#ImSippinTeaInYoHood"	Ronny J	2:55
9.	"I Spoke to the Devil in Miami, He Said Everything Would Be Fine"	XXXTentacion; Alasen; JakesAlive; Ronny J	3:02
10.	"Willy Wonka Was a Child Murderer"	Prxz; King Yosef	1:49
11.	"Kill Me (Pain from the Jail Phone)"	Fifty Grand; King Yosef	2:20
12.	"Look at Me!"	Rojas; Duval	2:06
13.	"I Don't Wanna Do This Anymore"	KHAED; Nova	1:27
14.	"Yung Bratz"	Stain	1:41
15.	"Jocelyn Flores"	Potsu	1:59
16.	"Depression & Obsession"	XXXTentacion	2:24
17.	"Everybody Dies in Their Nightmares"	Potsu	1:35
18.	"Alone, Part 3"	Cunningham; Robert Soukiasyan	1:49
19.	"Moonlight"	Cunningham	2:15
20.	"Sad!"	Cunningham	2:46
21.	"Changes"	XXXTentacion; Cunningham	2:01
22.	"Hope"	Cunningham	1:50
23.	"Before I Close My Eyes"	Cunningham	1:39
24.	"Train Food"	XXXTentacion; Cunningham	2:44
25.	"True Love" (with Kanye West)	Kanye West; Cunningham; Mark Williams; Raul Cubina; Michael Dean	2:28
Total length:			57:49

=== Notes ===
- "Vice City" is from XXX (Unmastered) (2014).
- "Never" is from The Fall (2014), Heartbreak Hotel (2015) & Willy Wonka Was a Child Murderer (2016).
- "Rare" is from ♡ ^{r a r e} ♡ (2014).
- "Fuxk" is from Members Only, Vol. 1 (2015).
- "WingRiddenAngel" and "King of the Dead" are from Members Only, Vol. 2 (2015).
- "WingRiddenAngel" is from "Heartbreak Hotel" (2015).
- "Willy Wonka Was a Child Murderer" is from Willy Wonka Was a Child Murderer (2016).
- "Look at Me", "I Don't Wanna Do This Anymore", and "Yung Bratz" are from Revenge (2017).
- "Yung Bratz" is from the 2016 version of Bad Vibes Forever.
- "Jocelyn Flores", "Depression & Obsesssion", and "Everybody Dies in Their Nightmares" are from 17 (2017).
- "Alone, Part 3", "Moonlight", "Sad!", "Changes", "Hope", and "Before I Close My Eyes" are from ? (2018).
- "Train Food" is from Skins (2018).
- "True Love" is from Donda 2 (2022).

== Charts ==
=== Weekly charts ===
Weekly chart performance for Look at Me: The Album
Chart (2022)	Peak position
Australian Albums (ARIA)	15
Belgian Albums (Ultratop Flanders)	69
Belgian Albums (Ultratop Wallonia)	157
Canadian Albums (Billboard)	11
French Albums (SNEP)	60
Irish Albums (Official Charts)	26
Lithuanian Albums (AGATA)	67
New Zealand Albums (RMNZ)	7
Norwegian Albums (VG-lista)	19
UK Albums (Official Charts)	23
US Billboard 200	17
US Top R&B/Hip-Hop Albums (Billboard)	11
US Top Soundtracks (Billboard)	1

=== Year-end charts ===
2022 year-end chart performance for Look at Me: The Album
Chart (2022)	Position
Australian Albums (ARIA)	64
New Zealand Albums (RMNZ)	36
US Top Soundtracks (Billboard)	19

2023 year-end chart performance for Look at Me: The Album
Chart (2023)	Position
Australian Albums (ARIA)	44
French Albums (SNEP)	148
New Zealand Albums (RMNZ)	28
UK Albums (OCC)	69
US Top Soundtracks (Billboard)	20

2024 year-end chart performance for Look at Me: The Album
Chart (2024)	Position
Australian Albums (ARIA)	42
Australian Hip Hop/R&B Albums (ARIA)	8
French Albums (SNEP)	144
UK Albums (OCC)	68

== Certifications ==
Certifications for Look at Me: The Album
Region	Certification	Certified units/sales
France (SNEP)	Platinum	100,000^{‡}
New Zealand (RMNZ)	2× Platinum	30,000^{‡}
United Kingdom (BPI)	Platinum	300,000^{‡}
^{‡} Sales+streaming figures based on certification alone.
