= XXXTentacion murder trial =

2023 murder trial in Florida

Florida v. Boatwright, Newsome, and Williams
- Case Number 18008318CF10A (Boatwright), 18008640CF10A (Newsome), 18007440CF10A (Williams)
- Court: 17th Judicial Circuit in and for Broward County, Florida
- Full case name: The State of Florida v. Michael Boatwright, Trayvon Newsome, and Dedrick D. Williams
- Submitted: June 20, 2018
- Started: February 7, 2023
- Decided: March 20, 2023; 3 years ago
- Verdict: Guilty on all counts
- Charge: First-degree murder of Jahseh Onfroy, a human being; Robbery with a firearm
- Prosecution: Pascale Achille
- Defense: Boatwright: Joseph Kimok; Newsome: George Reres; Williams: Mauricio Padilla

Case history
- Subsequent actions: Boatwright sentenced to two consecutive life sentences without the possibility of parole, plus an additional 30 years in prison; Newsome and Williams sentenced to life in prison without the possibility of parole

Court membership
- Judge sitting: Michael A. Usan

Case opinions
- Decision by: Jury verdict

The State of Florida v. Michael Boatwright, Trayvon Newsome, and Dedrick Williams was an American criminal case in Florida's 17th Judicial Circuit in which the three were charged with robbing and murdering rapper and singer-songwriter Jahseh Onfroy, better known as XXXTentacion. They were convicted on all charges and were given the mandatory sentence of life in prison without the possibility of parole.

On June 18, 2018, after leaving RIVA motorsports in Deerfield Beach, Florida in his car, Onfroy was stopped by two masked men who robbed him at gun point. He was then shot three times and died from his wounds. Michael Boatwright and Trayvon Newsome were the gunmen, Boatwright was the shooter, and Dedrick Williams was the main orchestrator. The trial began on February 7, 2023. Both the prosecution and defense rested their cases on March 3, 2023. Closing arguments occurred on March 7 and 8, and on March 20, the jury found all defendants guilty. On April 6, 2023, Newsome and Williams were given the mandatory sentence of life in prison without the possibility of parole, while Boatwright received two consecutive life sentences without parole, plus another 30 years.

== Background ==
=== Arrests and charges ===
Two days after the murder of Jahseh Onfroy, a.k.a. XXXTentacion, 22-year-old Dedrick Devonshay Williams was arrested on June 20, 2018, in connection with the killing. He was charged with dangerous and depraved first-degree murder, robbery with a firearm, and operating a vehicle without a valid driver's license. Three arrests followed in the coming months; 22-year-old Robert Allen, 22-year old Michael Boatwright, and 20-year old Trayvon Newsome were arrested and charged with premeditated first-degree murder and robbery with a firearm. All were later indicted by a grand jury on premeditated murder.

Grand jury indictment of the defendants

=== Robert Allen's guilty plea ===
On August 12, 2022, defendant Robert Allen, who had been charged with premeditated first-degree murder and robbery with a firearm, pleaded guilty to the latter and the lesser conviction of second-degree murder as a plea deal to testify against Boatwright, Newsome, and Williams at trial. In May 2023, Allen was sentenced to 7 years in prison. He was released from prison on October 26, 2023 and is currently on probation.

== Trial ==
The trial of Michael Boatwright, Trayvon Newsome, and Dedrick Williams began on February 7, 2023, after ten days of jury selection, nearly five years after the death of Jahseh Onfroy.

=== Opening statements ===
==== Prosecution ====
Lead prosecutor Pascale Achille gave the opening statement for the state. She gave an overview of the state's case, that the three defendants, along with Allen, tracked and targeted Onfroy and that surveillance video, among other evidence, will prove it. She said that the defendants trapped Onfroy in his black BMW i8 with their rented Dodge Journey, and stole Onfroy's Louis Vuitton bag containing $50,000 in cash. She stated that Boatwright then murdered Onfroy without provocation, and that the defendants later boasted on social media about the cash which they robbed from Onfroy.

==== Defense ====
Michael Boatwright's attorney, Joseph Kimok, stated in his opening statement that Michael Boatwright was innocent and had been falsely accused of murdering Onfroy. He alleged that Broward County authorities rushed the investigation, and that Boatwright took some "very stupid" photos with the stolen money, but that he was not the murderer. He claimed that the fact that Boatwright searched "accessory to murder" proves that he is innocent. Newsome's attorney, George Reres, similarly claimed that his client was not there, and Williams's attorney, Mauricio Padilla, alleged that authorities did not investigate the possibility that rapper Drake, whom Onfroy had feuded with, was involved, and similarly to Kimok, accused authorities of rushing the investigation.

=== Testimonies ===
==== Leonard Kerr ====
Onfroy's step-uncle, Leonard Kerr, was with Onfroy in his vehicle when he was confronted by the suspects. He testified the first day of the trial. He testified that he believed the only way he could live was if he ran out of the car, which he did.

==== Robert Allen ====
February 8, 2023, second day of the trial, featured further testimony from Kerr and further display of surveillance footage. The most prominent portion was accomplice Robert Allen's testimony against the other three defendants.

Robert Allen, who had pleaded guilty to the second-degree murder of Onfroy (with the premeditated first-degree murder charge dropped) and armed robbery in exchange for testimony against the other three defendants, testified against the three on day two of the trial on February 8, 2023.

Allen stated that he had been closest with Dedrick Williams out of the three defendants, and had been friends with him for about five years and hung out almost every day. Allen stated that Trayvon Newsome had been living with him for about two or three weeks at the time of the murder. He stated that he had known Michael Boatwright for about two years at the time of the murder. He said that he also had seen Boatwright almost every day.

Allen corroborated the prosecution's account of the murder. He elaborated about the planning of the killing, describing how Williams was the main planner. He stated under oath that he, Boatwright, Newsome, and Williams tracked Onfroy once they spotted him. Williams noticed Onfroy's car and intentionally drove into RIVA Motorsports, and saw Onfroy get out of his car and walk into the store. Boatwright and Newsome then told Allen and Williams that they should go into RIVA Motorsports to confirm that it was actually Onfroy. They then bought masks in the store for the robbery/murder. He and Williams then came back to the car and informed Boatwright and Newsome that it was Onfroy in the store. Allen stated that he initially told the others that the robbery was not a good idea because he and Williams had already been on surveillance at RIVA Motorsports. He said that Boatwright and Newsome then became reluctant to go forward with the crime. Williams asked the two if they were scared, and Boatwright replied, "Alright, we're gonna get him." Allen stated that Boatwright and Newsome were chosen to be the gunmen due to the fact that he and Williams were already on surveillance footage. The four parked lying in wait for Onfroy for about 10 minutes, and the robbery ensued followed by Boatwright murdering Onfroy by shooting him.

Allen confirmed the prosecution's account that it was the plan to rob and murder Onfroy once they had trapped him with the Dodge Journey, and that Boatwright and Newsome stole Onfroy's gold chain and Louis Vuitton bag containing $50,000. He stated that originally, since Allen perceivably had the smallest role in the robbery and murder, that Newsome and Williams said that Allen should not have gotten any of the stolen money, but Boatwright insisted that Allen get some of the money since he was there with them. They agreed that of the $50,000, Boatwright, Newsome, and Williams would get $15,000 each and Allen would get $5,000. He also contradicted Boatwright's attorney's defense; Boatwright's attorney claimed in his opening statement that the fact that Boatwright had searched "accessory to murder" proved that Boatwright did not commit the murder, and was just associated with the men afterwards. Allen stated that the actual reason was because Allen said he was afraid he would be arrested for murder following the killing, and Boatwright misinformed him that at most Allen could be charged with accessory after-the-fact to murder, and searched for it during his conversation with Allen to show him the legal definition.

Allen, Boatwright, and Newsome learned of Onfroy's confirmed death while they were in the car, attempting to go to a car wash. Allen stated that he and Newsome were silent and that Boatwright turned the music up afterwards. Boatwright soon accidentally crashed the Dodge Journey, and they ran away from the scene. All four later met up at Boatwright's house, with Boatwright telling Allen he needed to go back to the scene to get the car. Allen refused, saying that he wanted nothing to do with the murder vehicle. Newsome eventually complied with Boatwright and went back to the scene and retrieved the car. Williams learned of Onfroy's confirmed death while at Boatwright's and said to Allen, "Damn, he's really dead," while Allen remained silent.

February 10, 2023, the fourth day of the trial, mainly consisted of cross-examination of Allen by defense attorneys. Boatwright's attorney additionally attempted to impeach Allen as a state witness, but was denied by the trial judge.

When Allen was asked by Williams's attorney if he was testifying against the other three defendants to "save [his] own skin" to get a lighter sentence or if he genuinely had remorse, Allen responded, "Well, I definitely would like to get a lighter sentence, yes, but I definitely have remorse ... I mean, I sit and look at the stand and see people crying, and I'm trying to do my best to get [Onfroy's] family and friends and his fans justice." He stated that his time in jail has given him much time to reflect on the situation.

==== Scott Barbieux ====
On February 14, 2023, Scott Barbieux, a fan of XXXTentacion who witnessed the murder, gave testimony describing his perspective of the robbery and murder. He corroborated the prosecution's order of events. Barbieux's testimony gained attention on social media due to the perceived strange mannerisms he displayed, commonly interrupting the attorneys. Barbieux's testimony was notable because he took a picture of Onfroy's dead body after the murder, and when asked why he did so by the prosecution, stated, "Because I was a big fan of his and I wanted to have a photo to remember that forever," which came off as bizarre to XXXTentacion fans on social media.

==== Tenell Carter ====
On February 15, 2023, Dedrick Williams's former girlfriend, Tenell Carter testified against Williams for the prosecution. She testified that Williams confessed to her that he orchestrated the robbery and murder of Onfroy, and that he had attempted to have her write an affidavit lying that he was not the driver of the murder vehicle. Countering the defense's narrative, Carter stated that Williams never said anything about Drake or the rapper group Migos being involved in the murder, a conspiracy theory proposed by Williams's defense attorney.

==== John Curcio ====
The lead detective in the murder investigation, John Curcio testified for the prosecution on February 23, 2023. He led the jury through the stages in the investigation. He stated, "The two different timelines mirrored each other. When the phone arrived, the car, the journey is seen, when the phone leaves Riva, the journey is leaving Riva." He denied conspiracy theories brought up by the defense regarding any involvement of Drake.

==== Nicole Ihnat ====
Nicole Ihnat, a forensic DNA analyst from the Broward County crime laboratory testified for the prosecution on February 28, 2023. She stated that forensic DNA evidence, including DNA on the masks used during the murder, were consistent with the defendants'. She stated that the DNA linked to the suspects was extremely rare. Specifically, that Dedrick Williams' was rarer than 1 in 831 octillion, and DNA linked to Michael Boatwright was rarer than 1 in 929 nonillion.

=== Witness intimidation allegations against Trayvon Newsome ===
During the third day of the trial, Allen and a prison officer alleged witness intimidation against Trayvon Newsome. Allen and the prison officer stated that earlier that day while Allen and the other co-defendants were in their holding cells, Newsome yelled at Allen that he was a "police ass nigga", "work[s] for the police", that he is "working for the white man", and is "a sell out". The prosecution stated that this was a clear attempt to influence Allen's testimony.

=== Involvement of conspiracy theories regarding Drake ===
February 9, 2023, the third day of the trial, mainly featured Robert Allen confirming and corroborating information and details about the murder that the prosecution had present. Rapper Drake was also ordered to testify on February 27, and could be charged with contempt of court if he did not appear.

On February 13, 2023, Drake's lawyer Bradford Cohen appeared in court requesting for the cancellation of the requested deposition.

February 14, 2023, the sixth day of the trial, included testimony from Robert Allen regarding conspiracy theories brought up by defense attorneys that rapper Drake had ordered the murder of Jahseh Onfroy. Allen stated that Drake had not hired them to commit the murder, and that himself and the other three defendants were the only four involved in planning the murder. Following, trial judge Usan accepted Drake's lawyer's request, and Drake was no longer required to appear for the deposition.

=== Closing arguments ===
==== Prosecution ====
Lead prosecutor Pascale Achille used her closing argument to overview the main evidence against the three defendants. Among the evidence overviewed were:

- DNA evidence against the defendants
- Newsome's confession to burying the stolen money on text messages
- Williams having a .22 caliber bullet in his home
- Boatwright's phone's Bluetooth being connected to the murder vehicle
- Boatwright and Williams's phone location being tracked to the location of the murder
- A box of bullets at Boatwright's home only having four bullets missing, which was the number of times Onfroy was shot at by Boatwright

In order to prove the premeditation element of the first-degree murder charges that the defendants faced, Achille sat in silence for eight minutes and 35 seconds, the amount of time the defendants waited in the vehicle for Onfroy, in order to give the jury a concept of the time in which they had to think about carrying out the murder. She branded the defendants as "predators" who were guilty of first-degree murder and armed robbery.

==== Defense ====
In his closing argument, George Reres, Newsome's lawyer, said that the witness intimidation allegations do not prove Newsome's guilt, and contended that Newsome was not "bragging" when he was in videos with his co-defendants flashing Onfroy's stolen money, and that it was instead "something done by young people these days".

Williams's lawyer, Mauricio Padilla, used his closing statement to attempt to discredit the prosecution's witnesses, seldom focusing on trial evidence presented by the prosecution. Padilla began by claiming that he believed eyewitness Scott Barbieux was not sober during his testimony, and therefore was not reliable. Padilla tried to discredit Onfroy's step-uncle Leonard Kerr, by saying Kerr could not have been a driver for Uber and Lyft, which he had said his occupation was, because he had an expensive house, and his attire was described by Padilla as "Gucci down to the socks". He also expressed disbelief that Kerr or his family could have afforded "two humongous bodyguards" which Padilla claimed Kerr came into court with. He also justified himself calling key witness Robert Allen "fat" during his cross-examination of him, claiming that his obesity was relevant to the case, and that Allen could not be believed since he has tattoos. He also brought up debunked conspiracy theories regarding the involvement of rapper Drake and rap group Migos.

Boatwright's lawyer, Joseph Kimok, used his closing statement to again accuse authorities of rushing the investigation, and said that Robert Allen was not credible. He also stated that evidence found against Boatwright was found weeks after the murder and therefore was unreliable.

==== Prosecution rebuttal ====
In her rebuttal to the defenses' closing arguments, Achille said in response to defense attorneys saying Allen was not credible since he was an admitted criminal, "Plans hatched in hell don't have angels for witnesses." She responded to Williams's lawyer saying Allen could not be trusted because he has tattoos by bringing up that Williams himself has numerous tattoos. She also responded to Boatwright's lawyer by saying that the reason so much evidence was found weeks after the murder was because Boatwright attempted to flee to Georgia.

=== Verdict ===
On March 20, 2023, nearly two weeks after jury deliberations began, all three defendants were found guilty on all counts. Deliberations were much longer than most expected, and the unexpected length of the deliberations led to initial speculation that there may have been a hung jury. Michael Boatwright made headlines for the fact that he blew a kiss to Onfroy's family as the guilty verdicts were read, with many online expressing their contempt for Boatwright's conduct.

== Sentencing ==
=== Boatwright, Newsome, and Williams ===
Sentencing for the three defendants commenced on April 6, 2023. Onfroy's manager, Solomon Sobande gave a victim impact statement on behalf of himself and Onfroy's family, in which he stated to the murderers, "We sat through this entire trial without seeing the defendants display an ounce of remorse for taking Jahseh's life. Smiling at us, blowing kisses, waving, without even taking into consideration you not only killed a son, but you killed a father." Onfroy's great-aunt also gave a victim impact statement on behalf of herself and Onfroy's grandmother, who had a stroke and could not make it to the sentencing. She stated to Onfroy's murderers, "I heard the death penalty is off the table, however, whatever time is given and whichever hole you are sent, I hope it is hell and you rot there."

Presiding judge Michael A. Usan spoke directly to Onfroy's family and fans before he sentenced the defendants, in which he said:

From this day forward, you can stop thinking about Michael Boatwright, Trayvon Newsome, Dedrick Williams, Robert Allen. They're no longer part of [Onfroy's] story. From this day forward, you reflect on all the good that he brought this world. And the joy that he brought to as many fans and followers throughout the world ... His memory should not be that moment that we're here for today ... His life was greater than that. And for you, at least, you can go forward knowing that he has left a legacy. And that he lives on through the music that he left and the love that's felt in the hearts of all those who followed him and adored him, and that can't die. That never dies. That goes on forever. So please take some solace from that and know that he has left a mark on this earth that cannot be stolen or murdered, because it will continue forever.

— Judge Michael A. Usan

Trayvon Newsome and Dedrick Williams were sentenced by trial judge Michael A. Usan to life imprisonment without the possibility of parole. Michael Boatwright was sentenced to two consecutive life sentences without the possibility of parole, one for first-degree murder and one for armed robbery, and another consecutive 30 years in prison for other charges. Usan expressed his condemnation of Boatwright to him before sentencing him, stating:

You turned a robbery into a murder. And on that day when you stood there and fired that weapon, you didn't just end one life. You effectively ended five lives, including your own ... You will spend the rest of your life in prison. From here you will go and be placed in a cell that has a stainless steel slab attached to the wall. That's your bed. And next to it is a stainless steel sink and a stainless steel toilet. That's the furniture that you have in that cell. You'll spend every hour, and every day, and every week, and every year of your life in that cell. And one day, they'll come and open up that cell in the morning and you'll have passed on. And only on that day will you have served your sentence.

— Judge Michael A. Usan

Boatwright unlawfully accessed Instagram while in prison in October 2024, and posted with regard to the murder, "I'm not sorry for nothing I did."

=== Allen ===
On May 17, 2023, trial judge Usan sentenced Robert Allen, the final defendant, to 7 years in prison, with credit for 4 years, 9 months, and 21 days served, followed by 20 years probation. Usan said that he believed Allen was, unlike the other three defendants, genuinely remorseful for the murder, and Onfroy's family said they were satisfied with Allen's sentence. Allen's lenient sentence was also due to him providing information to authorities which gave them probable cause for an arrest in an unrelated cold case murder connected to the ZMF gang, which Allen, Boatwright, and Williams were said to be affiliated with. Before his sentencing, he addressed judge Usan and Onfroy's family. He stated to the court,

To say I’m sorry does not even begin the true inner remorse I want to make known. I know that these words that I will speak will never erase the pain and sorrow and loss of what the family will have from now on. There isn’t a day that goes by that I don’t think about what happened and beg for forgiveness from God. If I have to die in prison then so be it, I know the risk I was taking. Let justice be served and I’ll know that was the right thing to do ... Please forgive me.

— Robert Allen
