= King of the Dead =

King of the Dead may refer to:

- King of the Dead (album), the second album by the American heavy metal band Cirith Ungol
- King of the Dead (novel), a novel set in the Ravenloft campaign setting for Dungeons & Dragons
- King of the Dead, a character in the film The Lord of the Rings: The Return of the King
- King of the Dead (song), a song by XXXTentacion
