= I Don't Wanna Do This Anymore =

2016 song by XXXTentacion

Song by XXXTentacion

from the album Revenge
- Released: April 14, 2016 (SoundCloud); May 16, 2017 (Empire re-release)
- Recorded: 2016
- Genre: Alternative R&B; emo rap; cloud rap
- Length: 1:27
- Label: Bad Vibes Forever; Empire
- Songwriters: Jahseh Onfroy; Jeryn Peters
- Producer: Khaed

"I Don't Wanna Do This Anymore" is a song by American rapper and singer XXXTentacion. It was originally released independently on SoundCloud as a standalone track on April 14, 2016, and later re-released commercially on his debut commercial mixtape, Revenge, which came out on May 16, 2017, through Empire Distribution. The song is also included on XXXTentacion’s only compilation album, Look at Me: The Album, where it appears as the thirteenth song on the project.

The track was produced by Khaed and samples the 2015 song "Whitley" by American singer and producer Nova. The song was described by XXL as one of X's "best deep cuts".

== Background ==
"I Don't Wanna Do This Anymore" was among XXXTentacion's early releases on SoundCloud and became one of his most notable tracks prior to his mainstream breakthrough. In his 2017 XXL Freshman profile interview, he described the song as one of his biggest at the time. The track also drew the attention of New York–based manager Solomon Sobande, who told Billboard that while "Look at Me!" was beginning to gain momentum online, it was this song that ultimately persuaded him to contact and later manage the artist, helping him secure a distribution deal with Empire. The producer of the song, Khaed, passed away in 2019.

== Personnel ==
Credits adapted from Apple Music.

- Jahseh Onfroy - performer, songwriter, composer
- Jeryn Peters - songwriter, composer
- Khaed Moulton - producer, recording engineer

== Certifications ==
Region	Certification	Certified units/sales
New Zealand (RMNZ)	2× Platinum	60,000^{‡}
United Kingdom (BPI)	Gold	400,000^{‡}
United States (RIAA)	2× Platinum	2,000,000^{‡}
^{‡} Sales+streaming figures based on certification alone.
