= Craig Xen =

American rapper (born 1994)

- Born: Craig J. Gordwin; October 24, 1994 (age 31); Houston, Texas U.S.
- Genres: Hip hop; lo-fi; trap metal; SoundCloud rap
- Occupations: Rapper; songwriter
- Years active: 2013–2020; 2024–present
- Labels: Empire, Bad Vibes Forever, Cruel World
- Formerly of: Members Only • Schemaposse
- Website: craigxen.com

Craig J. Gordwin (born October 24, 1994), known professionally as Craig Xen, is an American rapper. He is best known for his collaborations with XXXTentacion and hip hop collective Members Only. He retired from the music industry in 2020. He returned in 2024 with the release of the singles "lost without u" and "Back For You".

== Early life ==
Gordwin was born on October 24, 1994, in Houston, Texas. He was raised Catholic and frequented a Catholic school until 6th grade. In an interview with Adam22 in February 2016, he stated that he was raised by his mother while his father spent time in jail and that he started rapping when he was 6 years old with his cousin. He grew up listening to Screwed Up Click, Green Day, Linkin Park, Eminem and Lil B, with Lil B being one of his biggest musical inspirations. He has stated that the last name in his stage name, Xen (formerly Zen) came from when he was in high school and was interested by spirituality, used hallucinogens and practiced meditation.

== Career ==
Due to not being able to find employment and not wanting to be a drug dealer, Craig Xen released his first song, "H.D.A.B.", in April 2013 on SoundCloud featuring his cousin Kay Rillo. Xen then moved to Los Angeles, California to further his career. In 2015, before joining Members Only, he was a member of the Schemaposse collective, which included rappers JGRXXN, Lil Peep and Ghostemane, before being kicked out of the group until their dissolution due to personal conflicts regarding the group's heavy drug use and others in the group encouraging Lil Peep's continued addictions. In February 2016, he released the song "Good Fellas" featuring Pouya and Shakewell.

In 2016, Xen joined the hip hop collective Members Only, which was originally a duo between XXXTentacion and Ski Mask the Slump God. Xen appeared on 4 songs from the mixtape Members Only, Vol. 3, released on June 26, 2017. He was also a part of XXXTentacion's The Revenge Tour. The hip hop collective's debut album, Members Only, Vol. 4, was released on January 23, 2019, by Empire. The project debuted at number 18 on the US Billboard 200 with Xen appearing on 8 songs. Xen announced his departure from the group after the album's release.

During the year 2016, Xen released the songs "Death to He Who Cross Me", "Six Men, One Casket" and "Blueberry Lemonade" featuring Lil Peep and Nedarb. Xen was also featured on XXXTentacion's single "I Wonder If Bloods Watch Blues Clues". Another collaborative single, "Crucify Thy Infant, Son of Whore" with XXXTentacion and Garette Revenge was released in May 2017. His first studio album, Voltage, was released by label Cruel World in October 2017. His second studio album, Hell Bent, was released in May 2018 by Empire with singles like "Killa" featuring Yung Bans or "Murder" featuring Wifisfuneral.

Craig Xen was featured alongside Lil Skies on Gnar's song "Death Note". The music video for the song was directed by Cole Bennett and was published on the Lyrical Lemonade YouTube channel on June 4, 2019. Craig Xen's first extended play, Broken Kids Club, was released in June 2019 by Cruel World and Empire. The project is supported by songs "Run it Back!" with XXXTentacion and "Stain" featuring Ski Mask the Slump God and Smokepurpp. A music video for the project's song "Cry Baby, Cell 17", directed by JMP, was published on July 17, 2019 and another music video for the song "Run it Back!", also directed by JMP, was released on July 30, 2019. was released. Craig Xen was featured on the song "The Only Time I Feel Alive" from XXXTentacion's posthumous album Bad Vibes Forever, which was released in December 2019. After being featured on the album, he subsequently retired from music but returned in 2024, releasing the singles "lost without u" and "Back For You".

== Discography ==
=== Studio albums ===
- Why (2020)

=== Collaborative albums ===
- Members Only, Vol. 4 (2019) (as part of Members Only)

=== Mixtapes ===
- Infinite ☥ Militia (2015) (with Kay Rillo)
- CHAPTER ONE – ENTER REALM (2015) (with GG Neeks)
- CHAPTER TWO – THE ORACLE (2015) (with GG Neeks)
- Decay (2015)
- Brute (2015)
- Xen (2015)
- DARKWATER (2015)
- 5 ★ THREAT (2015)
- Resilient (2016)
- Waist Deep (2016)
- Revelation (2016)
- Martyr (2016)
- Members Only, Vol. 3 (2017) (as part of Members Only)
- Voltage (2017)
- Hell Bent (2018)
- PROTECT ME FROM MYSELF (2019)

=== Extended plays ===
- Broken Kids Club (2019)
- God is Watching (2020)

=== Singles ===
- Bare Flesh (2016)
- Voltage (2016)
- Succubus (2016)
- Chopstix (2018)
- Stain (2018)
- Run It Back! (2019) (with XXXTentacion)
- Fall In Love (2019) (with Diablo)
- Lost without u (2024)
- Back For You (2024)
