= Sauce! (XXXTentacion song) =

2019 song by XXXTentacion

Song by XXXTentacion

from the album Members Only, Vol. 4
- Released: January 23, 2019
- Recorded: 2018
- Genre: SoundCloud rap; Hip-hop
- Length: 2:24
- Label: Members only; Empire
- Songwriters: Jahseh Onfroy; Donovan White
- Producer: Bass Santana

"Sauce!" is a song by American rapper and singer XXXTentacion from American hip hop collective Members Only debut studio album, Members Only, Vol. 4, released on what would have been XXXTentacion's 21st birthday, January 23, 2019, via Empire Distribution.

The song was produced by Bass Santana.

== Background ==
“Sauce!” is based on the vocals from “$aUcE!,” a remix recorded by XXXTentacion that was originally performed over the instrumental of “Ice Tray” by Quality Control, Quavo and Lil Yachty, released exclusively on SoundCloud on February 4, 2018. For “Sauce!,” the vocals were reused and put over a new instrumental produced by Bass Santana.

The animated music video was directed by Tristan Zammit.

== Personnel ==
Credits adapted from Apple Music.

- Jahseh Onfroy - vocals, songwriter
- Donovan White - songwriter, producer

== Charts ==
Chart (2018)	Peak position
Canada Hot 100 (Billboard)	71
New Zealand Hot Singles (RMNZ)	12
US Billboard Hot 100	89
US Hot R&B/Hip-Hop Songs (Billboard)	41

== Certifications ==
Certifications for "Sauce!"
Region	Certification	Certified units/sales
United States (RIAA)	Gold	500,000^{‡}
^{‡} Sales+streaming figures based on certification alone.
