= Members Only, Vol. 4 =

2019 studio album by American hip hop collective Members Only

XXXTentacion Presents: Members Only, Vol. 4

Studio album by Members Only
- Released: January 23, 2019
- Genres: Hip-hop; emo rap; trap
- Length: 64:44
- Label: Empire
- Producers: 4AM; Astroboy; Bass Santana; ChaseTheMoney; Cris Dinero; DavyDaDon; Flyboy Tarantino; Killstation; Lvstname; Mike Gonsolin; Mikey the Magician; Natra Average; Richie Souf; Vngry; Win8k; Muro; XXXTentacion

Members Only chronology
Members Only, Vol. 3 (2017)	XXXTentacion Presents: Members Only, Vol. 4 (2019)

XXXTentacion chronology
Skins (2018)	Members Only, Vol. 4 (2019)	Bad Vibes Forever (2019)

Members Only, Vol. 4, also referred to by its full title XXXTentacion Presents: Members Only, Vol. 4 on streaming services, is the debut album by American hip hop collective Members Only, led and presented posthumously by XXXTentacion. It follows the Members Only Vol.1! EP, and 2 mixtapes, Vol. 2 and Vol. 3. It was released on what would have been XXXTentacion's 21st birthday, January 23, 2019, via Empire Distribution. The album is the only Members Only project to be released since XXXTentacion's murder.

In the United States, Members Only, Vol. 4 debuted at number 23 on the US Billboard 200 chart, earning 16,000 album-equivalent units, with 2,000 coming from pure album sales in its first week. The album peaked at 18 on the US Billboard 200 chart.

== Background ==
The Members Only collective first hinted at the upcoming release of Members Only, Vol. 4 through social media posts in mid-2018, with Craig Xen confirming the project's development on X (then Twitter) in late June, building anticipation among fans following XXXTentacion's death in June 2018. On January 9, 2019, the group officially announced the album's release date via a teaser video posted to XXXTentacion's Instagram account, featuring a stylized "MO" logo over a black screen accompanied by audio snippets of XXXTentacion's vocals from the intro track,, "XXX (Prelude)", from Members Only Vol. 2, explicitly tying the drop to what would have been his 21st birthday on January 23. This announcement highlighted the project's role as a posthumous tribute, with Members Only members like Ski Mask the Slump God and Craig Xen sharing additional Instagram previews of tracks, including Ski Mask's snippet of a song dedicated to XXXTentacion, to honor his influence on the collective.

== Promotion and release ==
The album was released on January 23, 2019, what would have been XXXTentacion's 21st birthday. On the day of the album's release, Members Only embarked on a 22-date tour from January to March 2019, co-headed by Kid Trunks and Craig Xen and featuring other members Cooliecut, Tankhead666, Ratchet Roach, Bass Santana, Flyboy Tarantino, Rawhool, SB, ReddzMoney, and DJ Slicid.

On February 15, an animated music video for "Sauce!", performed by XXXTentacion, was released. The video was animated and directed by Tristan Zammit. The song was certified gold by the Recording Industry Association of America (RIAA) for the United States on June 28, 2019.

== Commercial performance ==
In the United States, Members Only, Vol. 4 debuted at number 23 on the US Billboard 200 chart, earning 16,000 album-equivalent units, with 2,000 coming from pure album sales in its first week. The album peaked at 18 on the US Billboard 200 chart.

== Track listing ==
No.	Title	Producer(s) and Engineer(s)	Length
1.	"Corey's Intro" (performed by Corey)	XXXTentacion; Denzel "Heartbreak" Richards	1:52
2.	"Nothing" (performed by Cooliecut, Craig Xen, and Killstation)	Mikey the Magician	2:08
3.	"Sauce!" (performed by XXXTentacion)	Bass Santana; Denzel "Heartbreak" Richards	2:24
4.	"Gassed Up!" (performed by XXXTentacion, Flyboy Tarantino, Kid Trunks, Bass Santana, and Kin$oul)	Bass Santana; Denzel "Heartbreak" Richards	3:45
5.	"Plottin" (performed by Kid Trunks, Flyboy Tarantino, and Robb Banks)	Richie Souf; Denzel "Heartbreak" Richards	2:57
6.	"Pick Your Poison" (performed by Tankhead and Ikabod Veins)	Bass Santana	1:45
7.	"Fall in Love with Death" (performed by Bass Santana, Cooliecut, and Kin$oul)	ChaseTheMoney	2:42
8.	"Love Hard, Fall Fast" (performed by Flyboy Tarantino and Craig Xen)	Lvstname	3:02
9.	"Now or Never" (performed by Flyboy Tarantino, Craig Xen, and Kidway)	Flyboy Tarantino	2:41
10.	"Cold Weather" (performed by Killstation, Cooliecut, and Craig Xen)	Killstation	2:03
11.	"Touch Eem Body" (performed by XXXTentacion, Bass Santana, Kin$oul, and Reddz)	Bass Santana; Denzel "Heartbreak" Richards	3:07
12.	"Jahseh on My Wrist" (performed by Bass Santana, Flyboy Tarantino, Kid Trunks, and Craig Xen)	ChaseTheMoney; Courtney "AyooiNk" Jenkins; Denzel "Heartbreak" Richards	3:37
13.	"He Diddy!" (performed by Ski Mask the Slump God)	Win8k; 4AM	1:14
14.	"You Are Not M.O." (performed by Bass Santana, Kin$oul, Robb Banks, Bhris, and Absentwill)	ChaseTheMoney	2:24
15.	"Make Eem Run!" (performed by Bass Santana, XXXTentacion, and Ski Mask the Slump God)	Bass Santana; Denzel "Heartbreak" Richards	3:12
16.	"Proud Puppy Lover!" (performed by Craig Xen)	Astroboy; Mike Gonsolin	1:57
17.	"Woah (Freestyle)" (performed by Kid Trunks)	Cris Dinero; Denzel "Heartbreak" Richards	3:04
18.	"Members Only!" (performed by Tankhead, Ratchet Roach, Flyboy Tarantino, Cooliecut, Kid Trunks, Craig Xen, SB, Kin$oul, Rawhool Mane and Bass Santana)	G Foster	3:49
19.	"Radar" (performed by Ratchet Roach, Bass Santana, and Robb Banks)	DavyDaDon	2:24
20.	"Hi Wendy!" (performed by XXXTentacion, Bass Santana, Kin$oul, Kid Trunks, and Flyboy Tarantino)	Bass Santana; Denzel "Heartbreak" Richards	3:08
21.	"Over the Rainbow" (performed by Cooliecut, Kin$oul, and Rawhool Mane)	Vngry; Denzel "Heartbreak" Richards	2:46
22.	"Red Pills (Love in the Matrix)" (performed by Cooliecut and Kin$oul)	Vngry	2:23
23.	"Empty" (performed by Cooliecut, Craig Xen, Kin$oul, and Ski Mask the Slump God)	Natra Average	3:46
24.	"Rebirth (2016)" (performed by XXXTentacion and Killstation)	XXXTentacion; Killstation	2:34
Total length:			64:44

=== Notes ===
- "Corey's Intro" by Corey contains samples of "XXX (Prelude)", the intro track for Members Only Vol. 2, as performed by XXXTentacion.
- "Sauce!" by XXXTentacion is a remix of his 2018 remix of "Ice Tray" by Quality Control, Quavo and Lil Yachty, which shares the same name as this remix but is stylized as "$aUcE!".
- "Touch Eem Body" contains samples of "Ocean Eyes", written by Finneas O'Connell, as performed by Billie Eilish.
- "Over the Rainbow" contains samples of "I've Been Over the Rainbow", as performed by Mort Garson.
- "Empty" contains samples of "Hexagram", as performed by Orlogin.
- "Rebirth (2016)" samples a 2016 Periscope livestream by XXXTentacion.

== Charts ==
Chart (2019)	Peak position
Belgian Albums (Ultratop Flanders)	49
Belgian Albums (Ultratop Wallonia)	149
Canadian Albums (Billboard)	15
Danish Albums (Hitlisten)	25
Dutch Albums (Album Top 100)	39
Estonian Albums (IFPI)	32
Finnish Albums (Suomen virallinen lista)	48
French Albums (SNEP)	100
Lithuanian Albums (AGATA)	34
New Zealand Albums (RMNZ)	29
Norwegian Albums (VG-lista)	32
Swiss Albums (Schweizer Hitparade)	71
US Billboard 200	18
US Top R&B/Hip-Hop Albums (Billboard)	11
