= True Love (Kanye West and XXXTentacion song) =

2022 single by Kanye West and XXXTentacion

Single by Kanye West and XXXTentacion

from the album Donda 2 and Look at Me: The Album
- Released: May 27, 2022
- Recorded: 2018–2022
- Genre: Progressive rap; conscious hip hop; emo rap
- Length: 2:28 (single version); 3:17 (Donda 2 version (Stem Player)); 2:17 (Donda 2 version)
- Label: Columbia
- Songwriters: Kanye West; Jahseh Onfroy; John Cunningham; Michael Dean; Mark Williams; Raul Cubina; John Roger Branch; Peter Phillips
- Producers: Kanye West; John Cunningham; Ojivolta; Mike Dean

XXXTentacion singles chronology
"Vice City" (2022)	"True Love" (2022)	"WitDemDicks" (2022)

Kanye West singles chronology
"Keep It Burnin" (2022)	"True Love" (2022)	"Daylight" (2022)

"True Love" is a song by American rappers Kanye West and XXXTentacion. The song, which is a posthumous release for the latter, was originally included on West's eleventh studio album, Donda 2 (2022). For its single version, it was trimmed down by a minute and released by Columbia Records on May 23, 2022 in promotion for XXXTentacion's posthumous compilation album, Look at Me: The Album—serving as its second single. A slow track that features synths, it finds West discussing his estrangement from his children, while XXXTentacion croons the hook. The song was written by its performers, while production was handled by West alongside Ojivolta, Mike Dean, and John Cunningham, each of whom are also credited as co-writers.

"True Love" received positive reviews from music critics, who were positive towards X's vocals. Some praised the musical style, though a few critics found the song underwhelming. It reached number 22 on the US Billboard Hot 100, while peaking at number 19 on the New Zealand Singles Chart. The song charted within the top 40 in eight other countries, including Australia and Canada. It was played in the documentary film Look at Me, which explores XXXTentacion's career and upbringing.

== Background ==
Kanye West commented on XXXTentacion's death in June 2018, tweeting: "rest in peace. I never told you how much you inspired me when you were here. thank you for existing." The two first collaborated on the song "One Minute" from XXXTentacion's third studio album Skins, released posthumously in 2018. That same year, West played portions of his then-upcoming album Yandhi, featuring vocals from the rapper. West's track "The Storm" that featured XXXTentacion leaked online, though the verse was never intended for the song. The song ultimately reworked into "Everything We Need" for his ninth studio album Jesus Is King (2019), omitting the feature. XXXTentacion appeared posthumously on "True Love" for Donda 2, as well as "Selfish".

In February 2022, "True Love" was first played at a listening event for the album in Miami. The song went through several tweaks before the record's release and afterwards, more edits were undertaken for the single version. Its album version runs for 2 minutes and 40 seconds, while the single edit has a length of 2 minutes and 28 seconds. On May 23, 2022, Columbia Records announced the song would be released as a single on May 27. One day before the release date, it premiered via iHeartRadio. After having appeared on Donda 2, the song was revealed to be set for release on Look at Me: The Album, and it is played over the closing credits of the Sabaah Folayan-directed documentary film of the same name that focuses on XXXTentacion's career. The cover art was designed by West and features handwritten notes that were scanned from XXXTentacion's journal, which his mother found. Handwritten notes include "Am I supposed to pretend to be heartless?", "Love love love", and "A feeling you just can't explain".

== Composition and lyrics ==
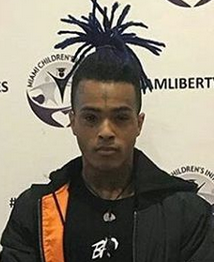
XXXTentacion begins the song crooning about lost love, which is repeated throughout the hook.

"True Love" was described by HotNewHipHop and the Financial Times as a slow track. The song begins as a light piano composition, before moving into a heavy drum beat. It features synths and a drum break that is identical to that of West's 2010 single "Runaway". XXXTentacion appears first, accompanied by melancholy minor chords. He croons the song's hook, which is followed by West rapping.

In the lyrics of "True Love", West raps about childcare arrangements between him and his wife Kim Kardashian under hostility after their divorce. He pleas for reconciliation by mentioning the children and makes accusations against Kardashian, including parental neglect, lying, and dressing their family incorrectly. West uses a line to reference XXXTentacion's son Gekyume Onfroy: "Daddy's not gone." XXXTentacion conveys sadness on the hook, singing of lost love.

== Release and reception ==
On February 24, 2022, "True Love" was included as the opening track on West's demo album Donda 2, which was released exclusively on his Stem Player website. The song was made available on various streaming services as the third single from the album by Columbia Records at 12 a.m. on May 27, one day after the Hulu premiere of Look at Me. "True Love" was later included as the 14th and last track on the 2nd disc of XXXTentacion's compilation album Look at Me: The Album on June 10, 2022. Jon Powell of Revolt named the song as a Donda 2 standout and "a powerful cut", attributing this to the emotional nature and how XXXTentacion's vocals "beautiful[ly] match" West's rapping about subjects such as his family and his failed marriage with Kardashian. HotNewHipHop's Alexander Cole declared that the "slow and melodic track" showcases West and XXXTentacion's "great chemistry", as well as demonstrating the late rapper "was a versatile artist who could take on a bevy of styles". Matthew Ritchie of HipHopDX highlighted the song's progression from "a delicate piano composition to a trudging drum beat" that would be appropriate on West's fifth studio album My Beautiful Dark Twisted Fantasy (2010), further noting how he airs out family frustrations. Ritchie elaborated that amongst "legitimate gripes" about relationship insecurities, West "sneaks in barbs about Kardashian's alleged parenting skills, getting uncomfortably personal". Exclaim! critic Riley Wallace said that West going after Kardashian and lamenting "the emotional, frustrating realities of co-parenting under hostility" is "a sharp juxtaposition" to the album's "much more menacing" track "Security", yet saw XXXTentacion's feature as filling in a glaring gap. Writing for The Daily Telegraph, Neil McCormick commented that West "kicks off about childcare arrangements", with the song including some of the "most sharply turned phrases" on Donda 2. He asserted that the song "swiftly degenerates into egotistic grumbles" about West's children wearing Nike shoes rather than his own brand's trainers, while XXXTentacion sings "weedily about lost love" over the chords.

In a mixed review, The Guardian journalist Alexis Petridis wrote that "True Love" "does everything it has to do" for the song's length: "mournful synth; mournful XXXTentacion sample; protracted whinge about Kardashian", though complained of too much synth at the halfway point. Petridis observed that West "sounds genuinely anguished" in his accusations against Kardashian, despite viewing the rapper "whining because he's spotted his children wearing a different make of trainer" as "pretty unedifying". Hunter-Tilney Ludovic was somewhat negative in the Financial Times, writing that West "raps woodenly[...], accompanied by a sad hook" from XXXTentacion. He also declared that the song has "a plangent atmosphere but dull dynamics" as it moves idley along like "splashing through puddles", while finding West's introspection to barely exceed the quality of a crying emoji. For Pitchfork, Alphonse Pierre felt that XXXTentacion's hook is "minor and unmemorable", seeing it as filler.

== Commercial performance ==
Following its release as a single, "True Love" debuted at number 22 on the US Billboard Hot 100, with 12.7 million streams. It generated 1.8 million in radio audience from airplay and sold 3,000 downloads, entering the US R&B/Hip-Hop Digital Song Sales chart at number six. The song debuted at number five on the US Hot R&B/Hip-Hop Songs chart, becoming West's 39th top 10 on the chart and XXXTentacion's fifth. It lasted for three weeks on the Hot 100. On the US Rhythmic chart, the song opened at number 34 and eventually peaked at number 10.

In Canada, the song entered the Canadian Hot 100 at number 21. It was most successful in New Zealand, peaking at number 19 on the New Zealand Singles Chart. Similarly, the song reached number 21 on Australia's ARIA Singles Chart. It peaked at numbers 25 and 26 on the Irish Singles Chart and Topp 40 Singles in Ireland and Norway, respectively, while also charting within the top 40 in Lithuania, the United Kingdom, Denmark, and Switzerland. On the overall Billboard Global 200, the song debuted at number 22.

== Personnel ==
Credits adapted from Tidal.

- Kanye West – performer, producer, songwriter
- XXXTentacion – performer, songwriter, recording engineer
- John Cunningham – producer, songwriter, recording engineer
- Mike Dean – producer, songwriter, mixing engineer, mastering engineer
- Mark Williams – producer, songwriter
- Raul Cubina – producer, songwriter
- John Roger Branch – songwriter
- Peter Phillips – songwriter
- Sean Solymar – assistant engineer
- Tommy Rush – assistant engineer

== Charts ==
=== Weekly charts ===
Weekly chart performance for "True Love"
Chart (2022)	Peak position
Australia (ARIA)	21
Austria (Ö3 Austria Top 40)	54
Canada Hot 100 (Billboard)	21
Denmark (Tracklisten)	32
Germany (GfK)	54
Global 200 (Billboard)	22
Ireland (IRMA)	25
Lithuania (AGATA)	29
Netherlands (Single Top 100)	69
New Zealand (Recorded Music NZ)	19
Norway (VG-lista)	26
Portugal (AFP)	71
South Africa Streaming (TOSAC)	17
Sweden (Sverigetopplistan)	64
Switzerland (Schweizer Hitparade)	39
UK Singles (Official Charts)	31
UK Hip Hop/R&B (Official Charts)	11
US Billboard Hot 100	22
US Hot R&B/Hip-Hop Songs (Billboard)	5
US Rhythmic Airplay (Billboard)	10

=== Year-end charts ===
2022 year-end chart performance for "True Love"
Chart (2022)	Position
US Hot R&B/Hip-Hop Songs (Billboard)	91

== Certifications ==
Certifications for "True Love"
Region	Certification	Certified units/sales
New Zealand (RMNZ)	Gold	15,000^{‡}
United Kingdom (BPI)	Silver	200,000^{‡}
^{‡} Sales+streaming figures based on certification alone.
