= Vice City (XXXTentacion song) =

2022 single by XXXTentacion

"vice city"

Single by XXXTentacion

from the album XXX (Unmastered) and Look at Me: The Album
- Released: March 5, 2014 (SoundCloud); January 28, 2022 (Columbia re-release)
- Recorded: 2014
- Genre: Alternative hip hop; SoundCloud rap
- Length: 3:40
- Label: Bad Vibes Forever; Columbia
- Songwriters: Jahseh Onfroy; Steve Brown
- Producer: Canis Major

XXXTentacion singles chronology
"Riot" (2020)	"vice city" (2022)	"True Love" (2022)

"Vice City" (stylized in all lowercase) is a song by American rapper and singer XXXTentacion. It was originally released on SoundCloud on March 5, 2014, before being re-released posthumously for streaming services on January 28, 2022. The song was produced by Canis Major and heavily samples the 2013 song "Sing to the Moon" by British soul artist Laura Mvula.

The name of the song was inspired by the video game Grand Theft Auto: Vice City (2002), which was one of XXXTentacion's favorite video games.

== Background ==
"Vice City" was one of XXXTentacion's first songs to be released on his SoundCloud account and has been named as a classic in the SoundCloud rap era. It was released with XXXTentacion's first mixtape on SoundCloud, XXX (Unmastered). It was announced that the track would finally be made available to streaming services such as Spotify and Apple Music on January 23, 2022, which would have been his 24th birthday. The single is also featured as the first track on the posthumous compilation album, Look at Me: The Album.

== Charts ==
Chart performance for "Vice City"
Chart (2022)	Peak position
Global 200 (Billboard)	143
New Zealand Hot Singles (RMNZ)	5
US Billboard Hot 100	89
US Hot R&B/Hip-Hop Songs (Billboard)	32

== Certifications ==
Certifications for "Vice City"
Region	Certification	Certified units/sales
New Zealand (RMNZ)	Gold	15,000^{‡}
United States (RIAA)	Gold	500,000^{‡}
^{‡} Sales+streaming figures based on certification alone.
