= Michael Usan =

American judge

Michael A. Usan

Judge of the Seventeenth Judicial Circuit Court of Florida
- Incumbent
- Assumed office January 12, 2010
- Appointed by: Charlie Crist
- Preceded by: Linda L. Vitale

Personal details
- Citizenship: United States
- Parents: Arthur M.; Lillian Usan
- Education: University of Minnesota (BA); Wake Forest University (JD)
- Occupation: Judge
- Profession: Judge

Michael Allen Usan is an American lawyer and legal official who has served as a judge in the Seventeenth Judicial Circuit Court of Florida since 2010.

Usan gained national attention in 2023 as the presiding judge of the trial for the murderers of rapper/singer Jahseh Onfroy, best known as XXXTentacion.

== Life and career ==
Usan graduated from the University of Minnesota for his B.A. in 1984 and from Wake Forest University for his J.D. in 1987. Usan was a Judge Advocate General in the U.S. Air Force from 1987 to 1992. Prior to entering private practice in 1993, he also served as a prosecutor for a brief period of time in Broward County. Up until his court appointment in 2010, he practiced criminal defense law in Fort Lauderdale.

=== XXXTentacion murder trial ===
Usan gained national attention as the presiding judge over the trial for three of the murderers of rapper and singer-songwriter Jahseh Onfroy (XXXTentacion). He gained attention for his sternness towards the defense attorneys for Onfroy's murderers. He was also commended for his harshness towards the murderers and his compassion towards Onfroy's family and fanbase, delivering a direct speech to Onfroy's family and fans about Onfroy's legacy before the murderers' sentencing, and with Usan stating to shooter Michael Boatwright at his sentencing that he is glad that Boatwright will die in prison. He sentenced two of the three murderers to the mandatory life in prison without the possibility of parole, and sentenced Michael Boatwright, the shooter, to an uncommonly high sentence for a single murder: two consecutive life sentences without the possibility of parole, plus another consecutive 30 years.
