= In His Own Words =

2022 documentary film

- Official release poster
- Directed by: Rob Stone; Lesley Steele
- Produced by: Rob Stone; Cleopatra Bernard; Solomon Sobande; Bob Celestin, Esq.; Jon Cohen; Anthony Holland; Darcy McKinnon; Chloe Campion; Seven Small
- Starring: XXXTentacion (archival footage); Cleopatra Bernard; Solomon Sobande
- Edited by: Lesley Steele
- Music by: XXXTentacion; Melisa McGregor
- Production company: Fader Films
- Distributed by: Altavod
- Release date: November 22, 2022
- Running time: 55 minutes
- Country: United States
- Language: English

In His Own Words is a 2022 documentary film, directed by Rob Stone and Lesley Steele. It focuses on previously unseen interviews and series of footage of the rapper and singer-songwriter XXXTentacion. It premiered on the film streaming platform Altavod on November 22, 2022. It is considered a companion film to the May 2022 XXXTentacion documentary, Look at Me.

The film was first announced on October 25, 2022. The film began production in 2017, alongside the film Look at Me. The documentary contains footage from X in 2017.

== Synopsis ==
In His Own Words is described in the official synopsis as "an incredibly raw, unique perspective into the mind of Jahseh Onfroy, which sees the late cultural mover give insight on topics that many artists don't explore in a public manner, ranging from how he views himself, to his place in the world and society as a whole."

The film focuses on unseen interviews conducted by Fader Films in 2017. It features seldom narration, mainly focusing on X's perspective on topics of his career, music, early life, and media controversy. He expressed regret for handling certain controversies in manners he had previously. For example, X said he wish he clarified further on topics in his 2016 interview with Adam22 on the No Jumper podcast. X mentioned that he should have been clearer in the podcast in which he described a fight with a gay cell mate in juvy, stating he wished he had clarified that he did not attack his cell mate for the fact that he was gay, calling his discussion of the topic "negligent and stupid", but stated, "Everybody needs to realize at the time I was still a kid." The mentioned juvy fight was a topic which was a matter of controversy in news and social media during his career. X also reiterates his resentment towards his father due to the abuse he endured from him. When asked by an interviewer what his relationship with his father was like as an adult, X sarcastically asked, "What's a father?"

== Cast ==
- XXXTentacion (archival footage)
- Cleopatra Bernard
- Solomon Sobande

== See also ==
- Look at Me (2022 film)
