= King of the Dead (song) =

2015 song by XXXTentacion

Song by XXXTentacion

from the album Members Only, Vol. 2 and Look at Me: The Album
- Released: October 23, 2015 (SoundCloud) June 10, 2022 (Columbia re-release)
- Recorded: 2015
- Genre: Experimental hip-hop
- Length: 3:39
- Label: Bad Vibes Forever; Columbia
- Songwriters: Jahseh Onfroy; Elliott Onofrio; Spencer Gatts; Pyotr Ivanovich Turchaninov
- Producers: Fifty Grand; Hellion

"King of the Dead" is a song by American rapper and singer XXXTentacion. It was originally released independently on SoundCloud and included on American hip hop collective Members Only second mixtape, Members Only, Vol. 2 released on October 23, 2015, as the sixth track. The song was later re-released commercially as the sixth track on the posthumous compilation album, Look at Me: The Album, released on June 10, 2022, through Bad Vibes Forever and Columbia Records.

The track was produced by Fifty Grand and Hellion, and samples "Cherubic Hymn" performed by the Novospassky Monastery Choir, and composed by Russian composer and choirmaster Pyotr Turchaninov. This song was described by XXL as one of X's "best deep cuts".

== Background ==
"King of the Dead" was among XXXTentacion's early releases on SoundCloud, and was one of his most notable tracks prior to his mainstream breakthrough.

The song was co-produced by Fifty Grand, whose production style has been described as dark and experimental within the underground SoundCloud hip-hop scene.

== Personnel ==
Credits adapted from Tidal.

- Jahseh Onfroy - performer, songwriter
- Elliott Onofrio - songwriter, producer
- Spencer Gatts - songwriter, producer
- Pyotr Ivanovich Turchaninov - songwriter

== Charts ==
Chart performance for "King of the Dead"
Chart (2022)	Peak position
New Zealand Hot Singles (RMNZ)	40
