= Natural Born Losers =

Studio album by Nicole Dollanganger
- Released: October 9, 2015
- Genre: Alternative rock; alt-pop
- Length: 39:29
- Label: Eerie Organization

Nicole Dollanganger chronology
Observatory Mansions (2014)	Natural Born Losers (2015)	Heart Shaped Bed (2018)

Natural Born Losers is the fifth album by singer-songwriter Nicole Dollanganger. It marks her first album professionally recorded in a studio. It was released digitally on October 9, 2015 by Eerie Organization, an independent label founded by Grimes and Jaime Brooks.

== Background ==
Natural Born Losers marked Dollanganger's first album to be recorded in a studio, as her previous releases had all been self-recorded in her home. Canadian singer and songwriter Grimes, impressed by demos Dollanganger had released for the album, founded an independent label, Eerie Organization, to help release the finished record. "It blew up my brain so hard that I literally started Eerie to fucking put it out because it’s a crime against humanity for this music not to be heard," she said.

== Release ==
Eerie Organization released Natural Born Losers digitally on October 9, 2015. In Autumn 2023 the album saw its first physical release, and was pressed on cassette and CD in limited quantities. The album was released on LP for the first time on November 22, 2024, by the independent record store Vertigo Vinyl.

== Reception ==
Professional ratings
Review scores
Source	Rating
Exclaim!	7/10
Pitchfork	6.6/10
Rolling Stone	3/5 stars
Spin	7/10

Ian Gormely of Exclaim! awarded the album seven out of ten stars, writing that it "finds the singer dropping the Tumblr-core cultural pastiches of her past for a more insular world, making this her most intimate recording to date. Despite upping the fidelity though, she keeps things simple, adding droning guitars or some pounding drums when necessary. Otherwise, she uses the studio to add presence to her music, imbuing these 11 songs with a floating ambiance that draws direct lines to artists like Julee Cruise and This Mortal Coil." David Sackllah of Consequence of Sound noted that "Dollanganger excels at taking the familiar and twisting it into something obscene. She isn’t trying to reinvent the wheel, but she doesn’t have to. She’s woven an intricate tapestry of bloodshed into an astounding debut that magnifies the boldness of her songwriting."

Hazel Cills of Pitchfork awarded the album a 6.6 out of 10 rating, writing that Dollanganger's "portrait of tortured sexuality and death is tethered to an ambiguous portrait of backwoods living, a North American wilderness where anything and anyone can be hunted. Natural Born Losers plays like a work of wicked anti-pastoralism from the perspective of a bad girl who stares out at her rustic life with not wide-eyed romanticism but sad familiarity and resignation." David Turner of Rolling Stone awarded the album three out of five stars, noting: "Even Dollanganger’s most affectionate songs have an unshakeable sense of isolation (see the twisted alt-pop dream “You’re So Cool”). Dollanganger began as a bedroom-recording artist, but Natural Born Losers shows that her music is ready to escape those wallpapered confines."

== Track listing ==
All tracks are written by Nicole Dollanganger, except for "A Marvelous Persona" which is co-written by Ryan Goodman.

Natural Born Losers track listing
No.	Title	Length
1.	"Poacher's Pride"	2:19
2.	"Mean"	4:13
3.	"White Trashing"	4:54
4.	"Swan"	2:31
5.	"In the Land"	4:24
6.	"Alligator Blood"	3:57
7.	"Executioner"	4:26
8.	"American Tradition"	3:54
9.	"Angels of Porn (II)"	3:23
10.	"A Marvelous Persona"	1:13
11.	"You're So Cool"	4:15
Total length:		39:29

== Personnel ==
- Nicole Dollanganger – instrumentation, vocals, composition, lyrics, recording
- Ryan Goodman – additional instrumentation, recording

== Charts ==
Chart performance for Natural Born Losers
Chart (2026)	Peak position
US Top Album Sales (Billboard)	20
