= Yung Bratz =

2016 song by XXXTentacion

Song by XXXTentacion

from the album Revenge
- Released: July 4, 2016 (SoundCloud); May 16, 2017 (Empire re-release)
- Recorded: 2016
- Genre: Screamo rap
- Length: 1:41
- Label: Bad Vibes Forever; Empire
- Songwriter: Jahseh Onfroy
- Producer: Stain

"Yung Bratz" (often stylized as "YuNg BrAtZ") is a song by American rapper and singer XXXTentacion. It was originally released independently on SoundCloud as a standalone track on July 4, 2016, and later re-released commercially on his debut commercial mixtape, Revenge, which came out on May 16, 2017, through Empire Distribution. The song is also included on XXXTentacion's only compilation album, Look at Me: The Album, where it appears as the fourteenth song on the project.

The track was produced by Stain and was ranked 20th on XXL's list of "The 30 Best XXXTentacion Songs, Ranked".

== Background ==
"Yung Bratz" was among XXXTentacion's early releases on SoundCloud and became one of his most notable tracks prior to his mainstream breakthrough. Complex noted that early singles like "Yung Bratz" helped XXXTentacion gain wider recognition and secure a record deal. Vibe described the song as a "scream-o rap song". XXL described "Yung Bratz" as a track with blown-out bass, raucous screaming, and cartoonish vocal inflections that perfectly match its title, serving as a strong snapshot of X at his rawest.

== Personnel ==
Credits adapted from Apple Music.

- Jahseh Onfroy - performer, songwriter
- Stain - composer, producer

== Certifications ==
Region	Certification	Certified units/sales
New Zealand (RMNZ)	Platinum	30,000^{‡}
United Kingdom (BPI)	Silver	200,000^{‡}
^{‡} Sales+streaming figures based on certification alone.
