= ImSippinTeaInYoHood =

2016 song by XXXTentacion

Song by XXXTentacion

from the album Look at Me: The Album
- Released: February 25, 2016 (SoundCloud); June 10, 2022 (Columbia re-release)
- Recorded: 2016
- Genre: Trap metal; SoundCloud rap; hip-hop
- Length: 2:53
- Label: Bad Vibes Forever; Columbia
- Songwriters: Jahseh Onfroy; Ronald Spence Jr.
- Producer: Ronny J

"ImSippinTeaInYoHood" (stylized as #ImSippinTeaInYoHood) is a song by American rapper and singer XXXTentacion. It was originally released independently on SoundCloud as a standalone track on February 25, 2016. The song was later re-released commercially as the eighth track on the posthumous compilation album, Look at Me: The Album, released on June 10, 2022, through Bad Vibes Forever and Columbia Records.

The song was produced by American producer Ronny J and was described by XXL as one of X's "best deep cuts".

== Background ==
"ImSippinTeaInYoHood" was among XXXTentacion's early releases on SoundCloud and became one of his most notable tracks prior to his mainstream breakthrough. This song is the third diss track from X aimed at fellow Florida rapper SpaceGhostPurrp, following his features on Denzel Curry's diss tracks "SpaceGhostPussy" and "Purrposely", which were part of the feud sparked by SpaceGhostPurrp’s controversial remarks about the late A$AP Yams. On SoundCloud, "ImSippinTeaInYoHood" was associated with the hashtag #SpaceGhostTwerk.

In 2019, XXL highlighted the track as one of XXXTentacion's notable earlier songs that should appear on a compilation.

== Personnel ==
Credits adapted from Apple Music.

- Jahseh Onfroy – voice, songwriter
- Ronald Spence Jr. – songwriter, producer

== Charts ==
Chart performance for "ImSippinTeaInYoHood"
Chart (2022)	Peak position
New Zealand Hot Singles (RMNZ)	38
