= Revenge (mixtape) =

Mixtape by XXXTentacion
- Released: May 16, 2017
- Genre: Hip hop
- Length: 18:13 (Note: "Valentine" is not available on streaming services as of 2026; its absence reduces the mixtape's length to 15:41.)
- Label: Empire
- Producer: XXXTentacion; Stain; Jimmy Duval; Rojas; Khaed; Diplo; King Henry; Mikey the Magician; King Yosef; P. Soul

XXXTentacion chronology
Willy Wonka Was a Child Murderer (2016)	Revenge (2017)	Members Only, Vol. 3 (2017)

Singles from Revenge
- 1. "Look at Me!" Released: February 20, 2017

Revenge is the second and final solo mixtape by American rapper XXXTentacion, released on May 16, 2017, by Empire Distribution. It consists of seven previously released songs that were available for streaming on XXXTentacion's SoundCloud profile and the original song "Looking for a Star". The mixtape features guest appearances from Ski Mask the Slump God, Kin$oul, and Killstation. It was preceded by the lead single "Look at Me!", which peaked at number 34 on the Billboard Hot 100.

Revenge debuted at number 76 on the Billboard 200 for the chart dated June 3, 2017, and initially peaked at number 44. It later peaked at number 28 following XXXTentacion's murder on June 18, 2018. On March 14, 2019, the mixtape was certified gold by the Recording Industry Association of America (RIAA), for sales over 500,000 units.

== Promotion ==
The lead single from the tape, called "Look at Me", premiered on December 30, 2015, on SoundCloud. The song was later released to iTunes as a single on January 29, 2016, until it was later re-released for digital download again with a remastered and clean version of the song on February 20, 2017, by Empire Distribution.

== Critical reception ==
Professional ratings
Review scores
Source	Rating
Salute Magazine	5/5 stars

Adrian Glover of Salute Magazine lauded Revenge, giving it a full 5/5 rating, praising XXXTentacion as music's new "jig-saw genius", and commending the musical diversity, risks and potential of the project. He also went on to further praise XXXTentacion as "someone that could evoke Miles Davis’ weirdo genius".

== Commercial performance ==
Revenge debuted at number 76 on the Billboard 200 for the chart dated June 3, 2017, and has since peaked at number 44. It later peaked at number 28 following XXXTentacion's murder on June 18, 2018. On March 14, 2019, the mixtape was certified gold by the Recording Industry Association of America (RIAA), for sales over 500,000 units.

== Track listing ==
Revenge
No.	Title	Writer(s)	Producer(s)	Length
1.	"Look at Me!"	Jahseh Onfroy; Jimmy Duval; Cristian Rojas; Mark Lawrence Jr.	Duval; Rojas	2:06
2.	"I Don't Wanna Do This Anymore"	Onfroy; Jeryn Peters	Khaed	1:27
3.	"Looking for a Star"	Onfroy; Thomas Pentz; Henry Allen	Diplo; King Henry	2:17
4.	"Valentine"	Onfroy; Brendan Canning; Kevin Drew; Sam Goldberg Jr.; John McEntire; Justin Peroff; James Shaw; Charles Spearin; Andrew Whiteman	XXXTentacion; Mikey the Magician	2:32
5.	"King"	Onfroy	King Yosef	1:52
6.	"Slipknot" (featuring Kin$oul and Killstation)	Onfroy; Brandon Beazer	P. Soul	3:29
7.	"YuNg BrAtZ"	Onfroy; Darius Love	Stain	1:41
8.	"RIP Roach" (featuring Ski Mask the Slump God)	Onfroy; Stokeley Goulbourne; Darius Love	Stain	2:49
Total length:				18:13

=== Notes ===
- "Valentine" was removed from streaming services due to an uncleared sample, reducing the mixtape to seven tracks.
- "Look at Me!" samples "Changes" by Mala.
- "I Don't Wanna Do This Anymore" samples "Whitley (Part 1)" by NOVA.
- "Valentine" samples "Sweetest Kill" by Broken Social Scene.
- "Slipknot" was also released on Members Only, Vol. 3.
- "YuNg BrAtZ" samples a video of XXXTentacion in a fight in 2016.
- "RIP Roach" samples "The Fog" by SpaceGhostPurrp.

== Charts ==
=== Weekly charts ===
Chart (2017–18)	Peak position
Canadian Albums (Billboard)	36
Danish Albums (Hitlisten)	31
Estonian Albums (IFPI)	22
Finnish Albums (Suomen virallinen lista)	38
New Zealand Albums (RMNZ)	35
Norwegian Albums (VG-lista)	21
Swedish Albums (Sverigetopplistan)	42
US Billboard 200	28
US Top R&B/Hip-Hop Albums (Billboard)	15

=== Year-end charts ===
Chart (2017)	Position
US Top R&B/Hip-Hop Albums (Billboard)	93
Chart (2018)	Position
Estonian Albums (IFPI)	54
Icelandic Albums (Plötutíóindi)	81
US Billboard 200	196

== Certifications ==
Region	Certification	Certified units/sales
Denmark (IFPI Danmark)	Gold	10,000^{‡}
Italy (FIMI)	Platinum	100,000^{‡}
United States (RIAA)	Gold	500,000^{‡}
^{‡} Sales+streaming figures based on certification alone.
