= Nicole Dollanganger =

Canadian singer-songwriter (born 1991)

- Born: Nicole Ann Bell; September 8, 1991 (age 35); Scarborough, Ontario, Canada
- Genres: Lo-fi; alternative rock; folk pop; dream pop; bedroom pop; slowcore
- Occupations: Singer-songwriter; artist
- Instruments: Vocals; guitar
- Years active: 2011–present
- Labels: Eerie Organization; Crystal Math; Run for Cover
- Website: nicoledollanganger.com

Nicole Ann Bell (born September 8, 1991), known professionally as Nicole Dollanganger, is a Canadian-American singer-songwriter. Dollanganger's music is characterized by a feminine, high-pitched vocal style, minimalist instrumentation, and lyrical themes frequently pertaining to true crime, violence, sexuality, and romance. Her music has been described as "lo-fi", "atmospheric", and "folk", and is associated with the folk, folk pop, bedroom pop, slowcore and dream pop genres.

In 2015, Rolling Stone named Dollanganger in an article titled "10 New Artists You Need to Know," stating that her "gothic folk songs," described as "macabre millennial nightmares, softened by dream-pop tranquilizers, reverberating from a casket-shaped music box," are "as beautiful as they are brutal." Most of her releases were released as digital-only, and a majority of them were initially published by Dollanganger herself through the music website Bandcamp. Her stage name comes from the Dollanganger Series of novels by V. C. Andrews.

== Early life ==
Dollanganger was born on September 8, 1991, in Scarborough, a suburban district in Toronto, Ontario in Canada. Dollanganger grew up between Whitchurch-Stouffville, Ontario, and southwest Florida in the United States. Dollanganger would later go on to cite musicians her father listened to during her childhood, such as American country music singers Bobbie Gentry and Tammy Wynette, as influential on her own musical style.

== Career ==
=== 2010–2014: Career beginnings ===
Dollanganger first began writing, producing, and recording music in 2010. She recorded original songs, as well as covers, in her bedroom and bathroom on her MacBook, using the digital audio software GarageBand. In 2011, Dollanganger began posting her music on Tumblr, where she also posted her visual artwork, as well as on Myspace, and Bandcamp. Many of the original songs she posted would later be included as tracks on her 2012 debut album, Curdled Milk.

Curdled Milk, written, produced, and recorded entirely by Dollanganger in 2011 and early 2012, was self-released online as her debut album and first record on July 13, 2012. She created the artwork used on the album cover (as well as two alternative album covers, featuring a photograph she took of herself and drew onto.) Shortly after releasing the album, Dollanganger was admitted to a hospital program as she was suffering from anorexia nervosa, anorexia athletica, and bulimia nervosa. After being released from the program, she went on bed rest for a year, during which she dropped out of Ryerson University, where she had been studying film. In a 2014 interview, Dollanganger reflected on how this experience impacted her music and life.

"[Curdled Milk]'s creation coincided with an illness I was battling, and right after I released it, I went on bed rest for a year & completely shut the world out. I could probably count on my hands how many times I left the house throughout that year, actually. And after that period, I was a completely different person. Everything in my life had changed and I think for the first time I kind of came into myself. In that regard, I feel I have changed a lot."

Dollanganger continued creating music and posting her work online. In November 2012 she self-released her second album, Flowers of Flesh and Blood. On February 20, 2013, Dollanganger would release her third album, Ode to Dawn Wiener: Embarrassing Love Songs.

On January 10, 2014, Dollanganger released her fourth album, Observatory Mansions. The title of the nine-track album was adopted from Observatory Mansions, the 2000 debut novel by English novelist Edward Carey. The album was recorded in 2013 and would be the last record Dollanganger would write, produce, and record entirely on her own. Around a month prior the album's release, on December 9, 2013, Dollanganger had posted on social media a tentative track list for an untitled record she was working on — the record would later be revealed to be Observatory Mansions, but the seventh track on the tentative track list, "Hymns for the Small Towns", was not included on the album. "Hymns for the Small Towns" is since unreleased.

Dollanganger hand-made a limited number of physical copies of her first four records (on cassette tape format and CD-R disc format), intending to sell them.

=== 2015–2016: Eerie Organization and Natural Born Losers ===
In 2015, Dollanganger, alongside Canadian singer and musician Grimes, opened for American singer-songwriter Lana Del Rey at a Toronto concert. Grimes, a fan of Dollanganger's work, later announced that she would be creating her own record label, Eerie Organization, particularly to help release Dollanganger's album Natural Born Losers, stating "It's a crime against humanity for this music not to be heard". In October and November 2015, Dollanganger was a supporting musician in Grimes' Rhinestone Cowgirls Tour.

In March 2016, Dollanganger's song "Chapel" (which would later be included on her 2018 album Heart Shaped Bed, released on Grimes' record label Eerie Organization, which had since been renamed Crystal Math Music) was featured in the fourteenth episode of the sixth season of the television series The Walking Dead, "Twice as Far". Later, from August to September 2016, Dollanganger embarked on a co-headlining tour across the United States with bands Elvis Depressedly and Teen Suicide.

=== 2017–2020: Heart Shaped Bed, touring, and collaborations ===
In February 2017, Dollanganger was the support act for the last leg of hardcore band Code Orange's Forever tour. In May 2017, she collaborated with grindcore band Full of Hell by providing clean vocals on the title track of their LP Trumpeting Ecstasy.

In 2018, she announced her upcoming album Heart Shaped Bed. On March 30, she released the first five tracks of the album only on her Bandcamp page. In June, she joined Code Orange for select dates for their The New Reality tour, alongside acts Vein and Twitching Tongues. Later, on October 26, Heart Shaped Bed was properly released and included a newly recorded version of the single "Chapel", produced by Arthur Rizk.

In 2020, she collaborated with musical duo 100 Gecs, Craig Owens, and Fall Out Boy on a remix of the 100 gecs song "Hand Crushed by a Mallet" for the album 1000 Gecs and the Tree of Clues, a remix album of 1000 Gecs (2019).

=== 2021–present: Married in Mount Airy ===
On March 31, 2021, Dollanganger released a new song "Whispering Glades". On November 4, 2022, Dollanganger released a new song "Gold Satin Dreamer". A few weeks later, Dollanganger released "Runnin' Free". All three singles ended up being included on Dollanganger's seventh studio album titled Married in Mount Airy, which was released on January 6, 2023. Vinyl record releases of her most recent three albums were made available in limited stock on the week of November 20, 2024.

== Discography ==
=== Studio albums ===
List of studio albums, with selected details
Title	Album details
Curdled Milk	Released: July 13, 2012; Label: Self-released; Format: Digital download, streaming
Flowers of Flesh and Blood	Released: November 25, 2012; Label: Self-released; Format: Digital download, streaming
Ode to Dawn Wiener: Embarrassing Love Songs	Released: February 20, 2013; Label: Self-released; Format: Digital download, streaming
Observatory Mansions	Released: January 10, 2014; Label: Self-released; Format: Digital download, streaming
Natural Born Losers	Released: October 9, 2015; Label: Eerie Organization; Format: Digital download, streaming
Heart Shaped Bed	Released: October 26, 2018 (Note: The first five tracks from the album were made available exclusively on Bandcamp on March 30, 2018.); Label: Crystal Math Music, Eerie Organization; Format: Digital download, streaming
Married in Mount Airy	Released: January 6, 2023; Label: Self-released; Format: Digital download, streaming

=== Singles ===
List of singles, with year released and album name shown
Title	Year	Album
"Chapel" (Note: The track appears on the 2016 Run for Cover CD and cassette reissue of Ode to Dawn Wiener: Embarrassing Love Songs.)	2016	Non-album singles
"Observatory Mansions II" (Note: The track appears on the 2016 Run for Cover CD and cassette reissue of Observatory Mansions.)	2016	Non-album singles
"Lemonade"	2018	Heart Shaped Bed
"Whispering Glades"	2021	Married in Mount Airy
"Gold Satin Dreamer"	2022	Married in Mount Airy
"Runnin' Free"	2022	Married in Mount Airy
"Have You Seen Me?"	2025	Non-album single
