= RIP Roach =

2016 song by XXXTentacion featuring Ski Mask the Slump God

Song by XXXTentacion featuring Ski Mask the Slump God

from the album Revenge
- Released: May 12, 2016 (SoundCloud); May 16, 2017 (Empire re-release)
- Recorded: 2016
- Genre: Trap metal; SoundCloud rap; hip-hop
- Length: 2:50
- Label: Bad Vibes Forever; Empire
- Songwriters: Jahseh Onfroy; Stokeley Goulbourne
- Producer: Stain

"RIP Roach" (originally titled "R.I.P ROACH EAST SIDE SOULJA") is a song by American rapper and singer XXXTentacion featuring fellow American rapper Ski Mask the Slump God. It was originally released independently on SoundCloud as a standalone track on May 12, 2016, before being included four days later on Drown in Designer (2016), the debut mixtape by Ski Mask the Slump God. The song was subsequently re-released commercially on XXXTentacion’s debut commercial mixtape, Revenge, on May 16, 2017, through Empire Distribution.

The track was produced by Stain and samples the 2013 song "The Fog" by American rapper SpaceGhostPurrp. "RIP Roach" was ranked 7th on XXL’s list of The 30 Best XXXTentacion Songs, Ranked.

== Background ==
"RIP Roach" was among XXXTentacion's early releases on SoundCloud and became one of his most notable tracks prior to his mainstream breakthrough. XXXTentacion stated on social media that the song was a tribute to a friend of his who died in 2016. XXL described the track as a blend of XXXTentacion's aggressive, scream-influenced delivery and chaotic energy with Ski Mask the Slump God's more laid-back flow and off-topic punchlines. The publication noted that although Ski Mask's verse appears stylistically disconnected from XXXTentacion's intensity, the contrast ultimately works by providing a brief reprieve from the song's heightened aggression.

== Personnel ==
Credits adapted from Apple Music.

- Jahseh Onfroy - performer, songwriter
- Stokeley Goulbourne - performer, songwriter
- Stain - composer, producer

== Certifications ==
| Region | Certification | Certified units/sales |
|---|---|---|
| New Zealand (RMNZ) | Gold | 15,000^{‡} |
^{‡} Sales+streaming figures based on certification alone.
