= Wifisfuneral =

American rapper (born 1997)

- Also known as: Weef; Wifi; Izzy Kill$
- Born: Isaih Rivera (Note: Wifisfuneral's birth name has sometimes been erroneously reported as Isaiah Rivera. He has clarified that his birth name is Isaih Rivera.); March 20, 1997 (age 29); New York City, U.S.
- Origin: West Palm Beach, Florida, U.S.
- Genres: Hip-hop; trap; SoundCloud rap; emo rap
- Occupations: Rapper; songwriter
- Years active: 2012–present
- Labels: Living Dead; ONErpm; Alamo; Interscope; Empire
- Formerly of: Members Only

Isaih Rivera (born March 20, 1997), known professionally as Wifisfuneral, is an American rapper. Best known for his association with fellow South Florida rapper XXXTentacion, he was chosen as part of XXL magazine's Annual Freshman Class in 2018. That same year, he signed with Interscope Records, although he released no major projects under the label. In early 2020, Wifisfuneral announced his retirement; however, this proved to be short-lived as he released his debut studio album, Pain? in August of that year.

== Early life ==
Isaih Rivera was born on March 20, 1997, in the Bronx borough of New York City, to a Puerto Rican mother and a Jamaican father. Rivera was raised by his mother. His biological father, who was a freestyle battle rapper in The Bronx, left the family when Rivera was only three years old. When he turned seven, the family moved to West Palm Beach, Florida. His mother and stepfather later broke up when Rivera was 12.

Rivera was originally known as Izzy Kill$, and was part of a musical duo named Wifisfuneral which consisted of him and close friend DJ Scheme, but when the two would go their musical separate ways, Rivera would continue to use the name as a solo artist. Rivera's interest in hip-hop began when he first watched the Notorious B.I.G. tribute "Mo Money Mo Problems" music video with Puff Daddy and Mase.

== Career ==
=== 2016–2017: Early career Black Heart Revenge, When Hell Falls, & Boy Who Cried Wolf ===
After dropping out of high school and being kicked out of his house during his sophomore year, Rivera began working on his dream of success in the hip-hop industry. While recording music during this time, he battled with substance abuse problems, including cocaine, xanax and Adderall. While working on Black Heart Revenge, Rivera unintentionally overdosed on cocaine and adderall. After recovering, he resumed his work on the album while getting his addiction under control.

Rivera released When Hell Falls on January 27, 2017. It was originally his suicide note, but he decided to turn it into an album instead. The project took a total of two weeks to complete, and upon release, attracted the attention of Alamo Records and Interscope Records, who he later signed with. His next mixtape, Boy Who Cried Wolf, named after the popular fable by Aesop, was released later in the year to positive reception. He was also a member of Members Only, a group originally created by XXXTentacion and Ski Mask the Slump God, from 2015 to 2017.

=== 2018: Ethernet, Conn3ct3d, Leave Me the Fuck Alone ===
Ethernet was first slated for a May 2018 release date, but was later pushed back due to sample and feature clearance issues. The album was officially released on June 8, 2018, delivering the recognizable song "Juveniles".

On June 12, 2018, Rivera was chosen as a member of the XXL Freshman Class of 2018, along with other emerging rappers, such as Ski Mask the Slump God, Lil Pump, and JID.

On January 11, 2019, Rivera released Conn3ct3d, a joint project with frequent collaborator Robb Banks. Conn3ct3d was led by two official singles. "Movin Slow" was released on April 19, 2018, and "Can't Feel My Face" was released on January 9, 2019. Two songs on the album were prematurely leaked before release. "EA" was leaked on April 8, 2018, and "Neglect" was leaked on October 15, 2018. The first song off the album to get a video release was the official single "Can't Feel My Face", which had debuted on February 5, 2019.

=== 2020: Pain? ===
Despite previously announcing his intention to retire from music, Wifisfuneral released his debut studio album, Pain?, on August 28, 2020. The concept of the album documents his trials and tribulations, he stated: "I've been working on the album for a couple of years now. It's been a really big process going from the underground circuit to making records. I didn't want to make it a regular rap album, I wanted every song to capture the emotion for anyone who's listening."

=== 2022: 4 Month Binge Before Revenge ===
Before the entirety of the album's release, Wifisfuneral had released "Hero 2 Zero / Zero 2 Hero", "Euphoria", "Dead Walk", and "Ahhhhhh" as singles. The mixtape was officially released on music streaming services on September 23, 2022.

4 Month Binge Before Revenge has a track list of 12 songs and a complete listen time of 25 minutes and 13 seconds. Despite wifisfuneral classifying this project as a mixtape in his discography, and with no additional artists being featured, the mixtape performed well in streams and publication. On September 26, just 3 days after the mixtape's release, Wifisfuneral premiered the music video for "Dead Walk" directed by Gabriel Smoak on his YouTube channel. Publication increased soon after the video's release with Lyrical Lemonade and other musical news outlets commenting on the project. The mixtape remains to stream well with 2 singles featured on the mixtape being among the most popular in his entire discography on Spotify's platform.

== Discography ==
=== Studio albums ===
- Pain? (2020)

=== Mixtapes ===
- WinterJacket (2012)
- HXPELESS YXUTH (2012)
- The Great Depression (2012)
- 2005ViaMySpace (2013)
- Wifisfuneral 2 (2015)
- Black Heart Revenge (2016)
- When Hell Falls (2017)
- Boy Who Cried Wolf (2017)
- Ethernet Vol. 1 (2018)
- CONN3CT3D (with Robb Banks) (2019)
- Ethernet Vol. 2 (2019)
- Ev3rything Sucks (2019)
- 4 Month Binge Before Revenge (2022)
- Black Heart Revenge 2 (2023)
- Boywhocriedwolf2 (2026)

=== EPs ===
- The Vegeta EP (2012)
- Six Hundred & Sixty 6 (2013)
- Wifisfuneral (2014)
- Why Am I Alive? (2014)
- Hunnid Degreez Latino Heat (2015)
- Today, War (2015)
- 18 (2015)
- This is Temporary (2015)
- 19 (2016)
- Last Time Doing Drugs (2018) (with Cris Dinero)
- Leave Me the Fuck Alone (2018)
- Smoking Mirrors (2021)
- Until We Meet Again (2022)
