= Members Only (hip-hop collective) =

American hip-hop collective

- Origin: Broward County, Florida, U.S.
- Genres: Hip-hop; comedy rap; trap; emo rap; cloud rap; SoundCloud rap
- Years active: 2014–2019
- Labels: Bad Vibes Forever; Empire
- Members: See below

Members Only was an American hip-hop collective from Broward County, Florida, formed in 2014. It was originally only a duo consisting of XXXTentacion and Ski Mask the Slump God after the two met in a juvenile detention center. It is closely associated with another collective named Very Rare, and members of both collectives also refer to themselves as VR All-Stars. Following the release of their fourth project, Members Only, Vol. 4, the collective has gone on an indefinite hiatus, with some of its most prominent members such as Craig Xen and Wifisfuneral exiting the group.

Three main members of the group have died: founding member XXXTentacion died on June 18, 2018 at the age of 20, due to a robbery which resulted in his murder. On May 16, 2019, Khaed, a producer for the group, died from ongoing heart complications at the age of 26. On April 24, 2022, former member Dylan "Tablez" Turner died from an accidental drug overdose.

== Members ==
=== Current members ===
- Ski Mask the Slump God (2014–present)
- absentwill (2014–present)
- Bass Santana (2015–present)
- Flyboy Tarantino (2015–present)
- Kid Trunks (2015–present)
- Kin$oul (2015–present)
- Kid Pronto (2015–present)
- Danny Towers (2015–present)
- ikabodVEINS (2015–present)
- Kilo Junior (2015–present)
- HighMyNamesRyan FKA RyBundy (2015-present)
- SB (2015–present)
- Bhris (2015–present)
- PRXZ (2015–present)
- Reddz (2015–present)
- Robb Banks (2016–present)
- DJ Scheme (2016–present)
- Tankhead666 (2016–present)
- Icecat Laflare (2016–present)
- Kidway (2017–present)
- Cujo (2018–present)
- Ratchet Roach (2018–present)

=== Former members ===
- XXXTentacion (2014–2018; his death)
- Tablez (2015–2016; died 2022)
- Wifisfuneral (2015–2017)
- Fukkit (2015–2017)
- ElGato (2015–2018)
- Khaed (2015–2019; his death)
- Killstation (2015–2019)
- Craig Xen (2015–2019)
- Cooliecut (2016–2019)
- Rawhool Mane (2018–2019)

- DJ Xantana

== Discography ==
=== Studio albums ===
Title	Album details	Peak chart positions									
Title	Album details	US	US R&B /HH	CAN	DEN	NLD	FIN	FRA	NOR	NZ	SWI
Members Only, Vol. 4	Released: January 23, 2019; Label: Bad Vibes Forever, Empire; Formats: Digital download, LP, streaming	18	11	15	25	39	48	100	32	29	71

=== Mixtapes ===
Title	Album details	Peak chart positions		
Title	Album details	US Comp.	BEL (Vl)	NLD
Members Only, Vol. 2	Released: October 23, 2015; Label: Self-released; Format: Digital download	—	—	—
Members Only, Vol. 3	Released: June 26, 2017; Label: Bad Vibes Forever, Empire; Formats: Digital download, LP, streaming	17	96	127

=== Extended plays ===
Title	Extended play details
Members Only, Vol. 1 (XXXTentacion & Ski Mask the Slump God only)	Released: April 20, 2015; Label: Self-released; Format: Digital download

=== Singles ===
Title	Song Details
"Imposter" (featuring Kid Trunks, Flyboy Tarantino, TankHead666, Cooliecut, Kin$oul and Bass Santana)	Released: August 17, 2017; Label: Self-released; Format: Digital download

== Tours ==
- The Revenge Tour (2017)
- Members Only vs. the World (2019)

== See also ==
- East Coast hip-hop
- XXXTentacion discography
- Ski Mask the Slump God discography
- List of East Coast hip-hop artists
