= Look at Me! =

2015 debut single by XXXTentacion

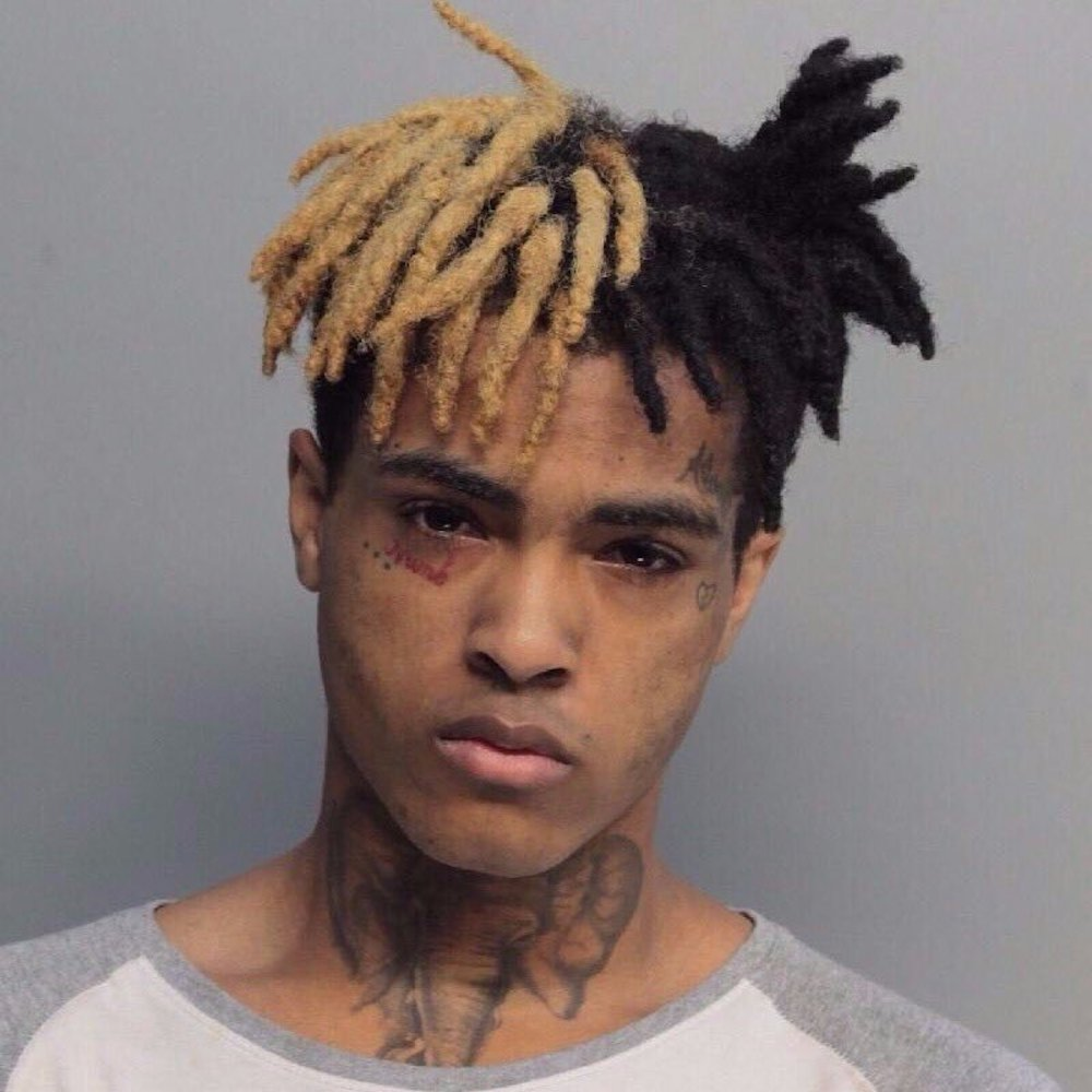
- The single's cover art of the Empire release, XXXTentacion's mugshot

Single by XXXTentacion

from the album Revenge
- Released: December 30, 2015 (SoundCloud); January 29, 2016 (iTunes); February 20, 2017 (Empire re-release)
- Recorded: 2015
- Genre: Trap metal; lo-fi
- Length: 2:31 (original); 2:06 (Revenge re-release); 2:19 (clean version)
- Label: Empire
- Songwriters: Jahseh Onfroy; Cristian Rojas; James Duval; Mark Lawrence
- Producers: Rojas; Jimmy Duval

XXXTentacion singles chronology
"Look at Me!" (2015)	"What in XXXTarnation" (2017)

Music video
- "Look at Me!" on YouTube

"Look at Me!" is the debut commercial single by American rapper XXXTentacion. The debut single premiered on December 30, 2015, on the SoundCloud account of Rojas, the song's co-producer, before initially being released for digital download as a single on January 29, 2016, becoming a sleeper hit in January 2017, in which the song was later re-released for digital download again with a remastered and clean version of the single on February 20, 2017, by Empire Distribution. The song serves as the lead single from his debut commercial mixtape Revenge. The track was produced by Rojas and Jimmy Duval, and heavily samples the 2007 song "Changes" by British dubstep DJ and record producer Mala.

The debut single peaked at number 34 on the US Billboard Hot 100. "Look at Me!" was certified Platinum by the Recording Industry Association of America (RIAA) on August 14, 2017, with over one million single-equivalent units. "Look at Me" is ranked as one of the 100 songs that defined the 2010s decade by Billboard.

== Background ==
In verified annotations added along with song's lyrics on Genius, Rojas, the song's co-producer, spoke about how the song came together:

One day me and X were sitting at the crib going through beats and he wasn't really rocking with any of them, and then the last one I showed him was that beat, and he was like, "Rojas, this is it!" In 15 minutes, it was done. X already knew the whole song in his head before he made it. He's creative as fuck. X decided to distort the whole track in one.

Rojas also spoke about the origin of the beat:

We made it at Jimmy Duval's Studio. The beat was actually made for Retch, when he came down to Miami after he had a show in Tampa. He was staying at Jimmy's crib after I introduced them, when me and Jimmy decided to work on some stuff for Retch. That's when we made the "Look At Me!" beat. We never got to send it to Retch because he went to jail and I lost contact with him and his management.

Rojas lastly talked about how they found the sample:

A couple months before I sampled it, I was listening to a song by Young Roddy called "Water" and I was fucking with him heavy. I thought the sample was really hard and I wanted to use it but I failed with it so many times before I got it right.

The song was originally listed as a feature of Rojas, who is also a DJ, before later being renamed as a whole following the initial iTunes release. The song's original cover art showed Zachary Stoddard, known as KidPronto, as a 12 year old with a blunt in his nose. The original photo was shared in a group chat.

== Composition ==
The track, which has a tempo of 139 BPM (beats per minute), heavily samples "Changes" by British dubstep DJ and record producer Mala. "Look at Me!" features an extremely heavy and distorted bass, creating an aggressive feeling throughout the track. While some criticized the heavy distortion to be a case of bad mixing, Rojas, the producer, said the poor mixing and distortion on the track was intentional to differentiate the rap from other popular hip hop rap singles at the time.

== Commercial performance ==
"Look at Me!" debuted at number 94 on US Billboard Hot 100 for the chart dated February 25, 2017, and peaked at number 34. The track charted for 20 weeks, becoming his longest charting song until the release of "SAD!" (later becoming his longest-charting track with 38 weeks on the chart). It is XXXTentacion's first charting single, later making it into the Billboard Year-End Hot 100 singles of 2017 at number 99. "Look at Me!" was certified 2× Platinum by the Recording Industry Association of America (RIAA) on July 31, 2019, with over two million units sold.

== Music video ==
The official music video for "Look at Me!" was released to XXXTentacion's YouTube channel on September 12, 2017. The video briefly plays the song before cutting to his song "Riot".

== Controversy ==
The song first received notable attention and controversy in early 2017 when Canadian rapper Drake used a similar rap flow from "Look at Me!" in an unreleased song. It sparked a viral surge in the song's popularity, as well as in Onfroy himself, while he was incarcerated at the time. Drake released the song "KMT" featuring English rapper Giggs on his commercial mixtape More Life, which was marketed as a "playlist."

The debut single received further controversy in September 2017 when the music video was released depicting a white child being hanged on stage in addition to other various depictions of murder and death. Although heavily criticized by conservative news outlets, Onfroy clarified via Instagram that the video was meant to be taken seriously as a form of art, and that it was a form of shock value. Soon after, Onfroy claimed on an Instagram video that a member of the Ku Klux Klan had threatened him for the depictions in the debut single.

== Charts ==
=== Weekly charts ===
Chart (2017–18)	Peak position
Austria (Ö3 Austria Top 40)	64
Canada Hot 100 (Billboard)	33
France (SNEP)	61
Hungary (Single Top 40)	36
Hungary (Stream Top 40)	35
Ireland (IRMA)	61
Italy (FIMI)	98
Latvia (DigiTop100)	87
Netherlands (Single Top 100)	73
Scottish Singles Sales (Official Charts)	65
Sweden (Sverigetopplistan)	79
Switzerland (Schweizer Hitparade)	50
UK Singles (Official Charts)	95
US Billboard Hot 100	34
US Hot R&B/Hip-Hop Songs (Billboard)	18

=== Year-end charts ===
Chart (2017)	Position
US Billboard Hot 100	99
US Hot R&B/Hip-Hop Songs (Billboard)	47

== Certifications ==
Region	Certification	Certified units/sales
Denmark (IFPI Danmark)	Platinum	90,000^{‡}
France (SNEP)	Platinum	200,000^{‡}
Italy (FIMI)	Platinum	50,000^{‡}
New Zealand (RMNZ)	3× Platinum	90,000^{‡}
Spain (Promusicae)	Platinum	60,000^{‡}
United Kingdom (BPI)	Platinum	600,000^{‡}
United States (RIAA)	5× Platinum	5,000,000^{‡}
^{‡} Sales+streaming figures based on certification alone.
