= Murder of XXXTentacion =

2018 murder in Deerfield Beach, Florida, U.S

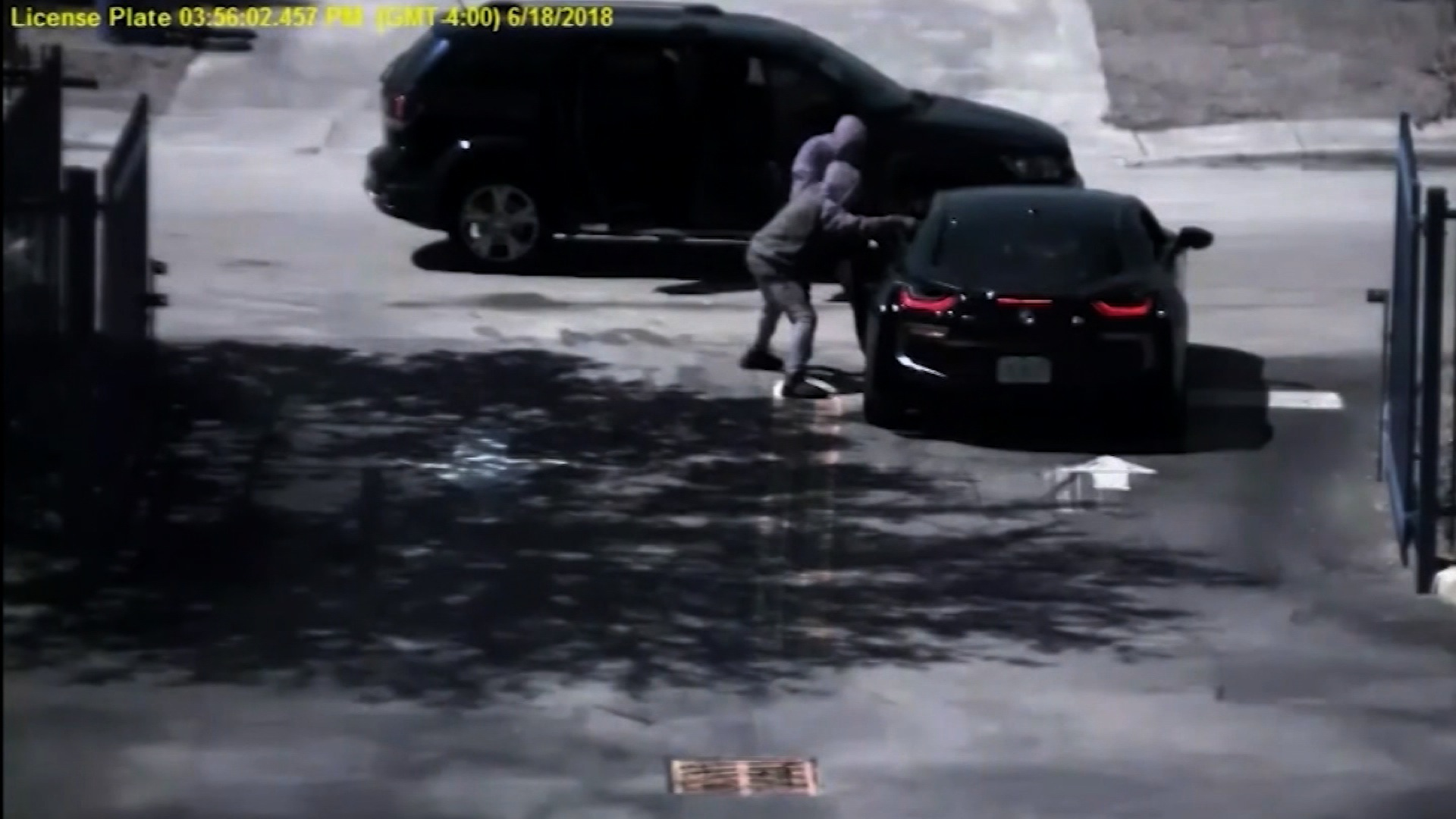
- Michael Boatwright and Trayvon Newsome confronting Onfroy in his vehicle

- Deerfield Beach (Florida) Deerfield Beach (the US) Location of Onfroy's murder in Deerfield Beach, Florida
- Location: 26.2765890, -80.1142315 Deerfield Beach, Florida, U.S.
- Date: June 18, 2018; 8 years ago 3:56 p.m. (EDT)
- Target: Jahseh Dwayne Ricardo Onfroy, also known as XXXTentacion
- Attack type: Murder by shooting, assassination, armed robbery
- Weapon: Tippmann Arms M4-22 Micro Compact 7″ .22 LR AR Pistol.
- Victims: Jahseh Dwayne Ricardo Onfroy, also known as XXXTentacion
- Perpetrators: Michael Sherrell Boatwright; Trayvon Demarcus Newsome; Dedrick Devonshay Williams; Robert Allen IV
- Motive: Robbery (Note: The motive for Boatwright murdering Onfroy is unclear.)
- Verdict: Allen: Pleaded guilty Boatwright, Newsome, Williams: Guilty on all counts
- Convictions: Boatwright, Newsome, Williams: Premeditated first-degree murder; Robbery with a firearm; Allen: Second-degree murder (Note: Allen's charge of premeditated first-degree murder was dropped in a plea deal.); Robbery with a firearm
- Sentence: Boatwright: Two consecutive life sentences without the possibility of parole, plus 30 years Newsome, Williams: Life imprisonment without the possibility of parole Allen: 7 years' imprisonment (reduced to 5 1/3 years) plus 20 years' probation
- Judge: Michael Usan

On June 18, 2018, 20-year-old American rapper and singer-songwriter Jahseh Dwayne Ricardo Onfroy, known professionally as XXXTentacion, was murdered in Deerfield Beach, Florida. Onfroy was fatally shot by 22-year-old Michael Boatwright after being robbed in his car by Boatwright and his accomplices Trayvon Newsome, Dedrick Williams, and Robert Allen outside RIVA Motorsports, an upscale dealership of motorcycles and watercraft in Deerfield Beach. Authorities charged the four men with first-degree murder and robbery with a firearm.

On August 12, 2022, Robert Allen pleaded guilty to robbery with a firearm and to the lesser conviction of second-degree murder in a plea deal in exchange for his testimony against the others.

Boatwright, Newsome, and Williams were convicted of first-degree murder and robbery with a firearm at their trial on March 20, 2023. On April 6, 2023, Newsome and Williams were sentenced to life imprisonment without the possibility of parole; Boatwright received two consecutive life sentences without the possibility of parole, plus another consecutive 30 years in prison.

On May 17, 2023, Robert Allen was sentenced to seven years in prison with credit for time served, plus 20 years' probation after he is released. He was released early from prison on October 26, 2023.

== Murder ==
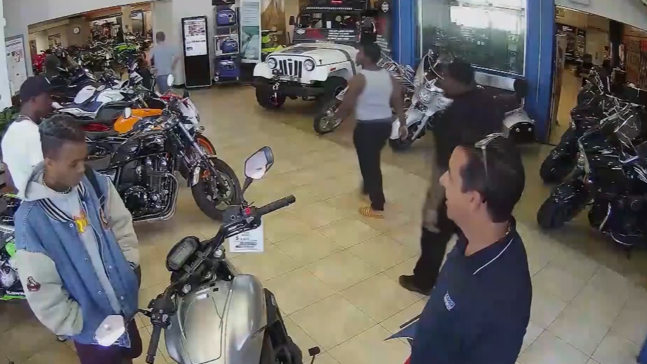
Dedrick Williams and Robert Allen monitoring Onfroy (left, foreground) in a motorcycle dealership, minutes before the murder

On June 18, 2018, Onfroy went to Bank of America to withdraw money before heading to RIVA Motorsports, an upscale seller of motorcycles and boats in Deerfield Beach, Florida. After withdrawing money, he was followed by a dark-colored Dodge Journey SUV containing Dedrick Williams, Robert Allen, Michael Boatwright, and Trayvon Newsome.

The murder was premeditated. Investigators determined Williams had been in a probation office at the same time as Onfroy in January 2018, and recognized Onfroy's car the day of the murder, which Robert Allen confirmed in a police interview. As the perpetrators were driving in the rental Dodge Journey, Williams spotted Onfroy's car in the RIVA Motorsports parking lot and told the other perpetrators that they should go into the dealership to confirm that it was actually Onfroy.

At 3:30 p.m. EDT, Onfroy arrived at RIVA Motorsports and entered with his step-uncle, Leonard Kerr. Security camera footage showed that Robert Allen and Dedrick Williams then followed Onfroy inside the store, and walked right past Onfroy as he was browsing motorcycles. They are recorded coming into RIVA and buying two black masks.

Nearly half an hour later, Onfroy left the dealership, entered his black BMW i8 and began to drive away from the dealership. The SUV drove in front of Onfroy's car, blocking his only exit from the dealership, while Newsome and Boatwright exited the vehicle and demanded property from Onfroy with firearms in hand. A brief struggle ensued, in which Boatwright and Newsome punched Onfroy several times, and Newsome began demanding Onfroy's chain. Amid the struggle, Onfroy's step-uncle fled the car, leaving the door open. The struggle continued with Onfroy being in a state of confusion, yelling, "What is this for?" After failing to retrieve the chain from Onfroy's neck, Newsome then ran to get into Onfroy's car on the passenger side, where the door was left open. Newsome entered the passenger side of the vehicle and stole Onfroy's Louis Vuitton bag, containing $50,000, and ran back to the Dodge Journey. Despite the robbery being over, Boatwright walked back one or two feet away from Onfroy's vehicle, held his rifle, looked Onfroy in the eyes, and fired multiple shots, killing him.

The perpetrators then fled the scene in the Dodge Journey. Accomplice Robert Allen stated at the other three perpetrators' trial that after the murder, Newsome asked Boatwright why he shot Onfroy, with Boatwright responding that he tried to grab his gun, though Boatwright's alleged claim was never supported, and at the perpetrators' trial it was confirmed that Onfroy had not provoked any of the perpetrators. Onfroy was later pronounced dead at 4:51 p.m. EDT that day. According to his autopsy, Onfroy was shot three times. Two of the bullets entered his neck at a downward angle and reached inside his chest cavity. These bullets clipped the upper lobe of his left lung, and grazed his aorta. Onfroy tested negative for any drugs or alcohol in the toxicology report.

The shooting occurred east of the city of Parkland, where Onfroy was living at the time. The Broward County Fire Department rushed him to the nearby Broward Health North. Paramedics were able to briefly revive a pulse, but it was never regained. Onfroy was initially reported to be in critical condition following the shooting, but the Broward County Sheriff's Office later confirmed his death.

== Arrests ==
Police investigating near Onfroy's car after the attack

Shortly following the announcement of Onfroy's death, the Broward County Sheriff's Office offered a $3,000 bounty for any information leading to the arrest of any suspects.

On June 20, 2018, two days after the murder, the Broward County Sheriff's Office arrested 22-year-old Dedrick Devonshay Williams in connection with Onfroy's murder. Williams was driving in his silver 2004 Honda before a traffic stop occurred. Williams was detained in the car chase that followed. Williams was identified by clothing he wore on June 18, which included orange sandals and a white tank top. The police matched images from security footage to recent pictures from Williams' Instagram feed, which featured "the same or similar bright orange sandals". He was also identified by employees who said they saw him enter RIVA Motorsports to buy a neoprene mask. After Williams' arrest, two more active warrants were issued.

On June 27, 22-year-old Robert Allen was named as a person of interest in the case and was later arrested on July 26.

On July 5, 22-year-old Michael Boatwright was arrested by the Broward County Sheriff's Office on drug-related charges, but on July 10, Boatwright was visited by detectives while in jail and was presented with his arrest warrant for premeditated first-degree murder. Boatwright had searched for "accessory to murder" and "XXXTENTACION" on his phone's web browser after the murder. The former search term was later revealed by Allen to be because Boatwright was incorrectly reassuring Allen that he could only be charged with accessory to murder since Allen was not the triggerman. Boatwright was determined to be the one who fatally shot Onfroy. The three men were later indicted by a grand jury, alongside a fourth, for Onfroy's murder.

On August 7, 20-year-old Trayvon Newsome was arrested.

== Legal proceedings ==
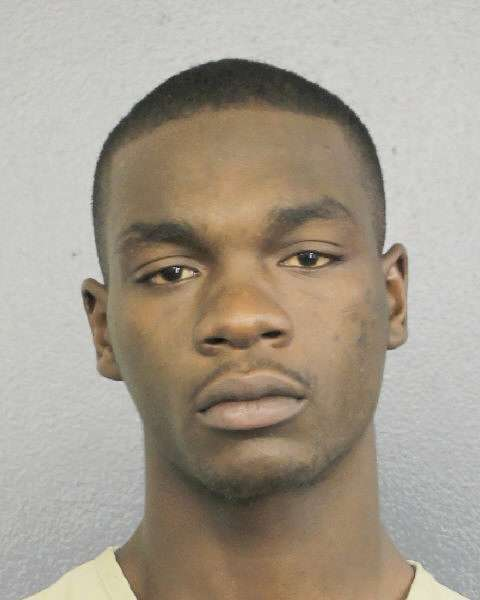
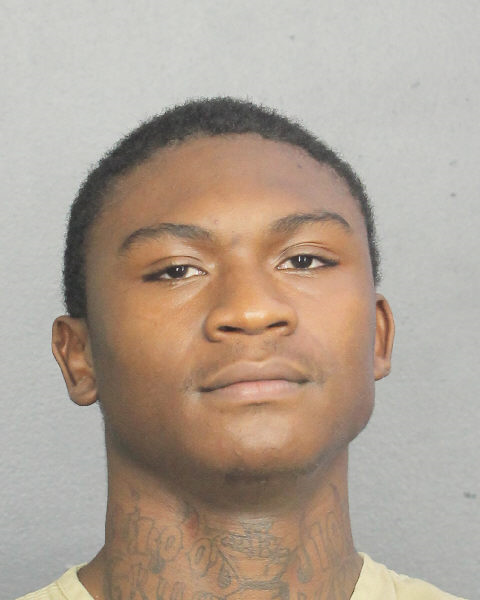
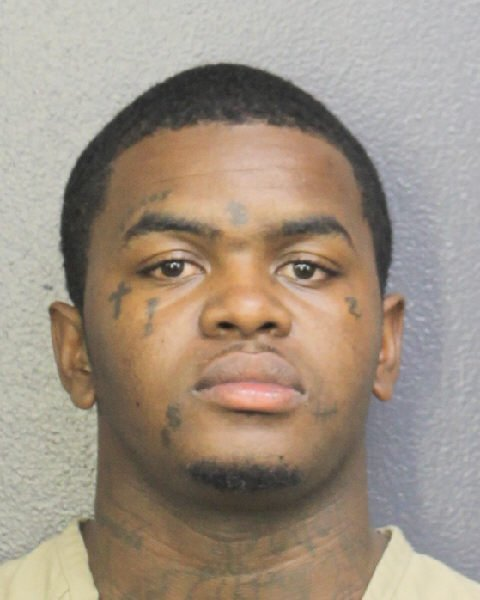
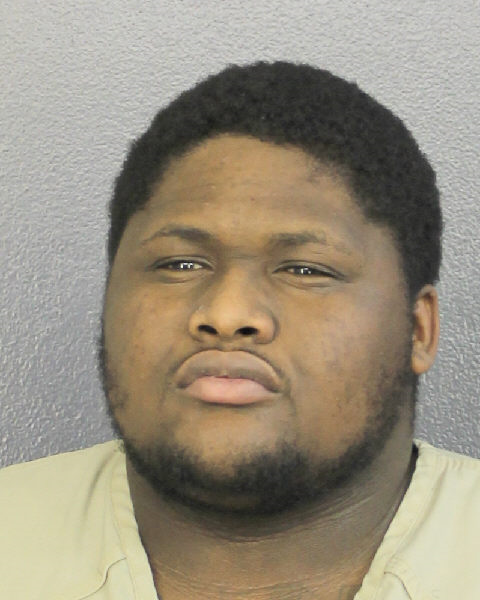
Mugshots of perpetrators Michael Boatwright (top left), Trayvon Newsome (top right), Dedrick Williams (bottom left) and Robert Allen (bottom right)

Dedrick Williams was charged with dangerous and depraved first-degree murder and probation violation and was denied bail. On June 25, he pleaded not guilty. Williams had been arrested multiple times prior.

During Williams' interrogation, he reportedly went from denying he was involved in the killing to remorse, saying it had cost him "sleepless nights" and that he did not confess earlier due to fear of being labeled a "snitch".

On July 10, Michael Boatwright was arrested and charged with premeditated first-degree murder. According to the Broward County Sheriff's Office, Boatwright was initially arrested on unrelated drug charges on July 5 before he was formally charged with Onfroy's murder on July 10.

On July 25, a third suspect, Robert Allen, 22, was taken into custody and charged with premeditated first-degree murder after U.S. Marshals found him at his sister's house in rural Georgia. He was booked in Dodge County, Georgia, and was held without bond on a warrant from the Broward County Sheriff's Office.

On August 7, the Broward County Sheriff's Office announced on Twitter that Trayvon Newsome, 20, was taken into custody shortly before 5:00 p.m. EST and had been booked on charges of premeditated first-degree murder and robbery with a deadly weapon.

Jahseh Onfroy's father, Dwayne Onfroy, had stated that he wanted the death penalty for the shooter and life imprisonment without the possibility of parole for the accomplices. Since the perpetrators were charged in Florida, if convicted of first-degree murder, they would have been eligible for capital punishment. However, the prosecution decided to seek life in prison without the possibility of parole over the death penalty.

On August 12, 2022, Robert Allen pleaded guilty to the lesser conviction of second-degree murder in exchange for testimony against the other three defendants.

In October 2022, Boatwright's attorneys began to claim that he was incompetent to stand trial and requested that psychological experts be appointed to determine Boatwright's legal competence. Boatwright was declared mentally competent to stand trial.

=== Trial ===
Trial judge Michael Usan ruled on January 17, 2023, that Onfroy's past criminal history and personal character were irrelevant to the crime and would not be permitted subjects at trial. The trial was initiated on February 7, 2023. Robert Allen had previously taken a plea deal for second-degree murder for his testimony against Boatwright, Newsome, and Williams. Boatwright's attorney claimed in his opening that the fact that Boatwright searched "accessory to murder" proved he was innocent, but this was later disproven by Allen, who said that Boatwright searched it because he misinformed Allen that Allen could only be charged with accessory rather than actual murder. A DNA analyst testified that Boatwright's DNA on the mask used in the murder was rarer than one in 929 nonillion.

On March 20, 2023, the eighth day of jury deliberations, Boatwright and his two other co-defendants were found guilty on all counts. Boatwright made headlines for the fact that he blew a kiss to XXXTentacion's family after he was found guilty, with much of the public expressing disgust for Boatwright's conduct. On April 6, 2023, his two co-defendants were sentenced to a term of life in prison without the possibility of parole, while Boatwright received two consecutive terms of life without parole, plus another consecutive 30 years. The presiding judge, Michael Usan, expressed his condemnation of Boatwright at his sentencing, stating to him,

You turned a robbery into a murder. And on that day when you stood there and fired that weapon, you didn't just end one life. You effectively ended five lives, including your own ... You will spend the rest of your life in prison. From here you will go and be placed in a cell that has a stainless steel slab attached to the wall. That's your bed. And next to it is a stainless steel sink and a stainless steel toilet. That's the furniture that you have in that cell. You'll spend every hour, and every day, and every week, and every year of your life in that cell. And one day, they'll come and open up that cell in the morning and you'll have passed on. And only on that day will you have served your sentence.

On March 20, 2023, all three defendants were found guilty on all counts. On April 6, 2023, they were all sentenced to life in prison without the possibility of parole.

== Perpetrators ==
=== Michael Boatwright ===
Michael Sherrell Boatwright was born on September 12, 1995, in Fort Lauderdale, Florida. Authorities determined that Boatwright was the one who shot XXXTentacion three times without provocation and left him to die in his car.

He attended multiple high schools, such as J. P. Taravella High School in Coral Springs and Northeast High School in Oakland Park, before being transferred to Pine Ridge Alternative Center in Fort Lauderdale, dropping out during the tenth grade.

Boatwright was arrested multiple times prior to the murder of XXXTentacion, mainly on drug charges. In 2013, he was arrested in Broward County for assault or battery on specified officials or employees. The same year, he was arrested again for selling cocaine or heroin within 1,000 feet of a school zone. For these charges, he was put on community control.

In 2015, Boatwright was arrested again for possession of cannabis and PVP, which also counted as a violation of his community control. Boatwright had already been in jail for an arrest on unrelated charges related to cocaine possession with intent to distribute before he was charged with the murder of Jahseh Onfroy.

Boatwright is affiliated with the Florida ZMF gang.

On April 6, 2023, he was sentenced to two consecutive sentences of life in prison without the possibility of parole, plus another 30 consecutive years for other charges.

In October 2024, Boatwright stated with regard to the murder of XXXTentacion, "I'm not sorry for nothing I did."

=== Trayvon Newsome ===
Trayvon Demarcus Newsome was born on May 5, 1998, in Fort Lauderdale, Florida. He was one of the two gunmen in the murder. Little is known about his personal life, but he was living with co-conspirator Robert Allen at the time of the murder.

On April 6, 2023, he was sentenced to life in prison without the possibility of parole.

=== Dedrick Williams ===
Dedrick Devonshay Williams was born on March 23, 1996, in Fort Lauderdale, Florida. He was the main orchestrator and planner in the murder of XXXTentacion.

Williams attended Stranahan High School before dropping out in the eleventh grade.

He had a significant past criminal record, including offenses such as grand theft auto, burglary, theft, and assault. He was on probation when the murder of XXXTentacion occurred. He is affiliated with the ZMF gang and was known to gang members and his friends as "Chucky".

On April 6, 2023, he was sentenced to life in prison without the possibility of parole.

=== Robert Allen ===
Robert Allen IV was born on March 27, 1996, in Fort Lauderdale, Florida. Before the murder, Allen was a convicted fraudster and had been convicted for carrying a concealed firearm and drug possession. He testified against the other three perpetrators at the 2023 trial. He was affiliated with the ZMF gang and has cooperated with authorities to solve another unrelated cold case murder related to ZMF. He was known to gang members as "Big Rob". Allen is the only perpetrator to apologize for his role in the murder, with presiding Judge Usan stating that he believed Allen, unlike the other three perpetrators, was truly remorseful. He stated at his sentencing:

"To say I'm sorry does not even begin the true inner remorse I want to make known. I know that these words that I will speak will never erase the pain and sorrow and loss of what the family will have from now on. There isn't a day that goes by that I don't think about what happened and beg for forgiveness from God. If I have to die in prison then so be it, I know the risk I was taking. Let justice be served and I'll know that was the right thing to do ... Please forgive me".

— Robert Allen

On May 17, 2023, Allen was sentenced to seven years in prison with credit for time served, plus a consecutive 20 years' probation. He was released from prison on October 26, 2023.

== Reaction ==
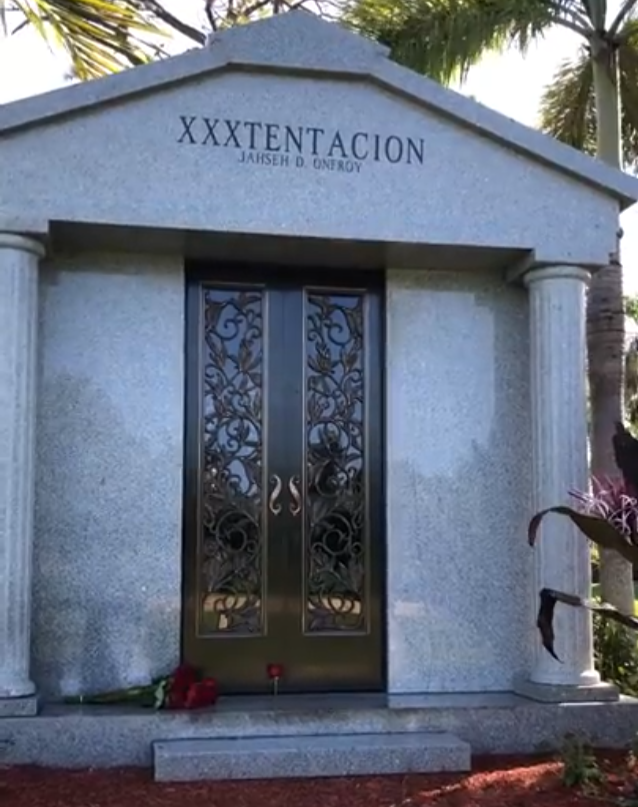
Onfroy's mausoleum at the Gardens of Boca Raton

Following the announcement of Onfroy's murder, a makeshift memorial was quickly created by fans and local residents, consisting of lyrics from the artist and words of remembrance written in chalk stretching up to a hundred yards. The owner of RIVA Motorsports, where XXXTentacion was killed, held a vigil on June 19, 2018, the day after his murder. Hundreds gathered during the vigil, and Broward County sheriffs were forced to close the street. Shortly after, a walk commenced between Onfroy's fans. Onfroy's house in Parkland, Florida, which was being built at the time, was also memorialized by fans.

Internet personality Adam22, the creator of the podcast "No Jumper", for which Onfroy had his first professional interview, held a memorial a day after Onfroy's death in front of his BMX retail store, OnSomeShit, on Melrose Avenue in Los Angeles. The crowd eventually grew to over 1,000 people and police in riot gear eventually appeared with police en route to disperse the crowd. According to reports, rubber bullets were shot and tear gas was used to disperse the crowd.

An open casket service for Onfroy took place at BB&T Center in Sunrise, Florida, on June 27, where fans were allowed to pay their respects. His private funeral took place a day later, where rappers Lil Uzi Vert & Lil Yachty and singer Erykah Badu were among the attendees. He was laid to rest in a gray mausoleum at the Gardens of Boca Raton Memorial Park, in Boca Raton, Florida.

On June 19, the day after Onfroy's death, Billboard reported that Taylor Swift's Spotify single-day streaming record for "Look What You Made Me Do" was broken by Onfroy's track "Sad!", with over 10.4 million streams compared to Swift's 10.1 million streams. This was followed by a 17-fold sales increase across all streaming and download platforms, including a 7,000-fold sales increase in CDs on Amazon.com. Onfroy's album ? was expected to return to the top five the week of his death following his murder, ultimately reaching number three with 90,000 album-equivalent units sold, up from 19,000 the last week. In the week following his murder, Onfroy's highest-charting single, "Sad!", went from 52nd to 1st on the Billboard Hot 100, making him the first artist to top the Hot 100 posthumously in a lead role since The Notorious B.I.G., with "Mo Money Mo Problems", in 1997. On June 28, his management team posthumously released the music video for "Sad!" on YouTube, which has received over 170 million views, while the audio has over 1.9 billion listens on Spotify.

On June 22, 2018, rapper Juice Wrld released two tracks, "Rich and Blind" and "Legends", as a tribute to Onfroy and other rappers. The cover art for both songs reveals an Instagram DM conversation between him and Onfroy.

Between June 18 and October 21, 2018, singer Billie Eilish and her brother Finneas wrote a song dedicated to Onfroy titled "6.18.18", which was performed by Billie Eilish during their 1 by 1 Tour.
