= List of emo rap artists =

This is a list of notable emo rap artists.

== List ==
- 24kGoldn
- Bones
- Iann Dior
- GothBoiClique
- Hobo Johnson
- Juice WRLD
- The Kid Laroi
- Lil Aaron
- Lil Bo Weep
- Lil Lotus
- Lil Peep
- Lil Skies
- Lil Tracy
- Lil Uzi Vert
- Lil Xan
- Lil Yachty
- Midwxst
- Night Lovell
- Nothing,Nowhere
- Poorstacy
- Princess Nokia
- Powfu
- Trippie Redd
- Wicca Phase Springs Eternal
- Wifisfuneral
- XXXTentacion
- Yung Lean
