= Tigers Jaw discography =

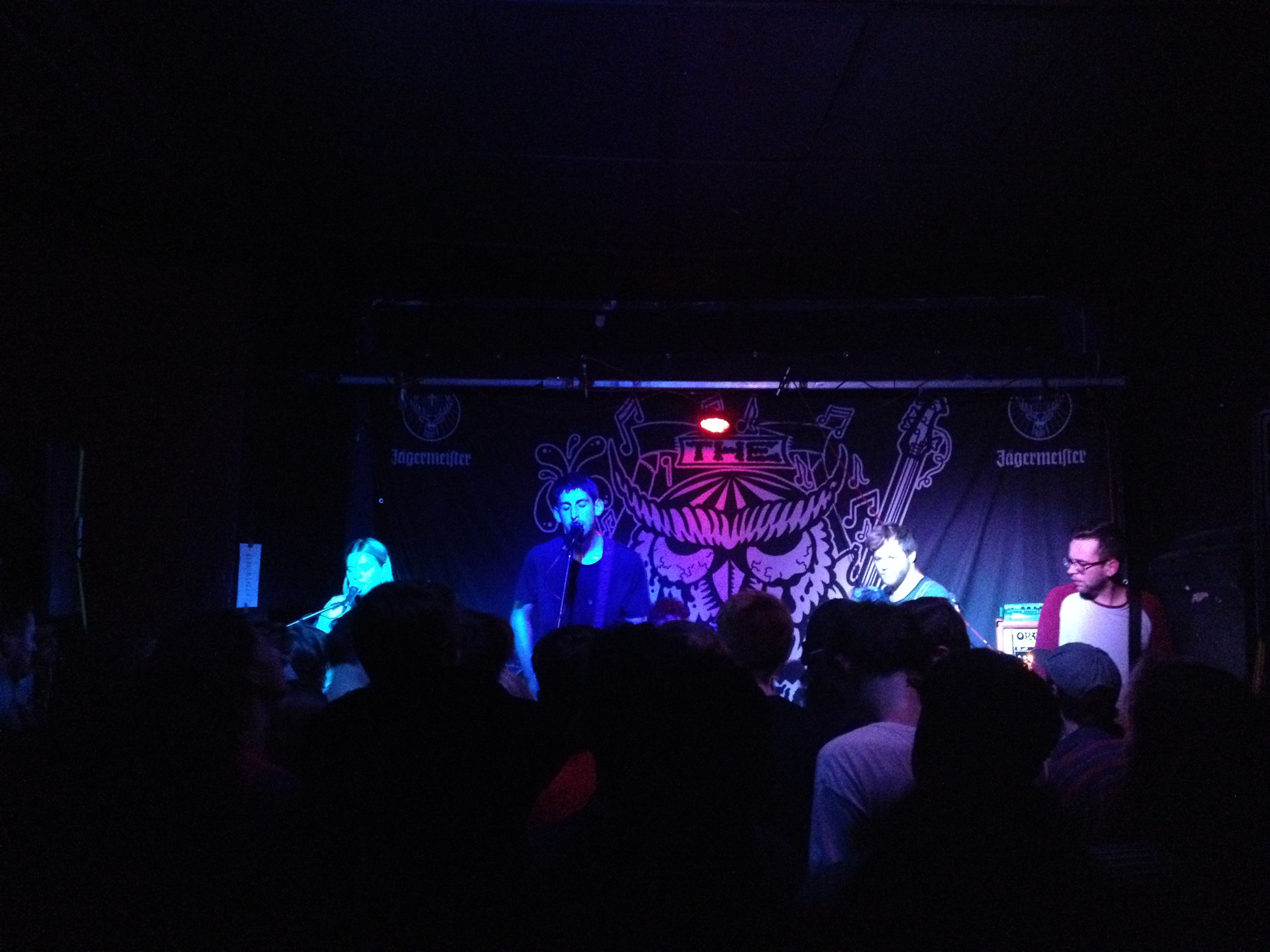
- Studio albums: 7
- EPs: 13
- Live albums: 1
- Singles: 9
- Music videos: 10

The discography of Tigers Jaw, an American rock band, consists of seven studio albums, one live album, thirteen extended plays and nine singles.

== Albums ==
=== Studio albums ===
List of studio albums, with selected chart positions
Title	Details	Peak chart positions		
Title	Details	US	US Alt	US Indie
Belongs to the Dead	Released: October 3, 2006; Label: Summersteps; Format: CD-R, DL, LP	—	—	—
Tigers Jaw	Released: September 10, 2008; Label: Prison Jazz; Format: CD, CS, DL, LP	—	—	—
Two Worlds	Released: November 23, 2010; Label: Run for Cover; Format: CD, CS, DL, LP	—	—	—
Charmer	Released: June 3, 2014; Label: Run for Cover; Format: CD, CS, DL, LP	49	11	8
Spin	Released: May 19, 2017; Label: Black Cement; Format: CD, DL, LP	—	—	—
I Won't Care How You Remember Me	Released: March 5, 2021; Label: Hopeless; Format: CD, DL, LP	55	—	—
Lost on You	Released: March 25, 2026; Label: Hopeless; Format: CD, DL, LP	TBD	TBD	TBD
"—" denotes a release that did not chart.

=== Live albums ===
List of live albums
Title	Details
Studio 4 Acoustic Session	Released: June 29, 2015; Label: Memory Music; Format: DL, LP

== Extended plays ==
List of extended plays
Title	Details
2008 Summer Tour EP	Released: 2008; Label: Prairie Queen; Format: CD-R, DL, 7" vinyl
Spirit Desire	Released: July 7, 2009; Label: Tiny Engines; Format: CS, DL, 7" vinyl
Balance and Composure / Tigers Jaw (split with Balance and Composure)	Released: May 11, 2010; Label: No Sleep/Run for Cover; Format: CD, DL, 12" vinyl
Run for Cover Acoustic Series #1	Released: 2010; Label: Run for Cover; Format: DL, 7" vinyl
Run for Cover Acoustic Series #2	Released: 2010; Label: Run for Cover; Format: DL, 7" vinyl
Subscription Single Series #3	Released: 2011; Label: Run for Cover; Format: DL, 7" vinyl
The Sidekicks / Tigers Jaw (split with the Sidekicks)	Released: 2011; Label: Shout Out Loud Prints; Format: CS, DL, 7" vinyl
Tigers Jaw / Tiny Empires (split with Tiny Empires)	Released: 2012; Label: Run for Cover; Format: DL, 7" vinyl
4-Way Split (split with The World Is..., Code Orange Kids and Self Defense Family)	Released: 2013; Label: Topshelf/Run for Cover; Format: DL, 7" vinyl
Devinyl Splits No. 3 (split with Kevin Devine)	Released: 2015; Label: Bad Timing; Format: DL, 7" vinyl
Eyes Shut	Released: October 1, 2019; Label: Self-released; Format: DL, 7" vinyl
Old Clothes	Released: October 28, 2022; Label: Hopeless; Format: DL, 7" vinyl
I Saw Water / Constant Headache (split with Joyce Manor)	Released: October 18, 2023; Label: Hopeless; Format: DL, 7" vinyl

== Singles ==
List of singles, showing associated albums
Title	Year	Album
"Hum"	2013	Non-album single
"Guardian"	2017	Spin
"June"	2017	Spin
"Escape Plan"	2017	Spin
"Warn Me"	2020	Non-album single
"Cat's Cradle"	2020	I Won't Care How You Remember Me
"Lemon Mouth"	2020	I Won't Care How You Remember Me
"Hesitation"	2021	I Won't Care How You Remember Me
"New Detroit"	2021	I Won't Care How You Remember Me
"Head is Like a Sinking Stone"	2025	Lost on You

== Other appearances ==
List of other song appearances
Title	Year	Album
"Danielson" (acoustic)	2008	Compilation Blues!
"My Friend Morrisey"	2012	Topshelf Records 2012 Digital Sampler
"Distress Signal"	2011	Mixed Signals: A Run For Cover Records Compilation
"Carry You Over"	2013	Off the Board – A Studio 4 Family Compilation

== Music videos ==
List of music videos, showing directors
Title	Year	Director(s)
"Two Worlds"	2010	
"Hum"	2014	Alex Henery
"Guardian"	2017	
"June"	2017	Ben Carey
"Escape Plan"	2017	Josh Coll & John Komar
"Window"	2018	Kris Merc
"Cat's Cradle"	2020	Lauren H. Adams & Drew Horen
"Lemon Mouth"	2020	Brianna Collins
"Hesitation"	2021	Shane Moran
"New Detroit"	2021	Kyle Barber & Dana Takacs
