= Fish Narc =

American musician and producer from Seattle

fish narc
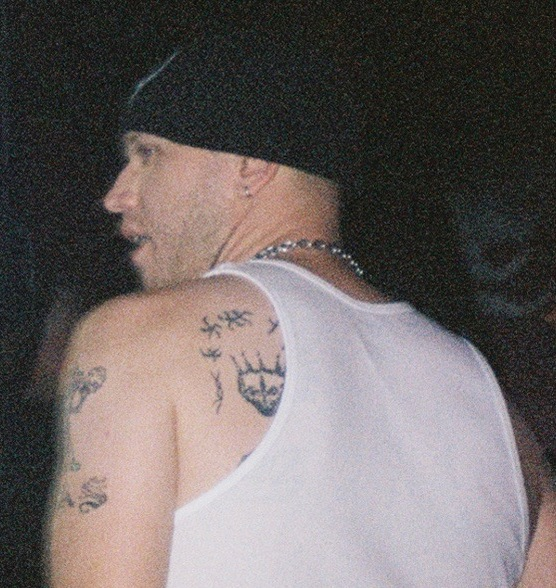
- Fish Narc photographed in Sacramento in 2023

Background information
- Also known as: Fish Narc
- Born: Benjamin Friars-Funkhouser; 1992 (age 33–34)
- Origin: Seattle, Washington, U.S.
- Genres: Emo, indie rock, post-punk, emo rap
- Years active: 2014–present

Benjamin Friars-Funkhouser (born 1992) known professionally as Fish Narc (stylized as fish narc), is an American musician and producer from Seattle, Washington. He has contributed to the development of the emo rap subgenre and as a member of underground rap collectives Thraxxhouse and GothBoiClique, producing Lil Peep’s Goth Angel Sinner LP, and collaborating with Wicca Phase Springs Eternal, Lil Tracy (Yung Bruh), Horse Head and Cold Hart. His production work is notable for use of live guitar playing instead of samples.

Since 2020, he has released solo albums Wildfire (2020), Camouflage (2022), and Fruiting Body (2023), and toured with a band.

== Early life ==
Friars-Funkhouser was born and raised around Seattle, Washington, and was introduced to music from 2000s rock FM radio. He started out as a musician while a teenager in Seattle's punk and experimental scenes of the mid-00s. He participated in the mid to late 2000s seattle DIY movement/community, attending, booking, and performing in DIY shows from 2009 to 2015 in the Pacific Northwest. His band Hausu released one album on Hardly Art in 2013 before disbanding.

== Musical eras ==
=== Thraxxhouse and GothBoiClique era ===
He picked up music software and started making industrial, noise and techno around 2014. He joined Thraxxhouse, one of several artist collectives started by former Raider Klan members, after its dissolution, in late 2014. While living in Los Angeles, California he began to collaborate with Lil Tracy, and became a member of GothBoiClique due to his background of singing in rock bands. His first production credit is "neurotic" by Yung Bruh. He then produced for dozens of artists in the underground scenes in Seattle and Los Angeles, and submitted two pseudonymous vocal tracks to GothBoiClique's 2016 album, Yeah It's True.

After Lil Peep invited him to Los Angeles to work on Come Over When You’re Sober in March 2017, he would move back to California. He lived in MacArthur Park neighborhood and collaborated with GothBoiClique members in studios in Hollywood and the San Gabriel Valley with producers Bighead, Nedarb, and others. He became one of Lil Peep’s main producers and the architect of the sound of his final project Goth Angel Sinner, with a more stripped recording style and minimal guitar beats with 808s. He also produced Horse Head's This Mess Is My Mess LP from 2017. He has several unreleased songs with Juice Wrld. In 2018, he collaborated with producer Clams Casino on an EP with Wicca Phase Springs Eternal, Spider Webs.

=== New solo music ===
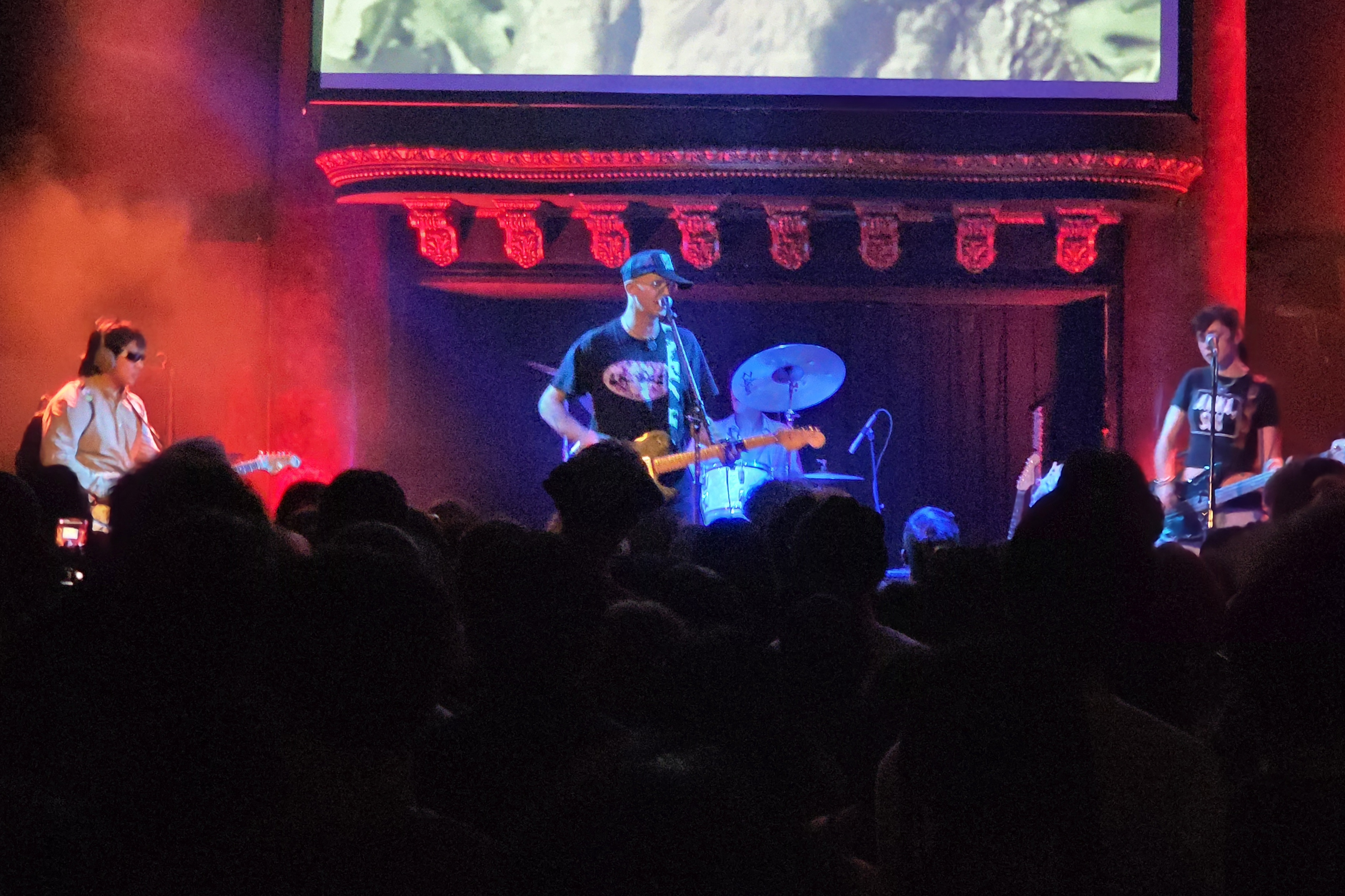
Fish Narc performing with a full band in 2025

In 2018, he moved to New York City with Yawns and Cold Hart of GothBoiClique, following Lil Tracy and Nick Blanco, setting up a studio in Brooklyn, NY and developing hybrid rock style beats that fused indie, punk, and post-punk elements with 808s and rap production techniques.

His solo music draws on punk and alternative rock, as well as his background in Soundcloud rap. His first solo album WiLDFiRE came out in July 2020.

He moved to Olympia, Washington during the pandemic. He initially self-released the album fruiting body in 2023 with the Seattle producer and artist keyblayde808, before it was picked up by K Records for vinyl and cassette. The album touches on indie and postpunk influences, combining with modern Soundcloud rap stylings.

His current songwriting is influenced by 1980s punk, with a current touring band including bass, guitar, and drums.

== Discography ==
=== Studio albums ===
==== As lead artist ====
Title	Label	Release date	Format
Wildfire	GOTHBOICLIQUE for streaming, Pop Wig for vinyl	July 17, 2020	digital, vinyl
Camouflage	GOTHBOICLIQUE	January 1, 2022	digital
Fruiting Body	self-released streaming, K Records for vinyl and cassette	June 1, 2023	digital, vinyl, cassette
Frog Song	K Records	February 14, 2025	digital, vinyl

==== With Hausu ====
Title	Label	Release date	Format
Total	Hardly Art (streaming, vinyl and CD), Bridgetown (cassette)	June 25, 2013	digital, vinyl, CD, cassette

==== With Gothboiclique ====
Title	Label	Release date	Format
Yeah It's True		June 25, 2016	

==== As executive/featured producer ====
Title	Label	Release date	Format
This Mess Is My Mess – with Horse Head		September 26, 2017	self-released
Segador de Almas – with Goa	La Vendición records	May 3, 2019	self-released

=== Mixtapes and EPs ===
==== As lead artist ====
Title	Label	Release date	Format
Foraging Wild Mushrooms	GOTHBOICLIQUE (streaming), Bratty Dog (cassette)	June 11, 2021	digital, cassette
Hunter EP	self-released	May February 16, 2023	digital

==== As executive/featured producer ====
Title	Label	Release date	Format
Night Angels – with Swan Lingo		September 21, 2018	digital
Spider Webs – with Wicca Phase Springs Eternal & Clams Casino	Dark Medicine	November 23, 2018	digital
Goth Angel Sinner – with Lil Peep	Columbia	October 31, 2019	digital, vinyl, CD as part of Everybody's Everything compilation album
