= Chris Travis =

American rapper (born 1993)

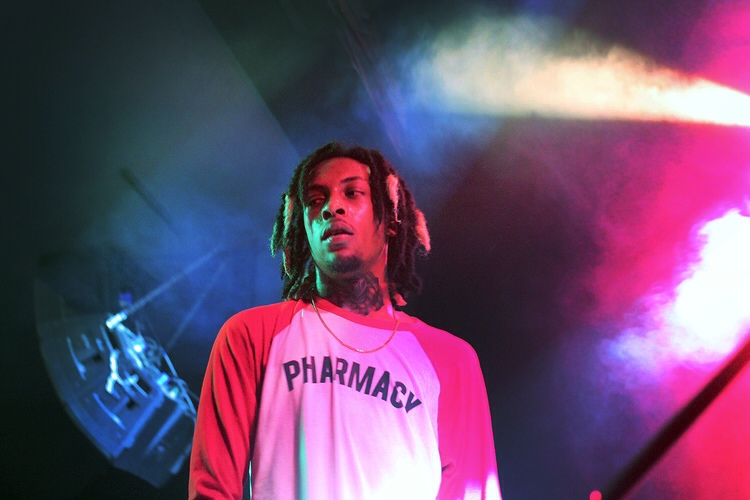
- Travis in 2018

Background information
- Also known as: Kenshin Travis; Godfather Kenshin; Underwater Kenshin
- Born: Christopher Reginald Travis; December 2, 1993 (age 32); Orange Mound, Memphis, Tennessee, U.S.
- Genres: Southern hip hop; trap; cloud rap; plugg
- Occupations: Rapper; songwriter; record producer
- Instrument: Vocals
- Years active: 2011–present
- Labels: WaterBoyzz Entertainment; Raider Klan; RBC; E1
- Formerly of: Raider Klan; Seshollowaterboyz

Christopher Reginald Travis (born December 2, 1993) is an American rapper and record producer from Orange Mound, Memphis, Tennessee. He began his career in 2012, joining the hip hop collective Raider Klan in 2013. Since then, he has formed his own independent label, Water Boyz Entertainment. He is a former member of Seshollowaterboyz, a collective with fellow American rappers Bones, Xavier Wulf and Eddy Baker.

== Discography ==
=== Studio albums ===
- The Prefix (2026)

=== Compilation albums ===
- Soundcloud V Files, Vol.1 (2018)
- Soundcloud V Files, Vol.2 (2026)

=== Extended plays ===
- Stay Pure (2013)
- After Effects (2014)
- Sea Beds (with Bones) (2014)
- Water Talk (with P2 the Gold Mask) (2014)
- No Trespassing (with Robb Banks) (2015)
- 8LVLS (2020)

=== Mixtapes ===
- Hell on Earth (2012)
- Underground Series (2012)
- Pizza And Codeine (2012)
- Side Effects (2013)
- born in the winter (2013)
- Hidden in the Mist (2013)
- Born in the Winter (2013)
- SeaBeds (2014)
- Benadryl Cookies (2014)
- Gotham City (2014)
- Never Forget (2014)
- Silence of Me Eternally (2014)
- Go Home (2014)
- Live from the East (2015)
- See You There (2015)
- Art of Destruction (2015)
- The Ruined (2016)
- Shark Boy (2016)
- Forgive Me (2017)
- WATERSZN (2017)
- Water World (2018)
- Teenage Freak Show (2019)
- Tape of Terror (2019)
- WATERSZN 2 (2020)
- Venom (2021)
- 901 Fm (2022)
- WAVS (2023)
- Water World 2 (2024)
- Heartbreak Kid (2025)
- Turnt Not Burnt (2025)

=== Compilation Mixtapes ===
- Unreleased '13 (2013)

=== Guest appearances ===
List of non-single guest appearances, with other performing artists, showing year released and album name
Title	Year	Other artist(s)	Album
"Da Block"	2012	Yung Raw, Xavier Wulf	The Trill OG
"Cali Smoke"	2012	Eddy Baker, Sky Lex	Edibles
"King of Diamonds"	2012	SpaceGhostPurrp, Dough Dough da Don, Yung Simmie, Xavier Wulf	Black Man's Wealth
"275 Be the Team"	2012	Nell	90s Mentality
"No More"	2013	Yung Simmie	Basement Musik
"Nobody Understand"	2013	Eddy Baker	Eduardo Baker
"Money on My Mental"	2013	Gangsta Boo	It's Game Involved
"Not Really Talkin'"	2013	Dxrty Rxdd	Rxdd Ranger
"Push a Mothafucka"	2013	Almighty, Xavier Wulf	Still Bumpin'
"Blvck Buddah"	2013	Key Nyata	The Shadowed Diamond
"Castle Flutes"	2013	Xavier Wulf, Bones	Caves
"Space Men"	2013	Xavier Wulf	To Be Continued
"Flex Action"	2014	Smug Mang	Planet with No Name
"I Dun Came Up"	2014	Eddy Baker	Bad Guy
"Gualla"	2014	Smug Mang, Mike Jones	Smug God
"Flex'd Out"	2014	Smug Mang, Black Kray	Smug God
"Flex Action"	2014	Smug Mang	Smug God
"Jungle Palaces"	2014	Dylan Ross	The Relic
"Slowed Killas"	2014	Smug Mang, Yung Simmie	Xans Got to Me
"All I Think About"	2014	Smug Mang	Xans Got to Me
"That Purple"	2014	Smug Mang	Xans Got to Me
"The Statement"	2014	Smug Mang	Xans Got to Me
"Searching for Service"	2014	Bones	Garbage
"Two Things"	2014	Black Dave	Stay Black 2
"Red Tide"	2014	Xavier Wulf	Blood Shore Season Two
"Deeper"	2014	Smug Mang	Smug Mang La Flare
"Flow"	2014	Smug Mang	独り善がりの
"Neoprene"	2015	Bones	Powder
"No Regrets"	2015	Kold-Blooded	Tsukuyomi
"Essence So Charmin'"	2015	Smug Mang	Lil Gwoupo
"Rumble Room"	2015	Xavier Wulf	The Local Man
"Pulled Off"	2016	Fat Nick	When the Lean Runs Out
"Water $uicide"	2016	Suicideboys	Eternal Grey
"Smoke That Sht"	2017	OmenXIII	Lifeless
"Fishscale"	2018	Kizaru	Fishscale
