= Lost on You (disambiguation) =

"Lost on You" is a 2015 song recorded by American musician LP.

Lost on You may also refer to:

- Lost on You (LP album), 2016
- Lost on You (Tigers Jaw album), 2026
- "Lost on You" (Lewis Capaldi song), 2017
