= Penn Hills Resort =

Abandoned honeymoon resort in Pennsylvania

Coordinates: 41°03′27″N 75°12′48″W

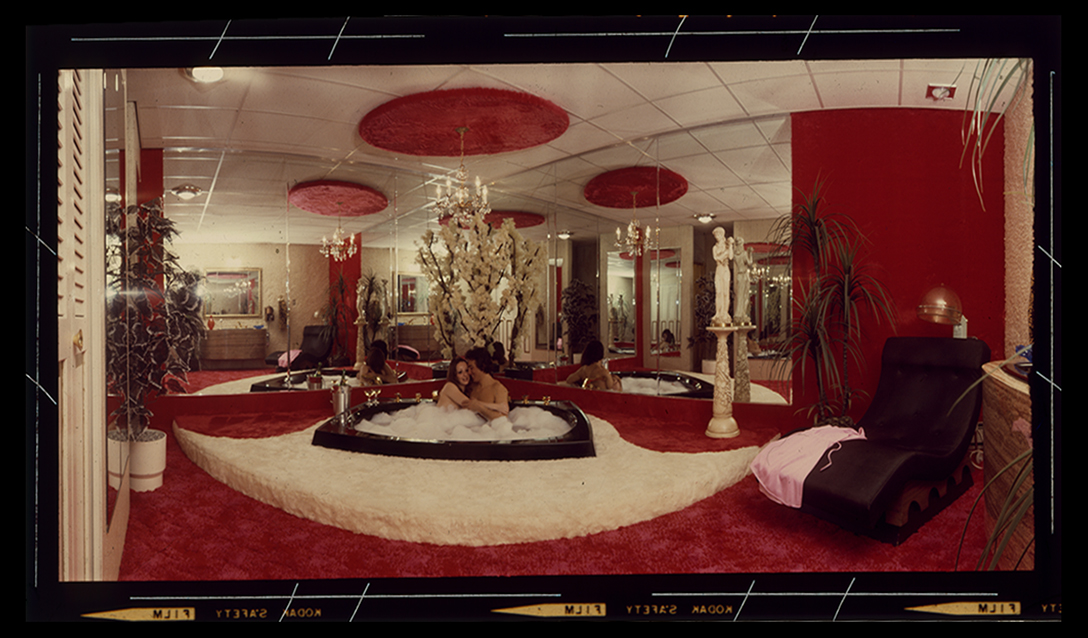
Penn Hills Resort, bubble bath, circa 1970s

Penn Hills Resort was a honeymoon resort located in Analomink, Pennsylvania, in the Pocono Mountains. Founded as a tavern in 1944, the resort grew in the 1960s, with over a hundred rooms in the hotel and a ski resort and golf course on the 500-acre site. Guest villas featured floor-to-ceiling carpeting, round beds, and heart-shaped bathtubs. Distinctive, modernist streetlights from the 1964 World's Fair were installed, as well as an ice rink and a wedding bell shaped outdoor swimming pool.

Billed as a "Paradise of Pocono Pleasure" and a place of "unbridled passion", Penn Hills catered to young couples who enjoyed archery and tennis and danced at modestly lavish New Year's Eve parties where the motto was "No balloon goes unpopped."

The resort closed in 2009. As of 2025, all of the buildings have been demolished or were destroyed by arson fire.

== Closure ==
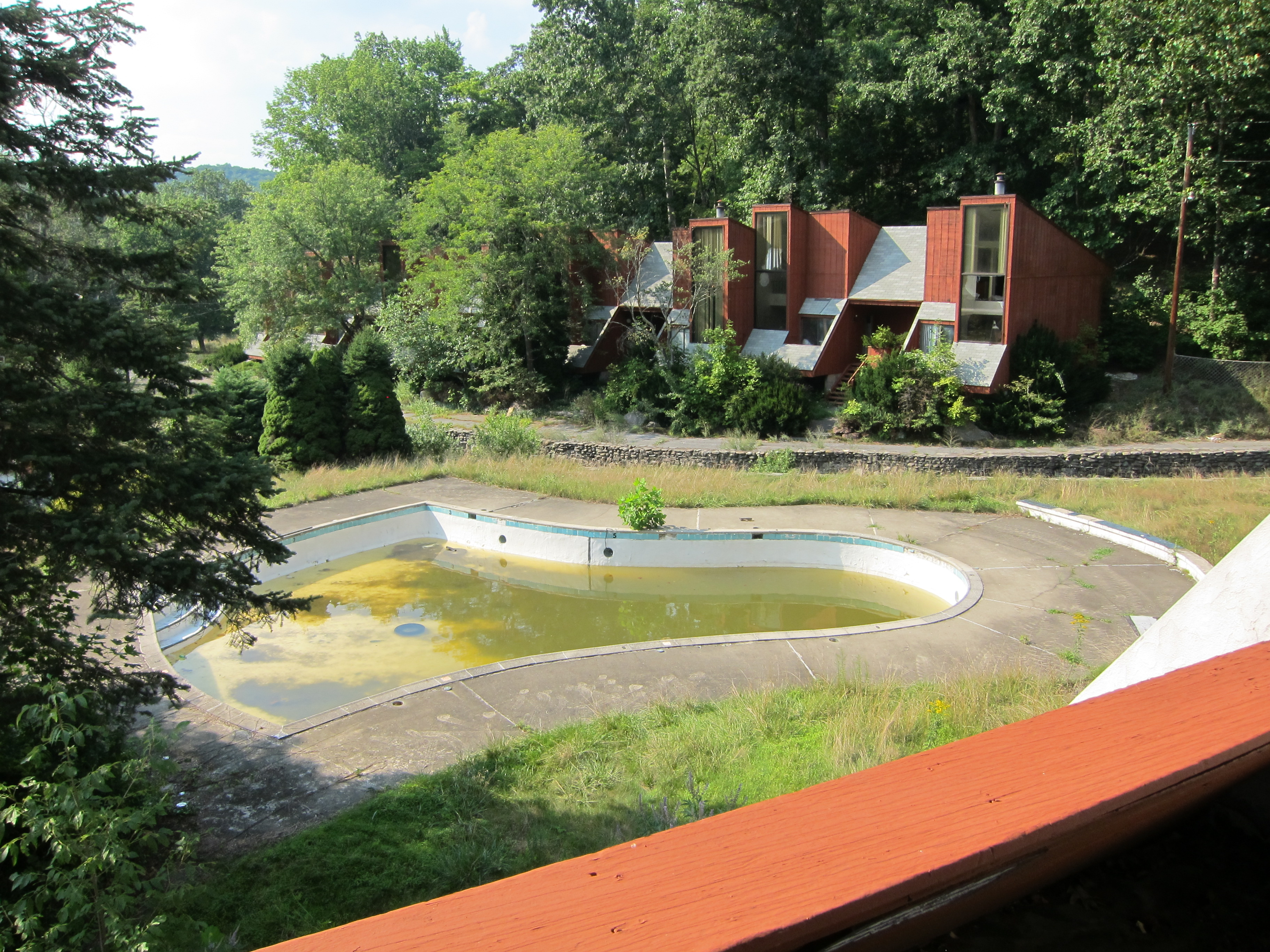
View of the Penn Hills Resort pool, shaped like a wedding bell, suffering neglect after the resort was abandoned. August, 2012

On March 4, 2009, Penn Hills co-founder Frances Paolillo died at the age of 102 and the resort closed less than two months later. Monroe County took over the property in lieu of back taxes. Workers' final paychecks were never issued, and the resort owed the county over $1 million in back taxes. Already in serious disrepair, flooding and copper thieves damaged the buildings further, and the resort was abandoned.

By 2012, Monroe County had sold several small parcels of Penn Hills. However, most of the resort remained unsold. The resort's 40-acre former golf course was purchased by Stroud Township and became the ForEvergreen Nature Preserve.

In January 2016, a group of New York investors purchased what remained of Penn Hills for $400,000. The property was sold again in mid-2017 for $688,000.

On September 4, 2017, the main building of the resort burned to the ground. This was the third time in three years that the resort had caught fire. On December 7 of the same year, the demolition of the former golf club house on the new ForEvergreen Nature Preserve began as part of the creation of the Brodhead Creek Heritage Center.

The hotel was the site of Tigers Jaw's music video for "June", from their 2017 album Spin.

A look into the hotel was last seen in February 2024 by famous TikTok urban explorer, Kayla Murphy.
