= Man Factory =

American indie rock band

- Origin: Arlington, Texas, USA
- Genres: Power pop, indie pop
- Label: Boyfriend Records
- Members: Harrison White; Austin Sevener; Andrew Ehmann; Dave King; Lane Rackets
- Past members: Toni White; Chris Tellez; Ian Smith; The Octagon

Man Factory is an American indie rock band from Arlington, Texas, established in 2002. The band has achieved regional success and is best known for its Street Fight! rock opera based on Capcom's Street Fighter video game series.

== History ==
=== Early days and Self-Titled Album ===
Man Factory was formed in late 2003 by Harrison White (guitar/vocals), Austin Sevener (guitar/vocals), Toni White (keyboard), Ian Smith (drums), and Chris Tellez (bass). The original lineup also consisted of cowbell player "The Octagon," who left the band in 2005 to release a string of successful all-cowbell solo albums ("the game has changed", "last man bellin'", etc.). Man Factory's first official performance was with Seattle, Washington-based emo rap act Sensitivity Boosters, and Lo-Tek in Austin, Texas on Saturday, August 7, 2004.

=== Happy Chanukah (Demos) ===
Throughout 2004 and 2005 the band released a series of demos through its website.

=== Boyfriend Split EP Release/Tour ===
In late 2005 Man Factory signed a contract with independent Boyfriend Records to produce a split EP with Seattle, Washington-based Sensitivity Boosters. The EP was released in the US on May 2, 2006, and was supported by a US tour featuring both acts, and was released in Japan on August 1, 2006.

=== Street Fight! Round 1 ===
On December 7, 2007, Man Factory released Street Fight! Round 1 for free download through its MySpace page, and later through their bandcamp page. The album was brought up as a joke, but became successful with two more installments.

=== Album Delays, New Lineup, and Street Fight! Round 2 ===
In a June 2008 interview with the Dallas Observer, Man Factory confirmed that work was underway on the Street Fight! Round 2 album, the Rock Opera would consist of three installments, and fans could expect the release of Round 2 in a couple months. However, Toni White's departure from the band and indefinite Street Fight! Round 2 release delays fueled speculation and rumors that the group would soon disband. On October 24, 2009, Man Factory performed songs from Street Fight! Round 2 on 88.7 FM KTCU's Good Show. In December 2009 after a long live performance hiatus, the band re-emerged with a new lineup consisting of Andrew Ehmann (drums), Dave King (bass), and Lane Rackets (keyboard).

On March 2, 2010, Man Factory released Street Fight! Round 2, which, like the Round 1, is available for free streaming through their bandcamp page.

=== Street Fight! Round 3 ===
On December 27, 2013, Man Factory released Street Fight! Round 3 which is available for free streaming through their bandcamp page. Round 3 concludes the Street Fighter Rock Opera in the most bodacious way possible.

Upon the momentous completion of the project, Man Factory received coverage from Nintendo Life, Game Informer, Joystiq, and Polygon among others.

== Current members ==
- Harrison White (Guitar/Vocals)
- Austin Sevener (Guitar/Vocals)
- Dave King (Bass)
- Andrew Ehmann (Drums)
- Lane Rackets (Keyboard)

== Former members ==
- Toni White (Keyboard)
- Ian Smith (Drums)
- Chris Tellez (Bass)
- The Octagon (Cowbell)

== Discography ==
- Man Factory [self-titled] (2003, Self-Released)
- Happy Chanukah (2004, Self-Released)
- Boyfriend Split [Man Factory/Sensitivity Boosters] (2006, Boyfriend Records)
- Street Fight! Round 1 (2007, Self-Released)
- Street Fight! Round 2 (2010, Self-Released)
- Street Fight! Round 3 (2013, Self-Released)
