= OmenXIII =

- Born: Toryan Sanders; February 17, 1995 (age 31); Ohio, United States
- Origin: Los Angeles, California
- Genres: Emo rap; dark trap; trap metal; underground rap
- Occupations: Rapper; singer; songwriter
- Years active: 2015–present
- Label: Sumerian
- Website: www.omenxiii.net

OmenXIII (born February 17, 1995) is an American rapper and singer-songwriter based in Los Angeles.

He began releasing music in 2015, and signed with Sumerian Records in 2022. He states that Bones is one of his primary inspirations. He has collaborated with various artists including on an EP with Eddy Baker and the singles "Poltergeist" with Corpse Husband and "Lovesick" with AlienBlaze.

He remains relatively anonymous, having not released his real name to the public until recently.

== Discography ==
=== Albums ===
- Nihil (2016)
- Lifeless (2017)
- Grim (2017)
- Decode (2017)
- Misfit (2017)
- Moonlight (2017)
- Corrupted (2017)
- Underworld (2018)
- Hacker (2018)
- Product of My Environment (2019)
- Project: Webweaver (2020)
- Bad Boy (2020)
- Sorry, (2023)
- Behind Closed Doors (2024)

=== EPs ===
- in the bedroom, i confess (with Lil Peep, 2015)
- Superhot (with Eddy Baker, 2018)
- -13 Book II: Shadowbringers (with Kold-Blooded, 2021)
- Sleepy Hollow (with Lil Annex, 2021)
