= Xavier Wulf =

American rapper (born 1992)

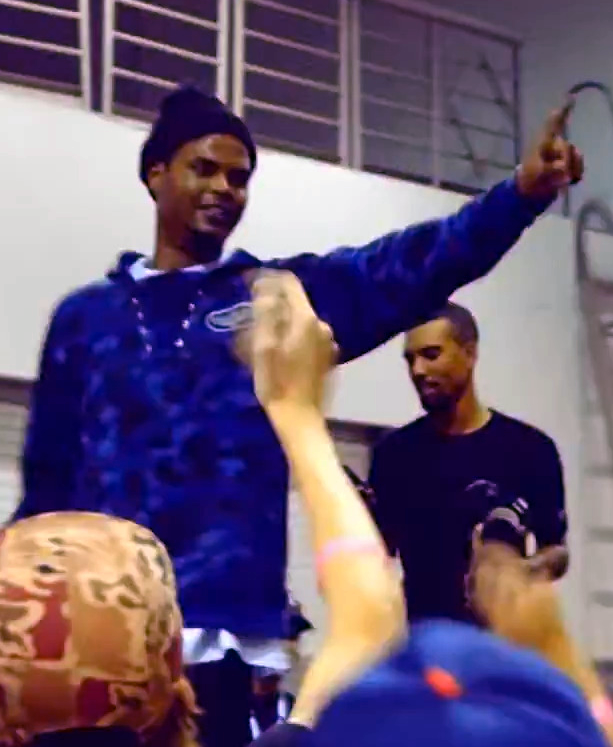
- Xavier Wulf performing in 2016

Background information
- Also known as: Xavier Wulf; Ethelwulf
- Born: Xavier Andrew Beard; October 24, 1992 (age 34); Memphis, Tennessee, U.S.
- Genres: Southern hip hop; cloud rap; emo rap; dark trap
- Occupations: Rapper; songwriter
- Instrument: Vocals
- Years active: 2011–present
- Formerly of: Raider Klan; Seshollowaterboyz
- Website: xavierwulfmusic.com

Xavier Andrew Beard (born October 24, 1992), known professionally as Xavier Wulf and formerly Ethelwulf, is an American rapper from Memphis, Tennessee.

== Career ==
Beard joined the musical collective Raider Klan in 2012 and initially released music under the name Ethelwulf, and released his debut mixtape, "The Wolf Gang’s Rodolphe" under the name Ethelwulf the same year. In 2013, he left Raider Klan and changed his stage name to Xavier Wulf. He released his first full-length album in 2015, titled Project X.

In 2020, Beard released a collaborative album, BRACE, with Bones, followed by Bennington Forest with idontknowjeffery, a fellow rapper from Memphis. He was also featured on Denzel Curry's mixtape 13lood 1n + 13lood Out Mixx that year. He also recorded the song "Don't Touch the Remote" with producer Marcelo for the TV channel Adult Swim in 2020.

In October 2022, Beard's song "Psycho Pass" from his 2014 mixtape Blood Shore Season 2 was certified gold by the Recording Industry Association of America.

In 2023, Beard announced he would be part of the InLovingMemory Tour alongside Bones and Eddy Baker, Drew the Architect, Cat Soup, and Deergod.

== Early life ==
Beard was born on October 24, 1992, in Memphis, Tennessee.

== Legal issues ==
=== Domestic abuse allegations ===
On March 12, 2024, Beard's former girlfriend of five years took to the subreddit r/TeamSESH on Reddit to accuse him of sexual assault, animal abuse and domestic violence. Beard's ex, going by "Gianyasami" on the platform, claimed that the two of them had a serious relationship for five years starting in September 2018, which took a turn for the worse in December 2018. One of his former friends and designers, going by the username "Anglicfilths", later came forward to back up her claims. As a result of this he was removed from many concert rosters.

== Discography ==
=== Albums ===
- Project X (2015)
- East Memphis Maniac (2018)
- BRACE (with Bones, 2020)
- Bennington Forest (with idontknowjeffery, 2020)
- RUDE DOG (with Quintin Lamb, 2020)

=== Mixtapes ===
- The Wolf Gang’s Rodolphe (as Ethelwulf, 2013)
- ダサい (Lame) (with Bones, 2013)
- Blood Shore Season 1 (2014)
- Blood Shore Season 2 (2014)
- Tundra Boy Season 1 (2015)
- The Local Man (2015)
- Tundra Boy Season 2 (2016)
- Blood Shore Season 3 (2022)
- Memphis Zoo (with Juicy J, 2024)

=== Compilations ===
- Greatest Hits, Pt. 1 (2018)
- Greatest Hits, Pt. 2 (2018)

=== Extended plays ===
- Shut Up Be Quiet (2013)
- Sitting Wulf (2013)
- Shut Up And Listen (2013)
- To Be Continued (2013)
- Caves (with Bones, 2013)
- Rare Wulf (2014)
- Tis the Season (2018)
- BATTLE STAR X PART 1 (with Marcelo, 2019)
- GARAGE PUNK (with Quintin Lamb, 2021)
- Celsius (2023)

=== Certified singles ===
Title	Year	Certifications	Album
"Psycho Pass"	2014	RIAA: Platinum	Blood Shore Season 2
"Kid Cudi (Remix)"	2019	RIAA: Gold	Non-album single

=== Other certified songs ===
Title	Year	Certifications	Album
"Morning Dew" (with Bones)	2013	RIAA: Gold	Caves
"Thunder Man"	2014	RIAA: Gold	Blood Shore Season 2
"Hollow Be Thy Squad	2015	RIAA: Gold	Tundra Boy Season One
"Akina Speed Star"	2015	RIAA: Gold	Project X
"First Light"	2022	RIAA: Gold	Blood Shore Season 3
