= Dylan Ross (rapper) =

American rapper & producer (born 1991)

Dylan Zachariah Ross, also known as Rozz Dyliams and Disciple Zachariah, (born January 14, 1991) is an American rapper and producer who began making music in the late 2000s. He has released solo work and was once a part of the rap collective Team Sesh. His music is considered influential in the cloud rap genre. Ross' own collective, Handzum, has been active since 2013. While his main two stage names are his real name and Rozz Dyliams, Ross has also rapped under the name William White in his earliest years.

In 2015, Ross produced the song "Ghost Boy" featuring Lil Peep prior to Peep's death. In the same year, Ross wrote and recorded the song "Handzum Suicide" with Suicideboys, which went 8× platinum. In May 2022, the Peep estate released an archive featuring a statement calling Dylan Ross one of Lil Peep's favorite artists, and described Ross' music as inspiring Peep.

Ross is originally from Ohio, but moved to Seattle, Washington in 2015. Ross currently resides in Australia, where he lives and continues to make music.
