= Tigers Jaw (album) =

Studio album by Tigers Jaw
- Released: September 10, 2008
- Genre: Indie rock; emo; pop punk
- Length: 30:03
- Label: Prison Jazz

Tigers Jaw chronology
Belongs to the Dead (2006)	Tigers Jaw (2008)	Two Worlds (2010)

Reissue cover

Professional ratings
Review scores
Source	Rating
AbsolutePunk	83%
Punknews.org	3.5/5 stars

Tigers Jaw is the second full-length by American emo band Tigers Jaw. It was released on September 10, 2008, as the band's first album to be released through Prison Jazz. It was then released on vinyl in October 2009 through Photobooth, before a reissue through Run for Cover on August 3, 2010. The songs "Heat", "Meals on Wheels" and "The Sun" are all re-recorded songs from the band's debut album Belongs to the Dead, with "Okay Paddy" having its name changed to "Meals on Wheels". It has appeared on a best-of emo album list by Junkee. Similarly, "I Saw Water" appeared on a best-of emo songs list by Vulture.

Loudwire called "Plane vs Tank vs Submarine" the best emo track of 2008. BrooklynVegan called the album a "landmark release in the early days of the emo revival".

== Style ==
According to BrooklynVegan, the album contains "punk riffs and sing-along choruses", as well as a handful of acoustic tracks. The album's lyrics explore youth, drama, and relationships.

== Track listing ==
All songs written by Tigers Jaw.

No.	Title	Lead vocals	Length
1.	"The Sun"	McIlwee	3:46
2.	"Plane vs Tank vs Submarine"	Walsh	2:02
3.	"I Saw Water"	McIlwee/Walsh	4:15
4.	"Chemicals"	McIlwee/Walsh	2:58
5.	"Between Your Band and the Other Band"	McIlwee	4:40
6.	"Heat"	Walsh	1:25
7.	"I Was Never Your Boyfriend"	McIlwee	2:47
8.	"Meals on Wheels"	McIlwee	2:29
9.	"Arms Across America"	McIlwee/Walsh	2:55
10.	"Never Saw It Coming"	Walsh	2:37
Total length:			29:54

== Personnel ==
- Adam McIlwee – guitar, vocals
- Ben Walsh – guitar, vocals
- Brianna Collins – keyboard, vocals
- Dennis Mishko – bass
- Pat Brier – drums
