= SneakGuapo =

American rapper

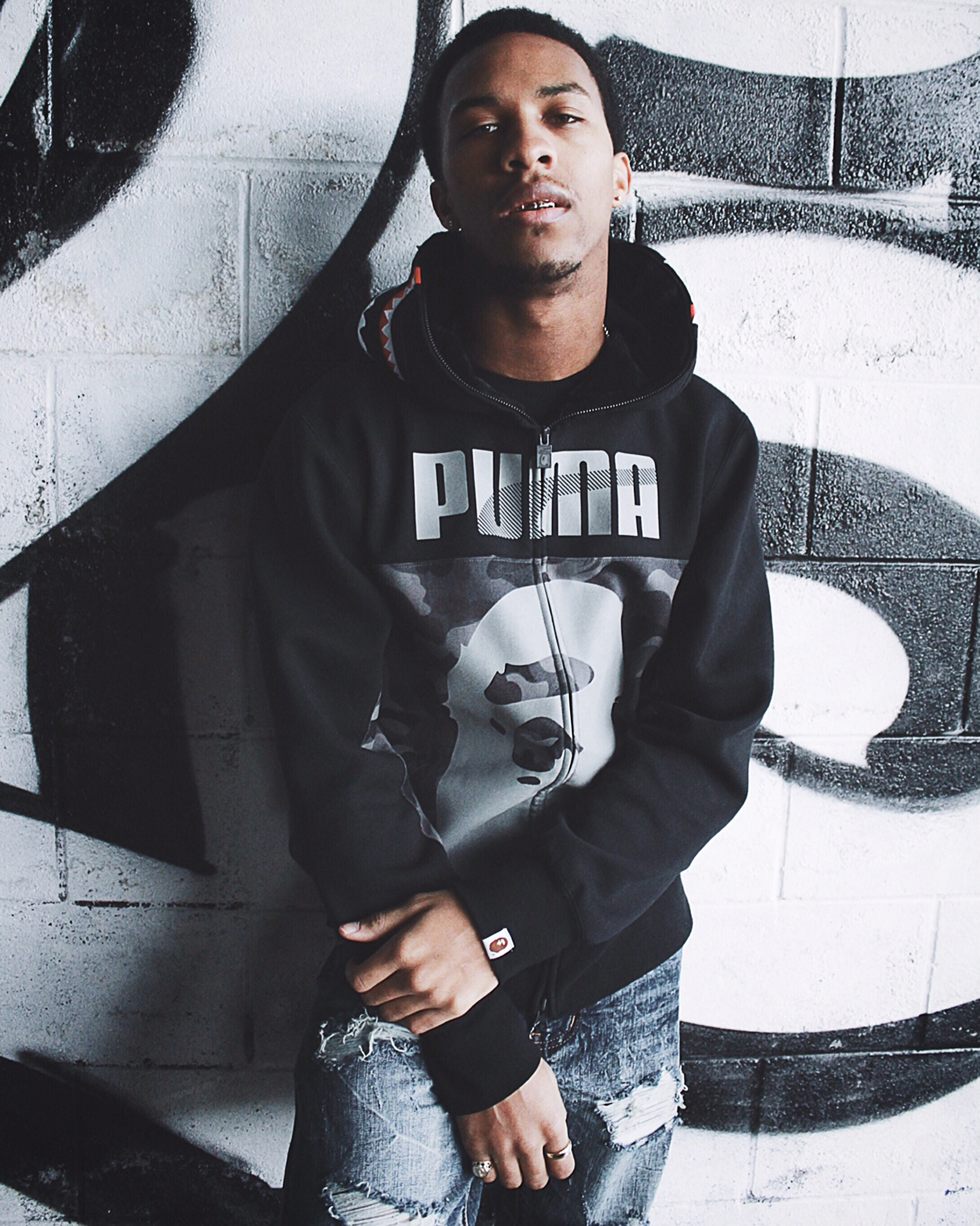

Background information
- Born: George Edwards; Seattle, Washington, United States
- Origin: Seattle, Washington, United States
- Years active: 2013–present

George Edwards, known by his stage name sneakguapo, is an American rapper born and raised in Seattle, Washington. He is a member of the Moor Gang rap collective. He was also a part of the Thraxxhouse rap collective.

== Career ==
sneakguapo released his debut album Suicide Capitol on August 2, 2013. He released the album Light-House on Jupiter on April 7, 2014, which received a positive review from Seattle Weekly. In September 2015, his EP Konica was debuted by Pigeons & Planes. After debuting the single "AYEEEE", Noisey/Vice then debuted the mixtape Glass House on December 17, 2015. His video Bust Down was debuted by Fact Magazine in October 2015. His single Put Me On was debuted by Dirty Glove Bastard in April 2016.

sneakguapo performed his first headline in Seattle, Washington on March 4, 2017 in of his highly anticipated album, "GuapSeason" that was released on June 15 on all major streaming platforms.

Sneakguapo has been main support for Lil Skies, Wifisfuneral, and Chxpo in 2018.

== Discography ==
=== Studio albums ===
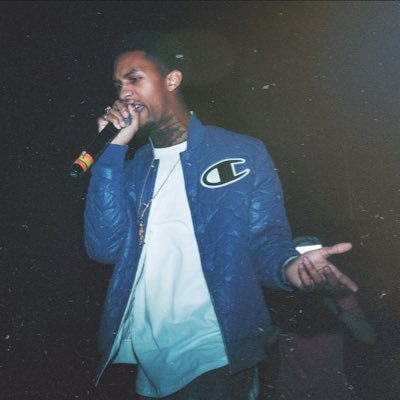
March 4th Seattle Headline Show

Suicide Capitol (2013)
Lighthouse on Jupiter (2014)
Burn Unit (2016)
GuapSeason (2017)

=== Mixtapes ===
Glass House (2015)

=== EPs ===
Konica (2015)

Oblivious Indigo Child (2017)

Sagiquarius (2017)

=== Singles ===
The Child (2013)
No Sleep (From the Streets) (2014)
Dank Sinatra (2014)
Talking to a Birdie (Mackned) (2015)
Known Assassin (2015)
Martha Stewart (Mackned & FishNarc) (2015)
Bust Down (2015)
Gold House Riot (2016)
Put Me On (2016)
Trapping Out My Mommas House (2016)
