= Spin (Tigers Jaw album) =

Studio album by Tigers Jaw
- Released: May 19, 2017
- Studio: Studio 4 Recording
- Genres: Indie rock; pop rock
- Length: 42:00
- Label: Black Cement
- Producer: Will Yip

Tigers Jaw chronology
Charmer (2014)	Spin (2017)	I Won't Care How You Remember Me (2021)

Singles from Spin
- 1. "Guardian" Released: March 23, 2017; 2. "June" Released: April 14, 2017; 3. "Escape Plan" Released: May 12, 2017

Spin (stylized in all lowercase) is the fifth studio album by American rock band Tigers Jaw. The album charted at number 13 on Billboard's Vinyl Albums chart.

== Background and recording ==
In 2013, most of Tigers Jaw's original members left the group, leaving vocalist/keyboardist Brianna Collins and vocalist/guitarist Ben Walsh as the remaining members. However, the original members returned to record Charmer in 2014, which was recorded with producer Will Yip. Spin was recorded with Yip producing and engineering at Studio 4 Recording in Conshohocken, Pennsylvania. Justin Anstoltz acted as assistant engineer; Yip and Vince Ratti mixed the recordings, before the album was mastered by Ryan Smith at Sterling Sound in New York City. Walsh said that he and Collins had discussed how to make the album and "what felt the most like Tigers Jaw ... the initial version of the band was just two people writing and recording everything". It subsequently "made the most sense" to track the album as a two-piece. Discussing his relationship with the band, Yip said Spin was the better album, compared to Charmer, "not because of my input, just because of everyone’s openness and everyone trying to do the best thing for the record". He added that his goal when making albums with the band was to become a member of the band, aiming to get the best out of the group.

== Composition ==
Spin was the first Tigers Jaw album that Collins contributed songs to. Walsh said it was "amazing" that her first load of songs "were as strong as they are", in addition to being "a lot of fun to collaborate with her on". The demos she had made consisted of a basic guitar track coupled with keyboards and vocals. According to Walsh, the pair took these "skeletons of the songs and built them up together". All of the songs on the album were credited to Walsh, except for "June" and "Same Stone", both of which were credited to Collins, Walsh, Shane Moran, and Yip. The album's sound has been described as indie rock and pop rock. Collins' friend Nicole Ashton contributed additional lyrics to "June", as did Walsh. The lyrics talk about an emotionally abusive relationship that Nikki was in. Collins said it was "really hard to see her go through [that]" so she "wanted to write a song that showed how friendship can make a difference in feeling strong enough to leave relationships that are damaging". She called Nikki an "amazing writer and the person I always go to bounce ideas off".

Walsh said "Escape Plan" was the hardest song for him to finish. He explained that the track is about "two opposing forces: the fear of being alone and fear of fully committing to someone". He said it had a "consistent upward arc, intentionally building tension and intensity to mirror the conflict in the lyrics". He mentioned that the panned acoustic guitars were done in homage to the Microphones, a band that has been cited as a massive influence to Tigers Jaw. According to the band, "Guardian" talks about the "struggle of being someone's support system while dealing with your own anxieties and issues". The song's chord progression came first, with the melody following "pretty naturally". They wanted its structure, chorus and pacing to "exist in juxtaposition of the fragile reality" of the lyrics. "Same Stone" features additional lyrics from Walsh.

== Release ==
On March 22, 2017, Spin was announced for release in May. In addition, a music video was released for "Guardian", which featured behind-the-scenes footage from the studio. The following day, the track was released as a single. On April 11, "June" was made available for streaming. Three days later, the song was released as a single. "Escape Plan" was premiered through The Fader's website on May 11. The following day, it was released as a single on May 12. Spin was released on May 19 through Atlantic Records-affiliated label Black Cement Records, which is run by Yip. The band were initially hesitant of signing with Yip's label, as Walsh explains: "When this band started and when I first started getting into music — there was a point in time when the relationships that punk bands and major labels had were just all horror stories". He added that Yip "and I have been really close friends for so long that I was like, “Well if you’re not completely turned off by this, I’m down to hear them out”". In May and June, the band went on a tour of the US with Saintseneca and Smidley.

On June 8, a music video was released for "June", directed by Ben Carey. The video features the band visiting Penn Hills Resort, located in the Pocono Mountains. However, the resort soon becomes "an abandoned, dilapidated mess of broken glass and graffiti", according to Noisey. Collins did not want the video to be an interpretation of the lyrics, instead opting for "something that was visually interesting, pretty dry, and quirky in humor" in the vein of Wes Anderson and David Lynch. Prior to performing at the Reading and Leeds Festivals in the UK, Spin received its UK release on August 18. Following this, the band went on a tour of the UK. Later that month, the band released a video for "Escape Plan", directed by Josh Coll and John Komar of Foxing. According to DIY, the video "takes a look at virtual reality and how it could change our lives". for In September and October, the band supported Manchester Orchestra on their headlining US tour, dubbed A Black Mile to the Surface Tour.

== Reception ==
Professional ratings
Aggregate scores
Source	Rating
Metacritic	69/100
Review scores
Source	Rating
Alternative Press	4/5 stars
Exclaim!	7/10
No Ripchord	5/10
Paste	Mixed
Pitchfork	7.2/10
Punknews.org	3.5/5 stars
Q	3/5 stars
Rock Sound	6/10
Stereoboard	3/5 stars
Treble	Favorable

Spin received generally favorable reviews from critics, according to review aggregation website Metacritic.

== Track listing ==
All songs written by Ben Walsh, except where noted. Additional lyrics to "June" by Nicole Ashton and Walsh, additional lyrics to "Same Stone" by Ben Walsh.

No.	Title	Writer(s)	Length
1.	"Follows"	Ben Walsh	3:46
2.	"Favorite"	Walsh	2:03
3.	"June"	Brianna Collins; Walsh; Shane Moran; Will Yip	3:23
4.	"Escape Plan"	Walsh	3:52
5.	"Blurry Vision"	Walsh	3:30
6.	"Guardian"	Walsh	4:12
7.	"Bullet"	Walsh	3:35
8.	"Brass Ring"	Collins; Walsh	3:13
9.	"Oh Time"	Walsh	2:50
10.	"Same Stone"	Collins; Walsh; Moran; Yip	3:36
11.	"Make It Up"	Walsh	3:56
12.	"Window"	Walsh	4:05
Total length:			42:08

== Personnel ==
Personnel per booklet.

Tigers Jaw

- Ben Walsh – lead and backing vocals, guitars, bass, drums
- Brianna Collins – lead and backing vocals, keyboards

Production

- Will Yip – producer, engineering, mixing
- Justin Anstoltz – assistant engineer
- Vince Ratti – mixing
- Ryan Smith – mastering

Design

- Brianna Collins – cover painting, instax photos
- Ben Walsh – instax photos
- Jimmy Fontaine – back cover photo, back of booklet photo
- Sam DeSantis – all other photos
- Matt Meiners – layout

== Charts ==
Chart (2017)	Peak position
US Vinyl Albums (Billboard)	13
