= Charmer (Tigers Jaw album) =

Studio album by Tigers Jaw
- Released: June 3, 2014
- Genre: Indie rock
- Length: 38:52
- Label: Run for Cover
- Producer: Will Yip

Tigers Jaw chronology
Two Worlds (2010)	Charmer (2014)	Studio 4 Acoustic Session (2015)

Professional ratings
Aggregate scores
Source	Rating
Metacritic	73/100
Review scores
Source	Rating
AbsolutePunk	85%
AllMusic	3/5 stars
Exclaim!	7/10
Pitchfork	7.1/10
PopMatters	8/10

Charmer is the fourth full-length by American indie rock band Tigers Jaw. It was released on June 3, 2014, on Run For Cover Records. It is their final album with the original line-up; Keyboardist Brianna Collins announced the departure of co-founding member Adam McIlwee, along with Dennis Mishko and Pat Brier from the band the previous year. Despite this, they were included in the recording of the album. In October and November 2015, the group supported New Found Glory and Yellowcard on their co-headlining US tour.

== Track listing ==
All songs written by Tigers Jaw.

No.	Title	Length
1.	"Cool"	2:35
2.	"Frame You"	2:11
3.	"Hum"	3:27
4.	"Charmer"	3:25
5.	"Nervous Kids"	2:55
6.	"I Envy Your Apathy"	3:26
7.	"Divide"	3:17
8.	"Slow Come On"	3:15
9.	"Teen Rocket"	2:51
10.	"Softspoken"	2:43
11.	"Distress Signal"	2:41
12.	"What Would You Do"	5:50
Total length:		38:52

== Personnel ==
- Pat Brier – drums, guitar, vocals
- Brianna Collins – keyboard, vocals
- Adam McIlwee – guitar, vocals
- Dennis Mishko – bass
- Ben Walsh – guitar, vocals, drums
