= Eddy Baker =

American rapper (born 1991)

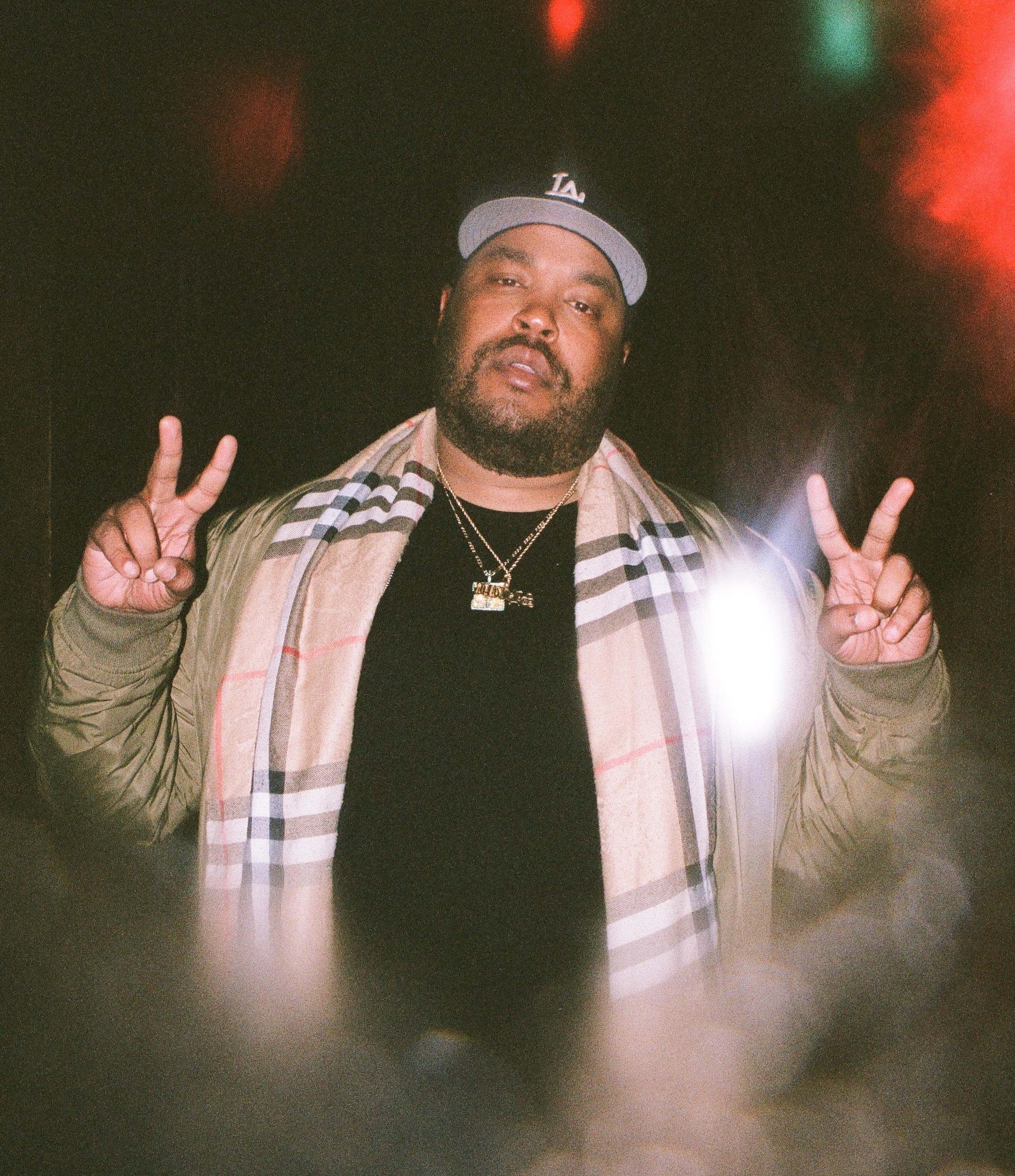
- Baker in 2020

Background information
- Born: Jamaal Ashby; August 18, 1991 (age 35); Pomona, California
- Genres: Hip hop; phonk
- Occupations: Rapper; singer; podcaster
- Years active: 2011–present
- Labels: Healthy Boyz Ent.; Seshollowaterboyz; Raider Klan (former)
- Formerly of: Raider Klan, Seshollowaterboyz

Jamaal Ashby (born August 18, 1991), known by his stage name Eddy Baker, is an American rapper, singer, and songwriter from Ontario, California. In 2011, he joined Raider Klan, the underground rap supergroup that popularized Phonk, a genre of trap inspired by 90s Memphis-rap, horrorcore, and niche internet phenomena. In 2012, Baker released Edibles, his first mixtape, under Raider Klan Records. The following year, he performed at Coachella as a part of Raider Klan. Months later, Baker left the group and started Healthy Boyz alongside rappers Chilly Sosa and Celes Karter. In 2014, Healthy Boyz joined a four-crew supergroup, Seshollowaterboyz (abbreviated as SHWB), with Bones' TeamSESH, Xavier Wulf's Hollow Squad, and Chris Travis' Water Boyz. SHWB toured and released music regularly until 2020, when COVID-19 forced a global suspension of in-person concerts and Chris Travis (along with Water Boyz, his subsidiary) parted ways with the larger group. In May 2020, Eddy Baker started Blunt Talk, a podcast with co-host Chilly Sosa about current events and spirituality.

== Discography ==
=== Mixtapes ===
- Edibles (2012)
- BADGUY (2014)
- On Call (2014)
- Growhouse (2014)
- BADGUY 2 (2014)
- Drug Dealer Music: Part One (2015)
- Most Hated (2015)
- Street Love (2015)
- BADGUY 3 (2015)
- Less Than Zero (2016)
- DRUG DEALER SUPERSTAR (2017)
- VIGILANTE (2018)
- I GOT HIGH AS F*** & FORGOT I MADE THESE SONGS (SIDE A) (2019)
- I GOT HIGH AS F*** & FORGOT I MADE THESE SONGS (SIDE B) (2019)
- The Worst of Times (EP) (2020)

=== EPs ===
- The Saul Silver EP (2012 )
- The Eduardo Baker EP (2014)
- Grey Sweatpants EP (2014)
- No Sleep (2015)
- Healthy Boy (2017)
- Hierba y Dinero (2017)
- I HOPE THIS HELPS (2019)
- NO REST FOR THE WICKED (2019)
- THE WORST OF TIMES (2020)

=== Collaborative albums ===
- Bones & Eddy Baker - SparrowsCreek (2019)
- Bones & Eddy Baker - JonesPeak (2023)

=== Collaborative EPs ===
- Eddy Baker & Celes Karter - Stepbrothers (2021)
- Eddy Baker & Yung Cortex - Ill Sleeep When Im Dead EP (2021 )
- Black Smurf & Eddy Baker - Criminal Minds (2014)
- Eddy Baker & OmenXIII - SUPERHOT (2018)
- Idontknowjeffery & Eddy Baker - Bad Boys II (2021)

=== Guest appearances ===
Title	Year	Other Artist(s)
"Bloody Trashbags"	2012	Trizz
"High"	2013	Bones
"PayPal"	2013	Bones
"Rich Porter"	2014	Chilly Sosa
"$tack Or $tarve"	2014	Black Smurf
"Scuffed"	2014	Lil Tracy
"Kale"	2015	Bones
"How We Live"	2015	Black Smurf
"Walking Royalty"	2015	Black Smurf
"We World Wide"	2015	Fat Nick
"No Fear, Part 2"	2015	Smug Mang, Xavier Wulf
"Smoked Out, Loced Out (Part II)	2015	$uicideboy$
"Smug Healthyboyz"	2016	Smug Mang
"Malace"	2016	Smug Mang
"Dark Alley"	2016	Smug Mang
"Roll It Up"	2016	Smug Mang
"Doubt Me"	2016	Lil Peep
"Golden Calf"	2016	$uicideboy$, Fat Nick
"Healthy Boy With A Snotty Nose"	2017	Chris King
"Hyer"	2017	Kold-Blooded, Ta Double Dolla
"Tie My Shoes"	2017	Lil Tracy
"Chaos Castle"	2018	Xavier Wulf, Bones, Chris Travis
"Heathen"	2018	Bones
"Rock Bottom"	2019	Idontknowjeffery
"Purple Thang"	2019	Mr. Sisco
"Look At Me Like To Flex"	2019	37 Heartbreak, Disperse
"Molly Face"	2020	Jonathan Kash
"Have No Clue"	2020	Black Smurf
"DontTellMomTheBabySittersDead"	2021	Bones
