= Tigers Jaw =

American rock band

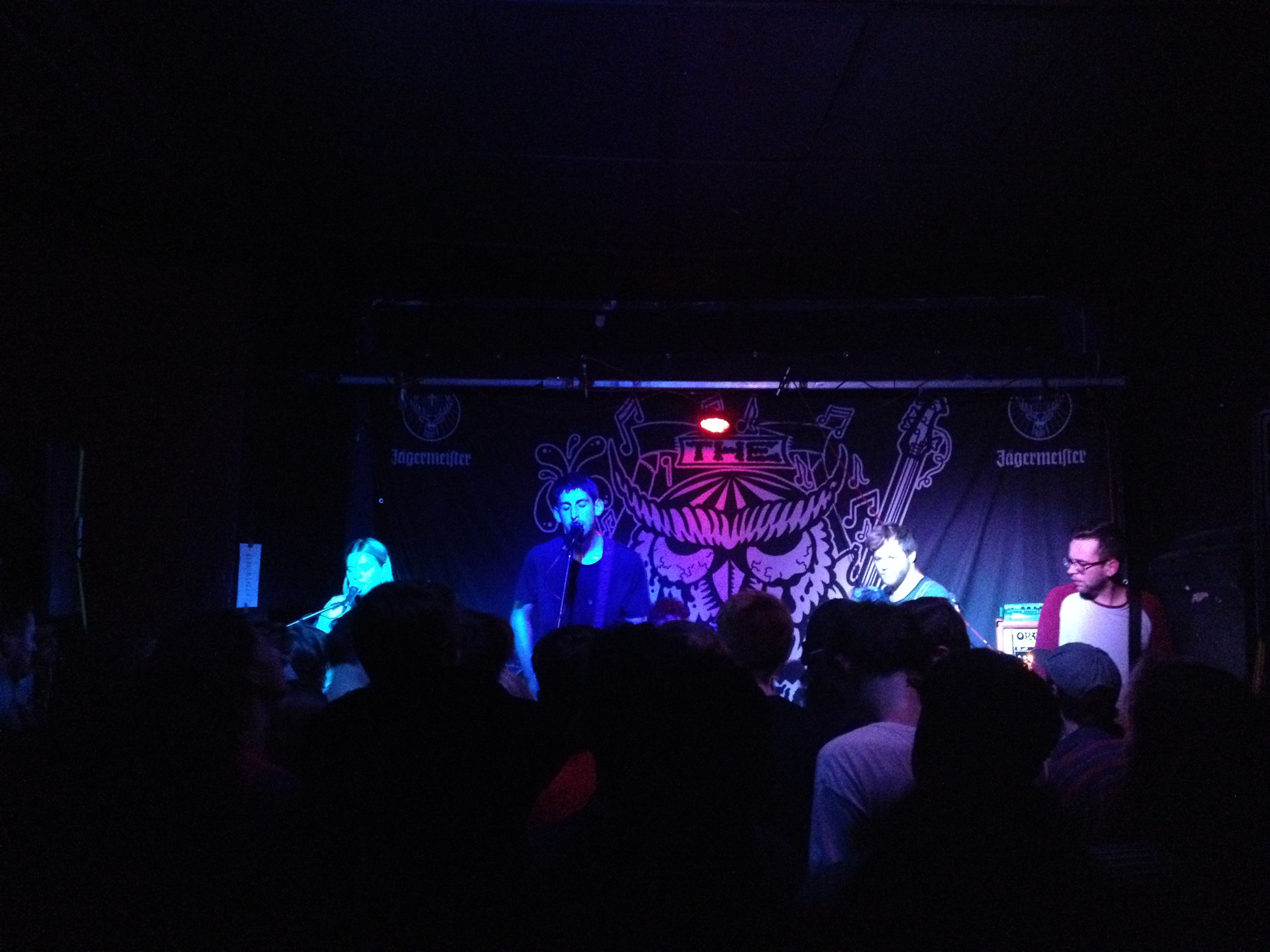
- Tigers Jaw in 2015

Background information
- Origin: Scranton, Pennsylvania, U.S.
- Genres: Indie rock; Midwest emo; pop punk
- Years active: 2005–present
- Labels: Summersteps; Prison Jazz; Photobooth; Run for Cover; No Sleep; Tiny Engines; Shout Out Loud Prints; Topshelf; Memory Music; Black Cement; Hopeless
- Members: Ben Walsh; Brianna Collins; Teddy Roberts; Colin Gorman; Mark Lebiecki
- Past members: Adam McIlwee; Mike May; Dennis Mishko; Pat Brier
- Website: tigersjaw.com

Tigers Jaw is an American rock band from Scranton, Pennsylvania, which formed in 2005. The group was co-founded by Adam McIlwee and Ben Walsh, with Walsh serving as the only consistent member throughout the band's history. Their current lineup consists of Walsh, keyboardist/vocalist Brianna Collins, drummer Teddy Roberts, bassist Colin Gorman, and guitarist Mark Lebiecki. Their first album, Belongs to the Dead, was released in 2006. They issued two more albums before announcing a hiatus in March 2013. However, their record label, Run for Cover, stated in August 2013 that the band's breakup was not official. Their fourth album, Charmer, came out in June 2014, and their fifth, Spin, in 2017. Their next album, I Won't Care How You Remember Me, was released in 2021, and Lost on You followed in March 2026.

Pitchfork has described the band's sound as possessing "the jangle of old indie rock, the stylization of new indie rock, and the simultaneously introspective and community-minded concerns of the fourth-wave emo bands for whom they're something of an authority figure."

== History ==
=== Early years and Tigers Jaw (2006–2012) ===
Ben Walsh and Adam McIlwee started the group during high school, with the former playing drums and the latter providing vocals and guitar. The band got its name from a song by lo-fi band the Microphones. Brianna Collins joined on keyboards and backing vocals after the first few months. In later interviews, the band cited Fall Out Boy and My Chemical Romance as early musical influences.

AbsolutePunk gave their self-titled album a generally positive review, noting that "Tigers Jaw is fueled by emotionally-driven lyrics brought to life by vocalist Adam McIlwee, whose voice is one of those that reveal passion while at the same time giving the impression that he's barely trying. Aforementioned opener "The Sun" is one of the better tracks on the album, offering up a well-organized mix of Tigers Jaw's two personas."

Another punk music website, Punknews.org, in their critique of the band's eponymous album, felt that the tracks "Plane vs. Tank vs. Submarine" and "Chemicals" were particularly notable for "solid guitar work in the form of weeping, goosebump-inducing solos. Strong vocal harmonies and bouncy guitar work carry both 'I Saw Water' and 'Heat' to heights other bands would have a hard time reaching." In November 2012, the group supported Title Fight on their headlining US tour.

=== Charmer (2013–2016) ===
On March 21, 2013, Tigers Jaw made an announcement on their Tumblr:

"After our show in Scranton two weeks ago, Adam, Pat, and Dennis let Ben and I know that for personal reasons they are unable to do Tigers Jaw anymore. This was a surprise for the both of us, but everyone is on good terms, and we respect and support them and their decisions.

A full band Tigers Jaw lineup (consisting of Ben and I with the help of some talented friends) will be doing a full US tour in May–June as well as the UK dates of the previously announced tour with the Menzingers in August. We regret to announce that we will have to cancel the mainland Europe dates. We apologize to the promoters, venues, and anyone who bought tickets.

These are likely to be the last Tigers Jaw tours for the foreseeable future. U.S. tour dates will be announced soon. Thanks.

- Brianna"

Many fans interpreted this announcement to mean that the band was breaking up. However, both Walsh and Collins clarified that they would continue with Tigers Jaw as a two-piece. Members of Basement filled in during their 2013 UK tour, while members of Balance and Composure filled in for the US dates. After the announcement, Brianna did an interview, where she said that "I know Ben and I really want to work on a new record, put something out. It'll happen."

After leaving Tigers Jaw, Adam McIlwee pursued his experimental solo project Wicca Phase Springs Eternal. Under this name, McIlwee blended emo and goth esthetics with cloud rap and trap, became a key member in musical groups such as THRAXXHOUSE and GothBoiClique, and famously collaborated with the late Lil Peep.

Tigers Jaw announced their next studio album, Charmer, on March 21, 2014, along with the single "Nervous Kids". Charmer reached No. 49 on the Billboard Charts. They played a U.S. tour with Touché Amoré and Dads in mid-2014.

They went on a U.S. tour with Lemuria and Somos in early 2015. In May 2015, it was announced that Tigers Jaw would be touring the U.S. with New Found Glory and Yellowcard in late 2015. In June 2015, the band played in Brazil and performed three acoustic shows in New York, Philadelphia, and Somerville. Tigers Jaw toured Australia in July 2015. In August 2015, they toured in the UK/Europe with Foxing. The band then performed various acoustic shows before undertaking another UK/Europe tour with Basement in February and March 2016.

=== spin, Eyes Shut, and I Won't Care How You Remember Me (2017–2024) ===
On March 22, 2017, spin was announced for release on May 19 through Black Cement Records, with a U.S. tour starting the same day. The album saw the release of three singles: "Guardian," "June" and "Window." In 2018, the band also performed several shows commemorating the ten-year anniversary of the band's self-titled album.

In 2019, the band released a new stand-alone single, "Eyes Shut." The track was recorded in the sessions for spin, but did not make the final cut. The single served as the title track of a new EP, which paired it with acoustic versions of "Guardian," "Follows" and "Eyes Shut." 2019 also saw the addition of touring musicians Teddy Roberts and Colin Gorman as full-time members of Tigers Jaw.

In 2020, the band released a new song entitled "Warn Me." It marked the band's first release as part of the Hopeless Records roster. Although "Warn Me" would not appear on the band's then-untitled sixth studio album, the band confirmed they had been in the studio with Will Yip working on it.

In October 2020, the band released a new track, "Cat's Cradle", serving as the official lead single to their sixth album, I Won't Care How You Remember Me. Three other singles followed from 2020 to 2021: "Lemon Mouth", "Hesitation", and "New Detroit". The album was released on March 5, 2021, along with a record release show on YouTube.

=== Lost on You (2025–present) ===
On December 3, 2025, the band issued the single "Head Is Like a Sinking Stone", ahead of their seventh studio album, Lost on You, which was released on March 27, 2026.

== Musical style ==
Tigers Jaw's style has been described as having evolved from emo and pop punk into indie rock. AllMusic has termed their lyrics as "personal and incisive" and "emotionally powerful". The band's third studio album, Two Worlds, has been described as "loud" and "neurotic", showcasing "vivacious guitar work".

Tigers Jaw have cited influences including Title Fight, Three Man Cannon, Jimmy Eat World, Saves the Day, My Chemical Romance, Fall Out Boy, Brand New, Black Sabbath, and Fleetwood Mac.

== Band members ==
Current members

- Ben Walsh – lead and backing vocals, guitar (2007–present), drums, percussion (2005–2007, 2016–2019), bass (2007, 2016–2019)
- Brianna Collins – keyboards, backing and lead vocals (2006–present)
- Theodore "Teddy" Roberts – drums, backing vocals (2019–present; touring musician 2014, 2015–2019)
- Colin Gorman – bass, guitar (2019–present; touring musician 2013, 2018–2019)
- Mark Lebiecki – guitar (2023–present; touring musician 2019–2023)

Former members

- Adam McIlwee – lead and backing vocals, guitar (2005–2013), bass (2007)
- Mike May – drums (2007)
- Dennis Mishko – bass (2007–2013)
- Pat Brier – drums (2007–2013)

Former touring musicians

- Andrew Fisher – bass (2013)
- James Fisher – drums (2013)
- Matt Warner – bass (2013)
- Bailey Van Ellis – drums (2013)
- Derrick Sherman – guitar, backing vocals (2013, 2015)
- Eliot Babin – drums (2014)
- Jake Woodruff – guitar (2014)
- Sam Lister – drums (2015)
- Pat Benson – guitar (2015–2018)
- Luke Schwartz – bass (2014–2018)
- Sam Acchione – guitar (2021)
- Jon Lebiecki – drums (2023; substitute for Theodore Roberts)

Timeline

== Discography ==
Studio albums

- Belongs to the Dead (2006)
- Tigers Jaw (2008)
- Two Worlds (2010)
- Charmer (2014)
- Spin (2017)
- I Won't Care How You Remember Me (2021)
- Lost on You (2026)
