= I Won't Care How You Remember Me =

2021 studio album by Tigers Jaw

Studio album by Tigers Jaw
- Released: March 5, 2021
- Recorded: June – August 2020
- Genre: Indie rock; emo
- Label: Hopeless
- Producer: Will Yip

Tigers Jaw chronology
Spin (2017)	I Won't Care How You Remember Me (2021)	Lost on You (2026)

Singles from I Won't Care How You Remember Me
- 1. "Cat's Cradle" Released: October 22, 2020; 2. "Lemon Mouth" Released: December 1, 2020; 3. "Hesitation" Released: January 7, 2021; 4. "New Detroit" Released: February 10, 2021

I Won't Care How You Remember Me is the sixth studio album by American rock band Tigers Jaw. The album was released on March 5, 2021 through Hopeless Records, their first with the label.

== Background and recording ==
Touring for their fifth studio album, Spin, wrapped up in mid-2018. Following the tour, both bassist/guitarist Colin Gorman and drummer Teddy Roberts were made official members of Tigers Jaw, having toured extensively with founding member Ben Walsh and keyboardist Brianna Collins in support of Spin. In early 2020, Tigers Jaw signed a record deal with Hopeless Records, and released a one-off single, "Warn Me", on June 25, 2020. During the summer of 2020, the band recorded material for the new studio album, which involved all four band members involved in the song-writing process for the first time ever.

The album was first announced on October 23, 2020, with the lead off single, "Cat's Cradle".

== Release and promotion ==
=== Music videos ===
The music video for "Cat's Cradle" came out on October 22, 2020. The music video was directed by Drew Horen and Lauren H. Adams. On December 1, 2020, the music video for the second single, "Lemon Mouth" was released, with Collins directing.

A video for "Hesitation" followed in January 2021. Former Title Fight guitarist Shane Moran directed the video, which depicts Walsh and Collins as performers in a children's magic show for a backyard birthday party. In addition to the video, several behind-the-scenes videos were shared to Hopeless Records' YouTube page documenting the creation of the video.

The band shared a video for the album's fourth single, "New Detroit," in February 2021. Kyle Barber and Dana Takacs directed the video, with Collins serving as its producer and Walsh coming up with the concept.

== Critical reception ==
Professional ratings
Aggregate scores
Source	Rating
Metacritic	76/100
Review scores
Source	Rating
DIY	3/5 stars
Exclaim!	7/10
Kerrang!	4/5 stars

I Won't Care How You Remember Me was met with "generally favorable" reviews from critics. At Metacritic, which assigns a weighted average rating out of 100 to reviews from mainstream publications, this release received an average score of 76 based on 5 reviews.

In a review for DIY, Ben Tipple wrote: "Their sixth studio album sees Tigers Jaw return to a full band aesthetic, one that fully swaps the urgency of their early material for a more considered power pop back-and-forth between its principal vocalists. That Tigers Jaw have evolved beyond the band they once were is obvious, and rightly so. The confidence and togetherness on display outweighs that of its predecessor, and early adopters will already have welcomed the band’s shifting direction or moved on." Adam Feibel of Exclaim! said: "Six albums in and two albums removed from their big member shakeup, it's fair to say that we know what Tigers Jaw are all about and what to expect from them." At Kerrang!, Jake Richardson gave a four out of five review, saying: "Their latest, I Won’t Care How You Remember Me, is another strong addition to their repertoire, and an album which sees the quartet effortlessly blending scrappy punk with a more chilled-out, easy-on-the-ear indie-rock vibe."

== Track listing ==
No.	Title	Length
1.	"I Won't Care How You Remember Me"	3:37
2.	"Cat's Cradle"	2:36
3.	"Hesitation"	2:44
4.	"New Detroit"	2:45
5.	"Can't Wait Forever"	2:37
6.	"Lemon Mouth"	3:09
7.	"Body Language"	3:37
8.	"Commit"	2:34
9.	"Never Wanted To"	3:16
10.	"Heaven Apart"	3:42
11.	"Anniversary"	3:41

== Personnel ==
Adapted from Discogs.

Tigers Jaw

- Brianna Collins – vocals, keyboards, photography, layout
- Colin Gorman − bass guitar, rhythm guitar, lead guitar on "Lemon Mouth"
- Theodore Roberts − drums
- Ben Walsh − vocals, lead guitar, bass on "Lemon Mouth"

Additional personnel

- Andy Hull – backing vocals on "I Won't Care How You Remember Me"
- Kris Hermann – additional photography
- Ryan Smith – mastering
- Will Yip – production, engineering, mixing

== Charts ==
Chart performance for I Won't Care How You Remember Me
Chart (2021)	Peak position
UK Independent Albums (OCC)	31
US Billboard 200	55
US Top Album Sales (Billboard)	55
