= GothBoiClique =

American hip hop collective

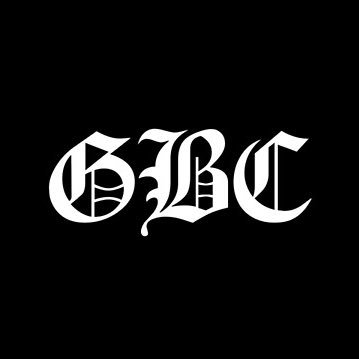

Background information
- Also known as: GBC
- Origin: Los Angeles, California, U.S.
- Genre: Emo rap
- Years active: 2012–present
- Members: Cold Hart; Døves; Fish Narc; Horse Head; JPDreamthug; Lil Tracy; Mackned; Wicca Phase Springs Eternal; Yawns
- Past members: Lil Peep
- Website: soundcloud.com/gothboiclique

GothBoiClique (also abbreviated as GBC) is an American emo rap collective based in Los Angeles, California. It was formed in 2013 by Wicca Phase Springs Eternal, Cold Hart, Ghoste and Horse Head. The group's name comes from a beat that Cold Hart sent to Wicca Phase Springs Eternal. In 2016, the group released their first mixtape, Yeah It's True.

== History ==
GBC was formed in 2012 through Wicca Phase Springs Eternal (WPSE) attempting to put together a group through Tumblr with the intention of forming a collective of musicians who could mutually collaborate with and produce for one another and draw connections between the emo, trap, dark wave, black metal and indie rock scenes. The founding line-up consisted of Wicca Phase, Cold Hart, Ghoste and Horse Head, taking their name from a beat titled "Gothboiclique" that Cold Hart had produced, which when WPSE read the name he jokingly tweeted "RT if you're goth boi clique". The members of the group continued mostly independently for the next two years, despite continuing to recruit newer artists. In 2014, the members met each other in person, and soon after GBC became a sub-group of the newly-founded hip hop collective Thraxxhouse, a Seattle-based offshoot of Raider Klan. This led to Lil Tracy (then known as Yung Bruh) joining Thraxxhouse later on in 2014, and quickly became a fan of GBC. In a 2018 interview with Pitchfork, he stated that he owned a secondhand GBC shirt that he wore "every day, to bed, in the morning, everywhere" and that he "looked up to Wicca Phase almost like on a stan level". He soon asked Horse Head to ask WPSE if he could join, who allowed, saying "Well, he wears the shirt enough!"

In 2015, Thraxxhouse broke up, however GBC continued to operate independently. On September 25, 2016, Lil Peep announced that he had officially joined the group soon after the release of his mixtape Hellboy. The group released their debut collective mixtape Yeah It's True on June 25, 2016. On November 15, 2017, Lil Peep was found dead on his tour bus when his manager went to check on him in preparation for that night's performance at a Tucson, Arizona, venue. In 2018, WPSE and GBC affiliates Lil Zubin, Jon Simmons, Nedarb, Fantasy Camp and Foxwedding formed Misery Club, a sub-group of GBC. In June 2019, GBC headlined a sold-out European tour. On June 28, 2019, they released the single Tiramisu, before departing on a North American headline tour.

== Members ==
=== Current members ===
- Wicca Phase Springs Eternal – vocals (2012–present)
- Horse Head – vocals, production, instrumentation (2012–2020, 2022–present)
- Cold Hart (a.k.a. Jayyeah when producing) – vocals, production (2012–2026) (on hiatus)
- Døves – vocals, production (2014–present)
- Fish Narc – production, instrumentation, occasional vocals (2014–present)
- JPDreamthug – vocals (2014–present)
- Lil Tracy – vocals, occasional production (2014–present)
- Mackned – vocals, production (2014–present)
- Yawns – instrumentation, production (2014–present)

=== Past members ===
- Lil Peep – vocals (2016–2017; his death)

== Discography ==
=== Mixtapes ===
- Yeah It's True (2016)

=== Singles ===
- "Tiramisu" (2019)
- "Brain Swap" (2025)
