= Lil Bo Weep =

Australian rapper (2000–2022)

LiL BO WEEP
- Also known as: Unaloon
- Born: Winona Lisa Green; 2 January 2000; Adelaide, Australia
- Died: 5 March 2022 (aged 22) Adelaide, Australia
- Occupations: Singer; rapper; blogger
- Years active: 2015–2022

Winona Lisa Green (2 January 2000 – 5 March 2022), better known by her stage name Lil Bo Weep and Unaloon, was an Australian singer, rapper, and vlogger.

== Biography ==
Green was born in 2000 in Adelaide, Australia. She moved to Los Angeles, California after high school to attend college and graduate, but later had to return to Australia with her family as part of an emergency DFAT repatriation.

She started releasing tracks on SoundCloud in 2015. She was originally scheduled to feature on XXXTentacion's debut album 17, but in the end the song was not included on the album.

On 27 February 2022, on her Instagram account, she announced that she had been pregnant in 2021, but had lost her child.

== Death ==
Green died on 5 March 2022. Her father Matthew broke the news on Facebook:

This weekend we lost the fight for my daughter's life with depression, trauma, PTSD and drug addiction, which we fought with since they brought her back from America

In her last post on her Instagram page, dated 2 March 2022, she explained that she was on heavy medication due to complex post-traumatic stress disorder and that she was "mourning the loss of her child".

== Discography ==
Compilation albums

- Solos (self-released, 2017)
- Solos 2 (self-released, 2018)

EPs

- Healing Unaloon (self-released, 2017 – credited to Unaloon and Lil Bo Weep)
- Dedicationz 1 (self-released, 2021)
- Illusions (self-released, 2021)
