= Bones (rapper) =

American rapper (born 1994)

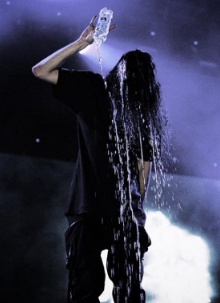
- Bones performing in 2018

Background information
- Also known as: Th@ Kid; Surrenderdorothy; Oregontrail; Ricky A Go Go
- Born: Elmo Kennedy O'Connor; January 11, 1994 (age 32); Muir Beach, California, U.S.
- Origin: Howell, Michigan, U.S.
- Genres: Cloud rap; emo rap; underground rap; trap metal
- Occupations: Rapper; singer; songwriter
- Instrument: Vocals
- Years active: 2010–present
- Label: TeamSESH
- Member of: Surrenderdorothy; Oregontrail
- Formerly of: Seshollowaterboyz
- Children: 2
- Relatives: Joseph Culp (uncle); Robert Culp (grandfather)
- Website: teamsesh.com
- Spouse: Samantha Strysko (m. 2023)

Elmo Kennedy O'Connor (born January 11, 1994), known artistically as BONES, is an American rapper, singer, and songwriter from Howell, Michigan. He is also the founder of the music collective TeamSESH.

O'Connor is known for his pioneering work in sub-genres of hip-hop referred to as emo rap and trap metal. Since 2010, O'Connor has released an extensive discography and developed a large fan base. As of 2024, he has released over 100 albums, mixtapes and EPs across several aliases.

== Early and personal life ==
Elmo Kennedy O'Connor was born in Muir Beach, California in 1994 to mother Rachel Culp, a clothing designer, and father Danny O'Connor, who worked in the music business. His parents had met at a rock concert. His maternal grandfather was actor Robert Culp. His parents moved from Chicago, Illinois to Muir Beach, California, before moving to Howell, Michigan when O'Connor was seven years old. A few years later, he met fellow artists Xavier Wulf, Chris Travis, and Eddy Baker online. The four artists would later come together to form the collective Seshollowaterboyz.

When he was 16 years old, he dropped out of Howell High School and moved to Los Angeles, where his brother and current manager, Elliott, had already been living. In an interview early in his career, O'Connor stated that he had wanted to pursue a music career since he was nine years old: "I started recording raps on the computer. I just didn't know how to go about making it public." Despite moving away from his parents at a young age, O'Connor has spoken positively of them, stating, "If I tried to write a book about, 'oh, what would be dream parents?', I couldn't even make anything better than them. All they do is shower me in love. Unconditional love, forever." O'Connor's older brother Elliott has mentioned the support Elmo received growing up, being quoted in a 2011 article for the Livingston County Daily Press & Argus: "From the start, our parents have been very supportive of Elmo's decision... They've always been open to a lot of different things." O'Connor has described Howell as a "mundane" place where its residents are "born and they die there", also calling it "one of the most racist towns in Michigan".

O'Connor has a son, Howl, born in August 2019, and a daughter, Sunday, born in July 2026. In 2023, O'Connor married fiancée Samantha Strysko in Avalon, California, whom he met at Disneyland through his brother Elliott. Since 2017, O'Connor has resided in Glendale, California.

== Musical career ==
O'Connor first started making music at the age of nine after his father purchased an iMac G3. He would download hip hop instrumentals from SoundClick and use the computer's built-in microphone to record himself rapping, though it wasn't until 2010 at the age of 16 that he would start releasing music online under the alias "Th@ Kid", often on MySpace or other early internet blogging services. After moving to Los Angeles, O'Connor connected with other artists he met online including Xavier Wulf, Chris Travis, and Eddy Baker, who at the time were members of the now semi-disbanded Raider Klan. He later officially changed his stage name to Bones in 2012, often associated with the release of his debut album named Bones.

On July 4, 2012, O'Connor released his eponymous debut album under the alias Bones. From 2012 to 2014 he released 12 albums before gaining journalistic attention for his 2014 album TeenWitch, which gained controversy for its themes based around the Columbine High School massacre. The album following TeenWitch, titled Garbage, was released on June 9, 2014, and was the first of O'Connor's albums to gain the attention of major music publications such as Complex Magazine and The Fader who labelled the project as "massive" and "boundary-pushing." In April 2014, O'Connor, along with TeamSESH producer Greaf, formed "surrenderdorothy", a side project that is notably less focused on rap, with a stronger focus on acoustic guitar and singing, with stylistic similarities to indie rock and emo rap. Although O'Connor does experiment with this style in his solo work, surrenderdorothy features it much more predominantly. Since 2014, the duo have released six EPs as surrenderdorothy.

O'Connor released several albums in 2015 and headlined his first sold-out show at House of Blues on March 4, 2015 before opening for electronic artist Shlohmo at The Fonda Theatre. O'Connor was later featured on ASAP Rocky's "Canal St.", which was a remix of O'Connor's song "Dirt". The song later became O'Connor's first feature on the Billboard charts. Bones performed "Canal St." with ASAP Rocky on the Jimmy Kimmel Live! show, but was cut from the TV broadcast due to his refusal to censor some of the song's lyrics while performing. Videos of the performance were made available online. In May 2015, O'Connor and Greaf started releasing songs under a second side project called Oregontrail. The project is stylistically similar to Surrenderdorothy, but has been noted as having a "darker" and "rougher" tone. It also follows a loose narrative related to the game of the same name which is also reflected in the artwork of the singles. Since 2015, the duo have released seven singles as Oregontrail.

O'Connor released ten albums between 2015 and 2017. In 2016, he began releasing music under a new persona called Ricky A Go Go. He uploaded five tracks in total to a SoundCloud account for this persona with the fifth one being uploaded in 2017.

On January 19, 2018, O'Connor performed in Koko, London, thus starting his first ever European tour, called the Deadboy Tour. It took him to countries such as Germany, Ukraine, Russia and Italy.

O'Connor is a founding member of the collective Seshollowaterboyz, along with Xavier Wulf, Chris Travis and Eddy Baker, with whom he often performs and collaborates. The name of the collective is a mash-up of their self-releasing labels TeamSESH (alongside Dylan Ross), Hollow Squad, Waterboyz and Healthy Boyz. They have performed at notable venues such as The Observatory in Santa Ana, California on November 13, 2015 and The Novo by Microsoft in Los Angeles on January 30, 2016. After Chris Travis left the group in 2019, the remaining members would continue touring under "Bones with Eddy Baker and Xavier Wulf." On March 12, 2024, after Wulf's former girlfriend of five years took to Reddit to accuse him of sexual assault, animal abuse and domestic violence, he was promptly kicked out of the group and off of Limp Bizkit's Loserville Tour. As of July 5th, 2024, BONES and Xavier Wulf have reunited and have performed together at a Robb Bank$ show in downtown Los Angeles and he has been added back to the Loserville Tour.

== Musical style and influences ==
Although O'Connor is often considered to be one of the pioneers of the emo rap sub-genre, O'Connor has said that he has no specific genre, though has been characterized as cloud rap, experimental hip-hop and "shadow rap". O'Connor's singing has been compared to grunge and emo, while his rapping has been compared sub-genres such as horrorcore and emo rap. He is also considered an early pioneer of trap metal.

O'Connor rarely talks about his musical influences, although during interviews he has cited Nas, Master P, Marvin Gaye, Earth Wind & Fire, Bootsy Collins, Stevie Nicks and Joni Mitchell as well as being a fan of popular Myspace-era bands like Enter Shikari. Over the years of his music career, O'Connor helped underground hip hop develop into new styles and has been noted as "one of the most influential underground artists of the internet age".

== Discography ==
=== Bones ===
==== Studio albums ====
WhiteRapper (as Th@ Kid)	Released: July 4, 2012; Labels: Self Released; Formats: digital download
TypicalRapShit (as Th@ Kid)	Released: September 26, 2012; Labels: Self Released; Formats: digital download
BLVCKNWHITE (as Th@ Kid, with Grandmilly)	Released: November 21, 2012; Labels: Self Released; Formats: digital download
Bones	Released: December 1, 2012; Labels: TeamSESH; Formats: digital download
1MillionBlunts	Released: December 25, 2012; Labels: TeamSESH; Formats: digital download
LivingLegend	Released: February 1, 2013; Labels: TeamSESH; Formats: digital download
Saturn	Released: February 23, 2013; Labels: TeamSESH; Formats: digital download
Teenager	Released: March 31, 2013; Labels: TeamSESH; Formats: digital download
ダサい (Lame) (with Xavier Wulf)	Released: June 6, 2013; Labels: TeamSESH; Formats: digital download
Creep	Released: June 8, 2013; Labels: TeamSESH; Formats: digital download
Scumbag	Released: August 8, 2013; Labels: TeamSESH; Formats: digital download, streaming
Cracker	Released: September 28, 2013; Labels: TeamSESH; Formats: digital download, streaming
PaidProgramming	Released: November 1, 2013; Labels: TeamSESH; Formats: digital download, streaming
UndergroundGods (with Na$ty Matt)	Released: November 26, 2013; Labels: TeamSESH; Formats: digital download, streaming
DeadBoy	Released: January 1, 2014; Labels: TeamSESH; Formats: digital download, streaming
TeenWitch	Released: February 24, 2014; Labels: TeamSESH; Formats: digital download, streaming
Garbage	Released: June 8, 2014; Labels: TeamSESH; Formats: digital download, streaming
Skinny	Released: September 1, 2014; Labels: TeamSESH; Formats: digital download, streaming
Rotten	Released: December 2, 2014; Labels: TeamSESH; Formats: digital download, streaming
SongsThatRemindYouOfHome (with Dylan Ross)	Released: February 13, 2015; Labels: TeamSESH, Handzum; Formats: digital download
Powder	Released: April 11, 2015; Labels: TeamSESH; Formats: digital download, streaming
Banshee	Released: August 23, 2015; Labels: TeamSESH; Formats: digital download, streaming
HermitOfEastGrandRiver	Released: November 30, 2015; Labels: TeamSESH; Formats: digital download, streaming
Useless	Released: February 7, 2016; Labels: TeamSESH; Formats: digital download, streaming
PaidProgramming2	Released: July 24, 2016; Labels: TeamSESH; Formats: digital download, streaming
GoodForNothing	Released: October 16, 2016; Labels: TeamSESH; Formats: digital download, streaming
SoftwareUpdate1.0	Released: November 5, 2016; Labels: TeamSESH; Formats: digital download, streaming
Disgrace	Released: January 11, 2017; Labels: TeamSESH; Formats: digital download, streaming
UNRENDERED	Released: April 20, 2017; Labels: TeamSESH; Formats: digital download, streaming
NoRedeemingQualities	Released: June 16, 2017; Labels: TeamSESH; Formats: digital download, streaming
Failure	Released: October 2, 2017; Labels: TeamSESH; Formats: digital download, streaming
Carcass (СКЕЛЕТ)	Released: December 23, 2017; Labels: TeamSESH; Formats: digital download, streaming
Augmented (with cat soup)	Released: April 20, 2018; Labels: TeamSESH; Formats: digital download, streaming
LivingSucks	Released: August 13, 2018; Labels: TeamSESH; Formats: digital download, streaming
TheManInTheRadiator	Released: November 1, 2018; Labels: TeamSESH; Formats: digital download, streaming
SparrowsCreek (with Eddy Baker)	Released: February 11, 2019; Labels: TeamSESH; Formats: digital download, streaming
UnderTheWillowTree	Released: May 3, 2019; Labels: TeamSESH; Formats: digital download, streaming
KickingTheBucket	Released: August 30, 2019; Labels: TeamSESH; Formats: digital download, streaming
IFeelLikeDirt	Released: November 29, 2019; Labels: TeamSESH; Formats: digital download, streaming
OFFLINE	Released: February 24, 2020; Labels: TeamSESH; Formats: digital download, streaming
BRACE (with Xavier Wulf)	Released: March 2, 2020; Labels: TeamSESH; Formats: digital download, streaming
DamagedGoods (with drew the architect)	Released: April 20, 2020; Labels: TeamSESH; Formats: digital download, streaming
REMAINS (with Lyson)	Released: May 30, 2020; Labels: TeamSESH; Formats: digital download, streaming
FromBeyondTheGrave	Released: November 6, 2020; Labels: TeamSESH; Formats: digital download, streaming
BURDEN	Released: January 29, 2021; Labels: TeamSESH; Formats: digital download, streaming
PushingUpDaisies (with Deergod)	Released: March 23, 2021; Labels: TeamSESH; Formats: digital download, streaming
InLovingMemory	Released: June 18, 2021; Labels: TeamSESH; Formats: digital download, streaming
ForbiddenImage (with Cat Soup)	Released: October 15, 2021; Labels: TeamSESH; Formats: digital download, streaming
SCRAPS (with Lyson)	Released: November 26, 2021; Labels: TeamSESH; Formats: digital download, streaming
Withered (with grayera)	Released: April 29, 2022; Labels: TeamSESH; Formats: digital download, streaming
AmericanSweetheart	Released: July 6, 2022; Labels: TeamSESH; Formats: digital download, streaming
DreamCard (with ghost/\/ghoul)	Released: September 13, 2022; Labels: TeamSESH; Formats: digital download, streaming
2MillionBlunts	Released: October 31, 2022; Labels: TeamSESH; Formats: digital download, streaming
TheWitch&TheWizard (with GREAF)	Released: March 10, 2023; Labels: TeamSESH; Formats: digital download, streaming
JonesPeak (with Eddy Baker)	Released: April 14, 2023; Labels: TeamSESH; Formats: digital download, streaming
BasketCase	Released: August 25, 2023; Labels: TeamSESH; Formats: digital download, streaming
Champion	Released: January 26, 2024; Labels: TeamSESH; Formats: digital download, streaming
.ZIP	Released: February 17, 2024; Labels: TeamSESH; Formats: digital download, streaming
ModernArchitecture (with Drew The Architect)	Released: September 20, 2024; Labels: TeamSESH; Formats: digital download, streaming
CADAVER	Released: October 31, 2024; Labels: TeamSESH; Formats: digital download, streaming
SoftwareUpdate2.0	Released: December 18, 2024; Labels: TeamSESH; Formats: digital download, streaming
DEMO (with Brevin Kim)	Released: February 7, 2025; Labels: TeamSESH; Formats: digital download, streaming
EverythingIsWorseAtNight	Released: February 21, 2025; Labels: TeamSESH; Formats: digital download, streaming, cassette
SongsToSleepTo	Released: February 27, 2026; Labels: TeamSESH; Formats: digital download, streaming
ETC.	Released: June 4, 2026; Labels: TeamSESH; Formats: digital download, streaming
AsTheBluntBurnsSlow	Released: July 31, 2026; Labels: TeamSESH; Formats: digital download, streaming
PublicBroadcast	Released: October 5, 2026; Labels: TeamSESH; Formats: digital download, streaming

==== EPs ====
List of EPs shown
Dreamcatcher (as Th@ Kid)	Released: June 2, 2011; Labels: TeamSESH; Formats: digital download
Attaboy (as Th@ Kid)	Released: August 4, 2011; Labels: TeamSESH; Formats: digital download
Midnight:12 AM (as Th@ Kid)	Released: October 14, 2011; Labels: TeamSESH; Formats: digital download
Caves (with Xavier Wulf)	Released: December 14, 2013; Labels: TeamSESH; Formats: digital download
SeaBeds (with Chris Travis)	Released: January 29, 2014; Labels: TeamSESH; Formats: digital download
WeNeverAskedForThis (as Surrenderdorothy)	Released: April 27, 2014; Labels: TeamSESH; Formats: digital download
NobodyWantsMe (as Surrenderdorothy)	Released: July 24, 2014; Labels: TeamSESH; Formats: digital download, streaming
ItsTheLeastWeCanDo (as Surrenderdorothy)	Released: November 9, 2014; Labels: TeamSESH; Formats: digital download, streaming
SoThereWeStood	Released: January 5, 2015; Labels: TeamSESH; Formats: digital download, streaming
ItsTheThoughtThatCounts (as Surrenderdorothy)	Released: February 9, 2015; Labels: TeamSESH; Formats: digital download, streaming
YouShouldHaveSeenYourFace	Released: May 20, 2015; Labels: TeamSESH; Formats: digital download, streaming
HateToBreakItToYou (with Drip-133)	Released: June 8, 2015; Labels: TeamSESH; Formats: digital download, streaming
Frayed	Released: September 26, 2015; Labels: TeamSESH; Formats: digital download, streaming
ItsDifferentNow (as Surrenderdorothy)	Released: November 7, 2015; Labels: TeamSESH; Formats: digital download, streaming
Slán	Released: January 2, 2016; Labels: TeamSESH; Formats: digital download, streaming
NetworkUnknown	Released: November 1, 2017; Labels: TeamSESH; Formats: digital download, streaming
BreathingExercise (as Surrenderdorothy)	Released: March 30, 2018; Labels: TeamSESH; Formats: digital download, streaming
PermanentFrown (with CurtisHeron)	Released: July 2, 2018; Labels: TeamSESH; Formats: digital download, streaming

==== Singles ====
===== As lead artist =====
List of singles as lead artist, with selected chart positions and certifications, showing year released and album name
Title	Year	Peak chart positions		Certifications	Album
Title	Year	US R&B /HH	US Rap	Certifications	Album
"HDMI"	2014	—	—	RIAA: Platinum	Rotten
"Sodium"	2015	—	—	RIAA: Gold	SoThereWeStood
"CtrlAltDelete"	2017	—	—	RIAA: Gold	UNRENDERED
"Morning Dew" (featuring Xavier Wulf)	2018	—	—	RIAA: Gold	Caves
"AirplaneMode"	2019	—	—	RIAA: Gold	IFeelLikeDirt

==== As featured artist ====
List of singles as featured artist, with selected chart positions, showing year released and album name
Title	Year	Peak chart positions				Certifications	Album
Title	Year	US	US R&B /HH	US Rap	NZ Hot	Certifications	Album
"Canal St." (Note: ASAP Rocky's "Canal St." samples BONES's 2013 song "Dirt".) (ASAP Rocky featuring BONES)	2015	— (Note: "Canal St." did not enter the Billboard Hot 100, but peaked at number four on the Bubbling Under Hot 100 Singles chart.)	39	—	—	RIAA: Platinum; MC: Gold; RMNZ: Gold	At. Long. Last. ASAP
"Orgy in the Morgue" (vein.fm featuring Bones)	2022						This World Is Going to Ruin You
"Now and at the Hour of Our Death" (Suicideboys featuring Bones)	2025	100	26	15	13		Thy Kingdom Come

=== Ricky A Go Go ===
==== Mixtapes ====
- PleasureUltimate (2024)
- Erotica (2026)

==== Singles ====
- "The Whisper of Sweet Nothings" (2016)
- "On the Run" (2016)
- "You Are My Everything" (2016)
- "Every Night" (2016)
- "Stranger" (2017)
- "You Know I Want You" (2017)
- "Death Train" (2021)

=== surrenderdorothy ===
==== Mixtapes ====
- NobodyWantsMe (2014)
- breathingexercise (2018)
- ItsDifferentNow (2018)
- ItsTheLeastWeCanDo (2018)
- justwhatthedoctorordered (2019)
- julyrent (2019)
- thishouseisnotahome (2023)
- thankyouhero (2025)

==== Singles ====
- "Human for a Day" (2014)
- "It All Comes Together in the Final Act" (2015)
- "Sitting in the Car" (2016)
- "No Place Like Home" (2016)
- "Sometimes I Don't Understand" (2016)
- "Like the Back of My Hand" (2016)
- "Caught between the Seats" (2016)
- "What Great Eyes You Have" (2017)
- "Drop Everything" (2018)

=== Oregon Trail ===
==== Singles ====
- "Goodbye for Now"
- "If All Else Fails"
- "We Have Been Keeping Quite Busy"
- "I Admit, It Has Not Been Easy"
- "Till the Whites of My Eyes Dry Out"
- "We Fought the Good Fight"
- "Ford the River"
- "Second Hand Pain"

=== Th@ Kid ===
==== Mixtapes ====
- ADayAtTheGetty
- YoungDumbFuck
- [KNUCKLEHEAD]
- TEAM SESH
- Strictly for the RATZ
- AttaBoy
- BoredOfEducation
- Cousin Eddie
- DreamCatcher
- FOOL$GOLD
- TheGoodRatZ
- Holy Smokes
- Howell
- MARBLE
- Midnight:12AM
- RATBOY
- RatLyfe
- Stay Golden
- Stifler
