= Lost on You (Tigers Jaw album) =

2026 studio album by Tigers Jaw

Studio album by Tigers Jaw
- Released: March 26, 2026
- Recorded: 2025
- Length: 38:16
- Label: Hopeless
- Producers: Will Yip; Tigers Jaw

Tigers Jaw chronology
I Won't Care How You Remember Me (2021)	Lost on You (2026)

Singles from Lost on You
- 1. "Head is Like a Sinking Stone" Released: December 5, 2025; 2. "Ghost" Released: January 7, 2026; 3. "Primary Colors" Released: February 4, 2026; 4. "Breezer" Released: March 4, 2026

Lost on You is the seventh studio album by the American rock band Tigers Jaw. The album was released on March 26, 2026 through Hopeless Records, their second with the label.

The album marked a five year gap between releases, their longest gap between albums.

== Critical reception ==
Professional ratings
Review scores
Source	Rating
Distorted Sound	9/10
DIY	4/5 stars
Dork	4/5 stars
Kerrang!	4/5 stars
Northern Transmissions	7/10

Upon release, Lost on You has been well-received by contemporary music critics. In a four-star review, Joe Goggins of DIY praised the passion of the album although he said it was not exactly expansive. Specifically, Goggins said of the band and the album that "there is no reinvention of the wheel here from Tigers Jaw, but when they do heart-on-sleeve emo this convincingly, that doesn’t matter." Rachel Roberts of Kerrang! praised the emotional lyricism saying "this is an album that might make you bawl your eyes out, but it may also make you feel like things are gonna work out okay. The results will probably vary on every listen, and depending where your own head’s at."

== Track listing ==
All tracks are written by Brianna Collins, Colin Gorman, Mark Lebiecki, Teddy Roberts, Benjamin Walsh, and Will Yip, except "It's OK" (written by Collins, Walsh, and Yip).

Lost on You track listing
No.	Title	Length
1.	"It's Ok"	1:41
2.	"Primary Colors"	3:37
3.	"Head is Like a Sinking Stone"	3:01
4.	"Anxious Blade"	2:47
5.	"Baptized on Redwood Drive"	5:37
6.	"Breezer"	3:30
7.	"Ghost"	2:29
8.	"Staring at Empty Faces"	3:30
9.	"Light Leaks Through"	3:58
10.	"Roses + Thorns"	4:35
11.	"Lost on You"	3:31
Total length:		38:16

== Personnel ==
Credits adapted from Tidal.

=== Tigers Jaw ===
- Brianna Collins – vocals, production (all tracks), piano (1), keyboards (2–11)
- Colin Gorman – production (all tracks), bass (2–11)
- Mark Lebiecki – production (all tracks), guitar (2–11)
- Theodore Roberts – production (all tracks), drums, percussion (2–11)
- Benjamin Walsh – vocals, guitar, production (all tracks)

=== Additional contributors ===
- Will Yip – production, mixing
- Chris Gehringer – mastering

== Charts ==
Chart performance for Lost on You
Chart (2026)	Peak position
Scottish Albums (Official Charts)	68
UK Independent Albums (Official Charts)	42
UK Record Store (OCC)	19
