= Raider Klan =

American hip hop collective from Miami

- Origin: Miami Gardens, Florida, U.S.
- Genre: Southern hip hop
- Years active: 2008–2015; 2017
- Label: Raider Klan
- Past members: SpaceGhostPurrp; Black Kray; Dough Dough Da Don; Kadafi; Muney Junior; Jitt; Denzel Curry; Xavier Wulf; Chris Travis; Yung Raw; Key Nyata; Amber London; Yung Simmie; IndigoChildRick; Nell; Rell; Dirty Redd; Big Zeem; Grandmilly; Almighty Bumpin; Lil Champ Fway; Chiiirp; Shvun Dxn; Dead Craig; Sky Lexington; Slim Guerilla; Ruben Slikk; Mike Dece; Deck; Lofty305; Young Renegade; Junko Headhuntah; Matt Stoops; Smurfo; Soulja Mook; JGRXXN; MuffLucid; Eddy Baker; Kahzee; Harvey G; Clip 275; Percival Fatz; Nisha Blanco; Yung Kane; Klvn Tyler; Klvn Sailor; Klvn Rico; DJ Manny Virgo; Yung Trap Gxd; Lee Bannon; Aston Matthews; Phlo Finister; Stunnaman

Raider Klan (stylized as RVIDXR KLVN) was an American hip hop collective formed in the Carol City neighborhood of Miami Gardens, in 2008. It grew to include members from other U.S. cities, such as Memphis, Seattle (Thraxxhouse), Atlanta and Houston. They are widely regarded by fans, critics, and fellow artists as one of the most influential hip hop movements of the 2010s. In 2012, the Guardian cited them as one of the key acts bringing back hip hop groups.

At its peak, the collective enjoyed a period of rapid growth, emerging alongside groups such as Odd Future and ASAP Mob. Raider Klan originally included rappers SpaceGhostPurrp, Dough Dough Da Don, Kadafi, Muney Junior, and Jitt, before expanding to include Denzel Curry, Chris Travis, Eddy Baker, Xavier Wulf, Ruben Slikk, Lofty305, and dozens more. Many former members went on to pursue successful solo careers or form new groups, such as Seshollowaterboyz and Schemaposse.

== History ==
In 2008, SpaceGhostPurrp recruited Dough Dough Da Don, Kadafi, Muney Junior and Jitt to form the founding line-up of Raider Klan. SpaceGhostPurrp asked Denzel Curry to join the group after hearing his debut mixtape King Remembered Underground Tape 1991–1995, which Curry accepted.

On September 24, 2012, the group released 2.7.5. Greatest Hits Vol.1, a 44 track compilation of members solo and collaborative material. On March 1, 2013, they released their second compilation CD, BRK Greatest Hits Vol.2 : Collectors Edition. They released their debut album Tales from the Underground on October 31, 2013. The group's final release was 2015's The Mixtape 2.75.

== Musical style and influence ==
AllMusic described Raider Klan's Southern hip hop style as "gritty" and "macabre", and Miami New Times described their music as "trad[ing] in the battering sounds of SoundCloud rap, a blood-raw strand of hardcore hip-hop largely pioneered in South Florida". The group often used a dark and lo-fi style of production. In 2018, HotNewHipHop said "For over a decade, Raider Klan has been making noise in Carol City with records featuring the same distorted bass, intentionally choppy sounds that we hear throughout Lil Pump and Ski Mask the Slump God's records today".

Raider Klan's sound was derived primarily from the early work of Memphis hip hop group Three 6 Mafia, while also incorporating elements of emo, house hardcore hip hop, drill and horrorcore. In a 2019 interview, Denzel Curry cited Odd Future as an important influence on the group.

Lyrically, they focused on topics ranging from drugs, sex and money to witchcraft, demons and hotep philosophy.

Raider Klan were one of the first underground rap collectives to integrate the style of early-Three 6 Mafia into their music, a pattern subsequently embraced throughout the hip hop scene, namely in the form of ASAP Mob and Drake. In 2018 article by Pitchfork writer Alphonse Pierre described Raider Klan members and affiliates such as Denzel Curry, Chris Travis, Xavier Wulf and Bones as pioneers of the Soundcloud rap movement.

The group's form of lyrical self expression was cited by Genius as influential to emotional rappers like XXXTentacion and Lil Uzi Vert. HotNewHipHop described Night Lovell's style of emo rap as heavily influenced by the music of the group. Ronny J's style of production was heavily inspired by Raider Klan, incorporating their style into tracks for rappers like XXXTentacion, Lil Pump, Smokepurpp and Ski Mask the Slump God. Rolling Stone described the music of Soundcloud rappers XXXTentacion, Lil Pump, Ski Mask the Slump God, Smokepurpp and WifisFuneral as derived from Raider Klan's material.

== Aesthetics ==
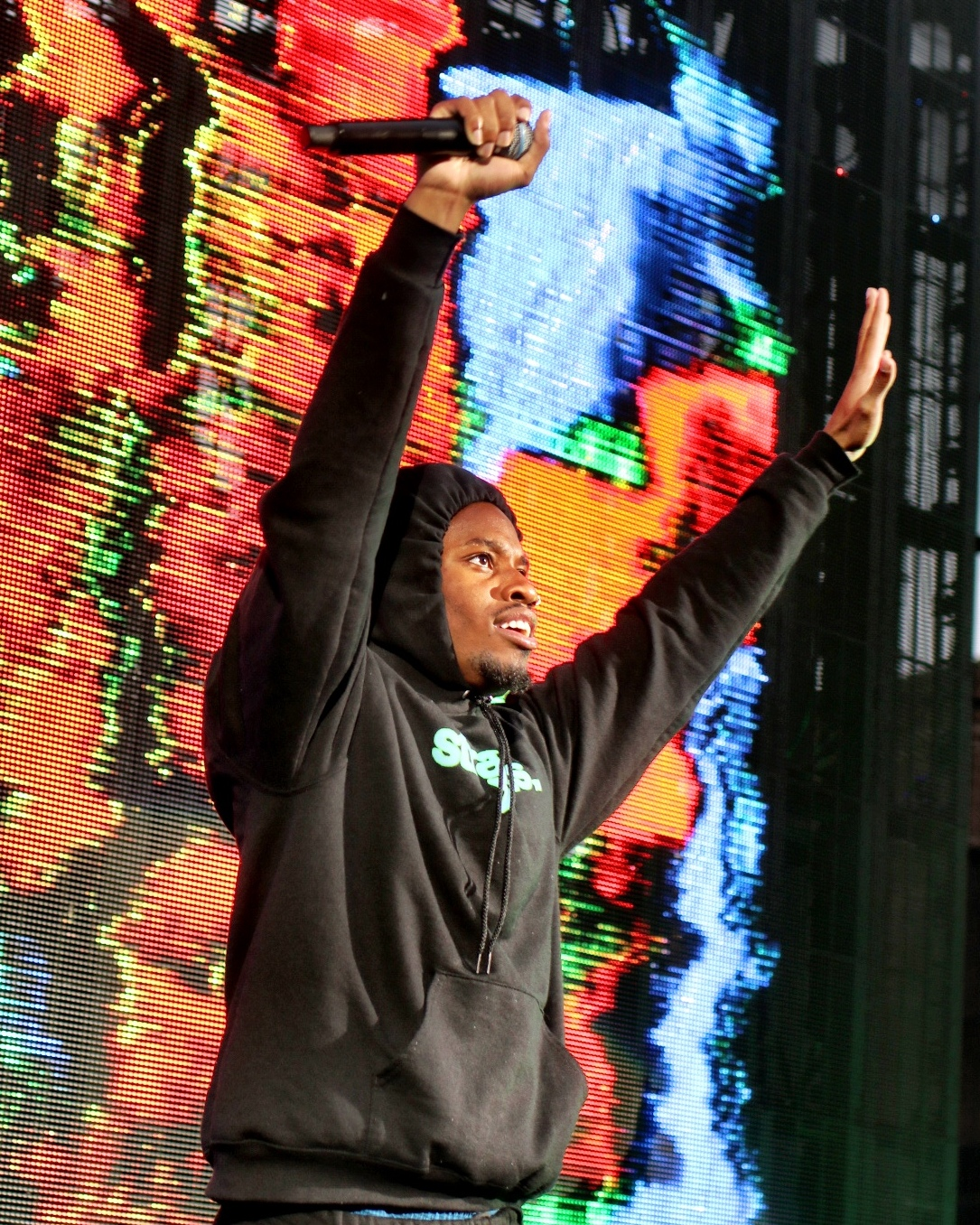
Former Raider Klan member Denzel Curry

From the beginning of their career, Raider Klan made use of hieroglyphs-inspired text, in which most vowels in English language sentences were substituted with "V" or "X", and stylized in all capitals. Occasionally a "Z" will substitute an "S".

Letter	Translation
A	V
E	X
O	X
U	V

The origin of the style came about through SpaceGhostPurrp's fascination with Kemetism and Egyptian mythology, and as a way of having a language only members and fans of the group could understand. This style would eventually come to be used by other groups such as ASAP Mob.

The group's album covers often include features such as cannabis leaves, skulls and Horror film inspired fonts.

Raider Klan members often wore all black clothing, which SpaceGhostPurrp explained as being to represent their "black hearts". Because of this, in a 2012 article by The Guardian, writer Kieran Yates described them as "rap goths".

== Members ==
- SpaceGhostPurrp
- Dough Dough Da Don
- Kadafi
- Muney Junior
- Jitt
- Denzel Curry
- Xavier Wulf
- Chris Travis
- Key Nyata
- Amber London
- Lil Fway a.k.a. Lil Champ Fway
- Yung Simmie
- IndigoChildRick
- Nell
- Rell
- Black Kray
- Dirty Redd
- Muff Lucid
- Big Zeem
- Grandmilly
- Chiiirp
- Shvun Dxn
- Eddy Baker
- Dead Craig
- Sky Lexington
- Slim Guerilla
- Mike Dece
- Young Renegade
- Matt Stoops
- Soulja Mook
- JGRXXN
- MuffLucid
- Junko
- Harvey G
- Junko Headhuntah
- Robb Bank$

== Discography ==
Albums

- Tales from the Underground (2013)

Compilations

- 2.7.5. Greatest Hits Vol.1 (2012)
- BRK Greatest Hits Vol. 2: Collectors Edition (2013)

Mixtapes

- The Mixtape 2.75 (2015)
