= Emo rap =

Fusion genre of hip hop and emo music

- Other names: Emo hip hop; sad rap; bop-punk
- Stylistic origins: Hip-hop; trap; cloud rap; emo; pop punk; nu metal; indie rock; post-hardcore
- Cultural origins: Mid-2010s, United States
- Typical instruments: Vocals; audio editing software; digital audio workstation; sequencer; sampler; synthesizer; guitar
- Derivative forms: HexD; hyperpop; digicore; rage

Other topics
- Crunkcore; SoundCloud rap; trap metal; Sad Boys

Emo rap (also known as emo hip hop or sad rap) is a subgenre of hip hop influenced by emo. It emerged during the early 2010s through the SoundCloud rap scene, and fuses trap music-style beats with sing-rapping vocals. The scene was originally pioneered by artists such as Black Kray's Goth Money Records, Bones and GothBoiClique members Wicca Phase Springs Eternal, Lil Tracy and Lil Peep. The genre was popularized in the mainstream by Lil Peep, Trippie Redd, $uicideboy$, XXXTentacion, and Juice Wrld.

== Characteristics ==
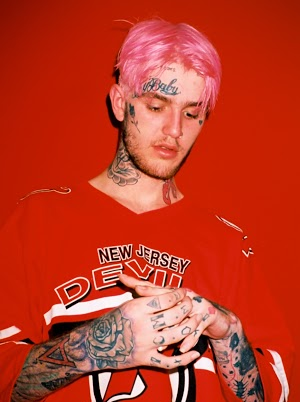
Emo rapper Lil Peep in August 2016

Publications have described emo rap as taking influence from hip hop, emo, trap, pop punk, nu metal, indie rock, post-hardcore, and cloud rap.

Emo rap departs from the traditional tones found in modern mainstream hip hop in favor of more emotional and personal lyrical content, described by The Wall Street Journal as "giving their elders the finger." Lyrics tend to focus on topics such as depression, loneliness, anxiety, consumption of drugs and alcohol, nihilism, suicide, heartbreak, and self-medication. The genre is characterized by its combination of musical elements commonly found in conscious hip hop with indie rock instrumentals. Sampling often uses 2000s pop punk and emo songs. Much of the sampling has been influenced by artists who inspired the genre, such as Mineral, Underoath, and the Postal Service. Some emo rappers also make use of original instrumentation. Horse Head of the collective GothBoiClique has described the music as "...sort of nostalgic, but it's new too...no one's really done shit like this. It's like emo rap and melodic trap".

Fans of the music are sometimes referred to as "sad boys", in reference to emo rapper Yung Lean's music group by the same name.

== History ==
=== Precursors ===
Prior to emo rap solidifying itself as a genre, the term was applied by critics to rappers such as Joe Budden, Eminem, Kanye West, and Drake due to their emotional styles of lyric writing. American rapper Slug of Atmosphere claimed in 2017 that he invented the name "emo rap" in an IR Magazine article from 1997. The music of German rapper Casper, which was influenced by both hip hop and bands like Give up the Ghost, Modern Life is War, and Grave Digger, was often referred to as "emo rap" early on in his career. Huffington Post writer Kia Makarechi described American group Hollywood Undead as "crass emo-rap" in 2012 article.

Additionally, between the 1990s and early 2010s, there was a number of significant crossovers between the hip hop scene and the emo and pop punk scenes. Zebrahead have been playing a style of music that features vocalist Ali Tabatabaee rapping over pop punk instrumentals since the band's formation in 1995. Rapper MC Lars has been making use of samples and references to emo and pop punk songs in his music since his 2004 debut album. Pop punk band Good Charlotte, often stated that they took influence from hip hop and in 2007 released the album Greatest Remixes, which consisted of a number of their previously released songs being remixed by both hip hop and pop punk musicians such as Jay E, Patrick Stump, Marshall Goodman, and William Beckett. In 2005, Stump and Pete Wentz founded DCD2 Records, which signed both emo and hip hop artists, who would often collaborate and tour alongside one another. DCD2 signees Cobra Starship and Gym Class Heroes also merged elements of both genres. In 2006, rapper Kanye West remixed emo pop band Fall Out Boy's song "This Ain't a Scene, It's an Arms Race". Fearless Records released the album Punk Goes Crunk in 2008, which was made up of emo and pop punk musicians covering popular hip hip songs. Emo band Framing Hanley covered rapper Lil Wayne's song "Lollipop" in 2008 and Lil Wayne went on to collaborate with emo band Weezer in 2009, on the song "Can't Stop Partying" off of the band's album Raditude. In 2012, prominent pop-punk band Blink-182 featured rapper Yelawolf on the track "Pretty Little Girl" from their Dogs Eating Dogs EP.

In 2013, Swedish rapper Yung Lean released the track "Ginseng Strip 2002", the debut mixtape Unknown Death 2002. He later formed the collective Sad Boys (SBE), which publications such as the Guardian and Recording Arts Canada have, in retrospective, recognized as influential on the then-upcoming emo rap genre.

=== 2012–2016: Origins ===
Emo rap was pioneered by Bones, whose VHS-recorded music videos and dark production and aesthetic were so influential on the hip hop underground of the time that Dazed described him as the "underground rap king." In 2012, members of Thraxxhouse, a subgroup of Raider Klan, formed GothBoiClique (GBC), with the intention of drawing connections between the emo, trap, dark wave, black metal, and indie rock scenes. Bones and other genre pioneers like Black Kray and 90's Bambino also drew heavily upon the influence of witch house. GBC's style of emo rap influenced swathes of artists in the underground emo and hip hop scenes on SoundCloud, with Lil Lotus, Lil Peep and Lil Tracy, all citing the group as an influence and the latter-most two even eventually becoming members. During this time, a DIY ethos came to define the genre, to the extent that when Shinigami released his debut album Luna on Spotify, he was derided as a sellout, due to the streaming service's ability to monetize.

=== 2017–2019: Popularity and deaths ===
In 2017, Lil Uzi Vert's song "XO Tour Llif3" became a sleeper hit. The song, characterized as emo hip hop due to its lyrics referring to suicide and emotional breakdowns, peaked at number seven on the Billboard Hot 100. In August 2017, XXXTentacion released his debut album 17 with the lead single "Jocelyn Flores" which addresses the suicide of a friend and Lil Uzi Vert released their debut studio album Luv Is Rage 2. The release of both the projects and their high peak on the Billboard 200 became defining moments for emo rap in the mainstream. At the same time, Lil Peep was branded by Pitchfork the "future of emo" in January 2017; further, in April 2017, The Guardian concluded that his "continuing rise is testament to the timeless appeal of introspection."

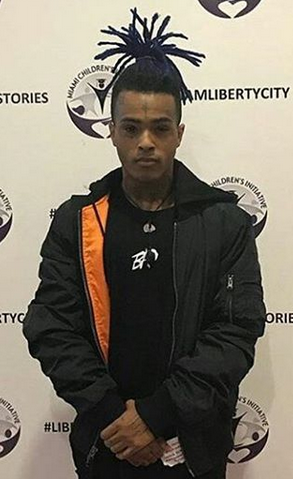
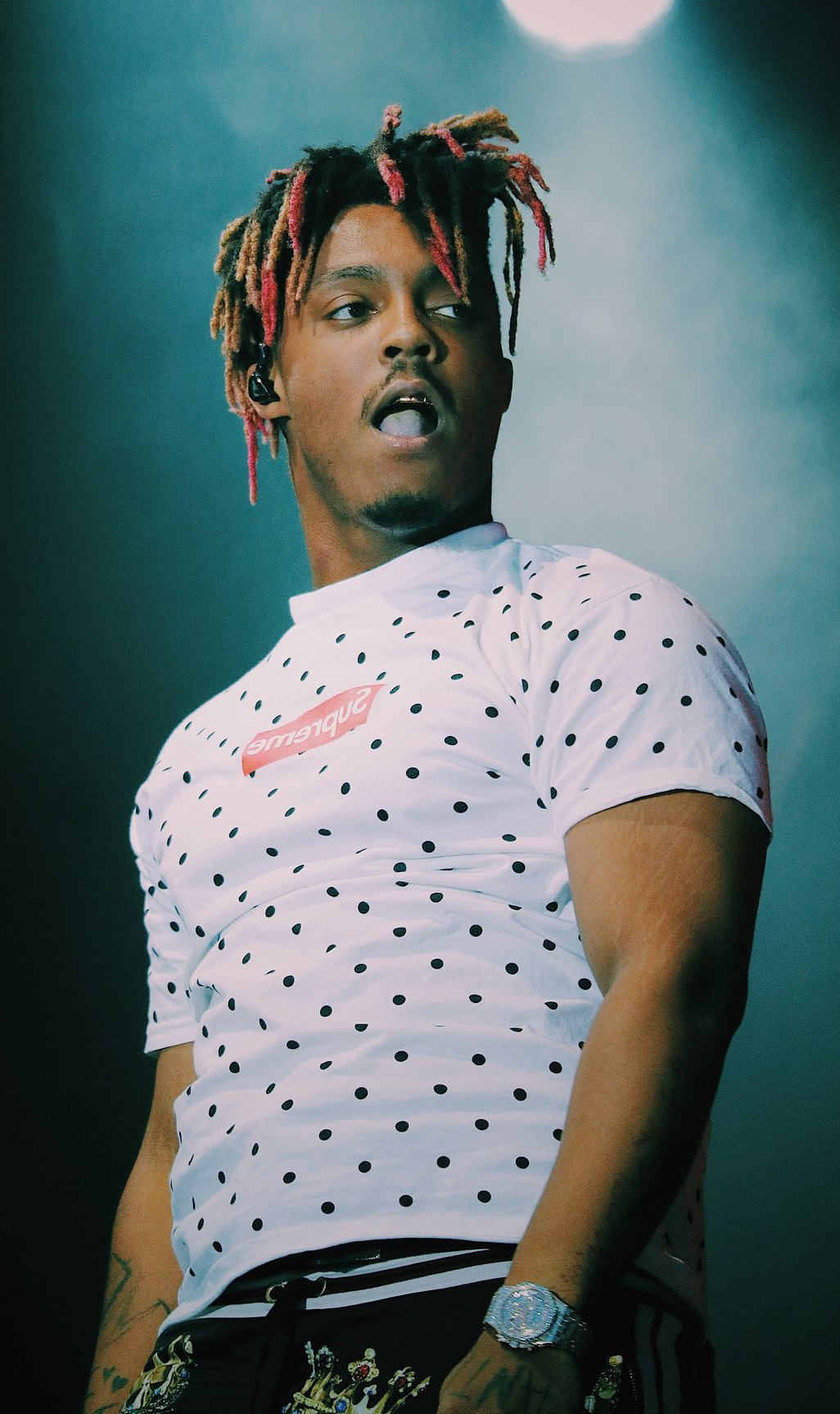
Emo rappers XXXTentacion (left) and Juice Wrld (right), leading emo rappers until their deaths

A sample of XXXTentacion's song "Sad!", from his 2018 album ?. The song topped the Billboard Hot 100 chart and is the best selling emo rap song of all-time.

In November 2017, Lil Peep died of a Fentanyl overdose. Shortly afterwards, Lil Peep's debut studio album Come Over When You're Sober, Pt. 1 and the lead single "Awful Things" charted on the Billboard charts. His death brought increased notability to the genre as a whole and particularly to artists such as Trippie Redd and Lil Aaron. In June 2018, XXXTentacion was murdered, and like Peep, his albums 17 and ? charted the following week, along with his hit song "SAD!" charting at number one on the Billboard Hot 100. In September 2018, a posthumous collaboration between the two artists, "Falling Down" was released and became certified platinum in the US. The same year, emo rap was the fastest-growing genre on Spotify in 2018. In December 2019, Juice WRLD died after suffering a seizure, induced by an overdose of oxycodone and codeine. He was known to most people for the songs "All Girls Are the Same" and "Lucid Dreams", the latter which peaked at number two on the Billboard Hot 100 in 2018 and returned to the chart in 2019 at number eight following his death.

In 2018, Nothing,Nowhere released his second album Reaper. The album was described by The New York Times as an "outstanding album that synthesizes the second-wave emo of the early to mid-2000s [sic] with the rattling hip-hop low end of the last few years. It is one of the most promising pop albums of the year; the logical, and perhaps inevitable, endpoint of hip-hop's broad diffusion into every corner of American musical life; and also the most viable current direction for guitar-driven music in the mainstream." Revolver described him as one of the leading stars of the emo rap movement.

=== 2019–2022: Second wave ===
In the early 2020s, notable emo rappers 24kGoldn, Poorstacy, the Kid Laroi, Powfu and Iann Dior were all signed by labels where they released their debut EPs. On February 8, 2020, Powfu released their single "Death Bed (Coffee for Your Head)" with Beabadoobee, which peaked at number one on the U.S. Hot Rock/Alternative Songs chart. On July 24, 2020, Dior and 24kGoldn released the chart-topping song "Mood", which is currently certified quadruple platinum. Forbes described 2020 as "The Year Rap Artists Rule the Rock Charts", while Spin writer Al Shipley described the merger of pop punk and rap as 2020's "commercial juggernaut". In March 2022, emo rapper Lil Bo Weep died of a drug overdose after a long struggle with depression and complex post-traumatic stress disorder after the loss of a child.

== Influence ==
The popularity of emo rap led to a number of mainstream musicians incorporating elements of it into their music in the late-2010s and early-2020s. Notable artists to do so include Justin Bieber, Ariana Grande, and Miley Cyrus.

Emo rap, along with styles like cloud rap, trap, dubstep, trance, chiptune and pop music were influential on the development of the hyperpop genre. The genre gained mainstream attention in the late 2010s and early 2020s through artists such as 100 gecs, Charli XCX, and Dorian Electra.

The genre also brought about a revived interest in pop punk in the mainstream. This interest led to the 2020s pop punk revival. In particular, Machine Gun Kelly's album Tickets to My Downfall was described by the Evening Standard as "bridg[ing] the gap" between the contemporary pop punk and emo rap scenes. During this time, a number of emo rappers such as Trippie Redd, Lil Tracy, Cold Hart, Lil Aaron, and 24kGoldn also began releasing pop punk albums and songs.

== See also ==
- Alternative hip hop
- List of emo rap artists
- List of hip hop genres
- Internet rap
