= Wicca Phase Springs Eternal =

American musician

- Born: Adam McIlwee; March 11, 1989 (age 37); Scranton, Pennsylvania, U.S.
- Genres: Emo rap; trap; emo; pop punk; indie rock
- Occupation: Musician
- Instruments: Vocals, guitar, keyboards
- Years active: 2005–present
- Labels: Run for Cover, Dark Medicine, Summersteps, Prison Jazz
- Member of: GothBoiClique, Pay for Pain
- Formerly of: Misery Club, Tigers Jaw, Thraxxhouse

Adam Andrzejewski (born McIlwee on March 11, 1989), often known by the stage name Wicca Phase Springs Eternal (WPSE), is an American musician from Scranton, Pennsylvania. Beginning his career as a member of the emo band Tigers Jaw, he soon began pursuing a solo career with a sound based in hip hop, emo and witch house. He has worked as a member of collectives such as GothBoiClique, Thraxxhouse and Misery Club. He also played in the indie rock band Pay for Pain.

== Early life ==
Andrzejewski grew up in Scranton, Pennsylvania. His maternal grandparents owned a funeral home. The death of his maternal grandfather led Andrzejewski's father to begin attending mortuary school and begin working at the funeral home. When Andrzejewski was ten, his father developed a substance abuse problem, which led to him often being booked into drug rehabilitation centres up until the time Andrzejewski turned eighteen. When Andrzejewski was twelve, one of his aunts died by suicide. From the age of thirteen he was a frequent user of the internet, often spending his time on anime and wrestling message boards.

== Career ==
=== Tigers Jaw (2005–2013) ===
Tigers Jaw was founded in 2005 by Ben Walsh and Adam Andrzejewski, during high school, with Brianna Collins joining after the first couple of months, taking their name from a song by lo-fi band The Microphones. Members have cited Fall Out Boy and My Chemical Romance as early musical influences. The band released their debut album Belongs to the Dead on October 3, 2006, which was followed by a self-titled album on September 10, 2008. AbsolutePunk gave their self-titled album a generally positive review, noting that "Tigers Jaw is fueled by emotionally-driven lyrics brought to life by vocalist Adam Andrzejewski, whose voice is one of those that reveal passion while at the same time giving the impression that he's barely trying. Aforementioned opener "The Sun" is one of the better tracks on the album, offering up a well-organized mix of Tigers Jaw's two personas." Punknews.org, in their critique of the album, felt that the tracks "'Plane vs. Tank vs. Submarine' and 'Chemicals' were particularly notable for "solid guitar work in the form of weeping, goosebump-inducing solos. Strong vocal harmonies and bouncy guitar work carry both 'I Saw Water' and 'Heat' to heights other bands would have a hard time reaching." Their third album Two Worlds was released on November 23, 2010. In November 2012, the group supported Title Fight on their headlining US tour. In 2013, Andrzejewski departed from the group to pursue his solo-career. He, along with two other departing members, helped finish the group's fourth album Charmer before leaving.

=== GothBoiClique (2012–present) ===
GothBoiClique was formed in 2012 through Andrzejewski attempting to put together a group through Tumblr with the intention of forming a collective of musicians who could mutually collaborate with and produce for one another and drawing connections between the emo, trap, dark wave, black metal and indie rock scenes. The founding line-up consisted of Wicca Phase, Cold Hart and Horse Head, taking their name from a beat titled "Gothboiclique" that Cold Hart had produced, which when Andrzejewski read the name he jokingly tweeted "RT if you’re goth boi clique". The members of the group continued mostly independently for the next two years, despite continuing to gain members. In 2014, the members met each other in person, and soon after GBC became a sub-group of the newly founded hip hop collective Thraxxhouse, This led to Lil Tracy (then known as Yung Bruh) joining Thraxxhouse later on in 2014, and quickly became a fan of GBC. In a 2018 interview with Pitchfork, he stated that he owned a secondhand GBC t-shirt that he wore "every day, to bed, in the morning, everywhere" and that he "looked up to Wicca Phase almost like on a stan level". He soon asked Horse Head to ask WPSE if he could join, who allowed, saying "Well, he wears the shirt enough!"

In 2015, Thraxxhouse fell apart, however GBC continued to operate independently. The group released their debut collective mixtape "Yeah it's True" on June 25, 2016. On September 25, 2016, Lil Peep was announced that he had officially joined the group soon after the release of his Hellboy release. On November 15, 2017, Lil Peep was found dead on his tour bus when his manager went to check on him in preparation for that night's performance at a Tucson, Arizona venue. In 2018, WPSE and GBC affiliates Lil Zubin, Jon Simmons, Nedarb, Fantasy Camp and Foxwedding formed Misery Club, a sub-group of GBC. In June 2019, GBC headlined a solo-out European tour. On June 28, 2019, they released the single Tiramisu, before departing on a North American headline tour.

=== Wicca Phase Springs Eternal (2013–present) ===
While still a member of Tigers Jaw, Andrzejewski began composing electronic music, which he would eventually release under the Wicca Phase Springs Eternal moniker. After his departure from the band, he began advertising his intentions for his new project through Tumblr and Twitter. His first solo-release was the song "Bite My Ear" with Tigers Jaw keyboardist Brianna Collins. On September 30, 2014, he released the EP Passionate Yet. On May 22, 2015, he released the album Abercrombie & Me. On February 26, 2016, he released the album Secret Boy. In 2016, he appeared as a featured artist on Lil Peep's mixtape, Crybaby. On February 28, 2017, he released the acoustic EP Stop Torturing Me On March 16, 2018, he released the five track EP Corinthiax, which follows a female spirit character of Andrzejewski's creation. On June 22 and 23, he opened for Code Orange on their The New Reality tour. On November 23, 2018, he released the EP Spider Web. On February 12, 2019, he released his second album Suffer On through Run for Cover Records. On October 21, he released the single "Hardcore", produced by Darcy Baylis, the song was a departure from the sound that had defined Suffer On, with the Fader stating that "it’s a more forceful cut than anything Andrzejewski has released as Wicca Phase." Between November 2 and 11, he toured Europe alongside Lil Zubin. From December 6 to 12, he toured the U.S. alongside Glitterer, Anxious and Creeks. On July 31, 2020, he released the five-track This Moment I Miss EP, which included the previously released song "Hardcore". On February 10, 2021, he released a deluxe version of Suffer On, which included an acoustic performance of every song on the album. He released his new album Full Moon Mystery Garden on November 4, 2022. It was produced by Garden Avenue.

=== Thraxxhouse (2014–2015) ===
Thraxxhouse was a hip hop collective formed in 2014, as a Seattle offshoot of Florida's Raider Klan collective. It was started by rappers Mackned and Key Nyata, who took its name from Lil B's 2009 mixtape I'm Thraxx and the genre of witch house. They soon became based in a shared house in Boyle Heights, Los Angeles. On September 2, 2015, they performed as a group at the Crocodile in Seattle. Additional members of the collective included Horse Head, Lil Tracy, Cold Hart, Nedarb, AJ Suede, Fish Narc and SneakGuapo. In mid-2015, founder Key Nyata left the group, and by the end of the year, the group had dissolved due to the increasing trouble in administering the group's large number of members.

=== Other projects ===
In 2017, Andrzejewski and Jon Simmons formed Coward. They released a single album that same year.

In April 2018, Andrzejewski, Lil Zubin, Jon Simmons, Nedarb, Fantasy Camp and Foxwedding formed Misery Club. They are a sub-group of GothBoiClique and describe themselves as an "emo boy band". Publications have categorised them as playing alternative hip hop and emo rap. On June 21, 2018, Misery Club released their debut EP Club Misery, which was followed by the Lost Inside the Night April 12, 2019.

In 2020, Andrzejewski formed the indie rock band Pay for Pain, which includes former Tigers Jaw musicians Dennis Mishko and Pat Brier. Their debut self-titled EP was released on June 5, 2020, through Dark Medicine Records.

Around 2011 Andrzejewski briefly played in the Scranton hardcore punk band Bad Seed.

== Musical style and influence ==
He has cited influence including the Streets, Das Racist, Twin Shadow, Blink-182, Gucci Mane, Salem, Ferrari Boyz, Nick Cave, Leonard Cohen and Phil Elverum.

The Chicago Reader wrote that his music "threads together emo, trap beats, and occultism" and DIY stated that his music "mixes blackened, acoustic guitar-led cuts with those signature 808s, creating an intoxicating, truly modern hybrid that foregoes preconceptions, genre boundaries and artistic limitations."

Both Andrzejewski's solo music and work with GothBoiClique had a massive impact on the SoundCloud rap scene, with NME describing him as "the figurehead of rap’s gothic reinvention". His music has been cited as an influence by musicians including Lil Lotus, Cold Hart, Lil Peep and Lil Tracy.

== Discography ==
=== Studio albums ===
Title	Album details
#HELLVERSION	Released: September 17, 2013; Label: Independent; Format: Digital download, streaming
Abercrombie & Me	Released: May 22, 2015; Label: Independent; Format: Digital download, streaming
Secret Boy	Released: February 26, 2016; Label: Independent; Format: Digital download, vinyl, streaming
Suffer On	Released: February 15, 2019; Label: Run for Cover Records; Format: Digital download, vinyl, compact disc, tape, streaming
Full Moon Mystery Garden	Released: November 11, 2022; Label: Independent; Format: Digital download, streaming
Wicca Phase Springs Eternal	Released: June 2, 2023; Label: Run for Cover Records; Format: Digital download, vinyl, streaming
mossy oak shadow	Released: September 19, 2025; Label: Run for Cover Records; Format: Digital download, vinyl, streaming

=== Extended plays ===
Title	EP details
Missing Child	Released: March 11, 2014; Label: Independent; Format: Digital download, streaming
Outside Yr Window	Released: April 23, 2014; Label: Independent; Format: Digital download, streaming
Passionate Yet	Released: September 30, 2014; Label: Independent; Format: Digital download, streaming
She Doesn't Believe in Thelema	Released: April 15, 2016; Label: Independent; Format: Digital download
Stop Torturing Me	Released: February 28, 2017; Label: Independent; Format: Digital download, streaming
Corinthiax	Released: March 16, 2018; Label: Independent; Format: Digital download, Tape, streaming
Spider Web	Released: November 23, 2018; Label: Independent; Format: Digital download, streaming
The Moment I Miss	Released: July 31, 2020; Label: Run for Cover Records; Format: Digital download, Tape, streaming
Midnight at the Castle Moorlands	Released: October 25, 2024; Label: Run for Cover Records; Format: Digital download, streaming

=== Collaborative ===
Title	EP details
#FEB13 (with Fantasy Camp)	Released: February 14, 2013; Label: Independent; Format: Digital download, streaming
ULTRACLUB4K (with døves)	Released: May 1, 2020; Label: Independent; Format: Digital download, streaming, cassette
Surrender (with Zubin and Parv0)	Released: April 16, 2021; Label: Independent; Format: Digital download, streaming
Virtual Love Letters (with Smrtdeath and Fantasy Camp)	Released: August 5, 2021; Label: Independent; Format: Digital download, streaming
Wicca Phase Springs Eternal / Pillars of Ivory (Split) (with Pillars of Ivory)	Released: November 2, 2021; Label: Streets of Hate; Format: Digital download, streaming, vinyl

=== With Tigers Jaw ===
Title	Album details
Belongs to the Dead	Released: October 1, 2006; Label: Summersteps Records; Format: Compact disc, vinyl, streaming, digital download
Tigers Jaw	Released: September 10, 2008; Label: Prison Jazz; Format: Compact disc, vinyl, streaming, digital download
Two Worlds	Released: November 23, 2010; Label: Independent; Format: Compact disc, vinyl, streaming, digital download
Charmer	Released: June 3, 2014; Label: Run For Cover Records; Format: Compact disc, vinyl, tape, streaming, digital download

=== With GothBoiClique ===
Title	EP details
Yeah it's True	Released: June 25, 2016; Label: Independent; Format: Digital download, streaming

=== With Coward. ===
Title	Album details
Coward.	Released: December 16, 2017; Label: Independent; Format: Digital download, streaming

=== With Misery Club ===
Title	Album details
Club Misery	Released: June 21, 2018; Label: Independent; Format: Digital download, streaming
Lost Inside the Night	Released: April 12, 2019; Label: Independent; Format: Digital download, streaming

=== With Pay for Pain ===
Title	Album details
Pay for Pain	Released: June 5, 2020; Label: Dark Medicine Records; Format: Digital download, Vinyl, streaming
