= Lil Peep discography =

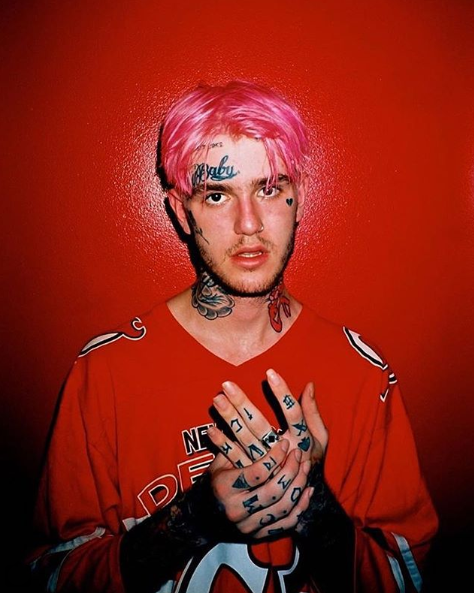
- Lil Peep in 2016
- Studio albums: 2
- EPs: 16
- Mixtapes: 4
- Compilation albums: 1
- Singles: 53
- Collaborative albums: 1
- Collaborative mixtapes: 1

Lil Peep was an American rapper who released two studio albums, one compilation album, one collaborative album, five mixtapes, and sixteen extended plays throughout his career. Seven of these projects were released posthumously, following his death in 2017.

His debut studio album Come Over When You're Sober, Pt. 1 was released in August 2017 and peaked at number thirty-eight on the Billboard 200. The album spawned four singles: "Benz Truck (гелик)", "The Brightside", "Awful Things" and "Save That Shit". In January 2018, his first posthumous single "Spotlight" with Marshmello was released. It was then followed by "4 Gold Chains" with Clams Casino and "Falling Down" with fellow deceased rapper XXXTentacion in the same year. Shortly after, the original version was released, "Sunlight on Your Skin", with a verse featuring American rapper, iLoveMakonnen.

Peep's first posthumous project, Come Over When You're Sober, Pt. 2, was announced in October 2018 and was released on November 9, 2018. The project had three singles: "Cry Alone", "Runaway" and a remix of the song "Life", which was renamed "Life Is Beautiful". Both "Falling Down" and "Sunlight on Your Skin" were added as bonus tracks to the deluxe version of Come Over When You're Sober, Pt. 2.

Peep's second posthumous project, Everybody's Everything, released on November 15, 2019, the second anniversary of Peep's death. This album was also the official soundtrack to an accompanying documentary of the same name about the late Lil Peep's life. The album contained singles from regular collaborator, producer and friend BigHead, including a formal re-release of their hit "Witchblades" and an official release of "Liar" and "Aquafina" featuring Rich the Kid.

== Albums ==
=== Studio albums ===
List of studio albums, with selected details and peak chart positions
Title	Album details	Peak chart positions										Certifications
Title	Album details	US	US R&B/HH	AUS	AUT	CAN	DEN	GER	NZ	SWE	UK	Certifications
Come Over When You're Sober, Pt. 1	Released: August 15, 2017; Label: Autnmy, AWAL; Formats: Digital download,CD, LP, cassette	38	16	—	54	34	32	82	19	11	71	RIAA: Platinum; BPI: Gold; RMNZ: Platinum; IFPI DAN: Gold
Come Over When You're Sober, Pt. 2	Released: November 9, 2018; Label: Autnmy, Columbia; Formats: Digital download, CD, LP, cassette	4	—	15	17	4	12	26	9	3	19	RIAA: Platinum; BPI: Gold; MC: Gold; RMNZ: Gold; IFPI DAN: Gold; BVMI: Gold
"—" denotes a recording that did not chart or was not released in that territory.

=== Compilation albums ===
Title	Album details	Peak chart positions								Certifications
Title	Album details	US	AUS	AUT	CAN	GER	NZ	SWE	UK	Certifications
Everybody's Everything	Released: November 15, 2019; Label: Autnmy, Columbia; Formats: Digital download, CD, LP, cassette, streaming	14	55	50	13	94	27	32	63	BPI: Gold

=== Mixtapes ===
List of mixtapes, with selected details
Title	Mixtape details	Peak chart positions								Certifications
Title	Mixtape details	US	AUS	AUT	CAN	GER	NZ	SWE	UK	Certifications
Lil Peep; Part One	Released: September 18, 2015 (re-released on September 18, 2024); Label: Self-released (re-released via AWAL); Format: Digital download, streaming, CD, LP, cassette	—	—	—	—	—	—	—	—	
Live Forever	Released: December 2, 2015 (re-released on December 2, 2022); Label: Self-released (re-released under Autnmy via AWAL); Format: Digital download, streaming, CD, LP, cassette	—	—	—	—	—	—	—	—	
Crybaby	Released: June 10, 2016 (re-released on June 10, 2020); Label: Self-released (re-released under Autnmy via AWAL); Format: Digital download, streaming, CD, LP, cassette	102	—	45	—	51	36	—	—	RIAA: Gold; BPI: Silver; RMNZ: Gold
Hellboy	Released: September 25, 2016 (re-released on September 25, 2020); Label: Self-released (re-released under Autnmy via AWAL); Format: Digital download, streaming, CD, LP, cassette	52	45	23	71	52	26	58	37	BPI: Silver
"—" denotes a recording that did not chart or was not released in that territory.

== Collaborative albums ==
=== Collaborative studio albums ===
List of collaborative albums, with selected details
Title	Album details
Diamonds (with iLoveMakonnen)	Released: September 8, 2023; Label: AWAL; Formats: Digital download, streaming

=== Collaborative mixtapes ===
List of collaborative mixtapes, with selected details
Title	Album details
Mall Musicc (with Boy Froot)	Released: November 1, 2015; Label: Self-released; Format: Digital download, streaming

== Extended plays ==
List of extended plays, with selected details
Title	EP details
Feelz	Released: May 16, 2015 (re-released on May 20, 2022); Label: Self-released (re-released under Autnmy via AWAL); Format: Digital download, streaming
In the Bedroom, I Confess (with OmenXIII)	Released: June 17, 2015 (re-released on June 17, 2026); Label: Self-released (re-released under AWAL); Format: Digital download, streaming
Garden (with Death Plus)	Released: August 25, 2015 (remastered on January 20, 2018); Label: Self-released; Format: Digital download, streaming
Romeo's Regrets (with Bexey)	Released: November 14, 2015 (re-released on November 14, 2025); Label: Self-released (re-released under AWAL); Format: Digital download, streaming
Vertigo	Released: December 19, 2015 (re-released on March 5, 2020); Label: Self-released (re-released under AUTNMY); Format: Digital download, streaming
California Girls (with Nedarb)	Released: January 16, 2016 (re-released on January 29, 2021); Label: Self-released (re-released under AUTNMY via AWAL); Format: CD, vinyl, cassette, digital download, streaming
Elemental (with Jgrxxn & Ghostemane)	Released: February 9, 2016; Label: Self-released; Format: Digital download
Dead Broke (with ITSOKTOCRY)	Released: March 3, 2016; Label: Self-released; Format: Digital download
Teen Romance (with Lederrick)	Released: June 19, 2016 (re-released on June 19, 2024); Label: Self-released (re-released via AWAL); Format: Digital download, streaming
Castles (with Lil Tracy)	Released: July 4, 2016 (re-released on July 2, 2021); Label: Self-released (re-released under Autnmy via AWAL); Format: CD, vinyl, cassette digital download, streaming
Castles II (with Lil Tracy)	Released: February 6, 2017 (re-released on July 2, 2021); Label: Self-released (re-released under Autnmy via AWAL); Format: CD,vinyl, cassette Digital download, streaming
Goth Angel Sinner (with Fish Narc)	Released: October 31, 2019; Label: Autnmy, Columbia; Format: Digital download, streaming
Friends (with Yunggoth)	Released: November 5, 2021; Label: Autnmy (via AWAL); Format: Digital download, streaming
High Fashion (with Harry Fraud)	Released: December 3, 2021; Label: Autnmy (via AWAL); Format: Digital download, streaming
Changes (with Meeting by Chance)	Released: May 31, 2023; Label: AWAL; Format: Digital download, streaming
Hate Me	Released: March 8, 2024; Label: AWAL; Format: Digital download, streaming

== Singles ==
Title	Year	Peak chart positions							Certifications	Album
Title	Year	US	AUS	CAN	CZE	NZ	SWE	UK	Certifications	Album
"Girls" (featuring Horse Head)	2017	—	—	—	—	—	—	—	RIAA: Gold	Hellboy
"White Wine" (with Lil Tracy)	2017	—	—	—	—	—	—	—	RMNZ: Gold	Castles
"Kiss"	2017	—	—	—	—	—	—	—		Non-album singles
"Honestly"	2017	—	—	—	—	—	—	—		Non-album singles
"Beamer Boy"	2017	—	—	—	—	—	—	—	RIAA: 2× Platinum; ARIA: 2× Platinum; BPI: Silver; RMNZ: Platinum	California Girls
"Absolute in Doubt" (featuring Wicca Phase Springs Eternal)	2017	—	—	—	—	—	—	—		Crybaby
"Benz Truck (гелик)"	2017	—	—	—	39	—	—	—	RIAA: Platinum; ARIA: Gold; BPI: Silver; RMNZ: Platinum	Come Over When You're Sober, Pt. 1
"The Brightside"	2017	—	—	—	76	—	—	—	BPI: Silver; RMNZ: Gold	Come Over When You're Sober, Pt. 1
"Awful Things" (featuring Lil Tracy)	2017	79	—	58	28	—	—	—	RIAA: 2× Platinum; ARIA: Gold; BPI: Silver; RMNZ: Gold	Come Over When You're Sober, Pt. 1
"Save That Shit"	2017	—	—	97	40	—	75	—	RIAA: 4× Platinum; ARIA: 3× Platinum; BPI: Platinum; RMNZ: 2× Platinum; SNEP: Gold	Come Over When You're Sober, Pt. 1
"Nightslayer" (with Bexey)	2017	—	—	—	—	—	—	—		Non-album singles
"Avoid" (featuring Wicca Phase Springs Eternal and Døves)	2017	—	—	—	—	—	—	—		Non-album singles
"Spotlight" (with Marshmello)	2018	— (Note: "Spotlight" did not enter the Billboard Hot 100, but peaked at number three on the Bubbling Under Hot 100 Singles chart.)	—	73	—	—	61	74	RIAA: Platinum; BPI: Silver; RMNZ: Gold	Non-album singles
"4 Gold Chains" (featuring Clams Casino)	2018	—	—	—	—	—	—	—		Non-album singles
"Falling Down" (with XXXTentacion)	2018	13	7	5	3	1	1	10	RIAA: 4× Platinum; ARIA: Platinum; BPI: Platinum; MC: 2× Platinum; RMNZ: 4× Platinum; SNEP: Gold	Come Over When You're Sober, Pt. 2
"Sunlight on Your Skin" (with ILoveMakonnen)	2018	—	—	—	—	— (Note: "Sunlight on Your Skin" did not enter the NZ Top 40 Singles Chart, but peaked at number 36 on the NZ Hot Singles Chart.)	—	—		Come Over When You're Sober, Pt. 2
"Cry Alone"	2018	—	—	—	51	— (Note: "Cry Alone" did not enter the NZ Top 40 Singles Chart, but peaked at number 20 on the NZ Hot Singles Chart.)	96	—		Come Over When You're Sober, Pt. 2
"Runaway"	2018	—	—	—	28	— (Note: "Runaway" did not enter the NZ Top 40 Singles Chart, but peaked at number 28 on the NZ Hot Singles Chart.)	— (Note: "Runaway" did not enter the Swedish Singellista Chart, but peaked at number 18 on the Swedish Heatseeker Chart.)	—	RIAA: Gold; BPI: Silver; RMNZ: Gold	Come Over When You're Sober, Pt. 2
"Life Is Beautiful"	2018	— (Note: "Life Is Beautiful" did not enter the Billboard Hot 100, but peaked at number four on the Bubbling Under Hot 100 Singles chart.)	—	—	10	— (Note: "Life Is Beautiful" did not enter the NZ Top 40 Singles Chart, but peaked at number six on the NZ Hot Singles Chart.)	— (Note: "Life Is Beautiful" did not enter the Swedish Singellista Chart, but peaked at number two on the Swedish Heatseeker Chart.)	87	RIAA: Platinum; BPI: Silver; RMNZ: Gold	Come Over When You're Sober, Pt. 2
"I've Been Waiting" (with ILoveMakonnen featuring Fall Out Boy)	2019	62	—	—	—	— (Note: "I've Been Waiting" did not enter the NZ Top 40 Singles Chart, but peaked at number 12 on the NZ Hot Singles Chart.)	— (Note: "I've Been Waiting" did not enter the Swedish Singellista Chart, but peaked at number 13 on the Swedish Heatseeker Chart.)	—	RIAA: Platinum	Greatest Hits: Believers Never Die – Volume Two
"Star Shopping"	2019	—	—	—	—	— (Note: "Star Shopping" did not enter the NZ Top 40 Singles Chart, but peaked at number 22 on the NZ Hot Singles Chart.)	—	—	RIAA: 5× Platinum; ARIA: 6× Platinum; BPI: Platinum; RMNZ: 3× Platinum	Non-album singles
"Gym Class"	2019	—	—	—	—	—	—	—	RMNZ: Gold	Non-album singles
"Me and You" (with Cold Hart)	2020	—	—	—	—	—	—	—		Non-album singles
"Keep My Coo"	2021	—	—	—	—	—	—	—		Everybody's Everything
"Ghost Boy"	2021	—	—	—	—	—	—	—	RMNZ: Gold	Lil Peep: Part One & Everybody's Everything
"Live Forever"	2021	—	—	—	—	—	—	—		Live Forever & Everybody's Everything
"Liar"	2021	—	—	—	—	—	—	—		Everybody's Everything
"Halloween" (featuring Rainy Bear)	2021	—	—	—	—	—	—	—		Non-album singles
"Right Here" (featuring Horse Head)	2021	—	—	—	—	—	—	—		Non-album singles
"Nuts" (featuring Rainy Bear)	2021	—	—	—	—	— (Note: "Nuts" did not enter the NZ Top 40 Singles Chart, but peaked at number 40 on the NZ Hot Singles Chart.)	—	—	RIAA: 2× Platinum; ARIA: 2× Platinum; BPI: Gold; RMNZ: Platinum	Live Forever
"About U"	2022	—	—	—	—	—	—	—		Non-album single
"Flannel"	2022	—	—	—	—	—	—	—		Live Forever
"Haunt U"	2022	—	—	—	—	—	—	—		Live Forever
"Runaway" (OG version)	2023	—	—	—	—	—	—	—		Come Over When You're Sober, Pt. 2 (OG Version)
"Your Eyes"	2023	—	—	—	—	—	—	—		Non-album singles
"Switch Up"	2023	—	—	—	—	—	—	—		Non-album singles
"November" (with ILoveMakonnen)	2023	—	—	—	—	—	—	—		Diamonds
"Hollywood Dreaming" (with Gab3)	2024	—	—	—	—	—	—	—		Non-album singles
"No Respect Freestyle"	2024	—	—	—	—	—	—	—		Non-album singles
"Lil Angel"	2024	—	—	—	—	—	—	—		Non-album singles
"Latitude"	2024	—	—	—	—	—	—	—		Non-album singles
"Giving Girls Cocaine" (with Lil Tracy)	2024	—	—	—	—	—	—	—		Non-album singles
"I Crash, U Crash" (with Lil Tracy)	2024	—	—	—	—	—	—	—		Non-album singles
"Kisses in the Wind" (with Lil Tracy)	2024	—	—	—	—	—	—	—		Non-album singles
"Last Fall" (with Lil Tracy and Horse Head)	2025	—	—	—	—	—	—	—		Non-album singles
"Just in Case"	2025	—	—	—	—	— (Note: "Just in Case" did not enter the NZ Top 40 Singles Chart, but peaked at number 24 on the NZ Hot Singles Chart.)	—	—		Non-album singles
"Tears"	2025	—	—	—	—	—	—	—		Non-album singles
"Downtown"	2025	—	—	—	—	—	—	—		Non-album singles
"Gods" (with Lil Tracy)	2025	—	—	—	—	—	—	—		Non-album singles
"Love Letter"	2025	—	—	—	—	— (Note: "Love Letter" did not enter the NZ Top 40 Singles Chart, but peaked at number 38 on the NZ Hot Singles Chart.)	—	—		Non-album singles
"Stop the Car" (with Horse Head)	2026	—	—	—	—	— (Note: "Stop the Car" did not enter the NZ Top 40 Singles Chart, but peaked at number 30 on the NZ Hot Singles Chart.)	—	—		Non-album singles
"Getting Money Still Sad Too" (with Horse Head)	2026	—	—	—	—	—	—	—		Non-album singles
"Don't Panic"	2026	—	—	—	—	—	—	—		Non-album singles
"Sex (Last Nite)"	2026	—	—	—	—	—	—	—		Non-album singles
"Benz Truck Pt. 2"	2026	—	—	—	—	— (Note: "Benz Truck Pt. 2" did not enter the NZ Top 40 Singles Chart, but peaked at number 26 on the NZ Hot Singles Chart.)	—	—		Non-album singles
"—" denotes a recording that did not chart or was not released in that territory.

== Other charted songs ==
List of other charted songs, with selected chart positions, showing year released and album name
Title	Year	Peak chart positions				Certifications	Album
Title	Year	CZE	NZ Hot	SVK	SWE Heat.	Certifications	Album
"California World" (with Nedarb featuring Craig Xen)	2016	—	16	—	—		California Girls
"Let Me Bleed" (with Nedarb)	2016	—	38	—	—		California Girls
"Lil Kennedy" (with Nedarb)	2016	—	40	—	—		California Girls
"Ghost Girl"	2016	—	—	—	—	RIAA: Gold	crybaby
"White Tee" (featuring Lil Tracy)	2016	—	—	—	—	RIAA: 2× Platinum; BPI: Silver; RMNZ: Platinum	crybaby
"U Said"	2017	70	—	—	—	RMNZ: Gold	Come Over When You're Sober, Pt. 1
"Better Off (Dying)"	2017	82	—	—	—	BPI: Silver; RMNZ: Gold	Come Over When You're Sober, Pt. 1
"Broken Smile (My All)"	2018	33	8	27	—	RIAA: Gold	Come Over When You're Sober, Pt. 2
"Sex with My Ex"	2018	43	9	30	1	RIAA: Gold	Come Over When You're Sober, Pt. 2
"Leanin'"	2018	81	—	60	—		Come Over When You're Sober, Pt. 2
"16 Lines"	2018	80	18	58	—	RMNZ: Gold	Come Over When You're Sober, Pt. 2
"Hate Me"	2018	96	—	67	—		Come Over When You're Sober, Pt. 2
"IDGAF"	2018	83	—	61	—		Come Over When You're Sober, Pt. 2
"White Girl"	2018	—	—	98	—		Come Over When You're Sober, Pt. 2
"Witchblades" (with Lil Tracy)	2019	—	18	—	—	RIAA: Platinum; BPI: Silver; RMNZ: Gold	Castles II & Everybody's Everything
"Fangirl" (featuring Gab3)	2019	—	38	—	—		Everybody's Everything
"Your Favorite Dress" (with Lil Tracy)	2021	—	39	—	—		Castles II
"Feelz"	2022	—	35	—	—		Feelz
"—" denotes a recording that did not chart or was not released in that territory.

== Guest appearances ==
List of guest appearances
Title	Year	Other performer(s)	Album
"Never Alone"	2015	OmenXIII	Mindgames
"Family"	2015	OmenXIII	____
"On the Floor"	2015	Yunggoth	Dead with You
"Bitch I'ma Kill You"	2015	JGrxxn, Ghostemane	—N/a
"October"	2015	Hector Vaé	—N/a
"Words You Hear on a Sinking Ship"	2015	JGrxxn, Ghostemane	—N/a
"Swamp Theme"	2015	OmenXIII	—N/a
"Mo' Murda"	2015	Neeks	—N/a
"Black Fingernails"	2015	SoWhatImDead	—N/a
"Another Cup"	2016	Drippin' So Pretty	—N/a
"Backstage Shawty"	2016	Nedarb	—N/a
"RunninOutOfTime (R.O.O.T.)"	2016	P2theGoldMa$k	—N/a
"Niagara"	2016	Ghostemane	Rituals
"Rain"	2016	Mikey the Magician	—N/a
"P2M"	2016	EndyEnds	—N/a
"Emo Nite"	2016	Little Pain	—N/a
"Ashamed of Myself"	2016	Little Pain	—N/a
"Ignorant"	2016	Little Pain	—N/a
"Homecoming"	2016	Killstation, JGrxxn, Ghostemane, Kold-Blooded, OmenXIII, Brennan Savage	—N/a
"On the Run"	2016	Cold Hart	—N/a
"Dying"	2016	Cold Hart	—N/a
"P.S. Fuck You Cunt"	2016	Fat Nick	When the Lean Runs Out
"Blueberry Lemonade"	2016	Craig Xen, Nedarb	—N/a
"The Kronik"	2016	Kronik Williams	—N/a
"Water Damage"	2016	Wavy Jone$	Reality Is a Hoax & Humans Are a Disease
"Down for You"	2016	Cold Hart	The OC Season 2
"Hate My Life"	2016	Mysticphonk	—N/a
"(New World Order)"	2016	Ski Mask the Slump God, Lil Tracy	—N/a
"Dreams"	2016	Gizmo	—N/a
"No Love"	2016	Mikey Cortez	—N/a
"Drip"	2016	CHXPO, Agoff	Lil Charizard EP
"Kiss Me"	2016	Horse Head	—N/a
"Missed Calls"	2016	Mackned	American Boy
"Apparition Love"	2016	YungJZAisDead, Nedarb, J Trauma	—N/a
"Doubt Me"	2016	Eddy Baker	—N/a
"Oh It's Lit"	2016	Fat Nick	—N/a
"Smokepurpp on a bean"	2016	Smokepurpp	—N/a
"Fantasy"	2016	Pollàri	Forever, Yours
"Not the One"	2016	SinceWhen	Your Name Is Still My Password
"Crying"	2017	Yunggoth	—N/a
"Backseat"	2017	Lil Tracy	—N/a
"Getting Money, Still Sad Too"	2017	Horse Head	—N/a
"Hollywood Dreaming"	2017	Gab3	—N/a
"4am In LA"	2017	Chxpo	Emo Savage
"Oh"	2017	Lil Raven, Lil Tracy	Fly Away
"Man Down"	2017	KirbLaGoop, Lil Tracy	Goop
"Unify"	2017	AGoff	—N/a
"Suicide"	2017	Mackned	—N/a
"Overdose"	2017	Smokeasac	—N/a
"In Dis Bih"	2017	Thouxanbanfauni, Lil Tracy	XOXO
"Going Through My Cellphone"	2017	Mackned, Sneakguapo	—N/a
"Pictures 2"	2017	Mackned, Lil Tracy	Hollywood Dropout
"Black Jeep"	2017	Mackned, Cold Hart	Hollywood Dropout
"U Don't Know Me"	2017	Original Gods	The Second Coming
"Night Slayer"	2017	Bexey	—N/a
"Supernova/Reflection"	2017	Slug Christ	—N/a
"Time Bomb"	2017	Horse Head	This Mess Is My Mess
"Visine"	2017	Antwon	Sunnyvale Gardens
"Poor Thing"	2017	Jaxxon D. Silva	Poor Thing
"ZZZ"	2017	Milkavelli	Cult Member
"Get Fucked Up"	2017	Marty Baller	—N/a
"I Can't Feel My Face"	2017	KirbLaGoop, Mackned	Trapped In da 100
"Got 'Em Like"	2018	Juicy J, Wiz Khalifa	ShutDaFukUp
"Dreams & Nightmares"	2018	Teddy	—N/a
"Spine"	2021	Gab3	Ready to Rave?
