= OMFG =

OMFG may refer to:

- Oh My Fucking God, an exclamation abbreviated as OMFG in SMS language
- "OMFG", a song by Deluka
- "OMFG", a song by Lil Peep from Hellboy, 2016

== See also ==
- OMG (disambiguation)
- Oh My God (disambiguation)
