= Everybody's Everything (album) =

Compilation album by Lil Peep
- Released: November 15, 2019
- Recorded: 2014–2017
- Length: 57:42
- Labels: AUTNMY, Columbia Records
- Producers: Fish Narc; Big lo$; Smokeasac; IIVI; Louis Bell; Jayyeah; ILoveMakonnen; Brenton Duvall; Rozz Dyliams; BigHead; Diplo; Nedarb; Yung Cortex

Lil Peep chronology
Goth Angel Sinner (2019)	Everybody's Everything (2019)	Friends (2021)

Singles from Everybody's Everything
- 1. "Goth Angel Sinner" Released: October 31, 2019; 2. "Keep My Coo" Released: July 1, 2021; 3. "ghost boy" Released: July 1, 2021; 4. "Live Forever" Released: July 1, 2021; 5. "Liar" Released: July 1, 2021

Everybody's Everything (stylized in all caps) is the first compilation album by American rapper Lil Peep. It was released on November 15, 2019, by AUTNMY via Columbia Records, on the second anniversary of his untimely death in 2017. The album was announced on November 1, 2019, which would have been the rapper's 23rd birthday. The album was released alongside a documentary of the same name. Several pop-up events to take place in November in New York City and Los Angeles were planned. The album was supported by three singles: "Moving On", "Belgium", and "When I Lie". The latter three songs are from his EP, Goth Angel Sinner, which was released on October 31, 2019. They were also re-released with the singles "Keep My Coo", "Ghost Boy", "Live Forever" and "Liar".

== Background ==
The album features a collection of new and previously unreleased tracks. New tracks featured are the collaborations with Gab3 as well as the solo song "Princess", while previously released tracks include "Cobain" and "Walk Away as the Door Slams" from the mixtape Hellboy, "witchblades" from the EP Castles II which was produced by Bighead, and all three tracks from the EP Goth Angel Sinner. Regular producer and collaborator Bighead has re-release features on the album which in addition to "Witchblades" includes "Liar" as well as the new track "Aquafina" featuring Rich the Kid. A press release described the album as "a lovingly-curated collection of songs from Lil Peep's career".

== Critical reception ==
Professional ratings
Aggregate scores
Source	Rating
AnyDecentMusic?	6.6/10
Metacritic	70/100
Review scores
Source	Rating
AllMusic	3.5/5 stars
Clash	8/10
The Guardian	3/5 stars
NME	3/5 stars
Northern Transmissions	7/10
Pitchfork	7.4/10
RapReviews	6.5/10
Rolling Stone	3.5/5 stars

According to the review aggregator Metacritic, Everybody's Everything received "generally favorable reviews" based on a weighted average score of 70 out of 100 from nine critic scores.

== Track listing ==
No.	Title	Producer(s)	Length
1.	"Liar"	Fish Narc; BigHead	2:52
2.	"Aquafina" (featuring Rich the Kid)	BigHead; Scott Theft	3:02
3.	"Ratchets" (with Lil Tracy and Diplo)	Diplo	3:12
4.	"Fangirl" (featuring Gab3)	Fish Narc; BetterOffDead	2:06
5.	"LA to London" (featuring Gab3)	Fish Narc; BetterOffDead	3:18
6.	"Rockstarz" (featuring Gab3)	Fish Narc; BetterOffDead	2:18
7.	"Text Me" (featuring Era)	Era; Bagelboi; Pharaoh Vice	2:25
8.	"Princess"	Jayyeah	4:10
9.	"Moving On"	Fish Narc	3:23
10.	"Belgium"	Fish Narc	4:00
11.	"When I Lie"	Fish Narc	3:57
12.	"I've Been Waiting" (original version) (featuring ILoveMakonnen)	IIVI; Brian Lee; Louis Bell; ILoveMakonnen; Brenton Duvall	3:54
13.	"Live Forever"	Brobak	2:40
14.	"Ghost Boy"	Rozz Dyliams	2:10
15.	"Keep My Coo"	Big Lo$; Rozz Dyliams	4:26
16.	"White Tee" (with Lil Tracy)	Nedarb	2:08
17.	"Cobain" (with Lil Tracy)	Smokeasac	2:30
18.	"Witchblades" (with Lil Tracy)	BigHead; Yung Cortex	2:30
19.	"Walk Away as the Door Slams" (acoustic) (featuring Lil Tracy)	IIVI	1:58
Total length:			57:42

Notes

- "Live Forever" samples "Just a Boy" by Walleater.
- "Ghost Boy" samples "The House" by The Softies.
- "White Tee" samples "Such Great Heights" by The Postal Service.
- "Cobain" samples "Bad News" by Owen.
- "Witchblades" samples "The Real You" by Three Days Grace.
- "Walk Away as the Door Slams" (acoustic) is an acoustic cover of the song from Hellboy, which samples the acoustic version of "155" by +44.

== Charts ==
Chart (2019)	Peak position
Australian Albums (ARIA)	55
Austrian Albums (Ö3 Austria)	50
Belgian Albums (Ultratop Flanders)	61
Belgian Albums (Ultratop Wallonia)	167
Canadian Albums (Billboard)	13
Czech Albums (ČNS IFPI)	97
Dutch Albums (Album Top 100)	51
Estonian Albums (IFPI)	8
Finnish Albums (Suomen virallinen lista)	36
French Albums (SNEP)	142
German Albums (Offizielle Top 100)	94
Irish Albums (IRMA)	48
Lithuanian Albums (AGATA)	10
New Zealand Albums (RMNZ)	27
Norwegian Albums (VG-lista)	30
Swedish Albums (Sverigetopplistan)	32
Swiss Albums (Schweizer Hitparade)	76
UK Albums (Official Charts)	63
UK R&B Albums (Official Charts)	16
US Billboard 200	14
US Top Alternative Albums (Billboard)	2
US Top R&B/Hip-Hop Albums (Billboard)	9

== Certifications ==
Certifications and sales for Everybody's Everything
Region	Certification	Certified units/sales
United Kingdom (BPI)	Gold	100,000^{‡}
^{‡} Sales+streaming figures based on certification alone.
