= John Womack =

American economist (born 1937)

- Born: John Womack Jr. August 14, 1937 (age 89); Norman, Oklahoma, U.S.
- Relatives: Lil Peep (grandson)

Academic background
- Education: Harvard University (BA, PhD); Merton College, Oxford

Academic work
- Discipline: Historian; economist
- Institutions: Harvard University
- Main interests: 20th-century Mexican history

John Womack Jr. (born August 14, 1937) is an American economist and historian of Mexico, the Mexican Revolution (1910–1920), and Emiliano Zapata. He is a former professor of Latin American history and economics at Harvard University. He is the grandfather of the rapper Lil Peep.

== Early life and education ==
Womack was born in Norman, Oklahoma, on August 14, 1937, to John Womack Sr., also a historian. He graduated summa cum laude from Harvard University in 1959 and became a Rhodes Scholar at Merton College, Oxford.

In the 1960s, he returned to Harvard University, where he was awarded a PhD in history. His doctoral research led to the publication of his most notable book, Zapata and the Mexican Revolution, published in 1969, on the role Emiliano Zapata played in the Mexican Revolution in the early 20th century.

== Career ==
Following publication of his dissertation as a book, Womack was hired as an assistant professor of Latin American history at Harvard University. In 1970, Zapata and the Mexican Revolution was nominated for a National Book Award, and Harvard named him the Robert Woods Bliss Chair in Latin American History, a position first held by Clarence Haring.

Womack has focused on the modern histories of Cuba, Mexico, and Colombia, and has been a leader in academic research on agrarian, industrial, and labor history in Latin America. Following publication of his work on Zapata, which inspired many other scholars to pursue projects on grassroots rural history, he shifted his focus to urban working-class history.

In 1978, he published an article in the journal Marxist Perspectives on the Mexican economy during the Mexican Revolution. He authored an article for the Cambridge History of Latin America, which was anthologized in Mexico Since Independence.

In 1999, he published an article on the Moctezuma beer brewery. In 2005, he published a long article assessing the state of labor history for the Journal of the Historical Society. His 1999 anthology of documents Rebellion in Chiapas: An Historical Reader places the Chiapas struggle in a historical perspective back to the 16th century.

On November 21, 2009, Womack received the 1808 Medal from the city government of Mexico City, which he in turn awarded to the Mexican Union of Electricians, saying: "My infinite respect for the ability of Mexicans to transform in benefit of the majority their moments of crisis. Such conviction moves me to give honor and deliver this medal to the most important, most courageous organization that took form in this city during the revolutionary wars at the beginning of the last century, the Mexican Union of Electricians".

In 2013, he was interviewed for the movie Viva Zapata "In Mexico, for complicated, still largely unexamined historical reasons, the exploited classes cannot count on politicians or intellectuals for guidance to overthrow the systems of exploitation, centered in New York, proliferated into centers in Mexico, concentrated, of course in Mexico City. Like the people in Morelos, 1900–1911, the exploited have to figure out for themselves, not trusting the politicians they know whatever they howl, whatever they promise."

== Personal life ==
Womack befriended filmmaker Terrence Malick, a fellow Oklahoma native, when they were both Rhodes Scholars, and he appeared in a brief role in Malick's 1973 film Badlands.

Womack is the maternal grandfather of late rapper Lil Peep.

== Publications ==
- Womack, John (2023). Olney, Peter; Perušek, Glenn (eds.). Labor Power and Strategy. Sunderland: PM Press. ISBN 9781629639741.
- Womack, John (2005). "Doing Labor History: Feelings, Work, Material Power". Journal of the Historical Society. 5 (3): 255–296. doi:10.1111/j.1540-5923.2005.00131.x.
- Womack, John (1999). Rebellion in Chiapas: An Historical Reader. New York: The New Press. ISBN 9781565844520.
- Zapata and the Mexican Revolution Vintage (1969) ISBN 0-394-70853-9
- Zapata and the Mexican Revolution (1968)
- Oklahoma’s Green Corn Rebellion: The Importance of Fools. Harvard, senior thesis (1959)
- Emiliano Zapata and the Revolution in Morelos, 1910-1920. Harvard, Ph.D. dissertation (1966)
- Womack, John (2011). The Revolution That Wasn't: Mexico, 1910-1920. New York: The New Press. ISBN 9781595586469.
