= Star Shopping =

2015 song by Lil Peep

Single by Lil Peep
- Released: Aug 17, 2015 (original release), April 19, 2019 (re-release)
- Recorded: 2015
- Genre: Emo rap; cloud rap; alternative R&B; dream pop
- Length: 2:22
- Label: AWAL
- Songwriters: Gustav Åhr; Cabe Brown II; Joe Corrales
- Producer: Kryptik

Lil Peep singles chronology
"I've Been Waiting" (2019)	"Star Shopping" (2015)	"Falling Down (Travis Barker Remix)" (2019)

"Star Shopping" is a song by American rapper Lil Peep. It was first released via SoundCloud in 2015 and officially released to streaming services on April 19, 2019. Produced by Kryptik, the song contains a sample of "Never Mess With Sunday" by Yppah. Despite never charting on the Billboard Hot 100, "Star Shopping" was certified 5× platinum by the Recording Industry Association of America (RIAA) for sales of over five million copies.

== Background ==
Lil Peep had struck a friendship with Kryptik and bought the beat, which was titled "star shopping", from Traktrain. On August 16, 2015, after returning from a trip to Cambridge, Massachusetts for his grandfather's birthday on the previous day, Peep had a long argument with his girlfriend Emma Harris via text messages. He then composed "Star Shopping", a song about him and Emma, writing the lyrics in the Notes app on his phone that day. His mother Liza Womack wrote in a statement relating to the song's re-release, "The song wasn't uploaded to SoundCloud until December of that year. That was Gus's big song, as he got many views and likes on it right away–20k in 24 hours, and over a hundred thousand in a week. He was very excited about that." The song was initially removed from most streaming platforms due to sample clearance issues. It was re-released to streaming services on April 19, 2019, two years after Lil Peep's death, through his eponymous imprint.

== Composition ==
An emo rap, cloud rap, alternative R&B and dream pop song, it contains acoustic guitar chords and echoed vocals, while the lyrics focus on a complicated relationship. Peep begins the song telling his girlfriend to "wait right here" and sings about his strong affection for her, as well as that he is working to become "important" for her.

== Critical reception ==
Rhian Daly of NME considered "Star Shopping" one of Lil Peep's best songs, describing it as "haunting" and Lil Peep's voice as "echoing like he's watching the night sky from a cavernous vantage-point."

== Certifications ==
Certifications for "Star Shopping"
Region	Certification	Certified units/sales
Australia (ARIA)	6× Platinum	420,000^{‡}
Denmark (IFPI Danmark)	Gold	45,000^{‡}
France (SNEP)	Gold	100,000^{‡}
Italy (FIMI)	Gold	50,000^{‡}
New Zealand (RMNZ)	3× Platinum	90,000^{‡}
Spain (Promusicae)	Gold	30,000^{‡}
United Kingdom (BPI)	Platinum	600,000^{‡}
United States (RIAA)	5× Platinum	5,000,000^{‡}
^{‡} Sales+streaming figures based on certification alone.
