= Crybaby (Lil Peep mixtape) =

Mixtape by Lil Peep
- Released: June 10, 2016
- Recorded: April – Jun
- Genres: Emo rap; hip-hop; dream pop; rock
- Length: 31:31
- Label: Self-released (re-released under AUTNMY via AWAL)

Lil Peep chronology
Dead Broke (2016)	Crybaby (2016)	Teen Romance (2016)

Singles from Crybaby
- 1. "Nineteen" Released: April 15, 2016; 2. "Ghost Girl" Released: May 1, 2016; 3. "White Tee" Released: May 17, 2016; 4. "Driveway" Released: May 25, 2016; 5. "Absolute in Doubt" Released: June 10, 2017

Lil Peep mixtape chronology
Live Forever (2015)	Crybaby (2016)	Hellboy (2016)

Professional ratings
Review scores
Source	Rating
AllMusic	4/5 stars

Crybaby is the fourth mixtape by American rapper Lil Peep. It was released on June 10, 2016, independently and later posthumously re-released to streaming platforms on June 10, 2020, by AUTNMY via AWAL with 10 of the original 11 tracks.

== Track listing ==
Credits adapted from Genius and Lil Peep's estate's website.

Crybaby track listing
No.	Title	Writer(s)	Producer(s)	Length
1.	"Crybaby"	Gustav Åhr; Sherif Rashed; Brian Marc Lane; Jesse Thomas Lacey	Lederrick; Lil Peep	4:07
2.	"Lil Jeep"	Åhr; Cian Patterson; Jacques Robert Siroul	Cian P	3:23
3.	"Yesterday"	Åhr; Charlie Shuffler; Noel Gallagher	Charlie Shuffler	1:52
4.	"Absolute in Doubt" (featuring Wicca Phase Springs Eternal)	Åhr; Adam McIlwee; Joseph Cavallo	Foxwedding	3:47
5.	"Ghost Girl"	Åhr; Rashed; Marcus Eoin Sandison; Michael Sandison	Lederrick	2:53
6.	"Big City Blues" (featuring Cold Hart)	Åhr; Jerick Quilisadio; Shuffler; Kholmogortsev Mark Igorevich	Charlie Shuffler	2:35
7.	"Skyscrapers (Love Now, Cry Later)"	Åhr; Quilisadio; Benjamin Gibbard; Christopher Walla	Jayyeah	2:01
8.	"Falling 4 Me"	Åhr; Rashed; Christopher Thorne	Lederrick; Horse Head	3:28
9.	"Nineteen"	Åhr; Dylan Mullen; Isaac Brock; Jeremiah Green; Eric Judy	Smokeasac	2:57
10.	"White Tee" (with Lil Tracy)	Åhr; Jazz Butler; Braden Morgan; Gibbard; Jimmy Tamborello	Nedarb	2:12
11.	"Driveway"	Åhr; Mullen; Brian Joseph Blake; Kyle Kenneth Fasel; Eric Phelps Haines; David Edward Knox; Daniel Lambton	Smokeasac	2:39
Total length:				31:58

Notes

- All songs are stylized in all lowercase. For example, "Crybaby" is stylized as "crybaby".
- "Falling 4 Me" is not included in the 2020 rerelease of the mixtape due to sample clearance issues.
- "Crybaby" samples "The No Seatbelt Song" by Brand New.
- "Lil Jeep" samples "Two People" by Jacques Siroul.
- "Yesterday" samples "Wonderwall" by Oasis.
- "Ghost Girl" samples "In the Annexe" by Boards of Canada.
- "Big City Blues" contains elements from "Tired Guitars" by Kholmogortsev Mark Igorevich.
- "Skyscrapers (Love Now, Cry Later)" samples "Brothers on a Hotel Bed" by Death Cab for Cutie.
- "Falling 4 Me" samples "Climbing Up the Walls" by Radiohead. This sample is absent on the 2026 re-release of the mixtape.
- "Nineteen" samples "Broke" by Modest Mouse.
- "White Tee" samples "Such Great Heights" by The Postal Service.
- "Driveway" samples "I've Given Up on You" by Real Friends.

== Charts ==
Chart performance for Crybaby
Chart (2020)	Peak position
Austrian Albums (Ö3 Austria)	45
Belgian Albums (Ultratop Flanders)	107
German Albums (Offizielle Top 100)	51
New Zealand Albums (RMNZ)	36

2023–2024 chart performance for Crybaby
Chart (2023–2024)	Peak position
Australian Vinyl Albums (ARIA)	6
Belgian Albums (Ultratop Flanders)	38
Polish Albums (ZPAV)	77
UK R&B Albums (Official Charts)	30
US Billboard 200	102

== Certifications ==
Certifications for Crybaby
Region	Certification	Certified units/sales
New Zealand (RMNZ)	Gold	7,500^{‡}
United Kingdom (BPI)	Silver	60,000^{‡}
United States (RIAA)	Gold	500,000^{‡}
^{‡} Sales+streaming figures based on certification alone.
