= 4 Gold Chains =

Single by Lil Peep featuring Clams Casino
- Released: May 14, 2018
- Recorded: May 2017
- Genre: Emo rap
- Length: 3:29
- Label: First Access; Columbia
- Songwriter(s): Gustav Åhr; Michael Volpe
- Producer(s): Clams Casino

Lil Peep singles chronology
"Spotlight" (2018)	"4 Gold Chains" (2018)	"Falling Down" (2018)

Clams Casino singles chronology
"Vampire Knight" (2018)	"4 Gold Chains" (2018)	"Can't Get Over You" (2018)

Music video
- "4 Gold Chains" on YouTube

"4 Gold Chains" is a song by American rapper Lil Peep. It features production by American record producer Clams Casino and was released on May 14, 2018, by First Access Entertainment and Columbia Records.

It was named a "Best new track" by Pitchfork. The song is the rapper's second posthumous single as the lead artist, following up his Marshmello collaboration "Spotlight" from January of the same year.

== Release and promotion ==
Lil Peep released a teaser video on his official Facebook account on May 28, 2017, featuring a snippet of the song with the caption "clams casino". Peep continued to tease the collaboration with Clams Casino on his Twitter account on November 15, 2017, saying it was "next".

On May 10, 2018, Casino posted an image of Peep's aforementioned tweet on his Instagram, hinting that the song would soon be released. A clip of the music video was posted on Peep's Instagram account the next day, also revealing the song's release date. On May 13, the song and music video were premiered by American singer-songwriter, and close friend of Peep's, Post Malone, while performing at the Rolling Loud Music Festival in Miami, Florida.

== Music video ==
A music video was released on May 13, 2018, to accompany the release of the track. It was filmed in May 2017 in London, England in one shot, directed by Peep himself and videographer Heavy Rayn, and edited by Mezzy. Peep loved the idea of one-shot videos and also shot the music video for "When I Lie" from the then unreleased EP Goth Angel Sinner while on tour in Germany in one take.
