= ILoveMakonnen =

American rapper and singer (born 1989)

iLoveMakonnen
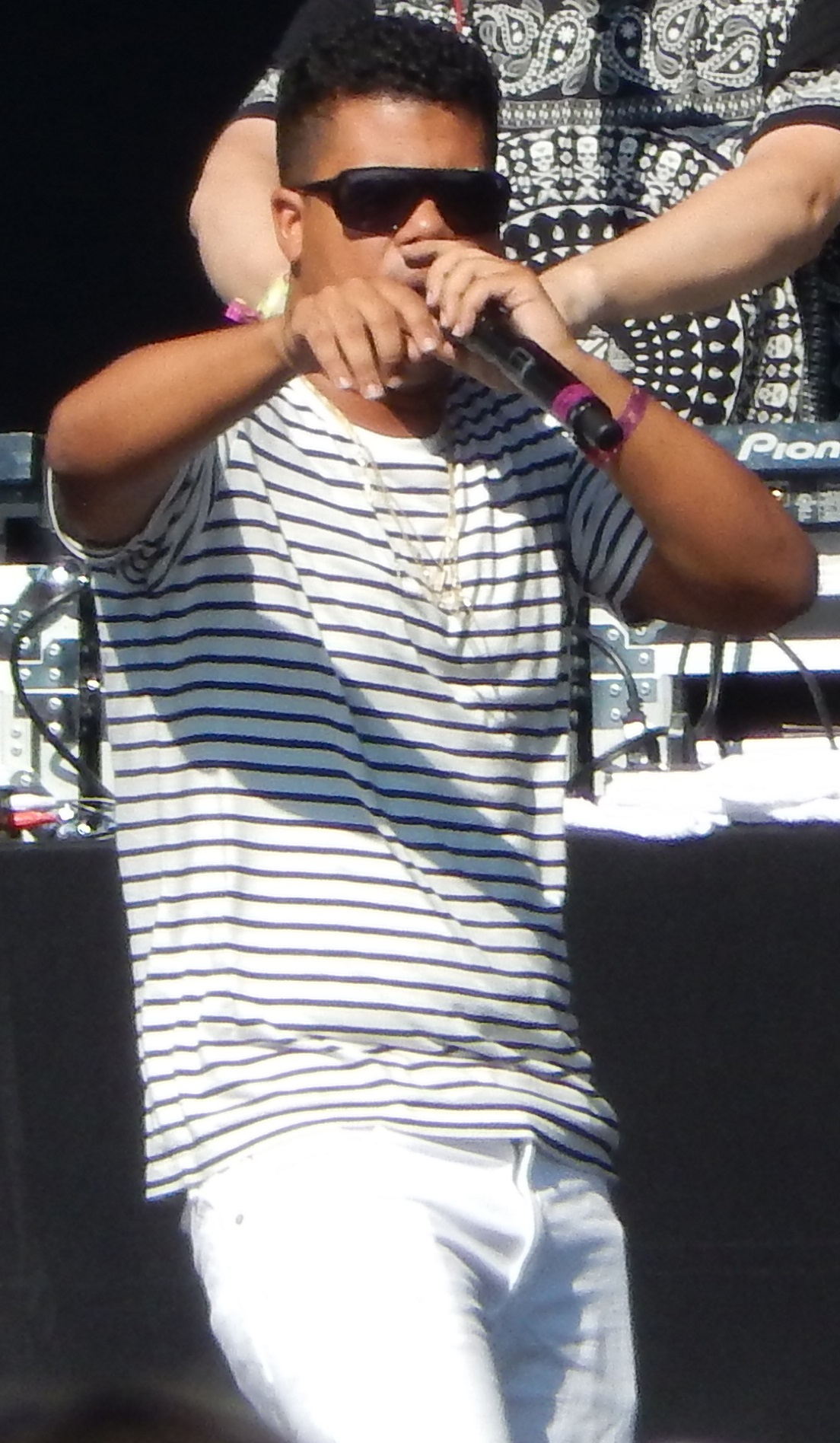
- ILoveMakonnen performing in Chicago, 2015

Background information
- Also known as: Makonnen Danny Morris
- Born: Makonnen Kamali Sheran; April 12, 1989 (age 37); Los Angeles, California, U.S.
- Origin: Atlanta, Georgia, U.S.
- Genres: Hip-hop; R&B
- Occupations: Rapper; record producer; singer; songwriter
- Years active: 2008–present
- Labels: Warner; OVO Sound; Too Lost
- Website: ilovemakonnen.com

Makonnen Kamali Sheran (born April 12, 1989), better known by his stage name iLoveMakonnen (often stylized in all caps), is an American rapper and singer. He is best known for his 2014 single "Tuesday", which gained recognition following its remix with Canadian rapper Drake. After its release in August of that year, he signed with Drake's record label OVO Sound, an imprint of Warner Records that same month; the song was re-released by the label shortly after and subsequently peaked at number 12 on the Billboard Hot 100. "Tuesday" was also nominated for Best Rap/Sung Collaboration at the 57th Annual Grammy Awards, and served as the lead single for his likewise re-issued self-titled debut extended play (2014), which peaked at number 72 on the Billboard 200. He would later release a sequel, alongside two mixtapes (one with Rich the Kid), on the label, before parting ways with OVO in 2016.

Since leaving OVO, less of his releases have garnered similar success. After setting priorities with Warner Records, he release the mixtape Drink More Water 6, which gained decent chart success, peaking at number 25 on the Top Rap Albums chart. He would later go on to write "Falling Down", a collaboration between frequent collaborator Lil Peep and XXXTentacion, with the song peaking at number 13 on the Billboard Hot 100 and becoming a worldwide success. The original version with Makonnen, "Sunlight On Your Skin", was also released, with another collaboration, "I've Been Waiting" (with Fall Out Boy), peaking at number 62 on the Billboard Hot 100. He would eventually release the album Diamonds with Peep in 2023. He has also collaborated with artists such as 21 Savage, Post Malone, Juice Wrld, Lil Yachty, Ty Dolla Sign, Gucci Mane, Wiz Khalifa, YoungBoy Never Broke Again, Rae Sremmurd, Mike Will Made It, Metro Boomin, Mustard, Sonny Digital, Skepta, Santigold, Steve Aoki, and Yung Lean.

== Early life ==
Makonnen Kamali Sheran was born on April 12, 1989, in South Los Angeles, California, and was named after Makonnen Wolde Mikael, father of Tafari Makonnen who was later crowned as Ethiopian Emperor Haile Selassie I. His father is a first generation immigrant from Belize who worked as an electrician and his mother was a nail instructor who worked in the beauty business for over 30 years. In an interview, he described himself as mixed with African American, Indian, Irish, Belgian, German and Chinese heritage. Growing up in Los Angeles, he moved to the Atlanta area when he was 13 years old, due to his parents' divorce. There, he witnessed the death of a close friend in his senior year in high school.

== Career ==
=== 2008–2013: Career beginnings ===
"I was hanging out with drug dealers and thieves and the pretty girls that were popular. The kids thought I was kind of bad. Not reckless, but a badass. A lot of people really look up to me. I kind of represent them. It's like, they'll stand behind me, but they won't stand beside me."

— ILoveMakonnen in an interview with journalist Naomi Zeichner from BuzzFeed magazine in August 2014.

Makonnen started making songs on his computer and uploading them to MySpace. On this website, he met rising musicians, such as Adele. Makonnen also created a blog, where he would post interviews with musicians such as Lil B and Soulja Boy Tell'em. After a period under house arrest following the fatal accidental shooting of a friend, he enrolled in a cosmetology school and became a part of a group called Phantom Posse. In January 2012, Makonnen met Atlanta producer Mike Will Made It and formed a brief professional relationship with him. However, because of Mike Will's busy schedule, the two were not able to meet often, and soon were separated from each other.

=== 2014: Rise to prominence ===
In March 2014, record producer Mike Will Made It would reply to Makonnen and brought him to the DTP Studios, where he played some of his songs for fellow producer Metro Boomin. Metro instantly liked Makonnen and stayed in touch with him. Later, after recording six songs together, Metro introduced Makonnen to fellow Atlanta producers Sonny Digital and 808 Mafia, who were all unusually impressed with him. Two days later, Makonnen recorded the song, titled "Don't Sell Molly No More" with Sonny Digital, which would later launch his music career. Sonny Digital introduced him to the other Atlanta producers such as DJ Spinz, Dun Deal and St. Louis producer Cammy Recklezz. He started gaining local fame within the community with songs such as "Living on the Southside", "Sneaky Lady" and "My New Friend". Makonnen was then featured on Mike Will's mixtape, titled Ransom.

In July 2014, the singer released his self-titled EP iLoveMakonnen, which included the singles "Tuesday" and "I Don't Sell Molly No More". The latter reached pop singer Miley Cyrus, who shared it on her Instagram. The post got over 210,000 likes and counting, that brought a lot of new fans to Makonnen. On August 15, 2014, Vice included his song "Whip It" in their Staff Picks for the Week list, commenting: "Makonnen's voice is incredible! ... How could you not have a good time listening to this song? If there is anyone I trust to teach me how to whip it, it is definitely my friend Makonnen."

In August 2014, after hearing "Tuesday", Drake asked one of the song's producers, Sonny Digital, if he could remix the song. Makonnen agreed to send it to Drake, but didn't think much of it. However, two days later Drake released a remix. Makonnen later commented: "Yeah, I surprised. Shocking. Drake listens to Makonnen. It was great. I was excited. Surprised, shocked. Just overwhelmed." The remix, simply titled "Tuesday" went viral and led to increased media interest in iLoveMakonnen. That same month, Makonnen was featured in XXL's The Come Up section, which focuses on new artists. He later stated he was not looking for a major label deal and instead planned to go touring and record music independently: "I'm not too thirsty to sign a deal. Cause a label will really just take all your free music down and you have to be somebody's bitch." On September 1, 2014, it was announced that Makonnen had signed to Drake's label OVO Sound, which is distributed by Warner Bros. Records.

=== 2015–2016: OVO Sound and iLoveMakonnen 2 ===
In an interview with The Fader in December 2015, more than a year after signing to Drake's OVO Sound, Makonnen said the label delayed tracks from iLoveMakonnen 2 from coming out. The song "Second Chance," for example, was finished in January 2015 and intended for a summer release, but ended up being self-released by Makonnen in November 2015. Makonnen said, "Second Chance was supposed to be that summer banger this summer. That was supposed to be out, touching people and hitting them this summer. By the time next year they'll be ready for something else. It's all late. People are doubting me, doubting what the fuck I said when I made the fucking song. You wait a year later and it's whatever. Hopefully, it's worked right. The song is structured properly. Everything is all there for proper radio play to just spin it over and over to people. Who knows? I don't know what the fuck they want."

Makonnen also claimed "extra bullshit in the industry" stopped "Teach Me How To Whip It" and "No Ma'am" from getting radio play. When asked if he still talked to Drake, Makonnen responded, "Here and there. By the time this comes out, I'll probably see him six more times or no more times. I don't know. I just wish everybody well in all that they do and I just go on and live my life and try to uplift motherfuckers. At the end of the day I'm tired of uplifting people. I just gotta uplift myself now because everything else is a waste of time." Makonnen also described the music scene: "There's not even any money here anymore. It's all lies. The money's gone and everybody is now keeping up this front as if there's money there." On February 8, 2016, it was announced that alongside Travis Scott and Vic Mensa, Makonnen would be part of the "Wangsquad", an Alexander Wang campaign.

=== 2016–2019; 2023: Departure from OVO Sound and Lil Peep collaborations ===
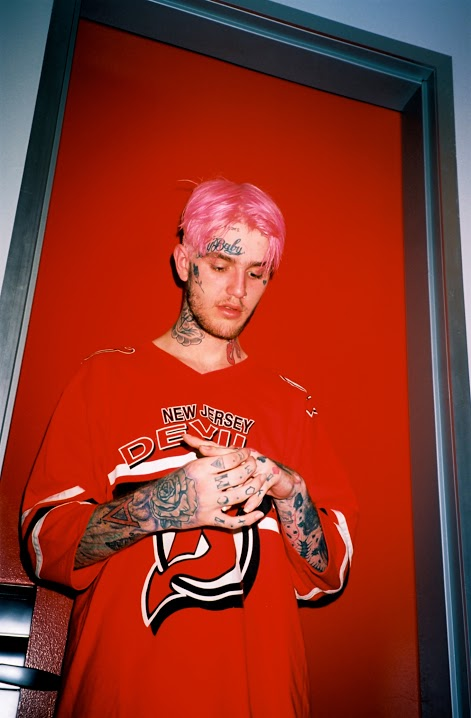
Makonnen has released several posthumous collaborations with Lil Peep (pictured), including the 2023 collaboration album Diamonds, and contributions to the 2018 single "Falling Down" (featuring XXXTentacion).

On April 18, 2016, Makonnen parted ways with Drake's label OVO Sound, saying the "choice to be solely on Warner Bros. Records was the right thing for me and for my best interest." On May 7, 2016, Makonnen announced he would be retiring from music to focus on acting but released a new song shortly after, with confirmation of a new project. In the late summer of 2017, Makonnen collaborated on an album with Lil Peep in London. The album was scrapped after Makonnen leaked it online in May 2020. On August 17, 2018, Makonnen announced a single he co-wrote titled "Falling Down", a reworking of "Sunlight On Your Skin" that he recorded with Peep during the sessions in London. The new version features since deceased rapper XXXTentacion, who recorded his verses following Peep's death. The single was officially released on September 19, 2018. The original "Sunlight On Your Skin" version was released on September 27, 2018.

In 2019, Makonnen released "I've Been Waiting", a collaboration with both Peep and Fall Out Boy. He had previously collaborated with the latter artists on a remix of their song "Favorite Record", which was released on their 2015 remix album Make America Psycho Again. Upon its release, the single charted at number 62 on the Billboard Hot 100, and ultimately peaked at number 12 on both the Czech Republic Airplay chart and the New Zealand Hot Singles chart. The single also charted in Poland and Sweden, and was certified Gold in both the former and Mexico, while being certified Platinum by the Recording Industry Association of America (RIAA) for selling 1,000,000 units. The original version of the song, without Fall Out Boy, was included on the 2019 compilation album Everybody's Everything, which serves as a soundtrack to the film of the same name, which Makonnen appears in. In 2023, the previously scrapped Lil Peep collaboration album, Diamonds, was released, featuring the original version of "I've Been Waiting".

== Personal life ==
On January 20, 2017, via Twitter, Makonnen came out as gay.

== Discography ==
iLoveMakonnen discography
- Studio albums: 2
- EPs: 9
- Mixtapes: 15
- Singles: 10 (4 as featured artist)
- Collaborative albums: 1
- Collaborative EPs: 3
- Collaborative mixtapes: 2

ILoveMakonnen's discography consists of two studio albums, one collaborative album, fifteen mixtapes, two collaborative mixtapes, nine extended plays, three collaborative extended plays, six singles, four featured singles, and sixty-five guest appearances.

=== Studio albums ===
Title	Album details
My Parade	Released: April 16, 2021; Label: Timeless Magic, Cor Tan; Format: Digital download, streaming
Summer '22	Released: August 29, 2022; Label: Self-released; Format: Digital download, streaming

=== Collaborative albums ===
List of collaborative albums, with selected details
Title	Album details
Diamonds (with Lil Peep)	Released: September 8, 2023; Label: AWAL; Formats: Digital download

=== EPs ===
List of extended plays, with selected chart positions, sales figures and certifications
Title	Album details	Peak chart positions	
Title	Album details	US	US R&B /HH
iLoveMakonnen	Released: December 15, 2014; Label: OVO Sound, Warner Bros.; Format: Download	72	48
iLoveMakonnen 2	Released: November 20, 2015; Label: OVO Sound, Warner Bros.; Format: Download	—	40
Fun Summer 17 Vol. 1	Released: June 7, 2017; Label: Self-released; Format: Streaming	—	—
iLoveMakonnen X Ronny J (with Ronny J)	Released: January 24, 2018; Label: Self-released; Format: Streaming	—	—
iLoveAmerica	Released: July 4, 2018; Label: Self-released; Format: Streaming	—	—
M3	Released: June 21, 2019; Label: Warner; Format: Streaming	—	—
Monster in the Woods	Released: October 29, 2021; Label: Self-released; Format: Streaming	—	—
Everything Is Trash (with Yellow Trash Can)	Released: January 14, 2022; Label: Self-released; Format: Streaming	—	—
Stay Hydrated	Released: December 25, 2022; Label: Self-released; Format: Streaming	—	—
NOT MY MAKONNEN	Released: May 9, 2024; Label: Self-released; Format: Streaming	—	—
Inflated Sense of Importance	Released: June 6, 2024; Label: Self-released; Format: Streaming	—	—
Everything Is Fake (with Yellow Trash Can)	Released: March 31, 2026; Label: Self-released; Format: Streaming	—	—
"—" denotes a recording that did not chart or was not released in that territory.

=== Mixtapes ===
List of mixtapes, with year released
Title	Album details	Peak chart positions	
Title	Album details	US R&B/HH	US Rap
3D	Released: 2011; Label: Self-released; Format: Download	—	—
4G	Released: 2011; Label: Self-released; Format: Download	—	—
5	Released: 2011; Label: S.O.D MG; Format: Download	—	—
6	Released: 2011; Label: Self-released; Format: Download	—	—
Holiday Special	Released: 2011; Label: Self-released; Format: Download	—	—
LTE	Released: 2012; Label: Self-released; Format: Download	—	—
A Trillion Light Years	Released: 2012; Label: Self-released; Format: Download	—	—
Drink More Water	Released: 2012; Label: Self-released; Format: Download	—	—
Drink More Water 2	Released: 2013; Label: Self-released; Format: Download	—	—
3 Suns	Released: 2013; Label: Self-released; Format: Download	—	—
Drink More Water 3	Released: 2014; Label: Self-released; Format: Download	—	—
Drink More Water 4	Released: June 30, 2014; Label: Self-released; Format: Download	—	—
Drink More Water 5	Released: March 31, 2015; Label: OVO Sound; Format: Download	—	—
Whip It Up (with Rich the Kid)	Released: November 26, 2015; Label: Rich Forever, OVO Sound; Format: Download	—	—
Drink More Water 6	Released: March 18, 2016; Label: Warner Bros. Records; Format: Download	35	25
Red Trap Dragon (with Danny Wolf)	Released: August 9, 2016; Label: Self-Released; Format: Download	—	—
DMW007	Released: October 6, 2021; Label: Timeless Magic; Format: Streaming & Download	—	—

=== Singles ===
==== As lead artist ====
List of singles, with selected chart positions and certifications, showing year released and album name
Title	Year	Peak chart positions						Certifications	Album
Title	Year	US	US R&B/HH	US R&B	CAN	FRA	NZ Hot	Certifications	Album
"Tuesday" (featuring Drake)	2014	12	1	1	56	86	—	RIAA: Platinum; RMNZ: Gold; RMNZ: Gold (remix)	iLoveMakonnen
"Sellin"	2016	—	—	—	—	—	—		Drink More Water 6
"Side to Side"	2016	—	—	—	—	—	—		Non-album singles
"Love" (featuring Rae Sremmurd)	2017	—	—	—	—	—	—		Non-album singles
"Sunlight On Your Skin" (with Lil Peep)	2018	—	—	—	—	—	36		Come Over When You're Sober, Pt. 2
"I've Been Waiting" (with Lil Peep featuring Fall Out Boy)	2019	62	—	—	—	—	12	RIAA: Gold	Everybody's Everything

==== As featured artist ====
List of singles as a featured artist, showing year released and album name
Title	Year	Peak chart positions		Certifications	Album
Title	Year	US Dance	US Tracks	Certifications	Album
"I Like Tuh" (Carnage featuring iLoveMakonnen)	2015	—	29	RIAA: Gold	Papi Gordo
"How Else" (Steve Aoki featuring Rich the Kid and iLoveMakonnen)	2016	47	—		Steve Aoki Presents Kolony
"Kolony Anthem" (Steve Aoki featuring iLoveMakonnen and Bok Nero)	2017	—	—		Steve Aoki Presents Kolony
"No Friends" (Chase Atlantic featuring iLoveMakonnen and K CAMP)	2017	—	—		Part Three

=== Guest appearances ===
List of guest appearances, with other performing artists, showing year released and album name
Title	Year	Artist(s)	Album
"Nokia"	2014	Father	L1L D1DDY
"Look at Wrist"	2014	Father, Key!	Young Hot Ebony
"Day2Day" (Remix)	2014	Tunji Ige, Michael Christmas	—N/a
"I Understand"	2014	Key!, FKi 1st	Fkeyi
"TMZ"	2014	Key!, Ian Connor, Saucelord Rich	Fkeyi
"FriendsMaybe"	2014	Rome Fortune	Small VVorld
"Wishin You Well"	2014	Mike Will Made-It	—N/a
"Syrup in My Soda"	2014	Mike WiLL Made-It, Riff Raff	—N/a
"Working That"	2014	itsADOLLA	Witness
"Swerve"	2014	Mike WiLL Made-It	Ransom
"Down 4 So Long Remix"	2014	Ezra Koenig, Despot	Red Bull's 20 Before 15 Singles Series
"H.O.M.E."	2015	Trinidad James	No One Is Safe
"Interviews"	2015	Brodinski, Yung Gleesh	Brava
"TrUe Thang"	2015	Rome Fortune, CeeJ	loloU
"Take Me Away"	2015	Rome Fortune	loloU
"Why'd You Call"	2015	DJ Mustard, Ty Dolla Sign	—N/a
"Myself"	2015	Yung Lean	—N/a
"Slaughter Ya Daughter"	2015	21 Savage, Key!	The Slaughter Tape
"Pussy Money Dope"	2015	Keith Jenkins, Lil B	Black Bart 2
"All Black Hummers"	2015	Father, Archibald Slim, Ethereal	Papicodone
"Leave It There"	2015	DJ Holiday	God Bless
"I Like Tuh"	2015	Carnage	Papi Gordo
"Tequila"	2015	Migos, Rich the Kid	Streets On Lock 3
"Favorite Record (Remix)"	2015	Fall Out Boy	Make America Psycho Again
"Who Be Lovin' Me"	2016	Santigold	99¢
"Why Don't U"	2016	Father, Abra	I'm a Piece of Shit
"Party on Me"	2016	Father, Ethereal	I'm a Piece of Shit
"Park Hill"	2016	Povi	—N/a
"Thru It All" (Remix)	2016	Wintertime	I Know What You Did Last Winter
"Take it Easy"	2016	Gucci Mane	Meal Ticket
"Cash Cash"	2016	Gucci Mane	Meal Ticket
"Forever"	2016	FKi 1st	First Time for Everything (Part 1)
"Coming Soon"	2016	Skepta, Céon	—N/a
"Feel the Same"	2016	Phantom Posse	Be True
"Love It"	2016	Sonny Digital, Key!	—N/a
"Lit"	2016	Rome Fortune	VVORLDVVIDE PIMPSTATION
"My Boy Band 'Exortion'"	2016	Rome Fortune, Nevabitch	VVORLDVVIDE PIMPSTATION
"Look at Wrist (TrapMoneyBenny Remix)"	2016	TrapMoneyBenny, Key!, Father	#TrapMoneyBenny
"All Alone"	2016	Nick Hook	Relationships
"I'll Be Damned"	2016	Hoodrich Pablo Juan, Lil Yachty	—N/a
"Taylor Swift"	2017	Trinidad James, Peewee Longway	The Wake Up 2
"Global"	2017	Lil B	Black Ken
"Romantic"	2017	Key!	—N/a
"Drop the Top"	2017	Teddy	—N/a
"4 Real"	2017	Destructo, Ty Dolla Sign	Renegade
"No Friends"	2017	Chase Atlantic, K CAMP	Part Three
"Kolony Anthem"	2017	Steve Aoki, Bok Nero	Steve Aoki Presents Kolony
"How Else"	2017	Steve Aoki, Rich the Kid	Steve Aoki Presents Kolony
"How Else (David Guetta Remix)"	2017	Steve Aoki, Rich the Kid, David Guetta	Steve Aoki Presents Kolony (Japanese Edition)
"How Else (Kayzo Remix)"	2017	Steve Aoki, Rich the Kid, Kayzo	Steve Aoki Presents Kolony (Japanese Edition)
"How Else (Late Remix)"	2017	Steve Aoki, Rich the Kid, Late	Steve Aoki Presents Kolony (Japanese Edition)
"Molly and Xans"	2017	Learic Spellman	Maturation
"4AM"	2017	Huntar	Your Favourite Worst Mistake
"Kolony Anthem (Remix)"	2017	Steve Aoki, Bok Nero, Mike Cervello	Steve Aoki Presents Kolony (Remixes)
"I Got Work"	2017	P.S. 211	—N/a
"#WhatIWasLookingFor"	2018	na$karmoney	#FreeNaskar
"Long Time"	2018	Naations	Teardrop
"Cupid!"	2019	Teddy	—N/a
"I've Been Waiting (Original)"	2019	Lil Peep	Everybody's Everything
"Lovin U"	2019	Curtis Williams, Reo Cragun	i have so much to tell you
"Changing"	2020	Phantom Posse	Forever Underground
"Sick!"	2021	BAYLI	—N/a
"Next To Me"	2021	Ares Carter	—N/a
"PLASTIC"	2022	Pussy Riot	MATRIARCHY NOW
"Hellbound"	2022	Teddy	Tales of Euphoria
"Now That You're Leaving"	2023	Teddy	—N/a
"High horse freestyle"	2023	Konnen Springtime	After Land
"Can't Stop Won't Stop"	2024	SinceWhen, Brennen Savage, Lil Tracy	Begin, Again
"Raining like Portland"	2024	Yellow Trash Can	SOGGY
"Don't rush"	2024	Yellow Trash Can, Myke Bogan	SOGGY and Pee After Sex
"We On Whitney"	2025	Key!, YEO CIG	Eye Feel Free
"Everybody Fiendin"	2025	Bocha, Jitta On The Track, Yellow Trash Can	HOOLIGAN
"YAYAYA"	2025	Myke Bogan	Text me when he leaves
'DUSTLESS COFFIN"	2025	Earl from Yonder	THE WELLNESS CHECK
"GET AWAY"	2025	Keshon Campbell	TELL ME WHERE TO FIND YOUR HEART
"IS IT TRUE?"	2026	Yellow Trash Can, Key!, Jitta On The Track	KINDA SOBER, Vol. 1

== Filmography ==
Year	Title	Role	Ref.
2019	Everybody's Everything	Himself	
2021	Juice Wrld: Into the Abyss	Himself	
