= Witchblades =

Song by Lil Peep and Lil Tracy

from the EP Castles II and the album Everybody's Everything
- Released: February 6, 2017
- Recorded: 2017
- Label: Death Note Music; Autnmy
- Songwriters: Barry Stock; Brad Walst; Brendan Murray; Cody Littlefield; Gavin Brown; Gustav Åhr; Jazz Butler; Matt Walst; Neil Sanderson
- Producers: Yung Cortex; Bighead

Music video
- "Witchblades" on YouTube

"Witchblades" (stylized in all lowercase) is a song by American rappers Lil Peep and Lil Tracy, released on February 6, 2017, as a track off their collaborative extended play (EP) Castles II (2017) and the former's compilation album Everybody's Everything (2019). The production was handled by Yung Cortex and Bighead. It would peak at number eighteen on the NZ Hot Singles chart and be certified platinum by the Recording Industry Association of America (RIAA).

== Background and composition ==
"Witchblades" was released on February 6, 2017, alongside Lil Peep and Lil Tracy's collaborative extended play (EP) Castles II. It was re-released on November 15, 2019, on all streaming platforms as part of the compilation album Everybody's Everything. The themes of the song is the celebration of being an outsider. The music video for "Witchblades" was directed by Metro Blu, and has an ambience similar to a VHS tape. "Witchblades" samples the song "The Real You" by Three Days Grace. In an interview with Genius, Bighead, the producer of the track, explained that Lil Peep didn't want another guitar beat, which led him to find and use the Three Days Grace sample.

== Charts ==
Chart performance for "Witchblades"
Chart (2021)	Peak position
New Zealand Hot Singles (RMNZ)	18

== Certifications and sales ==
Region	Certification	Certified units/sales
New Zealand (RMNZ)	Gold	15,000^{‡}
United Kingdom (BPI)	Silver	200,000^{‡}
United States (RIAA)	Platinum	1,000,000^{‡}
^{‡} Sales+streaming figures based on certification alone.
