= Falling Down (Lil Peep and XXXTentacion song) =

2018 single by Lil Peep and XXXTentacion

Single by Lil Peep and XXXTentacion

from the album Come Over When You're Sober, Pt. 2
- Released: September 19, 2018
- Recorded: 2017–2018
- Genre: Emo pop; alternative rock
- Length: 3:18
- Label: AUTNMY; Columbia
- Songwriters: Gustav Åhr; Jahseh Onfroy; Makonnen Sheran
- Producers: IIVI; John Cunningham; Blue Cheeze; Mike Will Made It^{[co.]}

Lil Peep singles chronology
"4 Gold Chains" (2018)	"Falling Down" (2018)	"Sunlight on Your Skin" (2018)

XXXTentacion singles chronology
"Moonlight" (2018)	"Falling Down" (2018)	"Arms Around You" (2018)

"Falling Down" is a song by American rappers and singers Lil Peep and XXXTentacion. It was included as a bonus track on the deluxe edition of the former's second studio album Come Over When You're Sober, Pt. 2 (2018). The song was posthumously released as the lead single from the album on September 19, 2018. The track was produced by IIVI, John Cunningham, and Mike Will Made It. "Falling Down" was originally a song by and written by Lil Peep and fellow American rapper and singer iLoveMakonnen under the title "Sunlight on Your Skin", with XXXTentacion also receiving a writing credit for the final version.

Following Peep's death from a Fentanyl–Xanax overdose, X encountered a snippet of the song on YouTube and contacted iLoveMakonnen to record a verse for it. This new version peaked at number thirteen on the U.S. Billboard Hot 100 chart, becoming Lil Peep's highest-charting single in the United States. The single has since been certified three-times Platinum by the Recording Industry Association of America (RIAA).

The song reached number one in Estonia, Finland, Latvia, Lithuania, New Zealand, Norway, and Sweden. It reached the top ten in a total of 17 countries, including the United Kingdom.

== Background ==
"Falling Down" was originally recorded as "Sunlight on Your Skin" during a London studio session between iLoveMakonnen and Lil Peep as part of the collaboration project Diamonds. The producer claimed the lyrics "Let's watch the rain while it's falling down" was described that at the time Lil Peep recorded the song, it was pouring outside. On November 15, 2017, Lil Peep died from an accidental Fentanyl–Xanax overdose, leaving the project unfinished. It was later omitted when the project released in 2018. The song was played on livestream by iLoveMakonnen following his death and then was uploaded to YouTube as a snippet, where XXXTentacion heard it.

XXXTentacion had not met iLoveMakonnen in person, but he did once speak with him over the phone in late 2016 when he was in prison dealing with aggravated battery charges. XXXTentacion contacted iLoveMakonnen and recorded a verse over Makonnen's in tribute of Lil Peep. X is quoted as saying that if he had seen the better side of Peep before he died then they would have been good friends. XXXTentacion was murdered on June 18, 2018.

== Release and promotion ==
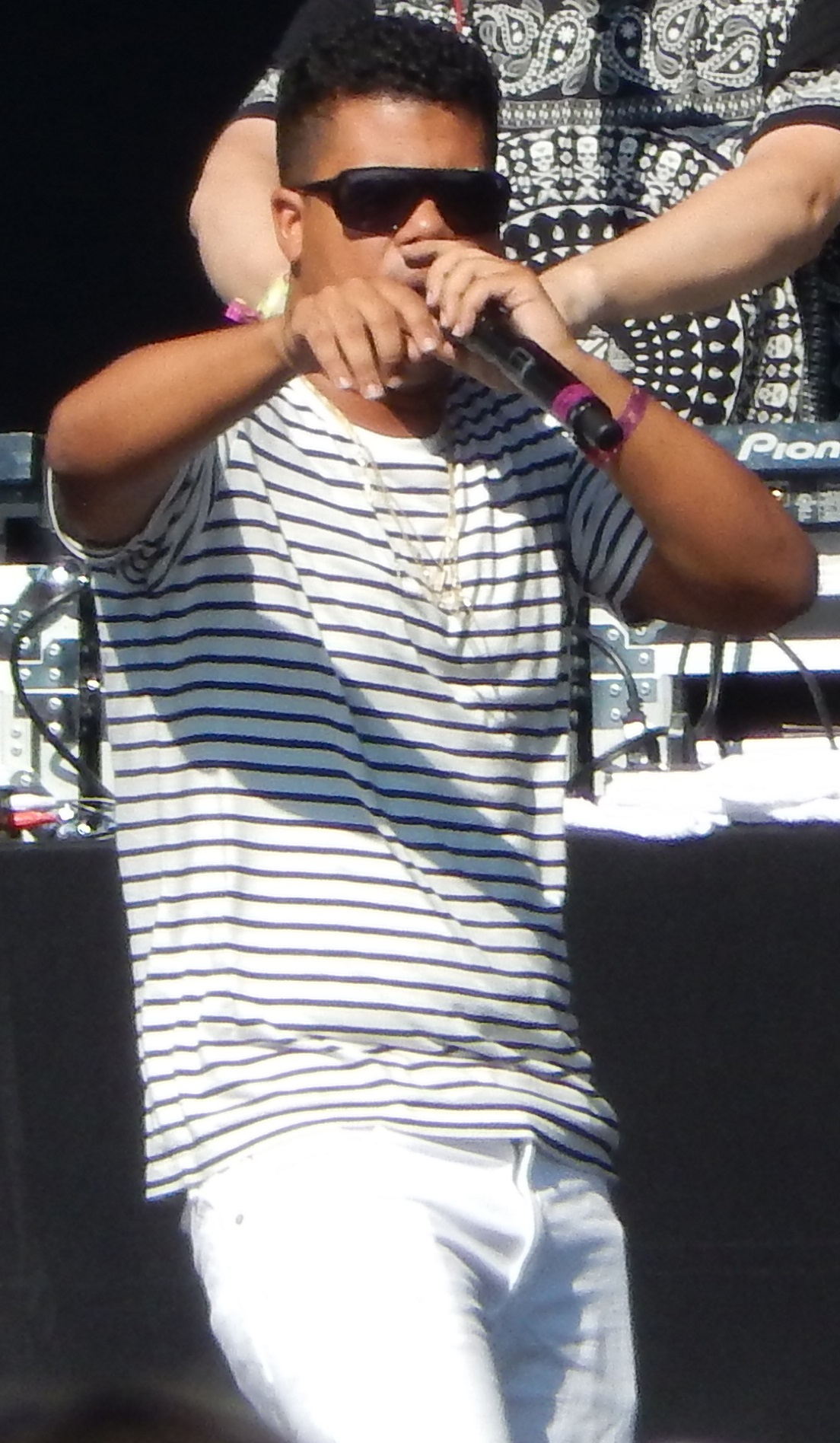
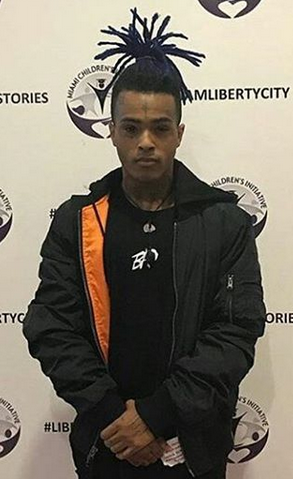
The original version of the collaborative song featured singer iLoveMakonnen (left). The final version featured rapper and singer XXXTentacion (right).

The song was released on September 19, 2018, after a long delay, being announced by Lil Peep's and XXXTentacion's mothers. XXXTentacion's mother, Cleopatra Bernard, uploaded the preview on Instagram, captioning it with "From Peep's mom and I" with Makonnen claiming it was the mothers' wishes. "Sunlight on Your Skin" was also released as a single on September 27, 2018.

=== Controversy ===
While the single became a commercial success, its initial announcement was met by controversy among some of Lil Peep's friends and fans, many of whom were upset regarding the inclusion of XXXTentacion. Leading up to his own death, XXXTentacion had accrued an alleged history of violence. Moreover, at the time of the posthumous collaboration, XXXTentacion was facing multiple domestic abuse charges. This indicated to some that despite sharing similar musical tastes, his values ran counter to those lived by Lil Peep, though friends of Lil Peep said that he enjoyed XXXTentacion's music.

Lil Peep and XXXTentacion's attitudes towards each other while Lil Peep was alive have been described as murky. Fish Narc, a producer who is part of GothBoiClique, opposed XXXTentacion's inclusion on the song. In August 2018, Fish Narc posted a story onto Instagram in which he disavowed the collaboration. He stated, "[Lil Peep] explicitly rejected Triple X for his abuse of women, spent time and money getting Triple X's songs removed from his Spotify playlists, and wouldn't have co-signed that song. Don't listen to it." Fish Narc's claims of Lil Peep rejecting associations with XXXTentacion have not been substantiated. Likewise, one of Lil Peep's closest collaborators, Lil Tracy, said that the two artists were "never even friends [and] didn't even like each other.. RIP to both of them." On the contrary, rapper Fat Nick, a mutual friend of Lil Peep and XXXTentacion, said on Twitter that right before Lil Peep died, he and Lil Peep had a conversation about XXXTentacion and had planned to meet up with him, and that XXXTentacion was "super happy about it". Fat Nick also spoke about the matter on an Instagram livestream, where he dismissed the claims from Fish Narc and others about tension between XXXTentacion and Lil Peep, and confirmed that Lil Peep wanted to meet XXXTentacion once he was off tour. In the livestream, he also implied that members of GothBoiClique were responsible for Lil Peep's death, saying, "Some of y'all are siding with the people that took advantage of Peep. I don't get it... That's crazy. Y'all say shit about fucking X, but you're not saying shit about the people that killed [Lil Peep]... The people that gave him fentanyl. Y'all don't say shit to them." After this, Fish Narc faced criticism for his initial statement condemning the song. Fish Narc responded on Twitter, "I feel that people think I am trying to insult X. But really I wish him rest. I protest a posthumous collab between unaffiliated artists," and clarified that he did not wish to attack XXXTentacion and that his comments were, "how I interpreted what Peep told me as a friend." Following the release of the song, Fish Narc and Lil Tracy retracted their initial statements, with Fish Narc stating that his original stance was "what [he] said in anger".

During an interview with XXL, Makonnen defended his decision to include XXXTentacion, saying, "If Lil Peep was alive, and me and Peep are friends, and I guess I can speak for Lil Peep since it's our project together, I would say that we would be very open to talking with whoever and to making any sort of creative things happen." Makonnen mentioned the role that Lil Peep and XXXTentacion's mothers had in conception of the song. He said, "I definitely think it was like the mothers' wish. [XXXTentacion] had just been tragically taken away and Peep passed away as well. I think it's something both the mothers have in common. The mothers have the final say because these are their children at the end of the day." In August 2018, Lil Peep's mother, Liza Womack responded to a fan's concerns on Instagram, stating that releasing the song with XXXTentacion added onto to it was "Makonnen's choice" and not hers. However, she later relented after speaking with XXXTentacion's mother, Cleopatra Bernard. Womack also joined Bernard in receiving the Platinum plaques for "Falling Down" on Lil Peep and XXXTentacion's behalf. The rights to Lil Peep's unreleased music are owned by Columbia Records. One month following the release of "Falling Down," transcripts of XXXTentacion allegedly confessing to some of his charges were revealed to the public. According to the Miami-Dade County State Attorney's office, the tape was considered a confession by both the prosecution and XXXTentacion's defense. In an interview with The Fader, when Makonnen was asked if his perception of "Falling Down" had been changed by the news, he demurred by saying, "I don't know anything about that."

== Critical reception ==
Rolling Stone writer Charles Holmes stated, "Lil Peep and XXXTentacion's "Falling Down" ... is a controversial, convoluted and potentially cathartic release, depending on your vantage point." Jami Tabberer of Gay Star News remarked, "the guest artist on wistful bonus track Falling Down will give some LGBTIs pause for thought. The late XXXTentacion, who was murdered in July [sic], (Note: XXXTentacion was murdered in June 2018. Tabberer incorrectly stated that it was in July.) was of course flagrantly homophobic. Lil Peep brings something gentle and searching out in him on thus bonus track, as two lost souls struggle to decipher their pain ... Listening to it with hindsight is devastating." Contradicting Tabberer's assertion, XXXTentacion had stated in interviews that he was not homophobic, and had previously declared his support for LGBT rights and condemned homophobia from hate groups. Writing for The New York Times, Jon Caramanica called the song "undercooked," describing it as "a light-touch recording he made over a snippet of Lil Peep's music."

== Charts ==
=== Weekly charts ===
Weekly chart performance
Chart (2018)	Peak position
Australia (ARIA)	7
Austria (Ö3 Austria Top 40)	10
Belgium (Ultratop 50 Flanders)	43
Belgium (Ultratip Bubbling Under Wallonia)	11
Canada Hot 100 (Billboard)	5
Czech Republic Singles Digital (ČNS IFPI)	3
Denmark (Tracklisten)	5
Estonia (IFPI)	1
Finland (Suomen virallinen lista)	1
Finland Airplay (Radiosoittolista)	68
France (SNEP)	48
Germany (GfK)	12
Hungary (Single Top 40)	10
Hungary (Stream Top 40)	2
Ireland (IRMA)	9
Italy (FIMI)	29
Latvia (LAIPA)	1
Lithuania (AGATA)	1
Netherlands (Single Top 100)	24
New Zealand (Recorded Music NZ)	1
New Zealand Hot Singles (RMNZ) Sunlight on Your Skin	36
Norway (VG-lista)	1
Portugal (AFP)	6
Russia Airplay (Tophit)	11
Scottish Singles Sales (Official Charts)	76
Slovakia Singles Digital (ČNS IFPI)	44
Spain (Promusicae)	55
Sweden (Sverigetopplistan)	1
Switzerland (Schweizer Hitparade)	9
UK Singles (Official Charts)	10
US Billboard Hot 100	13
US Alternative Airplay (Billboard)	35
US Rhythmic Airplay (Billboard)	40

=== Year-end charts ===
Year-end chart performance
Chart (2018)	Position
Estonia (Eesti Ekspress)	61
Portugal (AFP)	140
Chart (2019)	Position
CIS (Tophit)	25
Latvia (LAIPA)	51
Russia (Top All Media Hits, Tophit)	20
Russia (Top Radio Hits, Tophit)	15

== Certifications ==
Certifications and sales
Region	Certification	Certified units/sales
Australia (ARIA)	Platinum	70,000^{‡}
Canada (Music Canada)	2× Platinum	160,000^{‡}
Denmark (IFPI Danmark)	Platinum	90,000^{‡}
France (SNEP)	Diamond	333,333^{‡}
Germany (BVMI)	Platinum	400,000^{‡}
Italy (FIMI)	Platinum	100,000^{‡}
Mexico (AMPROFON)	3× Platinum	180,000^{‡}
New Zealand (RMNZ)	4× Platinum	120,000^{‡}
Poland (ZPAV)	2× Platinum	100,000^{‡}
Portugal (AFP)	Gold	5,000^{‡}
Spain (Promusicae)	Gold	30,000^{‡}
United Kingdom (BPI)	Platinum	600,000^{‡}
United States (RIAA)	4× Platinum	4,000,000^{‡}
^{‡} Sales+streaming figures based on certification alone.
