= Lil Tracy =

American rapper and singer (born 1995)

- Also known as: Yung Dude; Yung Bruh; Souljahwitch; Eblis the Persian Dolphin; Yung Karma; Tracy Minaj
- Born: Jazz Ishmael Butler; October 3, 1995 (age 31); Teaneck, New Jersey, U.S.
- Origin: Virginia Beach, Virginia, U.S.
- Genres: Hip hop; trap; SoundCloud rap; emo rap; cloud rap; alternative rock
- Occupations: Rapper; singer; songwriter; record producer
- Years active: 2012–present
- Label: Virgin Music
- Member of: GothBoiClique
- Website: liltracyworld.com
- Parents: Ishmael Butler; Cheryl "Coko" Gamble

Jazz Ishmael Butler (born October 3, 1995), known professionally as Lil Tracy and formerly as Yung Bruh, is an American rapper, singer and songwriter. He emerged from the underground hip-hop scene associated with SoundCloud in the mid-2010s, developing a style that incorporates cloud rap, emo rap, trap and influences from punk rock and electronic music.

Butler was associated with the Thraxxhouse and GothBoiClique collectives and gained wider recognition through his collaborations with rapper Lil Peep. Their recordings include "White Tee", "White Wine", "Witchblades" and "Awful Things", the last of which reached number 79 on the Billboard Hot 100 in 2017.

His solo albums include Anarchy (2019), Designer Talk 2 (2020), Saturn Child (2022) and Babyvamp (2025). He is the son of rapper and producer Ishmael Butler, of Digable Planets and Shabazz Palaces, and singer Coko, of the R&B group SWV.

== Early life ==
Butler was born in Teaneck, New Jersey, on October 3, 1995, to musicians Ishmael Butler and Cheryl "Coko" Gamble. His parents separated when he was young, and he grew up primarily in Virginia Beach, Virginia, with periods spent living in Seattle with his father.

Growing up in a musical family, Butler was exposed to the professional music industry from an early age. His mother dedicated her solo single "Sunshine" to him. Butler later said that he had not fully appreciated his parents' prominence as a child.

During his adolescence, Butler developed interests in skateboarding, graffiti, video games and punk rock. He encountered punk music partly through the soundtracks of the Tony Hawk's Pro Skater video games and subsequently became interested in Southern hip-hop, witch house and experimental internet rap. He participated in online music communities, particularly on Tumblr, where he adopted the name Souljahwitch.

Butler had difficulties at school and, at the age of 16, left his family home to live with friends in a tent in Virginia Beach. During this period, he began recording music using a laptop and inexpensive equipment, sometimes working at friends' houses or at local restaurants where he could charge his computer. He began releasing music online under the name Yung Bruh.

== Career ==
=== Early recordings, Thraxxhouse and GothBoiClique (2012–2016) ===
Butler began recording music in his teens under several pseudonyms, including Souljahwitch, Yung Bruh, Yunng Karma and Eblis the Persian Dolphin. His early releases circulated primarily online and combined atmospheric hip-hop production with influences from witch house and experimental electronic music.

In 2014, producer Nedarb contacted Butler and invited him to Los Angeles, where members of the underground collective Thraxxhouse were living and recording. Butler relocated to the city and became involved with the collective, which had originated in Seattle and included rapper Mackned. The musicians lived and recorded together, with their work circulating through SoundCloud and other internet platforms.

Butler subsequently became associated with GothBoiClique, a collective whose members included Wicca Phase Springs Eternal, Cold Hart and Horse Head. The group's music combined hip-hop with influences from emo, punk and internet subcultures. Its members developed a following through online releases and performances.

During this period, Butler began using the name Lil Tracy, inspired by a Tracy McGrady basketball jersey given to him by Nedarb. By 2016, Lil Tracy had become his principal recording name. Butler subsequently left GothBoiClique in 2017, although he continued to be associated with musicians from the collective.

=== Collaborations with Lil Peep and early recognition (2016–2017) ===
Butler met rapper Lil Peep in Los Angeles in 2016 through their mutual association with Nedarb and GothBoiClique. The two recorded "White Tee" on the day they met, also filming its music video. The song circulated widely online and helped establish their musical partnership.

They released the collaborative EP Castles on July 4, 2016, followed by Castles II on February 6, 2017. The recordings combined melodic, often guitar-based production with hip-hop rhythms and lyrics addressing relationships, isolation and emotional distress. Songs including "White Wine", "Witchblades" and "Your Favorite Dress" became closely associated with their work together.

In 2017, Butler released several solo projects, including Tracy's Manga, XOXO and Life of a Popstar. He also appeared on "Awful Things", a single from Lil Peep's album Come Over When You're Sober, Pt. 1. The song reached number 79 on the Billboard Hot 100 following Peep's death in November 2017, becoming Butler's first appearance on the chart.

Although the two artists became closely identified with one another, their relationship experienced tensions during 2017. Lil Peep died on November 15 of that year. Butler subsequently discussed the impact of his friend's death on his personal life and musical career in interviews with The Fader and Pitchfork.

=== Solo development and Anarchy (2018–2019) ===
During 2018, Butler continued developing his solo career and experimenting with musical styles outside the emo rap sound associated with his earlier collaborations.

His country-influenced single "Like a Farmer", released in 2018, attracted attention online and was subsequently remixed with a guest verse from Lil Uzi Vert. Its humorous combination of country imagery and trap production represented a departure from his earlier work.

Butler released the EPs Designer Talk and Sinner in October and November 2018, respectively. Sinner returned to more overtly emotional songwriting and guitar-influenced production. In interviews published during this period, Butler discussed his efforts to recover from personal difficulties and to develop a musical identity beyond his collaborations with Lil Peep.

In September 2019, Butler released Anarchy, an eight-track album including the singles "Bad for You" and "Beautiful Nightmare". The album drew on emo and pop-punk influences and was dedicated to Lil Peep.

=== Designer Talk 2 and Saturn Child (2020–2022) ===
Butler released Designer Talk 2 on November 13, 2020. The album moved towards a more conventional contemporary trap sound, with guest appearances from artists including Chief Keef, Lil Keed and Pi'erre Bourne. Its production and vocal approach differed from the guitar-based material of Sinner and Anarchy.

In June 2022, Butler released Saturn Child. The album incorporated elements of electronic dance music, melodic rap and synthesizer-driven production. Reviewing the record for Pitchfork, Nadine Smith described its combination of emo rap, electronic dance music and pop-oriented vocal melodies as another change in Butler's musical direction. Unlike several of his earlier projects, the album featured no guest vocalists.

=== Later releases and collaborations (2023–present) ===
In 2023, Butler appeared on "Woke Up in a Dream", a track from Shabazz Palaces' album Robed in Rareness. The song marked a recorded collaboration with his father, Ishmael Butler. The elder Butler described his son's music as an influence on his own recent work and explained that the recording developed informally during a visit from Tracy.

Butler also released collaborative EPs in 2023, including Pray with Drippin So Pretty and Under Your Spell with Horse Head and Nedarb.

On February 28, 2025, Butler released Babyvamp, a twelve-track album issued through Toreshi. Later that year, he released the six-track EP Villain, which appeared on streaming platforms in November.

In September 2025, Castles I & II, a compilation of Butler's early collaborative EPs with Lil Peep, received a physical release, bringing the previously issued recordings together on one album.

Butler continued releasing music in 2026, including ICONIC, a two-song collaboration with rapper 645AR.

== Musical style and influences ==
Lil Tracy's music has been described as cloud rap, emo rap and alternative hip-hop. His early recordings drew on underground hip-hop, witch house and the internet music culture of the early 2010s.

His work has frequently combined melodic, electronically processed vocals with trap rhythms, atmospheric synthesizer arrangements and elements drawn from rock and emo music. His singing and rapping often move between melodic hooks and more conventional rhythmic delivery.

Butler has experimented with a variety of musical approaches. Sinner and Anarchy placed greater emphasis on emo and pop-punk influences, while Designer Talk 2 explored contemporary trap production and Saturn Child incorporated electronic dance music and synthesizer-based pop.

His stylistic experimentation has extended to country music, most notably on "Like a Farmer", and has been accompanied by changes in his visual presentation and recording aliases.

Although frequently classified as an emo rapper, Butler has expressed reservations about the term, arguing that it inadequately describes the range of his music. In interviews, he has also discussed his experiences as a Black musician within the largely white audience associated with GothBoiClique and emo rap, including instances of racism from listeners.

== Discography ==
=== Albums ===
Title	Album details
e m o c e a n (as lil Tracy)	Released: October 15, 2014; Label: Self-released; Format: Digital download, streaming
Anarchy	Released: September 20, 2019; Label: Self-released; Format: Digital download, streaming
Designer Talk 2	Released: November 13, 2020; Label: Self-released; Format: Digital download, streaming
Saturn Child	Released: June 3, 2022; Label: Self-released; Format: Digital download, streaming
Babyvamp	Released: February 28, 2025; Label: Self-released; Format: Digital download, streaming

=== Mixtapes ===
Title	Mixtape details
Cascadia Vibes (as Persian Dolphin)	Released: October 1, 2013; Label: Self-released; Format: Digital download, streaming
Information (as 1995 REBEL)	Released: December 13, 2013; Label: Self-released; Format: Digital download, streaming
Indigo Soul (as Yung Bruh)	Released: May 27, 2014; Label: Self-released; Format: Digital download, streaming
Asaku's Forest (as asakufox)	Released: July 11, 2014; Label: Self-released; Format: Digital download, streaming
Elegantangel (as Yung Bruh)	Released: January 4, 2015; Label: Self-released; Format: Digital download, streaming
When Angels Cry (Death Has Wings) (as Yung Bruh)	Released: March 22, 2015; Label: Self-released; Format: Digital download, streaming
u,_u (as Yung Bruh)	Released: July 4, 2015; Label: Self-released; Format: Digital download, streaming
Heaven's Witch *eternal spells*	Released: September 25, 2015; Label: Self-released; Format: Digital download, streaming
Baeboyy (as Yung Bruh)	Released: November 24, 2015; Label: Self-released; Format: Digital download, streaming
757 Virginia Hood Nightmares (The Unknown Story)	Released: May 2, 2016; Label: Self-released; Format: Digital download, streaming
Moonstones (as Yung Bruh)	Released: Label: Self-released; Format: Digital download, streaming
Tracy's Manga	Released: February 1, 2017; Label: Self-released; Format: Digital download, streaming
XOXO	Released: March 31, 2017; Label: Self-released; Format: Digital download, streaming
Life of a Popstar	Released: July 31, 2017; Label: Self-released; Format: Digital download, streaming

=== Extended plays ===
Title	Extended play details
Depression (as Yung Bruh)	Released: July 2014; Label: Self-released; Format: Digital download, streaming
Icy Robitussin (as Yung Bruh)	Released: July 25, 2014; Label: Self-released; Format: Digital download, streaming
Gucci Chastity Belt (as Yung Bruh)	Released: 2015; Label: Self-released; Format: Digital download, streaming
Kim K & Kanye	Released: June 10, 2015; Label: Self-released; Format: Digital download, streaming
Tracy World EP (as Yung Bruh)	Released: January 7, 2016; Label: Self-released; Format: Digital download, streaming
Vampire Spending Money	Released: January 20, 2016; Label: Self-released; Format: Digital download, streaming
Desire (as Sicko Tracy)	Released: April 27, 2016; Label: Self-released; Format: Digital download, streaming
Castles (with Lil Peep)	Released: July 4, 2016; Label: Self-released; Format: Digital download, streaming
Castles II (with Lil Peep)	Released: February 6, 2017; Label: Self-released; Format: Digital download, streaming
Fly Away (with Lil Raven)	Released: February 23, 2017; Label: Self-released; Format: Digital download, streaming
Hollywood High (with Mackned)	Released: August 26, 2017; Label: Self-released; Format: Digital download, streaming
Designer Talk	Released: October 5, 2018; Label: Self-released; Format: Digital download, streaming
Sinner	Released: November 2, 2018; Label: Self-released; Format: Digital download, streaming
Pray (with Drippin So Pretty)	Released: January 20, 2023; Label: Self-released; Format: Digital download, streaming
Under Your Spell (with Horse Head and Nedarb Nagrom)	Released: June 2, 2023; Label: Self-released; Format: Digital download, streaming
Villain	Released: September 11, 2025; Re-Released: November 24, 2025; Label: Self-released; Format: Digital download, streaming

=== Compilation albums ===
Title	Compilation album details
S Q U A R E P A N D A S	Released: September 13, 2014; Label: Self-released; Format: Digital download, streaming
Angels Get High Too	Released: June 5, 2015; Label: Self-released; Format: Digital download, streaming
Vintage LSD Compilation (as Yung Bruh)	Released: August 19, 2015; Label: Self-released; Format: Digital download, streaming
Free Tracy! Campaign	Released: February 4, 2016; Label: Self-released; Format: Digital download, streaming
ATS001	Released: April 24, 2016; Label: Self-released; Format: Digital download, streaming
Tracy's World	Released: May 29, 2020; Label: Self-released; Format: Digital download, streaming

=== Charted singles ===
List of singles, with showing year released, peak chart positions and album name
Title	Year	Peak chart positions			Certifications	Album
Title	Year	US	CAN	CZE	Certifications	Album
"Awful Things" (Lil Peep featuring Lil Tracy)	2017	79	58	28	RIAA: 2× Platinum; ARIA: Gold; BPI: Silver; RMNZ: Gold	Come Over When You're Sober, Pt. 1

=== Other charted and certified songs ===
List of other charted and certified songs, with selected chart positions, showing year released and album name
Title	Year	Peak chart positions	Certifications	Album
Title	Year	NZ Hot	Certifications	Album
"White Tee" (Lil Peep featuring Lil Tracy)	2016	—	RIAA: 2× Platinum; BPI: Silver; RMNZ: Platinum	Crybaby
"Witchblades" (with Lil Peep)	2019	18	RIAA: Platinum; BPI: Silver; RMNZ: Gold	Castles II and Everybody's Everything
"Your Favorite Dress" (with Lil Peep)	2021	39		Castles II

=== Guest appearances ===
List of guest appearances, with other performing artists, showing year released and album name
Title	Year	Artist(s)	Album
"white tee"	2016	Lil Peep	Crybaby
"Now or Later"	2016	Kemet Dank, Kirb La Goop, Slug † Christ	Back on My Dick 3
"Sitboi"	2016	Kemet Dank	Yung Post Office 2: Woozy Edition
"the song they played (when i crashed into the wall)"	2016	Lil Peep	Hellboy
"cobain"	2016	Lil Peep	Hellboy
"walk away as the door slams"	2016	Lil Peep	Hellboy
"Never Cry"	2017	Key Nyata	No Way
"Untitled"	2017	CHXPO, Horse Head	Emo Savage
"Why Dey Lie"	2017	KirbLaGoop	Where You Been
"Foever 100"	2017	KirbLaGoop	Angel Wing'z
"Reality"	2017	KirbLaGoop	Angel Wing'z
"She Just Love Me for My Wrist"	2017	KirbLaGoop, DJ Smokey	Kirb Vs. Kirby
"Man Down"	2017	KirbLaGoop, Money Posse, Lil Peep, Big Head	Goop
"Clean"	2017	KirbLaGoop, Elijah Made It	Goop
"So Concieted"	2017	Chris Travis	WATERSZN
"Still"	2017	Diego Money	Diego & Friends
"Easy"	2017	Lil House Phone, Pollari	(310)973-XXXX EP
"Tie My Shoes"	2017	Eddy Baker	Healthy Boy
"Smokin Glue"	2018	KirbLaGoop	Concrete
"Make Believe"	2018	Bandmanfari	April Fools
"Never Letting Go"	2018	Fish Narc, Swan Lingo, YAWNS	Night Angels
"Once Was"	2018	Fish Narc, Swan Lingo, YAWNS	Night Angels
"Not My Type"	2018	Mackned	DeadBeat
"22"	2018	Mackned	DeadBeat
"Foreign Land"	2018	Riff Raff	Tangerine Tiger
"Vices"	2018	The Khan	Khanner
"Peta"	2018	Detas, Neave	Nightmares or Anxiety
"Head Over Heels"	2019	Nedarb, YAWNS, Mackned, Fantasy Camp, Zubin	Amity
"Hold On"	2019	Buku Bandz, Lil Raven	Buku & Friends, Vol. 1
"Foreign Land (Chopnotslop)"	2019	Riff Raff, OG Ron C	Tangerine Tiger (Chopped Not Slopped)
"Till the End"	2019	Brennan Savage	Tragedy
"Bad Memories"	2019	Lil Gnar	FIRE HAZARD
"GRIM REAPER"	2019	phem	VACUMHEAD
"Go for a Ride"	2019	Drippin So Pretty	Die for You
"Barbwire Smile"	2019	SinceWhen, Jaxxon D. Silva, Flossy	Safe For Now
"RATCHETS"	2019	Lil Peep, Diplo	Everybody's Everything
"walk away as the door slams - acoustic"	2019	Lil Peep	Everybody's Everything
"As Above So Below"	2020	Goldfacemoneywatch, Ariel Pink	Gfmw4
"Pictures 2"	2020	Mackned, Lil Peep	Hollywood Dropout
"Show Off"	2020	Lil Candy Paint	EVERYTHANG PURPLE (Deluxe)
"YSL Cologne"	2021	Mackned	Hollywood Dropout 3
"Call My Phone"	2021	Drippin So Pretty	Rest In Peace
"In My Dreams"	2021	Brennan Savage	DARKROOM
"Dogz"	2021	Buku Bandz, Sig.Carlito, CHXPO	Summer Knights
"TrapHorseShorti<3"	2021	Buku Bandz, CHXPO, Sig.Carlito, MaybeTomorrow	Summer Knights
"I Like Stars"	2021	BBY Goyard, David Shawty	Guardian Ghosts
"Desolate"	2022	Maybe Tomorrow	What's Wrong With Me
"love! won'tLAST! / crash! pt I"	2022	Freshie	dirtyBOY!
"Hotel"	2022	Rawska	FREAK
"PRESS A BUTTON"	2022	SosMula	2 HIGH 2 DIE
"TOXIC"	2022	Chris Miles, Lil Xan	have a nice day
"Feel Alive"	2022	Brennan Savage	Till Death Do Us Part
"Must Not Say"	2022	Teddy, Brennan Savage	Tales of Euphoria
"Tatted Everywhere"	2023	KILLKODY	SLITTERMODE
"Illuminati Ties"	2023	KILLKODY, Rage	SLITTERMODE
"LAST LONGER"	2023	Fijimacintosh	NOCTURNAL
"Blood Tonight"	2023	Drippin So Pretty	Flirt With Death
"Woke Up In A Dream"	2023	Shabazz Palaces	Robed in Rareness
"XOXO"	2023	TheHxliday	LUVVERVILLE
"Fighting For You"	2023	Brennan Savage	Tragedy II
"Hello There"	2024	Lyrical Lemonade, Corbin, Black Kray	All Is Yellow
"Cant Stop Wont Stop"	2024	SinceWhen, Brennan Savage, ILoveMakonnen	Begin, Again
"Run Away"	2024	Lil Xan	Diego
"OTV"	2024	Lil Yawh	#1 Pretty Boy The Mixtape
"inHELL.exHELL"	2024	Bad Neighbours, Chris Miles	TVPE!
"Desire"	2024	GothBoiClique	Yeah It's True
"Los Angeles"	2024	GothBoiClique, Horse Head	Yeah It's True
"She Fell Asleep"	2024	GothBoiClique, Cold Hart	Yeah It's True
"i just think"	2025	BABY BUMP, Chris Miles, Bamby H2O	BABY BUMP
"Vamps In London"	2025	Cartier God	Vartier
"I'll Be There"	2025	SinceWhen, Damazein	Why Is Life Like This
"no brain waves"	2026	Chris Miles	boywhodiedwolf
