= Hellboy (Lil Peep mixtape) =

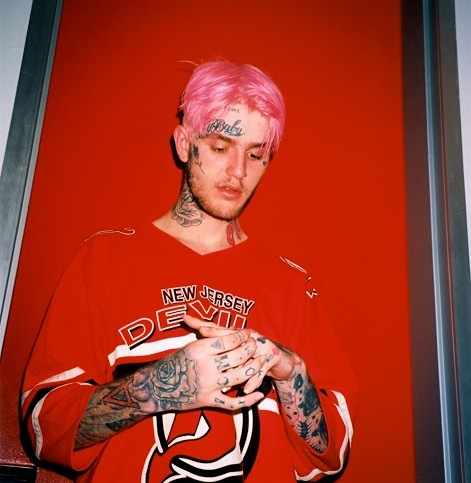

Mixtape by Lil Peep
- Released: September 25, 2016
- Recorded: July–September 2016
- Genres: Cloud rap; emo rap; trap; indie rock; pop-punk; screamo
- Length: 44:23
- Labels: Self-released (re-released via AUTNMY and AWAL)

Lil Peep chronology
Castles (2016)	Hellboy (2016)	Castles II (2017)

Singles from Hellboy
- 1. "Move On, Be Strong" Released: September 5, 2016; 2. "Girls" Released: January 4, 2017

Lil Peep mixtape chronology
Crybaby (2016)	Hellboy (2016)

Hellboy (stylized in all caps) is the fifth and final mixtape by American rapper Lil Peep. It was self-released on September 25, 2016. The mixtape was promoted by two singles and later a headlining tour, The Peep Show Tour, in the spring of 2017.

Upon Peep's death from a drug overdose in November 2017, a Billboard article mentioned "Girls" as one out of seven songs from the late rapper as one of his best works. In 2019, Pitchfork ranked Hellboy at number 193 in its list of "The 200 Best Albums of the 2010s".

On September 25, 2020, Peep's estate re-released Hellboy to streaming platforms on its fourth anniversary with AUTNMY via AWAL. It was released with "drive by" being reproduced with the help of Kyle Dixon and Michael Stein due to sample clearance issues.

== Background ==
On August 30, 2016, Peep announced the mixtape would be releasing on September 25, 2016, on his Twitter account. Originally, the mixtape was going to consist of eight tracks. Seven of them remained on the final project, two with adjusted names. However, the day before the mixtape dropped, Peep released an updated tracklist. "Honestly", the song left off of the project's initial release, produced by frequent collaborator Horse Head, was later released as a single on all streaming platforms in December 2016.

The album cover features Lil Peep standing, looking down at the ground, while wearing a New Jersey Devils hockey jersey. It was photographed by Miller Rodríguez. In a filmed interview for GQ in 2017, Peep had explained that he had read Hellboy comics and was a fan of the character. Hellboy was commercially released on September 25, 2020.

== Critical reception ==
Professional ratings
Review scores
Source	Rating
NME	4/5 stars
Pitchfork	8.5/10

In an article from The New Yorker on the emergence of "sad rap" rising to mainstream prominence in 2017, "OMFG" was described as a "standout on his mixtape [Hellboy]". In 2019, Pitchfork ranked Hellboy at number 193 in their list of "The 200 Best Albums of the 2010s"; executive editor Matthew Schnipper wrote: "His music assures you that you're not alone—and if you haven't, he gives you a glimpse of what that suffering feels like."

== Track listing ==
Credits derived from Spotify and Genius.

Hellboy track listing
No.	Title	Writer(s)	Producer(s)	Length
1.	"Hellboy"	Gustav Åhr; Dylan Mullen; Cody Littlefield; Aaron Gillespie; Christopher Dudley; Grant Brandell; James Smith; Timothy McTague; Spencer Chamberlain	Smokeasac; Yung Cortex	2:57
2.	"Drive By" (featuring Xavier Wulf)	Åhr; Xavier Beard; Braden Morgan; Kyle Dixon; Michael Stein	NEDARB	2:55
3.	"OMFG"	Åhr; Morgan; Phillip Whitman Elverum	NEDARB	3:17
4.	"The Song They Played (When I Crashed Into the Wall)" (featuring Lil Tracy)	Åhr; Jazz Butler; Mullen; Tom DeLonge	Smokeasac	2:15
5.	"Fucked Up"	Åhr; Christopher Thorne; Akihiro Shiba; Kashikura Takashi; Mino Takaaki; Yamane Satoshi; Yamazaki Hirokazu	Horse Head	2:36
6.	"Cobain" (featuring Lil Tracy)	Åhr; Butler; Mullen; Mike Kinsella	Smokeasac	2:30
7.	"Gucci Mane"	Åhr; Charlie Shuffler; Martin Puschel	Charlie Shuffler	2:18
8.	"Interlude"	Åhr; Nicholas Brobak; Eric Judy; Isaac Brock; Jeremiah Green	Brobak	3:19
9.	"Worlds Away"	Åhr; Thorne; Conor Oberst	Horse Head	2:06
10.	"Red Drop Shawty" (featuring KirbLaGoop)	Åhr; Shuffler; Puschel; Ryan Kirby	Charlie Shuffler	2:45
11.	"Girls" (featuring Horse Head)	Åhr; Thorne; McKinley Leon	Dirty Vans	4:00
12.	"Nose Ring"	Åhr; Cian Patterson; Benjamin Perri; Brian Deneeve; Francis Mark; Michael Pilato; Scott Gross	Cian P	2:49
13.	"We Think Too Much"	Åhr; Morgan; Richard David James	NEDARB	3:18
14.	"The Last Thing I Wanna Do"	Åhr; Mullen; Kelen Capener; Kevin Geyer; Parker Cannon; Ryan Torf; William Levy	Smokeasac	2:27
15.	"Walk Away as the Door Slams" (featuring Lil Tracy)	Åhr; Butler; Littlefield; Mark Hoppus; Travis Barker	Yung Cortex	2:40
16.	"Move On, Be Strong"	Åhr; Mullen; Littlefield; Brian Elwin Haner Jr.; James Owen Sullivan; Matthew Charles Sanders; Zachary Baker	Smokeasac; Lil Peep; Yung Cortex	2:01
Total length:				44:21

Notes

- All titles are stylized in all lowercase except for "OMFG".
- "Hellboy" samples the rock band Underoath's 2008 song "Too Bright to See, Too Loud to Hear".
- "Drive By" samples the intro of Kyle Dixon's song "Castle Byers". This sample is replaced in the re-released version, where production credits also go to Kyle Dixon and Michael Stein.
- "OMFG" contains a sample of "I'll Not Contain You" by The Microphones.
- "The Song They Played (When I Crashed Into the Wall)" samples an acoustic performance by Tom DeLonge.
- "Fucked Up" samples Toe's song "My Little Wish".
- "Cobain" samples Owen's song "Bad News".
- "Gucci Mane" samples Minor2Go's loop "Lonely 1".
- "Interlude" samples the ending of Modest Mouse's song "Life Like Weeds".
- "Worlds Away" samples Bright Eyes' song "Something Vague".
- "Red Drop Shawty" samples Minor2Go's loop "Anxi".
- "Nose Ring" samples From Autumn to Ashes' song "No Trivia".
- "We Think Too Much" sample Aphex Twin's song "Lichen".
- "The Last Thing I Wanna Do" samples the intro of The Story So Far's song "Navy Blue".
- "Walk Away as the Door Slams" samples +44's song "155 (Acoustic Version)".
- "Move On, Be Strong" samples Avenged Sevenfold's song "Unholy Confessions".

== Charts ==
Chart performance for Hellboy
Chart (2020)	Peak position
Australian Albums (ARIA)	45
Belgian Albums (Ultratop Flanders)	60
Belgian Albums (Ultratop Wallonia)	181
Canadian Albums (Billboard)	71
Dutch Albums (Album Top 100)	61
Finnish Albums (Suomen virallinen lista)	46
German Albums (Offizielle Top 100)	52
Irish Albums (Official Charts)	43
New Zealand Albums (RMNZ)	26
Swedish Albums (Sverigetopplistan)	58
Swiss Albums (Schweizer Hitparade)	69
UK Albums (Official Charts)	37
US Billboard 200	52

== Certifications ==
Region	Certification	Certified units/sales
United Kingdom (BPI)	Silver	60,000^{‡}
^{‡} Sales+streaming figures based on certification alone.
