= Ramez Silyan =

American music video and documentary film director

- Born: U.S.
- Occupations: Director, editor
- Years active: 2016–present

Ramez Silyan is an American filmmaker based in Los Angeles.

== Life and career ==
Silyan is a first-generation Syrian-American. He was born and raised in Los Angeles and received a bachelor's degree from the University of California, Berkeley.

Silyan has directed music videos for artists including Lil Peep, Charli XCX, and The Kid Laroi. His videos for Lil Peep include “Girls” (2017), “benz truck” (2017), and “Save That Shit” (2017). In 2019, he co-directed the documentary Everybody’s Everything with Sebastian Jones. The film chronicles the life of Lil Peep and premiered at the South by Southwest (SXSW) Film Festival, and was executive produced by Terrence Malick.

In 2020, Silyan directed the short film Sorry, which starred Paris Hilton, Chris Zylka, and Gabbriette. He has also directed commercials for brands including RIMOWA, Tiffany & Co., Farfetch, UGG, and Ford. In 2025, he received the Music Film Director Award at the Kodak Film Awards.

== Filmography ==
=== Documentary ===
Year	Title	Contribution	Note
2020	Everybody’s Everything	Director	Documentary

=== Selected music videos ===
Year	Title	Artist/Band	Roles
2016	"Left Right"	Playboi Carti and Lil Uzi Vert	Director
2017	"Benz Truck"	Lil Peep	Director
2018	"Life Is Beautiful"	Lil Peep	Director
2020	"Pretty Boy"	The Neighbourhood	Director
2020	"Stargazing"	The Neighbourhood	Director
2022	"Minnesota Is a Place That Exists"	Glaive	Director
2023	"Kids Are Growing Up (Part 1)"	The Kid Laroi	Director
2023	"Bleed"	The Kid Laroi	Director
2023	"What Just Happened"	The Kid Laroi	Director
2023	"Let Me Go"	Daniel Caesar	Director
2023	"Mourning"	Post Malone	Director
2023	"Speed Drive"	Charli XCX	Director
2024	"Toxic Till the End"	Rosé	Director
2025	"Hula Girl"	The Neighbourhood	Director
2025	"Private"	The Neighbourhood	Director

== Awards and nominations ==
Year	Result	Award	Category	Work	Ref.
2019	Nominated	South by Southwest	24 Beats Per Second	Everybody's Everything	
2020	Won	SoundTrack Cologne	Best Documentary	Everybody's Everything	
2021	Nominated	Camerimage	Music Videos Competition	The Neighbourhood – "Pretty Boy"	
2025	Nominated	MTV Video Music Awards	Best K-Pop	Rosé – "Toxic Till the End"	
2025	Nominated	iHeartRadio Music Awards	Best Music Video	Rosé – "Toxic Till the End"	
2026	Won	UK Music Video Awards	Best Rock Video – International	The Neighbourhood – "Hula Girl"	
