= Northleach =

Coordinates: 51.8290°N 1.8374°W

- Market town
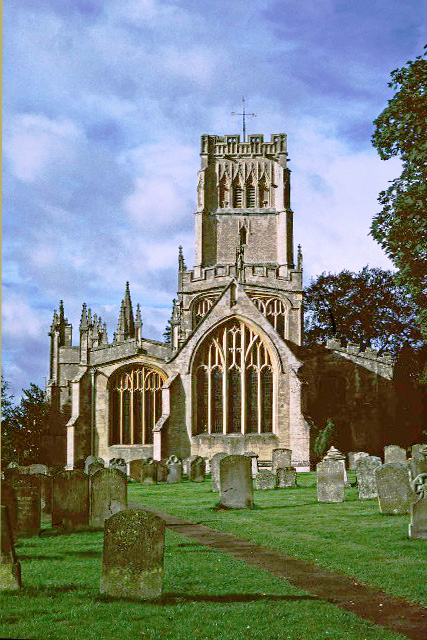
- SS Peter and Paul parish church

- Location within Gloucestershire
- Population: 1,931 (2021 Census)
- OS grid reference: SP1114
- Civil parish: Northleach with Eastington
- District: Cotswold
- Shire county: Gloucestershire
- Region: South West
- Country: England
- Sovereign state: United Kingdom
- Post town: Cheltenham
- Postcode district: GL54
- Dialling code: 01451
- Police: Gloucestershire
- Fire: Gloucestershire
- Ambulance: South Western
- UK Parliament: North Cotswolds
- Website: Northleach with Eastington Town Council

Northleach is a market town and former civil parish, now in parish Northleach with Eastington, in the Cotswold district, in Gloucestershire, England. The town is in the valley of the River Leach in the Cotswolds, about 10 miles (16 km) northeast of Cirencester and 11 miles (18 km) east-southeast of Cheltenham. The 2011 Census recorded the parish's population as 1,854, the same as Northleach built-up-area. The 2021 Census recorded the population as 1,931.

== Manor ==
Northleach seems to have existed by about AD 780, when one Ethelmund son of Ingold granted 35 tributarii of land to Gloucester Abbey. The abbey later granted estates including Northleach to Ealdred, Bishop of Worcester, probably in about 1058 when he had the abbey church rebuilt. In 1060, Ealdred was translated to York, taking the lordship of Northleach with him. The Domesday Book of 1086 assessed the manor of Northleach at 37 hides. In 1095 a later Archbishop of York, Thomas of Bayeux, restored manors including Northleach to Gloucester Abbey. His successors disputed this until 1157, when the claim was finally settled in the abbey's favour.

In 1539, Parliament passed the Suppression of Religious Houses Act, and in 1540 Gloucester Abbey was suppressed and surrendered its estates to the Crown. Northleach became a Royal manor and remained so until 1611, when James I sold it to George and Thomas Whitmore. By 1641 it had passed to their brother Sir Thomas Whitmore, 1st Baronet, of Apley, Shropshire. Sir Thomas was a Royalist, so in 1645 in the English Civil War the Parliamentarians sequestered his estates, but Northleach was given such a low valuation that he was allowed to keep it. Northleach stayed in his family until 1753, when William Whitmore sold it to James Lennox Dutton, who had inherited a number of houses in the town from his father. In 1771 his son John Lenox Dutton left Northleach to Rev. Richard Rice, Rector of Quenington. It then descended via Rice's son and was divided between his three granddaughters. Jevon Harper, husband of one of the three sisters, eventually obtained all three shares in the manor.

By 1863 the manor had passed to Rev. Richard Blanche, minister of Northleach's Congregational chapel. In 1870 and 1906 one Thomas Stephens held the manor. In 1914 it was held by one Charles Cole, who died in 1931, leaving it to Mrs Alice Cole.

== Church and chapels ==
=== Church of England ===
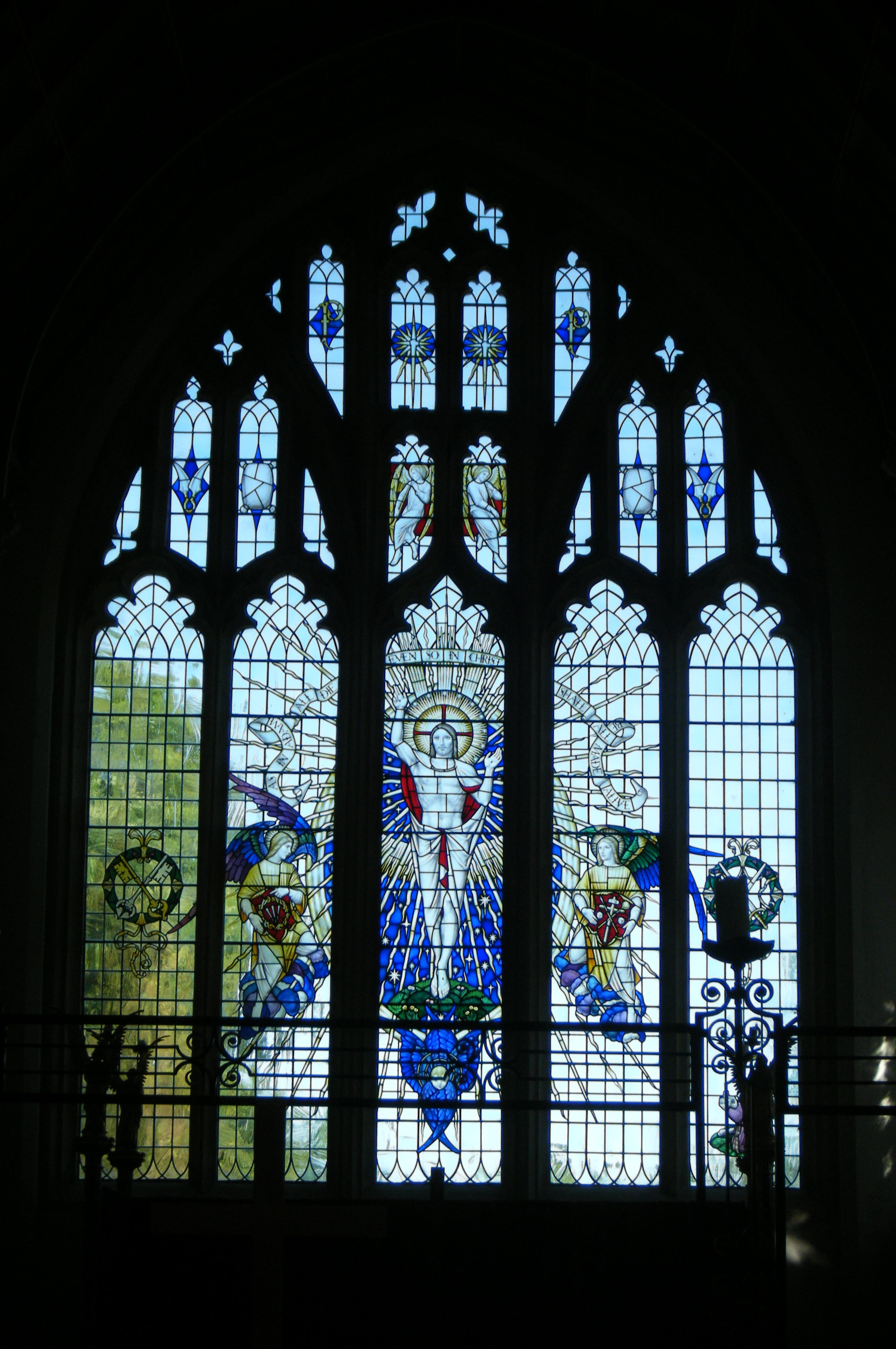
15th-century east window of SS Peter and Paul parish church, with glass designed by Christopher Webb made in 1963

The earliest record of the parish church is from about 1100. No confirmed material from this period survives in the current Church of England parish church of SS Peter and Paul; there has been speculation that some Norman masonry may exist in the west wall of the lady chapel (known as the Bicknell Chapel), though this is disputed. The next oldest part of the church is a 14th-century cusped doorway on the north side of the chancel.

From the late 14th century the church was almost completely rebuilt in Perpendicular Gothic style. The west tower was begun in about 1380–1400, and the font is also late 14th-century. The current nave and south porch were built in the first half of the 15th century, as was the pulpit. The nave has tall five-bay arcades with slender octagonal columns ornamented with concave sides. The nave clerestory was paid for by John Fortey, a wool merchant, who died in 1459. The lady chapel is south of the chancel and was completed in 1489. It has a squint to the high altar in the chancel.

The church was restored 1877–84 to designs by the Gothic Revival architect James Brooks. The chancel received a stained glass east window made by Alexander Gibbs in 1871. Little of Brooks' work at Northleach survives, except for his choir stalls in the north aisle. The church's pre-reformation medieval stone mensa slab was discovered buried beneath the chancel floor during this restoration work, but was then reburied. It was then re-discovered in 1902 and restored to its place as the high altar. In 1920, riddel posts designed by FE Howard was installed in the chancel.

In 1961 a new restoration was begun, which included seats designed by Sir Basil Spence and made by Gordon Russell. In the chancel Gibbs' 1871 east window was replaced by a modern one of Christ in Majesty made by Christopher Webb in 1963. The church is now a Grade I listed building. Its benefice is now combined with the parishes of Cold Aston, Compton Abdale, Farmington, Hampnett, Haselton, Notgrove and Turkdean.

The parish church is notable for its number of monumental brasses. Most portray local wool merchants in civilian clothes with their wives: John Taylour (died 1400) and his wife Joane, Thomas Fortey (died 1447) with his wife Agnes and her first husband William Sors, John Fortey (died 1459), William Midwinter (died 1501) and his wife, Robert Serche (died 1501) and his wife Anne, Thomas Busshe (died 1526) and his wife Johane. In the chancel is a brass portraying a priest, William Lander (died 1530), in his Mass vestments.

In 1700 William and Robert Cor of Aldbourne, Wiltshire cast a ring of six bells for the west tower. In 1897, the year of the Golden Jubilee of Queen Victoria, Mears and Stainbank of the Whitechapel Bell Foundry cast a new treble and second bell to increase the ring to eight, and the enlarged ring was rehung. In 1922 the sixth (formerly the fourth) bell from 1700 was recast.

David Verey described the church as "next to Cirencester the most beautiful church in the Cotswolds".

=== Congregational chapel ===
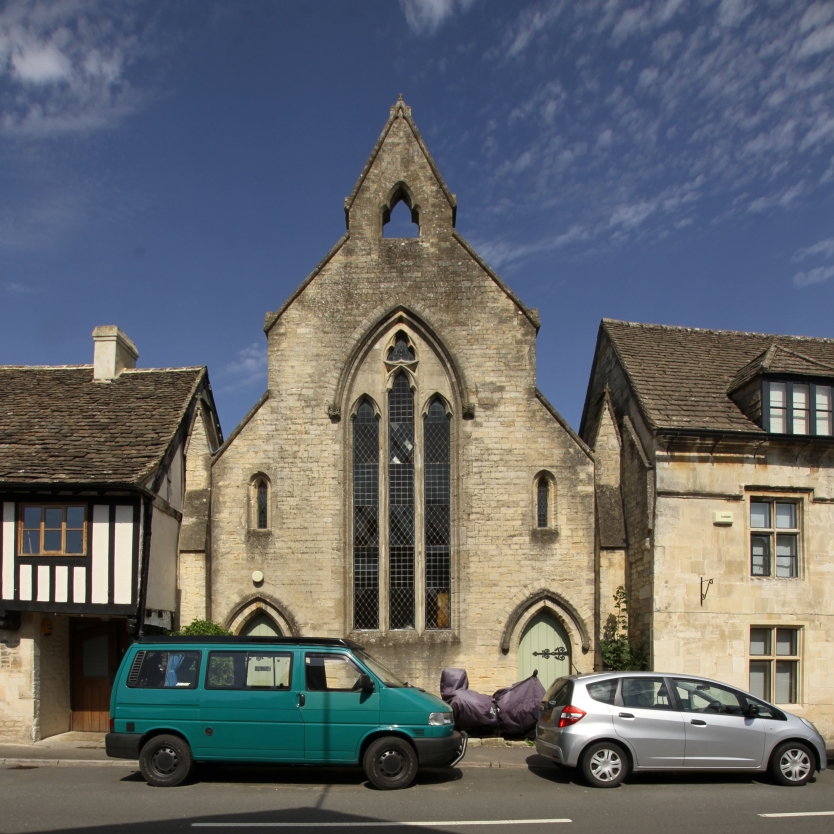
Former Congregational chapel in High Street

Dissenters were recorded in Northleach in the 17th and 18th centuries, and by 1796 a Congregationalist group was meeting in a room in the town. A chapel for it was built at West End in 1798, with a burial ground that remained in use until the 1950s. The chapel was recorded in 1801 as sharing a minister with the chapel at Pancakehill in Chedworth, an arrangement that continued until about 1950. In 1851 the congregation numbered 80 and in 1860 a new chapel was built for it on the main street by the marketplace. In 1900 membership had declined to 28. In 1964 the chapel needed extensive repairs, so it was sold and converted into a house. For a while the congregation worshipped in the Cotswold Hall, but by 1969 it had so few members that it was meeting in a member's home.

=== Methodist chapel ===
In 1821 a group was recorded as meeting at Northleach who may have been Wesleyan Methodists. A small chapel for the group was built at Millend in 1827 and had a Sunday school by 1833. In 1851 the chapel's afternoon service had a congregation of 100 and its evening service had 117. The chapel was a member of the Cheltenham Circuit, and often members of the Cheltenham congregation walked 13 miles (21 km) each way on Sundays to conduct services at Northleach. Membership later declined, partly attracted by the new Congregational chapel opened in 1860, and the Wesleyan chapel was closed in 1883. The Primitive Methodists soon bought the chapel but their mission in Northleach was unsuccessful. By 1889 The Salvation Army had bought the chapel, but they too were unsuccessful. The Congregationalists had bought the former Wesleyan chapel by 1912 and used it as an institute until about 1923.

== Economic and social history ==
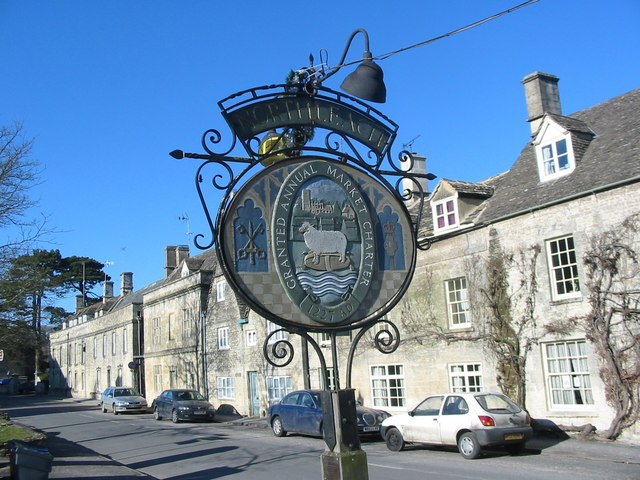
Market place and town sign

In 1219 or 1220 Gloucester Abbey founded the town as a borough with a charter to hold a regular market. The town is strategically placed on what used to be the main road between Oxford and Gloucester, just east of its junction with the Fosse Way Roman road. In the late Middle Ages the town prospered as a strategic centre for the wool trade.

=== Roads and railways ===
The Oxford – Gloucester road was turnpiked in 1751, and by the 1770s it was the main road for both stagecoaches and mail coaches linking Gloucester and South Wales with London. Northleach became a staging post, with the King's Head became the main coaching inn, and by about 1820 the Sherborne Arms trying to win a share of the trade.

In 1841 the Cirencester Branch Line opened and the coach trade lost traffic to the Great Western Railway. A truncated coach service via Northleach then linked Gloucester and Cheltenham with Steventon railway station in what was then Berkshire, until in 1845 the Cheltenham and Great Western Union Railway completed the Golden Valley Line between Swindon and Gloucester via Kemble. By 1853 Northleach's only remaining coach was a single service between Cheltenham and Oxford.

In 1860 a bill to build a railway via Northleach was presented to Parliament. Objections, chiefly from the Great Western Railway, defeated the bill at the committee stage. In 1862 the Bourton-on-the-Water Railway opened, with its terminus at Bourton-on-the-Water 5 1/2 miles (9 km) northeast of Northleach. In 1881 the Banbury and Cheltenham Direct Railway was completed between Bourton and Cheltenham Leckhampton and opened a station at Notgrove 4 miles (6.4 km) north of Northleach.

The Oxford – Cheltenham road ceased to be a turnpike in 1870. It has been classified as the A40 road since the 1920s, and in 1984 it was diverted 1/2 mile (800 m) north of the town by the building of a new bypass road. Since the 1920s the Fosse Way between Cirencester and Halford, Warwickshire has been classified as the A429 road.

In 1962 British Railways closed and dismantled the line between Bourton and Cheltenham and withdrew passenger trains between Bourton and Kingham. In 1964 BR withdrew freight services from Bourton and dismantled the line between there and Kingham. Since then the nearest railway stations to Northleach have been Kemble on the Golden Valley Line and Kingham on the Cotswold Line between Oxford and Moreton-in-Marsh. Kingham is nearer in a straight line, but each is about 16 miles (26 km) from Northleach by road.

=== Law and administration ===
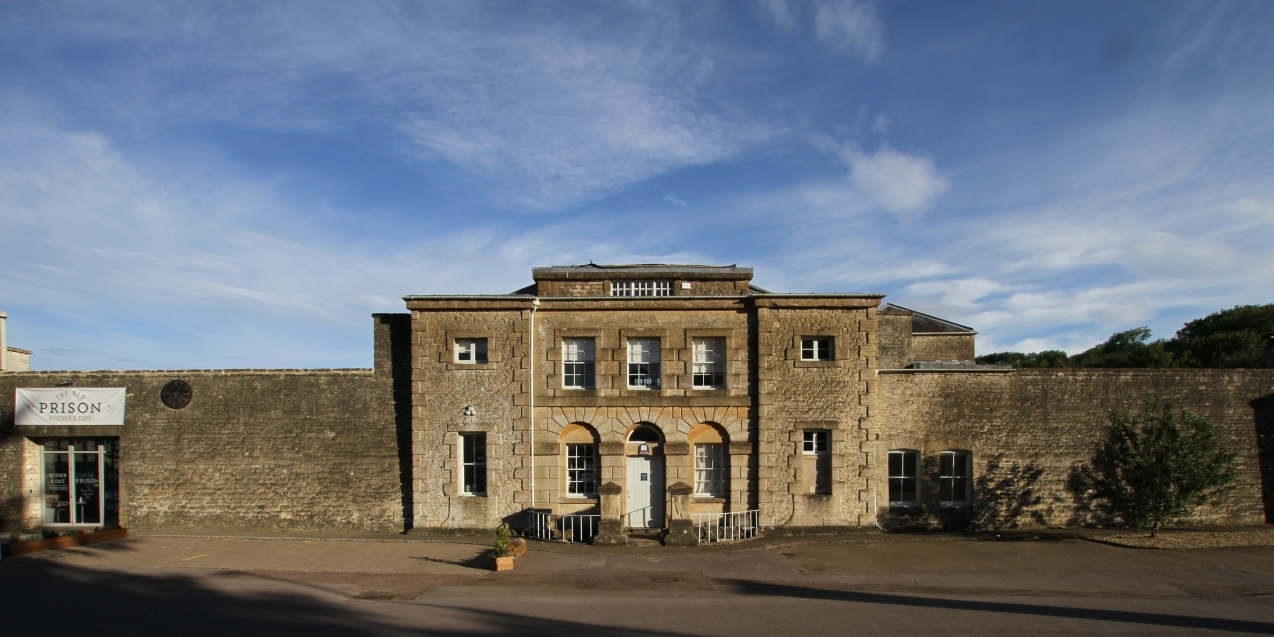
The former House of Correction, built in 1791 and extended in 1842

In 1791 the House of Correction was built outside Northleach on land just west of Fosse Way. It was a new prison designed by the architect William Blackburn on principles advocated by the prison reformer Sir George Onesiphorus Paul. Petty sessions were held at the prison, serving a Petty sessional division whose extent was confirmed in 1836 as 25 parishes. By 1841 a detachment of the new Gloucestershire Constabulary was based at Northleach, and a women's wing was added to the prison in 1842. In 1857 the prison was reduced to holding only remand prisoners, and part of the building was converted into the police station. In 1859 part of the keeper's house was converted into the petty sessions court.

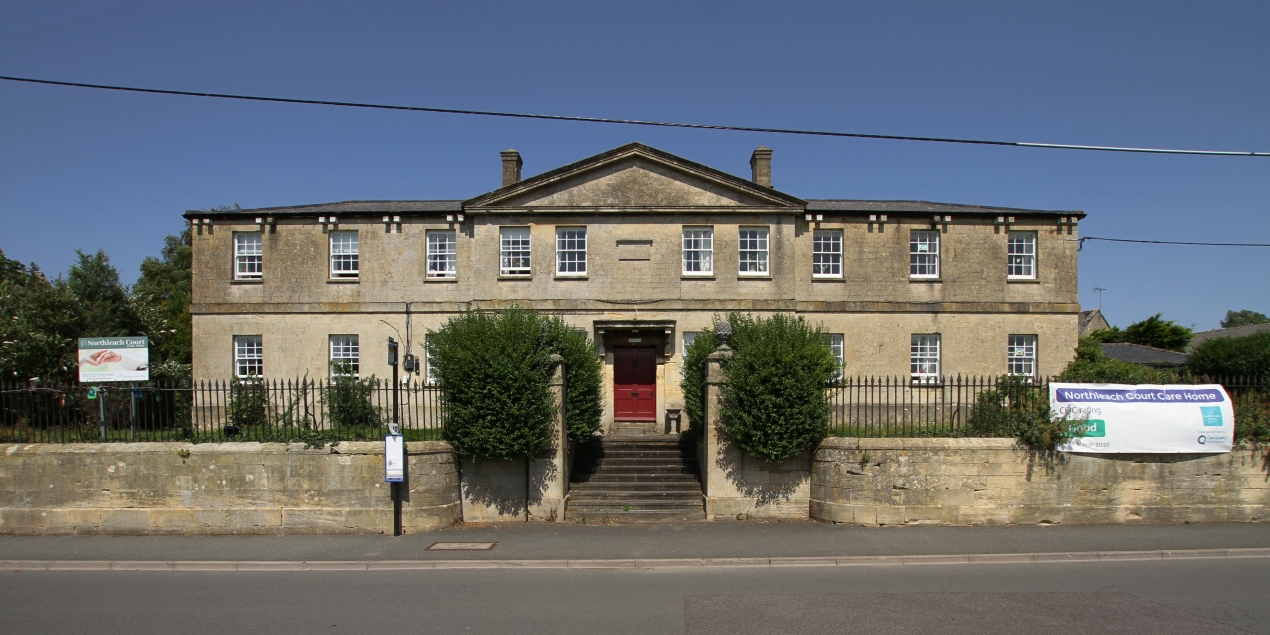
Northleach Court care home. It was built in 1836 as the workhouse.

Parliament passed the Poor Law Amendment Act in 1834 and a poor law union based on Northleach was established in 1836. A workhouse was designed on a cruciform plan by George Wilkinson of Witney, Oxfordshire and built at the east end of the town.

From 1846 a division of the Gloucester county court sat at Northleach, initially at the King's Head Inn. Under the Local Government Act 1894, a Northleach rural district was established in 1895 administering 29 local parishes.

In 1936–37 the main cell blocks of the prison were demolished and the height of the perimeter wall was reduced. In 1972 the police moved to a new station in West End. The following year Northleach petty sessional division was merged with that of Stow-on-the-Wold, and all trials were moved there. In 1980 the surviving prison buildings were converted into a museum or rural life. They are now a Grade II* listed building.

In the late 1940s the workhouse was converted into a geriatric hospital. It was closed in 1987, sold, converted into a private nursing home and reopened as such in 1995. The County Court ceased sitting at Northleach in 1950.

In 1931 the parish had a population of 596. On 1 October 1950 the parish was abolished to form "Northleach with Eastington".

Under the Local Government Act 1972, Northleach Rural District Council was dissolved in 1974 and the area became part of the new Cotswold District Council. Northleach and several neighbouring parishes form the district council's Northleach ward. For elections to Gloucestershire County Council, Northleach is part of the ward of Bourton-on-the-Water and Northleach.

=== Grammar schools ===
Northleach Grammar School Act 1606
- Act of Parliament
- Parliament of England
- Long title: An Act for the founding and incorporating of a free grammar school in the town of Northleech in the county of Gloucester.
- Citation: 4 Jas. 1 c. 7
- Territorial extent: England and Wales

Dates
- Royal assent: 4 July 1607
- Commencement: 18 November 1606 (Note: Start of session.)

Status: Current legislation

Text of statute as originally enacted

In 1559 a bequest by wealthy landowner and sheep-farmer, Hugh Westwood of Chedworth, founded Northleach Grammar School. In 1560 a building on the corner of High Street and Conduit Street (now Farmington Road) was bought by the town to be the school building. In 1606 an Act of Parliament (4 Jas. 1. c. 7) vested its patronage and rights of presentation in The Queen's College, Oxford. College House was built in the 17th century and extended in the late 18th or early 19th century. It was the headmaster's house and also lodged the boarding pupils. In 1877 it was reorganised under the Endowed Schools Acts of 1873 and 1874, and it had 30 pupils in 1885. It ran out of funds and was closed by its governors about 1904.

In 1927 a new, co-educational Westwood's Grammar School was built at the east end of the town. It later came under the administration of Gloucestershire County Council. In 1987 it had 305 pupils in 1987. In 1988 it was closed and its pupils were transferred to the Cotswold School at Bourton-on-the-Water. In 1989 the Westwood Educational Trust was established. Westwood's Grammar School has since been demolished and the Westwood Community Centre built on its site.

=== Primary school ===
A National School in Northleach was founded in 1831 and had 32 pupils in 1833. School buildings on a new site south of Millend were started in 1874 and completed the next year, when the school moved in with about 117 pupils. By 1897 it had been enlarged with capacity for 200 pupils, and average attendance was 144. In 2023 Northleach Church of England Primary School had 116 pupils. It is one of the few Gloucestershire primary schools with its own outdoor swimming pool. The pool is open to the public for a small charge in the summer holidays.

== Amenities ==
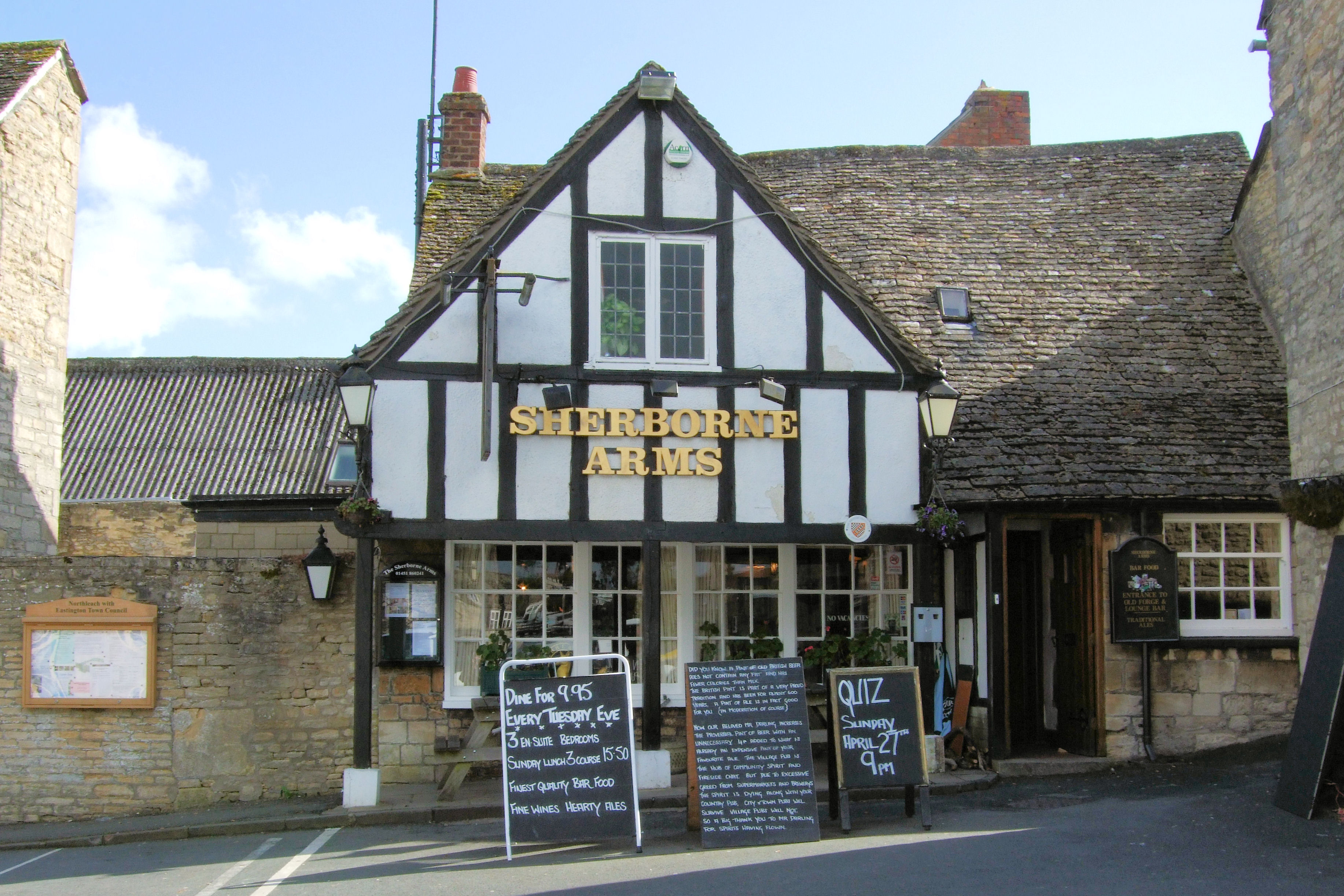
The Sherborne Arms

The town has two pubs: The Sherborne Arms and The Wheatsheaf Inn. There is also a butcher, a baker, art and antique dealers and other shops.

The former House of Correction is now the Old Prison museum and visitor centre, also called Escape to the Cotswolds. Northleach used to have a private museum, the World of Mechanical Music, that exhibited and restored music boxes and other self-playing instruments. It closed in 2019 and the building is now a private house.

Northleach Town Football Club has two teams, both of which play in the Cheltenham Association Football League. Northleach Town Cricket Club has a first and second men's team, ladies' team and junior team. The first eleven played in the Cotswold District Cricket Association league until 2013, since which time it has played only friendly matches.

Northleach also has a sports and social club, darts, running, skittles, snooker and pool and tennis clubs. Most of the clubs use the Northleach Pavilion which is leased from the Town Council. Westwood Community Centre has facilities for a number of sports and community activities. The Snooker Club uses the ground floor of the Cotswold Hall which is on West End, almost opposite the Wheatsheaf Inn.

=== Public transport ===
Northleach's main bus service is Stagecoach West route S2, which links Cheltenham and Oxford via Burford and Witney. Services run four times each way a day from Mondays to Saturdays, and once a day on Sundays. Stagecoach took over the service in July 2020. Its previous operator, Swanbrook Services of Staverton, had operated route 853 with coaches for 35 years.

Pulham's Coaches of Bourton-on-the-Water serve Northleach. Pulham's route 801 runs between Cheltenham and Moreton-in-Marsh via Charlton Kings, Andoversford, Bourton-on-the-Water and Stow-on-the-Wold. Not all services on route 801 serve Northleach: only two each way a day on Mondays to Saturdays and one on public holidays.

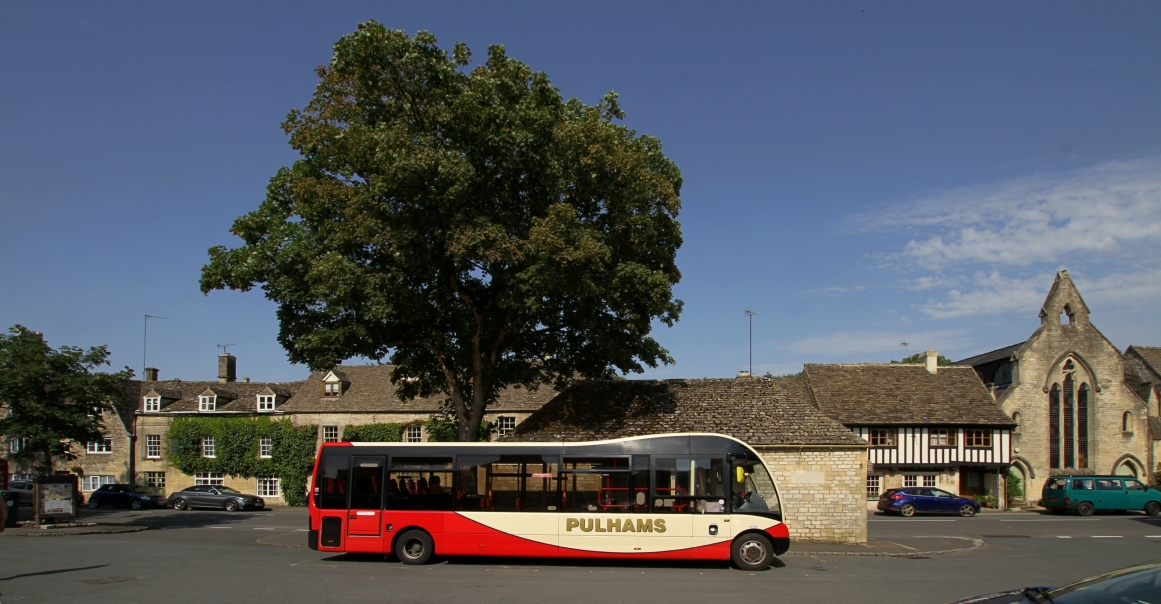
A Pulham's bus on route 855 in the Market Square

Pulham's route 855 between Cirencester and Moreton-in-Marsh via Bourton-on-the-Water and Stow-on-the-Wold also serves Northleach. Currently three buses each way a day serve Northleach on Mondays to Saturdays.

== Media ==
Local news and television programmes are provided by BBC South and ITV Meridian. Television signals are received from the Oxford TV transmitter.

Local radio stations are BBC Radio Gloucestershire , Heart West, Greatest Hits Radio South West and Cotswolds Radio, community based radio station

The town is served by the local newspapers, Wilts and Gloucestershire Standard and The Gloucestershire Echo.

== In culture and media ==
In 1947 L. S. Lowry painted "A Street in Northleach".

In 1999 the BBC drama The Wyvern Mystery was filmed in Northleach. In 2002, The Gathering was filmed in Northleach, taking over the market place with a fair and fake bomb explosion. In August 2014 filming began for the BBC's adaptation of J. K. Rowling's The Casual Vacancy with the marketplace being transformed into the fictional town of Pagford. In 2015 filming started for You, Me and the Apocalypse, a Sky One miniseries; the marketplace was again transformed to look like an apocalyptic version of a Suffolk village.

Northleach was also the setting for This Country, a mockumentary sitcom set in an anonymous Cotswolds village. Filming for the first series commenced in September 2016 and lasted three weeks. Two more seasons and a special were filmed in Northleach over the next three years before the show's cancellation in 2020.

In June 2017 the music video for "Benz Truck" by the now deceased US singer and rapper Lil Peep was released for his debut album Come Over When You're Sober, Pt. 1. Several parts of the video were filmed in Northleach, most notably outside the parish church. Other parts were filmed in Russia and Los Angeles, California. As of November 2018 the video had garnered more than a 250 million views on YouTube and forty million listens on the streaming platform SoundCloud. Lil Peep was filmed on the curiously named road "All Alone" in Northleach, but he missed an opportunity by not finding a nearby street called "The Peep".

== Sources ==
- Carlisle, Nicholas (1818). "North Leach". A Concise Description of the Endowed Grammar Schools in England and Wales. Vol. 1. London: Baldwin, Cradock and Joy. pp. 454–458.
- Herbert, N.M.; Davidson Cragoe, Carol; Jurica, A.R.J.; Williamson, Elizabeth (2001). A History of the County of Gloucester. Victoria County History. Vol. 9. Oxford University Press for the Institute of Historical Research. pp. 106–145. ISBN 978-0197227961.
- Verey, David (1970). Gloucestershire: The Cotswolds. The Buildings of England. Vol. 1. Harmondsworth: Penguin Books. pp. 338–343. ISBN 0-14-071040-X.
- Verey, David (1976). Cotswold Churches. London: BT Batsford. p. 101.
