= Come Over When You're Sober =

Come Over When You're Sober can refer to:

- Come Over When You're Sober, Pt. 1, a 2017 album by emo rapper Lil Peep
- Come Over When You're Sober, Pt. 2 a 2018 album by emo rapper Lil Peep
- Come Over When You're Sober Tour, a 2017 concert tour by emo rapper Lil Peep
