= Mill End =

Mill End or Millend is a placename which refers to streets or buildings near a mill or mill race, and to the following settlements:

== In the United Kingdom ==
- Mill End, Colmworth, Bedfordshire – a hamlet in the named civil parish
- Mill End, Buckinghamshire – a hamlet in Hambleden civil parish
- Mill End, Kirtling, Cambridgeshire – a hamlet in the named civil parish
- Mill End, Finchingfield, Essex – a hamlet in the named civil parish
- Millend, Eastington, Gloucestershire – a hamlet in the named civil parish (Stroud district)
- Mill End, Northleach, Gloucestershire – a hamlet in the civil parish of Northleach with Eastington (Cotswold district) which has in recent times become a contiguous part of Northleach
- Millend, North Nibley, Gloucestershire – a hamlet in the named civil parish (Stroud district)
- Mill End, Rickmansworth, Hertfordshire – a semi-rural village which has in recent times become a contiguous part of the named town
- Mill End, Sandon, Hertfordshire – a hamlet in the named civil parish
- Mill End, Bredon, Worcestershire – a hamlet in the named civil parish
