= Diamonds (Lil Peep and iLoveMakonnen album) =

Studio album by Lil Peep & iLoveMakonnen
- Released: September 8, 2023
- Recorded: 2017
- Studios: Electric Feel Studios; Eastcote Studios
- Genres: Hip-hop; pop; emo rap; pop punk; emo pop
- Length: 81:23
- Label: AWAL
- Producers: Fish Narc; Lil Zubin; Smokeasac; IIVI; Brenton Duvall; ILoveMakonnen; SickDrumz; Yung Cortex

Lil Peep chronology
Changes (2023)	Diamonds (2023)

iLoveMakonnen chronology
Stay Hydrated (2022)	Diamonds (2023)

Singles from Diamonds
- 1. "November" Released: September 1, 2023

Professional ratings
Review scores
Source	Rating
HipHopDX	3.1/5
Pitchfork	7.4/10
RapReviews	8/10

Diamonds (stylized as DIAMONDS) is a collaborative studio album by American rappers Lil Peep and iLoveMakonnen. A collaborative effort, it was released on September 8, 2023, by AWAL. The album was announced prior to Peep's death by him on Twitter and Instagram. However, the project entered development hell after his death and had several false starts before its eventual release in 2023. The album was supported by one single: "November".

Two prior singles, "Sunlight on Your Skin" and "I've Been Waiting" featuring Fall Out Boy, were recorded during the album's sessions and intended to appear on the album but were ultimately omitted. The original version of "I've Been Waiting" which appeared on Everybody's Everything was used for the album instead.

== Background ==
In 2017, Lil Peep and iLoveMakonnen met each other online after Makonnen had come out publicly and met at a mutual friends house. They later started working on music together in July of that year. During this time, they worked with multiple producers on tracks in Los Angeles at Electric Feel Studios, with an initial set of tracks being created. After Peep shifted to London in August, the two continued work on the album at Eastcote Studios and later announced that a collaborative album between the two existed, posting tentative tracklists on Instagram. The album was near completion when Peep started touring for his debut studio album Come Over When You're Sober, pt. 1, which ended prematurely after his death from an accidental Fentanyl–Xanax overdose.

After his death, multiple attempts were made at releasing the project by the other collaborators involved, his then-label and management company First Access Entertainment and his estate. On September 19, 2018, the single "Falling Down" was released with XXXTentacion as a co-artist. The original version of the song called "Sunlight on Your Skin" was released 8 days later. The release of "Falling Down" with the posthumous addition of XXXTentacion's vocals created controversy over the ethical issues around such posthumous collaborations. Fish Narc, one of the producers on Diamonds and a friend of Peep's, disavowed the release as he stated that Peep had objections against XXXTentacion. Neither track appeared in the final release.

Later, in 2019, the single "I've Been Waiting" featuring Fall Out Boy was released with intentions of releasing the album later that year. Later that year, the original version of the track would be released as a part of the compilation album Everybody's Everything. This version of the track was used in Diamonds. However, these plans did not come to fruition and in 2020, the album was leaked.

In 2023, as a part of the settlement of the wrongful death lawsuit filed by Peep's mother Liza Womack against his former label, his estate was given back the rights to his music. On September 1, 2023, the estate and Makonnen announced the album's release date as September 8, 2023 and released "November" as the album's sole single.

== Track listing ==
Tracklist adapted from Pitchfork. Credits adapted from the Lil Peep estate's website.

Diamonds
No.	Title	Writer(s)	Producer(s)	Length
1.	"Smokin'"	Gustav Åhr; Makonnen Sheran; Benjamin Friars-Funkhouser; Kevin O'Neill	Fish Narc; Lil Zubin	4:14
2.	"IDGAF 2"	Åhr; Sheran; Dylan Mullen; George Astasio; Jason Pebworth; Michael Blackburn	Smokeasac; IIVI	3:09
3.	"Favorite Drug"	Åhr; Sheran; Brenton Duvall	Brenton Duvall; iLoveMakonnen	3:55
4.	"Hypnotized"	Åhr; Sheran; Brenton Duvall	Brenton Duvall; iLoveMakonnen	3:44
5.	"Ballin'"	Åhr; Sheran; Lewis Hughes; Nicholas Audino; Te Whiti Warbrick	SickDrumz	2:30
6.	"Really Loving You"	Åhr; Sheran; Friars-Funkhouser	Fish Narc; iLoveMakonnen	2:49
7.	"November"	Åhr; Sheran; Mullen; Cody Littlefield	Smokeasac; Yung Cortex	2:35
8.	"Guiltiness"	Åhr; Sheran; Mullen; Littlefield	Smokeasac; Yung Cortex	3:06
9.	"Prove My Love"	Åhr; Sheran; Duvall	Brenton Duvall; iLoveMakonnen	4:29
10.	"Sidelines"	Åhr; Sheran; Mullen; Astasio; Pebworth	Smokeasac; IIVI	2:08
11.	"I've Been Waiting" (original version without Fall Out Boy)	Åhr; Sheran; Duvall	Brenton Duvall; iLoveMakonnen	4:33
12.	"Rent to Pay"	Åhr; Sheran; Friars-Funkhouser	Fish Narc; iLoveMakonnen	3:46
13.	"I Sell Cocaine"	Åhr; Sheran; Friars-Funkhouser	Fish Narc; iLoveMakonnen	4:09
14.	"That Juice"	Åhr; Sheran; Friars-Funkhouser	Fish Narc; iLoveMakonnen	2:46
15.	"Twisted"	Åhr; Sheran; Hughes; Audino; Warbrick	SickDrumz	2:37
16.	"Nasty Names"	Åhr; Sheran; Friars-Funkhouser	Fish Narc	4:25
17.	"Kiss Me"	Åhr; Sheran; Mullen	Smokeasac	3:48
18.	"Cry Baby 2"	Åhr; Sheran; Mullen; Astasio; Pebworth; Blackburn	Smokeasac; IIVI	3:25
19.	"Hocus Pocus"	Åhr; Sheran; Mullen; Astasio; Pebworth; Alexander Oriet; David Phelan	Smokeasac; IIVI	3:00
20.	"Cruise With You"	Åhr; Sheran; Mullen	Smokeasac; iLoveMakonnen	3:23
21.	"Diamond Piano Freestyle (Outro)"	Åhr; Sheran	iLoveMakonnen	12:52
Total length:				81:23
