= Eastington, Cotswold =

Hamlet in Gloucestershire, England

Coordinates: 51.81638°N 1.81427°W

Eastington
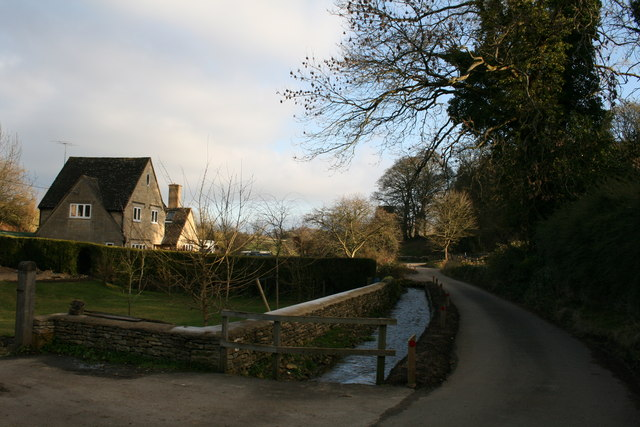

- Location within Gloucestershire
- Civil parish: Northleach with Eastington
- District: Cotswold
- Shire county: Gloucestershire
- Region: South West
- Country: England
- Sovereign state: United Kingdom

Eastington is a hamlet and former civil parish, now in the parish of Northleach with Eastington, in the Cotswold district, in the English county of Gloucestershire, 1.5 miles from Northleach, near Cirencester. In 1931 the parish had a population of 334.

The manor of Eastington (or "Northleach Foreign") was held by St Peter's Abbey, Gloucester, until the Reformation, then passed to the crown and subsequently the Dutton family.

Eastington Manor is a 15th-century hall house with later additions.

== Governance ==
Eastington was formerly a tything in Nothleach parish, from 1866 Eastington was a civil parish in its own right until it was abolished on 1 October 1950 to form "Northleach with Eastington".
