= Smokeasac =

American record producer and singer-songwriter

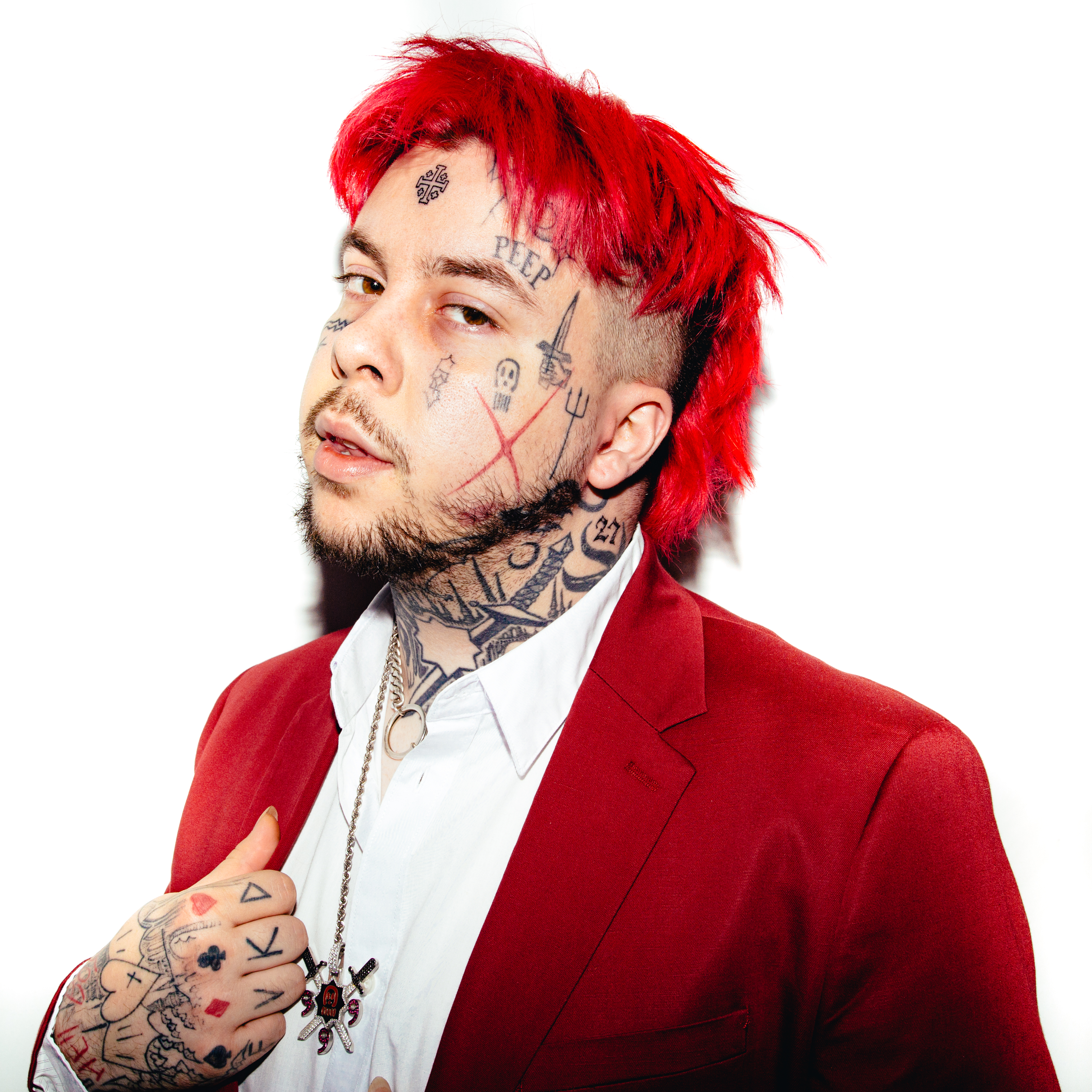
- Smokeasac in December 2019

Background information
- Born: Dylan James Mullen; February 10, 1994 (age 32); Boston, Massachusetts, U.S.
- Genres: Alternative rock; emo rap; hip hop
- Occupations: Record producer; singer; songwriter
- Instruments: Vocals; keyboards; synths; drum machine
- Years active: 2012–present
- Labels: Cobalt90; Access
- Website: www.smokeasac.com

Dylan James Mullen (born February 10, 1994), better known as Smokeasac, is an American record producer, singer, and songwriter. He gained notoriety for being a frequent collaborator and producer for emo rap artist Lil Peep throughout his career.

== Career ==
In 2018, Smokeasac began his solo career with single, "Leave You Behind," which was featured on BBC Radio 1's Rock Show with Daniel P. Carter. His debut EP, Wasteland999, was released on March 8, 2019. During his shows, Smokeasac sometimes plays music from Lil Peep's Come Over When You're Sober Pt. 2.

Smokeasac produced Lil Peep's Come Over When You're Sober, Pt. 1 and Come Over When You're Sober, Pt. 2 albums (. Rob Cavallo (My Chemical Romance and Linkin Park) was also a contributor.

Throughout the project, Smokeasac worked directly with Lil Peep, and became an integral part of the overall feel and essence.

== Songs produced ==
=== Lil Peep ===
- "Nineteen"
- "Cobain"
- "The Song They Played [When I Crashed Into The Wall]"
- "Driveway"
- "Hellboy"
- "Benz Truck (гелик)"
- "Save That Shit"
- "Awful Things"
- "U Said"
- "Better Off (Dying)"
- "The Brightside"
- "Problems"
- "Avoid"
- "Spotlight"
- "Hate Me"
- "Leanin"
- "Broken Smile"
- "Runaway"
- "Sex With My Ex"
- "Cry Alone"
- "16 Lines"
- "Life Is Beautiful"
- "IDGAF"
- "White Girl"
- "Fingers"
- "Benz Truck Pt. 2"
- "Backseat"
- "Sex Last Nite"
- "Kiss"

=== Teddy ===
- "Castle WIth No Light"
- "Guap"
- "Impossible"
- "Foreign Banz"
- "Dead Presidents"
- "Cupid! (Shot Me In The Dark)"

=== Smokeasac ===
- "Leave You Behind"
- "BLACKOUT!"
- "Losing My Mind"
- "After I’m Gone"
- "Insomnia" ft. Travis Barker
- "One Bad Day"
- "Overdose"
