= Sex with My Ex =

Sex with My Ex may refer to:

- "Sex with My Ex", a song by Lil Peep on his album Come Over When You're Sober, Pt. 2
- "Sex with My Ex", a song by Ne-Yo on his album Because of You
