= Goth Angel Sinner =

EP by Lil Peep
- Released: October 31, 2019
- Recorded: 2017
- Genres: Hip hop; emo rap
- Length: 11:20
- Labels: AUTNMY, Columbia Records
- Producer: Fish Narc

Lil Peep EP chronology
Castles II (2017)	Goth Angel Sinner (2019)	Everybody's Everything (2019)

Goth Angel Sinner is the twelfth extended-play and first posthumous EP release by American rapper Lil Peep, released on October 31, 2019, by AUTNMY via Columbia Records. The songs on the EP serve as singles for Everybody's Everything. The project was initially announced in October 2017 on Peep's Twitter account, one month before his death. After his death, the project was delayed indefinitely until October 2018 when the EP was leaked online and then released for streaming in October 2019.

== Background ==
The EP was recorded shortly after Peep's first solo tour The Peep Show in Los Angeles, between stints in London, England, where he also recorded Come Over When You're Sober, Pt. 1 and Pt. 2.

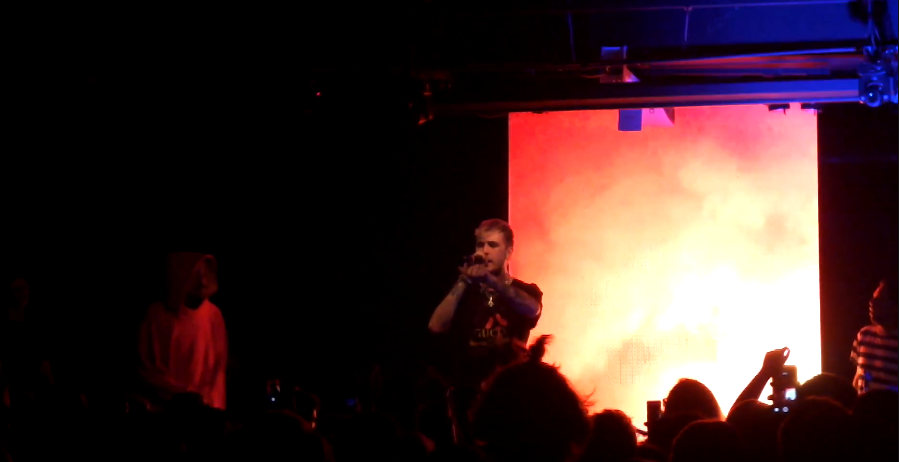
Lil Peep in St. Paul, MN performing "Moving On" during the COWYS tour

All 3 tracks from the EP were featured in the Everybody's Everything compilation. A remixed version of the song "When I Lie" with Ty Dolla Sign was included on the Game of Thrones companion soundtrack, For the Throne.

== Track listing ==
- All tracks are written by Lil Peep alongside producer Fish Narc.

No.	Title	Length
1.	"Moving On"	3:23
2.	"Belgium"	4:00
3.	"When I Lie"	3:57
Total length:		11:20
