= Notgrove =

Village in Gloucestershire, England

Coordinates: 51.8806°N 1.8435°W

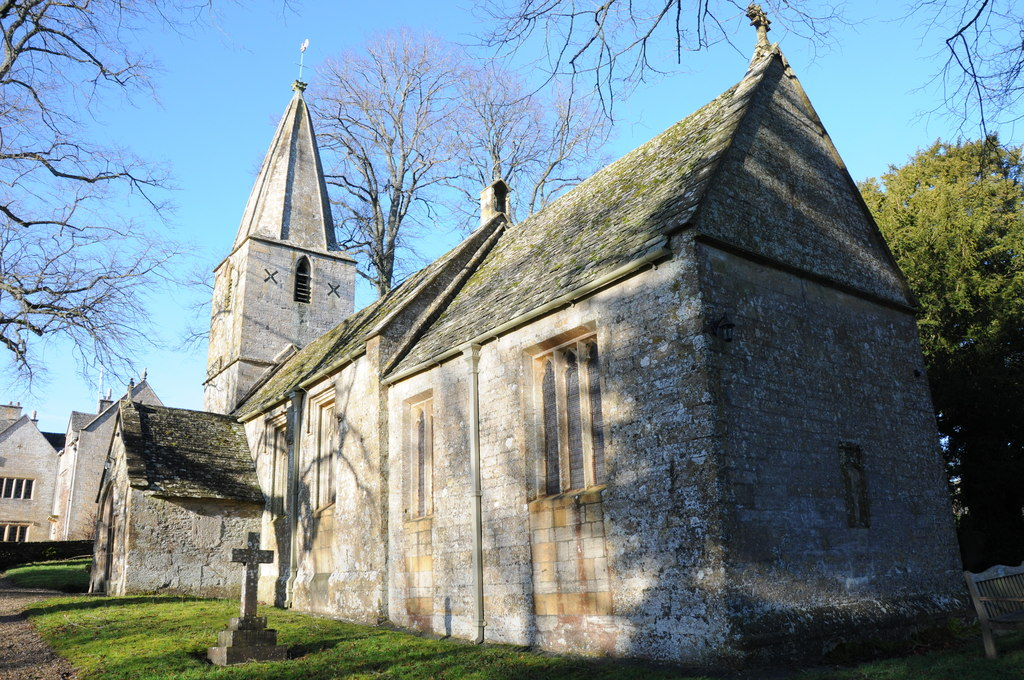
- St Bartholomew's church, Notgrove

- Location within Gloucestershire
- Population: 184 (2011)
- Civil parish: Notgrove
- District: Cotswold
- Shire county: Gloucestershire
- Region: South West
- Country: England
- Sovereign state: United Kingdom
- Post town: CHELTENHAM
- Postcode district: GL54
- Dialling code: 01451
- Police: Gloucestershire
- Fire: Gloucestershire
- Ambulance: South Western
- UK Parliament: North Cotswolds

Notgrove is a village and civil parish in Gloucestershire, England, approximately 28.5 (17.8 miles) to the east of Gloucester. It lies in the Cotswolds, a previously-named Area of Outstanding Natural Beauty, now the Cotswolds National Landscape.

== History ==
The village was recorded as Natangrafum between 716 and 43. It was listed in the Domesday Book of 1086 as Nategrave or Nategraua, the name coming from the Old English næt + grāf meaning "wet grove or copse".

== Governance ==
Notgrove is part of the Sandywell ward of the district of Cotswold, represented by Councillor Robin Hughes, a member of the Conservative Party. Notgrove is part of the constituency of North Cotswolds, represented at parliament by Conservative MP Sir Geoffrey Clifton-Brown. It was part of the South West England constituency of the European Parliament prior to Britain leaving the European Union in January 2020.

== Geography ==
Notgrove is in the county of Gloucestershire and lies within the Cotswolds, a range of hills now designated as the Cotswolds National Landscape. It is about 28.5 km (17.7 mi) to the east of Gloucester. It is approximately 17.5 km (10.9 mi) east of its post town Cheltenham and about 7 km (4.3 mi) west of Bourton-on-the-Water. Nearby villages include Turkdean, Cold Aston, Hazleton, Naunton and Salperton.

== Former railway ==
Notgrove railway station was on the Banbury and Cheltenham Direct Railway.

== Notgrove Manor ==
Notgrove manor was built in the 15th century but adapted and expanded in the 17th and 18th centuries. Further extension including the west wing was added by Cyril Cunard in the early 20th century. He sold it to another ship owner Alan Garrett Anderson in 1918. A fire damaged the house in 1936. In 1969 it was bought by David and Elizabeth Acland who developed the house and garden.

== Church ==
The Church of St Bartholomew is the parish church which is dedicated to Saint Bartholomew. It is a Norman church, believed to be on the site of a Saxon cemetery. It houses effigies to the descendants of Dick Whittington.
