= Everybody's Everything =

Everybody's Everything may refer to:

- Everybody's Everything (album), a 2019 album by Lil Peep
- Everybody's Everything (film), a 2019 documentary about Lil Peep
- "Everybody's Everything", a song by Santana from the 1971 album Santana
