= Runaway (Lil Peep song) =

- Cover art for "Runaway - OG Version", released in 2023

Single by Lil Peep

from the album Come Over When You're Sober, Pt. 2
- Released: November 1, 2018
- Recorded: 2017
- Genre: Emo rap
- Length: 3:12
- Label: AUTNMY; Columbia Records
- Songwriters: Gustav Åhr; Drew Fulk; Steve Choi; Dylan Mullen
- Producers: Drew Fulk; Smokeasac

Lil Peep singles chronology
"Cry Alone" (2018)	"Runaway" (2018)	"Life Is Beautiful" (2018)

Music video
- "Runaway" on YouTube

"Runaway" is a song by American rapper Lil Peep from his second studio album, Come Over When You're Sober, Pt. 2. The song was released posthumously as a single on November 1, 2018, by AUTNMY through Columbia Records. It was written by Gustav Åhr, Steve Choi, Drew Fulk, and Dylan Mullen, with the production handled by Fulk and Smokeasac.

== Background ==
"Runaway" was chosen as a single by Liza Womack, Lil Peep's mother, who stated that she "really liked" the song. An early version of the track leaked online several months prior to its official release. This version was later included on Come Over When You're Sober, Pt. 2 (OG Version), released in 2023.

== Composition ==
"Runaway" discusses "fake" people that surround Peep and includes the repetition of the line "I was dying and nobody was there" alongside Smokeasac's "dark, guitar-driven production."

== Music video ==
The music video was co-directed by Lil Peep's mother, Liza Womack, and Steven Mertens. It premiered on YouTube on November 1, 2018. The video opens with a dedication written by Womack, which reads: "For my passionate, hard-working, and talented son, Gus. And for his alter ego, Lil Peep". It features original drawings created by Lil Peep throughout his life, including ones inspired by Static Shock, depicting his departure from Los Angeles and move to London.

== Charts ==
Weekly chart performance for "Runaway"
Chart (2018)	Peak position
Czech Republic Singles Digital (ČNS IFPI)	28
New Zealand Hot Singles (RMNZ)	28
Swedish Heatseeker (Sverigetopplistan)	18

== Certifications ==
Certifications for "Runaway"
Region	Certification	Certified units/sales
New Zealand (RMNZ)	Gold	15,000^{‡}
Poland (ZPAV)	Gold	25,000^{‡}
United Kingdom (BPI)	Silver	200,000^{‡}
United States (RIAA)	Gold	500,000^{‡}
^{‡} Sales+streaming figures based on certification alone.
