= David Verey =

English banker and philanthropist

Sir David John Verey CBE (born 1950) is an English banker and philanthropist.

== Early life ==
Verey was born on 8 December 1950. He went to school at Eton College and later received a Master of Arts degree in English from Trinity College, Cambridge.

== Career ==
He started his career in finance at Lazard in 1972. In 1983 he was appointed to its board of directors. He became deputy chief executive in 1985 and chief executive in 1990. He was its chairman from 1990 to 2001. From 2001 to 2002, he was deputy chairman of Cazenove, a British stock broker and investment firm. He is to this day senior adviser at Lazard.

From 1996 to 2000 he was on the board of directors of Pearson PLC. From 2004 to 2008 he was chairman of Blackstone Group UK. From 2004 to 2009 he was a senior advisor to FreshMinds, a recruitment and research consultancy firm. From 2009 to 2012 he was a non-executive director of LMS Capital, a private equity firm, and from 2010 to 2011, of Thames River Capital. He has been on the board of directors of the Daily Mail and General Trust, Sofina and Bank Gutmann for 12 years until 2016. Among his continuing involvement with Lazard, he has been chairman of the Government Art Collection Advisory Board since 2013, chairman of the board at Sofina, Trustee of the British Council and chairman of trustees for the Friends of Leighton House Museum.

== Public service ==
He was lead non-executive director in the Department for Culture, Media and Sport. From September 2013 he has been chairman of the Government Art Collection Advisory Committee. From November 2014 until today, he has been Trustee of the British Council.

== Philanthropy ==
From 1992 to 2004 he was on the board of trustees of the Tate Gallery, and from 1998 to 2003, he served as the chairman of its board of trustees. He has been chairman of the board of trustees of ArtFund since 2004. He is on the boards of the Teaching Awards Trust and the Pilgrim Trust. He was a fellow of his alma mater, Eton College, from 1997 to 2012, where he gave funds to create the Verey Gallery, which is named in his honour. He is also a member of the Trinity, Cambridge Finance Committee and the Cambridge University Library Visiting Committee. He is an honorary fellow of St Hugh's College, Oxford. In 2004 he was made a CBE for his philanthropy to the arts.

He was knighted in the 2015 New Year Honours for services to arts philanthropy as chair of the Art Fund.
