= Church of All Saints, Turkdean =

Church in Gloucestershire, England

Coordinates: 51.8552°N 1.8454°W

Church of All Saints
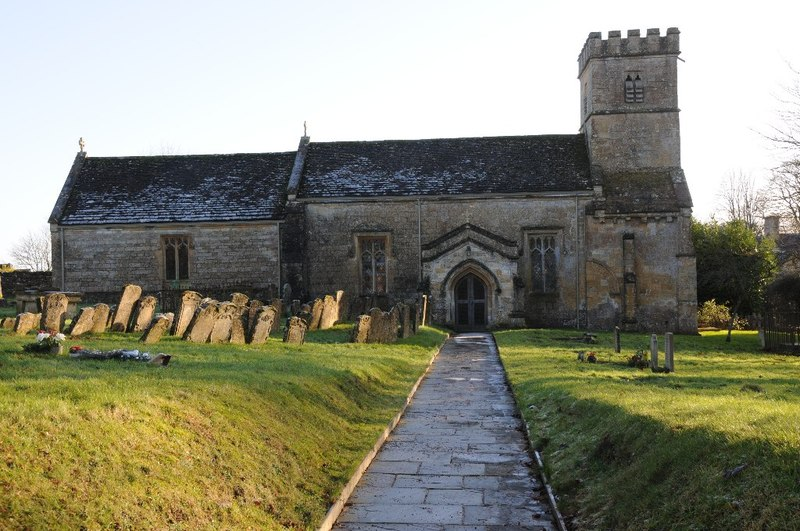

- Denomination: Church of England
- Website: https://allsaintsturkdean.org.uk/

Architecture
- Heritage designation: Grade I listed building
- Designated: 26 January 1961

Administration
- Province: Canterbury
- Diocese: Gloucester
- Archdeaconry: Cheltenham
- Deanery: North Cotswolds
- Benefice: Northleach

The Anglican Church of All Saints at Turkdean in the Cotswold District of Gloucestershire, England, was built in the 12th century. It is a grade I listed building.

== History ==
The church was built in the 12th century. In the late 15th or early 16th century the tower was added and the nave revised and a south aisle added. A Victorian restoration was carried out in 1897.

The church was originally dedicated to St Mary, and then possibly to St Michael, before being rededicated to All Saints in the 18th century. The parish is part of the Northleach benefice within the Diocese of Gloucester.

== Architecture ==
It is a limestone building with stone slate roofs. It consists of a chancel, north aisle, porch and a nave which had the tower inserted at its west end. The tower contains three bells, the oldest of which dates from the 14th century, the others are from 1641.

In the south wall of the chancel is a Norman arch and tympanum. There is also a scratch dial.

The church includes fragments of 14th-century wall paintings. Other wall paintings which were uncovered in 1967 were then sadly whitewashed over.
