= Notgrove railway station =

Former railway station in Gloucestershire, England

Coordinates: 51.8896°N 1.8674°W

Notgrove

General information
- Location: Notgrove, Cotswold; England
- Platforms: 2

Other information
- Status: Disused

History
- Original company: Banbury and Cheltenham Direct Railway
- Pre-grouping: Great Western Railway
- Post-grouping: Great Western Railway; Western Region of British Railways

Key dates
- 1 June 1881: Opened as Notgrove and Westfield
- 24 June 1896: Renamed Notgrove
- 15 October 1962: Station closed
Location

Notgrove railway station was a Gloucestershire station on the Great Western Railway's Banbury and Cheltenham Direct Railway.

== History ==
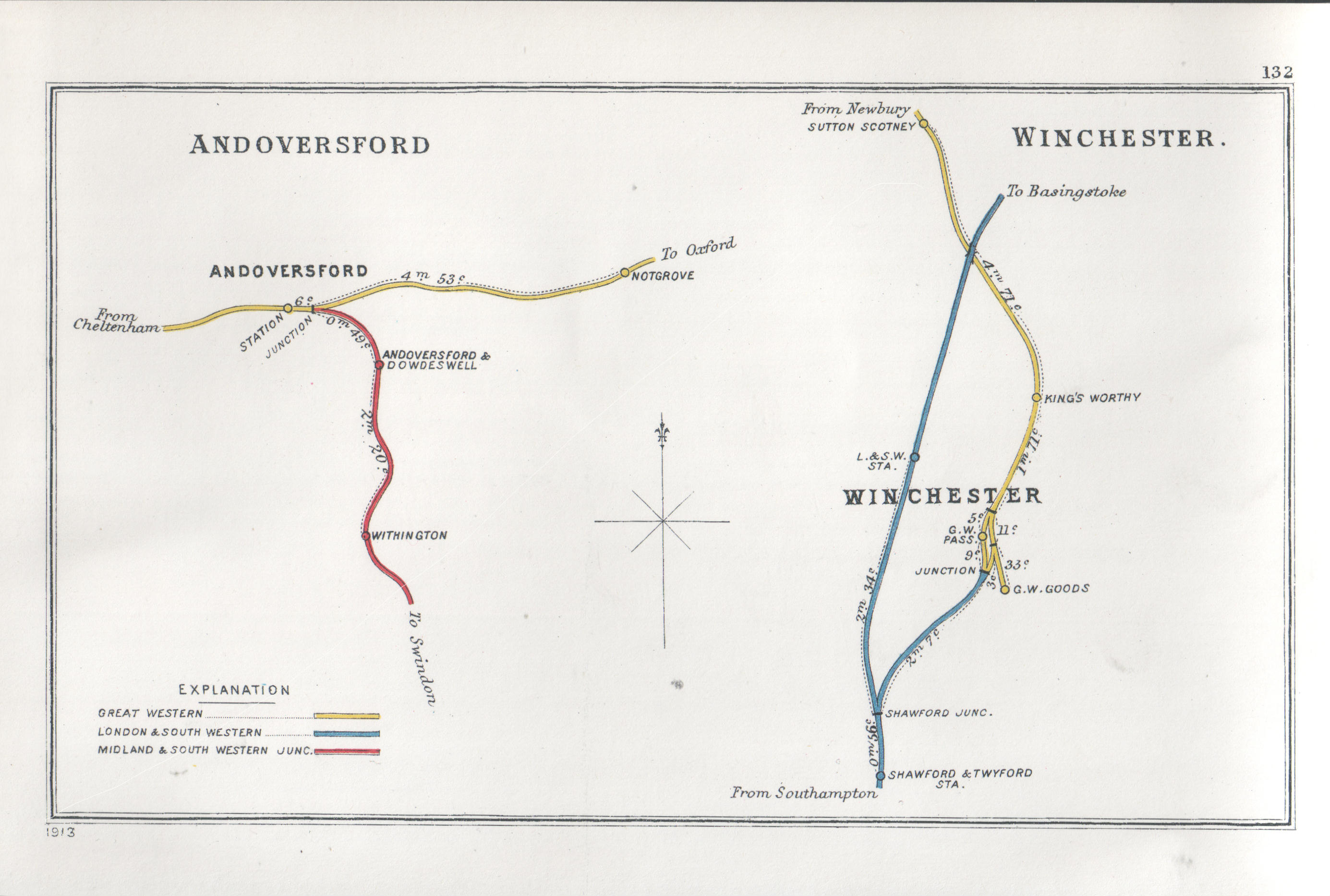
A 1913 Railway Clearing House map of railways in the vicinity of Notgrove

The station opened in 1881. It was situated about a mile north west of Notgrove village, and at 750' was the highest station on the Banbury-Cheltenham direct line. The station passed on to the Western Region of British Railways on nationalisation in 1948. Intended as a transport hub for the surrounding agricultural area, it never fulfilled its potential. The last passenger service to the station was on 13 October 1962. Goods services between the station and Cheltenham ceased a few days later.

The station site is now a camp site.

Preceding station	Disused railways	Following station
Andoversford Junction; Line and station closed	Great Western Railway; Banbury and Cheltenham Direct Railway	Bourton-on-the-Water; Line and station closed
