= Come Over When You're Sober, Pt. 2 =

Studio album by Lil Peep
- Released: November 9, 2018
- Recorded: 2015–2017
- Genres: Emo rap; pop punk; alternative rock; pop rap
- Length: 38:06
- Labels: AUTNMY; Columbia
- Producers: 66swords; IIVI; Lars Stalfors; Mike Will Made It; Scott Theft; Smokeasac; Stalfors

Lil Peep chronology
Come Over When You're Sober, Pt. 1 (2017)	Come Over When You're Sober, Pt. 2 (2018)	Goth Angel Sinner (2019)

Singles from Come Over When You're Sober, Pt. 2
- 1. "Falling Down" Released: September 19, 2018; 2. "Sunlight on Your Skin" Released: September 27, 2018; 3. "Cry Alone" Released: October 18, 2018; 4. "Runaway" Released: November 1, 2018; 5. "Life Is Beautiful" Released: November 7, 2018

Come Over When You're Sober, Pt. 2 (often shortened to COWYS Pt. 2) is the second studio album by American rapper Lil Peep. It was released on November 9, 2018, by AUTNMY through Columbia Records. An emo rap album, Come Over When You're Sober, Pt. 2 is a sequel to Come Over When You're Sober, Pt. 1, and contains similar themes about topics such as cocaine and drug use, depression, suicide, and relationships, delivered through deadpan vocals and alternative rock inspired compositions.

Demos for Pt. 2 were recorded by Peep at the same time as Pt. 1, and the lyrics that Peep wrote were inspired by contemporary events and personal grievances. After the acquisition of these demos by Columbia Records, production started posthumously with trio IIVI and longtime partner Smokeasac returning. Peep's mother, Liza Womack, was involved in the production process, and spoke at a Columbia-hosted listening party to promote the album.

As his first posthumous release, Come Over When You're Sober, Pt. 2 comes after Lil Peep died from a drug overdose months after the release of Pt. 1. The album debuted at number four on the US Billboard 200, selling over 81,000 album-equivalent units in its first week of sales. The album received generally positive reviews from music critics, who praised its production and lyricism and noted its significance to Generation Z. The album produced five singles, the lead being "Falling Down" with fellow late American emo rapper XXXTentacion, who was murdered outside a motorcycle dealership in June 2018, three months before the lead single's release.

== Background ==
Following Lil Peep's death, his label and family began to back up his MacBook Pro laptop which included recordings from the Come Over When You're Sober sessions. The project was first backed up in the headquarters of First Access Entertainment in London before his secondary laptop being backed up in an Apple Store by his mother Liza Womack.

Peep's producer Smokeasac revealed that Peep had made several unreleased songs, ones specifically made for a possible sequel to his debut album entitled Come Over When You're Sober, Pt. 1. In a tweet shortly after Peep's death, Smokeasac tweeted that he and Peep made "beautiful music" during 2017 and that he still has unreleased music from him. In February 2018, Smokeasac tweeted a confirmation that the album is coming, but would be released when the "time is right". The release date was later confirmed to be November 9, 2018.

Smokeasac, in an interview with NME, discussed Peep's influences during the songwriting process of Pt. 2:

...Peep was going through a lot of stuff at the time. He was really started to see the attention from his fans and he was really growing. But he also had personal problems in his life. We were both going through similar situations. I think both of us were using the music as a way of venting, almost...He and his girlfriend at the time were going through a rough patch and that fuelled [sic] some of the music.

You know, growing up in the area he was in where he was an outcast. There was trouble in school, and then also with his father...I think, like with me, his relationship with his father took a toll on him. No matter how happy he was he still had demons, for sure. But he was good at hiding it, especially from the people he cared about.

== Recording and production ==
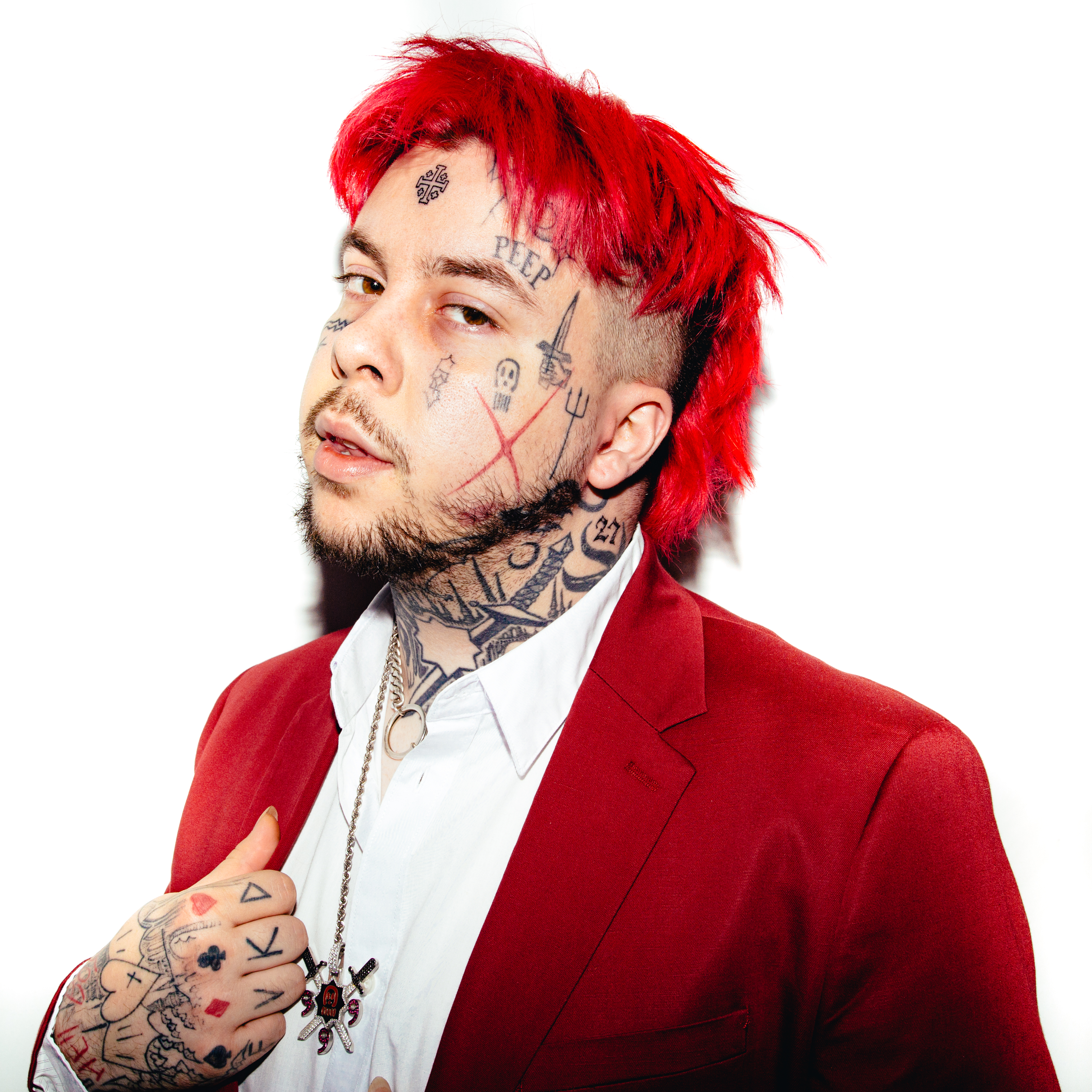
Smokeasac, a frequent collaborator of Peep, handled production on the album

Come Over When You're Sober, Pt. 2 was produced posthumously by Smokeasac and George Astasio of IIVI. Peep, as a part of the songwriting process, would write his songs fast and self-produce his songs; the album consists of his already completed or partially completed demos with the rest of production handled by Smokeasac and Astasio. Most of the demos for Pt. 2 were recorded at the same time as Come Over When You're Sober, Pt. 1. Peep's demos were almost entirely recorded with specific settings in GarageBand. A few months before his death, Peep relocated to London along with iLoveMakonnen, and the duo recorded songs that sounded far brighter than his life situation at the time.

Smokeasac, a longtime collaborator and producer of Peep's, received the laptop that Peep would record on with GarageBand-recorded multitracks and would begin the mixing process in Northleach, England. Astasio, a frequent collaborator for Peep, would also return to work on the production process. Additionally, Rob Cavallo, who worked with Smokeasac before Astasio, also assisted in the process. The production process was the first time that Smokeasac worked with other producers, and Smokeasac would move overseas along with ILoveMakonnen. Smokeasac would dictate the overall feel and essence of the album, while Astasio would "[help] sandpaper [the songs] into shape." Smokeasac would describe the process as extremely hard and one of his most important projects.

Peep's mother, Liza Womack, was involved in the production process and was played certain tracks by Smokeasac and ILoveMakonnen from Pt. 2: "Runaway", "Sex With My Ex", "Broken Smile", and "Cry Alone". However, she chose not to intervene heavily during production: "[My role] was really a background, sort of mom role. Like I would have done with Gus."

== Music and lyrics ==
As was the case on previous records, Come Over When You're Sober, Pt. 2 is built on a brooding mixture of hip-hop, emo, and pop punk. However, the album is less abrasive and bombastic in comparison to its predecessors. Whereas his previous releases featured him rapping over gothic trap beats and harsh, swelling guitars, the sophomore album gravitates more towards Lil Peep's somber tendencies. Its musical compositions are predominately driven by alternative-rock guitar and moaning backing vocals. The songs express mid-tempo guitar riffs written in minor-key and composed into four-note melodies. They serve to complement the melancholic vibe of its lyrical content. The dysphoric record production is drenched in reverberation and low-pass filters, giving the tracks a cinematic atmosphere. Lil Peep vocal style features his signature blend of singing and rapping. He sings evocative lines laced with visceral melodies in a plainspoken voice. His monotone delivery ranges from urgent to longing to lamentful, often lapsing into crooning for hooks.

Lyrically, Come Over When You're Sober, Pt. 2 centers around the topic of death, primarily the one Lil Peep envisions for himself. Peep's songwriting continues down his lane of honest, vulnerable lyrical themes as the album's subject matter harbors reflections on heartbreak and addiction. Its dark lyrical concerns are insular, immersed in self-loathing and contemplations of death and suicide. Lil Peep frequently ruminates the concept of his death through song, obsessively documenting thoughts on his inevitable passing. Moverover, the album's emotive lyrical content radiates with a plainspoken depiction of deep depression. His lyrical approach involves bleak accounts of a harrowing and hopeless struggle. Throughout the album, there are moments that demonstrate Lil Peep's relationship with self-expression and self-destruction. His songwriting touches on intimacy and codependency in relationships as well as issues with substance abuse, with lyrics that are often wry, deadpan and emphatic. He places banalities alongside poignant observations, emulating the dynamics of actual conversation.

=== Songs ===
Come Over When You're Sober, Pt. 2 opens with "Broken Smile (My All)", a cinematic opener with the intro taken from Peep's feature on "UNBREAKABLE" by Craig Xen. Like the rest of the album, the song includes Peep's characteristic use of alternative-rock styled guitar. On the song Peep discusses his feelings of emptiness and melancholy along with "ghostly" keys, with reviewer Jayson Greene of Pitchfork noting that it is "drowned in sadness." "Runaway" discusses "fake" people that surround Peep and includes the repetition of the line "I was dying and nobody was there" alongside Smokeasac's "dark, guitar-driven production." On "Sex With My Ex" Peep juxtaposes more aggressive lines with tender ones, modeling genuine conversation. "Cry Alone" has Peep discussing ambivalence towards his hometown against a grunge chord progression, which Fred Thomas of AllMusic labeled a standout track; Charles Holmes of Rolling Stone labeled these three tracks the album's standout point.

"Leanin'" addresses Peep's suicide attempt and his indifference to surviving it, while "16 Lines" unpacks Peep's thoughts on his dependency on cocaine; the title serves as a double entendre. Luke Hinz of HotNewHipHop notes the "harrowing" lyric of ""Is anybody out there? / Can anybody hear me?" in the latter. "Life is Beautiful" addresses hardships that Peep has faced in his life—Hinz states that line such as "When I die, I'll pack my bags, move somewhere more affordable" show his devastatingly ironic sense of humor. The track also addresses cancer and police brutality. "Hate Me" leans into Peep's pop punk influences and discusses his feelings of inadequacy, and "IDGAF" resembles his older songs, with Hinz commenting that the guitar lick is reminiscent of Metallica. "White Girl" discusses Peep's feelings toward having sex with someone who doesn't love him back and contains continued references to cocaine. "Fingers", the album's closing track, contains a use of synthesizer and guitar with the line "I'm not gonna last long" serving as its ending.

== Release and promotion ==
The only delay to the release of Come Over When You're Sober, Pt. 2 was Peep's death in November 2017. Columbia Records acquired his unreleased material, including all of the material for Pt. 2, in April 2018. On October 15, 2018, Peep's estate posted an image of a pink cassette tape containing the name of the album to Instagram. The album was officially announced on October 18 of the same year, with Peep's mother, Liza Womack, writing that "it's just what we all would have expected from Gus." The album was announced through a music video for the single "Cry Alone"—the video revealed the release date of November 9, 2018. Womack spoke during a listening party held by Columbia Records on October 19, stating that the album was "what [Peep] would've wanted." She furthermore called the album a model for future posthumous releases from other artists.

A documentary to accompany the album was announced by Peep's estate in a New York Times article written by Jon Caramanica. It would be produced by Terrence Malick, best known for directing the films Badlands, Days of Heaven and The Thin Red Line. The documentary may have an additional soundtrack in addition to Come Over When You're Sober, Pt. 2.

=== Singles ===
On October 17, 2018, Lil Peep's estate confirmed on his social media that the lead single off the album, "Cry Alone", would be released on October 18. The day of the single release, the estate confirmed a release date for the album of November 9, 2018. A "Cry Alone" video shot in May 2017 in San Francisco by Max Beck was released the same day as the single. Two weeks later, the second single, "Runaway", was officially released on what would've been Lil Peep's 22nd birthday on November 1, 2018. The accompanying video was directed by Steven Mertens and Womack, Lil Peep's mother. On November 7, 2018, the third single "Life is Beautiful" was released. Originally featured on the 2015 Feelz EP, the song was remixed by Smokeasac and IIVI. The accompanying video features a younger Peep recording of him singing the song to a webcam.

The album's lead single, "Falling Down" was released on September 19, 2018, being announced by Lil Peep and XXXTentacion's mothers. XXXTentacion's mother, Cleopatra Bernard, uploaded the preview on Instagram, captioning it with "From Peep's mom and I".

== Come Over When You're Sober, Pt. 2 (OG Version) ==
Celebrating the album's five-year anniversary, the album was re-released on November 10, 2023, in its original form (under the name "Come Over When You're Sober, Pt. 2 [og version]"). Peep's estate announced the release of this album stating that they discovered Peep's original vision for the album from conversations with Smokeasac, stating "These songs were exported directly from Gus's [Peep's] GarageBand sessions on his computer in the highest audio quality possible."

== Critical reception ==
Professional ratings
Aggregate scores
Source	Rating
AnyDecentMusic?	7.3/10
Metacritic	79/100
Review scores
Source	Rating
AllMusic	4/5 stars
The Guardian	4/5 stars
Highsnobiety	3.5/5 stars
HipHopDX	3.8/5
HotNewHipHop	82/100
NME	4/5 stars
Northern Transmissions	7/10
The Observer	4/5 stars
Pitchfork	7.2/10
Rolling Stone	3.5/5 stars

According to the review aggregator Metacritic, Come Over When You're Sober, Pt. 2 received "generally favorable reviews" based on a weighted average score of 79 out of 100 from seven critic scores. Aggregator AnyDecentMusic? gave the album 7.3/10, based on their assessment of the critical consensus.

Writing for Pitchfork and rating the album a 7.2 out of 10, Jayson Greene stated that "the first posthumous album from Lil Peep stands as an act of tribute and preservation for an artist whose legacy is still very fragile." Greene hailed Peep's ear for melodies and "bone-chilling" lyrics. Charles Holmes of Rolling Stone described the album as "a requiem for who Gustav "Gus" Elijah Åhr was and an examination of the musician he could've been, and was becoming." Holmes praised the production of Smokeasac and Astasio, but panned "White Girl" and "Falling Down", and Peep's repetitive vocal delivery. Dhruva Balram of British music journal NME gave the album a rating of 4 out of 5 stars and stated the project "evokes feelings of alienation, of loneliness, of feeling like you're never good enough. The sombre project is blistered and broken in all the right ways."

Several reviewers noted the impact on Peep's legacy the album holds, and its significance to Generation Z. The Observer's review comments on how the album "suggests mainstream success was – and perhaps still is – well within Lil Peep's grasp." Balram said that album showcases Peep's "uncanny ability to relate to an entire generation." Luke Hinz of HotNewHipHop noted the album's candid discussion of mental health, which in turn "provides a sanctuary and outlet for those dealing with many of the same ailments." Highsnobiety noted his impact on the emo rap genre, declaring the album a "time capsule of talent" and that the future of the genre "lies in the lessons we can learn from him."

== Commercial performance ==
Come Over When You're Sober, Pt. 2 debuted at number four on the US Billboard 200 with 81,000 album-equivalent units (including 43,000 pure album sales), making it Lil Peep's first US top 10 album. The album reached number one in numerous other countries, namely Estonia, Finland, Latvia, and Lithuania. The album was certified platinum by the Recording Industry Association of America (RIAA) on February 21, 2022.

== Track listing ==
Come Over When You're Sober, Pt. 2
No.	Title	Writer(s)	Producer(s)	Length
1.	"Broken Smile (My All)"	Gustav Åhr; Dylan Mullen; Jason Pebworth; George Astasio; Jon Shave	Smokeasac; IIVI	4:40
2.	"Runaway"	Åhr; Mullen; Drew Fulk; Steve Choi	Smokeasac	3:12
3.	"Sex with My Ex"	Åhr; Mullen; Shane Mullen	Smokeasac; 66swords	3:33
4.	"Cry Alone"	Åhr; Mullen; Pebworth; Astasio; Shave	Smokeasac; IIVI	2:47
5.	"Leanin'"	Åhr; Mullen; Pebworth; Astasio; Shave; Benjamin Friars-Funkhouser	Smokeasac; IIVI	3:26
6.	"16 Lines"	Åhr; Mullen; Pebworth; Astasio; Shave; Choi	Smokeasac; IIVI	4:04
7.	"Life Is Beautiful"	Åhr; Mullen; Pebworth; Astasio; Shave	Smokeasac; IIVI	3:27
8.	"Hate Me"	Åhr; Mullen; Pebworth; Astasio; Shave; Lars Stalfors	Smokeasac; IIVI; Stalfors	3:00
9.	"IDGAF"	Åhr; Mullen; Pebworth; Astasio; Shave	Smokeasac; IIVI	3:34
10.	"White Girl"	Åhr; Mullen; Pebworth; Astasio; Shave	Smokeasac; IIVI	3:21
11.	"Fingers"	Åhr; D. Mullen; S. Mullen; Fulk	Smokeasac	3:02
Total length:				38:06

Deluxe edition bonus tracks
No.	Title	Writer(s)	Producer(s)	Length
12.	"Falling Down" (with XXXTentacion)	Åhr; Jahseh Onfroy; Valentin Leon Blavatnik; Makonnen Sheran; Michael Williams II; Aaron Jackson	John Cunningham; Scott Theft; Mike Will Made It; IIVI^{[a]}	3:18
13.	"Sunlight on Your Skin" ("Falling Down" original version)" (with iLoveMakonnen)	Åhr; Blavatnik; Sheran; Williams II; Jackson	John Cunningham; Scott Theft; Mike Will Made It; IIVI^{[a]}	3:20
Total length:				44:44

Original Version
No.	Title	Writer(s)	Producer(s)	Length
1.	"Broken Smile"	Åhr; Mullen	Smokeasac	2:41
2.	"Runaway"	Åhr; Mullen	Smokeasac	2:50
3.	"Sex With My Ex"	Åhr; Mullen	Smokeasac	2:06
4.	"Cry Alone"	Åhr; Mullen; Pebworth	Smokeasac; IIVI	2:04
5.	"Leanin"	Åhr; Mullen; Friars-Funkhouser	Smokeasac; Fish Narc	2:15
6.	"Sixteen Lines"	Åhr; Mullen	Smokeasac	2:50
7.	"IDGAF"	Åhr; Mullen	Smokeasac	2:52
8.	"White Girl"	Åhr; Mullen	Smokeasac	2:53
9.	"Fingers"	Åhr; Mullen	Smokeasac	2:48
10.	"In The Car"	Åhr; Mullen	Smokeasac	2:09
Total length:				25:32

Notes

- ^{^[a]} signifies an additional producer
- ^{^[b]} signifies an uncredited co-producer
- The Original Version is stylized in lower case, with all tracks excluding "In The Car" featuring the note "(og version)".

== Charts ==
Chart (2018)	Peak position
Australian Albums (ARIA)	15
Austrian Albums (Ö3 Austria)	17
Belgian Albums (Ultratop Flanders)	21
Belgian Albums (Ultratop Wallonia)	62
Canadian Albums (Billboard)	3
Czech Albums (ČNS IFPI)	4
Danish Albums (Hitlisten)	12
Dutch Albums (Album Top 100)	21
Estonian Albums (Eesti Ekspress)	1
Finnish Albums (Suomen virallinen lista)	1
French Albums (SNEP)	57
German Albums (Offizielle Top 100)	26
Irish Albums (IRMA)	12
Italian Albums (FIMI)	31
Latvian Albums (LAIPA)	1
Lithuanian Albums (AGATA)	1
New Zealand Albums (RMNZ)	9
Norwegian Albums (VG-lista)	4
Polish Albums (ZPAV)	19
Scottish Albums (Official Charts)	67
Slovak Albums (ČNS IFPI)	6
Swedish Albums (Sverigetopplistan)	3
Swiss Albums (Schweizer Hitparade)	38
UK Albums (Official Charts)	19
US Billboard 200	4

== Certifications ==
Region	Certification	Certified units/sales
Brazil (Pro-Música Brasil)	Gold	20,000^{‡}
Canada (Music Canada)	Gold	40,000^{‡}
Denmark (IFPI Danmark)	Gold	10,000^{‡}
France (SNEP)	Gold	50,000^{‡}
Germany (BVMI)	Gold	100,000^{‡}
Italy (FIMI)	Gold	25,000^{‡}
New Zealand (RMNZ)	Gold	7,500^{‡}
Poland (ZPAV)	2× Platinum	40,000^{‡}
United Kingdom (BPI)	Gold	100,000^{‡}
United States (RIAA)	Platinum	1,000,000^{‡}
^{‡} Sales+streaming figures based on certification alone.
