= Everybody's Everything (film) =

2019 documentary film

- Theatrical release poster
- Directed by: Sebastian Jones; Ramez Silyan
- Produced by: Benjamin Soley
- Edited by: Kyle Seaquist; Sebastian Jones
- Music by: Lil Peep; Patrick Stump
- Distributed by: Gunpowder & Sky
- Release dates: March 10, 2019 (SXSW); November 12, 2019 (United States)
- Running time: 116 minutes
- Box office: $741,515

Everybody's Everything is a 2019 documentary film about the life of American rapper Lil Peep. The film was directed by Sebastian Jones and Ramez Silyan, produced by Benjamin Soley and executive produced by Terrence Malick, Liza Womack and Sarah Stennett. It chronicles the life of Lil Peep from his childhood in Long Beach, NY through his meteoric rise in the underground scene and music industry, up to his death at age 21 on November 15, 2017. The film takes its title from one of Lil Peep's Instagram posts, which appeared the day before his death. “I just wanna be everybody's everything," he wrote. The documentary is described as a "humanistic portrait that seeks to understand an artist who attempted to be all things to all people."

The film had its world premiere at South by Southwest on March 10, 2019 and was released by Gunpowder & Sky for one-night worldwide fan screenings on November 12 ahead of its theatrical release on November 15, 2019.

A companion album of the same name was released by Columbia Records alongside the film on November 15, 2019.

== Cast ==
Credits adapted from Rotten Tomatoes.

- Lil Peep (archival footage)
- Ghostemane
- Horse Head
- Juicy J
- Post Malone
- Rob Cavallo
- Smokeasac
- ILoveMakonnen
- Bighead
- Lil Tracy
- Fish Narc
- JGRXXN
- Mackned
- John Womack
- Liza Womack
- Yawns

== Reception ==
On review aggregator Rotten Tomatoes, the film holds an approval rating of 100% based on 21 reviews, with an average rating of 7.4/10. Metacritic, which uses a weighted average, assigned the film a score of 73 out of 100, based on 6 critics, indicating "Generally favorable reviews".

IndieWire listed the film as one of the ten best Film and TV projects at SXSW and Variety included it in its top twelve of the festival. The rapper Drake called the film "genius" in an interview with Rap Radar and Justin Staple of Vice named it "The Defining Document of the SoundCloud Rap Generation."

The Playlist's Ryan Oliver writes: "Having only witnessed the quick meteoric rise of Lil Peep in the peripherals as it was unfolding, Everybody’s Everything is a loving tribute for fans as well as those unfamiliar. And for the latter, the doc truly creates a sense of humanity, awe, and undeniable raw talent that it makes it easy to see why his music connected with so many people in such a quick amount time." David Ehrlich of IndieWire called the film "a riveting and hypnotic sanctification of the late musician." David Fear of Rolling Stone described it as "a hard film to watch, and an even harder one to look away from. But it needs to be seen." Many critics have also noted the unique use of letters written to Peep by his grandfather John Womack throughout the film. Variety's Andrew Barker called them "heartbreakingly poetic" and said of the ending "the film snaps back into stunning focus during its epilogue, where Peep’s grandfather Womack, previously only heard in voiceover, is allowed to speak at length. Unfazed by all the face tattoos and calculated outrageousness that accompanied his grandson’s artistic persona, Womack clearly never stopped seeing Peep as his little boy, and his quiet ruminations on mortality and manhood land with shattering force."

== See also ==
- Juice Wrld: Into the Abyss
- Look at Me (2022 film)
- Everybody's Everything (album)
