= Benz Truck (gelik) =

2017 song by Lil Peep

"Benz Truck (гелик)"

Single by Lil Peep

from the album Come Over When You're Sober, Pt. 1
- Released: June 9, 2017
- Genre: Emo rap
- Length: 2:39
- Label: First Access
- Songwriters: Gustav Åhr; Dylan Mullen; Juan Alderete; Rob Cavallo
- Producer: Smokeasac

Lil Peep singles chronology
"No Respect Freestyle" (2017)	"Benz Truck (гелик)" (2017)	"The Brightside" (2017)

Music video
- "Benz Truck" on YouTube

"Benz Truck (гелик)", also known as "Benz Truck" or "Benz Truck (gelik)", is a song by American rapper Lil Peep. It was released on June 9, 2017, as the lead single from his debut studio album, Come Over When You're Sober, Pt. 1. The track was written by Gustav Åhr, Juan Alderete, Rob Cavallo, and Dylan Mullen, who also handled the production.

== Composition ==
The beat was created by Lil Peep's frequent collaborator Smokeasac, with contributions from Green Day's producer Rob Cavallo and bassist Juan Alderete. The production of "Benz Truck" features Lil Peep's "signature emo guitars tangled up with trap hi-hats", and melancholic vocals.

== Music video ==
The music video, directed by Mezzy, Sus Boy and Wizzy, was released onto YouTube on June 9, 2017. It was filmed in multiple locations, including Venice Beach, Moscow and Cotswolds. The video features Russian subtitles for the song's lyrics.

== Charts ==
Weekly chart performance for "Benz Truck (гелик)"
Chart (2017)	Peak position
Czech Republic Singles Digital (ČNS IFPI)	39

== Certifications ==
Certifications for "Benz Truck (гелик)"
Region	Certification	Certified units/sales
Australia (ARIA)	Gold	35,000^{‡}
New Zealand (RMNZ)	Platinum	30,000^{‡}
United Kingdom (BPI)	Silver	200,000^{‡}
United States (RIAA)	Platinum	1,000,000^{‡}
^{‡} Sales+streaming figures based on certification alone.

== "Benz Truck, Pt. 2" ==
"Benz Truck, Pt. 2"

Single by Lil Peep
- Released: September 25, 2017
- Genre: Emo rap; cloud rap
- Length: 2:00
- Label: Self-released
- Songwriters: Gustav Åhr; Dylan Mullen; Brendan Murray
- Producers: Smokeasac; Bighead

"Benz Truck, Pt. 2" is a song by American rapper Lil Peep. It was released onto Bighead's SoundCloud account on September 25, 2017, and serves as a sequel to Lil Peep's earlier track "Benz Truck (гелик)". It marks his first song since the release of his debut studio album, Come Over When You're Sober, Pt. 1.

=== Composition ===
Build on a guitar beat, the song features lyrics about numbing pain with drugs and references the title's "Benz truck".
