= Bourton-on-the-Water railway station =

Former railway station in Gloucestershire, England

Bourton-on-the-Water
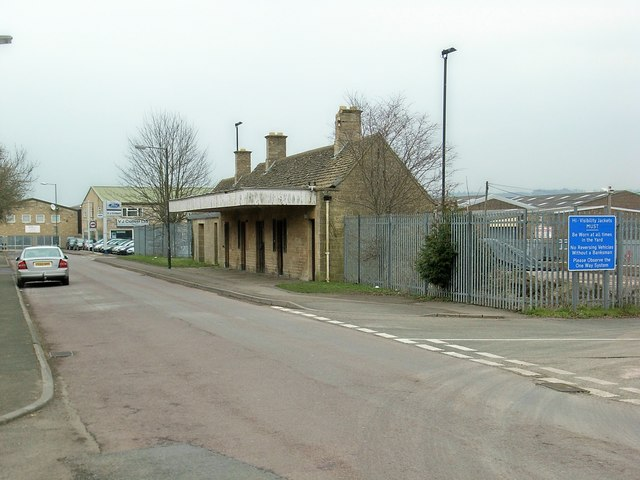
- Bourton-on-the-Water railway station in 2007

General information
- Location: Bourton-on-the-Water, Cotswold; England
- Coordinates: 51.8905932°N 1.7563591°W
- Platforms: 2

Other information
- Status: Disused

History
- Original company: Bourton-on-the-Water Railway
- Pre-grouping: Great Western Railway
- Post-grouping: Great Western Railway; Western Region of British Railways

Key dates
- 1 March 1862: Station opens
- 15 October 1962: Closed to passengers
- 7 September 1964: Goods facilities withdrawn
Location

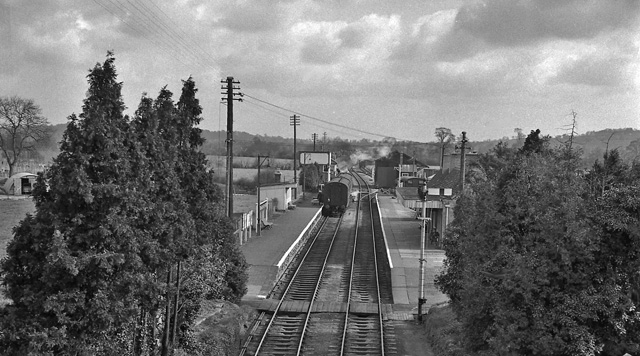
The station in 1961

Bourton-on-the-Water railway station was a Gloucestershire railway station on the Great Western Railway's Banbury and Cheltenham Direct Railway which opened in 1881 and closed in 1964.

== History ==
The Bourton-on-the-Water railway station was situated just to the north of the village and served surrounding villages like Lower Slaughter. It was rebuilt in 1936 by the Chief Architect to the Great Western Railway, Percy Emerson Culverhouse. The station was host to a GWR camp coach in 1935, 1938 and 1939.

The station passed on to the Western Region of British Railways on nationalisation in 1948. The last passenger service to the station was on 13 October 1962. Goods services between the station and Cheltenham ceased in 1962 with the service between Bourton and Kingham closing in 1964.

=== Stationmasters ===
- George Spreckley ca. 1863
- Edward Jackson Cuff 1864 - 1866 (afterwards station master at Moreton-in-Marsh)
- Charles William Caldicot 1868 - 1871
- George Pope ca. 1879 ca. 1891
- Robert Eaton from 1893
- William L. Mills until 1897
- George Christopher Anney 1897 - 1904 (formerly station master at Leckhampton, afterwards station master at Moreton-in-Marsh)
- William Henry Penson 1905 - 1917 (afterwards station master at Brinscombe)
- F.C. Price
- William Albert Mace 1922 - 1929
- N.J. Fletcher from 1929
- W. May until 1934
- H.E. Spencer from 1934

== Present day ==
Following closure, the station was used as a highways depot by Gloucestershire County Council. The (last) station building, built in the 1930s, was demolished in 2011.

The Gloucestershire Warwickshire Railway had considered reusing the building at its Broadway railway station, but later changed its mind.

Preceding station	Disused railways	Following station
Notgrove; Line and station closed	Great Western Railway; Banbury and Cheltenham Direct Railway	Stow-on-the-Wold; Line and station closed
