= Northleach with Eastington =

Civil parish in Gloucestershire, England

Coordinates: 51°49′20″N 1°49′20″W

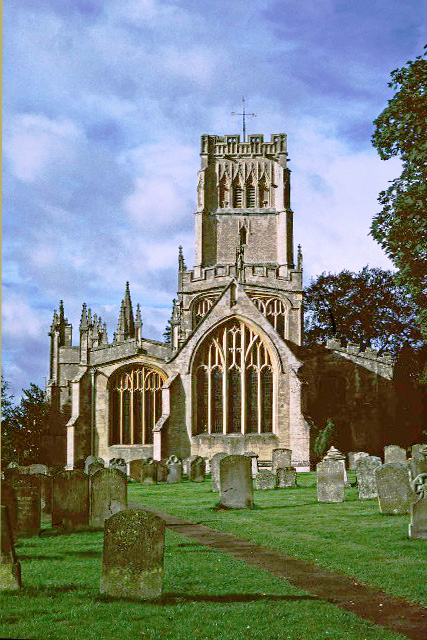
Northleach church

Northleach with Eastington is a civil parish in the English county of Gloucestershire that includes the town of Northleach and the hamlet of Eastington, about 1 1/2 miles SE of the town.

It forms part of the Cotswold district.

== History ==
The parish was formed on 1 April 1935 from the parishes of "Northleach" and "Eastington" and part of Hampnett.

== Freedom of the Town ==
The following people and military units have received the Freedom of the Town of Northleach with Eastington.

=== Individuals ===
- Christopher Hancock: 24 April 2019.
