= Sebastian Jones (filmmaker) =

American film director, screenwriter and editor

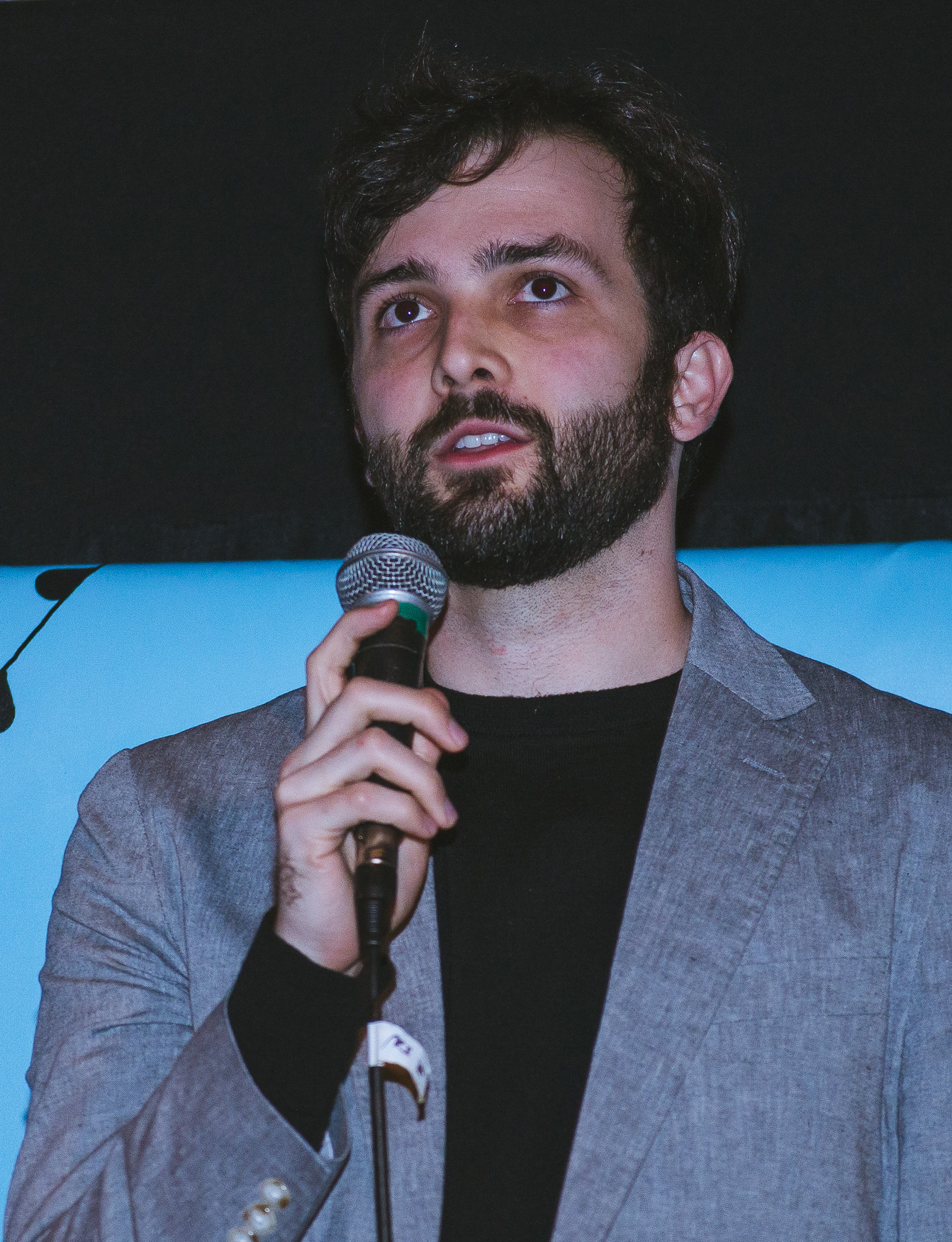
- Jones in 2019
- Occupations: Film director; screenwriter; editor
- Notable work: Everybody's Everything
- Website: sebastian-jones.com

Sebastian N. Jones is an American film director, screenwriter, and editor. He is best known for his documentary film Everybody's Everything (2019), which chronicles the life of Lil Peep. Jones is a frequent collaborator and protégé of Terrence Malick.

== Life and career ==
Jones grew up in South Florida and studied film at the University of Central Florida before moving to Austin, Texas to work with Terrence Malick. He worked as an editor and eventually associate producer on Malick projects like Knight of Cups starring Christian Bale and Song to Song with Ryan Gosling and Cate Blanchett. He was also an editor on Voyage of Time and A Hidden Life.

In 2017, after seeing Lil Peep perform in Austin, Texas., Jones became interested in casting him in a feature film. Instead, Peep died just a few days later, and Jones was later tapped by Malick to co-direct a posthumous documentary on Peep's life. While researching for the film, Jones came across an Instagram post, which Peep published the day before his death, captioned: "I just wana be everybody's everything." This led to the film's title Everybody's Everything. The film premiered at South by Southwest in March 2019 to critical acclaim. It was acquired by Gunpowder & Sky and released later that year.

Jones has described his approach as mixing documentary and narrative elements.
