= Awful Things =

Single by Lil Peep featuring Lil Tracy

from the album Come Over When You're Sober, Pt. 1
- Released: July 27, 2017
- Recorded: 2017
- Genre: Emo rap; trap; pop-punk; rap rock; screamo
- Length: 3:34
- Label: First Access
- Songwriters: Gustav Elijah Åhr; George Astasio; Jason Pebworth; Jon Shave; Michael Blackburn; Jazz Butler
- Producers: Smokeasac; IIVI

Lil Peep singles chronology
"The Brightside" (2017)	"Awful Things" (2017)	"Save That Shit" (2017)

Lil Tracy singles chronology
"Heaven/Hell" (2017)	"Awful Things" (2018)	"Still" (2018)

Audio sample
- file; help

Music video
- "Awful Things" on YouTube

"Awful Things" is a song by American rapper Lil Peep featuring fellow American rapper Lil Tracy from his first studio album, Come Over When You're Sober, Pt. 1 (2017). It was released as the third single from the album on July 28, 2017. The track was produced by Smokeasac and IIVI, and written by George Astasio, Jason Pebworth, Jon Shave, Michael Blackburn and the artists themselves. The song is Lil Peep's third highest charting single in the United States, peaking at number 79 on the Billboard Hot 100 following his death on November 15, 2017.

== Critical reception ==
The song was listed by Billboard as one of the seven best tracks from Peep's discography. With author John Norris referring to song as a "sing-along anthem".

== Chart performance ==
In the United States, following Lil Peep's death, "Awful Things" debuted at number 79 on the Billboard Hot 100 in the week beginning December 9, 2017, becoming Lil Peep's highest charting song in the country, gaining 8.4 million streams and selling 3,000 downloads according to Nielsen Music, in the week ending November 23, 2017. The song later fell off the Hot 100, in the following week.

In Canada, the song debuted at number 58 on the Canadian Hot 100 alongside "Save That Shit", in the week beginning December 9, 2017, where it became Lil Peep's highest charting song in the country. It later fell to number 98 the following week beginning on December 16, 2017. The song later dropped out of the chart on the week beginning December 23, 2017, spending a total of two weeks on the Canadian Hot 100.

== Music video ==
The music video for "Awful Things" premiered on August 17, 2017. It was directed by Sus Boy & Nick Koenig, and produced by Daniel Ostroff. The video's director of photography was C.J. Brion, with Olivia Stiglich being the story writer and Graeme Barrett, acting as the creative consultant. It has surpassed 260 million views on YouTube as of August 2023.

== Cover version ==
American band Good Charlotte performed a cover of the song on December 2, 2017, during Peep's memorial service in Long Beach, New York. A studio recording of the cover was later officially released on December 22, 2017, through MDDN Records.

== Charts ==
=== Weekly charts ===
Chart (2017)	Peak position
Canada Hot 100 (Billboard)	58
Latvia (DigiTop100)	25
US Billboard Hot 100	79

== Certifications ==
Region	Certification	Certified units/sales
Australia (ARIA)	Gold	35,000^{‡}
New Zealand (RMNZ)	Gold	15,000^{‡}
United Kingdom (BPI)	Silver	200,000^{‡}
United States (RIAA)	2× Platinum	2,000,000^{‡}
^{‡} Sales+streaming figures based on certification alone.
