= Life Is Beautiful (Lil Peep song) =

"Life is Beautiful"

Single by Lil Peep

from the album Come Over When You're Sober, Pt. 2
- Released: November 7, 2018
- Recorded: 2015
- Genre: Emo rap; cloud rap
- Length: 3:27
- Label: AUTNMY; Columbia Records
- Songwriters: Gustav Åhr; George Astasio; Jason Pebworth; Jon Shave; Dylan Mullen
- Producers: Smokeasac; IIVI

Lil Peep singles chronology
| "Runaway" (2018) | "Life is Beautiful" (2018) | "I've Been Waiting" (2019) |

Music video
- "Life is Beautiful" on YouTube

"Life is Beautiful" is a song by American rapper Lil Peep from his second studio album, Come Over When You're Sober, Pt. 2. The song was released posthumously as a single on November 7, 2018 by AUTNMY through Columbia Records. It was written alongside producers Smokeasac and IIVI.

== Background ==
Originally featured on the Feelz EP (2015) under the title "Life", the song was later remixed by Smokeasac and IIVI, and released posthumously as the fifth single from Lil Peep's second studio album, Come Over When You're Sober, Pt. 2. The updated production features synths, synthetic cello, and trap drums, giving the track a more polished sound. It was premiered as a World Record on Zane Lowe's Beats 1 show.

== Music video ==
The music video, directed by Mezzy, was recorded in Long Beach, New York in 2015, and released onto YouTube on November 7, 2018. It was shot by Will Siberfeld and features animations from Bryson Michael. The music video received over 1.7 million views within hours of its release.

== Charts ==
Weekly chart performance for "Life is Beautiful"
| Chart (2018) | Peak position |
|---|---|
| Czech Republic (Singles Digitál Top 100) | 10 |
| New Zealand Hot Singles (RMNZ) | 6 |
| Swedish Heatseeker (Sverigetopplistan) | 2 |
| UK Singles (OCC) | 87 |
| US Bubbling Under Hot 100 (Billboard) | 4 |

== Certifications ==
Certifications for "Life is Beautiful"
| Region | Certification | Certified units/sales |
|---|---|---|
| New Zealand (RMNZ) | Gold | 15,000^{‡} |
| Poland (ZPAV) | Gold | 25,000^{‡} |
| United Kingdom (BPI) | Silver | 200,000^{‡} |
| United States (RIAA) | Platinum | 1,000,000^{‡} |
^{‡} Sales+streaming figures based on certification alone.
