= Cold Aston =

Village in Gloucestershire, England

Coordinates: 51°52′33″N 1°48′50″W

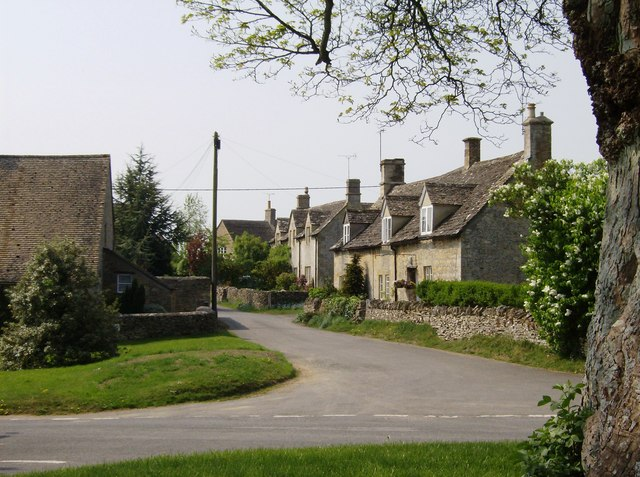
- Cottages in Cold Aston

- Location within Gloucestershire
- Area: 3.71 sq mi (9.6 km^{2})
- Population: 255
  - Density: 69/sq mi (27/km^{2})
  - London: 77 miles (124 km)
- Civil parish: Cold Aston
- District: Cotswold
- Shire county: Gloucestershire
- Region: South West
- Country: England
- Sovereign state: United Kingdom
- Post town: CHELTENHAM
- Postcode district: GL54
- Dialling code: 01451
- Police: Gloucestershire
- Fire: Gloucestershire
- Ambulance: South Western
- UK Parliament: North Cotswolds

Cold Aston (also known as Aston Blank) is a village and civil parish in the Cotswold district, in Gloucestershire, England, approximately 18 miles (29 km) to the east of Gloucester. It lies in the Cotswolds, an Area of Outstanding Natural Beauty. The 2011 census gives the population of the civil parish as 255.

== History ==
=== Toponymy ===
The village was recorded as Eastunæ between 716–43. It was listed in the Domesday Book of 1086 as Estone, the name coming from the Old English ēast + tūn meaning "eastern farmstead or estate". By the mid 13th century, the village was known as Cold Aston. It was occasionally called Great Aston, to distinguish it from the nearby hamlet of Little Aston. From the 16th century, the name Aston Blank took hold, the suffix "Blank" possibly deriving from the Old French word blanc, meaning "white" or "bare". In 1972, the parish officially became known as Cold Aston again. Some think that the name "cold" is derived from the Saxon word which refers to a former settlement – in this case, probably referring to a disused Roman camp or rest place for use when travelling the Fosse Way. It is fairly certain, contrary to common modern thinking, that the word "Cold" is not a meteorological reference.

== Governance ==
Cold Aston is part of the Bourton-on-the-Water ward of the district of Cotswold. It is within the constituency of North Cotswolds, represented in parliament by Conservative MP Sir Geoffrey Clifton-Brown. It was part of the South West England constituency of the European Parliament prior to Britain leaving the European Union in January 2020.

== Geography ==
Cold Aston is in the county of Gloucestershire and lies within the Cotswolds, a range of hills designated an Area of Outstanding Natural Beauty. It is approximately 18 miles (29 km) to the east of Gloucester. It is approximately 11 miles (18 km) east of its post town Cheltenham and about 2 1/2 miles (4.0 km) west of Bourton-on-the-Water. Nearby villages include Turkdean, Notgrove, Clapton, Naunton and Lower Slaughter. The ancient parish of Cold Ashton contained 2,360 acres (3.69 sq mi; 9.6 km^{2}) and was roughly square in shape, in 1987 the parish was enlarged.

== Landmarks ==
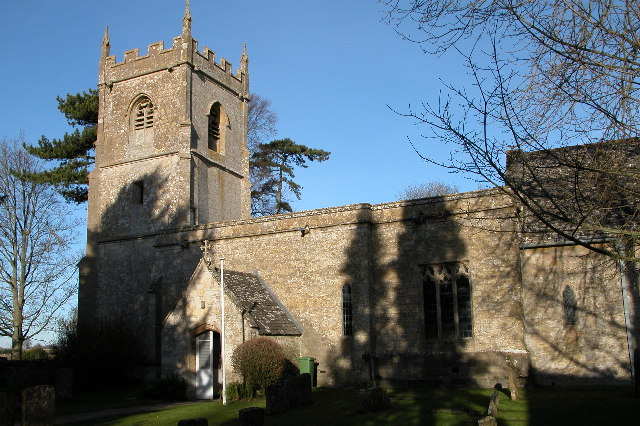
St Andrew's Church

The Church of St Andrew is the Church of England parish church. It is a largely Norman building, though its walls incorporate Saxon stonework and the original church on this site may have been built in around AD 904. In the 1970s a leading authority commented that "all is evidently the work of the best Cotswold masons, and is the fifteenth-century aggrandisement of a Norman church". Much of the present church was restored in 1875.

The village pub, The Plough, is a 17th-century Grade II listed building. It is the only pub between the three villages of Cold Aston, Turkdean and Notgrove. In May 2013 it re-opened after an extensive refurbishment and now offers accommodation. The pub's landlord claims that it has a ghost named Old Harry.

== Education ==
Cold Aston Church of England Primary School is a voluntary controlled school for children from the age of 4–11. In 2019, the school had 87 pupils. Gloucestershire Archives hold school records going back to 1879.
