= Thames River Multi Hedge PCC =

Thames River Multi Hedge PCC (LSE: TRMU) was a large British hedge fund based in Guernsey. It was listed on the London Stock Exchange until it was placed in liquidation in 2013.

== History ==
The company was formed as a Protected Cell Company ('PCC') in 2004. It intended to raise over £200 million through a new share issue in 2008, but it actually managed to raise only £106.6 million. It joined the FTSE 250 Index in September 2008, but was placed in liquidation in 2013. It was managed by Thames River Capital and the Chairman was William Backhouse.
