= Turkdean =

Village in Gloucestershire, England

Coordinates: 51.8568°N 1.8447°W

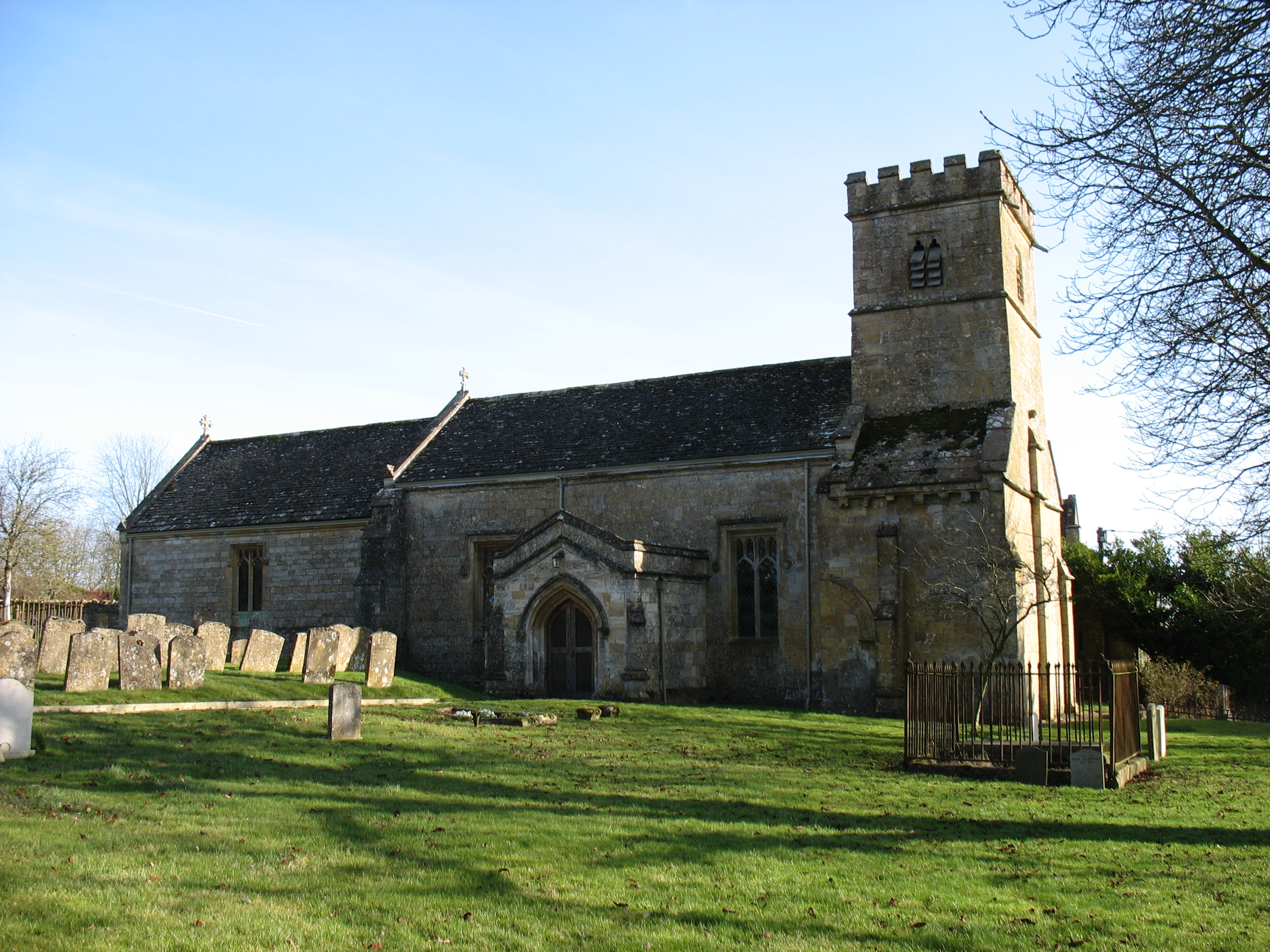
- Church of All Saints

- Location within Gloucestershire
- Civil parish: Turkdean
- District: Cotswold
- Shire county: Gloucestershire
- Region: South West
- Country: England
- Sovereign state: United Kingdom
- Post town: CHELTENHAM
- Postcode district: GL54
- Dialling code: 01451
- Police: Gloucestershire
- Fire: Gloucestershire
- Ambulance: South Western
- UK Parliament: North Cotswolds

Turkdean is a village and civil parish in Gloucestershire, England, approximately 30 km (19 mi) to the east of Gloucester. It lies in the Cotswolds, an Area of Outstanding Natural Beauty.

== History ==
Turkdean was recorded as Turcandene in the 8th century and was listed as Turchedene or Turghedene in the Domesday Book of 1086. It derives from the Old English for "valley (denu) of a river called Turce", with Turce or Twrch being a lost Celtic river name, possibly meaning boar.

The Anglican Church of All Saints was built in the 12th century. It is a grade I listed building.

== Governance ==
Turkdean is part of the Sandywell ward of the district of Cotswold, represented by one councillor. It is within the North Cotswolds constituency, represented in parliament by Conservative MP Geoffrey Clifton-Brown. Prior to Brexit in 2020, it was part of the South West England constituency of the European Parliament.

== Geography ==
Turkdean is in the county of Gloucestershire and lies within the Cotswolds, a range of hills designated an Area of Outstanding Natural Beauty. It is approximately 30 km (19 mi) to the east of Gloucester. It is approximately 21 km (13 mi) east of its post town Cheltenham and about 8 km (5.0 mi) south-west of Bourton-on-the-Water. The southeastern boundary follows the route of the Roman road the Fosse Way. Nearby villages include Cold Aston, Hazleton, Clapton, Farmington and Hampnett.

== In popular culture ==
In the 1981 film Raiders of the Lost Ark, Harrison Ford's character, archaeologist Indiana Jones, mentions the Neolithic barrow at Turkdean, near Hazleton, during a university lecture. There are two Neolithic long barrows at Hazleton, one of which was excavated over three summer seasons between 1980 and 1982.

== Turkdean Roman Villa ==
The Channel 4 archaeological television series Time Team made two visits, in 1997 (Time Team Live 1997, repackaged as series 5 episode 4) and 1998 (series 6 episode 9), to excavate a Roman villa site about 1 mile to the north of the village.

In 2012, Turkdean Roman Villa was listed as a Scheduled Monument by Historic England.

== Twrch Trwyth ==
As previously noted, the term twrch in Welsh denotes "wild boar, hog, mole". So Twrch Trwyth means "the boar Trwyth". Its Irish cognate may be Triath, King of the Swine (Old Irish: Triath ri torcraide) or the Torc Triath mentioned in Lebor Gabála Érenn, also recorded as Old Irish Orc tréith "Triath's boar" in Sanas Cormaic. Rachel Bromwich regards the form Trwyth as a late corruption. In the early text Historia Brittonum, the boar is called Troynt or Troit, a Latinisation likely from the Welsh Trwyd. Further evidence that Trwyd was the correct form appears in a reference in a later poem.

The names of the hound and boar Twrch Trwyth are glimpsed in a piece of geographical onomasticon composed in Latin in the 9th century, the Historia Brittonum. Twrch Trwyth (Welsh pronunciation: [tuːɾχ tɾʊɨθ]; also Latin: Troynt (MSS.HK); Troit (MSS.C^{1} D G Q); or Terit (MSS. C^{2} L)) is an enchanted wild boar in the Matter of Britain that King Arthur or his men pursued with the aid of Arthur's dog Cavall (Welsh: Cafall, Latin: Cabal).

== Notable residents ==
The 300-year-old manor house in the village is the primary residence of musician Steve Winwood, where he also has a recording studio.

== Selected bibliography ==
- Celtic Folklore Welsh And Manx by John Rhys [1901]
- Mommsen, Theodore, ed. (1898), "Historia Brittonvm cvm additamentis Nennii" (Internet Archive), Chronica Minora, Monumenta Germaniae Historica, Auctorum Antiquissimi xiii, vol. 3, Berlin, pp. 111–222
