= Save That Shit =

2017 Single by Lil Peep

Single by Lil Peep

from the album Come Over When You're Sober, Pt. 1
- Released: August 12, 2017
- Recorded: 2017
- Genre: Emo rap; rap rock; alternative rock
- Length: 3:52
- Label: First Access
- Songwriters: Gustav Elijah Åhr; George Astasio; Jason Pebworth; Jon Shave; Michael Blackburn; Juan Alderete de la Peña
- Producers: Smokeasac; IIVI

Lil Peep singles chronology
"Awful Things" (2017)	"Save That Shit" (2017)	"Nightslayer" (2017)

Music video
- "Save That Shit" on YouTube

"Save That Shit" is a song by American rapper Lil Peep from his first studio album, Come Over When You're Sober, Pt. 1 (2017). It was released as the fourth single from the album on August 12, 2017. The track was produced by Smokeasac and IIVI, and written by the artist himself, George Astasio, Jason Pebworth, Jon Shave, Michael Blackburn and Juan Alderete de la Peña. The song is Lil Peep's sixth highest-charting single in the United States, peaking at number nine on the Billboard Bubbling Under R&B/Hip-Hop Singles chart following his death on November 15, 2017.

== Critical reception ==
Mitch Findlay of HotNewHipHop gave the song a positive review, recommending readers to check the song out."

== Chart performance ==
In the United States, following Lil Peep's death, "Save That Shit" debuted at number nine on the Billboard Bubbling Under R&B/Hip-Hop Singles chart in the week beginning December 9, 2017, becoming Lil Peep's second highest-charting song in the country. The song later fell off the chart, in the following week.

In Canada, the song debuted at number 97 on the Canadian Hot 100 alongside "Awful Things", in the week beginning December 9, 2017, where it became Lil Peep's second highest-charting song in the country. It later dropped off the chart the following week beginning on December 16, 2017.

== Music video ==
The music video for "Save That Shit" premiered posthumously on December 19, 2017. It was directed by Mezzy and Heavy Rayn.

== Charts ==
Chart (2017)	Peak position
Canada Hot 100 (Billboard)	97
Latvia (DigiTop100)	23
Sweden (Sverigetopplistan)	75
US Bubbling Under R&B/Hip-Hop Singles	9

== Certifications ==
Region	Certification	Certified units/sales
Australia (ARIA)	3× Platinum	210,000^{‡}
Denmark (IFPI Danmark)	Gold	45,000^{‡}
France (SNEP)	Gold	100,000^{‡}
Italy (FIMI)	Gold	35,000^{‡}
New Zealand (RMNZ)	2× Platinum	60,000^{‡}
Spain (Promusicae)	Gold	30,000^{‡}
United Kingdom (BPI)	Platinum	600,000^{‡}
United States (RIAA)	4× Platinum	4,000,000^{‡}
Streaming
Sweden (GLF)	Gold	4,000,000^{†}
^{‡} Sales+streaming figures based on certification alone.^{†} Streaming-only figures based on certification alone.
