= Come Over When You're Sober, Pt. 1 =

Studio album by Lil Peep
- Released: August 15, 2017
- Recorded: 2017
- Genre: Emo rap; pop punk; rap rock; trap
- Length: 23:30
- Label: AUTNMY; AWAL
- Producer: Smokeasac; IIVI

Lil Peep chronology
Castles II (2017)	Come Over When You're Sober, Pt. 1 (2017)	Come Over When You're Sober, Pt. 2 (2018)

Singles from Come Over When You're Sober, Pt. 1
- 1. "Benz Truck (гелик)" Released: June 9, 2017; 2. "The Brightside" Released: July 27, 2017; 3. "Awful Things" Released: July 28, 2017; 4. "Save That Shit" Released: August 12, 2017

Professional ratings
Review scores
Source	Rating
Pitchfork	(7.3/10)

Come Over When You're Sober, Pt. 1 (often shortened to COWYS Pt. 1), is the debut studio album by American rapper Lil Peep and the only album to be released during his lifetime. It was released on August 15, 2017, by AUTNMY via AWAL. The album was supported by four singles: "Benz Truck (гелик)", "The Brightside", "Awful Things" and "Save That Shit". Lil Peep died exactly three months after the album's release.

Following Lil Peep's death, Come Over When You're Sober, Pt. 1 peaked at number 38 on the US Billboard 200.

== Background ==
In 2017, Lil Peep left Los Angeles, California. He considered moving to his home-town of Long Beach, New York but instead opted for London, England, using his Swedish citizenship and passport to stay. In London, Peep's management, First Access Entertainment, who he had been signed with since August 2016 set the artist up with a home and studio.

== Recording ==
This album marked Peep's first studio recording session and his first collaboration outside of his immediate circle. He began working with Rob Cavallo and eventually, Astasio, a member of the Invisible Men songwriting and production trio. Peep used to record on his microphone at home as well as at the studio, the $800 microphone being bought with his own money.

== Commercial performance ==
Following the release of Come Over When You're Sober, Pt. 1, the album debuted in only one country, the Czech Republic on August 22, 2017. Following Lil Peep's death, Come Over When You're Sober, Pt. 1 entered the Billboard 200 at #168 and sold 16,000 album-equivalent units the following week, peaking at #38.

== Sequel album ==
Following Lil Peep's death, his producer Smokeasac revealed that Peep had made several unreleased songs, ones specifically made for a possible sequel to this album entitled Come Over When You're Sober, Pt. 2. In a tweet shortly after Peep's death, Smokeasac tweeted that he and Peep made "beautiful music" during 2017 and that he still has unreleased music from him.

In February 2018, Smokeasac tweeted a confirmation that the album was coming, but would be released when the "time is right".

Not long before Lil Peep's promotional tour for the album was to end, he announced on Twitter that he would be releasing an EP entitled Goth Angel Sinner, consisting of three songs produced by Fish Narc. Columbia Records later acquired Peep's unreleased material, including the EP, although the demo version of the EP was leaked in October 2018. The EP released for streaming in October 2019.

== Track listing ==
Songwriting credits taken from BMI, production credits from Lil Peep's official SoundCloud account.

Come Over When You're Sober, Pt. 1
No.	Title	Writer(s)	Producer(s)	Length
1.	"Benz Truck (гелик)"	Gustav Åhr; Dylan Mullen; George Astasio; Jason Pebworth; Jon Shave; Robert Cavallo; Juan Alderete de la Peña	Smokeasac	2:40
2.	"Save That Shit"	Åhr; Mullen; Astasio; Pebworth; Shave; Michael Blackburn	Smokeasac; IIVI	3:52
3.	"Awful Things" (featuring Lil Tracy)	Åhr; Jazz Butler; Mullen; Astasio; Pebworth; Shave; Blackburn	Smokeasac; IIVI	3:34
4.	"U Said"	Åhr; Astasio; Pebworth; Shave; Mullen	Smokeasac; IIVI	3:44
5.	"Better Off (Dying)"	Åhr; Mullen; Astasio; Pebworth; Shave; Blackburn	Smokeasac; IIVI	2:35
6.	"The Brightside"	Åhr; Mullen; Astasio; Pebworth; Shave; Blackburn	Smokeasac	3:36
7.	"Problems"	Åhr; Mullen; Astasio; Pebworth; Shave	Smokeasac; IIVI	3:29
Total length:				23:30

== Charts ==
=== Weekly charts ===
Chart (2017)	Peak position
Austrian Albums (Ö3 Austria)	54
Belgian Albums (Ultratop Flanders)	93
Belgian Albums (Ultratop Wallonia)	176
Canadian Albums (Billboard)	34
Czech Albums (ČNS IFPI)	56
Danish Albums (Hitlisten)	32
Dutch Albums (Album Top 100)	58
Finnish Albums (Suomen virallinen lista)	13
French Albums (SNEP)	112
German Albums (Offizielle Top 100)	82
Italian Albums (FIMI)	100
Latvian Albums (LaIPA)	1
New Zealand Albums (RMNZ)	19
Norwegian Albums (VG-lista)	10
Swedish Albums (Sverigetopplistan)	11
UK Albums (OCC)	71
US Billboard 200	38
US Independent Albums (Billboard)	23
US Top R&B/Hip-Hop Albums (Billboard)	16

=== Year-end charts ===
Chart (2018)	Position
Estonian Albums (IFPI)	5
Swedish Albums (Sverigetopplistan)	33

== Certifications ==
Region	Certification	Certified units/sales
Denmark (IFPI Danmark)	Gold	10,000^{‡}
New Zealand (RMNZ)	Platinum	15,000^{‡}
United Kingdom (BPI)	Gold	100,000^{‡}
United States (RIAA)	Platinum	1,000,000^{‡}
^{‡} Sales+streaming figures based on certification alone.
