= Fuck the Pain Away =

2000 song by Peaches

Song by Peaches

from the album The Teaches of Peaches
- Released: September 5, 2000
- Recorded: The Rivoli, Toronto, Ontario, July 19, 1999
- Genre: Electroclash: synth-pop; techno
- Length: 4:08
- Label: Kitty-Yo; XL
- Songwriter: Peaches
- Producer: Peaches

"Fuck the Pain Away" is a song by Canadian singer Peaches from her second studio album, The Teaches of Peaches (2000). It became her breakthrough song and has since remained her signature song. Its widespread licensing in films as well as numerous official and unofficial cover versions has led to a sustained popularity for the song.

== Writing and inspiration ==
"Fuck the Pain Away"
The song features "big blurts of bass and stiff drums".

The song combines low-fidelity, rumbling bass with snare drums from a Roland TR-909 to make a "clickity-clack" rhythm. Muted yelling sounds can be heard in the background.

The song's lyrics established Peaches' reputation as a sex-positive feminist. She uses euphemisms to present a sexually aggressive image. The lyrics include references to "Call Me" by Blondie and The Pretenders' frontwoman Chrissie Hynde. The line "Stay in school, 'cause it's the best" alludes to Peaches' previous occupation as a teacher. Peaches' vocal performance was described as vampy, lustful, and insouciant. Her bold delivery holds "between self-empowerment and self-destruction."

== Recording ==
Peaches never recorded "Fuck the Pain Away" in a studio. The only official version is a live recording from the first time it was ever performed at The Rivoli in Toronto. Peaches has noted the presence of tape hiss and crowd noise on the master, which was taken from a cassette recording of the board mix that was offered to her by the sound engineer after the performance in exchange for $5. Nevertheless, she has stated that "it ain't broke, don't fix [it]. I am never recording this song again."

== Critical reception ==
The Observer Music Monthly listed "Fuck the Pain Away" at 61 on its list of the best songs of the 2000s. Complex magazine named it the seventh greatest slutwave song of all time. Q listed it at #826 on their 1001 Best Songs Ever list. The Guardian included the song on its list of "1000 songs everyone must hear". Rolling Stone included the song on their 2019 list of "25 Essential LGBTQ Pride Songs," noting how the song "sparked a titillating new wave of sleazebag disco".

== Music videos ==
Notably, there is no official music video for the song, and Peaches called upon fans to create videos and other performance art pieces which utilize it. One parody shows "Fuck the Pain Away" being performed by Miss Piggy. Another version, directed by Erik Huber, takes footage from The Andy Griffith Show and inserts a dancing woman.

== Impact and reuse ==
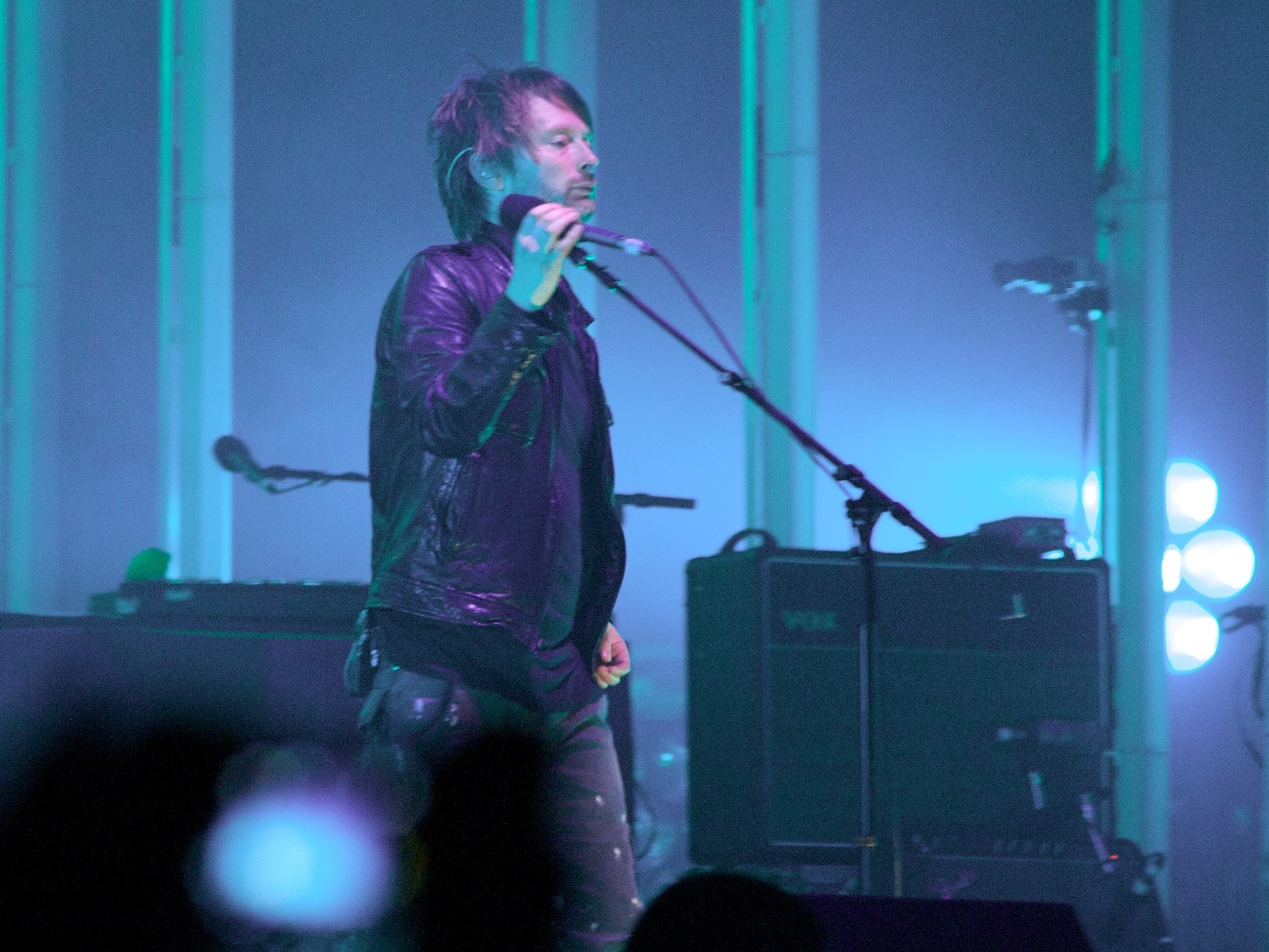
Thom Yorke performing "15 Step", which was indirectly influenced by "Fuck the Pain Away".

Thom Yorke cited "Fuck the Pain Away" as an indirect inspiration when making "15 Step" for Radiohead's 2007 album In Rainbows. A nightclub in Brighton, England, is named after "Fuck the Pain Away".

Belgian group 2ManyDJs included the song on their 2002 album As Heard on Radio Soulwax Pt. 2. It appears on the album's visual mix, accompanied by clips of the Velvet Underground's banana design emerging from Peaches' groin from The Teaches of Peaches. British singer Bat for Lashes has performed a live cover version. On Gorgon City's 2014 album Sirens, Erik Hassle reinterprets the refrain for "FTPA", a song about casual sex. In 2020, American rapper Yung Gravy sampled the song in his single "Oops!", included on his album Gasanova.

"Fuck the Pain Away" became a popular choice when film and TV soundtracks were in need of a catchy but objectionable song. It was used for a key scene in Sofia Coppola's 2003 film Lost in Translation. In the scene, Bill Murray's character glumly sits in a Japanese strip club as women pole dance to the song. It is used in the 2002 horror film My Little Eye, the 2006 reality film Jackass Number Two, the 2011 romantic comedy Getting That Girl, the 2011 action film Drive Angry, and the 2013 gross out film Wetlands, as well as being sung by Bollo in The Mighty Boosh Live. It also appeared in an episode of the thirteenth season of South Park, "Butters' Bottom Bitch". The 30 Rock episode "Future Husband" shows Tina Fey's character Liz Lemon using the song as a ringtone. The song also appeared in end credits of the True Blood season 6 episode of the same name. The song was also used in The Handmaid's Tale in a 2017 episode, "Nolite Te Bastardes Carborundorum", and in the Canadian show Letterkenny in a 2018 episode, "We Don't Fight at Weddings". A choral version appeared in season 3 of Sex Education. In British television series This Way Up, the song appears on season 2 episode 3 in a striptease scene.
