= Young Gravy =

Young Gravy may refer to:

- Yung Gravy, American rapper
- Westside Gravy, American rapper formerly known as Young Gravy
