= Sensational (Yung Gravy album) =

Studio album by Yung Gravy
- Released: May 31, 2019
- Studios: Carpet Booth Studios in Rochester, Minnesota
- Genre: Hip-hop
- Length: 32:19
- Label: Republic
- Producers: Jason Rich; Y2K; Yung Gravy; Dollie; Boston; Swvde; downtime; j gramm; Ripto; Big Gator Bossman; Lakin; Tee-Watt; Lakey Inspired; Julian Avila; Popnick; Zach Zurn

Yung Gravy chronology
Snow Cougar EP (2018)	Sensational (2019)	Baby Gravy 2 (2020)

Singles from Sensational
- 1. "Magic" Released: April 4, 2018; 2. "Gravy Train" Released: October 24, 2018; 3. "Pizzazz" Released: November 8, 2018; 4. "Whip a Tesla" Released: August 15, 2019

Sensational is the debut studio album by American rapper Yung Gravy. It was released on May 31, 2019, by Republic Records. The album features appearances from a frequent collaborator bbno$, alongside other artists such as Juicy J, Pouya and Lil Baby, among others.

== Background and release ==
In May of 2019, Yung Gravy would announce his new album titled Sensational would drop on the 31st, as well as launching new merchandise including t-shirts, hats, and vinyl. Sensational released on May 31, 2019 via Republic Records.

== Recording ==
Some of Yung Gravy's vocals were recorded by producer and engineer Zach Zurn at Carpet Booth Studios in Rochester, MN.

== Reception ==
Professional ratings
Review scores
Source	Rating
AllMusic	2.5/5 stars
Rap Reviews	6.5/10

Sensational received mixed to positive reviews. Violet Worzella from The Howler called the album "by far one of the most entertaining rap albums of the year." Saying: "His playful and funny lyrics create a truly interesting album." Ones to Watch gave a positive review saying: "There is a genuine sense of musicality and reverence for the oldies to be found in the uproariously good time that is Sensational." The album reached number 52 on the US Billboard 200 and 30 on the Top R&B/Hip-Hop Albums chart.

== Track listing ==
Sensational track listing
No.	Title	Producer(s)	Length
1.	"Gravy for Pope"	Jason Rich; Popnick	2:56
2.	"Buttered Up" (featuring Juicy J)	Rich; Popnick	2:50
3.	"Charlene" (featuring Mia Gladstone)	Y2K; Boston	2:41
4.	"The Boys Are Back in Town" (featuring Pouya, Ramirez and TrippyThaKid)	Y2K; Swvde; Yung Gravy	2:28
5.	"Magic"	Rich; Popnick	2:58
6.	"Whip a Tesla" (featuring bbno$)	downtime; j gramm	2:34
7.	"Daddy Aioli Interlude"	Rich; Ripto; Popnick	1:25
8.	"Gravy Train"	Rich	2:50
9.	"E.T." (featuring Lil Mayo)	Y2K	1:45
10.	"Alley Oop" (featuring Lil Baby)	Rich; Big Gator Bossman; Lakin; Tee-Watt	2:32
11.	"Richard Simmons"	Rich	2:23
12.	"Pizzazz"	Lakey Inspired; Julian Avila	2:46
13.	"1 Thot 2 Thot Red Thot Blue Thot"	Dollie	2:11
Total length:			32:19

== Charts ==
Sensational chart performance
Chart (2019)	Peak position
US Billboard 200	52
US Top R&B/Hip-Hop Albums (Billboard)	30
