= Syracuse University South Campus =

Coordinates: 43.016368°N 76.119243°W

South Campus is located approximately two miles South of Syracuse University's main campus (North Campus). It is home to around 2,500 students, about 50% of whom are Sophomore students.

Students living on South Campus reside in apartments located across the campus. There are two-person and three-person variants of the apartments that students can choose to live in when selecting housing for the next academic year. Apartments consist of a kitchen, a shared bathroom, a common area, and two or three separate bedrooms depending on the number of people in the apartment. Within the bedrooms, there is a bed, a desk, and a wardrobe, which are the same amenities dorms on North Campus have.

Additionally, there are single-person dorm-style rooms located in Skyhall 1, Skyhall 2, and Skyhall 3, which mimic normal dorm buildings. These buildings have a Resident Advisor on the floor, laundry on the floor, a trash room, and pod-style bathrooms, along with a common area just inside the entrance of the buildings.

== History ==
=== Notable events ===
==== The fire of 1959 ====
The M-7 Air Force barracks at Skytop on South Campus housed 43 airmen at the time of the fire. These temporary barracks were constructed as a result of WWII and the Cold War. The majority of the men had just returned from their Christmas break, and many had recently graduated from high school.

It was a frigid night in Syracuse on the night of the fire. Temperatures were recorded at five degrees Fahrenheit.

According to the Post Standard, there was no fire watch on Skytop. Bed checks were carried out at 11:30 p.m., and the campus was patrolled until 3 a.m. The barracks were heated by steam generated from an underground oil furnace. The fire broke out around 5:30 a.m on January 6, and was fueled by strong winter winds, causing it to spread quickly. Fire Marshal John Dacey blamed the smokestack, which had shifted about two inches overnight due to strong winds. It ignited the paper-backed insulation after coming into contact with it. Seven airmen died, while 16 escaped with non-life-threatening injuries. "Their names were: Billy Marlowe, 29; Michael Gasparri, 19; Edward Duggan, 23; Joseph Stoll, 18; Frederick Browning, 21; Remus Tidwell, 18; and Thomas Merfield, 28."

The Skytop fire is the fourth deadliest in Syracuse history. This was the first time anyone at Syracuse University has succumbed to a fire. According to the Post Standard, classes at the institute continued as planned to divert the men's attention away from the fire and the deaths of their friends. Soon after, calls for change emerged. Following a meeting between Syracuse Mayor Anthony Henninger and Chancellor Tolley, it was decided that Syracuse University would set up automated fire alarms in the temporary buildings and maintain a nightly foot patrol. In addition, Tolley pledged to demolish the buildings by summer. Plans to construct a three-story "fire-resistant" dorm for the Air Force Institute of Technology were put forth in June 1959.

The account of what transpired that evening seemed to fade into obscurity over time. For the men who had died at the time of the event, there was no memorial or ceremony. The first memorial was constructed in October 2013 in memory of those who perished at Skytop.

==== Juice Jam ====
Juice Jam is an annual music festival held in the fall of each academic year hosted at Skytop Field on South Campus. The music festival is put on by University Union, the school's official programming board. They are an entirely student run organization and are responsible for putting on and hosting many entertainment events at Syracuse University. Notable performers at previous Juice Jams are: Yung Gravy, T-Pain, Flo Rida, Denzel Curry, Jack Harlow, and A Boogie wit da Hoodie.

== Facilities ==
=== Recreation facilities ===
Tennity Ice Pavilion: The Tennity Ice Pavilion is an ice-skating and ice hockey facility located on South Campus. It houses the main rink for use by the Syracuse University women's hockey team, as well as a studio rink for public use. The Tennity Ice Pavilion was constructed in 2000 due to a donation from Marilyn and Bill Tennity.

=== Athletics facilities ===
John A. Lalley Athletics Complex: The Lalley Athletics Complex is a new addition to the Manly Field House, which was constructed in the early 1960s, and houses many of the Syracuse Orange's athletics buildings and practice areas.

Challenge Course: Overlooking South Campus from the southwest side is a Challenge Course that provides students and guests with team-building and camaraderie experiences on a ropes course with two levels. Also on the challenge course is a zip-line that rewards participants for completing the course.

Drumlins Country Club: Drumlins Country Club, located adjacent to South Campus' east side, is home to two 18-hole golf courses, a driving range, a golf simulator, Bistro 1926 (a lunch/dinner diner), a swimming pool, and the Drumlins Tennis Club. Syracuse University and SUNY ESF students have access to golf at the West Course for free.

Courts: Within South Campus are 20 tennis courts. They are located near the Tennity Ice Pavilion off of Skytop Road. There are two basketball courts located just north of the tennis courts. All of these courts are available for student use.

Softball Field: On South Campus, there is a single softball field neighboring the Tennity Ice Pavilion to the north.

Skytop Track: On the south-most end of South Campus is the Skytop track. This track is utilized by SU's Air Force and Army ROTCs, sports teams, and is available to the public.

=== Student veteran facilities ===
Syracuse University is home to the Army Reserve Officer Training Corps (ROTC) Stalwart Battalion and Air Force ROTC (AFROTC) Detachment 535. After World War II when the GI Bill was passed, Syracuse University made itself a key player by offering admission to many returning veterans. However, this came with a plethora of issues. Most notably, a lack of housing made it hard to admit so many veterans. To combat this problem, Syracuse University installed new barracks on both North and South campus. On South Campus, they also installed a new 17-building facility on Lambreth Lane as a part of the Air Force Institute of Technology language program. These buildings were the locations of 6-12 month courses in languages like Russian and East Slavic languages.

=== Goldstein Student Center ===
The Ann and Alfred Goldstein Student Center is the main hub of South Campus. It hosts laundry, dining options, a small convenience store, a small gym, volleyball courts, and other recreational spaces for South Campus residents.

== Transportation ==
To access South Campus, students utilize the New York Centro Bus system that stops at the College Place bus stop on North Campus. Bus routes SU344 and SU44 take students to the South Campus apartments and Skytop. The buses run from 7 AM to 8 PM, which are then replaced by Syracuse University trolleys until 2 AM. The South Campus Loop is the only Syracuse Trolley route that brings students to and from South Campus. After the shuttles from South to North campus stop for the evening, the Department of Public Safety (DPS) operates safety shuttles from 8 PM to 6 AM.

Students living on South Campus may also purchase parking passes for the academic year. These passes allow purchasers to park on North Campus, in front of South Campus apartments, and the Skytop lot. Parking passes can be purchased by SU students, SUNY ESF students, and visitors.
