= Crispy Concords =

Parker Stevens, known professionally as Crispy Concords, is an American YouTuber. He began his YouTube career posting Call of Duty: Black Ops II content in 2012. Ever since, his content has become more diverse. Born in Long Island in 1997, he moved to Austin, Texas during his career and has since moved to New York City, during which he released an album which was 4 years in the making. His main channel has 3.99 million subscribers as of Sunday, November 22, 2026. Stevens has collaborated with many notable people, including rapper bbno$.
