= Oops! (Yung Gravy song) =

- Lil Wayne remix cover

Single by Yung Gravy

from the album Gasanova
- Released: January 26, 2021
- Length: 2:19
- Label: Republic
- Songwriters: Matthew Hauri; Valentino Khan; Kenneth Ifill; Sebastian Schallenberg
- Producers: Yung Gravy; Valentino Khan

Yung Gravy singles chronology
"Gas Money" (2020)	"Oops!" (2021)	"Steppin on the Beat" (2021)

Music video
- "Oops!" on YouTube

"Oops!" (stylized in all lowercase) is a song by American rapper Yung Gravy from his second studio album, Gasanova (2020). It was released by Republic Records as the fifth and final single from the album on January 26, 2021.

A remix featuring fellow American rapper Lil Wayne, entitled "oops!!!", was released on March 5, 2021.

== Composition ==
"Oops!" samples Canadian musician Peaches' 2000 song "Fuck the Pain Away". Lyrically, it tells the tale of a promiscuous young man.

== Critical reception ==
Steve 'Flash' Juon of RapReviews said, "Songs like 'oops' also reinforce my feelings about the way casual misogyny drips from his lips like spittle in poor attempts at humor. 'Super duper hoes, y'all got oompa loompa hoes/I ain't never knew your hoes, probably still ran through 'em though.' Dropping a Khia 'My Neck, My Back' reference on the track comes across less like a tribute and more like a white guy co-opting black culture."

== Music video ==
The song's music video was directed by Adriaan Kirchner and was released on February 11, 2021.

== Charts ==
Chart performance for "Oops!"
Chart (2021)	Peak position
US Alternative Airplay (Billboard)	40
US Bubbling Under Hot 100 (Billboard)	23
US Pop Airplay (Billboard)	38

== Certifications ==
Certifications for "Oops!"
Region	Certification	Certified units/sales
New Zealand (RMNZ)	Gold	15,000^{‡}
United States (RIAA)	Gold	500,000^{‡}
^{‡} Sales+streaming figures based on certification alone.

== Release history ==
Region	Date	Format	Label	Ref.
United States	January 26, 2021	Contemporary hit radio	Republic	
