= Gasanova =

Studio album by Yung Gravy
- Released: October 2, 2020
- Studio: Carpet Booth Studios in Rochester, Minnesota
- Genre: Hip hop
- Length: 38:53
- Label: Republic
- Producer: Yung Gravy; Julian Gramma; Cubeatz; Quintin Gulledge; Khirye Tyler; Larrance Dopson; DILIP; Jason Rich; MTK; Valentino Khan; DURO; Popnick; Maiquel V Romero; William Thompson; Matthew Engelwood; Matthew Engels; Zach Zurn; Hal Ritson; Fiasco; Cooper Douglas McGill; Christian Dold; Justin Zim; Garrett Taylor Hartnell; Tobias Wilson; Margaux Lienard; Y2K

Yung Gravy chronology
Baby Gravy 2 (2020)	Gasanova (2020)	Marvelous (2022)

Singles from Gasanova
- 1. "Tampa Bay Bustdown" Released: August 23, 2019; 2. "Jack Money Bean" Released: August 14, 2020; 3. "Yup!" Released: September 2, 2020; 4. "Gas Money" Released: September 18, 2020; 5. "Oops!" Released: January 26, 2021

Gasanova is the second studio album by American rapper Yung Gravy, released on October 2, 2020, by Republic Records. The album features appearances by Ski Mask the Slump God, TrippythaKid, Bobby Raps, Young Dolph, bbno$, Chief Keef, and Y2K.

== Background and promotion ==
Prior to the release of the project, Gravy released two music videos. On April 22, 2020, the video for "Tampa Bay Bustdown" was published, featuring Gravy alongside featured artists Chief Keef and Y2K. On September 2, 2020, Gravy released the video for "Yup!", which tells the story Bruce Buttercrisp, the character Gravy plays in the video.

In collaboration with clothing brand PizzaSlime, a wave of merchandise inspired by Gasanova arrived on September 16, 2020.

Gravy took to Twitter on September 29, 2020, to announce the album, revealing the title, cover art, and track list.

During a virtual press conference on September 30, 2020, Rowdy Magazine asked Gravy to describe Gasanova's "vibe" in three words. He said: "It thumps. It's carefree. It's gas."

The main line of Gasanova merchandise was released alongside the album through Gravy's official webstore titled Creamium.

Following the album's release, Gravy released music videos for the songs "Gas Money" and "Miami Ice".

== Recording ==
Much of Yung Gravy's vocals were recorded by producer and engineer Zach Zurn at Carpet Booth Studios in Rochester, MN.

== Critical reception ==
Professional ratings
Review scores
Source	Rating
AllMusic	3.5/5 stars
RapReviews	6.5/10

Neil Z. Yeung of AllMusic penned the album as "silly and sexual" and called it "typical Gravy". Steve 'Flash' Juon of RapReviews called the album "fine" musically, and "tolerable" lyrically.

== Track listing ==
Gasanova track listing
No.	Title	Producer(s)	Length
1.	"Always Saucy" (with Ski Mask the Slump God and TrippythaKid)	Matthew Hauri; Heinz Kiessling; Zach Zurn	3:12
2.	"Martha Stewart"	Julian Gramma; Kevin Gomringer; Tim Gomringer; Quintin Gulledge; Khirye Tyler; Larrance Dopson; Zach Zurn	3:25
3.	"Bag of Chips" (with Bobby Raps)	Hauri; Zach Zurn	2:34
4.	"Steve Austin" (with Young Dolph)	Dilip Venkatesh; Jason Rich; Matthew Crabtree; Zach Zurn	2:44
5.	"Oops!"	Valentino Khan; Kenneth Ifill; Zach Zurn	2:19
6.	"Yup!"	Nick Seeley; Maiquel V Romero; William Thompson; Zach Zurn	3:09
7.	"Whole Foods" (with bbno$)	Matthew Engelwood; Zach Zurn	2:39
8.	"Gas Money"	Matthew Engels; Crabtree; Zach Zurn	2:46
9.	"Party at My Mama's House"	Ari Starace, Zach Zurn	3:32
10.	"Drip on My Dresser"	Seeley; Rich; Hal Ritson; Richard Adlam; Zach Zurn	2:48
11.	"Miami Ice"	Cooper Douglas McGill; Christian Dold; Justin Zim; Zach Zurn	2:36
12.	"Swimming Lessons"	Seeley; Rich; Zach Zurn	2:44
13.	"Jack Money Bean" (with bbno$)	Garrett Taylor Hartnell	2:33
14.	"Tampa Bay Bustdown" (with Chief Keef and Y2K)	Tobias Wilson; Margaux Lienard; Starace	1:52
Total length:			38:53

Notes

- "Oops!", "Yup!", and "Jack Money Bean" are stylized in lowercase. For example, "Yup!" is stylized as "yup!"

Sample credits

- "Oops!" contains samples from "Fuck the Pain Away", written and performed by Peaches.

== Charts ==
Gasanova chart performance
Chart (2020)	Peak position
US Top Album Sales (Billboard)	52
US Top R&B/Hip-Hop Albums (Billboard)	27
