= Betty (Get Money) =

Single by Yung Gravy

from the album Marvelous
- Released: June 10, 2022
- Length: 2:26
- Label: Republic
- Songwriters: Matthew Hauri; Michael Stock; Matthew Aitken; Peter Waterman
- Producers: Nick Seeley; Dillon Francis; Dwilly; Zach Zurn

Yung Gravy singles chronology
"Hot Tub" (2022)	"Betty (Get Money)" (2022)	"C'est la Vie" (2022)

Music video
- "Betty (Get Money)" on YouTube

"Betty (Get Money)", also referred to as just "Betty", is a song by American rapper Yung Gravy, released through Republic Records on June 10, 2022, as the lead single from his third studio album, Marvelous. It was written by Yung Gravy and produced by Nick Seeley, Dillon Francis and Dwilly, along with the credit for its prominent interpolation of Rick Astley's "Never Gonna Give You Up". The song and its music video, featuring Yung Gravy dancing in a white fur coat, went viral on TikTok shortly after its release, being used in over 300,000 videos.

== Background ==
The song interpolates the synthesizer, chorus and melody of the 1987 song "Never Gonna Give You Up" by English singer Rick Astley; as a result, Mike Stock, Matthew Aitken, and Pete Waterman, the writers of the song, are credited as songwriters. Music publishing company Primary Wave owned a percentage of the rights to the song, and Justin Shukat, the president of the company, pitched the idea of interpolating it to Yung Gravy's management. A day later, they had received an instrumental and within two days Gravy had rapped over the beat. Originally, the record was called 'Get Pussy' with the publishing company requesting a redo of the title and some of the lyrics.

"Betty (Get Money)" is the second song by Gravy to receive viral attention on TikTok, with his 2020 track "Oops!" also seeing some success on the application. Of the over 100,000 videos made since its June 2022 release, many include the bridge "Damn Gravy you so vicious, you so clean, so delicious / How come you ain't got no missus?"

== Lawsuit ==
Although Gravy had obtained a license for the music and lyrics to "Never Gonna Give You Up", he had not been able to obtain a license for the original recording, and had not obtained permission from Astley to copy his voice.

On January 26, 2023, Astley filed a lawsuit in a Los Angeles court, objecting to Gravy's use of an impersonator. The lawsuit cited the 1998 case Midler v. Ford Motor Co., where an impersonator was hired to copy a celebrity; Astley was represented by Richard S. Busch who also handled the Pharrell Williams v. Bridgeport Music case regarding the sampling of Marvin Gaye on "Blurred Lines".

The case was settled in September 2023, with no details of the settlement divulged.

== Music video ==
The music video, released alongside the song on June 10, 2022, also saw viral attention. It includes "fake backdrops, turtlenecks, and a groovy two-step".

== Recording ==
Yung Gravy's vocals were recorded by producer and engineer Zach Zurn at Carpet Booth Studios in Rochester, MN.

== Commercial performance ==
"Betty (Get Money)" is Yung Gravy's first entry on the US Billboard Hot 100, debuting at number 68 in July 2022.

== Charts ==
=== Weekly charts ===
Weekly chart performance for "Betty (Get Money)"
Chart (2022)	Peak position
Australia (ARIA)	25
Canada (Canadian Hot 100)	36
Global 200 (Billboard)	81
Iceland (Tónlistinn)	37
Ireland (IRMA)	50
Lithuania (AGATA)	81
New Zealand (Recorded Music NZ)	23
UK Singles (Official Charts)	73
US Billboard Hot 100	30
US Pop Airplay (Billboard)	12
US Rhythmic (Billboard)	12

=== Year-end charts ===
2022 year-end chart performance for "Betty (Get Money)"
Chart (2022)	Position
Canada (Canadian Hot 100)	99
US Mainstream Top 40 (Billboard)	48

== Certifications ==
Certifications for "Betty (Get Money)"
Region	Certification	Certified units/sales
Australia (ARIA)	3× Platinum	210,000^{‡}
Brazil (Pro-Música Brasil)	Gold	20,000^{‡}
Canada (Music Canada)	Platinum	80,000^{‡}
New Zealand (RMNZ)	Platinum	30,000^{‡}
United States (RIAA)	Platinum	1,000,000^{‡}
^{‡} Sales+streaming figures based on certification alone.
