= Fat Nick =

American rapper (born 1994)

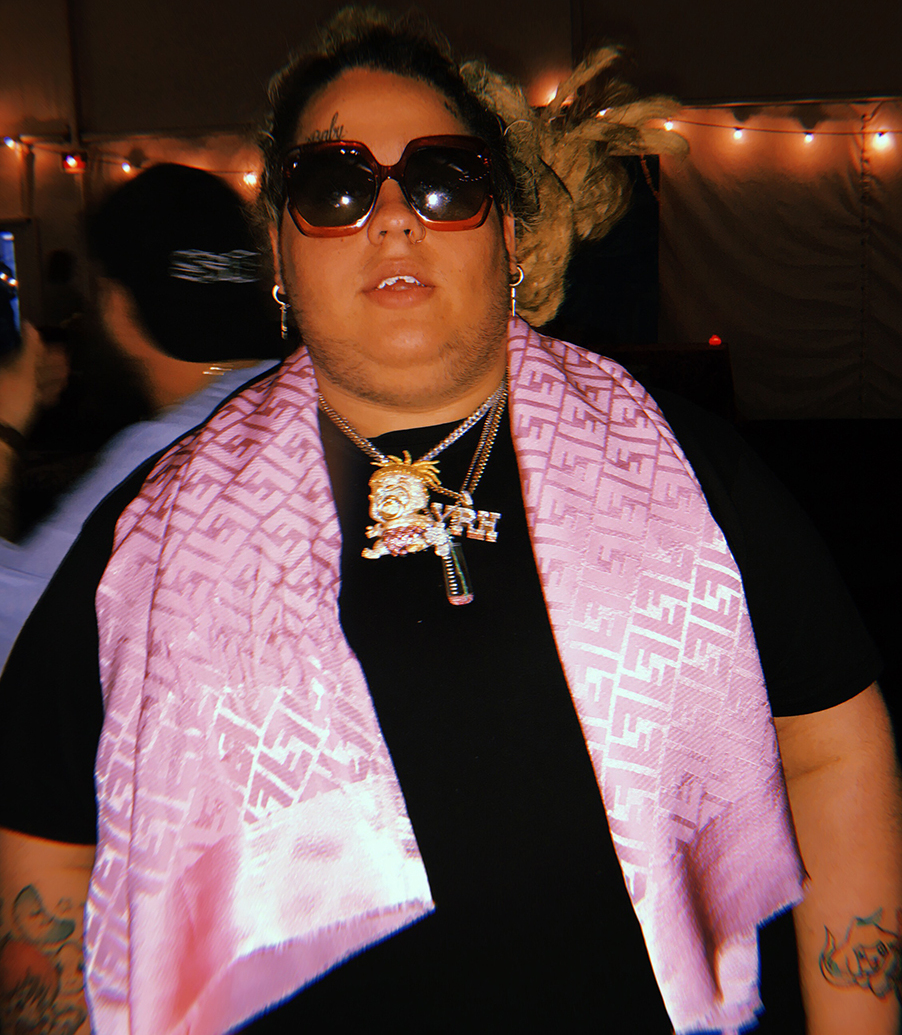
- Fat Nick in April 2018

Background information
- Also known as: Nicky Gordo; Mr. Young Rich & Handsome
- Born: Nicholas Voutsinas; September 6, 1994 (age 32); Miami, Florida, U.S.
- Genres: Hip hop; trap; SoundCloud rap; pop punk
- Occupations: Rapper; songwriter
- Years active: 2012–present
- Label: All But 6

Nicholas Voutsinas (born September 6, 1994), known professionally as Fat Nick, is an American rapper from Miami, Florida. Initially rising to prominence alongside American rapper Pouya and their collective Buffet Boys, he is known for being a leading and important figure of the SoundCloud underground rap scene that began in 2012.

== Career ==
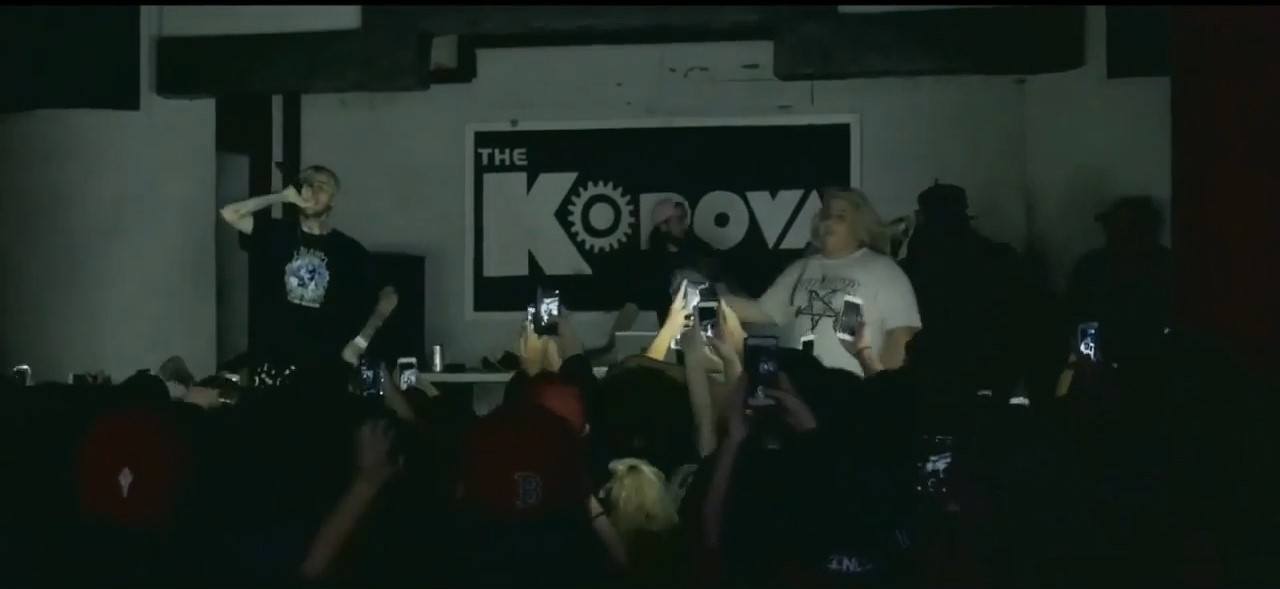
Fat Nick (right) performing with Lil Peep in San Antonio, November 30, 2016

In February 2017, he released a collaborative album with frequent collaborator Pouya titled Drop Out Of School. In July 2017, he performed at a launch party for the documentary Next Wave alongside Lil Tracy and special guests Lil Peep and Joey Purp. In June 2018, he released his album Generation Numb, featuring guest appearances from Blackbear, OhGeesy and Bexey. In December 2020, Fat Nick released his second collaborative album with Pouya titled Drop Out of School 2, the sequel to their 2017 album. In November 2021, he released his album Gorgeous Glizzy Gordo with appearances from Maxo Kream, Shakewell, SosMula, Robb Banks, Ramirez and Lil Jerry. In August 2023, he made a shift to pop punk, with his album HELLO I'M VULNERABLE.

== Personal life ==
Voutsinas has been open about his addiction to opiates since beginning his career in 2012, and started using heavy narcotics in 2013 as a way to battle with anxiety.

=== Controversies ===
==== Drug promotion ====
In September 2018, Voutsinas was accused by American rapper Russ of financially exploiting drug abuse during an interview on The Breakfast Club. Fat Nick responded by apologizing to his fans on Twitter. In October 2018, he was accused by Lil Tracy, a friend and frequent collaborator of the late rapper Lil Peep, of fueling the latter's drug addiction by providing him illicit substances for his 21st birthday.

== Discography ==
=== Studio albums ===
Title	Details
Generation Numb	Released: June 8, 2018; Label: Autnmy Records; Format: Digital download, Streaming
Gorgeous Glizzy Gordo	Released: November 5, 2021; Label: Independent; Formats: Digital download, streaming
Hope You're Proud	Released: October 7, 2022; Label: All But 6; Format: Digital download, Streaming
HELLO I'M VULNERABLE	Released: August 25, 2023; Label: Rostrum Records; Formats: Digital download, streaming

=== Extended plays ===
- Roommates (2019) (w/ Shakewell)
- Drop Out of School 2 (2020) (w/ Pouya)

=== Mixtapes ===
- Buffet Boys (2013)
- Tha Heart Attack (2014)
- Fat Camp (2015)
- When the Lean Runs Out (2016)
- Drop Out of School (2017) (w/ Pouya)
- All But 6 (2023) (w/ All But 6 & Pouya)

=== Singles ===
List of singles, with selected chart positions and certifications, showing year released and album name
Title	Year	Album
"Holy Diabetes"	2013	Non-album singles
"Sacred Cellulite"	2013	Non-album singles
"Filet-O-Guwop"	2014	Non-album singles
"Too Much"	2014	Fat Camp
"Rachel Ray" (featuring Mikey the Magician)	2014	Non-album single
"Foogba"	2015	Fat Camp
"Big Timers" (w/ Eddy Baker)	2015	Non-album singles
"I Gotta" (w/ Pouya)	2015	Non-album singles
"TTYL"	2016	Non-album singles
"K.O."	2016	When the Lean Runs Out
"Nina" (w/ Pouya)	2016	Non-album singles
"Over It"	2016	Non-album singles
"Middle of the Mall" (w/ Pouya)	2016	Drop Out of School
"Torch" (w/ Pouya)	2017	Drop Out of School
"PSA" (w/ Mikey the Magician)	2017	Non-album singles
"Sea Sick" (featuring Ghostemane)	2017	Non-album singles
"Renewed" (w/ Mikey the Magician)	2017	Non-album singles
"Hate on Me" (w/ Pouya)	2017	Non-album singles
"She Want Clout" (w/ Mikey the Magician)	2018	Non-album singles
"Pemex" (w/ Shakewell)	2019	Roommates
"Boofpack" (w/ Shakewell)	2019	Roommates
"New Opps"	2019	Non-album singles
"Pocketrocket" (featuring Famous Dex)	2019	Non-album singles
"Viernes 13" (w/ Kaktov, Dillom & Omar Varela)	2019	Non-album singles
"Opp Block Spinners" (w/ ABG Neal)	2019	Non-album singles
"Miami Party" (w/ IAmChino)	2020	Non-album singles
"Fila" (w/ Big Soto & Happy Colors)	2020	Non-album singles
"Static" (w/ Pouya)	2020	Drop Out of School 2
"Risk Taker"	2021	Gorgeous Glizzy Gordo
"Strap in the Club"	2021	Non-album single
"Still Outside"	2021	Gorgeous Glizzy Gordo
"Park It" (w/ Lil Jerry)	2021	Gorgeous Glizzy Gordo
"Seven Figure Habits" (w/ Pouya)	2022	Non-album single
"On The Weekends I Feel Like Drake"	2022	Hope You're Proud
"Mom... It's Not a Phase" (w/ Kxllswxtch)	2022	Hope You're Proud
"I'm Close Behind" (w/ Mikey the Magician)	2022	Hope You're Proud
"Elevate" (w/ All But 6 & Lu)	2022	All But 6
"7th Grade" (w/ South Strip)	2022	Non-album single
"Songs on the Radio"	2023	Hello I'm Vulnerable
"Wishful Thinking" (w/ Kxllswxtch)	2023	Hello I'm Vulnerable
"Love Bumps" (w/ Pouya)	2023	Hello I'm Vulnerable
"Home Sick"	2023	Hello I'm Vulnerable
