= Crave (Megan Stalter album) =

2026 studio album by Megan Stalter

Studio album by Megan Stalter
- Released: September 18, 2026
- Length: 43:09
- Label: Self-released
- Producers: Matias Mora; Jesse Thomas; Meg Stalter

Singles from Crave
- 1. "Prettiest Girl in America" Released: May 1, 2026; 2. "Gay" Released: June 2, 2026; 3. "Brr" Released: June 12, 2026; 4. "I Need You" Released: July 17, 2026; 5. "Little Black Dress" Released: August 21, 2026

Crave (stylised in all caps) is the debut studio album by American comedian, actress and singer Megan Stalter, released on September 18, 2026. The electropop song "Prettiest Girl in America" is the lead single. Stalter performed the song at the Las Culturistas Culture Awards. The second single is a dance-pop song called "Gay".

== Track listing ==
All tracks written by Meg Stalter, Matias Mora, and Jesse Thomas, except where noted. All tracks produced by Mora and Thomas, except where noted.

Crave track listing
No.	Title	Writer(s)	Producer(s)	Length
1.	"Hi It's Meg (Intro)"	Meg Stalter; Matias Mora	Mora	1:30
2.	"Prettiest Girl in America"			2:44
3.	"Little Black Dress"			2:47
4.	"Gimme Gimme"			2:38
5.	"Ish"			2:27
6.	"Crave"			2:22
7.	"Leave a Message at the… Interlude"	Stalter	Stalter	2:27
8.	"Famous Me"			3:20
9.	"You're Cute"			2:58
10.	"I Didn't Ask"			2:37
11.	"Brr"	Stalter; Mora; Thomas; Kate Morgan		2:23
12.	"Gay"			2:59
13.	"I Need You"			3:38
14.	"Prettiest Girl in America" (VNLLA remix)	Stalter; Mora; Thomas; Vanilla Mace		2:57
15.	"Gay" (Muna remix)	Stalter; Mora; Thomas; Josette Maskin; Katie Gavin; Naomi McPherson		2:59
16.	"Brr" (Cailin Russo remix)	Stalter; Mora; Thomas; Morgan; Russo		2:23
Total length:				43:09

Credits adapted from Tidal.
