= Megan Stalter =

American comedian (born 1990)

- Born: September 15, 1990 (age 36); Cleveland, Ohio, U.S.
- Education: Wright State University
- Occupations: Comedian, actress, singer

Comedy career
- Years active: 2018–present
- Medium: Television; internet
- Genre: Character comedy

Megan Marie Stalter (born September 15, 1990) is an American comedian, actress and singer. Stalter is known for her role as Kayla in the HBO Max comedy Hacks, for which she was nominated for a Primetime Emmy Award, and for starring as Jessica Salmon in the romantic comedy series Too Much. In 2026, under the name Meg Stalter, she released her debut single "Prettiest Girl In America" and announced her debut album Crave.

== Early life ==
Megan Marie Stalter was born on September 15, 1990, in Cleveland, Ohio, where she lived until the age of 12. She then moved around with her family, and lived in Dayton, Huber Heights and Centerville, Ohio. She was raised in the Pentecostal Church. Stalter attended Wayne High School, where she was part of the drama club, and tried out for every play, but never got the lead. After graduating from high school, Stalter attended Sinclair Community College and later Wright State University, but left to try acting again. She began doing sketch and improvisational comedy in Dayton and moved to Chicago soon after to do comedy full time. Stalter often collaborates with her brother Nick.

== Career ==
She started doing improv in her early 20s in Ohio. "I was really, really bad. There was a man at the theater in Ohio who asked me to stop being in the show," says Stalter, "Ohio was pretty right." After a year, she moved to Chicago where she started to find her way in comedy. She also started posting videos online in 2018, on what would become The Megan Stalter Show. In 2019, Stalter moved to New York and got a manager. She quickly made a name for herself in the "alt-comedy scene", often performing more than three nights a week around Brooklyn. New York magazine named Stalter one of the "comedians you should and will know in 2019," and in 2020 The New York Times critic Jason Zinoman declared her "sketch comedy's newest star," writing, "In the constantly shifting ecosystem of young performers on Twitter and Instagram, the most vital voice to emerge during this anxious, isolating moment is that of Meg Stalter." During the pandemic, she improvised as different characters on nightly shows on Instagram Live, which raised her profile rapidly. The Los Angeles Times compared Stalter to other self-distributed comedians such as Cole Escola and Ziwe.

On Social Media, a skit of Stalter went viral parodying rainbow capitalism with brands during Pride Month, with the opening line "Hi Gay!" becoming a popular meme.

In 2019, she joined the cast and writing staff of the reboot of The National Lampoon Radio Hour. She also hosted the webseries The Megan Stalter Show and the Forever Dog podcast Confronting Demons with Megan Stalter. She is the voice of Bonnie Davis in the Paramount+ original series Tooning Out the News and played Kayla in the HBO Max comedy Hacks. The Los Angeles Times called the latter role, as a "clueless Hollywood assistant brimming with self-assurance yet utterly lacking self-awareness," her breakout role. In 2023, she joined the cast of the film The Treasure of Foggy Mountain, playing park ranger Lisa, alongside X Mayo.

In July 2025, Stalter starred in Too Much, a comedy series created by Lena Dunham and released on Netflix.

In May 2026, Stalter released her debut single "Prettiest Girl In America" and announced her debut album Crave.

On June 2, 2026, Stalter released the second single from her debut album Crave, titled "Gay". On June 12, Stalter released another single, titled "Brr".

In July 2026, Stalter made her Broadway debut, taking over the role of Mary Todd Lincoln in Oh, Mary! for a ten-week engagement.

== Personal life ==
Stalter is a practicing Christian. She is bisexual.

At the 2025 Emmy Awards, Stalter wore a bag with "ceasefire" written on it, calling for an end to the Gaza war. Following the killing of Alex Pretti in January 2026, Stalter stated that she supported abolishing ICE and that it was "what Jesus would do".

Her favorite pastime is painting.

== Filmography ==
=== Film ===
Year	Title	Role	Notes
2020	Little Miss Ohio	Various characters	
2021	Star-Crossed: The Film	Heist Gear Driver	
2023	Sometimes I Think About Dying	Isobel	
2023	Cora Bora	Cora	Also executive producer
2023	Problemista	Lili	
2023	First Time Female Director	Davina	
2023	Please Don't Destroy: The Treasure of Foggy Mountain	Lisa	
2024	A Nonsense Christmas with Sabrina Carpenter	Sabrina's friend	

=== Television ===
Year	Title	Role	Notes
2020–2021	Tooning Out the News	Bonnie Davis (voice)	31 episodes
2021	Crank Yankers	Female Jet Skier	Episode: "Brian Posehn, Kevin Nealon, Quinta Brunson"
2021	Yearly Departed	Self	Comedy special
2021–2026	Hacks	Kayla Schaefer	33 episodes
2022	Snack vs. Chef	Herself (host)	8 episodes
2022	Queer as Folk	Meg	Episode: "Problemática"
2022	The Great North	Jill (voice)	Episode: "Bee's All That Adventure"
2023	RuPaul's Drag Race	Herself (guest judge)	Episode: "Old Friends Gold"
2025	Number 1 Happy Family USA	Gina (voice)	6 episodes
2025	Too Much	Jessica Salmon	10 episodes
2026	Big City Greens	Wendy Woolery (voice)	

=== Theater ===
Year	Title	Role	Venue	Notes
2026	Oh, Mary!	Mary Todd Lincoln	Lyceum Theatre	Broadway debut

=== Music videos ===
Year	Song title	Artist	Role
2019	"Cheerleader"	Sir Babygirl	Hot Love Interest
2021	"simple times"	Kacey Musgraves	Diva
2022	"What I Want"	Muna	Manager
2025	"TOO MUCH x London Bridge"	Fergie	Self

== Discography ==
=== Studio albums ===
Title	Details
Crave	Released: 2026; Format: Digital download, streaming

=== Singles ===
Year	Song	Album
2026	"Prettiest Girl in America"	Crave
2026	"Prettiest Girl in America" (Vnlla Remix)	Non-album single
2026	"Gay"	Crave
2026	"Brr"	Crave
2026	"Gay" (featuring MUNA) [MUNA Remix]	Non-album singles
2026	"Brr" (Cailin Russo Remix)	Non-album singles
2026	"I Need You"	Crave
2026	"Little Black Dress"	Crave

== Awards and nominations ==
Year	Award	Category	Work	Result	Ref.
2021	Actor Awards	Outstanding Performance by an Ensemble in a Comedy Series	Hacks	Nominated	
2022	Actor Awards	Outstanding Performance by an Ensemble in a Comedy Series	Hacks	Nominated	
2024	Actor Awards	Outstanding Performance by an Ensemble in a Comedy Series	Hacks	Nominated	
2025	Actor Awards	Outstanding Performance by an Ensemble in a Comedy Series	Hacks	Nominated	
2025	Critics Choice Awards Celebration of LGBTQ+ Cinema and Television	Breakthrough Performance – Television	Hacks	Won	
2026	Queerty Awards	Vanguard Award	Herself	Honored	
2026	Primetime Emmy Awards	Outstanding Supporting Actress in a Comedy Series	Hacks	Nominated	
