= Vanillamace =

American Internet personality (born 1996)

- Born: Emily; August 25, 1996 (age 30); Hartford, Connecticut, U.S.
- Occupations: Twitch streamer; YouTuber

TikTok information
- Page: vanilla
- Years active: 2019-present
- Followers: 6 million

Twitch information
- Channel: Vanillamace
- Years active: 2020–present
- Genres: Gaming; Vlog
- Followers: 1.2 million

YouTube information
- Channel: Vanillamace
- Years active: 2024–present
- Genres: Gaming; Vlog
- Subscribers: 2.2 million
- Views: 157 million
- Last updated: Nov 10, 2026

Emily (born August 25, 1996), also known as Vanillamace or simply Vanilla, is an American video game livestreamer, social media personality, singer and YouTuber. She went viral several times in 2025 and was nominated for two awards at the Streamer Awards that same year. She later won three awards at the 2026 Streamer Awards.

== Life and career ==
Emily grew up in Connecticut, where she played video games such as Luigi's Mansion and Guitar Hero as a hobby before doing it seriously after her brother started playing Minecraft. She spent six years working as a dancer in a strip club in Boston, during which time she posted footage of her job and a video of herself leaving her home with bleached eyebrows. In 2024, after finding success as a gamer on Twitch, she left her job to become a full-time content creator under the username Vanillamace.

Vanillamace’s fame skyrocketed in the late months of 2024 after publishing a video of her opening blind boxes from Pop Mart and repeatedly receiving a Skullpanda keychain she described as a "fuck-ass Christmas tree" and saying she did not want it, but ended up getting it. Compilation edits of her reactions also went viral. The video was part of a series of unboxing videos, which along with her livestream reactions, increased her TikTok followers from 300,000 to 3.8 million in three months. She published a Get Ready With Me video providing advice on how to avoid ICE agents, read a note from a fan about body neutrality in June, and unboxed a package from Cincinnati streamer Sydney Smith containing a can of Skyline Chili and Grippo's in July. She also went viral several other times, including once from her reaction to eating a donut.

In September 2025, she signed with United Talent Agency, who reported that her content included vlogs, Get Ready With Me videos, and lifestyle and gaming footage. At the time, her content focused on showcasing LGBT experiences. Vanillamace featured on "Bing Bong" in October, the focus track from Bbno$'s self-titled studio album, Bbno$, and was nominated for two awards at the 2025 Streamer Awards in November. She then performed as part of a December concert within the video game Peak. In April 2026, she was announced as the face of Boy Smells' Vanilla Era perfume. Vanillamace appeared as a guest on Brittany Broski's Royal Court web series in November 2026.

== Discography ==
Title	Year	Peak chart positions	Album
Title	Year	NZ Hot	Album
"Bing Bong" (Bbno$ with VNLLA)	2025	23	Bbno$
"Prettiest Girl In America - Remix" (Meg Stalter with VNLLA)	2026	—N/a	Crave
"Gotta Have It" (Ruzèt featuring VNLLA)	2026	—N/a	—N/a

== Awards and nominations ==
Awards and nominations for Vanillamace
Ceremony	Year	Category	Result	Ref.
The Streamer Awards	2025	Best Breakout Streamer	Nominated	
The Streamer Awards	2025	The Sapphire Award	Nominated	
The Streamer Awards	2026	Best Stream Duo (Note: Shared with Katie B.)	Won	
The Streamer Awards	2026	The Sapphire Award	Won	
The Streamer Awards	2026	President of Chat	Nominated	
The Streamer Awards	2026	Best Dressed Award	Won	
