= Kxllswxtch =

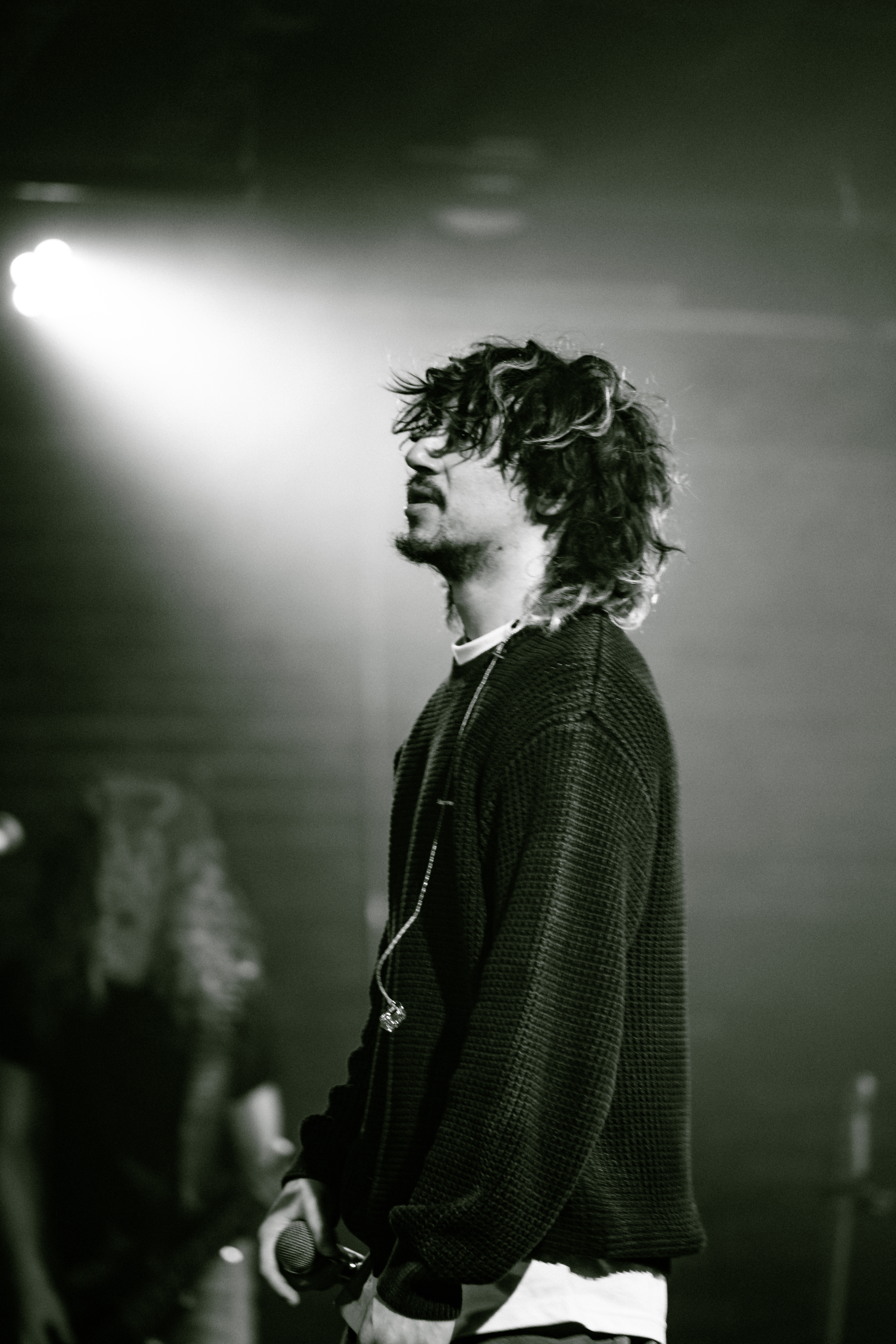
- Kxllswxtch performing in Detroit (2025)

Background information
- Born: Jonathan Robert Whitmer; Before 1997
- Origin: Orange County, California
- Genres: Hip hop; trap; trap metal; lo-fi; emo rap; SoundCloud rap; pop; emo pop; pop-punk
- Occupations: Rapper; singer; songwriter
- Years active: 2017–present
- Label: Empire All But 6
- Website: kxllswxtch.com

Jonathan Robert Whitmer (born before 1997), better known by his stage name Kxllswxtch, is an American rapper and singer-songwriter from Orange County, California.

Whitmer began creating music in 2017, releasing his debut studio album KILL! in 2020. His sophomore album, DISORDER (2021), featured the breakout single "WASTE," which received RIAA Platinum certification on November 20, 2025. Following this success, he released THE WALLS HAVE EYES (2023), BITTERSWEET (2024), and EYESORE (2025).

== Musical style ==
Whitmer's music is described as being a mix of trap, grunge and heavy metal, often incorporating yelling and screamed vocals. He cited Future, Tyler, the Creator and Nirvana as being some of his biggest influences. While initially rooted in aggressive trap metal, Whitmer’s later work shifted toward a melodic alternative grunge sound. This evolution features a greater use of acoustic instrumentation.

== Discography ==
=== Studio Albums ===
- KILL! (2020)
- DISORDER (2021)
- THE WALLS HAVE EYES (2023)
- BITTERSWEET (2024)
- EYESORE (2025)

=== Collabrative Albums ===
- HOT LEAD AND KOLD FEET with YUNG-RARE and KXNG (2020)

=== EPs ===
- WASTE (2022)
- KXLLSWXTCH UNPLUGGED ACOUSTIC SESSION (2023)

=== Singles ===
- "CameToKillShit" (2017)
- "Cigarette Ashes" (2017)
- "No Clout" (2018)
- "Light Walk!" (2018)
- "Flapjack" (2018)
- "Fist Fuck" (2018)
- "Danny Phantom" (2018)
- "Skull Crack" (2019)
- "Russian Roulette" (2019)
- "Anemic" (2019)
- "Gravel" (2019)
- "Deathwish" (2019)
- "Nani?!" (2019)
- "Exorcist" (2020)
- "Decay" (2020)
- "Psycho" (2020)
- "SO WHAT" (2020)
- "DICK4EVERYONE!" (2020)
- "CRYING IN THE CLUB" (2020)
- "Lord of the Flies" with Pouya (2021)
- "BLACK LAGOON" (2021)
- "Disaster" (2021)
- "Burn" with Pouya (2021)
- "LIGHTS OUT" (2021)
- "HAVE YOU SEEN MY MIND?" with Rocci (2021)
- "MUGSHOT" (2022)
- "CHARLOTTE'S WEB" with Mikey the Magician (2022)
- "OH...LOVE?" with Lu (2022)
- "BOMBS AWAY" (2022)
- "JUNK BUNK FREESTYLE" with Lu, Pouya & Terror Reid (2023)
- "Wishful Thinking" with Fat Nick (2023)
- "FALLING DOWN" (2023)
- "SOS" (2024)
- "WORDS KILL" (2024)
- "BLAZIKIN" (2024)
- "UMAGA" (2025)
- "HEADLOCK" (2025)
- "HAHA" (2025)
- "NEGATIVE" (2025)
- "HOW AM I RICH BUT STILL WORTHLESS" (2025)
- "MILITIA" (2026)

== Tours ==
=== Headlining ===
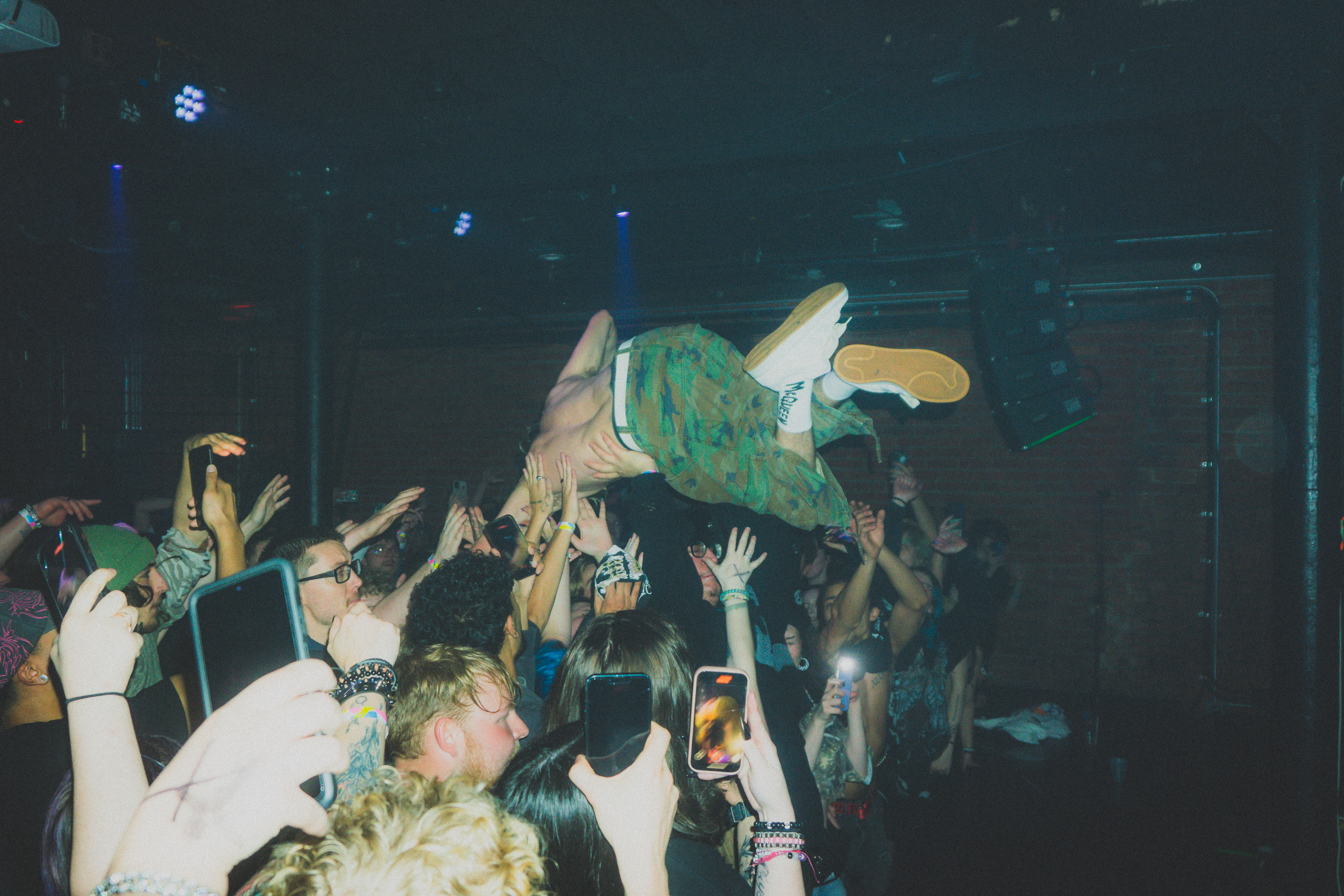
Kxllswxtch jumping into the crowd during the EYESORE TOUR

- KXLLSWXTCH EUROPE TOUR (2023)
- THE WALLS HAVE EYES TOUR (2024)
- HELP ME IN HELL TOUR (2025)
- EYESORE THE TOUR (2026)

=== Supporting ===
- Blood Was Never Thick As Water Tour (supporting Pouya) (2021)
- All But 6 Tour (2023)
- They Could Never Make Me Tour (supporting Pouya) (Europe, 2025)
