= So Loki =

Canadian musical group; hip hop band

So Loki is a Canadian hip hop band from Vancouver, British Columbia, consisting of rapper Sam Lucia and producer Geoffrey Millar. The band is most noted for the singles "Athletes World", whose video was a longlisted Prism Prize nominee in 2019, and "Elephant Man", which was shortlisted for the SOCAN Songwriting Prize in the same year.

The band's first EP, V, was released in 2016, and this was followed up with the full-length album, Shine, in 2017. In 2018, the band released the EP Planet Bando, which included the songs "Athletes World" and "Elephant Man". Later that year, they also released whatever, a split EP with bbno$.
