= Snack vs. Chef =

Television series

- Presented by: Hari Kondabolu; Megan Stalter
- Judges: Helen Park; Ali Bouzari
- Original language: English
- No. of seasons: 1
- No. of episodes: 8

Original release
- Network: Netflix
- Release: November 30, 2022

Snack vs. Chef is a television series on Netflix. The competition series sees contestants recreate snack foods, such as Oreos and Kit-Kats.

== Contestants ==
- Ali Manning, food scientist & home cook
- Sandy Dee Hall, freelance executive chef & culinary consultant
- Francis Legge, executive pastry chef
- Christian Gill, chef & restaurant owner
- Clara Park, freelance chef
- Hari Cameron, former restaurant owner/consultant
- Lauryn Bodden, food editor & developer
- Kris Edelen, private chef
- Kevin Gregory, pastry chef
- Danny Kievit, private chef & business owner
- Luna Contreras, executive chef/bakery owner
- Lauren Jude, mom-prenuer/food scientist

== Episode list ==
No.	Title	Original release date
1	"Flamin' Hot Cheetos"	November 30, 2022
Snack Recreation: Flamin' Hot Cheetos: Winner: Francis; Snack-Off: Chefs were tasked with making a snack that leaves a residue on your fingers.: Ali: Cultu-Rolls - a trio of fruit jelly roll ups; Sandy: What a Pickle - a pickle cheese cracker with dill and white cheddar seasoning; Francis: Scorcheez - fried dough covered in cheesy chipotle powder; Winner: Sandy
2	"Pringles"	November 30, 2022
Snack Recreation: Pringles: Winner: Clara; Snack-Off: Chefs were challenged to create a snack that embodies "edible functionality": Hari: Maxwell's Silver Hammer - sugar army men with a silver sugar hammer to smash them; Christian: Spoon Me - a savory cracker spoon for soup; Clara: Cracklin' Roses - a crisp rice cracker with sesame seeds; Winner: Clara
3	"KitKat"	November 30, 2022
Snack Recreation: Kit-Kats: Winner: Kevin; Snack-Off: Contestants have to create an original shareable snack that came as a single unit but could be broken up into at least four pieces.: Lauryn B: Crackers with Friends - honey sesame and gochujang crackers with letters on them; Kris: Hopgate Bar - a keto-friendly dark chocolate cricket protein bar; Kevin: Lickitysplitz - sweet milk bun with four different flavors inside; Winner: Lauryn B
4	"Oreo"	November 30, 2022
Snack Recreation: Oreos: Winner: Luna; Snack-Off: The chefs had to create an original sandwich snack that could hold its integrity in the packaging.: Lauren J: Phifers - german chocolate cake cookie sandwiches; Luna: Fig Mac - a spiced chocolate cookie with fig filling and cheddar cheese frosting; Danny: Summer Stacker - cheese cracker sandwich with honey pecan jam and summer sausage; Winner: Lauren J; After the preliminary rounds, the judges selected a wildcard to join the other four contestants in the finals. They chose Hari.: Eliminated: Ali, Francis, Christian, Kris, Kevin, Danny, Luna
5	"Gushers"	November 30, 2022
Snack Recreation: Fruit Gushers: Winner: Clara; Snack-Off: Chefs must create an original snack with a surprise inside. The inside must be a different flavor, texture, shape, or color.: Clara: Open Sesames - cookie/cracker balls with a sesame tahini honey pomegranate filling and dipped in chocolate; Lauren J: Peach Cobbler Hand Pie - a mini peach cobbler hand pie with edible peach pit made of sugar cookie and almond paste filling; Hari: Feliz Cakes - corn shaped field cake with an elote filling; Lauren B: Kandy Fried Chicken - a drumstick shaped candy bar with nougat, chewy caramel, and honeycomb halvah and coated in white chocolate; Sandy: Matcha Bomb - a white chocolate sphere with liquid matcha concentrate, oat cream, and a feuilletine wafer ball; Winner: Sandy; Eliminated: Lauren J
6	"Ho Hos"	November 30, 2022
Snack Recreation: Ho Hos: Winner: Lauryn B; Snack-Off: Contestants must create a snack sized version of a classic dessert. Their snack must hit the flavors and textures of their classic dessert but must be portable.: Clara: Apple Pielettes - miniature apple pies with a sugar glaze; Sandy: Banana Bangs - sugar cookie shell topped with dark chocolate, banana buttercream, and a citrus marshmallow; Hari Cosmic Carrot - carrot cake cookie with a marshmallow center and a white chocolate cream cheese icing; Lauryn B: Tiramisu Cakes - mini tiramisu cakes covered in chocolate; Winner: Lauryn B; Eliminated: Hari
7	"Lay's"	November 30, 2022
Snack Recreation: Lay's: Winner: Sandy; Snack-Off: The Final 3 must create a snack that embodies a multiple component dish like chicken and waffles or mushroom risotto. Their snack must incorporate multiple flavor profiles and may be multiple components as long as they are cohesive but it cannot be a chip.: Sandy: Sushi Trail Mix - fried salmon skin, wasabi pea, candied tuna, and puffed rice tossed in a Japanese seven spice; Clara: Brekkie Sandies - a shortbread cookie with bacon bits, maple syrup, cheddar tuile, and covered in cheese powder; Lauryn B: Insta-Ramentic - a ramen noodle bar spiced with shrimp powder and with an umami bang dipping sauce on the side; Winner: Sandy; Eliminated: Clara
8	"The Finale"	November 30, 2022
Snack-Off: Finalists were given four hours to create "The Snack of the Future" - their own completely original snack brand that makes the judges wonder how they ever lived without it.: Lauryn B: Pastables - a fried pasta puff coated in an amatriciana powder; Sandy: Popcorn - a maple carrot ginger popcorn using raw juice pulp; Winner: Lauryn B; Runner-up: Sandy

== See also ==
- List of Netflix original programming
