= Mr. Clean (song) =

2016 single by Yung Gravy

Single by Yung Gravy

from the EP Mr. Clean and Snow Cougar
- Released: September 8, 2016
- Genre: Hip hop; trap
- Length: 3:30
- Songwriter(s): Matthew Hauri; Pat Ballard
- Producer(s): White Shinobi

Yung Gravy singles chronology
"Mr. Clean" (2016)	"Splash Mountain" (2016)

Music video
- "Mr. Clean" on YouTube

"Mr. Clean" is the debut single by American rapper Yung Gravy, released on September 8, 2016 from his debut EP of the same name. It also appears on his EP Snow Cougar (2018). Produced by White Shinobi, the song samples "Mr. Sandman" by The Chordettes. The song gained traction on SoundCloud and further attention following the release of its music video in 2017, becoming Gravy's breakout hit.

== Composition ==
Typical of Yung Gravy's music style, the production infuses a trap beat with a sample of "Mr. Sandman".

== Music video ==
The music video was filmed in Madison, Wisconsin. It sees Yung Gravy wearing a fluffy white bathrobe, washing a car with bikini-clad women and riding a Sea-Doo in Lake Mendota.

== Certifications ==
Certifications for "Mr. Clean"
Region	Certification	Certified units/sales
New Zealand (RMNZ)	Gold	15,000^{‡}
United States (RIAA)	Platinum	1,000,000^{‡}
^{‡} Sales+streaming figures based on certification alone.
