= Bbno$ (album) =

bbno$

Studio album by bbno$
- Released: October 17, 2025
- Recorded: 2024–2025
- Genres: Hip-hop; pop; electronic
- Length: 50:28
- Label: Broke
- Producers: Inverness; Diamond Pistols; Pink Slip; VNLLA; Jeff Ellis; Dale Becker; Dwilly; bbno$; Orion Meshorer; Christian Dold; Sammy Virji; Y2K

Bbno$ chronology
Baby Gravy 3 (2023)	bbno$ (2025)

Singles from bbno$
- 1. "It Boy" Released: May 24, 2024; 2. "Two" Released: October 4, 2024; 3. "Check" Released: February 10, 2025; 4. "Boom" Released: May 1, 2025; 5. "1-800" Released: June 27, 2025; 6. "Hot Topic" Released: September 2, 2025; 7. "NSFW" Released: September 9, 2025; 8. "Yezzir" Released: September 23, 2025; 9. "Gigolo" Released: September 30, 2025; 10. "ADD" Released: October 7, 2025; 11. "Bing Bong" Released: October 17, 2025; 12. "Come to Brazil" Released: February 6, 2026

Professional ratings
Review scores
Source	Rating
AllMusic	3/5 stars

bbno$ is the seventh studio album by Canadian rapper bbno$. It was released on October 17, 2025, and includes various singles released by the rapper, including "It Boy", "Check", "Two", and "1-800" featuring Puerto Rican VTuber Ironmouse. bbno$ is set to embark on various live performances following the release of the album, including The Internet Explorer Tour, beginning in February 2026.

== Background ==
In an interview, bbno$ says there is "no seriousness for this album whatsoever." He goes on to say "there’s so much negativity in the world that when you listen to my music, I want you to separate from reality."

== Track listing ==
Adapted from Spotify.

bbno$ track listing
No.	Title	Writer(s)	Producer(s)	Length
1.	"Bag TF Up"	Alexander Gumuchian; Jesse Saint John	Inverness	2:36
2.	"Bing Bong" (with vnlla)	Gumuchian; Christian Dold; JBach; Kyle Buckley	Diamond Pistols; Pink Slip; VNLLA	2:10
3.	"Gigolo"	Gumuchian; Dold; JBach; Buckley	Diamond Pistols; Pink Slip; Jeff Ellis; Dale Becker	1:58
4.	"Eat Slay Love" (with Käärijä)	Gumuchian; Dold; Saint John; Käärijä	Diamond Pistols	2:02
5.	"It Boy"	Gumuchian; Inverness; Buckley	Inverness; Pink Slip	2:26
6.	"Estrella"	Gumuchian; Dold; JBach; Buckley	Diamond Pistols; Pink Slip	2:18
7.	"Come to Brazil"	Gumuchian; Dold; JBach; Buckley	Diamond Pistols; Pink Slip	2:13
8.	"Check"	Gumuchian; Charles W. Miller; Dan Henig; David Wilson; Gerald Goldstein; Harold Ray Brown; Howard E. Scott; Lee Oskar Levitin; Leroy L. Jordan; Lexxi Saal; Morris Dickerson; Thomas Sylvester Allan	Dwilly	2:02
9.	"Hot Topic"	Gumuchian; Wilson; Demerick Ferm; Saint John; Orion Meshorer	Gumuchian; Dwilly; Meshorer; Dold; Becker	1:55
10.	"Yezzir"	Gumuchian; Charles Roberts Nelson; Buckley; Sammy Virji	Virji; Inverness; Pink Slip; Ellis; Becker	1:46
11.	"Rich Sexy Ugly"	Gumuchian; Dold; JBach; Saint John; Buckley	Diamond Pistols; Pink Slip	2:39
12.	"1-800" (with Ironmouse)	Gumuchian; Saint John; Dold; Ironmouse	Diamond Pistols	3:29
13.	"Pump It"	Gumuchian; Dold; JBach; Buckley	Diamond Pistols; Pink Slip	2:33
14.	"NSFW"	Gumuchian; Dold; Dwilly; Jutes	Diamond Pistols	2:26
15.	"F.U.N.K."	Gumuchian; Dold; Graham Cruser	Diamond Pistols	2:24
16.	"Main Squeeze"	Gumuchian; Dold; JBach; Buckley	Diamond Pistols; Pink Slip	2:03
17.	"ADD"	Gumuchian; Saint John	Inverness; Pink Slip	2:08
18.	"Like This Like That"	Gumuchian; Dold; JBach; Buckley	Diamond Pistols; Pink Slip	2:45
19.	"Two"	Gumuchian; Saint John; Ari Starace	Y2K; Gumuchian	2:15
20.	"Boom"	Gumuchian; Saint John; Starace	Y2K; Gumuchian	2:43
21.	"Finally Up"	Gumuchian; Y2K	Y2K	3:29
Total length:				50:28

Mispress edition bonus track
No.	Title	Length
22.	Untitled	5:32
Total length:		56:00

=== Notes ===
- All tracks except for "NSFW", "F.U.N.K." and "ADD" are stylized in lowercase.
- Track 22 is a hidden track exclusive to the album's vinyl pressings version from bbno$'s online store, featuring a guided meditation after "Finally Up" and 30 seconds of silence.

== Personnel ==
- Jeff Ellis - mixing
- Diamond Pistols - mixing
- Graham Cruser - mixing
- Dale Becker - mastering
- Adam Burt - mastering assistant
- Katie Harvey - mastering assistant
- Noah McCorkle - mastering assistant
- Turner Frilling - graphic design
- Philip Basaric - photography

== Charts ==
Chart performance for bbno$
Chart (2025)	Peak position
Canadian Albums (Billboard)	33
Irish Independent Albums (IRMA)	19
Lithuanian Albums (AGATA)	99
New Zealand Albums (RMNZ)	25
UK Album Downloads (Official Charts)	87
US Billboard 200	140
US Independent Albums (Billboard)	19
US Top Dance Albums (Billboard)	5
