= Edamame (song) =

2021 single by bbno$ featuring Rich Brian

Single by bbno$ featuring Rich Brian

from the album Eat Ya Veggies
- Released: July 23, 2021
- Length: 2:13
- Label: bbno$; 88Rising
- Songwriters: Alexander Gumuchian; Brian Imanuel; Christian Dold
- Producer: Diamond Pistols

bbno$ singles chronology
"Wussup" (2021)	"Edamame" (2021)	"Take a Trip" (2021)

Rich Brian singles chronology
"Time Machine" (2020)	"Edamame" (2021)	"Lazy Susan" (2021)

Music video
- "Edamame" on YouTube

"Edamame" (stylized in all lowercase) is a song by Canadian rapper bbno$ featuring Indonesian rapper Rich Brian for bbno$'s sixth studio album Eat Ya Veggies (2021). It was released on July 23, 2021, as the second single from the album. bbno$ and Rich Brian wrote the song with its producer Diamond Pistols. It also went viral on TikTok, being used in over 10 million videos and watched over two billion times.

The song was a Juno Award nominee for Rap Single of the Year at the Juno Awards of 2022.

== Background ==
On July 14, 2021, bbno$ posted on Twitter that he and Rich Brian had made a song. In an interview with Cool Accidents, bbno$ stated: "I started the song with Diamond Pistols, then I just sent it to him and texted Rich Brian. He immediately replied and was like 'THIS SONG IS FIRE'. He then jumped on it and sent a verse over, came to the studio and we finished it together".

== Critical reception ==
Brodie Harvey of Lyrical Lemonade praised the two artists, writing that "the chemistry is top-notch in the way they effortlessly trade verses back and forth", which "keeps the energy at a high level from beginning to end". Anthony Fantano cited the song as one of his favorite singles of 2021, describing it as "one of the biggest bops of the year".

== Music video ==
An accompanying video, directed by the reggies, was released on July 23, 2021. It features the two artists "clad in medieval armour from the middle ages, puttering around in a lavish Los Angeles home". More specifically, the plated armor used in the video has a historical style between the late Renaissance and Early Modern period.

== Credits and personnel ==
Credits adapted from Tidal.

- Diamond Pistols – producer
- Alex Gumuchian – composer, lyricist
- Brian Imanuel – composer, lyricist
- Christian Dold – composer, lyricist
- Rich Brian – featured artist

== Charts ==
=== Weekly charts ===
Weekly chart performance for "Edamame"
Chart (2021–2022)	Peak position
Australia (ARIA)	23
Canada Hot 100 (Billboard)	13
Canada AC (Billboard)	34
Canada CHR/Top 40 (Billboard)	6
Canada Hot AC (Billboard)	34
Finland (Suomen virallinen lista)	8
Finland (Suomen virallinen lista) JVG and NCO remix	2
Global 200 (Billboard)	165
Ireland (IRMA)	69
Lithuania (AGATA)	86
Mexico Ingles Airplay (Billboard)	1
New Zealand (Recorded Music NZ)	21
Norway (VG-lista)	24
UK Singles (Official Charts)	89
US Bubbling Under Hot 100 (Billboard)	22
US Hot Rock & Alternative Songs (Billboard)	13
US Pop Airplay (Billboard)	23

=== Year-end charts ===
2021 year-end chart performance for "Edamame"
Chart (2021)	Position
US Hot Rock & Alternative Songs (Billboard)	69

2022 year-end chart performance for "Edamame"
Chart (2022)	Position
Canada (Canadian Hot 100)	23

== Certifications ==
Certifications for "Edamame"
Region	Certification	Certified units/sales
Canada (Music Canada)	5× Platinum	400,000^{‡}
Denmark (IFPI Danmark)	Gold	45,000^{‡}
Italy (FIMI)	Gold	50,000^{‡}
New Zealand (RMNZ)	Gold	15,000^{‡}
United Kingdom (BPI)	Gold	400,000^{‡}
United States (RIAA)	Gold	500,000^{‡}
^{‡} Sales+streaming figures based on certification alone.
