= Pouya =

American rapper (born 1994)

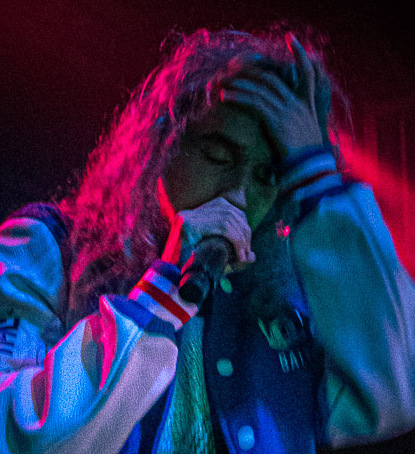
- Pouya performing in 2019

Background information
- Born: Kevin Pouya; December 20, 1994 (age 31); Miami, Florida, U.S.
- Genres: Southern hip hop; cloud rap; alternative hip hop
- Occupations: Rapper; singer; songwriter
- Years active: 2011–present
- Label: All But 6
- Website: pouya305.com

Kevin Pouya (born December 20, 1994), known mononymously as Pouya, is an American rapper. Considered as a pioneer of the underground rap scene that began on SoundCloud in 2012, along with discovering the well known hip-hop duo Suicideboys in their early career, Pouya has developed a long-lasting core fanbase as an independent artist.

== Early life ==
As a teenager, Pouya and his best friend Nicholas Voutsinas (known professionally as "Fat Nick") had a YouTube comedy channel called NICK AND POUYA SHOW. While mostly being comedy sketches, the videos also served as mini vlogs for the friends. Travelling around the local neighborhoods in Miami, they would often feature other friends in the videos, including future rapper Denzel Curry and the group Raider Klan.

Pouya dropped out of high school in his sophomore year. He worked cleaning toilets at a restaurant for a year before finding success in music.

== Career ==
Pouya started rapping seriously around 2011, and after debuting a freestyle with local Florida rapper Nell titled Shotz From The Double Glock, began releasing music frequently. Again staying close with childhood friend Fat Nick, the two formed the Buffet Boys, a group that later became their record label. He gained notoriety after he released the song "Get Buck" in 2013, which as of June 2022 has over 13 million video views. On November 20, 2013, Pouya released a collaboration EP with The Cool Kids' Sir Michael Rocks titled Gookin'. The two connected after Rocks had moved to Miami.

His fifth solo mixtape Stunna, was released on March 5, 2014. Elevator Magazine described the mixtape as Bone Thugs-N-Harmony influenced, and said "he does a great job of molding their style into his own version with a twist of his own style thrown in there." His next mixtape was released on March 25, 2015, entitled South Side Slugs. The mixtape contained guest appearances from Sir Michael Rocks, Denzel Curry, SDotBraddy, Fat Nick, and new Buffet Boys member Germ. Pouya collaborated with Suicideboys on an EP titled $outh $ide $uicide, that was released on September 1, 2015.

In 2016, he released his debut studio album Underground Underdog under the Buffet Boys label. The album peaked at #156 on the Billboard 200. In 2017, he was a featured artist in the song "On Her Mind" by progressive metalcore band Volumes on their album Different Animals. That same year, he released a collaboration mixtape with Fat Nick titled Drop Out of School. In 2018 he released his second studio album, titled Five Five. On June 30, 2019, Pouya released his third studio album titled, The South Got Something to Say. The album included guest appearances from City Morgue, Juicy J and Ghostemane.

In December 2020, Pouya collaborated with Fat Nick to release Drop Out of School 2. Pouya's fourth studio album Blood Was Never Thick As Water was released on October 22, 2021. The title comes from a lyric in the closing song to the album, and features rapper Denzel Curry and singer Lu. In February 2022, he released the extended play dirt/hurt/pain/. It would be the last project by Pouya to be released under Buffet Boys.

In March 2022, Pouya along with other Buffet Boys members, announced that the label would be disbanding indefinitely. Not long after, they announced their new label All But 6 Records.

== Personal life ==
Pouya is of Cuban and Persian heritage, born to a Persian Iranian father and Cuban mother.

== Discography ==
=== Studio albums ===
| Title | Details | Peak chart positions | |
| Title | Details | US 200 | US Ind. |
|---|---|---|---|
| Underground Underdog | Released: April 28, 2016; Label: Buffet Boys; Format: Digital download, Streaming | 156 | 12 |
| Five Five | Released: March 5, 2018; Label: Buffet Boys; Formats: Digital download, streaming | — | 31 |
| The South Got Something to Say | Released: July 1, 2019; Label: Buffet Boys; Format: Digital download, Streaming | — | — |
| Blood Was Never Thick As Water | Released: October 22, 2021; Label: Buffet Boys; Format: Digital download, Streaming, CD, Vinyl | — | — |
| Gator | Released: March 10, 2023; Label: All But 6; Format: Digital download, Streaming | — | — |
| They Could Never Make Me Hate You | Released: August 16, 2024; Label: All But 6; Formats: Digital download, Streaming | — | — |
| Suicidal Thoughts In the Back of the Cadillac, Pt. 3 | Released: February 21, 2025; Label: All But 6; Formats: Digital download, Streaming | — | — |
| Pouya | Released: August 1, 2025; Label: All But 6; Formats: Digital download, Streaming | — | — |
| Foreverglades | Released: May 29, 2026; Label: All But 6; Formats: Digital download, Streaming | — | — |

=== Extended plays ===
- Baby Bone (2013)
- Gookin' (2013) (w/ Sir Michael Rocks)
- $outh $ide $uicide (2015) (w/ $uicideboy$)
- Pouya x Germ x Shakewell EP (2015) (w/ Germ & Shakewell)
- Pouya & Boobie Lootaveli: Greatest Hits, Vol. 1 (2020) (w/ Boobie Lootaveli)
- Drop Out of School 2 (2020) (w/ Fat Nick)
- Dirt/Hurt/Pain (2022)
- Chrome Casketz (2023) (w/ Terror Reid)
- Chrome Casketz 2: Armageddon (2024) (w/ Terror Reid)
- Butter (2026)

=== Mixtapes ===
- Fuck It (2012)
- Don't Sleep On Me Hoe (2012)
- WarBucks (2013) (w/ SDotBraddy)
- Stunna (2014)
- South Side Slugs (2015)
- Drop Out of School (2017) (w/ Fat Nick)
- Pouya & Boobie Lootaveli: Greatest Hits, Vol. 3 (2019) (w/ Boobie Lootaveli)
- All But 6 (2023) (w/ All But 6 & Fat Nick)
- All But 6 Vol. 2 (2024) (w/ All But 6 & Fat Nick)
- All but 6 Vol. 3 (2025) (w/ All But 6 & Fat Nick)

=== Singles ===
List of singles, with selected chart positions and certifications, showing year released and album name
| Title | Year | Certifications | Album |
|---|---|---|---|
| "Shotz from the Double Glock" (featuring Nell) | 2012 | | Don't Sleep On Me Hoe |
| "Get Buck" | 2013 | | Baby Bone |
| "IndigoB" (w/ Sdotbraddy & Denzel Curry) | 2013 | | WarBucks |
| "Fuck Yo Family" | 2014 | | Non-album single |
| "Stunna" | 2014 | | Stunna |
| "Buck Shot" | 2014 | | Non-album single |
| "Suicidal Thoughts in the Back of the Cadillac" | 2015 | | South Side Slugs |
| "Fuck Yuh Moms" (featuring Germ, Bodega Bamz & Tanboy Luka) | 2015 | | Non-album singles |
| "Lil Wayne 1999" (featuring Fat Nick & Shakewell) | 2016 | | Non-album singles |
| "Lil Wayne 2001" (featuring Shakewell) | 2016 | | Non-album singles |
| "Lil Wayne 2002" (featuring Shakewell) | 2016 | | Non-album singles |
| "Terminal Sex" (w/ Shakewell) | 2016 | | Non-album singles |
| "We All Not Shit" | 2016 | | Non-album singles |
| "Middle of the Mall" (w/ Fat Nick) | 2016 | | Drop Out of School |
| "Torch" (w/ Fat Nick) | 2017 | | Drop Out of School |
| "Death by Dishonor" (w/ Ghostemane & Shakewell) | 2017 | RIAA: Gold | Non-album singles |
| "1000 Rounds" (w/ Ghostemane) | 2017 | RIAA: Gold | Non-album singles |
| "2000 Rounds" (w/ Ghostemane) | 2017 | | Non-album singles |
| "Hate on Me" (w/ Fat Nick) | 2017 | | Non-album singles |
| "Daddy Issues" | 2017 | | FIVE FIVE |
| "Suicidal Thoughts in the Back of the Cadillac, Pt. 2" | 2017 | | FIVE FIVE |
| "Handshakes" | 2018 | | FIVE FIVE |
| "Gas" (w/ Barloe Team) | 2018 | | Non-album singles |
| "Stick Out" (w/ Ghostemane) | 2018 | | Non-album singles |
| "Sit Ups" (w/ Boobie Lootaveli) | 2018 | | Pouya & Boobie Lootaveli: Greatest Hits, Vol. 3 |
| "Florida Thang" | 2018 | | The South Got Something to Say |
| "Superman is Dead" | 2019 | | The South Got Something to Say |
| "Pe$os" (w/ Boobie Lootaveli) | 2019 | | Pouya & Boobie Lootaveli: Greatest Hits, Vol. 3 |
| "The Night Survives Again" (w/ Boobie Lootaveli) | 2019 | | Non-album single |
| "Six Speed" (featuring Juicy J) | 2019 | | The South Got Something to Say |
| "Bulletproof Shower Cap" (w/ City Morgue) | 2019 | | The South Got Something to Say |
| "Whatever Mane" (w/ Xavier Wulf) | 2019 | | The South Got Something to Say |
| "life? ... lol" (w/ Rocci) | 2019 | | The South Got Something to Say |
| "Bitch, Park Backwards" (w/ Boobie Lootaveli) | 2020 | | Pouya & Boobie Lootaveli: Greatest Hits, Vol. 1 |
| "Get Money (Take Money)" (w/ Boobie Lootaveli) | 2020 | | Pouya & Boobie Lootaveli: Greatest Hits, Vol. 1 |
| "Florida's Finest" (w/ Danny Towers) | 2020 | | Non-album singles |
| "Muddy Waters" (w/ Boobie Lootaveli) | 2020 | | Non-album singles |
| "Who Am I to Blame?" | 2020 | | Non-album singles |
| "Wrong Place, Right Time" (w/ SDotBraddy) | 2020 | | Non-album singles |
| "It's Over" (w/ Rocci) | 2020 | | Non-album singles |
| "Static" (w/ Fat Nick) | 2020 | | Drop Out of School 2 |
| "Lord of the Flies" (w/ Kxllswxtch) | 2021 | | Non-album single |
| "Leave Me Alone" | 2021 | | Blood Was Never Thick As Water |
| "Walk In" (w/ Lu) | 2021 | | Blood Was Never Thick As Water |
| "The First Step of Becoming God Is a Bottle to the Face" | 2021 | | Blood Was Never Thick As Water |
| "Burn" (w/ Kxllswxtch) | 2021 | | Non-album singles |
| "Florida Boy Do Your Dance!" | 2021 | | Non-album singles |
| "Wig Split" (w/ Denzel Curry) | 2021 | | Blood Was Never Thick As Water |
| "Pouya Turns 27" (w/ Mikey the Magician) | 2021 | | Non-album single |
| "Never Enough" (w/ Lu) | 2022 | | Dirt/Hurt/Pain |
| "Seven Figure Habits" (w/ Fat Nick) | 2022 | | Non-album singles |
| "Pissy" (w/ South Strip) | 2022 | | Non-album singles |
| "Kota" (w/ South Strip) | 2022 | | Non-album singles |
| "FMZ" (w/ All But 6 & Mikey the Magician) | 2022 | | All But 6 |
| "STFU" (w/ All But 6, South Strip & Kxllswxtch) | 2022 | | All But 6 |
| "Cum Rag" | 2022 | | Gator |
| "Seen It All Before" (w/ Delmar) | 2023 | | Gator |
| "Ruckus" (w/ South Strip) | 2023 | | Non-album single |
| "Hard to Break a Habit When You Fall in Love" | 2023 | | Gator |
| "Bitch Again" (w/ Yung Gravy) | 2023 | | Gator |
| "456 (Freestyle)" (w/ Lu, Kxllswxtch & Terror Reid) | 2023 | | Non-album singles |
| "Toolie Beam" (w/ 1nonly) | 2023 | | Non-album singles |
| "Midnight Sun" (w/ Terror Reid & SXMPRA) | 2023 | | Chrome Casketz |
| "When I Die" (w/ Christ Dillinger & Lil Darkie) | 2023 | | Non-album single |
| "Tomorrow Will Not Come" (w/ Terror Reid) | 2023 | | Chrome Casketz 2: Armageddon |
| "I Don't Go To Highschool" (w/ All But 6 & Mikey the Magician) | 2024 | | All But 6 Vol. 2 |
| "Blame Game" | 2024 | | They Could Never Make Me Hate You |

==== Guest appearances ====
List of non-single guest appearances, with other performing artists, showing year released and album name
| Title | Year | Other performer(s) | Album |
|---|---|---|---|
| "What Can I Do" | 2012 | Lil WooFy WooF, Nell | 90s Mentality '94 |
| "Bone Verses" | 2012 | Nell | 90s Mentality '94 |
| "Breathe" | 2013 | Bones | LivingLegend |
| "Rare Boys" | 2013 | Fat Nick, Mikey the Magician | Buffet Boys |
| "Hush Dat A$$" | 2013 | IndigoChildRick | —N/a |
| "Paper Soldiers" | 2014 | Black Smurf | Hustle God |
| "Drop Em' Off" | 2014 | Fat Nick, Germ | The Heart Attack |
| "Pull Up" | 2014 | Yung Simmie | Raider Klan Presents: Shut Up and Vibe 2 |
| "Kill Switch" | 2014 | Sir Michael Rocks, Robb Bank$ | Banco |
| "Half Bae" | 2015 | Robb Bank$ | Year of the Savage |
| "Runnin’ Thru 7th With My Woadies" | 2015 | Suicideboys | $outh $ide $uicide |
| "Droppin Bodies" | 2016 | Don Krez, Bodega Bamz, Fat Nick | —N/a |
| "Fuck You" | 2016 | Germ | Bad Shit |
| "Hypnotize" | 2016 | Mikey the Magician, Germ | Manifest |
| "ELDORADO" | 2016 | Ramirez, Shakewell | The Mystical Warlock |
| "Frontline" | 2016 | Don Krez, Issa Gold, Getter | —N/a |
| "TTYL (Remix)" | 2016 | Fat Nick, $uicideboy$, Sir Michael Rocks, Robb Bank$ | When the Lean Runs Out |
| "Slifer the Sky Dragon" | 2016 | Yung Yogi | —N/a |
| "Nina" | 2016 | Fat Nick | —N/a |
| "Buff Squad" | 2016 | Ramirez, Germ, Shakewell | —N/a |
| "BREAKDALAW2K16" | 2016 | $uicideboy$ | Eternal Grey |
| "Dat Stick (Remix)" | 2016 | Rich Brian, Ghostface Killah | —N/a |
| "Is that a leprechaun" | 2016 | Ramirez | —N/a |
| "On Her Mind" | 2017 | Volumes | Different Animals |
| "Sound of '94" | 2017 | Rojas On The Beat, Project Pat | —N/a |
| "Good Fellas" | 2017 | Craig Xen, Shakewell | Voltage |
| "10 Homies" | 2018 | Shakewell | Big Juice tha Sip |
| "Wet Em Up" | 2019 | Germ | GERM HAS A DEATHWISH |
| "Liquid Sunshine" | 2019 | Ramirez | Son of Serpentine |
| "The Boys Are Back in Town" | 2019 | Yung Gravy, Ramirez, TrippythaKid | Sensational |
| "That's My Baby" | 2019 | Yung Pinch | Back 2 the Beach |
| "Sunday" | 2019 | Danny Towers | Tarantula |
| "Outlawz" | 2020 | Terror Reid | Hot Vodka 1 |
| "Gold Thangs & Pinky Rangs (Da Hooptie)" | 2020 | Ramirez, Shakewell | THA PLAYA$ MANUAL |
| "Zit" | 2021 | Jasiah | War |
| "Put It In My Pocket" | 2022 | Boobie Lootaveli | LIFE ON OUR TERMS |
| "Ya Se Nada Es Perfecto" | 2022 | Rocci, Ramirez, Lu | ChaMEleon |
| "Bacon, Eggs, and Grits" | 2022 | Ramirez | The Tragedy of a Clown |
| "Love Bumps" | 2023 | Fat Nick | Hello I'm Vulnerable |
| "No Gimmix" | 2023 | Terror Reid | Hot Vodka 2 |
