= Board mix =

Recording from mixing console with real-time audio/sound mixing

A board mix is a recording created by running lines directly off a mixing console while the sound is mixed in real-time. The alternative to a board mix is use a virtual mixing console, an increasingly popular approach.
