= Westside Gravy =

American rapper and activist

Noah Shufutinsky
- Also known as: Westside Gravy; Young Gravy
- Born: November 3 1999; U.S.
- Genres: Hip hop, rap
- Occupations: Rapper, activist
- Years active: 2015–present

Noah Shufutinsky (born 1999), known by the stage name Westside Gravy (formerly Young Gravy), is an African-American Jewish rapper and activist.

== Biography ==
Shufutinsky was raised in San Diego, California by an African-American Sephardi Jewish mother and an Ashkenazi Russian-Jewish father. His father Anton served in the US Navy, leading to the family frequently moving, and he has an older brother Dmitri who made aliyah and served in the IDF. He attended Jewish day schools growing up, and studied Judaic Studies at George Washington University, from which he graduated in 2021, after which he moved to Hadera, Israel.

He cites reggae, soul, California oldies, hip-hop, and jazz, all of which he grew up listening to, as musical influences. Shufutinsky's music speaks about his lived experiences as a Black and Jewish man, and against racism and antisemitism. In his song "Stereotypes", he mocks the antisemitic and anti-Black stereotypes and prejudice he has to deal with. Shufutinsky has spoken about using music as a tool to educate about racism, antisemitism, and Jewish identity. He frequently sings multilingually, switching between English and Hebrew, and occasionally other languages like Russian and Spanish, in the same song.

Shufutinsky has been vocal about his support for Zionism and Israel, being the president of GW for Israel during college. In 2020, Shufutinsky performed for the AIPAC Policy Conference in Washington, and in 2021 for the Jewish National Fund-USA. His song "Diaspora" speaks out against BDS-led efforts to attack and delegitimize Israel.

== Discography ==
- 2750 Miles - 2016
- Monsters With Ink (EP) -2016
- '02 - 2016
- Kickin' (Single) - 2017
- On God (Single) - 2017
- Hands Up High (Single) - 2017
- Cali Boy (Single) - 2018
- Ignorance (Single) - 2018
- Summer '18 -2018
- Ethnic - 2018
- Diaspora (Single) - 2018?
- Fasholy Fasheezy (Single) - 2019
- Wish You Would (Single) - 2019
- Just Say No (Single) - 2019
- Black Man (Single) - 2019
- Balagan (Single) - 2019
- Benjamins Baby (Single) - 2020
- Foo (Single) - 2020
- Legacy (Single) - 2020
- Akhia (Single) - 2020
- Angry Black Man (Single) - 2020
- Yahud (Single) - 2021
- 40 Acres (Single) - 2021
- Too Hot (with Ben Lulu) (Single) - 2021
- Locations (Single) - 2021
- Black Kippah Activities - 2022
- Nostalgia (Single) - 2023
- King of the Hill (Single) - 2023
- Habibti Habibti (Single) - 2023
- Fauda (Single) - 2023
- Homeland (Single) - 2023
- No Apologies (Album) - 2025
- BKA II (EP) - 2026
