= Bbno$ =

Canadian rapper (born 1995)

bbno$
- bbno$ in 2026

Background information
- Born: Alexander Leon Gumuchian; June 30, 1995 (age 31); Vancouver, British Columbia, Canada
- Education: University of British Columbia Okanagan (BHk)
- Genres: Hip-hop; R&B; electronic; pop rap
- Occupations: Rapper; singer; songwriter
- Years active: 2014–present
- Labels: Republic; Broke
- Website: bbnomula.com

Alexander Leon Gumuchian (/ɡəˈmuːtʃiən/ gə-MOO-chee-ən; born June 30, 1995), known professionally as bbno$ ("baby no money"), is a Canadian rapper, singer, and songwriter. He became widely known for his 2019 single "Lalala" (featuring Y2K). He continued this success through collaborations with artists including Yung Gravy and his 2021 single "Edamame". In 2025 and 2026, he won the Juno Fan Choice Award.

== Early life ==
Alexander Leon Gumuchian was born in Vancouver on June 30, 1995, the son of an Armenian father from Egypt and a Danish-Swiss mother. He was homeschooled before he began high school. He was a competitive swimmer during high school. While growing up, his mother had encouraged him to learn piano, but he struggled with music theory. He has said that he was good with rhythm and enjoyed playing the djembe, but did not listen to music for fun until the age of 15. In 2019, he received a Bachelor of Human Kinetics (kinesiology) degree from the University of British Columbia Okanagan in Kelowna. As of 2019, he resides in Vancouver.

== Career ==
=== 2014–2016: Early work ===
bbno$ started making music after a back injury prevented him from pursuing his dream as a professional swimmer. He became interested in rapping and music production in 2014, when he began experimenting on GarageBand with a group of friends. He started making music for his own enjoyment with this group of friends, who later called themselves the Broke Boy Gang. After five or six months of performing live as a group and releasing multiple tracks online, the group broke up.

bbno$ began posting tracks on SoundCloud in September 2016 under the moniker bbnomula, quickly gaining millions of streams and followers. He gained unexpected popularity in China, where he sold out his first few "back-to-back" headlining tours. He credited his success there to Jackson Yee, a member of Chinese boy band TFBoys, after a video showed Yee dancing to the bbno$ song "Yoyo Tokyo" at his birthday party.

=== 2017–2024: Debut album and growing popularity ===
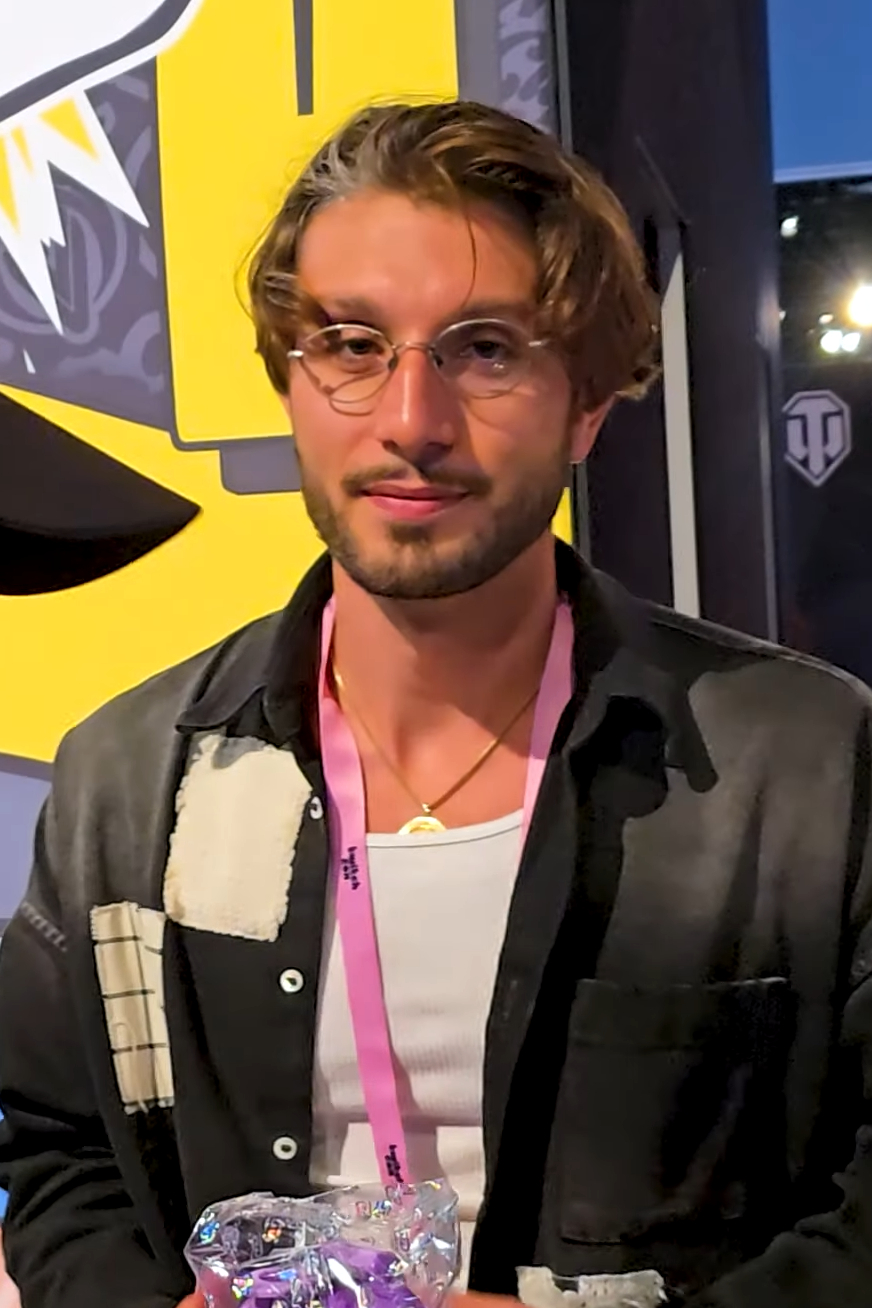
bbno$ in 2024

In 2017, bbno$ released his first EP, Baby Gravy, a collaboration with Yung Gravy, shortly before releasing his debut studio album, Bb Steps, and his second collaborative EP, Whatever, with So Loki in 2018.

In late 2019, bbno$ released his second studio album, Recess, which draws inspiration from the Disney series of the same name, and includes features from Y2K and Trippy Tha Kid. Many tracks off of Recess gained millions of streams on Spotify. bbno$ and Y2K have been recognized for marketing their single "Lalala" online by using various websites and online apps, namely Tinder, Instagram, TikTok, and Craigslist. The song peaked on over 20 charts around the world and gained over 1 billion streams worldwide. On March 17, 2023, the song was certified triple platinum by the Recording Industry Association of America for equivalent sales of three million units in the United States. Later in 2019, bbno$ would go on to release another album, I Don't Care at All. The album featured various pre-released singles, "Slop", "Pouch", and "Shining on My Ex", the latter of which featured frequent collaborator Yung Gravy. The album was solely produced by Y2K.

On February 14, 2020, Baby Gravy 2 was released properly in collaboration with Yung Gravy. It serves as a sequel to the 2017 EP Baby Gravy. The video for his single "Imma" features bbno$ in drag, travelling around Victoria with drag queen Jimbo.

On January 29, 2021, "Help Herself" was released. The song, produced by Diamond Pistols, was the first single from a new bbno$ project. Later in the year, on May 14, 2021, the five-song EP titled My Oh My was released. Three of the five songs, "Help Herself", "Bad to the Bone", and "Help Herself" (with Benee) had been released as singles prior to the EP. On July 24, 2021, "Edamame" featuring Rich Brian was released. This song was the first single from bbno$'s mixtape Eat Ya Veggies, and was later used in a trailer for The Garfield Movie. On October 8, 2021, bbno$ released Eat Ya Veggies. The sixth track in the album, "U Mad!", was included in the October 7, 2021 update of Counter-Strike: Global Offensive.

He released his first new single of 2022 on April 8, titled "Mathematics". bbno$ released the studio album Bag or Die on October 21, 2022. It includes the singles "Mathematics", "Piccolo", and "Sophisticated", along with a collaboration with Yung Gravy, "Touch Grass".

In 2023, bbno$ and Yung Gravy released Baby Gravy 3, his seventh studio album and third collaboration album with Yung Gravy. It includes the singles "Goodness Gracious", "You Need Jesus", and "Nightmare on Peachtree Street" featuring Freddie Dredd. He also featured on the Connor Price song "Not a Beanie".

In 2024, bbno$ released six singles, "BPOT (Bills Paid on Time)"; "Pho Real" (with Vietnamese rappers Low G and Anh Phan), "Lil Freak" (featuring YouTuber-streamer MoistCr1TiKaL in the music video), "It Boy", "Two", and "Meant to Be". That same year, he collaborated with Smosh's Ian Hecox and Anthony Padilla for the song "Submissive & Breedable".

=== 2025–present: bbno$, world tour ===
In October 2025, bbno$ released his self-titled seventh studio album bbno$, which included several of his single releases that year and the collaboration "1-800" with Ironmouse. bbno$ also cosplayed as Ironmouse following a challenge on social media.

For the weekend of December 12, bbno$ staged an in-game concert in the video game Peak alongside Ironmouse and Vanillamace.

On January 8, 2026, bbno$ released a new song, titled "Diamonds are Forever".

On November 7, 2026, bbno$ hosted The Internet For Palestine concert, donating all the proceeds. He performed with artists such as Joost Klien, Mxmtoon, Sophie Powers, MC Abdul, and more.

== Artistry ==
bbno$ has described his own music as "oxymoronic rap" that is "ignorant but melodic". bbno$ grew up listening to straight bass dubstep and house music from names like Datsik and Excision, before listening to hip hop artists, namely Tupac Shakur, Gucci Mane, and Chief Keef. He has cited Yung Lean and Pouya as his main rap inspirations.

== Discography ==
=== Studio albums ===
List of studio albums, with release date, label and selected chart positions shown
Title	Details	Peak chart positions						Certifications
Title	Details	CAN	FIN	LTU	NOR	NZ	US	Certifications
BB Steps	Released: July 12, 2018; Label: Self-released; Format: Digital download, streaming	—	—	—	—	—	—	
Recess	Released: January 25, 2019; Label: Self-released; Format: Digital download, streaming	—	—	—	—	—	—	
I Don't Care at All	Released: November 7, 2019; Label: Self-released; Format: Digital download, streaming	88	—	—	—	—	—	
Baby Gravy 2 (with Yung Gravy)	Released: February 14, 2020; Label: Republic; Format: LP, digital download, streaming, vinyl	—	—	—	—	—	188	
Good Luck Have Fun	Released: October 9, 2020; Label: Self-released; Format: CD, LP, digital download, streaming	—	—	—	—	—	—	
Eat Ya Veggies	Released: October 8, 2021; Label: Self-released; Format: CD, LP, digital download, streaming	36	19	17	32	—	—	RMNZ: Gold
Bag or Die	Released: October 21, 2022; Label: Self-released; Format: Digital download, streaming	—	—	83	—	—	—	
Baby Gravy 3 (with Yung Gravy)	Released: August 25, 2023; Label: Republic; Format: Digital download, streaming, vinyl	—	—	—	—	—	—	
bbno$	Released: October 17, 2025; Label: Broke; Format: Digital download, streaming	33	—	99	—	25	140	
"—" denotes releases that did not chart or were not released.

=== Extended plays ===
List of extended plays, with release date and label shown
Title	Details
Baby Gravy (with Yung Gravy)	Released: 2017; Label: Self-released; Formats: Digital download, streaming
Whatever (with So Loki)	Released: 2018; Label: Self-released; Formats: Digital download, streaming
Babydrip (with SwuM)	Released: 2018; Label: Self-released; Formats: Digital download, streaming
My Oh My	Released: 2021; Label: Self-released; Formats: Digital download, streaming

=== Singles ===
==== As lead artist ====
List of singles, with year released, selected chart positions and certifications shown
Title	Year	Peak chart positions										Certifications	Album
Title	Year	CAN	AUS	FIN	NOR	NZ	SWE	UK	US	US R&B	WW	Certifications	Album
"Lalala" (with Y2K or also featuring Carly Rae Jepsen and Enrique Iglesias)	2019	10	16	16	23	16	58	32	55	22	—	MC: 5× Platinum; ARIA: 2× Platinum; BPI: Gold; RIAA: 3× Platinum; RMNZ: 2× Platinum	Non-album single
"Bad Boy" (with Yung Bae and Billy Marchiafava)	2019	84	—	—	—	—	—	—	—	—	—		Bae 5
"Slop"	2019	—	—	—	—	— (Note: "Slop" did not enter the NZ Top 40 Singles Chart, but peaked at number 40 on the NZ Hot Singles Chart.)	—	—	—	—	—		I Don't Care at All
"Shining on My Ex" (with Yung Gravy)	2019	—	—	—	—	— (Note: "Shining on My Ex" did not enter the NZ Top 40 Singles Chart, but peaked at number 25 on the NZ Hot Singles Chart.)	—	—	—	—	—		I Don't Care at All and Baby Gravy 2
"Iunno" (with Yung Gravy)	2019	—	—	—	—	— (Note: "Iunno" did not enter the NZ Top 40 Singles Chart, but peaked at number 22 on the NZ Hot Singles Chart.)	—	—	—	—	—		Baby Gravy 2
"Welcome to Chilis" (with Yung Gravy)	2020	—	—	—	—	— (Note: "Welcome to Chilis" did not enter the NZ Top 40 Singles Chart, but peaked at number 40 on the NZ Hot Singles Chart.)	—	—	—	—	—		Baby Gravy 2
"Off the Goop" (with Yung Gravy and Cuco)	2020	—	—	—	—	—	—	—	—	—	—		Baby Gravy 2
"Out of Control" (with ceo@business.net and Lentra)	2020	—	—	—	—	—	—	—	—	—	—		Incentivize Unpaid Overtime
"Mememe" (with Lentra)	2020	—	—	—	—	—	—	—	—	—	—		Good Luck Have Fun
"Quarantine Freestyle" (with Lentra)	2020	—	—	—	—	—	—	—	—	—	—		Non-album singles
"What Would Baby Do?" (with Lentra)	2020	—	—	—	—	—	—	—	—	—	—		Non-album singles
"Bad Boy" (with Yung Bae and Max)	2020	—	—	—	—	—	—	—	—	—	—		Non-album singles
"Astrology" (with Lentra)	2020	—	—	—	—	—	—	—	—	—	—		Good Luck Have Fun
"Jack Money Bean" (with Yung Gravy and Lentra)	2020	—	—	—	—	—	—	—	—	—	—		Good Luck Have Fun and Gasanova
"Imma" (with Lentra)	2020	—	—	—	—	—	—	—	—	—	—		Good Luck Have Fun
"Backwards" (with Lentra)	2020	—	—	—	—	—	—	—	—	—	—		Good Luck Have Fun
"WaWaWa" (with Y2K)	2020	—	—	—	—	—	—	—	—	—	—		Non-album single
"Help Herself" (with Diamond Pistols or with Diamond Pistols and Benee)	2021	—	—	—	—	— (Note: "Help Herself" did not enter the NZ Top 40 Singles Chart, but peaked at number 13 on the NZ Hot Singles Chart.)	—	—	—	—	—	RMNZ: Gold	My Oh My
"Bad to the Bone" (with Lentra)	2021	—	—	—	—	—	—	—	—	—	—		My Oh My
"Wussup" (with Yung Gravy)	2021	—	—	—	—	—	—	—	—	—	—		Eat Ya Veggies
"Edamame" (featuring Rich Brian)	2021	13	23	8	24	21	—	89	— (Note: "Edamame" did not enter the Billboard Hot 100, but peaked at number 22 on the Bubbling Under Hot 100 chart.)	—	165	MC: 5× Platinum; BPI: Gold; RIAA: Gold; RMNZ: 2× Platinum	Eat Ya Veggies
"Take a Trip" (with ceo@business.net and Jungle Bobby)	2021	—	—	—	—	—	—	—	—	—	—		Non-album single
"Yoga" (featuring Rebecca Black)	2021	—	—	—	—	— (Note: "Yoga" did not enter the NZ Top 40 Singles Chart, but peaked at number forty on the NZ Hot Singles Chart.)	—	—	—	—	—		Eat Ya Veggies
"Mathematics"	2022	—	—	—	—	— (Note: "Mathematics" did not enter the NZ Top 40 Singles Chart, but peaked at number 29 on the NZ Hot Singles Chart.)	—	—	—	—	—		Bag or Die
"Piccolo"	2022	—	—	—	—	— (Note: "Piccolo" did not enter the NZ Top 40 Singles Chart, but peaked at number 26 on the NZ Hot Singles Chart.)	—	—	—	—	—		Bag or Die
"Sophisticated"	2022	—	—	—	—	—	—	—	—	—	—		Bag or Die
"C'est la Vie" (with Yung Gravy and Rich Brian)	2022	—	—	—	—	—	—	—	—	—	—		Marvelous
"Touch Grass" (with Yung Gravy)	2022	—	—	—	—	— (Note: "Touch Grass" did not enter the NZ Top 40 Singles Chart, but peaked at number 28 on the NZ Hot Singles Chart.)	—	—	—	—	—		Bag or Die
"Still"	2023	—	—	—	—	—	—	—	—	—	—		Non-album singles
"Ushme Uturbe" (with Kalush Orchestra and Ditvak)	2023	—	—	—	—	—	—	—	—	—	—		Non-album singles
"Goodness Gracious" (with Yung Gravy)	2023	—	—	—	—	— (Note: "Goodness Gracious" did not enter the NZ Top 40 Singles Chart, but peaked at number 36 on the NZ Hot Singles Chart.)	—	—	—	—	—		Baby Gravy 3
"It Happens" (with Little Big)	2023	—	—	—	—	—	—	—	—	—	—		Non-album singles
"We Are Not the Same" (with Marcus & Martinus)	2024	—	—	—	—	—	—	—	—	—	—		Non-album singles
"Pho'real" (with Anh Phan and Low G)	2024	—	—	—	—	—	—	—	—	—	—		Non-album singles
"Submissive & Breedable" (with Smosh)	2024	—	—	—	—	—	—	—	—	—	—		Non-album singles
"Lil' Freak"	2024	—	—	—	—	— (Note: "Lil' Freak" did not enter the NZ Top 40 Singles Chart, but peaked at number 33 on the NZ Hot Singles Chart.)	—	—	—	—	—		Non-album singles
"It Boy"	2024	—	—	—	—	— (Note: "It Boy" did not enter the NZ Top 40 Singles Chart, but peaked at number 35 on the NZ Hot Singles Chart.)	—	—	—	—	—		bbno$
"Two"	2024	—	—	—	—	— (Note: "Two" did not enter the NZ Top 40 Singles Chart, but peaked at number 22 on the NZ Hot Singles Chart.)	—	—	—	—	—	RIAA: Gold	bbno$
"Meant to Be"	2024	—	—	—	—	— (Note: "Meant to Be" did not enter the NZ Top 40 Singles Chart, but peaked at number 25 on the NZ Hot Singles Chart.)	—	—	—	—	—		Non-album single
"Check"	2025	62	—	—	—	—	—	—	—	—	—		bbno$
"Antidepressants"	2025	—	—	—	—	— (Note: "Antidepressants" did not enter the NZ Top 40 Singles Chart, but peaked at number 17 on the NZ Hot Singles Chart.)	—	—	—	—	—		Non-album single
"Boom"	2025	—	—	—	—	— (Note: "Boom" did not enter the NZ Top 40 Singles Chart, but peaked at number 23 on the NZ Hot Singles Chart.)	—	—	—	—	—		bbno$
"Mary Poppins"	2025	—	—	—	—	—	—	—	—	—	—		Non-album singles
"Check (Hatsune Miku)" (as bbnogames; with Tommy. and Hatsune Miku)	2025	—	—	—	—	—	—	—	—	—	—		Non-album singles
"1-800" (with Ironmouse)	2025	—	—	—	—	— (Note: "1-800" did not enter the NZ Top 40 Singles Chart, but peaked at number 27 on the NZ Hot Singles Chart.)	—	—	—	—	—		bbno$
"Hot Topic"	2025	—	—	—	—	—	—	—	—	—	—		bbno$
"NSFW"	2025	—	—	—	—	—	—	—	—	—	—		bbno$
"Fight or Flight" (with Zoey808)	2025	—	—	—	—	—	—	—	—	—	—		WhoIsZoey?
"Yezzir"	2025	—	—	—	—	—	—	—	—	—	—		bbno$
"Gigolo"	2025	—	—	—	—	— (Note: "Gigolo" did not enter the NZ Top 40 Singles Chart, but peaked at number 12 on the NZ Hot Singles Chart.)	—	—	—	—	—		bbno$
"ADD"	2025	—	—	—	—	—	—	—	—	—	—		bbno$
"Come to Brazil"	2026	—	—	—	—	—	—	—	—	—	—		bbno$
"—" denotes releases that did not chart or were not released.

==== As featured artist ====
Title	Year	Peak chart positions	Certifications	Album
Title	Year	ITA	Certifications	Album
"Mayo, No Fries!" (Joost Klein featuring bbno$)	2020	—		Joost Klein 7
"0ffline" (Thasup featuring bbno$)	2020	11	FIMI: Platinum	23 6451
"Che uomo" (Tuzzo featuring Nello Taver, bbno$ and Young Miles)	2022	—		Non-album singles
"Ticking Away" (Valorant featuring Grabbitz & bbno$)	2023	—		Non-album singles
"Not A Beanie" (Connor Price featuring bbno$)	2023			Non-album singles
"Tango" (Tommy Cash featuring bbno$)	2024	—		Non-album singles
"Submissive & Breedable" (Smosh featuring bbno$)	2024	—		Non-album singles
"Cold Island" (My Singing Monsters featuring bbno$ as bbli$zard)	2025	—		Non-album singles
"—" denotes releases that did not chart or were not released.

=== Other charted songs ===
Title	Year	Peak chart positions	Album
Title	Year	NZ Hot	Album
"Bing Bong" (with Vnlla)	2025	23	bbno$

== Awards and nominations ==
Year	Award	Nominee / work	Category	Result	Ref.
2020	Juno Awards	bbno$	Fan Choice Award	Nominated	
2020	Juno Awards	bbno$	Breakthrough Artist of the Year	Nominated	
2021	Juno Awards	Baby Gravy 2 (with Yung Gravy)	Rap Recording of the Year	Nominated	
2022	Juno Awards	bbno$	Fan Choice Award	Nominated	
2022	Juno Awards	"Edamame" (feat. Rich Brian)	Rap Single of the Year	Nominated	
2024	Juno Awards	Bag or Die	Rap Album/EP of the Year	Nominated	
2025	Juno Awards	bbno$	Fan Choice Award	Won	
2026	Juno Awards	bbno$	Artist of the Year	Nominated	
2026	Juno Awards	bbno$	Fan Choice Award	Won	
