= Yung Gravy =

American rapper (born 1996)

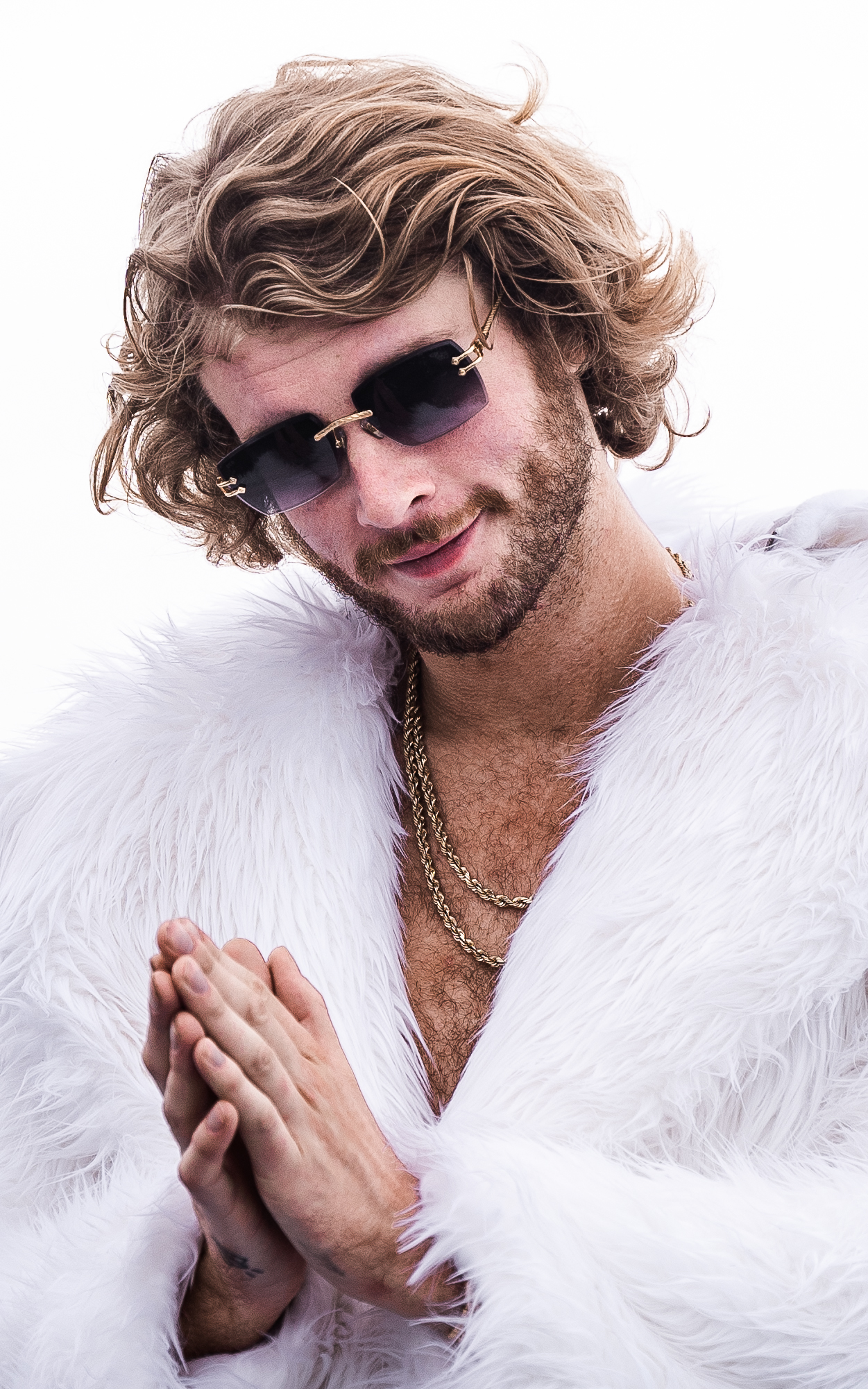
- Yung Gravy in 2023

Background information
- Also known as: Mr. Butter; Clancy Brett; Daddy Aioli; Mr. Clean; Lil Steamer; Yung Gravity
- Born: Matthew Raymond Hauri; March 19, 1996 (age 30); Rochester, Minnesota, U.S.
- Genres: Hip hop; trap; comedy hip hop
- Occupations: Rapper; singer; songwriter; model; actor
- Years active: 2016–present
- Labels: BMG; Republic (former)
- Website: yunggravy.com

Matthew Raymond Hauri (born March 19, 1996), better known by his stage name Yung Gravy, is an American rapper.

== Early life, family and education ==
Matthew Raymond Hauri was born on March 19, 1996 in Rochester, Minnesota. His father, Peter Johannes Hauri (1933–2013), was a Swiss-born psychologist who specialized in treating insomnia; his mother is psychiatrist Cynthia Cleveland Hauri.

Hauri graduated from Mayo High School in 2014. He attended the University of Wisconsin–Madison and earned a marketing degree in December 2017.

== Career ==
While attending college, Hauri developed branding strategies for start-up companies, and started multiple companies of his own.

Inspired by the rise of rappers such as Lil Yachty and Lil Peep, he started his music career on SoundCloud. In 2017, he quit his other jobs and dedicated himself to making music, spending months self-recording songs.

He first gained recognition for his 2017 songs "Mr. Clean" and "1 Thot 2 Thot Red Thot Blue Thot", both of which gained traction on SoundCloud and received platinum certifications by the Recording Industry Association of America (RIAA). He is often associated with the SoundCloud rap era as well as Canadian rapper bbno$, with whom he has released two collaborative albums and one extended play. His 2022 single, "Betty (Get Money)" marked his first entry on the Billboard Hot 100 at number 30 and likewise received platinum certification.

His discography consists of one mixtape, four albums, and seven extended plays. He has collaborated with artists including Lil Baby, Juicy J, T-Pain, Dillon Francis, and Lil Wayne, as well as television personality Martha Stewart.

The 2025 video game Dispatch features Yung Gravy's voice as the character Golem, a large sentient construct made of clay.

=== Selected events ===
In April 2021, Yung Gravy received recognition from the professional hockey team Tampa Bay Lightning, who inscribed the title of Yung Gravy’s track "Gravy Train," one of the team's post-game victory songs, on their 2020 Stanley Cup rings. In 2022, Yung Gravy performed at the pregame performance for the Minnesota Vikings and New England Patriots NFL football game on Thanksgiving Day. In 2022, he was also featured on both Jimmy Kimmel Live and the MTV Video Music Awards Pre-Show, performing his hit single, “Betty (Get Money)." In January 2023, Yung Gravy performed at the X Games, hosted in Aspen, Colorado; he also participated in the Special Olympics Unified Skiing competition, where he raced against professional freeskier Tom Wallisch.

== Musical style and influences ==
Yung Gravy's musical style is a blend of trap music with vintage themes often inspired by soul music of the 1950s and 1960s and soul and funk music of the 1960s, '70s and '80s: For example, his song "Gravy Train" samples Maxine Nightingale's 1976 "Right Back Where We Started From", and his breakout hit "Mr. Clean" samples the 1954 song "Mr. Sandman" by The Chordettes.

His musical style has been described as amusing, energetic, authentic, and bold. Yung Gravy has cited musicians from multiple genres as inspirations; including hip-hop acts, such as Outkast and Three 6 Mafia; and soul acts, ranging from Smokey Robinson to The Blackbyrds. Yung Gravy is 6 feet 8 in (2.03m) tall, though he has mentioned being 6'6" in a song because it flowed better lyrically.

== Discography ==
Yung Gravy discography
- Studio albums: 6
- EPs: 8
- Singles: 31
- Mixtapes: 1

=== Studio albums ===
List of albums, with selected details and chart positions
Title	Details	Peak chart positions
Title	Details	US
Sensational	Released: May 31, 2019; Label: Republic; Formats: Digital download, streaming, vinyl	52
Baby Gravy 2 (with bbno$)	Released: February 14, 2020; Label: Republic; Formats: Digital download, streaming, vinyl	188
Gasanova	Released: October 2, 2020; Label: Republic; Formats: Digital download, streaming, vinyl	52
Marvelous	Released: October 28, 2022; Label: Republic; Formats: Digital download, streaming, vinyl	99
Baby Gravy 3 (with bbno$)	Released: August 25, 2023; Label: Republic; Formats: Digital download, streaming, vinyl	—
Serving Country	Released: August 2, 2024; Label: Republic; Formats: Digital download, streaming	—

=== Extended plays ===
List of extended plays, with selected details
Title	Details
Mr. Clean	Released: September 8, 2016; Label: Self-released; Format: Digital download
Yung Gravity	Released: April 20, 2017; Label: Self-released; Format: Digital download
Baby Gravy (with bbno$)	Released: October 11, 2017; Label: Self-released; Format: Digital download
Snow Cougar	Released: May 4, 2018; Label: Republic; Format: Digital download
Tracy's Ultimate Fitness Mix	Released: January 2021; Label: Self-released; Format: Digital download
Gravy Train Down Memory Lane: Side A	Released: April 23, 2021; Label: Republic; Format: Digital download
Gravy Train Down Memory Lane: Side B	Released: April 30, 2021; Label: Republic; Format: Digital download
Cake and Cognac (with Dillon Francis)	Released: February 4, 2022; Label: Imperial; Format: Digital download

=== Mixtapes ===
List of mixtapes, with selected details
Title	Details
Thanksgiving's Eve	Released: December 23, 2016; Label: Self-released; Format: Digital download

=== Singles ===
List of singles as lead artist, with showing year released, chart positions, certifications, and album name
Title	Year	Peak chart positions									Certifications	Album
Title	Year	US	US Alt.	US Pop	AUS	CAN	IRE	NZ	UK	WW	Certifications	Album
"Mr. Clean"	2016	—	—	—	—	—	—	—	—	—	RIAA: Platinum; RMNZ: Gold	Mr. Clean and Snow Cougar
"Cheryl"	2017	—	—	—	—	—	—	—	—	—	RIAA: Gold	Gravy Train Down Memory Lane: Side B
"1 Thot 2 Thot Red Thot Blue Thot"	2017	—	—	—	—	—	—	—	—	—	RIAA: Platinum; RMNZ: Gold	Snow Cougar and Sensational
"Knockout"	2018	—	—	—	—	—	—	—	—	—		Snow Cougar
"Pizzazz"	2018	—	—	—	—	—	—	—	—	—		Sensational
"Alley Oop" (featuring Lil Baby)	2018	—	—	—	—	—	—	—	—	—	RIAA: Gold	Sensational
"Magic"	2019	—	—	—	—	—	—	—	—	—	RIAA: Gold	Sensational
"Buttered Up" (featuring Juicy J)	2019	—	—	—	—	—	—	—	—	—		Sensational
"Whip a Tesla" (with bbno$)	2019	—	—	—	—	—	—	—	—	—	RIAA: Gold	Sensational
"Tampa Bay Bustdown" (featuring Chief Keef and Y2K)	2019	—	—	—	—	—	—	—	—	—		Gasanova
"Shining on My Ex" (with bbno$)	2019	—	—	—	—	—	—	— (Note: "Shining on My Ex" did not enter the NZ Top 40 Singles Chart, but peaked at number 25 on the NZ Hot Singles Chart.)	—	—	RIAA: Gold	I Don't Care at All and Baby Gravy 2
"Iunno" (with bbno$)	2019	—	—	—	—	—	—	— (Note: "Iunno" did not enter the NZ Top 40 Singles Chart, but peaked at number 21 on the NZ Hot Singles Chart.)	—	—		Baby Gravy 2
"Welcome to Chilis" (with bbno$)	2020	—	—	—	—	—	—	— (Note: "Welcome to Chilis" did not enter the NZ Top 40 Singles Chart, but peaked at number 40 on the NZ Hot Singles Chart.)	—	—	RIAA: Gold	Baby Gravy 2
"Off the Goop" (with bbno$ featuring Cuco)	2020	—	—	—	—	—	—	—	—	—		Baby Gravy 2
"Jack Money Bean" (with bbno$ and Lentra)	2020	—	—	—	—	—	—	—	—	—		Gasanova
"Yup!"	2020	—	—	—	—	—	—	—	—	—		Gasanova
"Gas Money"	2020	—	—	—	—	—	—	—	—	—		Gasanova
"Oops!"	2020	— (Note: "Oops!" did not enter the Billboard Hot 100, but peaked at number 23 on the Bubbling Under Hot 100 Singles chart.)	40	38	—	—	—	—	—	—	RIAA: Gold; RMNZ: Gold	Gasanova
"Steppin on the Beat" (with TrippythaKid)	2021	—	—	—	—	—	—	—	—	—		Marvellous
"Hot Tub" (with Dillon Francis and T-Pain)	2022	—	—	—	—	—	—	— (Note: "Hot Tub" did not enter the NZ Top 40 Singles Chart, but peaked at number 37 on the NZ Hot Singles Chart.)	—	—		Cake and Cognac
"Betty (Get Money)"	2022	30	—	12	25	36	50	23	73	81	RIAA: Platinum; ARIA: 3× Platinum; MC: Platinum; RMNZ: Platinum	Marvelous
"C'est la Vie" (with bbno$ and Rich Brian)	2022	—	—	—	—	—	—	— (Note: "C'est la Vie" did not enter the NZ Top 40 Singles Chart, but peaked at number 13 on the NZ Hot Singles Chart.)	—	—	RIAA: Gold	Marvelous
"She's A 10 But... (Remix)" (with ARTAN)	2023	—	—	—	—	—	—	—	—	—		Non-album singles
"Bitch Again" (with Pouya)	2023	—	—	—	—	—	—	—	—	—		Non-album singles
"Strawberries & Creamin'"	2023	—	—	—	—	—	—	—	—	—		Non-album singles
"Goodness Gracious" (with bbno$)	2023	—	—	—	—	—	—	—	—	—		Non-album singles
"You Need Jesus" (with bbno$)	2023	—	—	—	—	—	—	—	—	—		Non-album singles
"Everest" (with Dream)	2023	—	—	—	—	—	—	— (Note: "Everest" did not enter the NZ Top 40 Singles Chart, but peaked at number 37 on the NZ Hot Singles Chart.)	—	—		To Whoever Wants to Hear
"Nightmare on Peachtree Street" (with bbno$ and Freddie Dredd)	2023	—	—	—	—	—	—	— (Note: "Nightmare on Peachtree Street" did not enter the NZ Top 40 Singles Chart, but peaked at number 40 on the NZ Hot Singles Chart.)	—	—		Non-album singles
"AF1 2.0" (with Lilbubblegum)	2024	—	—	—	—	—	—	—	—	—		Non-album singles
"Clementine'"	2024	—	—	—	—	—	—	—	—	—		Serving Country
"White Claw" (with Shania Twain)	2024	—	—	—	—	—	—	—	—	—		Serving Country
"Lone Ranger'"	2024	—	—	—	—	—	—	—	—	—		Serving Country
"I Write Hymns Not Travesties" (feat. Brendon Urie)	2025	—	—	—	—	—	—	—	—	—		Non-album singles
"Debbie"	2025											Non-album singles
"HBO"	2026	—	—	—	—	—	—	—	—	—		Invasion of the Thotty Snatchers
"my b!tch"	2026											Non-album singles
"my ch!ck"	2026											Non-album singles
"BAEWATCH"	2026											Non-album singles

=== Other certified songs ===
Title	Year	Certifications	Album
"Rotisserie" (with bbno$)	2017	RIAA: Gold	Baby Gravy
"The Boys are Back in Town" (feat. Pouya, Ramirez, TrippyThaKid)	2019	RIAA: Gold	Sensational
"Gravy Train"	2019	RIAA: Gold	Sensational
