= Dominic Fike discography =

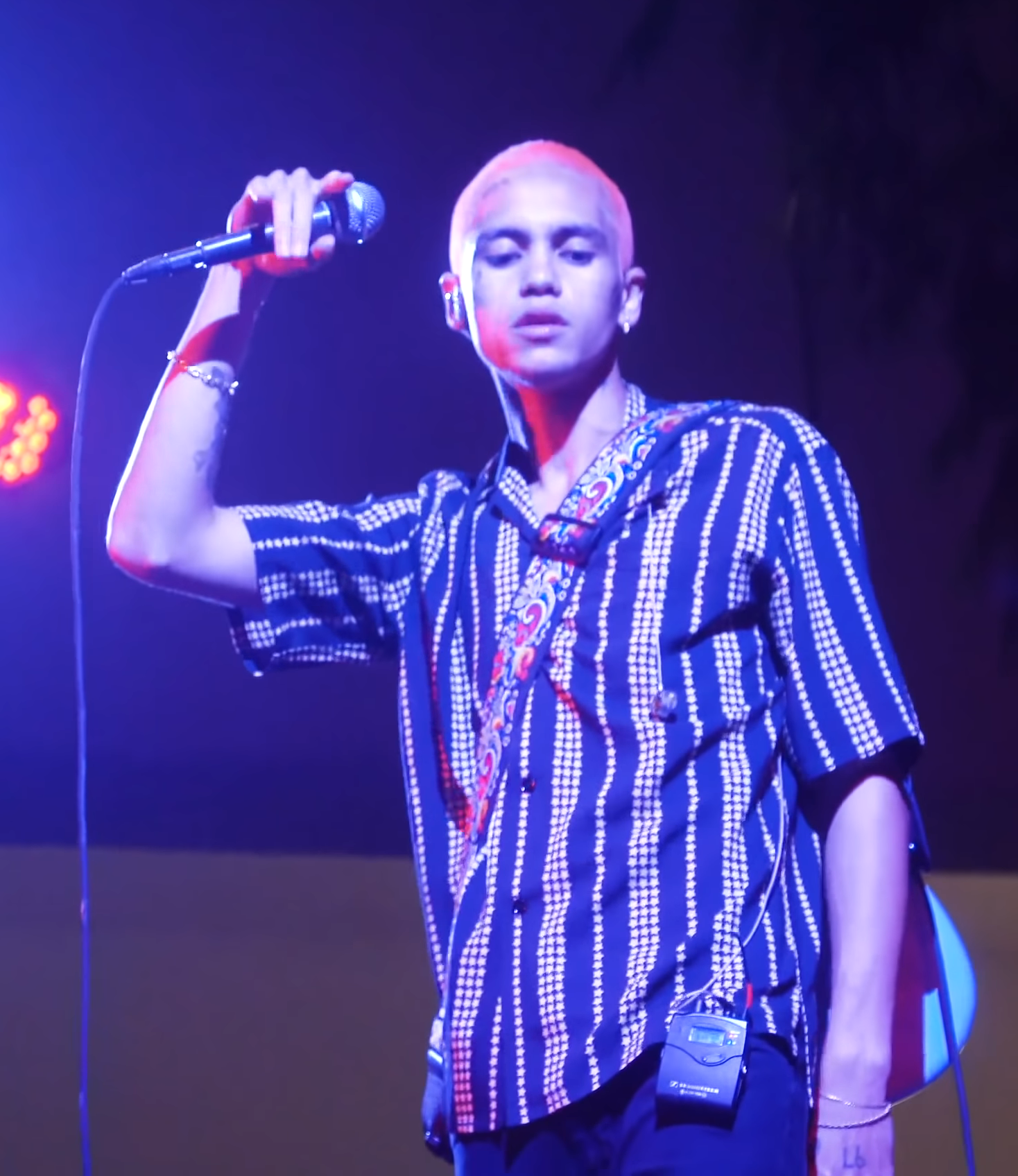
- Fike performing in 2019
- Studio albums: 3
- EPs: 2
- Mixtapes: 1
- Singles: 20

The discography of American singer-songwriter Dominic Fike consists of three studio albums, two extended plays, one mixtape, and twenty singles. All three of his studio albums debuted in the Billboard 200. Fike was listed in two songs being a featured artist, he also appeared to various artists as a guest appearance of non-single guest appearances, with other performing artists credited up to 14 songs. His debut extended play Don't Forget About Me, Demos was recorded while he was on house arrest back in late 2017 which became his official major-label debut released in October 2018, with a 2019 reissue with two additional tracks. He released his second EP in 2024 titled 14 Minutes uploading a YouTube video of him running to the 14-minute long EP, and the following year releasing his first mixtape Rocket.

Fike's debut album What Could Possibly Go Wrong released in July 2020 was met with favorable acclaim and charted in various countries, while his second album Sunburn was released in July 2023 to favorable reception and also charted in various countries. The latter included the track "Mona Lisa", which was featured in the film Spider-Man: Across the Spider-Verse. It was originally included on the deluxe edition of the Spider-Man: Across the Spider-Verse soundtrack, but the song was later removed and instead added to some versions of Sunburn. He has received certifications for his songs "3 Nights" (2018), "Phone Numbers" (2019), "Elliot's Song" (2022), "Mona Lisa" (2023), "Misses" (2024), "White Keys" (2025), and his resurfaced song released back in 2019, "Babydoll" (2026), amongst other released songs.

== Studio albums ==
List of studio albums, with release date and label shown
Title	Details	Peak chart positions										Certifications
Title	Details	US	US Rock	AUS	BEL (FL)	CAN	GRE	IRE	NZ	SCO	UK	Certifications
What Could Possibly Go Wrong	Released: July 31, 2020; Label: Columbia; Formats: CD, LP, cassette, digital download, streaming	41	4	34	—	50	—	73	28	—	— (Note: What Could Possibly Go Wrong did not enter the UK Albums Chart, but peaked at number 98 on the UK Albums Streaming Chart.)	RMNZ: Gold
Sunburn	Released: July 7, 2023; Label: Columbia; Formats: CD, LP, cassette, digital download, streaming	30	3	25	144	28	90	73	9	57	56	RMNZ: Gold
How to Quit Smoking	Released: October 30, 2026; Label: Columbia; Formats: LP, digital download, streaming	69	20	22	—	63	—	—	11	—	—	
"—" denotes a recording that did not chart.

== Mixtapes ==
List of mixtape albums, with release date and label shown
Title	Details	Peak chart positions	
Title	Details	AUS	NZ
Rocket	Released: August 22, 2025; Label: Columbia; Formats: LP, streaming	63	33

== Extended plays ==
Title	Details	Peak chart positions			Certifications
Title	Details	US	CAN	NZ	Certifications
Don't Forget About Me, Demos	Released: October 16, 2018; Label: Columbia; Formats: Digital download, streaming, 12-inch EP	76	44	—	MC: Gold; RMNZ: 2× Platinum
14 Minutes	Released: April 24, 2024; Label: Columbia; Formats: CD, LP, streaming	—	—	33	
"—" denotes a recording that did not chart or was not released in that territory.

== Singles ==
=== As lead artist ===
List of singles as lead artist, with year released and album details shown
Title	Year	Peak chart positions										Certifications	Album
Title	Year	US	US Rock	AUS	CAN	IRE	NLD	NZ	SWE	UK	WW	Certifications	Album
"3 Nights"	2018	— (Note: "3 Nights" did not enter the Billboard Hot 100, but peaked at number 21 on the Bubbling Under Hot 100 chart.)	— (Note: "3 Nights" did not enter the US Hot Rock & Alternative Songs chart, but peaked at number four on the Rock & Alternative Airplay chart.)	3	—	2	12	6	— (Note: "3 Nights" did not enter the main chart in Sweden, but peaked at number 2 on the Swedish Heatseeker Chart.)	3	—	RIAA: 4× Platinum; ARIA: 7× Platinum; BPI: 3× Platinum; MC: 5× Platinum; NVPI: Gold; RMNZ: 6× Platinum	Don't Forget About Me, Demos
"Açaí Bowl"	2019	—	—	—	—	—	—	— (Note: "Açaí Bowl" did not enter the NZ Top 40 Singles Chart, but peaked at number 29 on the NZ Hot Singles Chart.)	—	—	—		Non-album singles
"Rollerblades"	2019	—	—	—	—	—	—	—	—	—	—		Non-album singles
"Phone Numbers" (with Kenny Beats)	2019	—	—	—	—	—	—	— (Note: "Phone Numbers" did not enter the NZ Top 40 Singles Chart, but peaked at number 15 on the NZ Hot Singles Chart.)	—	—	—	RIAA: Platinum; ARIA: Gold; BPI: Gold; MC: Platinum; RMNZ: Platinum	Non-album singles
"Hit Me Up" (with Omar Apollo and Kenny Beats)	2019	—	—	—	—	—	—	—	—	—	—		Non-album singles
"Chicken Tenders"	2020	—	22	—	—	—	—	—	—	—	—		What Could Possibly Go Wrong
"Politics & Violence"	2020	—	40	—	—	—	—	—	—	—	—		What Could Possibly Go Wrong
"Photo ID" (with Remi Wolf)	2021	—	—	—	—	—	—	—	—	—	—		We Love Dogs!
"The Kiss of Venus" (with Paul McCartney)	2021	—	—	—	—	—	—	— (Note: "The Kiss of Venus" did not enter the NZ Top 40 Singles Chart, but peaked at number 31 on the NZ Hot Singles Chart.)	—	—	—		McCartney III Imagined
"Elliot's Song" (with Zendaya)	2022	— (Note: "Elliot's Song" did not enter the Billboard Hot 100, but peaked at number six on the Bubbling Under Hot 100 chart.)	10	66	77	51	—	— (Note: "Elliot's Song" did not enter the NZ Top 40 Singles Chart, but peaked at number three on the NZ Hot Singles Chart.)	92	91	147		Euphoria: Season 2 (An HBO Original Series Soundtrack)
"Dancing in the Courthouse"	2023	—	20	—	—	—	—	— (Note: "Dancing in the Courthouse" did not enter the NZ Top 40 Singles Chart, but peaked at number 13 on the NZ Hot Singles Chart.)	—	—	—		Sunburn
"Ant Pile"	2023	—	31	—	—	—	—	— (Note: "Ant Pile" did not enter the NZ Top 40 Singles Chart, but peaked at number 14 on the NZ Hot Singles Chart.)	—	—	—		Sunburn
"Mona Lisa"	2023	89	6	92	62	47	—	— (Note: "Mona Lisa" did not enter the NZ Top 40 Singles Chart, but peaked at number 31 on the NZ Hot Singles Chart.)	—	66	—	RIAA: Gold; BPI: Silver; RMNZ: Gold	Sunburn
"Mama's Boy"	2023	—	38	—	—	—	—	— (Note: "Mama's Boy" did not enter the NZ Top 40 Singles Chart, but peaked at number 20 on the NZ Hot Singles Chart.)	—	—	—	RIAA: Platinum; RMNZ: Gold	Sunburn
"White Keys"	2025	32	6	13	24	5	10	7	19	7	28	RIAA: Platinum; BPI: Gold; GLF: Gold; MC: Platinum; RMNZ: Platinum	How to Quit Smoking
"Images of Love" (with Hether)	2025	—	—	—	—	—	—	—	—	—	—		Holy Water
"Babydoll"	2026	10	2	62	10	6	7	—	10	5	2	RIAA: 4× Platinum; ARIA: 3× Platinum; BPI: 2× Platinum; MC: Platinum; NVPI: Platinum; RMNZ: 5× Platinum	Don't Forget About Me, Demos
"Wallflower"	2026	—	45	—	—	—	—	— (Note: "Wallflower" did not enter the NZ Top 40 Singles Chart, but peaked at number 14 on the NZ Hot Singles Chart.)	—	—	—		How to Quit Smoking
"Small Town" (with Gabriel Jacoby)	2026	—	39	—	—	—	—	— (Note: "Small Town" did not enter the NZ Top 40 Singles Chart, but peaked at number 13 on the NZ Hot Singles Chart.)	—	—	—		How to Quit Smoking
"Pangea"	2026	—	40	—	—	—	—	—	—	—	—		How to Quit Smoking
"—" denotes a recording that did not chart or was not released in that territory.

=== As featured artist ===
List of singles as featured artist, with year released and album details shown
Title	Year	Peak chart positions										Album
Title	Year	US	CAN	HK	KOR	MLY	NZ Hot	SGP	TWN	UK	WW	Album
"Love Hangover" (Jennie featuring Dominic Fike)	2025	96	72	10	35	9	7	5	9	64	29	Ruby
"Reputation" (Ravyn Lenae featuring Dominic Fike)	2026	—	—	—	—	—	6	—	—	—	—	Blue Island
"—" denotes a recording that did not chart or was not released in that territory.

== Other charted and certified songs ==
List of other charted songs, with year released and album details shown
Title	Year	Peak chart positions										Certifications	Album
Title	Year	US	US Rock	AUS	CAN	DEN	IRE	NZ Hot	SWE	UK	WW	Certifications	Album
"She Wants My Money"	2018	—	—	—	—	—	—	—	—	—	—	RIAA: Gold; RMNZ: Gold	Don't Forget About Me, Demos
"Why"	2020	—	—	—	—	—	—	—	—	—	—	RIAA: Gold; MC: Gold; RMNZ: Gold	What Could Possibly Go Wrong?
"Vampire"	2020	—	31	—	—	—	—	—	—	—	—		What Could Possibly Go Wrong?
"Superstar Sh*t"	2020	—	—	—	—	—	—	—	—	—	—	RIAA: Gold	What Could Possibly Go Wrong?
"Terms" (with Slowthai and Denzel Curry)	2021	—	—	—	—	—	88	11	—	71	—		Tyron
"Die for You" (Justin Bieber featuring Dominic Fike)	2021	81	—	66	40	29	—	—	99	—	57		Justice
"How Much Is Weed?"	2023	—	25	—	—	—	—	13	—	—	—		Sunburn
"Think Fast" (featuring Weezer)	2023	—	15	—	—	—	—	10	—	—	—		Sunburn
"Sick"	2023	—	41	—	—	—	—	23	—	—	—		Sunburn
"7 Hours"	2023	—	37	—	—	—	—	22	—	—	—		Sunburn
"Bodies"	2023	—	44	—	—	—	—	—	—	—	—		Sunburn
"Sunburn"	2023	—	48	—	—	—	—	—	—	—	—		Sunburn
"Frisky"	2023	—	46	—	—	—	—	—	—	—	—		Sunburn
"Hey Blondie"	2023	—	25	—	—	—	—	—	—	—	—		Barbie the Album
"Hi Grace"	2024	—	48	—	—	—	—	28	—	—	—		14 Minutes
"Thickrick"	2024	—	—	—	—	—	—	31	—	—	—		14 Minutes
"Misses"	2024	99	15	36	71	—	23	15	—	34	196	RIAA: Platinum; BPI: Silver; RMNZ: Gold	14 Minutes
"Coast2coast"	2024	—	—	—	—	—	—	26	—	—	—		14 Minutes
"Aftermath"	2025	—	—	—	—	—	—	38	—	—	—		Rocket
"Casting Call"	2026	—	37	—	—	—	—	6	—	—	—		How to Quit Smoking
"Doomsday"	2026	—	—	—	—	—	—	15	—	—	—		How to Quit Smoking
"Honeylove" (featuring Grace Ives)	2026	—	—	—	—	—	—	17	—	—	—		How to Quit Smoking
"Squeeze"	2026	—	—	—	—	—	—	16	—	—	—		How to Quit Smoking
"—" denotes a recording that did not chart or was not released in that territory.

== Guest appearances ==
List of non-single guest appearances, with other performing artists, showing year released and album name
Title	Year	Other artist(s)	Album
"Elizabeth"	2016	Seno, Denzel Curry	Stories from the Back
"Aaliyah"	2016	Seno, Denzel Curry	Stories from the Back
"Mercedes"	2016	Seno, Denzel Curry	Stories from the Back
"Crystal"	2016	Seno, Denzel Curry	Stories from the Back
"Aaliyah, Pt. 2"	2016	Seno, Denzel Curry	Stories from the Back
"I'm Trying"	2019	Yeek	IDK Where
"Peach"	2019	Kevin Abstract	Arizona Baby
"Crumble"	2019	Kevin Abstract	Arizona Baby
"Stop Selling Her Drugs"	2020	Bakar	Will You Be My Yellow?
"Dominic's Interlude"	2020	Halsey	Manic
"Terms"	2021	Slowthai, Denzel Curry	Tyron
"Photo ID"	2021	Remi Wolf	Photo ID
"Die For You"	2021	Justin Bieber	Justice
"Hey Blondie"	2023	N/A	Barbie the Album
"Cameras"	2026	Isaiah Rashad	It's Been Awful
