= Batshit (disambiguation) =

Batshit most commonly refers to guano or insanity. It may also refer to:

== Songs ==
- "Batshit", a song by Sofi Tukker
- A song from Don't Forget About Me, Demos
- "Batshit!", a song from Coping Mechanism (album)
