= Babydoll (Dominic Fike song) =

2018 song by Dominic Fike

Single by Dominic Fike

from the EP Don't Forget About Me, Demos
- B-side: "White Keys"
- Released: February 27, 2026
- Recorded: c. 2016
- Genre: Alternative rock; indie rock; reggae fusion
- Length: 1:38
- Label: Columbia
- Songwriters: Dominic Fike; Julian Cruz
- Producer: Dominic Fike

Dominic Fike singles chronology
"Images of Love" (2025)	"Babydoll" (2026)	"Reputation" (2026)

Music video
- "Babydoll" on YouTube

"Babydoll" is a song by the American rapper and singer-songwriter Dominic Fike from his debut extended play Don't Forget About Me, Demos (2018). The track received widespread attention in early 2026, when it experienced a viral resurgence on online platforms such as TikTok, YouTube, and Instagram, which eventually led to it appearing on the Billboard Hot 100 chart for the first time and eventually peaking at number 10 on the chart. It was subsequently released as a single by Columbia Records on February 27, 2026, and to Italian radio by Sony Music Italy on March 27, 2026.

== Background ==
According to Dominic Fike, via Instagram, "Eight years ago I made a tape in Florida in a room a friend let me live in while I was on house arrest, I didn't think about making the songs everyday it was more like eating or something I'd do in between living. In front of me everyday was a black epiphone, my laptop and the window overlooking the parking lot to keep an eye out for my P.O. Life at this time was fairly tumultuous and I felt like a heavy burden on everyone I interacted with, especially women. I just hated being poor so much. Looking back now that time ends up meaning the most. Before algorithms before other peoples words – even hearing from people I admire. Everything that comes after only makes it harder. So don't think you're missing something to chase what you want. It's probably already there. Thankful for everyone on this journey. Everyone listening to old songs and new. This one has only gotten more special to me". "Babydoll" was originally released in October 2018 as the third track on Fike's breakout EP Don't Forget About Me, Demos. The song was initially not promoted as a single.

== Viral resurgence and reception ==
In early 2026, "Babydoll" gained widespread online attention after becoming a popular sound in the social media site TikTok, contributing to an increase in streams and chart activity long after its original release. "Babydoll" was also re-released on Spotify and other digital platforms alongside the track "White Keys", giving both tracks an increase in streaming presence and helping both tracks chart on the Billboard Hot 100. It has also since peaked in the top two on the Billboard Global 200 and reached streaming numbers upwards of 40,000,000.

== Charts ==
=== Weekly charts ===
Weekly chart performance
Chart (2023–2026)	Peak position
Argentina Hot 100 (Billboard)	49
Australia (ARIA)	62
Austria (Ö3 Austria Top 40)	1
Belgium (Ultratop 50 Wallonia)	47
Brazil Hot 100 (Billboard)	38
Canada Hot 100 (Billboard)	10
Canada CHR/Top 40 (Billboard)	2
Canada Hot AC (Billboard)	22
Canada Mainstream Rock (Billboard Canada)	35
Canada Modern Rock (Billboard Canada)	21
CIS Airplay (TopHit)	25
Croatia (Billboard)	14
Czech Republic Singles Digital (ČNS IFPI)	1
Denmark (Tracklisten)	20
Finland (Suomen virallinen lista)	30
France (SNEP)	22
Germany (GfK)	2
Global 200 (Billboard)	2
Greece International (IFPI)	4
Hungary (Single Top 40)	15
Iceland (Billboard)	17
India International (IMI)	2
Ireland (IRMA)	6
Israel (Mako Hitlist)	37
Italy (FIMI)	34
Latvia Streaming (LaIPA)	1
Lithuania (AGATA)	2
Luxembourg (Billboard)	7
Middle East and North Africa (IFPI)	7
Netherlands (Dutch Top 40)	22
Netherlands (Single Top 100)	7
Netherlands (Global Top 40)	2
New Zealand (Billboard)	11
New Zealand Catalogue Singles (RMNZ)	1
New Zealand Airplay (RCS)	22
Norway (VG-lista)	4
Panama Streaming (PRODUCE)	102
Philippines Hot 100 (Billboard Philippines)	34
Poland Streaming (OLiS)	7
Portugal (AFP)	13
Romania (Billboard)	9
Russia Airplay (TopHit)	22
Russia Streaming (TopHit)	41
Saudi Arabia (IFPI)	12
Singapore (RIAS)	16
Slovakia Singles Digital (ČNS IFPI)	1
Spain (Promusicae)	72
Sweden (Sverigetopplistan)	10
Switzerland (Schweizer Hitparade)	1
Turkey International Airplay (Radiomonitor Türkiye)	6
Ukraine Airplay (TopHit)	159
United Arab Emirates (IFPI)	10
UK Singles (Official Charts)	5
US Billboard Hot 100	10
US Adult Contemporary (Billboard)	24
US Adult Pop Airplay (Billboard)	4
US Hot Rock & Alternative Songs (Billboard)	2
US Pop Airplay (Billboard)	1
US Rock & Alternative Airplay (Billboard)	4

=== Monthly charts ===
Monthly chart performance
Chart (2026)	Peak position
Brazil Streaming (Pro-Música Brasil)	49
CIS Airplay (TopHit)	32
Russia Airplay (TopHit)	29
Russia Streaming (TopHit)	42

== Certifications ==
Region	Certification	Certified units/sales
Australia (ARIA)	6× Platinum	420,000^{‡}
Canada (Music Canada)	Platinum	80,000^{‡}
Denmark (IFPI Danmark)	Platinum	90,000^{‡}
France (SNEP)	Diamond	333,333^{‡}
Germany (BVMI)	Gold	300,000^{‡}
Hungary (MAHASZ)	4× Platinum	16,000^{‡}
Italy (FIMI)	Gold	100,000^{‡}
Netherlands (NVPI)	Platinum	93,000^{‡}
New Zealand (RMNZ)	5× Platinum	150,000^{‡}
Poland (ZPAV)	Platinum	125,000^{‡}
Portugal (AFP)	Platinum	25,000^{‡}
South Africa (RISA)	Platinum	40,000^{‡}
Spain (Promusicae)	Gold	50,000^{‡}
United Kingdom (BPI)	2× Platinum	1,200,000^{‡}
United States (RIAA)	4× Platinum	4,000,000^{‡}
Streaming
Greece (IFPI Greece)	Platinum	2,000,000^{†}
^{‡} Sales+streaming figures based on certification alone.^{†} Streaming-only figures based on certification alone.

== Release history ==
Release dates and formats
Region	Date	Format	Label	Ref.
Various	February 27, 2026	Download; streaming	Columbia	
United States	March 3, 2026	Contemporary hit radio	Columbia	
Italy	March 27, 2026	Radio airplay	Sony	
