= Hummingbird (Metro Boomin and James Blake song) =

2023 song by Metro Boomin and James Blake

Song by Metro Boomin and James Blake

from the album Metro Boomin Presents Spider-Man: Across the Spider-Verse (Soundtrack from & Inspired by the Motion Picture)
- Released: June 2, 2023
- Recorded: 2021–2023
- Genre: Alternative hip hop; R&B
- Length: 5:20
- Label: Boominati; Republic
- Songwriters: Leland Wayne; James Litherland; Andre Proctor; Dominic Maker; Billy Rose; David Lee
- Producers: Metro Boomin; Blake; Dre Moon; Maker

"Hummingbird" is a song by American record producer Metro Boomin and English musician James Blake. The song was written and produced alongside Dre Moon and Dom Maker, with additional credits going to Billy Rose and David Lee for the sampling of "Tonight You Belong to Me" by Patience and Prudence. It was released through Boominati Worldwide and Republic Records as the fifth track from Metro's first soundtrack album, which was for the film Spider-Man: Across the Spider-Verse.

== Composition and lyrics ==
"Hummingbird" features a sample of Patience and Prudence's 1956 song "Tonight You Belong to Me", which is initially pitched up, but then pitches down and fades into a smooth drum composition. James Blake merges themes of the movie and song together as he sings about a complicated and fleeting love, but one that's hard to let go of. In the movie, Miles is faced with the challenge of saying bye to Gwen as she has to return to her own universe. He displayed strong feelings for her, but her feelings for him are unclear and the relationship doesn't have the chance to develop before she has to leave. The chorus goes "And hummingbird / I know that's our time (That's our time) / But stay on / Stay on, stay on with me" These lyrics could represent Miles feelings in the film; he knows she has to leave, but wants to hold on a bit longer. He then goes on to say "And hummingbird / I can never unsee / what you've shown me". She has left such an impact on him that his life and how he sees the world will never be the same. Besides for the deeper references to the feelings and emotions of the character, there's also an allusion to the Spider-Man side of Miles Morales seen in the line, "Hangin' in the balance".

== Background ==
The song was first previewed via Sony Pictures Animation's social media accounts on May 15, 2023. It was then officially released with the rest of the Spider-Verse soundtrack album along with the premiere of the movie on June 2, 2023.

== Charts ==
Chart performance for "Hummingbird"
Chart (2023)	Peak position
Canada Hot 100 (Billboard)	73
Global 200 (Billboard)	143
US Billboard Hot 100	90
