= Provoker (band) =

American rock band

- Origin: San Francisco Bay Area, California
- Genre: Post-punk
- Years active: 2015–present
- Label: YEAR0001
- Members: Christian Crow Petty; Jonathon Lopez; Wil Palacios
- Past members: Kristian Moreno
- Website: https://provoker.zone/

Provoker are an American post-punk band from The San Francisco Bay Area formed in 2015. The band are based in Los Angeles and consist of Jonathon Lopez (guitar), Will Palacios (bass guitar), and Christian Crow Petty (vocals). The band's influences come from post-punk, synthwave and R&B.

== History ==
Formed by Jonathon Lopez in 2015, Provoker began as a solo project, focused on creating scores for fictional horror films. Lopez met singer-songwriter Christian Crow Petty at a screening of the American black comedy The Greasy Strangler, and he sent Petty soundtrack pieces to record vocals over. The two began working together and combined their musical styles between Lopez synth experimental style and Petty's R&B vocal style. Bassist Will Palacios joined the band and they released their debut EP Dark Angel in 2018.

The band's first studio album Body Jumper was released on August 13, 2021 via the Swedish independent record label YEAR0001. Pitchfork gave the album a score of 7.0 and said "[...] Once you’ve waded through the muck of familiar gaming buzzwords and imagery, you’ll find Petty’s songwriting cleverly taking aim at despair and self-flagellation through bodies with infinite lives."

Their second album Demon Compass was released on October 13, 2023. A Deluxe version of this album was released on October 11, 2024.

During 2024, Provoker toured North America and festivals including Sound & Fury, Viva PHX and Substance Fest.

Provoker's third album Mausoleum was on May 9, 2025. For this album, the band collobarated with producers including Kenny Beats, and the album is inspired by Petty's childhood and the spirituality of his parents. Soundsphere wrote that in Mausoleum Petty and Lopez "[...] once again excel as songwriters with haunting and lurid characters and settings that are developed for these tracks". Alternative Press wrote "between distorted, gut-wrenching basslines and the ghostly crackle of synths that enshroud goth-pop hooks, the project sees the band further broadening their sound and scope with tighter, shinier production, and taking a few steps from overt supernatural themes".

== Discography ==
=== Albums ===
- Body Jumper (2021, YEAR0001)
- Demon Compass (2023, YEAR0001)
- Mausoleum (2025, YEAR0001)

=== Extended plays ===
- Dark Angel (2018, Life Sucker Productions)

=== Soundtracks ===
- Sneak Peek! (Mercy Stroke OST) (2015, Self-Released)
- Dry City Maniac OST (2017, Smoking Room)

=== Singles ===
- "Dark Angel" (2018, Life Sucker Productions)
- "Since Then" (2020, Life Sucker Productions)
- "Spell Strike" (2021, YEAR0001)
- "Bugs & Humans" (2021, YEAR0001)
- "Rose In A Glass" (2021, YEAR0001)
- "Blue Sheen" (2021, YEAR0001)
- "Debt Collector" (2023, YEAR0001)
- "Valley Ghoul" (2023, YEAR0001)
- "It's In My Head" (2023, YEAR0001)
