= Nadia Tehran =

Iranian-Swedish rapper and singer

- Born: 28 April 1990 (age 36); Jönköping, Sweden
- Genres: Hip hop; electronic; experimental
- Occupations: Rapper; singer
- Years active: 2016–present
- Label: YEAR0001

Nadia Kardar Tehran (born 28 April 1990) is a Swedish rapper and singer of Iranian descent. Known for her aggressive, experimental and often political songwriting, she has received international acclaim for her recorded works and live performances.

== Artistry ==
Tehran's music draws from a number of different sources, including hip hop, punk, experimental electronic, and traditional Persian music. This melange of influences is also visible in her stage show and artwork, where traditional Persian themes, dress, and artistic techniques are combined with modern and transgressive ones.

== Personal life ==
As a teenager Tehran played in several punk bands to rebel against the conservative social climate of her home town.

While filming the music video for her song "Refugee" with her father in Iran, Tehran was arrested and searched by the police. She has not returned to Iran since.

== Discography ==
=== Albums ===
- Dozakh: All Lover's Hell (2019)

All tracks are written by Nadia Tehran.

No.	Title	Producer(s)	Length
1.	"Dozakh"	DJ Haydn, Nadia Tehran	3:39
2.	"Down"	DJ Haydn, Nadia Tehran	3:52
3.	"Something New, Nadia Tehran"	DJ Haydn, Nadia Tehran	3:01
4.	"Alcoholic Waves"	DJ Haydn, Nadia Tehran	3:22
5.	"Sail On"	DJ Haydn, Nadia Tehran	1:26
6.	"Come & Go"	DJ Haydn, Nadia Tehran	3:37
7.	"High"	DJ Haydn, Nadia Tehran	4:00
8.	"Jet"	Misogi, Woesum, Suicideyear	2:41
9.	"Tell Nobody"	Sega Bodega	3:40
10.	"AFA Poem"	DJ Haydn, Nadia Tehran	1:14
11.	"Nazi Killer"	DJ Haydn, Nadia Tehran	2:56
12.	"What About Me"	DJ Haydn, Nadia Tehran	4:08
13.	"Oops"	DJ Haydn, Nadia Tehran	3:08
14.	"Dreamers"	DJ Haydn, Nadia Tehran	3:31
15.	"In Tune with the Moon"	DJ Haydn, Nadia Tehran	4:02
Total length:			48:00

=== Extended plays ===
- Life Is Cheap, Death Is Free (2016)

All tracks are written by Nadia Tehran.

No.	Title	Producer(s)	Length
1.	"Refugee"	Nadia Tehran, Duvchi	3:05
2.	"Cash Flow"	Nadia Tehran, Frans Novotny, Martin Forslund & Gud	3:48
3.	"Rather This"	Nadia Tehran, Tim Söderström & Gud	3:18
4.	"I See You"	Nadia Tehran, Johen Tilli & Gud	3:01
5.	"Superstars"	Nadia Tehran & Patrick Alvarsson	3:59
Total length:			17:00
