= Misses (song) =

Song by Dominic Fike

from the EP 14 Minutes
- Released: April 24, 2024
- Genre: indie pop; indie rock
- Length: 1:15
- Label: Columbia
- Songwriter: Dominic Fike
- Producer: Fike

"Misses" (stylized in all lowercase) is a song by American musician Dominic Fike, released on April 24, 2024, through Columbia Records. He wrote and produced it himself, and it is included on his second EP, 14 Minutes.

== Composition and lyrics ==
"Misses" is the sixth track of Fike's EP, 14 Minutes. In the lyrics of the song, he reminisces about a past relationship he had, singing about how he truly loved their relationship and that he did and will grieve the loss of their love. He also states how he won't be blamed for their break up because throughout it all he truly loved her and wanted the best for her.

== Charts ==
Chart performance for "misses"
Chart (2024)	Peak position
Australia (ARIA)	36
Canada Hot 100 (Billboard)	71
Global 200 (Billboard)	196
Ireland (IRMA)	23
New Zealand (Recorded Music NZ)	15
UK Singles (OCC)	34
US Billboard Hot 100	99
US Hot Rock & Alternative Songs (Billboard)	15

== Certifications ==
Certifications for "misses"
Region	Certification	Certified units/sales
New Zealand (RMNZ)	Gold	15,000^{‡}
United Kingdom (BPI)	Silver	200,000^{‡}
United States (RIAA)	Platinum	1,000,000^{‡}
^{‡} Sales+streaming figures based on certification alone.
