= Dancing in the Courthouse =

Single by Dominic Fike

from the album Sunburn
- Released: April 14, 2023
- Recorded: 2022
- Genre: Alternative rock
- Length: 2:37
- Label: Columbia
- Songwriters: Dominic David Fike; Kid Harpoon; Jeff Gitty; Kenneth Charles Blume III
- Producer: Kid Harpoon

Dominic Fike singles chronology
"Elliot's Song" (2022)	"Dancing in the Courthouse" (2023)	"Ant Pile" (2023)

Music video
- "Dancing in the Courthouse" on YouTube

"Dancing in the Courthouse" is a song by American singer-songwriter Dominic Fike. It was released as a single on April 14, 2023, and is about Fike and his life growing up in Naples, Florida. It also mentions his troubles with law enforcement, and his life growing up with in the city while being "tongue-in-cheek" about the subject matter. The song also discusses reception of his debut album, What Could Possibly Go Wrong. The song was produced by Kenny Beats and received a 7/10 rating from Intersect Magazine. Additional songwriters were Kid Harpoon, Jeff Gitty, and Kenneth Charles Blume III.

He performed the song as a debut during the first weekend of Coachella along with another song he created titled "Mama's Boy".

== Music video ==
The music video was directed by Jack Begert and was created by Psycho Films. and was released on Fike's YouTube channel April 13, 2023. It was produced by Axi Mines and Michelle Mansoor, with Eric Hersey and Paige Masonek as co-producers. According to a press release by Sony Music, he mentions his songwriting talent and success on social media platforms. He also discusses his own EP, Don't Forget About Me, Demos.

=== Synopsis ===
The video shows Fike standing near places that reflect his life growing up in Florida from playing with his friends, his family and their dysfunction, his run-ins with local law enforcement due to his rowdy behavior, and people he knew. He reflects the lyrics with each moment in the video by standing in that corresponding area. At one point, inside a pool he wears a big metal "Smile" text on his belt.

== Charts ==
Chart performance for "Dancing in the Courthouse"
Chart (2023)	Peak position
New Zealand Hot Singles (RMNZ)	13
US Hot Rock & Alternative Songs (Billboard)	20
