= 777 (Key! and Kenny Beats album) =

2018 album by Key! and Kenny Beats

Studio album by Key! and Kenny Beats
- Released: May 4, 2018
- Recorded: November 2017 – 2018
- Studio: The Cave (Burbank, California)
- Genre: Trap
- Length: 34:39
- Label: Hello!/D.O.T.S.
- Producer: Kenny Beats

Key! chronology
Been Had Boyz (2017)	777 (2018)	777 Deluxe (2018)

Kenny Beats chronology
South Dark (2017)	777 (2018)	2 Minute Drills (2018)

777 (or 777 Volume 1) is a collaborative album between American rapper Key! and record producer Kenny Beats, released on May 4, 2018. Its lead single was "Hater".

Music videos were released for "Boss", "Dig It", "Hater", and "Kelly Price Freestyle".

The album was followed up in November 2018 with Key! and Kenny Beats' EP 777 Deluxe. It featured a new version of "Hater" with a guest appearance from Skepta, as well as a music video and 6lack feature for "Love on Ice".

== Background ==
Key! and Kenny Beats first met at a recording studio in Hollywood. After being impressed by Kenny Beats' production on Lil Wop's Wopavelli 3 and Hoodrich Pablo Juan's South Dark, Key! pushed the idea of a collaborative album between the two. Originally scheduled to have seven tracks (hence the title), they ended with over sixty songs by the end of their recording sessions, which would be dialed back to the final fifteen.

The album's recording took place at Kenny Beats' Burbank studio, nicknamed "The Cave", between November 2017 and early 2018. Preceding the album was Key! and Kenny Beats' single "Ice Scream Hello!" in January 2018, which was intended to be on the album but was instead released for free over concerns about its Björk sample.

== Critical reception ==
Nazuk Kochhar, writing for The Fader, praised 777 as an "undeniably great album that hits from top to bottom". Mehan Jayasuriya of Pitchfork called 777 a "breezy, streamlined record that places Key!'s easygoing personality front-and-center".

== Track listing ==
Track titles and length adapted from Spotify.

No.	Title	Length
1.	"Demolition 1 + 2"	2:37
2.	"Hater"	2:06
3.	"Blurry"	2:08
4.	"Boss"	2:01
5.	"Move"	2:07
6.	"Famous"	2:21
7.	"It Gets Better"	2:40
8.	"Kelly Price Freestyle"	2:14
9.	"Love on Ice"	2:10
10.	"Dig It"	2:59
11.	"Toronto"	2:33
12.	"True Love Interlude"	1:59
13.	"Control"	2:40
14.	"Twisted"	2:18
15.	"Squeamish"	1:41
Total length:		34:39
