= Tyron (album) =

Studio album by Slowthai
- Released: 12 February 2021
- Genres: British hip-hop; grime
- Length: 35:17
- Labels: Method; Interscope; AWGE
- Producers: Slowthai; Kwes Darko; Kelvin Krash; Samo; Daniel Duke-Okeze; Dominic Maker; Kenny Beats; JD. Reid; Kiko

Slowthai chronology
| Nothing Great About Britain (2019) | Tyron (2021) | Ugly (2023) |

Singles from Tyron
- 1. "Feel Away" Released: 15 September 2020; 2. "NHS" Released: 19 November 2020; 3. "Mazza" Released: 5 January 2021; 4. "Cancelled" Released: 9 February 2021; 5. "Vex" Released: 15 February 2021; 6. "ADHD" Released: 25 February 2021

Tyron (stylised in all caps) is the second studio album by British rapper Slowthai. It was released on 12 February 2021 through Method Records.

== Background ==
In an interview with the BBC prior to the 2019 Mercury Prize, Frampton revealed that he had already planned his next two projects following his debut album Nothing Great About Britain (2019), explaining: "I've got the concepts and I've got the ideas and I've got the titles. I've even got names of songs and the messages. It's all there - I just have to go in and do the work". He further said that he would continue to focus on social commentary on future work, but would "look for other angles to explain and express things". At the event, he confirmed to NME that he had begun work on his second album, adding that it would showcase growth and "be its own entity" rather than a sequel to his debut album. In an interview with Dazed in June 2020, Frampton said that listeners could expect "two sides of Tyron as a person" on the album, "the person who got to this place and the person who is trying to be", and elaborated that it would showcase both his softer and harder sides. He further took influence from a wide array of artists including Westside Gunn, Deb Never, Jamie T and the Arctic Monkeys.

== Release ==
On 19 November 2020, Slowthai announced he was releasing his second studio album. The release would feature collaborations by ASAP Rocky, James Blake, Skepta, Dominic Fike, Denzel Curry, Mount Kimbie and Deb Never.

=== Singles ===
On 15 September 2020, Slowthai released the first single "Feel Away". The music video, directed by Oscar Hudson, features collaborations by James Blake and electronic duo Mount Kimbie. Slowthai explained the single: "This song is about the doubts we have whether it be within friendships, your partner or with our family. It’s about putting yourself in the other person’s shoes so you have a better understanding of the situation."

Slowthai released the second single "NHS" on 19 November 2020. The single is a dedication to the UK's National Health Service, with Slowthai expanding his reasoning:

"When people were clapping for the NHS, my thing was, why did it take us this long to applaud something that's been helping people, saving lives for generations, generations, generations? Helping people longer than we’ve been alive? It took a disaster to make people appreciate the NHS. Clapping, how is that helping anyone? If we really want to help, why don't we do stuff to raise their wage or make it more comfortable for the people that are going to work them 12-hour, 14-hour shifts?"

The third single "Mazza" was released on 5 January 2021, and features American rapper ASAP Rocky. "Mazza" debuted at number 94 on the UK Singles Chart. The fourth single "Cancelled" was released on 9 February 2021, and features a collaboration with Skepta. The music video pays tribute to classic horror films such as American Psycho, The Silence of the Lambs, Candyman, Nightmare on Elm Street, and The Texas Chainsaw Massacre. On 19 February 2021, the single debuted at number 39 on the UK Singles Chart. On 15 February 2021, Slowthai released the music video to "Vex". The sixth single "ADHD" was released on 25 February 2021.

== Critical reception ==
Professional ratings
Aggregate scores
| Source | Rating |
|---|---|
| AnyDecentMusic? | 7.3/10 |
| Metacritic | 78/100 |
Review scores
| Source | Rating |
| AllMusic | 4/5 stars |
| Consequence of Sound | B+ |
| The Daily Telegraph | 3/5 stars |
| The Independent | 3/5 stars |
| The Irish Times | 5/5 stars |
| NME | 5/5 stars |
| The Observer | 4/5 stars |
| Pitchfork | 7.1/10 |
| Rolling Stone | 3.5/5 stars |
| The Times | 4/5 stars |

Tyron was met with positive reviews by music critics. At Metacritic, which assigns a normalised rating out of 100 to reviews from mainstream critics, the album has an average score of 78, based on 25 reviews, indicating "generally favorable reviews".

=== Year-end rankings ===
Year-end lists
| Publication | Accolade | Rank | Ref. |
|---|---|---|---|
| NME | The 50 Best Albums of 2021 | 31 | |

== Commercial performance ==
In the UK, Tyron debuted at number 1 on the UK Albums in the week commencing 19 February 2021, and number 1 on the UK R&B Chart. In Scotland, it debuted at number 1 and number 2 in Ireland.

Worldwide, the release debuted at number 11 in Australia, number 43 in Austria, number 24 on Belgium's Flanders chart and number 72 on their Wallonia chart, number 53 in Netherland, number 23 in Germany, number 13 in New Zealand, and number 24 in Switzerland.

== Track listing ==
Disc one
| No. | Title | Writer(s) | Producer(s) | Length |
|---|---|---|---|---|
| 1. | "45 Smoke" | Tyron Frampton; Kwes Darko | Darko | 1:58 |
| 2. | "Cancelled" (with Skepta) | Frampton; Darko; Kelvin Krash; Samo Castillano; Jesse Willis; Joseph Adenuga | Darko; Krash; Samo | 2:19 |
| 3. | "Mazza" (with ASAP Rocky) | Frampton; Darko; Castillano; Rakim Mayers | Slowthai; Darko; Samo | 2:52 |
| 4. | "Vex" | Frampton; Darko; Krash; Castillano | Darko; Krash; Samo | 2:19 |
| 5. | "Wot" | Frampton; Krash; Mayers | Krash | 0:48 |
| 6. | "Dead" | Frampton; Darko | Darko | 3:00 |
| 7. | "Play with Fire" | Frampton; Darko | Darko | 2:51 |

Disc two
| No. | Title | Writer(s) | Producer(s) | Length |
|---|---|---|---|---|
| 1. | "I Tried" | Frampton; Darko; Daniel Duke-Okeze; Trey Gruber | Duke-Okeze | 2:15 |
| 2. | "Focus" | Frampton; James Blake; Dominic Maker; Kenny Beats | Maker; Kenny Beats | 2:05 |
| 3. | "Terms" (with Dominic Fike and Denzel Curry) | Frampton; Darko; Kenny Beats; JD. Reid; Dominic Fike; Denzel Curry | Maker; Kenny Beats; JD. Reid | 3:13 |
| 4. | "Push" (with Deb Never) | Frampton; Darko; Maker; Gavin Michael Clark; Michael Percy; Deb Never | Darko; Maker | 2:20 |
| 5. | "NHS" | Frampton; Darko; Krash; Castillano; Kiko | Darko; Krash; Samo; Kiko | 3:26 |
| 6. | "Feel Away" (with James Blake and Mount Kimbie) | Frampton; Maker; Blake; Dave Hall; Mariah Carey | Maker | 3:21 |
| 7. | "ADHD" | Frampton; Darko; Castillano; Kiko | Slowthai; Darko; Samo; Kiko | 2:30 |
| Total length: | | | | 35:17 |

Notes

- All track titles from disc one are stylised in all caps, while all track titles from disc two are stylised in all lowercase.
- "I Tried" contains samples of "I Tried", written and performed by Trey Gruber.

== Personnel ==
Vocals

- Slowthai – vocals
- Skepta – vocals (1.2)
- ASAP Rocky – vocals (1.3)
- Kwes Darko – vocals (1.6)
- Denzel Curry – vocals (2.3)
- Dominic Fike – vocals (2.3)
- Deb Never – vocals (2.4)
- James Blake – vocals (2.6)

Technical

- Joe LaPorta – mastering
- Michalis "MsM" Michael – mixing, programming
- Tom Archer – recording (1.1, 1.4, 2.5)
- Nick Breton – recording (2.1, 2.2)

Design

- Crowns & Owls – creative direction, photography
- Lewis Levi – creation direction
- George Smith – art direction
- Eddie Amos – set design
- Louis Simonen – set design
- Henry Hewitt – photography assistance
- Morgan Shaw – photography assistance
- Ellis Earl – production assistance

== Charts ==
Chart performance for Tyron
| Chart (2021) | Peak position |
|---|---|
| Australian Albums (ARIA) | 11 |
| Austrian Albums (Ö3 Austria) | 43 |
| Belgian Albums (Ultratop Flanders) | 24 |
| Belgian Albums (Ultratop Wallonia) | 72 |
| Dutch Albums (Album Top 100) | 53 |
| German Albums (Offizielle Top 100) | 23 |
| Irish Albums (Official Charts) | 2 |
| Lithuanian Albums (AGATA) | 24 |
| New Zealand Albums (RMNZ) | 13 |
| Scottish Albums (Official Charts) | 1 |
| Swiss Albums (Schweizer Hitparade) | 24 |
| UK Albums (Official Charts) | 1 |
| UK R&B Albums (Official Charts) | 1 |

== Certifications ==
| Region | Certification | Certified units/sales |
|---|---|---|
| United Kingdom (BPI) | Silver | 60,000^{‡} |
^{‡} Sales+streaming figures based on certification alone.
