= Mona Lisa (Dominic Fike song) =

2023 single by Dominic Fike

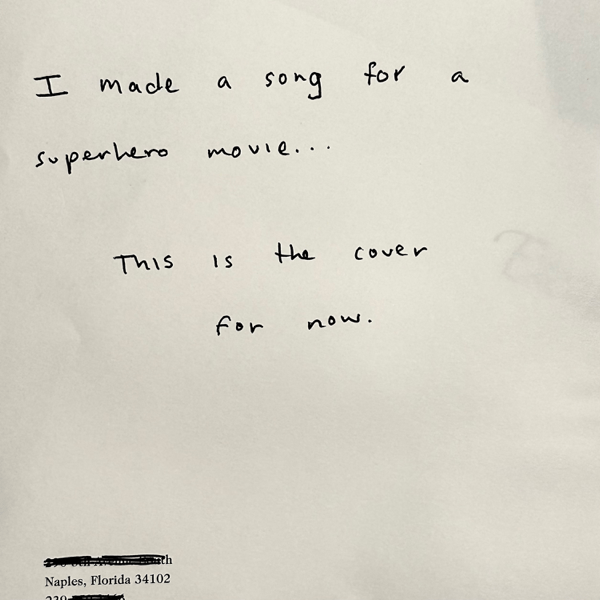

Single by Dominic Fike

from the album Sunburn
- Released: June 2, 2023
- Genre: Alternative R&B; sunshine pop
- Length: 3:06
- Label: Columbia
- Composers: Kenneth Blume III; Eliot Dubock; Mikkel S. Eriksen; Tor Erik Hermansen; William Yanez
- Lyricist: Dominic Fike
- Producers: Kenny Beats; Beat Butcha; Stargate; Willy Will Yanez

Dominic Fike singles chronology
"Ant Pile" (2023)	"Mona Lisa" (2023)	"Mama's Boy" (2023)

"Mona Lisa" is a song by American singer-songwriter Dominic Fike. It was released as a single through Columbia Records on June 2, 2023. Fike wrote the song with producers Kenny Beats, Beat Butcha, Stargate (Mikkel S. Eriksen and Tor Erik Hermansen), and Willy Will Yanez. The song was set to be a part of American record producer Metro Boomin's soundtrack album for the film Spider-Man: Across the Spider-Verse, and was originally included on its deluxe edition, which was released three days after the movie and the standard edition, but it was later removed. After changes were made, the track is now included on some versions of Fike's second album, Sunburn.

== Composition and lyrics ==
"Mona Lisa" starts with Fike singing softly over acoustic guitar before the instrumental picks up and he gets into a soft rhythm as he sings: "Love is when you try to place it out your mind, but you can't turn a radio down, and you can't think of anyone else, and love is when you try to make it out alive, but you can't turn the radio down, and you can't think of anyone else," showing that it has romantic undertones. Afterwards, he launches into a faster performance, comparing the song's subject to the Mona Lisa and saying that he hears them everywhere. The chorus begins with him starting to rap faster, slowing down eventually and eventually slipping into the post-chorus. Then, he goes back to the pace of Verse 1, talking about how the songs subject was told not to date musicians and how he knows that the subject doesn't follow the rules. Then, the chorus begins again, followed by the first lyrics of the song ("Love is when you try to place it out your mind, but you can't turn a radio down, and you can't think of anyone else, and love is when you try to make it out alive, but you can't turn the radio down, and you can't think of anyone else"). Then, he repeats the post-chorus, and the song ends after a short instrumental.

== Charts ==
Weekly chart performance for "Mona Lisa"
Chart (2023–24)	Peak position
Australia (ARIA)	92
Canada Hot 100 (Billboard)	62
Ireland (IRMA)	58
New Zealand Hot Singles (RMNZ)	31
San Marino (SMRRTV Top 50)	36
UK Singles (OCC)	66
US Billboard Hot 100	89
US Adult Pop Airplay (Billboard)	21
US Hot Rock & Alternative Songs (Billboard)	6
US Pop Airplay (Billboard)	15

=== Year-end charts ===
Year-end chart performance for "Mona Lisa"
Chart (2023)	Position
US Hot Rock & Alternative Songs (Billboard)	22

== Certifications ==
Certifications for "Mona Lisa"
Region	Certification	Certified units/sales
New Zealand (RMNZ)	Gold	15,000^{‡}
United Kingdom (BPI)	Silver	200,000^{‡}
United States (RIAA)	Gold	500,000^{‡}
^{‡} Sales+streaming figures based on certification alone.

== Release history ==
Release history for "Mona Lisa"
Region	Date	Format	Label
Various	June 2, 2023	Digital download; streaming	Columbia
United States	June 19, 2023	Hot adult contemporary radio	Columbia
United States	June 20, 2023	Contemporary hit radio	Columbia
