= Sunburn (Dominic Fike album) =

- Digital and standard edition cover. Alternative cover features a B&W portrait of Fike staring at the sun and covering his eyes.

Studio album by Dominic Fike
- Released: July 7, 2023
- Genre: Pop rock
- Length: 39:13
- Label: Columbia
- Producers: Beat Butcha; Julian Cruz; Dominic Fike; Kenny Beats; Kid Harpoon; Sam Homaee; Henry Kwapis; Ariel Rechtshaid; Jim-E Stack; StarGate; Michael Uzowuru; Devin Workman; Willy Will Yanez

Dominic Fike chronology
What Could Possibly Go Wrong (2020)	Sunburn (2023)	14 Minutes (2024)

Singles from Sunburn
- 1. "Dancing in the Courthouse" Released: April 14, 2023; 2. "Ant Pile" Released: May 26, 2023; 3. "Mona Lisa" Released: June 2, 2023; 4. "Mama's Boy" Released: June 23, 2023

Sunburn is the second studio album by American singer-songwriter Dominic Fike, released through Sandy Boys and Columbia Records on July 7, 2023. The album was primarily produced by Jim-E Stack, Devin Workman, and Henry Kwapis.

Sunburn was preceded by four singles before its release: "Dancing in the Courthouse", "Ant Pile", "Mona Lisa", a track which was featured in the 2023 American superhero film Spider-Man: Across the Spider-Verse, and "Mama's Boy". It received positive reviews from critics and debuted at number 30 on the US Billboard 200 and number 56 on the UK Albums Chart. To support the album, Fike embarked on the Don't Stare at the Sun World Tour.

== Background ==
"I'm trying to drop ASAP and load the world with a bunch of music. I've been making a bunch of stuff, and I want it to come out. So that's what we’re gonna do."

— Dominic Fike when asked if he would follow up his debut swiftly

A press release described the album as consisting exploration of songs having themes of "heartbreak, regret, addiction, sex, and jealousy." It emphasizes that it doesn't aim to present grand declarations from a superstar, but rather offers the raw and vulnerable revelations of a young artist who is still evolving and striving to make a strong impression. Fike called the album "very honest" and stated he "think[s] the world is missing honesty". According to Jim-E Stack, the principal producer on the album, the goal was to "let the world know who Dom is".

In a July 2020 NME cover story, Fike revealed his plans on releasing a second album in 2020, stating that he was "making multiple songs a day for what won’t be another guitar-based record".

== Release and promotion ==
The album's title was officially confirmed on May 12, 2023, with the official cover art being revealed on May 24, 2023.

"Dancing in the Courthouse" was released on April 14, 2023, as the lead single for the album, "Ant Pile", the second single for the album was released on May 26, 2023, "Mona Lisa" was the third single of the album, it was featured in the 2023 American superhero film Spider-Man: Across the Spider-Verse, its fourth single "Mama's Boy" was released on June 23, 2023.

A concert tour in support of the album, the Don't Stare at the Sun Tour, was announced alongside the release of "Ant Pile". The tour consists of over 28 shows, beginning at TCU Amphitheatre in White River State, Indianapolis on July 13, 2023, and concluding at Iroquois Amphitheatre in Louisville on August 30, 2023. Fike also announced a second leg of the tour, taking place in the UK; the tour started in Glasgow on September 19, 2023, and saw Fike perform in Manchester, Birmingham, and London.

== Critical reception ==
Professional ratings
Aggregate scores
Source	Rating
Metacritic	76/100
Review scores
Source	Rating
AllMusic	3.5/5 stars
Clash	8/10
The Line of Best Fit	9/10
NME	3/5 stars
Spectrum Culture	5/10

According to the review aggregator Metacritic, Sunburn received "generally favorable reviews" based on a weighted average score of 76 out of 100 from four critic scores. The Line of Best Fit's Lana Williams described Sunburn as "endearing and introspective" as well as "a quick-stop tour of his history in his most personal project to date". Williams concluded that it is a "delightful entanglement of love, introspection, and nostalgia" and wrote that "Fike has demonstrated that he can succinctly slot into any category". Erica Campbell of NME called the album a "hypnotic memoir" and found that "it's not just the chaotic liberation of the Sunshine State the [15] tracks revel in, it's the heartbreak, addiction and disarray that trailed behind his time there". Clash's James Mellen summarized Sunburn as "hazy, breezy, with many moments feeling like a homage to California, whether it be 2000s pop influence or West Coast pop-punk reference points. The record is also brief; ten tracks, each one the right length", and remarked that "there's no filler here".

== Commercial performance ==
Sunburn debuted at number 30 on the US Billboard 200, including number 4 on the Top Rock & Alternative Albums chart. The album also debuted at number 28 on the Canadian Albums Chart.

The album debuted at number 56 on the UK Albums Chart, making it Fike's first entry in the country's album chart. It also debuted at 57 on the Scottish Albums chart.

The album debuted at number 25 in Australia on the ARIA Albums Chart.

== Track listing ==
Sunburn track listing
No.	Title	Writer(s)	Producer(s)	Length
1.	"How Much Is Weed?"	Dominic Fike; Jim-E Stack	Fike; Ariel Rechtshaid; Jim-E Stack	2:05
2.	"Ant Pile"	Fike; Julian Cruz; Henry Kwapis; Stack; Devin Workman	Fike; Cruz; Kwapis; Stack; Workman	2:06
3.	"Think Fast" (featuring Weezer)	Fike; Rivers Cuomo; Workman	Fike; Workman	3:42
4.	"Sick"	Fike; Kwapis; Stack; Workman	Fike; Kwapis; Stack; Workman; Capi^{[a]}	2:21
5.	"7 Hours"	Fike; Kwapis; Stack; Workman	Fike; Kwapis; Stack; Workman	2:48
6.	"Dancing in the Courthouse"	Fike; Kenneth Blume III; Jeff Gitelman; Kid Harpoon	Kid Harpoon	2:37
7.	"Mona Lisa"	Fike; Blume; Eliot Dubock; Mikkel S. Eriksen; Tor Erik Hermansen; William Yanez	Beat Butcha; Kenny Beats; StarGate; Willy Will Yanez	3:06
8.	"Bodies"	Fike; Sam Homaee; Kwapis; Stack; Workman	Fike; Kwapis; Stack; Workman; Homaee^{[c]}	2:04
9.	"Sunburn"	Fike; Stack	Fike; Kwapis; Stack; Workman	2:59
10.	"Pasture Child"	Fike; Workman	Fike; Stack; Workman	2:53
11.	"4x4"	Fike; Stack	Fike; Kwapis; Stack; Workman; Michael Uzowuru	2:47
12.	"Frisky"	Fike; Flea; John Frusciante; Anthony Kiedis; Kwapis; Chad Smith; Stack; Workman	Fike; Kwapis; Stack; Workman	1:55
13.	"Mama's Boy"	Fike; Homaee; Kwapis; Stack; Workman	Fike; Homaee; Kwapis; Stack; Workman	2:35
14.	"Dark"	Fike; Cruz	Fike; Cruz; Stack; Workman	2:56
15.	"What Kinda Woman"	Fike; Homaee	Fike; Homaee	2:14
Total length:				39:13

=== Notes ===
- ^{^[c]} signifies a co-producer.
- ^{^[a]} signifies an additional producer.
- "Mona Lisa", a song originally set to feature on the deluxe version of the Spider-Man: Across the Spider-Verse soundtrack album, was removed from the deluxe version of the soundtrack album and later added to Sunburn, after the album had already been made available for preorder. Because of this, some versions of Sunburn do not include the song and have 14 tracks.
- "Think Fast" interpolates "Undone – The Sweater Song" by Weezer.

== Personnel ==
Musicians

- Dominic Fike – vocals, guitar (all tracks); bass guitar (tracks 3, 5, 10), drums (4, 12), programming (4), keyboards (6, 9), percussion (11)
- Jim-E Stack – drums (1, 2, 5, 8–10, 12), keyboards (1, 2, 4, 9, 11–13), bass guitar (4), guitar (9), programming (14)
- Ariel Rechtshaid – bass guitar, drums (1)
- Henry Kwapis – drums (2, 3, 8), programming (4, 5), keyboards (8, 9, 11), percussion (9, 12)
- Julian Cruz – drums (2, 14), keyboards (14)
- Devin Workman – drums (3, 5, 8, 10, 12), keyboards (4, 5, 8, 9, 13), programming (14)
- Capi – keyboards (4)
- Anneston Pisayavong – choir (5, 8, 13)
- Christopher Davis – choir (5, 8, 13)
- Denise Stoudmire – choir (5, 8, 13)
- Phylicia Hill – choir (5, 8, 13)
- Roman Collins – choir (5, 8, 13)
- Sydney Bourne – choir (5, 8, 13)
- Eli Teplin – keyboards (5)
- Rivers Cuomo – backing vocals (3)
- Kid Harpoon – acoustic guitar, bass guitar, drums, guitar, synthesizer (6)
- Jeff Gitelman – guitar (6)
- Ivan Jackson – horn (6)
- Kenny Beats – programming (6)
- Remi Wolf – background vocals (8)
- Tommy King – keyboards (8)
- Westerns – bass guitar (9)
- Stewart Brooks – bass guitar (11, 12)
- Rahm – piano (11)
- Sam Homaee – keyboards, programming (13)

Technical

- Randy Merrill – mastering (1–6, 8–15)
- Joe LaPorta – mastering (7)
- Mark "Spike" Stent – mixing (1–6, 8–15)
- Thomas Warren – mixing (7)
- Jim-E Stack – engineering (1, 8, 9, 11)
- Ariel Rechtshaid – engineering (1)
- Devin Workman – engineering (2–4, 5, 9, 12, 13)
- Julian Cruz – engineering (2, 14)
- Dominic Fike – engineering (4, 11, 12, 14)
- Jon Sher – engineering (5, 13)
- Emi Trevena – engineering (6)
- Brian Rajaratnam – engineering (6)
- StarGate – engineering (7)
- Ian Gold – engineering (8)
- Sam Homaee – engineering (8, 13, 15)
- Andrew Keller – engineering (10)
- Matt Wolach – engineering assistance (1–6, 8–15)

== Charts ==
Chart performance for Sunburn
Chart (2023–2025)	Peak position
Australian Albums (ARIA)	25
Belgian Albums (Ultratop Flanders)	144
Canadian Albums (Billboard)	28
Greek Albums (IFPI)	90
Irish Albums (IRMA)	73
New Zealand Albums (RMNZ)	9
Scottish Albums (Official Charts)	57
UK Albums (Official Charts)	56
US Billboard 200	30
US Top Rock & Alternative Albums (Billboard)	4

== Certifications ==
Certifications and sales for Sunburn
Region	Certification	Certified units/sales
New Zealand (RMNZ)	Gold	7,500^{‡}
^{‡} Sales+streaming figures based on certification alone.

== Release history ==
Release formats and history for Sunburn
Region	Date	Format(s)	Label	Ref.
Various	July 7, 2023	Cassette; CD; vinyl	Columbia	
Various	July 7, 2023	digital download; streaming	Columbia	
