= Spider-Man: Across the Spider-Verse (soundtrack) =

2023 film soundtrack

The soundtrack for the 2023 American animated superhero film Spider-Man: Across the Spider-Verse, based on the Miles Morales incarnation of the superhero Spider-Man and produced by Sony Pictures Animation, consists of a soundtrack album curated by American record producer Metro Boomin and an original score composed by English composer Daniel Pemberton. Those of the

albums were released on June 2, 2023, in conjunction with the film's release; Metro's soundtrack was released under the title Spider-Man: Across the Spider-Verse (Soundtrack from and Inspired by the Motion Picture), stylized in all caps and referred to by its full title: Metro Boomin Presents Spider-Man: Across the Spider-Verse (Soundtrack from and Inspired by the Motion Picture) under the Boominati Worldwide and Republic Records labels and Pemberton's score was released as Spider-Man: Across the Spider-Verse (Original Score) on the Sony Classical label.

== Soundtrack ==
Metro Boomin Presents Spider-Man: Across the Spider-Verse (Soundtrack from and Inspired by the Motion Picture)

Soundtrack album by Metro Boomin
- Released: June 2, 2023
- Recorded: 2022–2023
- Genres: Hip-hop; pop; trap; R&B
- Length: 47:10
- Labels: Boominati; Republic
- Producers: Metro Boomin; Al Cres; Beam; Boumidjal; B HAM; Dom Maker; Dre Moon; Dr. Luke; Holomobb; Honorable C.N.O.T.E.; James Blake; Johan Lenox; Mike Dean; Peter Lee Johnson; Peter Fenn; Prince85; Rafael Devante; Scriptplugg; TrakGirl; xZ

Metro Boomin chronology
Heroes & Villains (2022)	Metro Boomin Presents Spider-Man: Across the Spider-Verse (Soundtrack from and Inspired by the Motion Picture) (2023)	We Don't Trust You (2024)

Singles from Spider-Man: Across the Spider-Verse (Soundtrack from and Inspired by the Motion Picture)
- 1. "Calling" Released: May 31, 2023

American record producer Metro Boomin created the original soundtrack for Spider-Man: Across the Spider-Verse, with co-production credits on 10 songs. The soundtrack also features production from notable producers such as Dr. Luke, Mike Dean, Dre Moon, Honorable C.N.O.T.E., and others. and It was released through Boominati Worldwide and Republic Records on June 2, 2023, in conjunction with the film's release.

It contains appearances from Swae Lee, Lil Wayne, Offset, ASAP Rocky, Roisee, Future, Lil Uzi Vert, JID, James Blake, Nav, A Boogie wit da Hoodie, Ei8ht, Don Toliver, Wizkid, Beam, Toian, Coi Leray, 21 Savage, 2 Chainz, and Nas. The deluxe version of the soundtrack was released three days later, on June 5, 2023. It contains additional songs performed by other artists, consisting of Mora, Becky G, Ayra Starr, Shenseea, Myke Towers, Big Boss Vette, Omah Lay, and Pop Money.

An instrumental edition of the album, titled the MetroVerse instrumental edition, which contains instrumental editions of the ten tracks that Metro co-produced, was released on August 4, 2023.

The album was supported by one single, "Calling", a collaboration alongside Swae Lee and Nav that features A Boogie wit da Hoodie and was released two days before the original version of the album. The single "Mona Lisa" by Dominic Fike was released on the same day and was originally included on the deluxe edition but was removed and later included on his second studio album, Sunburn. Though not present on the soundtrack album, the film also features the songs "Guess Who's Back" by Rakim, "Ain't No Love in the Heart of the City" by Bobby "Blue" Bland, "Light the City Up" by Cut the Lights and "On the Run" by Cerebral Ballzy. The album also includes "snatches of dialogue snipped from the film," with the film's narrative correlating with the drama featured in the lyricism of the album's tracks.

== Background and promotion ==
In December 2022, Metro announced that he was creating music for the soundtrack of Spider-Man: Across the Spider-Verse. Film screenwriters Phil Lord and Christopher Miller also confirmed that Metro would be involved with the sequel. In May 2023, Metro was announced as the soundtrack's executive producer. Later in the month, he began to announce the names of collaborators on the soundtrack by posting illustrations of the artists in Spider-Man costumes.

On May 24, he announced that Future, Don Toliver, and James Blake would appear on the soundtrack. On May 29, he announced that Nav, Coi Leray, JID, Swae Lee, Toian, and Lil Uzi Vert would also appear on the soundtrack. On May 30, he announced that Beam, Ei8ht, Offset, A Boogie wit da Hoodie, Wizkid, A$AP Rocky, 21 Savage, 2 Chainz, Roisee, Nas, and Lil Wayne would also appear on the soundtrack.

In May 2023, an advertisement for Hyundai produced in partnership with Sony previewed the song "Link Up", a collaboration alongside Don Toliver. On June 5, 2023, the deluxe version of the soundtrack was released, containing additional songs performed by other artists, consisting of Mora, Becky G, Ayra Starr, Shenseea, Myke Towers, Big Boss Vette, Omah Lay, and Pop Money. The lead single of the album, "Calling", a collaboration alongside Swae Lee and Nav that features A Boogie wit da Hoodie, was released on May 31, 2023. On June 2, 2023, American singer-songwriter Dominic Fike released the single "Mona Lisa", which originally appeared on the deluxe edition of the soundtrack, but was taken off the soundtrack album a few days later and instead included on his second studio album, Sunburn. On June 14, 2023, Lisa released "Realize", the main theme in the soundtrack for the Japanese dub release of the film.

=== Critical reception ===
Professional ratings
Review scores
Source	Rating
Pitchfork	6.4/10

The soundtrack for Spider-Man: Across the Spider-Verse received generally positive reviews from music critics. Miles Marshall Lewis of Rolling Stone called it "super apropos in the high school halls of Brooklyn Visions Academy." Severina Chu of Screen Rant praised the sequel's soundtrack, writing "From high-energy beats to slow, methodical rhythms," the film's soundtrack succeeded in both fitting in on-screen, as well as stand-alone tracks. Chu added that "the soundtrack does just as much [as the animation] to give the franchise a completely fresh and unique identity."

Billboard rated the album the 43rd best of 2023 with Heran Mamo writing that Metro Boomin "delivered a lush mix of hip-hop, pop, Latin and Afrobeats that honored the film's hero Miles Morales' African American and Puerto Rican heritage and unlocked different dimensions of Metro's artistry." Grant Rindner of Complex described the album as "polished and slick, but with a core of genuine emotion."

=== Commercial performance ===
In the United States, Metro Boomin Presents Spider-Man: Across the Spider-Verse debuted at number seven on the US Billboard 200 with 66,000 album-equivalent units, which included 3,000 pure album sales in its first week. The album marks the artist's sixth top ten album in the country. It serves as Metro Boomin's fourth album at number one on the Top R&B/Hip-Hop Albums. In its second week, the album jumped to number five, earning 54,000 album-equivalent units.

== Track listing ==
Spider-Man: Across the Spider-Verse (Soundtrack from and Inspired by the Motion Picture)
No.	Title	Writer(s)	Producer(s)	Length
1.	"Annihilate" (with Swae Lee, Lil Wayne and Offset)	Leland Wayne; Khalif Brown; Dwayne Carter, Jr.; Kiari Cephus; Jocelyn Donald; Michael Dean; Mejdi Rhars	Metro Boomin; Mike Dean; Prince85	3:51
2.	"Am I Dreaming" (with ASAP Rocky and Roisee)	Le. Wayne; Rakim Mayers; Uriel Brush; Dean; Peter Lee Johnson; Landon Wayne	Metro Boomin; Dean; Johnson; Scriptplugg	4:16
3.	"All the Way Live" (with Future and Lil Uzi Vert)	Le. Wayne; Nayvadius Wilburn; Symere Woods; Christopher Townsend; Johan Lenox	Metro Boomin; Xz; Lenox^{[b]}	4:05
4.	"Danger (Spider)" (Offset and JID)	Cephus; Destin Route; Carlton Mays, Jr.	Honorable C.N.O.T.E.	3:25
5.	"Hummingbird" (with James Blake)	Le. Wayne; James Litherland; Andre Proctor; Dominic Maker; Billy Rose; David Lee	Metro Boomin; James Blake; Dre Moon; Dom Maker	5:19
6.	"Calling" (with Swae Lee and Nav featuring A Boogie wit da Hoodie)	Le. Wayne; Brown; Navraj Goraya; Artist Dubose; Jordan Holt-May; Townsend; Lenox	Metro Boomin; Xz; Lenox^{[b]}	3:39
7.	"Silk & Cologne" (Ei8ht and Offset)	Cephus; Olivia Waithe; Rhars; Divashen Govender; Youri Krief; Ulysse Poletti	Prince85; Boumidjal; Holomobb	2:42
8.	"Link Up" (with Don Toliver and Wizkid featuring Beam and Toian)	Le. Wayne; Ayodeji Balogun; Tyshane Thompson; Toian Gichie; Almando Cresso; Jordan Douglas	Metro Boomin; Beam; Al Cres; Johnson	3:15
9.	"Self Love" (with Coi Leray)	Le. Wayne; Brittany Collins; Brittany Hazzard; Proctor; Rhars; Lenox	Metro Boomin; Dre Moon; Prince85; Lenox^{[b]}	3:09
10.	"Home" (with Don Toliver and Lil Uzi Vert)	Le. Wayne; Caleb Toliver; Woods; Townsend; Lenox	Metro Boomin; Xz; Lenox^{[b]}	3:15
11.	"Nonviolent Communication" (with James Blake, ASAP Rocky and 21 Savage)	Le. Wayne; Litherland; Mayers; Shéyaa Abraham-Joseph; Proctor; Shakari Linder	Metro Boomin; Dre Moon; TRAKGIRL	3:29
12.	"Givin' Up (Not the One)" (Don Toliver, 21 Savage and 2 Chainz)	Toliver; Abraham-Joseph; Tauheed Epps; Mays; Rafael Sinay	Honorable C.N.O.T.E.; Rafael Devante^{[a]}	3:54
13.	"Nas Morales" (with Nas)	Le. Wayne; Nasir Jones; Leslie Wilson; Melvin Wilson; Robert Jackson; Claude Moine; Pierre Papadiamandis; Dean; Rhars	Metro Boomin; Dean; Prince85	2:47
Total length:				47:10

Deluxe edition bonus tracks
No.	Title	Writer(s)	Producer(s)	Length
14.	"Ansiedades" (Mora)	Gabriel Mora; Michael Cole; Max Borghetti; Alejandro Fernández; Joseph Barrios	Cashae; Cole	2:54
15.	"Take It to the Top" (Becky G and Ayra Starr)	Oyinkansola Aderibigbe; Stephen McGregor; Jocelyn Donald; Taylor Parks; Jenny Berggren; Malin Berggren; Akil King; Oluwadamilare Aderibigbe; Ulf Ekberg; Jonas Berggren	Di Genius	2:05
16.	"Infamous" (Shenseea featuring Myke Towers)	Chinsea Linda Lee; Michael Torres; Barrington Levy; Paul Love; Chaniah Kelley; Donny Flores; Nathalia Marshall; Simon Plummer; Shae Jacobs; Mustapha M. Mbiakop; Ricardo Encarnacion	Shae Jacobs; Mustapha LeBeau; Rick Diezel	2:13
17.	"I Can't Stop" (Big Boss Vette and Omah Lay)	Diamond Smith; Stanley Didia; Lukasz Gottwald; Randall Hammers; Peter Fenn; Gamal Lewis; Rocco Valdes; Brandon Hamlin	Dr. Luke; B HAM; Fenn	2:13
18.	"Another Dimension" (Pop Money)	Marvyn Houllier; Stephen Anoumantou; William Collins; Joshua Parker; Jonathan Zibi; Kelley	OG Parker; Jon Milli; BatGangBeats; Samoney	2:59
Total length:				59:36

MetroVerse instrumental edition
No.	Title	Producer(s)	Length
1.	"Annihilate" (instrumental)	Metro Boomin; Mike Dean; Prince85	3:51
2.	"Am I Dreaming" (instrumental)	Metro Boomin; Dean; Johnson; Scriptplugg	4:16
3.	"All the Way Live" (instrumental)	Metro Boomin; Xz; Lenox^{[b]}	4:05
4.	"Hummingbird" (with James Blake) (instrumental)	Metro Boomin; James Blake; Dre Moon; Dom Maker	5:19
5.	"Calling" (instrumental)	Metro Boomin; Xz; Lenox^{[b]}	3:39
6.	"Link Up" (instrumental)	Metro Boomin; Beam; Al Cres; Johnson	3:15
7.	"Self Love" (instrumental)	Metro Boomin; Dre Moon; Prince85; Lenox^{[b]}	3:09
8.	"Home" (instrumental)	Metro Boomin; Xz; Lenox^{[b]}	3:15
9.	"Nonviolent Communication" (instrumental)	Metro Boomin; Dre Moon; TrakGirl	3:29
10.	"Nas Morales" (instrumental)	Metro Boomin; Dean; Prince85	2:47
Total length:			1:24:19

Notes

- ^{^[a]} signifies a co-producer
- ^{^[b]} signifies an additional producer
- "Pretty Girl" by Ice Spice and Rema was planned to be featured on the album; however, it was not included for unknown reasons.
- "Annihilate" is written as "Annihilate (Spider-Man: Across the Spider-Verse)" and features additional vocals from Shameik Moore and Hailee Steinfeld
- "All the Way Live" is written as "All the Way Live (Spider-Man: Across the Spider-Verse)" and features additional vocals by Shameik Moore and Brian Tyree Henry
- "Danger (Spider)" features additional vocals from Shameik Moore and Hailee Steinfeld
- "Calling" is written as "Calling (Spider-Man: Across the Spider-Verse)" and features additional vocals by Brian Tyree Henry
- "Silk & Cologne" is written as "Silk & Cologne (Spider-Verse Remix)"
- "Link Up" is written as "Link Up (Spider-Verse Remix) [Spider-Man: Across the Spider-Verse]"
- "Self Love" is written as "Self Love (Spider-Man: Across the Spider-Verse)" and features additional vocals from Shameik Moore and Hailee Steinfeld
- "Home" features additional vocals by Shameik Moore and Jason Schwartzman
- "Nonviolent Communication" features additional vocals by Oscar Isaac
- "Givin' Up (Not the One)" features additional vocals by Oscar Isaac
- "Infamous" is written as "Infamous (Spider-Verse Remix)"

Sample credits

- "Hummingbird" contains a sample from "Tonight You Belong to Me", written by Billy Rose and David Lee, as performed by Patience and Prudence.
- "Nas Morales" contains samples from "Je Ne Me Retournerai Pas", written by Claude Moine and Pierre Papadiamandis, as performed by Eddy Mitchell; and samples from "Pretty Music", written by Leslie Wilson, Melvin Wilson and Robert Jackson, as performed by New Birth.

== Charts ==
=== Weekly charts ===
Weekly chart performance for Spider-Man: Across the Spider-Verse (Soundtrack from and Inspired by the Motion Picture)
Chart (2023–2024)	Peak position
Australian Albums (ARIA)	2
Austrian Albums (Ö3 Austria)	5
Belgian Albums (Ultratop Flanders)	14
Belgian Albums (Ultratop Wallonia)	17
Canadian Albums (Billboard)	2
Czech Albums (ČNS IFPI)	12
Danish Albums (Hitlisten)	16
Dutch Albums (Album Top 100)	15
Finnish Albums (Suomen virallinen lista)	29
French Albums (SNEP)	18
German Albums (Offizielle Top 100)	19
Hungarian Albums (MAHASZ)	32
Irish Compilations (OCC)	1
Italian Albums (FIMI)	20
Japanese Digital Albums (Oricon)	15
Japanese Hot Albums (Billboard Japan)	69
Lithuanian Albums (AGATA)	5
New Zealand Albums (RMNZ)	2
Norwegian Albums (VG-lista)	3
Polish Albums (ZPAV)	18
Portuguese Albums (AFP)	158
Spanish Albums (Promusicae)	17
Swedish Albums (Sverigetopplistan)	25
Swiss Albums (Schweizer Hitparade)	6
UK Compilation Albums (Official Charts)	1
UK R&B Albums (Official Charts)	4
US Billboard 200	5
US Top R&B/Hip-Hop Albums (Billboard)	1
US Soundtrack Albums (Billboard)	1

=== Year-end charts ===
2023 year-end chart performance for Spider-Man: Across the Spider-Verse (Soundtrack from and Inspired by the Motion Picture)
Chart (2023)	Position
Australian Albums (ARIA)	84
US Billboard 200	142
US Top R&B/Hip-Hop Albums (Billboard)	43
US Soundtrack Albums (Billboard)	3

2024 year-end chart performance for Spider-Man: Across the Spider-Verse (Soundtrack from and Inspired by the Motion Picture)
Chart (2024)	Position
US Soundtrack Albums (Billboard)	6

2025 year-end chart performance for Spider-Man: Across the Spider-Verse (Soundtrack from and Inspired by the Motion Picture)
Chart (2025)	Position
US Soundtrack Albums (Billboard)	20

=== Certifications ===
Certifications for Spider-Man: Across the Spider-Verse (Soundtrack from and Inspired by the Motion Picture)
Region	Certification	Certified units/sales
France (SNEP)	Gold	50,000^{‡}
^{‡} Sales+streaming figures based on certification alone.

== Score ==
Spider-Man: Across the Spider-Verse (Original Score)

Film score by Daniel Pemberton
- Released: June 2, 2023
- Studio: Sony Music Masterworks
- Length: 107:06
- Label: Sony Classical

Daniel Pemberton chronology
Enola Holmes 2 (2022)	Spider-Man: Across the Spider-Verse (Original Score) (2023)	Ferrari (2023)

Singles from Spider-Man: Into the Spider-Verse (Original Score)
- 1. "My Name Is… Miles Morales" Released: May 30, 2023

In December 2020, Daniel Pemberton confirmed that he would return from the previous film to compose the sequel's score. He spent "two years researching and developing this score, going through ideas, coming up with concepts and throwing them out." On May 30, 2023, the lead single of the score, "My Name Is… Miles Morales", was released. The score was released through Sony Classical on June 2, 2023, in conjunction with the film's release. On August 10, 2023, an extended edition of the score was released, featuring 3 additional tracks.

In an interview with Rolling Stone, Pemberton said "[They] did a presentation of all the different art-style approaches in the movie, which was phenomenal, talking about all the different techniques, from the sort of Syd Mead-inspired concept design that 2099's world is very inspired by, to the watercolor drips of Gwen's world. For me doing the music, I'm also trying to approach each world with a different palette and a different technique and a different approach."

Pemberton's score for the sequel featured a varied soundscape, including "overdriven punk rock to electronic loops infused with Indian instruments". The score has been noted to be not easily categorized into any one genre, with Pemberton describing the score as "postmodern film music; film music that comes through a filter of the last hundred years of culture in the same way that the artwork is." The themes for Miles' world carried over from the previous film, with Pemberton explaining that "the record-scratching element that we developed in the first film was something we just expanded on for [Across the Spider-Verse].

Pemberton created distinct leitmotifs for each universe featured in the sequel, "drawing inspiration from the visually disparate styles of each dimension" to produce themes for eight different worlds in the film. Pemberton aligned the score's themes with the film's art direction which employed a "dreamy palette" for Gwen Stacy. As a result, the music accompanying Gwen and her world is influenced by 1990s and 2000s indie pop and grunge, while also featuring a "synth-y" sound. When developing the soundscape for Gwen's theme, Pemberton aimed to capture her "grace and balletic qualities," while also reflecting "her rock band background and the look of her world, which was dreamy with drippy watercolors." Ultimately, through trial and error, Pemberton crafted a "90s, indie-synth, pop band sound" for Gwen, describing it as "a floaty synth sound."

For a version of the Vulture, from an Italian Renaissance-themed alternate universe, Pemberton composed "fucked up operatic medieval music". Additionally, Spider-Punk, Pavitr Prabhakar (Spider-Man India), Miguel O'Hara (Spider-Man 2099), and the villain Spot also have their own themes. For Spider-Punk's theme, Pemberton used "feedback guitars, heavy drums and distorted bass." Meanwhile, for Spider-Man India's theme, Pemberton drew inspiration from the 1982 record Ten Ragas to a Disco Beat by Charanjit Singh. Pemberton described Spider-Man 2099's theme as having an "aggressive sort of siren," with his sound being "very electronic, techno and synthesized."

=== Track listing ===
Spider-Man: Across the Spider-Verse (Original Score)
No.	Title	Length
1.	"Across the Spider-Verse (Intro)"	2:45
2.	"Spider-Woman (Gwen Stacy)"	3:06
3.	"Vulture Meets Culture"	1:34
4.	"Spider-Man 2099 (Miguel O'Hara)"	1:02
5.	"Guggenheim Assemble"	4:36
6.	"The Right to Remain Silent"	4:13
7.	"Across the Titles"	0:33
8.	"My Name Is... Miles Morales"	3:22
9.	"Back Where It All Started"	2:57
10.	"Spot Holes 1"	1:20
11.	"To My Son"	1:42
12.	"Miles Sketchbook"	2:01
13.	"Under the Clocktower"	2:55
14.	"Rio and Miles"	4:24
15.	"Creation of The Spot"	5:02
16.	"Spider-Man India (Pavitr Prabhakar)"	2:20
17.	"Mumbattan Madness"	2:34
18.	"Spider-Punk (Hobie Brown)"	2:09
19.	"Spot Holes 2"	1:11
20.	"Indian Teamwork"	4:42
21.	"Welcome to Nueva York (Earth-928)"	1:43
22.	"Spider Society"	2:05
23.	"2099 Lab"	2:35
24.	"Peter and Mayday Parker"	1:38
25.	"Canon Event"	7:09
26.	"All Stations - Stop Spider-Man"	4:22
27.	"Hold the Baby"	1:12
28.	"Nueva York Train Chase"	5:58
29.	"The Go Home Machine"	4:56
30.	"Falling Apart"	8:23
31.	"I Beat Them All"	2:28
32.	"The Anomaly"	3:46
33.	"Five Months"	2:30
34.	"Across the Spider-Verse (Start a Band)"	3:53
Total length:		1:47:06

Spider-Man: Across the Spider-Verse (Original Score) [Extended Edition]
No.	Title	Length
35.	"Chelsea, NY, Earth-65"	2:02
36.	"Father and Son"	2:15
37.	"Triumph"	2:34
Total length:		1:53:57

=== Reception ===
The "Spider-Man 2099 (Miguel O'Hara)" theme featured in the score was popularly featured in TikTok memes centered around "canon events."

In December 2023, the score was shortlisted for Best Original Score at the 96th Academy Awards. The score was nominated for Best Original Film Score at the 2024 Ivor Novello Awards.

In April 2024, a concert tour, Spider-Man: Across the Spider-Verse Live in Concert was announced in both the United Kingdom and the United States. The world premiere took place on June 30, 2024, at the Royal Festival Hall in London, with Pemberton appearing on certain dates.

=== Charts ===
Chart performance for Spider-Man: Across the Spider-Verse (Original Score)
Chart (2023)	Peak position
Scottish Albums (Official Charts)	23
UK Soundtrack Albums (Official Charts)	5
US Top Album Sales (Billboard)	34
US Soundtrack Albums (Billboard)	8
