= Kenny Beats =

American music producer (born 1991)

Kenneth Blume
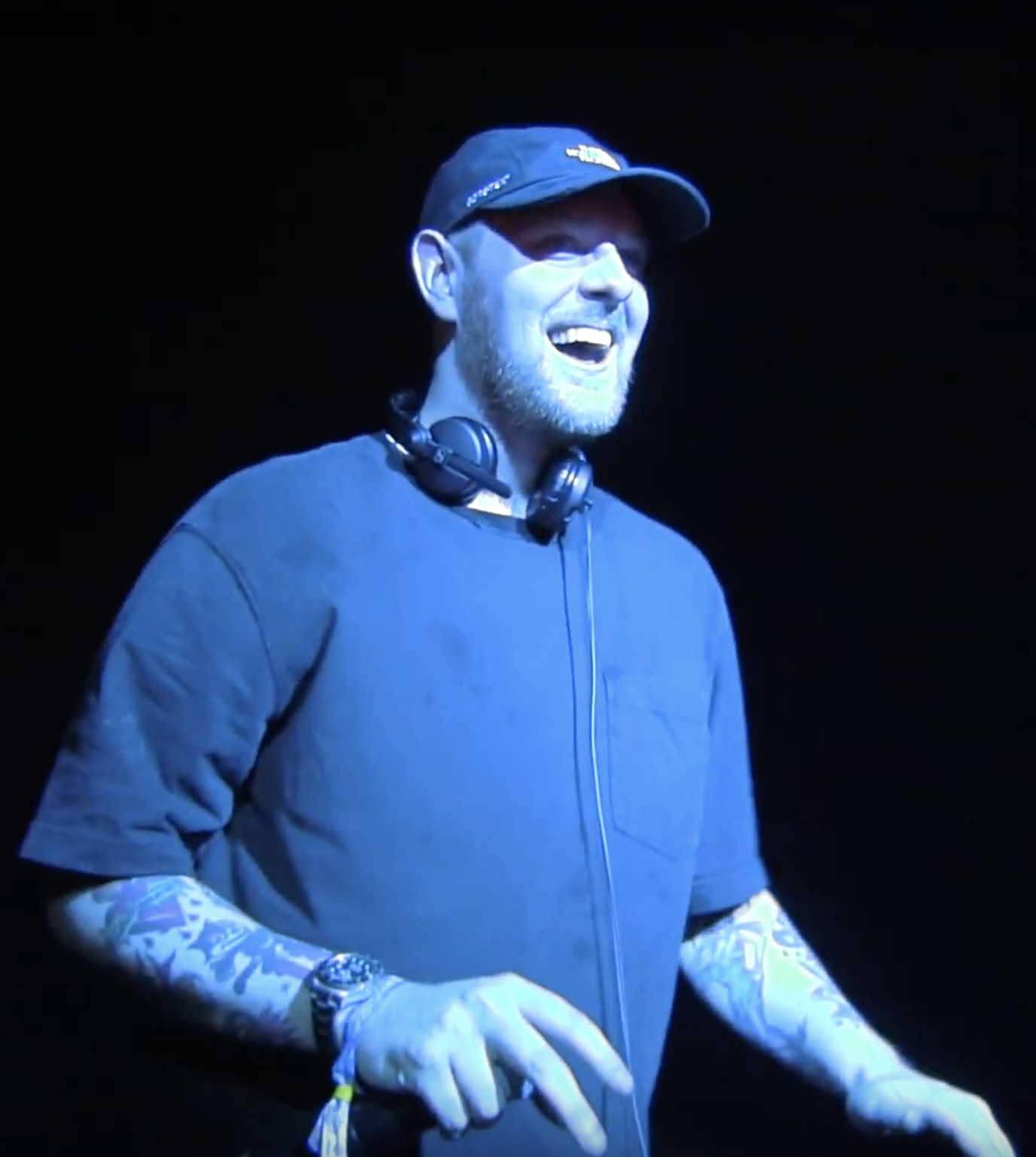
- Kenny Beats at Hard Summer 2019
- Born: Kenneth Charles Blume III
- Other name: Kenny Beats
- Occupations: Record producer; DJ; audio engineer; songwriter; sound designer
- Years active: 2010–present
- Musical career
- Genres: Hip-hop; R&B; jazz
- Instruments: Bass guitar; electric guitar; drums; piano; synthesizer
- Formerly of: Loudpvck

Kenneth Charles Blume III, formerly known professionally as Kenny Beats, is an American record producer, DJ, audio engineer, and songwriter.

== Early life ==
Kenneth Blume III was raised in Greenwich, Connecticut. His mother was a receptionist and later became a project manager; his father worked at a photo studio and a restaurant. His father purchased him a guitar and drum kit at age 7. He learned to produce music in GarageBand and Logic in an electronic music class in high school. His first guitar was a Fender Stratocaster and his first amplifier was a Fender Hot-Rod Deluxe. During his junior year at Greenwich High School, he was able to enter a national electronic-music competition hosted by the National Association for Music Education (NAFME) and the National School Boards Association (NSBA). Blume won second place in the competition, which motivated him to start taking music production seriously. He interned for RCA Records in his senior year of college.

After he graduated from high school, he moved to New York, where he started interning for Cinematic Music Group in the summer of 2010. His internship at CMG led to his collaboration with artist Smoke DZA on 4 of his albums. It was also during the year 2010 when his music attracted the attention of Levi Maestro, leading to their collaboration on an ad campaign for Brisk. He then moved to Boston and studied jazz guitar and music business at Berklee College of Music.

== Career ==
In 2009, while attending Berklee College of Music, Blume met Ryan Marks, a DJ. These two became friends, and in 2012, they decided to form the EDM duo Loudpvck. Marks ultimately left the group in 2017 while Blume transitioned from being an EDM producer to a hip-hop producer.

In March 2019, Blume launched The Cave, a YouTube series in which he invites guests to his studio to produce and record freestyles. An April 2019 episode with Zack Fox spawned resulted in "Jesus Is the One (I Got Depression)", which was officially released as a single in June 2019.

Blume released his debut album, Louie, in 2022. The album was a tribute to his father, who had been diagnosed with pancreatic cancer in 2021.

Following Louie, Blume began production of Buff, an album which followed a boy who slips into dissociative states to avoid a difficult home life. He recorded 16 songs, featuring artists including Gorillaz, Lola Young, Little Simz, and Panda Bear, before cancelling the project, deeming its fictional story as disingenuous.

== Musical style ==
Blume's production style varies. His digital audio workstation (DAW) of choice is Ableton Live. He plays piano, bass guitar, electric guitar, and drums. He often implements live instrumentation into his instrumentals, whether it be performed by himself or a fellow instrumentalist.

A lot of his productions credits often fall into the trap music sub-genre of hip-hop, commonly using 16th/8th note hi-hats with slight variation (such as rolls), hard-hitting kick drums, snares & booming 808 bass shots. He also explores more versatile instrumentation, tempos, production styles etc. such as with the likes of the more laid back and instrumental approach of songs such as singer Dominic Fike's "Phone Numbers" which contains a live guitar sample (performed by SNL lead guitarist Jared Scharff) and a more acoustic feel, backed by a Virtual Studio Technology (VST) version of a real electric bass within Ableton Live that plays the bass line, provided via the Kontakt (sampler) VST. Another style of his production leans to a more experimental sound, found within his collaborative project with rapper Denzel Curry, Unlocked which contains many spoken word samples scattered throughout the tracks and a more disjointed feel, provided by various creative implementations of obscure musical samples found throughout the project. His songs often begin with the producer tag "Whoa, Kenny!", which was originally said by the Atlanta rapper KEY!, who is a frequent collaborator of Blume's.

== Discography ==
=== Studio albums ===
Title	Album details	Peak chart positions		
Title	Album details	SCO	UK Ind.	UK R&B
Louie	Released: August 31, 2022; Label: XL; Format: CD, LP, cassette, digital download, streaming	49	10	2

=== Collaborative albums ===
Title	Album details
777 (with Key!)	Released: May 4, 2018; Label: Hello!, D.O.T.S.; Format: Digital download, streaming
2 Minute Drills (with ALLBLACK)	Released: November 16, 2018; Label: Play Runners, D.O.T.S., Empire; Format: Digital download, streaming
Anger Management (with Rico Nasty)	Released: April 25, 2019; Label: Sugar Trap; Format: Digital download, streaming
Netflix & Deal (with 03 Greedo)	Released: November 22, 2019; Label: Alamo, Sony Music Entertainment; Format: Digital download, streaming
Fathers (with Kiefer, Carrtoons and Nate Smith)	Released: July 10, 2026; Label: Blue Note; Format: Digital download, streaming
II (with Denzel Curry)	Released: August 21, 2026; Label: PH, Loma Vista; Format: CD, LP, digital download, streaming

=== Soundtrack albums ===
Title	Album details
Lurker (Original Motion Picture Soundtrack)	Released: August 22, 2025; Label: Milan; Format: Digital download, streaming

=== Extended plays ===
Title	EP details	Peak chart positions				
Title	EP details	US	AUS	CAN	IRE	NZ
Unlocked (with Denzel Curry)	Released: February 7, 2020; Label: PH, Loma Vista; Format: CD, LP, cassette, digital download, streaming	100	33	82	87	38
Unlocked 1.5 (with Denzel Curry)	Released: March 5, 2021; Label: PH, Loma Vista; Format: CD, LP, cassette, digital download, streaming	–	–	–	–	–

== Production discography ==
Year	Artist	Album	Song	Ref.
2010	Smoke DZA	Substance Abuse 1.5: The Headstash	"Headstash" (featuring Den10)	
2010	Smoke DZA	George Kush Da Button	"Continental Kush Breakfast" (featuring Den10)	
2011	Smoke DZA	The Hustler's Catalog	"Profit" (produced with 183rd)	
2011	Smoke DZA	Rolling Stoned	"Ball Game" (featuring Kendrick Lamar) (produced with 183rd)	
2011	Smoke DZA	Rolling Stoned	"Pow Wow" (featuring Dom Kennedy) (produced with 183rd)	
2011	Smoke DZA	Sweet Baby Kushed God	"Smokey Klause" (produced with 183rd)	
2011	Skeme	Before My Next Statement	"Truth"	
2012	ScHoolboy Q	Non-album single	"Party"	
2012	Smoke DZA	K.O.N.Y	"Diamond" (featuring Ab-Soul)	
2012	Skeme	Alive & Living	"Everything on Me"	
2012	Jet Life	Jet World Order 2	"24 Hrs" (featuring Trademark Da Skydiver and Young Roddy)	
2014	Ab-Soul	These Days...	"Hunnid Stax" (featuring ScHoolboy Q)	
2016	Lucki	Son of Sam	"Double Check"	
2016	Lucki	Son of Sam	"His Only..."	
2016	Skywlkr	Joints	"3 Drugs" (featuring Kenny Beats) [produced with Skywlkr]	
2017	Lucki	Non-album single	"Live It"	
2017	Hoodrich Pablo Juan and Kenny Beats	South Dark	"Dead End"	
2017	Hoodrich Pablo Juan and Kenny Beats	South Dark	"Everyday	
2017	Hoodrich Pablo Juan and Kenny Beats	South Dark	"Ruthless" (featuring Duke)	
2017	Hoodrich Pablo Juan and Kenny Beats	South Dark	"Do This"	
2017	Hoodrich Pablo Juan and Kenny Beats	South Dark	"C Sick"	
2017	Hoodrich Pablo Juan and Kenny Beats	South Dark	"3 Point Stance"	
2017	Hoodrich Pablo Juan and Kenny Beats	South Dark	"Hood" (featuring Baby Uiie)	
2017	DJ Lucas	Non-album single	"Big Dope"	
2017	Lil Wop	Wopavelli 3	"Topgolf"	
2017	Lil Wop	Wopavelli 3	"Dope Man"	
2017	Lil Wop	Wopavelli 3	"Walking Dead"	
2017	Lil Wop	Wopavelli 3	"Friday the 13th"	
2017	Lil Wop	Wopavelli 3	"Grow Up"	
2017	Lil Wop	Wopavelli 3	"Xans" (produced with ChaseTheMoney)	
2018	YoungBoy Never Broke Again	Until Death Call My Name	"Traumatized" (produced with Judge)	
2018	Key! and Kenny Beats	777	"Demolition 1 + 2"	
2018	Key! and Kenny Beats	777	"Hater"	
2018	Key! and Kenny Beats	777	"Blurry"	
2018	Key! and Kenny Beats	777	"Boss"	
2018	Key! and Kenny Beats	777	"Move"	
2018	Key! and Kenny Beats	777	"Famous"	
2018	Key! and Kenny Beats	777	"It Gets Better"	
2018	Key! and Kenny Beats	777	"Kelly Price Freestyle"	
2018	Key! and Kenny Beats	777	"Love on Ice"	
2018	Key! and Kenny Beats	777	"Dig It"	
2018	Key! and Kenny Beats	777	"Toronto"	
2018	Key! and Kenny Beats	777	"True Love Interlude"	
2018	Key! and Kenny Beats	777	"Control'"	
2018	Key! and Kenny Beats	777	"Twisted"	
2018	Key! and Kenny Beats	777	"Squeamish"	
2018	Freddie Gibbs	Freddie	"Automatic"	
2018	Freddie Gibbs	Freddie	"Death Row" (featuring 03 Greedo) [produced with Freddie Kane]	
2018	Freddie Gibbs	Freddie	"Set Set"	
2018	Freddie Gibbs	Freddie	"Toe Tag"	
2018	Freddie Gibbs	Freddie	"FBC" (produced with A. Lau and Tony Seltzer)	
2018	Zack Fox	Non-album single	"Square Up"	
2018	Vince Staples	FM!	"Feels Like Summer"	
2018	Vince Staples	FM!	"Outside!"	
2018	Vince Staples	FM!	"Don't Get Chipped" (produced with Cubeatz)	
2018	Vince Staples	FM!	"New earlsweatshirt"	
2018	Vince Staples	FM!	"FUN!" (produced with Hagler)	
2018	Vince Staples	FM!	"No bleedin"	
2018	Vince Staples	FM!	"Brand New Tyga"	
2018	Vince Staples	FM!	"(562) 453-9382"	
2018	Vince Staples	FM!	"Tweakin" (produced with KillaGraham)	
2018	JPEGMafia and Kenny Beats	Not on Veteran!	"Puff Daddy"	
2018	10k.Caash	The Creator	"Mutumbo" (featuring Rico Nasty)	
2018	10k.Caash	The Creator	"Aloha" (featuring GUN40)	
2018	JID	DiCaprio 2	"Slick Talk" (produced with EWonder and Christo)	
2018	Ski Mask the Slump God	Stokeley	"Foot Fungus" (produced with Roofeeo)	
2018	Ski Mask the Slump God	Stokeley	"Unbothered"	
2019	Rico Nasty and Kenny Beats	Anger Management	"Cold"	
2019	Rico Nasty and Kenny Beats	Anger Management	"Cheat Code" (featuring Baauer)	
2019	Rico Nasty and Kenny Beats	Anger Management	"Hatin"	
2019	Rico Nasty and Kenny Beats	Anger Management	""Big Titties" (featuring Baauer & EARTHGANG)	
2019	Rico Nasty and Kenny Beats	Anger Management	"Nasty World (skit)"	
2019	Rico Nasty and Kenny Beats	Anger Management	"Relative"	
2019	Rico Nasty and Kenny Beats	Anger Management	"Mood" (featuring Splurge)	
2019	Rico Nasty and Kenny Beats	Anger Management	"Sell Out"	
2019	Rico Nasty and Kenny Beats	Anger Management	"Again"	
2019	Zack Fox and Kenny Beats	Non-album single	"Jesus Is the One (I Got Depression)"	
2019	Dominic Fike	Non-album single	"Phone Numbers"	
2019	Ed Sheeran	No.6 Collaborations Project	"Take Me Back to London" (featuring Stormzy) (produced with Skrillex and FRED)	
2019	Gucci Mane	Delusions of Grandeur	"Proud of You" (produced with Nils)	
2019	Gucci Mane	Delusions of Grandeur	"Us"	
2019	Rexx Life Raj	Father Figure 3: Somewhere Out There	"Moonwalk"	
2019	Yung Bans	Misunderstood	"Touch the Stars (featuring Lil TJay)"	
2019	FKA twigs	Magdalene	"Holy Terrain (feat. Future)" (produced with FKA twigs, Jack Antonoff, Skrillex, Sounwave, Lewis Roberts, and Noah Goldstein)	
2019	DaBaby	Kirk	"Toes (featuring Lil Baby & Moneybagg Yo)" (produced with Queen Sixties)	
2019	Smino	Non-album single	"Trina" (produced with Lido)	
2019	03 Greedo and Kenny Beats	Netflix and Deal	"Traffic" (produced with Captain Crunch)	
2019	03 Greedo and Kenny Beats	Netflix and Deal	"Paid in Full" (produced with Nils)	
2019	03 Greedo and Kenny Beats	Netflix and Deal	"Disco Shit" (featuring Freddie Gibbs)	
2019	03 Greedo and Kenny Beats	Netflix and Deal	"Maria" (produced with 1Mind)	
2019	03 Greedo and Kenny Beats	Netflix and Deal	"Blue People" (featuring Vince Staples)	
2019	03 Greedo and Kenny Beats	Netflix and Deal	"Beg Your Pardon" (featuring Maxo Kream)	
2019	03 Greedo and Kenny Beats	Netflix and Deal	"Honey I Shrunk The Kids"	
2019	03 Greedo and Kenny Beats	Netflix and Deal	"Brad Pitt" (produced with Nils)	
2019	03 Greedo and Kenny Beats	Netflix and Deal	"Aye Twin" (featuring Key!) (produced with Dylan Brady)	
2019	03 Greedo and Kenny Beats	Netflix and Deal	"Life"	
2019	03 Greedo and Kenny Beats	Netflix and Deal	"Payback" (featuring OhGeesy) (produced with Judge Beats)	
2019	03 Greedo and Kenny Beats	Netflix and Deal	"Soul Food" (featuring Buddy) (produced with Elijah Rawk)	
2019	03 Greedo and Kenny Beats	Netflix and Deal	"Dead Presidents"	
2020	Key Glock	Yellow Tape	"Loaded"	
2020	Denzel Curry and Kenny Beats	Unlocked	"Track 01"	
2020	Denzel Curry and Kenny Beats	Unlocked	"Take_it_Back_v2"	
2020	Denzel Curry and Kenny Beats	Unlocked	"Lay_Up.m4a"	
2020	Denzel Curry and Kenny Beats	Unlocked	"Pyro (leak 2019)"	
2020	Denzel Curry and Kenny Beats	Unlocked	"DIET_"	
2020	Denzel Curry and Kenny Beats	Unlocked	"So.Incredible.pkg"	
2020	Denzel Curry and Kenny Beats	Unlocked	"Track07"	
2020	Denzel Curry and Kenny Beats	Unlocked	"'Cosmic'.m4a"	
2020	Deb Never and Kenny Beats	Non-album single	"Stone Cold"	
2020	James Vickery	Overture	"Tear It Apart"	
2020	ICECOLDBISHOP and Kenny Beats	Non-album single	"DICKIES SUIT"	
2020	ICECOLDBISHOP and Kenny Beats	Non-album single	"TRICK DADDY"	
2020	Slowthai	Non-album single	"MAGIC"	
2020	Aitch	Polaris	"Safe to Say" (produced with Cubeatz)	
2020	IDLES	Ultra Mono	"Grounds"	
2020	Trash Talk and Kenny Beats	Squalor	"Point No Point"	
2020	Trash Talk and Kenny Beats	Squalor	"Something Wicked"	
2020	Trash Talk and Kenny Beats	Squalor	"Worst of Times"	
2020	Trash Talk and Kenny Beats	Squalor	"Clutch/A.N.M."	
2020	Trash Talk and Kenny Beats	Squalor	"Kicking and Screaming"	
2020	SL	Selhurst SE25	"Bad Luck"	
2020	SL	Selhurst SE25	"Little Bird"	
2020	SL	Selhurst SE25	"Leave Me Alone"	
2020	Smino, JID, and Kenny Beats	Non-album single	"Baguetti"	
2020	Dominic Fike	What Could Possibly Go Wrong	"Florida"	
2020	James Vincent McMorrow and Kenny Beats	Grapefruit Season	"I Should Go"	
2020	Joji	Nectar	"Mr. Hollywood"	
2020	Fivio Foreign and Kenny Beats	Non-album single	"Bop It" (featuring Polo G)	
2020	Benee	Hey U X	"Night Garden"	
2020	Mae Muller	no one else, not even you	"Plot Twist"	
2020	Bastille	Goosebumps EP	"Goosebumps"	
2021	Flo Milli	You Still Here, Ho?	"Roaring 20s"	
2021	347aidan	Non-album single	"IDWK"	
2021	Slowthai	TYRON	"Focus" (produced with Dominic Maker)	
2021	Slowthai	TYRON	"Terms (featuring Dominic Fike & Denzel Curry)" (produced with Dominic Maker and JD. Reid)	
2021	Denzel Curry & Kenny Beats	Unlocked 1.5	"So.Incredible.pkg (Robert Glasper Version)"(featuring Smino and Robert Glasper)	
2021	Denzel Curry & Kenny Beats	Unlocked 1.5	"Track07 (Georgia Anne Muldrow Version)" (featuring Arlo Parks)	
2021	Denzel Curry & Kenny Beats	Unlocked 1.5	"'Cosmic'.m4a (The Alchemist Version)" (featuring Joey Badass)	
2021	Denzel Curry & Kenny Beats	Unlocked 1.5	"Take_it_Back_v2 (Charlie Heat Version)"	
2021	Denzel Curry & Kenny Beats	Unlocked 1.5	"Pyro (Sango Leak)" (featuring Kenny Mason)	
2021	Denzel Curry & Kenny Beats	Unlocked 1.5	"Lay_Up.m4a (Jay Versace Version)"	
2021	Denzel Curry & Kenny Beats	Unlocked 1.5	"DIET_1.5" (featuring Benny the Butcher)	
2021	Denzel Curry & Kenny Beats	Unlocked 1.5	"Take_it_Back_v2 (GODMODE 950 Version)"	
2021	Vince Staples	Vince Staples	"ARE YOU WITH THAT?" (produced with Reske)	
2021	Vince Staples	Vince Staples	"LAW OF AVERAGES" (produced with Reske)	
2021	Vince Staples	Vince Staples	"SUNDOWN TOWN"	
2021	Vince Staples	Vince Staples	"THE SHINING" (produced with WahWah James and Harper Gordon)	
2021	Vince Staples	Vince Staples	"TAKING TRIPS" (produced with Monte Booker)	
2021	Vince Staples	Vince Staples	"THE APPLE & THE TREE"	
2021	Vince Staples	Vince Staples	"TAKE ME HOME"	
2021	Vince Staples	Vince Staples	"LIL FADE"	
2021	Vince Staples	Vince Staples	"LAKEWOOD MALL"	
2021	Vince Staples	Vince Staples	"MHM" (produced with Nils)	
2021	IDLES	Crawler	"MTT 420 RR"	
2021	IDLES	Crawler	"The Wheel"	
2021	IDLES	Crawler	"When the Lights Come On"	
2021	IDLES	Crawler	"Car Crash	
2021	IDLES	Crawler	"The New Sensation"	
2021	IDLES	Crawler	"Stockholm Syndrome"	
2021	IDLES	Crawler	"The Beachland Ballroom"	
2021	IDLES	Crawler	"Crawl!"	
2021	IDLES	Crawler	"Meds"	
2021	IDLES	Crawler	"Kelechi"	
2021	IDLES	Crawler	"Progress"	
2021	IDLES	Crawler	"Wizz"	
2021	IDLES	Crawler	"King Snake"	
2021	IDLES	Crawler	"The End"	
2021	Roddy Ricch	Live Life Fast	"Murda One" (featuring Fivio Foreign) (produced with Nils)	
2021	Isaiah Rashad	The House Is Burning	"Score" (featuring SZA and 6LACK)	
2021	Isaiah Rashad	Non-album single	"200/Warning" (produced with Nabeyin, Amaire Johnson, Rory Behr & Almatic)	
2021	ALLBLACK	TY4FWM	"Ego" (featuring Drakeo the Ruler)	
2021	Fivio Foreign	Non-album single	"Unruly"	
2021	Ski Mask the Slump God	Sin City The Mixtape	"Merlin's Staff"	
2021	Offset Jim and Kenny Beats	Rich Off The Pack	"Face Card"	
2021	Remi Wolf	Juno	"Front Tooth"	
2021	Remble	It's Remble	"Book Bag" (featuring BlueBucksClan)	
2021	Remble	It's Remble	"Firesticc" (featuring B.A.)	
2022	Vince Staples	Ramona Park Broke My Heart	"THE BEACH"	
2022	Vince Staples	Ramona Park Broke My Heart	"DJ QUIK"	
2022	Vince Staples	Ramona Park Broke My Heart	"MAGIC (featuring Mustard)"	
2022	Vince Staples	Ramona Park Broke My Heart	"EAST POINT PRAYER (featuring Lil Baby)"	
2022	Vince Staples	Ramona Park Broke My Heart	"LEMONADE (featuring Ty Dolla Sign)"	
2022	Vince Staples	Ramona Park Broke My Heart	"BANG THAT (featuring Mustard)"	
2022	Vince Staples	Ramona Park Broke My Heart	"ROSE STREET"	
2022	Vince Staples	Ramona Park Broke My Heart	"THE BLUES"	
2022	Denzel Curry	Melt My Eyez See Your Future	"Troubles" (featuring T-Pain)	
2022	Denzel Curry	Melt My Eyez See Your Future	"Larger Than Life" [extended edition track]	
2022	Dermot Kennedy	Sonder	"Homeward"	
2022	Freddie Gibbs	$oul $old $eparately	"Ice Cream" (featuring Rick Ross) [bonus edition track]	
2022	Benee	Lychee	"Soft Side"	
2022	TiaCorine	I Can't Wait	"Chaka Khan" (featured artist)	
2022	Alexander 23	Non-album single	"ill" (featured artist)	
2022	Benny Sings	Young Hearts	"The Only One"	
2022	Benny Sings	Young Hearts	"The World"	
2023	Benny Sings	Young Hearts	"Young Hearts"	
2023	Dominic Fike	Sunburn	"Dancing In The Courthouse"	
2023	Dominic Fike	Sunburn	"Mona Lisa"	
2023	Quavo	Rocket Power	"Fueled Up"	
2023	Knucks	Non-album single	"I Suppose" (featuring Larry June)	
2023	IDLES	TANGK	"Dancer" (featuring LCD Soundsystem)	
2023	IDLES	TANGK	"Grace"	
2024	IDLES	TANGK	"Gift Horse"	
2024	IDLES	TANGK	"IDEA 01"	
2024	IDLES	TANGK	"POP POP POP"	
2024	IDLES	TANGK	"Roy"	
2024	IDLES	TANGK	"A Gospel"	
2024	IDLES	TANGK	"Hall & Oates"	
2024	IDLES	TANGK	"Jungle"	
2024	IDLES	TANGK	"Gratitude"	
2024	IDLES	TANGK	"Monolith"	
2024	Kenny Mason	Non-album single	"100%"	
2024	Dermot Kennedy	I've Told the Trees Everything	"Lessons"	
2024	Rachel Chinouriri	What a Devastating Turn of Events	"Dumb Bitch Juice"	
2024	Anycia	PRINCESS POP THAT	"EAT!"	
2024	Remi Wolf	Big Ideas	"Motorcycle"	
2024	Remi Wolf	Big Ideas	"Just the Start"	
2025	Toro y Moi	Non-album single	"Daria"	
2025	Skiifall	Lovers Till I'm Gone	"Tomorrow Promised Us"	
2025	Skiifall	Lovers Till I'm Gone	"Problems"	
2025	Skiifall	Lovers Till I'm Gone	"Sandy"	
2025	Skiifall	Lovers Till I'm Gone	"Interlude"	
2025	Skiifall	Lovers Till I'm Gone	"No More"	
2025	Skiifall	Lovers Till I'm Gone	"Her World"	
2025	Skiifall	Lovers Till I'm Gone	"Mystery Man"	
2025	Provoker	Mausoleum	"Swarm of Flies"	
2025	Provoker	Mausoleum	"Tears in the Club"	
2025	Provoker	Mausoleum	"Prisoner of Love"	
2025	Provoker	Mausoleum	"Pantomime"	
2025	Provoker	Mausoleum	"Germaphobe"	
2025	Provoker	Mausoleum	"Another Boy"	
2025	Provoker	Mausoleum	"Gun2myhead"	
2025	Provoker	Mausoleum	"Glow in the Dark"	
2025	Provoker	Mausoleum	"Mausoleum"	
2025	Provoker	Mausoleum	"Singing Gun"	
2025	Provoker	Mausoleum	"Replay"	
2025	TiaCorine	Corinian	"Ironic"	
2025	Lurker	film score		
2025	Geese	Getting Killed	"Trinidad"	
2025	Geese	Getting Killed	"Cobra"	
2025	Geese	Getting Killed	"Husbands"	
2025	Geese	Getting Killed	"Getting Killed"	
2025	Geese	Getting Killed	"Islands of Men"	
2025	Geese	Getting Killed	"100 Horses"	
2025	Geese	Getting Killed	"Half Real"	
2025	Geese	Getting Killed	"Au Pays du Cocaine"	
2025	Geese	Getting Killed	"Bow Down"	
2025	Geese	Getting Killed	"Taxes"	
2025	Geese	Getting Killed	"Long Island City Here I Come"	
2026	Fcukers	Ö	"I Like It Like That"	
2026	Fcukers	Ö	"LU.C.K.Y"	
2026	Joji	Piss in the Wind	"Piece of You"	
2026	Joji	Piss in the Wind	"Sojourn"	
2026	Weezer	Weezer	"Say Yes"	
2026	Weezer	Weezer	"Shine Again"	
2026	Weezer	Weezer	"Don't Make It Weird"	
2026	Weezer	Weezer	"We Might as Well Be Strangers"	
2026	Weezer	Weezer	"C.E.O."	
2026	Weezer	Weezer	"Hoops"	
2026	Weezer	Weezer	"Nowhere"	
2026	Weezer	Weezer	"The Show Must Go On"	
2026	Weezer	Weezer	"Up in the Clouds"	
2026	Weezer	Weezer	"The LA Sound"	
