= 3 Nights =

2018 debut single by Dominic Fike

Single by Dominic Fike

from the EP Don't Forget About Me, Demos
- Released: October 16, 2018
- Genre: Alternative; rap rock
- Length: 2:57
- Label: Columbia
- Songwriter: Dominic Fike
- Producer: Kevin "Capi" Carbo

Dominic Fike singles chronology
"3 Nights" (2018)	"Açaí Bowl" (2019)

Music video
- "3 Nights" on YouTube

"3 Nights" is the debut single by American singer-songwriter Dominic Fike. It was released as a single from his Don't Forget About Me, Demos EP through Columbia Records on October 16, 2018, and peaked within the top ten of the charts in Australia, Belgium (Flanders), Croatia, Israel, the Netherlands, New Zealand, the Republic of Ireland and the United Kingdom, and within the top forty of the charts in Germany. "3 Nights" revolves around Fike staying up late at a motel in the "City of Palms", otherwise known as Fort Myers, Florida, and the conversations and nude pictures he receives from a girl. The lyrics include Fike offering said girl to stay with him and call him "what you want, when you want, if you want".

== Critical reception ==
In a profile on Fike, The New Yorker said the parent EP of the song is "nostalgic for the early-two-thousands beach-bonfire style of Jack Johnson, with some of the watered-down reggae of 311 and the Red Hot Chili Peppers." It further said "3 Nights" could "generously be classified as high-quality retail music", calling it "easy to listen to" and comparing it to "Rude" by Canadian reggae fusion band Magic! Matthew Strauss of Pitchfork gave the track a negative review; he described it as "absolutely harmless to a fault" and "neither soothing nor pleasant", further criticizing its lyrics as "mildly endearing but utterly forgettable".

== Music video ==
A music video directed by Nathan Rickard was released on April 4, 2019, and features Fike with friends in his hometown of Naples, Florida and Miami International Inn Motel, with a snippet of an unreleased song being played at the end. Kevin Abstract also shared an alternate video he directed for the song, which was described by Fike as "messing around".

== Charts ==
=== Weekly charts ===
Chart (2019–2020)	Peak position
Australia (ARIA)	3
Austria (Ö3 Austria Top 40)	69
Belgium (Ultratip Bubbling Under Flanders)	4
Belgium (Ultratip Bubbling Under Wallonia)	19
Canada Rock (Billboard)	10
Croatia (HRT)	5
Czech Republic Singles Digital (ČNS IFPI)	62
France (SNEP)	158
Germany (GfK)	36
Ireland (IRMA)	2
Israel (Media Forest)	7
Latvia (LAIPA)	13
Lithuania (AGATA)	18
Netherlands (Dutch Top 40)	6
Netherlands (Single Top 100)	12
New Zealand (Recorded Music NZ)	6
Poland Airplay (ZPAV)	31
San Marino (SMRRTV Top 50)	37
Scottish Singles Sales (Official Charts)	4
Slovakia Airplay (ČNS IFPI)	30
Slovakia Singles Digital (ČNS IFPI)	45
Slovenia (SloTop50)	22
Sweden Heatseeker (Sverigetopplistan)	2
UK Singles (Official Charts)	3
US Bubbling Under Hot 100 (Billboard)	21
US Adult Pop Airplay (Billboard)	19
US Rock & Alternative Airplay (Billboard)	4

=== Year-end charts ===
Chart (2019)	Position
Australia (ARIA)	11
Germany (Official German Charts)	83
Ireland (IRMA)	6
Latvia (LAIPA)	31
Netherlands (Dutch Top 40)	87
New Zealand (Recorded Music NZ)	20
UK Singles (OCC)	24
US Rock Airplay (Billboard)	11

Chart (2020)	Position
Netherlands (Dutch Top 40)	41
Netherlands (Single Top 100)	55

== Certifications ==
Region	Certification	Certified units/sales
Australia (ARIA)	12× Platinum	840,000^{‡}
Brazil (Pro-Música Brasil)	2× Platinum	80,000^{‡}
Canada (Music Canada)	5× Platinum	400,000^{‡}
Denmark (IFPI Danmark)	Platinum	90,000^{‡}
France (SNEP)	Platinum	200,000^{‡}
Germany (BVMI)	Gold	200,000^{‡}
Italy (FIMI)	Gold	35,000^{‡}
Mexico (AMPROFON)	Gold	30,000^{‡}
Netherlands (NVPI)	Gold	40,000^{‡}
New Zealand (RMNZ)	6× Platinum	180,000^{‡}
Poland (ZPAV)	Gold	10,000^{‡}
Spain (Promusicae)	Gold	30,000^{‡}
Switzerland (IFPI Switzerland)	Gold	10,000^{‡}
United Kingdom (BPI)	3× Platinum	1,800,000^{‡}
United States (RIAA)	4× Platinum	4,000,000^{‡}
^{‡} Sales+streaming figures based on certification alone.
