= White Keys =

2025 single by Dominic Fike

Single by Dominic Fike

from the album How to Quit Smoking
- Released: November 14, 2025
- Genre: Indie pop
- Length: 2:24
- Label: Columbia
- Songwriters: Dominic Fike; John Cunningham
- Producers: Fike; Cunningham

Dominic Fike singles chronology
"Love Hangover" (2025)	"White Keys" (2025)	"Images of Love" (2025)

"White Keys" is a single by American singer-songwriter Dominic Fike, released on November 14, 2025, through Columbia Records. He wrote and produced it with John Cunningham. The song was included on his third studio album, How to Quit Smoking.

== Background ==
Dominic Fike recorded the song in the studio one night while he was drunk. The song leaked in 2020, and was eventually released in 2025 due to popular demand. In an Instagram post announcing the release, Fike wrote "I had forgot about this song and the internet somehow dug it up for me."

== Critical reception ==
Alexander Cole of HotNewHipHop wrote "Throughout the song, we get some emotional lyrics and a sweet guitar-driven instrumental. It is the type of song that you would expect from Fike, but that doesn't take away from the impact these lyrics may have on you." Kylah Williams of The Fader commented "Dominic Fike's 'White Keys' is the track I'd been telepathically begging him to drop for years. Breezy, hopeful, and unmistakably at home with Fike, it has me 30,000 feet in the air awaiting what he does next."

== Charts ==
Chart performance for "White Keys"
Chart (2025–2026)	Peak position
Australia (ARIA)	13
Austria (Ö3 Austria Top 40)	4
Belgium (Ultratop 50 Flanders)	44
Canada Hot 100 (Billboard)	24
Czech Republic Singles Digital (ČNS IFPI)	66
Denmark (Tracklisten)	31
Dominican Republic Anglo Airplay (Monitor Latino)	8
Germany (GfK)	7
Global 200 (Billboard)	28
Greece International (IFPI)	86
Ireland (IRMA)	5
Lithuania (AGATA)	84
Luxembourg (Billboard)	14
Netherlands (Dutch Top 40)	15
Netherlands (Single Top 100)	10
New Zealand (Recorded Music NZ)	7
Norway (IFPI Norge)	6
Poland (Polish Streaming Top 100)	90
Portugal (AFP)	31
Slovakia Singles Digital (ČNS IFPI)	44
South Africa (Billboard)	23
Sweden (Sverigetopplistan)	19
Switzerland (Schweizer Hitparade)	7
UK Singles (Official Charts)	7
US Billboard Hot 100	32
US Hot Rock & Alternative Songs (Billboard)	6

== Certifications ==
Certifications for "White Keys"
Region	Certification	Certified units/sales
Australia (ARIA)	2× Platinum	140,000^{‡}
Austria (IFPI Austria)	Gold	15,000^{‡}
Belgium (BRMA)	Gold	20,000^{‡}
Canada (Music Canada)	Platinum	80,000^{‡}
Hungary (MAHASZ)	Gold	2,000^{‡}
New Zealand (RMNZ)	Platinum	30,000^{‡}
Portugal (AFP)	Gold	12,000^{‡}
United Kingdom (BPI)	Gold	400,000^{‡}
United States (RIAA)	Platinum	1,000,000^{‡}
Streaming
Sweden (GLF)	Gold	6,000,000^{†}
^{‡} Sales+streaming figures based on certification alone.^{†} Streaming-only figures based on certification alone.
