= What Could Possibly Go Wrong (album) =

2020 studio album by Dominic Fike

Studio album by Dominic Fike
- Released: July 31, 2020
- Recorded: 2019–2020
- Genres: Hip-hop; rock; pop
- Length: 34:24
- Label: Columbia

Dominic Fike chronology
Don't Forget About Me, Demos (2018)	What Could Possibly Go Wrong (2020)	Sunburn (2023)

Singles from What Could Possibly Go Wrong
- 1. "Chicken Tenders" Released: June 26, 2020; 2. "Politics & Violence" Released: July 9, 2020; 3. "Vampire" Released: October 30, 2020

What Could Possibly Go Wrong is the debut studio album by American singer-songwriter Dominic Fike, released through Columbia Records on July 31, 2020. It was originally scheduled for release on July 10, 2020, but due to the Black Lives Matter protests that were occurring at the time it was pushed back three weeks.

== Background ==
Fike began hinting at an album in the works in early 2019. He kept hinting at this album throughout 2019, and released the singles "Açaí Bowl", "Rollerblades", "Phone Numbers" with Kenny Beats, and "Hit Me Up" with Omar Apollo and Kenny Beats throughout the year. He also collaborated with Brockhampton several times, including on a video uploaded to Brockhampton's YouTube channel titled "This is Dominic Fike". In September 2019, he played a then unreleased song titled "Chicken Tenders" on his Rain or Shine tour.

On June 21, 2020, another video, titled "In-Focus with Dominic Fike", was uploaded to Brockhampton's YouTube channel, in which Fike talked about his upcoming debut album. On June 26, he released "Chicken Tenders", the lead single from his then yet to be named debut album. Then, on July 9, he announced that the album would be titled What Could Possibly Go Wrong and would be released on July 31. He also released the second single "Politics & Violence".

== Critical reception ==
Professional ratings
Aggregate scores
Source	Rating
Metacritic	65/100
Review scores
Source	Rating
AllMusic	3.5/5 stars
DIY	4/5 stars
God Is in the TV	4/10
The Guardian	3/5 stars
NME	4/5 stars
No Ripcord	3/10
Pitchfork	6.1/10

According to the review aggregator Metacritic, What Could Possibly Go Wrong received "generally favorable reviews" based on a weighted average score of 65 out of 100 from five critic scores.

== Track listing ==
What Could Possibly Go Wrong track listing
No.	Title	Writer(s)	Producer(s)	Length
1.	"Come Here"	Dominic Fike; Jon Wienner; Sam Homaee	Dominic Fike; The Roommates^{[a]}	1:18
2.	"Double Negative (Skeleton Milkshake)"	Fike; James Stack; Julian Cruz	Fike; Jim-E Stack; Cruz	2:06
3.	"Cancel Me"	Fike; Wienner; Homaee	Fike; The Roommates	2:17
4.	"10x Stronger"	Fike; Wienner; Cruz; Homaee	Fike; The Roommates	1:16
5.	"Good Game"	Fike	Fike	2:28
6.	"Why"	Fike; Wienner; Cruz; Homaee	Fike; The Roommates	2:20
7.	"Chicken Tenders"	Fike; Wienner; Cruz; Kevin Carbo; Phil Nageon de Lestang; Homaee	Cruz; de Lestang^{[a]}; Capi^{[b]}; The Roommates^{[b]}	2:50
8.	"What's for Dinner?"	Fike; Jimmy McCracklin; Wienner; Cruz; Lowell Fulson; Homaee	Fike; The Roommates; Cruz^{[b]}	2:18
9.	"Vampire"	Fike; Wienner; Cruz; Homaee	Fike; Cruz; The Roommates	3:06
10.	"Superstar Shit"	Fike; Wienner; Cruz; Homaee	The Roommates; Cruz^{[b]}	2:07
11.	"Politics & Violence"	Fike; Wienner; Cruz; Homaee	Cruz; The Roommates	3:18
12.	"Joe Blazey"	Fike; Wienner; Cruz; Homaee	Fike; Cruz^{[a]}; The Roommates^{[b]}	2:42
13.	"Wurli"	Fike; Wienner; Cruz; Homaee	Fike; Cruz; The Roommates	2:31
14.	"Florida"	Fike; Kenneth Blume III	Kenny Beats; Fike^{[a]}	3:48
Total length:				34:25

Notes

- ^{^[a]} signifies a co-producer
- ^{^[b]} signifies an additional producer

== Personnel ==
Musicians

- Brianna Rhodes – strings (track 11)
- Capi – production (track 7)
- Cary Singer – guitar (track 2)
- Dominic Fike – vocals, production (tracks 1–6, 8, 9, 12–14), guitar (tracks 1–5, 9), keyboard (track 14), recording engineer (track 1)
- Jim-E Stack – production (track 2)
- Julian Cruz – production (tracks 2, 7, 8, 9, 10, 11, 12, 13), strings (tracks 11, 12), additional vocals (track 12)
- Katie Capp – cello (track 11)
- Kenny Beats – producer (track 14)
- Phil Nageon de Lestang – production (track 7), guitar (track 7)
- The Roommates – production (track 1, 3, 4, 6, 7, 8, 9, 10, 11, 12, 13), strings (track 12)
- Ryan Raines – drums (track 6, 13)
- Sean Sobash – bass (track 10)
- Todd Pritchard – guitar (track 9)
- Tom Elmhirst – programmer (track 2, 13, 14)
- Westerns – guitar (track 2)
- Yasmeen – guitar (track 3), violin (track 13)

Technical personnel

- Chris Galland – assistant engineer (tracks 3, 9)
- Dominic Fike – recording engineer (tracks 1, 2, 5, 12)
- Greg Eliason – engineer (tracks 6, 13)
- Jeremie Inhaber – assistant engineer (tracks 3, 9)
- Julian Cruz – recording engineer (tracks 4, 6–9, 12, 13), mixing engineer (track 5)
- Kenny Beats – recording engineer (tracks 14)
- Manny Marroquin – mixing engineer (tracks 7, 9)
- Matt Scatchell – assistant engineer (tracks 1, 2, 4, 6–8, 10–14)
- Nick Booth – assistant engineer (tracks 6, 13)
- Randy Merrill – mastering engineer (tracks 1–14)
- Robert Florent – engineer (tracks 3, 9)
- The Roommates – recording engineer (tracks 3, 4, 6, 8–13)
- Ryan Dulude – assistant engineer (tracks 1, 3, 6, 9, 11, 13)
- Tom Elmhirst – mixing engineer (tracks 1–6, 8, 10, 12–14)

== Charts ==
Chart performance for What Could Possibly Go Wrong
Chart (2020)	Peak position
Australian Albums (ARIA)	34
Canadian Albums (Billboard)	50
New Zealand Albums (RMNZ)	28
US Billboard 200	41
US Top Alternative Albums (Billboard)	4
US Top Rock Albums (Billboard)	4

== Certifications ==
Certifications for What Could Possibly Go Wrong
Region	Certification	Certified units/sales
New Zealand (RMNZ)	Gold	7,500^{‡}
^{‡} Sales+streaming figures based on certification alone.
