= Don't Forget About Me, Demos =

EP by Dominic Fike
- Released: October 16, 2018
- Recorded: 2017–2018
- Genres: Pop; rock; hip-hop
- Length: 14:03; 17:34 (2019 reissue)
- Label: Columbia

Dominic Fike chronology
| Don't Forget About Me, Demos (2018) | What Could Possibly Go Wrong (2020) |

Singles from Don't Forget About Me, Demos
- 1. "3 Nights" Released: October 16, 2018; 2. "Babydoll" Released: February 27, 2026

Don't Forget About Me, Demos is the debut extended play by American singer-songwriter Dominic Fike, released on October 16, 2018, by Columbia Records.

== Background ==
Most of the songs that appear on the EP were recorded in late 2017 while Fike was on house arrest for battery of a police officer and were released independently through SoundCloud. In 2018, while serving a short jail sentence for breaking the terms of his house arrest, Fike's music generated a substantial amount of interest and sparked a bidding war amongst record labels. During this time all of his independently released music was removed from streaming services. On August 3, it was announced he had signed with Columbia Records for a reported $3–4 million. On October 16, he officially released Don't Forget About Me, Demos as his major-label debut. Fike cited Isaiah Rashad and his 2014 EP Cilvia Demo as an influence on the project.

== Critical reception ==
Professional ratings
Review scores
| Source | Rating |
|---|---|
| Rolling Stone | 3/5 stars |

Don't Forget About Me, Demos received generally positive reviews from critics. Elias Leight of Rolling Stone wrote, "Fike can accomplish a lot in a short period of time, and he will need to, if the label hopes to recoup its investment. But there are enough sparks on Don't Forget About Me to make you curious about what else he can do."

== Commercial performance ==
In the United States, Don't Forget About Me, Demos peaked at number 76 on the Billboard 200, and at number 18 on the Top Rock & Alternative Albums chart.

== Track listing ==
All songs written and produced by Dominic Fike, unless otherwise noted.

Don't Forget About Me, Demos track listing
| No. | Title | Writer(s) | Producer(s) | Length |
|---|---|---|---|---|
| 1. | "3 Nights" | Dominic Fike; Kevin Carbo | Kevin "Capi" Carbo | 2:58 |
| 2. | "She Wants My Money" | | | 2:13 |
| 3. | "Babydoll" | Fike; Julian Cruz | | 1:38 |
| 4. | "Westcoast Collective" | | | 1:48 |
| 5. | "Socks" | Fike; Christopher Santos | Fike; Santos | 2:11 |
| 6. | "King of Everything" | | | 3:15 |
| Total length: | | | | 14:03 |

2019 reissue bonus tracks
| No. | Title | Length |
|---|---|---|
| 7. | "Falling Asleep" | 1:49 |
| 8. | "Batshit" | 1:43 |
| Total length: | | 17:34 |

== Charts ==
Chart performance for Don't Forget About Me, Demos
| Chart (2026) | Peak position |
|---|---|
| Canadian Albums (Billboard) | 44 |
| Hungarian Albums (MAHASZ) | 28 |
| Lithuanian Albums (AGATA) | 65 |
| Norwegian Albums (IFPI Norge) | 92 |
| US Billboard 200 | 76 |
| US Top Rock & Alternative Albums (Billboard) | 18 |

== Certifications ==
Certifications for Don't Forget About Me, Demos
| Region | Certification | Certified units/sales |
|---|---|---|
| Canada (Music Canada) | Gold | 40,000^{‡} |
| Denmark (IFPI Danmark) | Gold | 10,000^{‡} |
| New Zealand (RMNZ) | 2× Platinum | 30,000^{‡} |
^{‡} Sales+streaming figures based on certification alone.
