= Dominic Fike =

American singer-songwriter (born 1995)

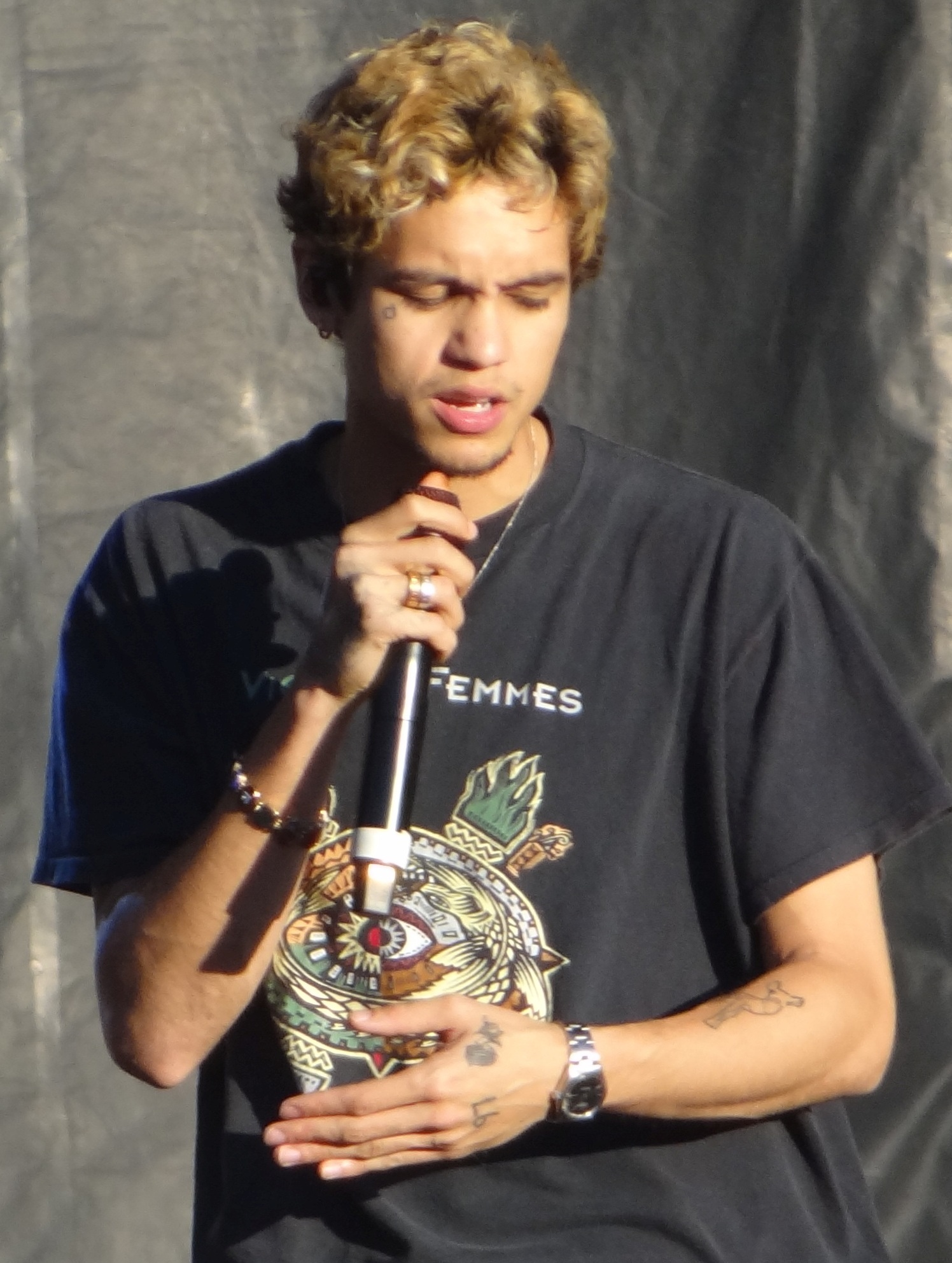
- Fike performing at Shaky Knees in 2021

Background information
- Born: Dominic David Fike; December 30, 1995 (age 30); Naples, Florida, U.S.
- Genres: Alternative hip-hop; rap rock; pop rock; alternative rock; indie pop; indie rock
- Occupations: Singer; rapper; songwriter; actor
- Instruments: Vocals; guitar; drums; bass
- Years active: 2017–present
- Label: Columbia
- Member of: Geezer
- Website: dominicfike.com
- Children: 1

Dominic David Fike (born December 30, 1995) is an American singer, rapper, songwriter and actor. He first received recognition after releasing several popular songs to the website SoundCloud. Following the release of his debut extended play, Don't Forget About Me, Demos in 2018, he signed to Columbia Records. Fike's song "3 Nights" reached the top ten in several countries. He later collaborated with fellow American musicians Brockhampton and Halsey. His debut album, What Could Possibly Go Wrong, was released in 2020. The album charted in the top 50 of multiple countries, including the United States and Australia. He recorded a cover of Paul McCartney's song "The Kiss of Venus" for the album McCartney III Imagined (2021).

In 2022, Fike became a cast member of the second season of Euphoria (2022), in his first main acting role, playing Elliot, a drug-abusing teenager. In 2023, Fike released his second studio album, Sunburn, preceded by singles "Dancing in the Courthouse", "Ant Pile", "Mona Lisa" (a track which is featured in the 2023 animated superhero film Spider-Man: Across the Spider-Verse), and "Mama's Boy".

== Early life ==
Dominic David Fike was born December 30, 1995, in Naples, Florida, to Jessica Fike and David Mills. He is of mixed English, African-American, Haitian, Filipino and German descent. Fike has at least six older step-siblings on his maternal side; a younger brother, and a younger half-sister.

Growing up, both of Fike's parents were heroin addicts. His father was absent for much of his childhood. When Fike was ten, his father re-entered his life for a week, in which time he taught Fike a few chords on the guitar, before he left again. His mother had persistent problems with drug addiction and spent much of Fike's childhood in and out of jail, causing him to stay in different homes, such as those of his older brother, distant relatives or his parents' friends. Fike recalled that he and his brother often had to take care of each other due to his parents' frequent absence from his life. He has also said that he frequently witnessed domestic violence growing up, due to a number of violent stepfathers.

Fike has said his childhood life was "full of adventure", as he and his friends would spend time in a forested area near their neighborhood that they called the "Forest of Avalon", where he said they would eat snacks and smoke cannabis. Fike went to a number of different high schools, including Naples High, Estero High, and Palmetto Ridge High School, graduating from the latter in 2014. Fike briefly enrolled in a college but dropped out after fewer than three days.

Fike was a fan of Jack Johnson, Blink-182, The Strokes and Red Hot Chili Peppers. He first acquired a guitar at the age of ten and learned how to play songs by the Red Hot Chili Peppers. Dominic began rapping circa 2014, taking on the alias L$G (standing for Lord Space Goat.) He and his older step-brother Sean (alias Slyte) would often hang out at the guest house of a friend's home, Stefan, which they nicknamed the "Backhouse", where they would freestyle. Backhouse LLC was established as a record label soon after this, which many of the members published songs under, including Dominic, until he was signed to Columbia Records.

Members of Backhouse and others on the Naples rap scene at the time coalesced into a formal rap collective which attracted an audience in the community. Fike's childhood friend, Gibran, officially formed this sub-group called Lame Boyz Entertainment, commonly stylised as 'LBE' or 'Lame Boyz ENT.' Fike has the letters LBE tattooed on his forehead, making reference to this collective. Fike started uploading songs on the Internet in high school. The first song he uploaded on YouTube was called "Not a Word", rapped over the instrumental of Mobb Deep's "Survival of the Fittest". He also put songs he recorded onto tapes.

== Career ==
=== 2017–2018: Don't Forget About Me, Demos ===
Fike first gained recognition by making beats with his then producer, Hunter Pfeiffer (known as 54), leading to several popular songs on SoundCloud being published. He released the EP Don't Forget About Me, Demos at the age of 22 in October 2018 as a signed artist, which was recorded while he was on house arrest for battery of a police officer. Fike recalls the story as defending his younger brother, as he believed the police officer pulled a gun on Alex, so Dominic subsequently tripped the police officer up. He later went to serve time at Collier County Jail for violating that house arrest. The EP caught the attention of several record labels and sparked a bidding war. During this time, all of Fike's independently released music before the EP was removed from streaming services. After being released back in April 2018, he signed with Columbia for a reported $4 million in August. Fike said he used part of his first check from Columbia to hire a lawyer for his mother, who had been sentenced to prison on drug charges.

The EP was released by Columbia on October 16, 2018. "3 Nights" was released as a single the same year. The single gained wide attention and peaked within the top ten of the charts in Australia, Ireland, and the United Kingdom. It had its acoustic guitar sound compared to the music of Jack Johnson. It was placed on rotation on several radio stations and Spotify playlists, and received favorable reviews from outlets such as Rolling Stone, Pitchfork and Billboard. In reference to the EP, Billboard described Fike as a "genre-meshing" artist, and later named him a breakout act to watch, calling "3 Nights" a "Motown-tinged breakout track" that is "trend-proof and irresistible". A music video for the single was released on April 4, 2019, to Fike's YouTube channel.

=== 2019–2022: What Could Possibly Go Wrong ===
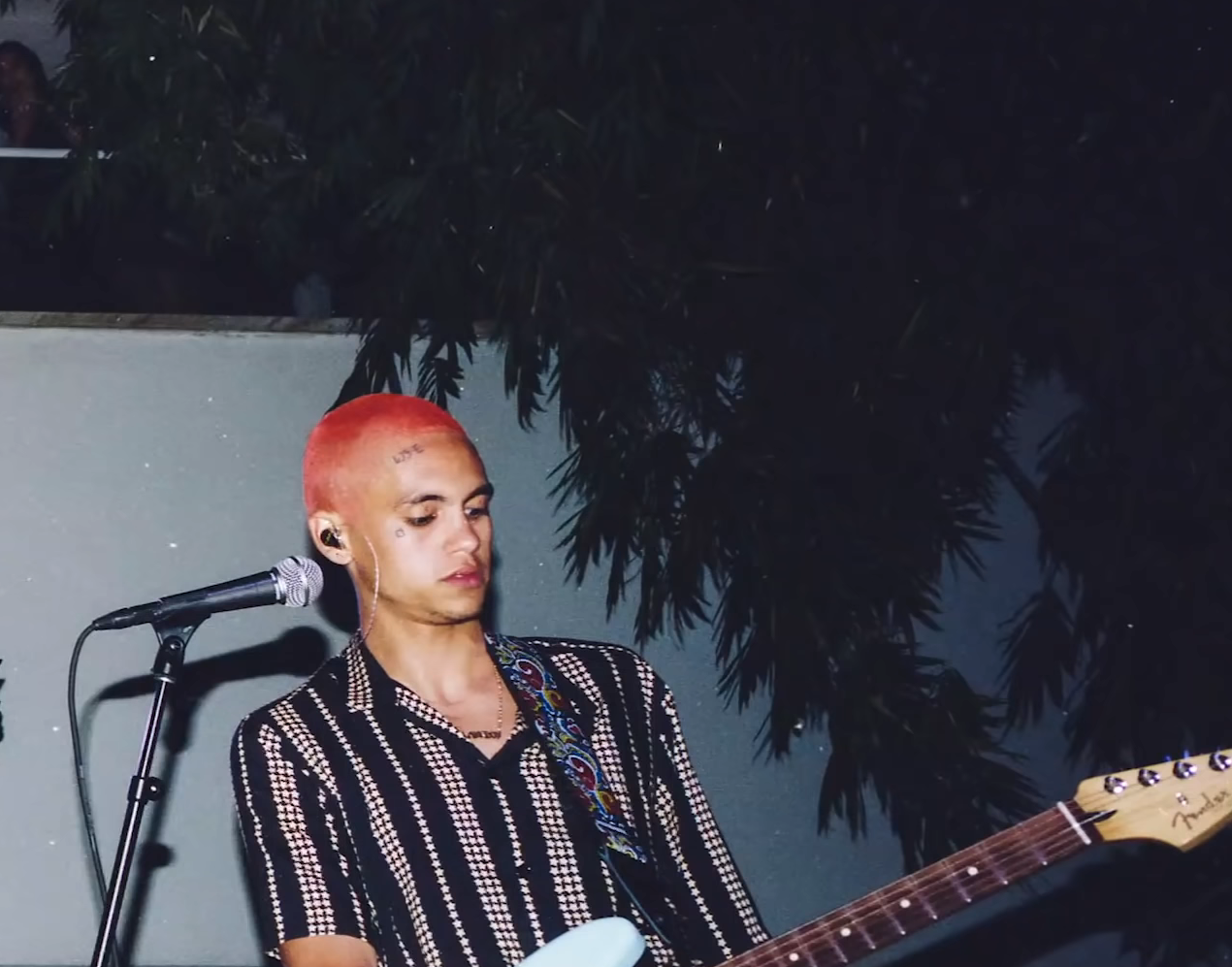
Fike performing in 2019

In January 2019, Fike revealed he was working on an album. On April 4, 2019, Brockhampton uploaded a video to their YouTube channel called "This Is Dominic Fike" which featured his single "3 Nights" in it. As of April 2019, multiple collaborations with Brockhampton's Kevin Abstract have been posted. Reaching over 4 million views with their biggest hit being a song called "Peach" off Kevin Abstract's Arizona Baby album.

On June 7, 2019, he released two singles, "Açaí Bowl" and "Rollerblades". He followed these with another single, "Phone Numbers," produced by Kenny Beats, on July 4, 2019, which was featured in the FIFA 20 football game series.The music video for this song was released on October 15, 2019. Fike announced on July 9, 2019, that he would be going on a tour titled Rain or Shine later in the year. The North American leg of the tour began August 31 in Philadelphia and ended October 3 in Los Angeles. In September 2019, he announced that he would be doing a clothing collaboration with Marc Jacobs. On the fifth day of that month, he performed a song that was unreleased at the time, "Chicken Tenders", at a Chicago concert during his Rain or Shine tour. On January 17, 2020, Fike released a collaboration with Halsey titled "Dominic's Interlude" from the latter's third studio album, Manic. On June 26, 2020, "Chicken Tenders", the first single from his then yet-to-be-named debut studio album, was released. On July 9, he released the single "Politics & Violence" and announced that his debut studio album would be called What Could Possibly Go Wrong and released on July 31. On August 7, 2020, Fike was the subject of the second episode of The New York Times Presents. In September 2020, Fike became a headliner for the Fortnite concert series. On March 19, 2021, Fike was featured on Justin Bieber's song titled "Die for You" from the latter's sixth studio album, Justice. In August 2021, it was announced that Fike had joined the cast of the Zendaya-led, HBO teen drama Euphoria for its second season. In 2023, Fike revealed that he was nearly removed from the cast of the show as a result of his frequent drug use during production.

=== 2023–2025: Sunburn ===
In April 2023, Fike performed at Coachella art festival for the first time. On April 7, 2023, Fike deleted all posts from his Instagram account and posted the first teaser of the upcoming single "Dancing in the Courthouse", which was later released on April 14, 2023. On May 18, 2023, he finally announced his second studio album, Sunburn, which was then set to contain 15 tracks. On May 27, 2023, the second single "Ant Pile" was released. On June 2, 2023, Fike released the single "Mona Lisa", the same day that American record producer Metro Boomin released his first soundtrack album, which was for the film Spider-Man: Across the Spider-Verse. The song was originally included on the deluxe edition of the soundtrack album, which was released three days after the film and the standard edition, but the song was later removed and instead added to some versions of Sunburn. On May 30, 2023, Fike announced the Don't Stare at the Sun North American tour, with the starting date on July 13, 2023, in Indianapolis. On July 5, 2023, Fike further announced that the tour would continue in the UK, playing in Glasgow, Manchester, Birmingham and London. The fourth and final single, "Mama's Boy", was released on June 23, 2023, alongside the full new track listing for the album. Sunburn was released on July 7, 2023, through Columbia, with 15 tracks.

On April 24, 2024, Fike shared his new EP titled 14 minutes, to an exclusive group of fans in Los Angeles, California. He uploaded a YouTube video of him running to the 14-minute long EP. The EP was subsequently released onto streaming services on May 3, 2024.

On January 31, 2025, Fike was featured on "Love Hangover" with Blackpink member Jennie, the second single from her album Ruby. The song peaked at number 96 on the Billboard Hot 100, becoming his fourth entry on the chart.

In February 2025, Fike was confirmed to reprise his role portraying Elliot in the third season of Euphoria. However, the scenes he filmed for the season were removed from the final cut of the show, without a given reason.

In June 2025, Fike formed the musical duo Geezer with long-time friend and fellow artist, Kevin Abstract. This duo performed as an established group at the first time at Camp Flog Gnaw in November 2025.

On August 15, 2025, Fike released the first three songs of his first mixtape, Rocket. He would then release the mixtape a week later on August 22, 2025, on every streaming platform.

On November 14th, 2025, Fike released his song "White Keys" on streaming platforms, following the song being leaked. Since release, the song has started multiple viral trends on TikTok and amassed over 134 million streams on Spotify. It debuted at #85 and peaked at #32 on Billboard Hot 100.

=== 2026–present: How To Quit Smoking ===
Fike performing at The Wiltern in Los Angeles during the Comedy Tragedy Parody Tour in September 2026.

On February 27, 2026, Fike re-released his 2018 song “Babydoll” as a single, in response to its sudden virality on TikTok and other social media apps. The song surpassed a billion streams on Spotify on March 16, 2026, and peaked at #16 on the Billboard Hot 100.

In April 2026, Fike announced the North American leg of his Comedy Tragedy Parody Tour, taking place in August and September. The tour originally started back in Australia in December 2025.

On August 28, 2026 Dominic Fike announced his third album, How to Quit Smoking, was set to release on October 30, 2026, although he teased the project during his tour opener on August 15, 2026. It was delayed to October 30, 2026. The lead single, "Wallflower," was released on August 28, 2026, with the second single, "Small Town," which features rising artists Emma Ogier and Gabriel Jacoby, following shortly after on September 18, 2026. The final single, "Pangea," was released on October 19, 2026, alongside a 24/7 streaming channel, the Separate Street Network, avaliable on his website.

On October 10, 2026, Fike performed at Arcosanti FORM Music Festival at a first time "Fresh Finds" stage presented by Spotify in collaboration with FORM.

== Personal life ==
Fike met actress Hunter Schafer while working on the second season of Euphoria. They reportedly began dating in January 2022, with Fike confirming in an interview in July 2023 that they had split. Fike announced in December 2025 that he was in a relationship. In April 2026, Fike confirmed he had a son. He has stated that fatherhood and his son's wellbeing have been primary motivators for his continued sobriety and stability.

== Discography ==
- What Could Possibly Go Wrong (2020)
- Sunburn (2023)
- How to Quit Smoking (2026)

== Filmography ==
=== Film ===
Year	Title	Role	Director	Notes
2023	Earth Mama	Miles	Savanah Leaf	
2024	Junk	AJ	Jack Begert	Originally titled Little Death

=== Television ===
Year	Title	Role	Notes
2020	The New York Times Presents	Self	Documentary series
2022	Euphoria	Elliot	Main role (season 2)

== Concert tours ==
=== Headlining ===
- Rain or Shine Tour (2019)
- Out of Order Tour (2022)
- Don't Stare at the Sun Tour (2023)
- Comedy Tragedy Parody Tour (2025-2027)

=== Opening act ===
- Deadbeat Tour for Tame Impala (2025–2026)

== Awards and nominations ==
List of awards and nominations
Year	Organisation	Award	Work	Result
2020	NME	Essential New Artists for 2020	Himself	Included
2022	Grammy Awards	Album of the Year	Justice (as featured artist)	Nominated
2022	MTV Movie & TV Awards	Best Kiss (Shared with Hunter Schafer)	Euphoria	Nominated
