= Denzel Curry discography =

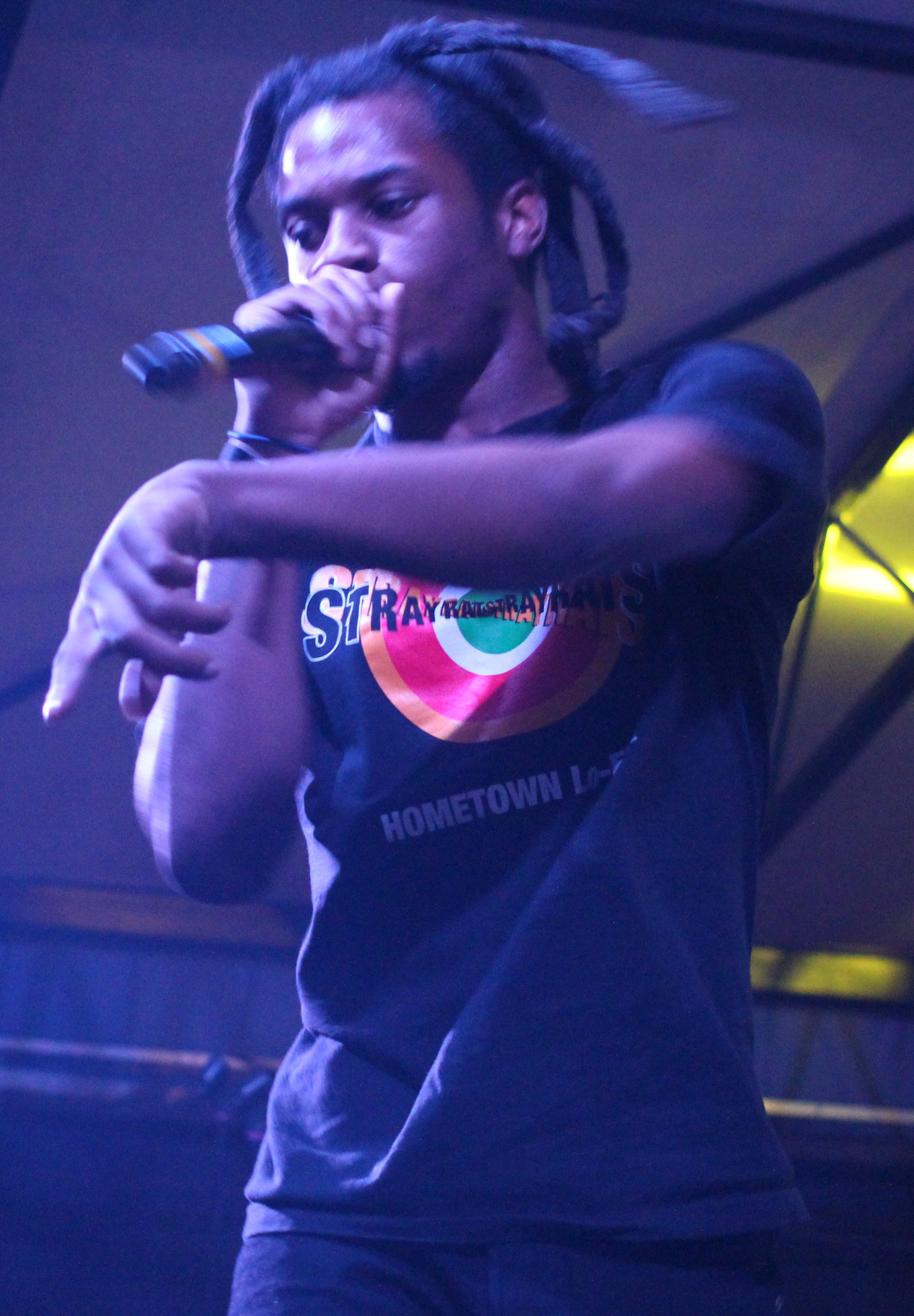
- Curry performing in 2017
- Studio albums: 5
- EPs: 6
- Mixtapes: 8
- Singles: 76
- Music videos: 36
- Guest appearances: 77
- Collaborative albums: 2

American rapper Denzel Curry has released five studio albums, eight mixtapes, six extended plays and 76 singles (including 36 as a featured artist and four promotional singles).

Curry released his debut mixtape King Remembered Underground Tape 1991–1995 in September 2011. The mixtape led to him joining SpaceGhostPurrp's Raider Klan collective. In 2012, he released a second mixtape, titled King of the Mischievous South Vol. 1 Underground Tape 1996, which caught the attention of fellow American rapper Earl Sweatshirt. His third mixtape Strictly for My R.V.I.D.X.R.S. was released that same year.

In 2013, Raider Klan disbanded. Curry would go on to release his debut studio album Nostalgic 64 in September 2013. In June 2015, he released his first double EP 32 Zel/Planet Shrooms, which included his breakout hit "Ultimate", which has since amassed over 200 million streams on Spotify. He released his second studio album Imperial in 2016. The album's hype led to him being featured on the cover of the 2016 XXL Freshmen Class.

He released his third extended play 13 in June 2017, followed by his third studio album Ta13oo in July 2018. It included the single "Clout Cobain", which peaked at number 6 on the Billboard Bubbling Under R&B/Hip-Hop Singles chart and was certified Gold by the Recording Industry Association of America.

The album was followed by his fourth studio album Zuu, which was released in May 2019 to further acclaim.

In February 2020, Curry and hip hop producer Kenny Beats released a collaborative EP titled Unlocked, alongside an accompanying short film. In March 2021, Curry and Beats released Unlocked 1.5, a remix album of Unlocked.

In March 2022, Curry released his fifth studio album, Melt My Eyez See Your Future. In September 2022, Curry released Melt My Eyez See Your Future (The Extended Edition), featuring reimagined versions of songs from the original album with live instrumentation performed by the Cold Blooded Soul Band.

In May 2023, Curry shared the live EP Live at Electric Lady, which featured additional versions of Melt My Eyez songs and a cover of Erykah Badu's "Didn't Cha Know" with Bilal.

== Studio albums ==
List of studio albums, with selected details and chart positions
Title	Details	Peak chart positions						
Title	Details	US	US R&B/ HH	US Rap	AUS	CAN	NZ	UK
Nostalgic 64	Released: September 3, 2013; Label: C9, L&E; Format: CD, digital download	—	—	—	—	—	—	—
Imperial	Released: March 9, 2016; Label: PH, C9; Formats: CD, LP, digital download	—	—	—	—	—	—	—
Ta13oo	Released: July 27, 2018; Label: PH, Loma Vista; Formats: CD, LP, digital download	28	15	13	27	84	16	62
Zuu	Released: May 31, 2019; Label: PH, Loma Vista; Formats: CD, LP, digital download	32	19	17	18	36	21	61
Melt My Eyez See Your Future	Released: March 25, 2022; Label: PH, Loma Vista; Formats: CD, LP, cassette, digital download, streaming	17	11	7	12	38	17	30

== Collaborative albums ==
Title	Details	Peak chart positions	
Title	Details	AUS	NZ
II (with Kenneth Blume)	Released: August 21, 2026; Label: PH Recordings, Loma Vista; Formats: CD, LP, digital download, cassette	52	40

== EPs ==
List of extended plays, with selected details
Title	Details	Peak chart positions	
Title	Details	US	CAN
32 Zel/Planet Shrooms	Released: June 9, 2015; Label: PH Recordings, C9; Format: Digital download, LP	—	—
13	Released: June 26, 2017; Label: PH Recordings, Loma Vista; Format: Digital download, LP, cassette	—	—
Spotify Singles	Released: July 31, 2019; Label: Loma Vista; Format: Streaming (Spotify exclusive)	—	—
Live at Electric Lady	Released: May 5, 2023; Label: Loma Vista; Format: Digital download	—	—

=== Collaborative EPs ===
List of collaborative studio albums, with selected details and chart positions
Title	Details	Peak chart positions			
Title	Details	US	AUS	CAN	NZ
Unlocked (with Kenny Beats)	Released: February 7, 2020; Label: PH Recordings, Loma Vista; Formats: CD, LP, digital download, cassette	100	33	82	38
Unlocked 1.5 (with Kenny Beats)	Released: March 5, 2021; Label: PH Recordings, Loma Vista; Formats: CD, LP, digital download, cassette	—	—	—	—

== Mixtapes ==
List of mixtapes, with selected details
Title	Album details
Curry Wuz Here	Released: January 16, 2011; Label: Self-released; Format(s): Digital download
King Remembered Underground Tape 1991–1995	Released: September 24, 2011; Label: Self-released; Format(s): Digital download
King of the Mischievous South, Vol. 1 - Underground Tape 1996	Released: January 12, 2012; Label: Self-released; Format(s): Digital download
Strictly 4 My R.V.I.D.X.R.Z.	Released: May 13, 2012; Label: Self-released; Format(s): Digital download
Mental Vendetta (with Lofty305)	Released: December 31, 2012; Label: Self-released; Format(s): Digital download
13lood 1n + 13lood Out Mixx	Released: January 6, 2020; Label: Self-released; Format(s): Streaming

=== Commercial mixtapes ===
List of commercial mixtapes, with selected chart positions
Title	Album details	Peak chart positions		
Title	Album details	US	US R&B/ HH	AUS
King of the Mischievous South, Vol. 2	Released: July 19, 2024; Label: PH, Loma Vista; Formats: CD, LP, cassette, digital download, streaming	81	26	84
Strictly 4 the Scythe	Released: March 6, 2026; Label: PH, Loma Vista; Formats: CD, LP, cassette, digital download, streaming	—	—	91

== Singles ==
=== As lead artist ===
List of singles, with selected chart positions and certifications, showing year released and album name
Title	Year	Peak chart positions				Certifications	Album
Title	Year	US R&B/HH Bub.	US Rap Digital	BEL (FL) Tip	NZ Hot	Certifications	Album
"Threatz" (featuring Yung Simmie and Robb Banks)	2013	—	—	—	—		Nostalgic 64
"Zone 3"	2014	—	—	—	—		Nostalgic 64
"Ice Age" (featuring Mike Dece)	2015	—	—	—	—		32 Zel/Planet Shrooms
"Ultimate"	2015	—	23	—	—	RIAA: Platinum; ARIA: Platinum; RMNZ: Gold	32 Zel/Planet Shrooms
"Flying Nimbus" (featuring Lofty305)	2016	—	—	—	—		Non-album single
"Knotty Head" (featuring Rick Ross)	2016	—	—	—	—		Imperial
"ULT"	2016	—	—	—	—		Imperial
"Gook"	2016	—	—	—	—		Imperial
"Zenith" (featuring Joey Bada$$)	2016	—	—	—	—		Imperial
"Ultimate" / "Sick & Tired" (featuring BadBadNotGood)	2017	—	—	—	—		Non-album singles
"Skywalker"	2017	—	—	—	—		Non-album singles
"Uh Huh" (with IDK)	2018	—	—	—	—		Non-album singles
"Sumo"	2018	—	—	—	—		Ta13oo
"Percs"	2018	—	—	—	—		Ta13oo
"Clout Cobain"	2018	6	—	—	—	RIAA: Platinum; ARIA: Platinum; MC: Platinum; RMNZ: Gold	Ta13oo
"Vengeance" (featuring JPEGMafia and ZillaKami)	2018	—	—	—	—		Ta13oo
"Aloha" (with Charlie Heat)	2019	—	—	—	—		Fireworks
"Black Balloons" (featuring Twelve'len and GoldLink)	2019	—	—	—	—	ARIA: Gold	Ta13oo
Bulls on Parade (triple j Like A Version)	2019	—	—	—	—		Non-album single
"Ricky"	2019	—	—	43	—	RIAA: Gold; ARIA: Platinum; MC: Gold; RMNZ: Gold	Zuu
"Speedboat"	2019	—	—	—	—		Zuu
"Shawshank" (featuring Tate Kobang)	2019	—	—	—	—		Madden NFL 20 soundtrack
"Psycho" (with Slowthai)	2019	—	—	—	—		Non-album single
"Lemonade" (with Yungblud)	2020	—	—	—	—		A Weird! AF Halloween
"Live from the Abyss"	2020	—	—	—	—		Non-album singles
"Bruuuh" (Remix) (with J.I.D)	2021	—	—	—	—		Non-album singles
"Bad Luck" (featuring PlayThatBoiZay)	2021	—	—	—	—		Dark Nights: Death Metal Soundtrack
"The Game"	2021	—	—	—	—		Non-album single
"Walkin" (solo or featuring Key Glock)	2022	—	—	—	—	RIAA: Platinum; ARIA: Gold; MC: Gold; RMNZ: Gold	Melt My Eyez See Your Future
"Zatoichi" (featuring Slowthai)	2022	—	—	—	—		Melt My Eyez See Your Future
"Troubles" (featuring T-Pain)	2022	—	—	—	37		Melt My Eyez See Your Future
"Let It All Hang Out" (featuring PlayThatBoiZay)	2022	—	—	—	—		Elvis (Original Motion Picture Soundtrack)
"Talk About Me" (with Dot da Genius, Kid Cudi, and JID)	2022	—	—	—	—		Non-album singles
"Blood on My Nikez" (featuring Juicy J)	2023	—	—	—	—		Non-album singles
"Ice Cold Zel Freestyle" (featuring Icecoldbishop)	2023	—	—	—	—		Non-album singles
"Hot One" (featuring TiaCorine and ASAP Ferg)	2024	—	—	—	30		King of the Mischievous South, Vol. 2
"Black Flag Freestyle" (featuring That Mexican OT)	2024	—	—	—	—		King of the Mischievous South, Vol. 2
"Hoodlumz" (featuring ASAP Rocky and PlayThatBoiZay)	2024	—	—	—	—		King of the Mischievous South, Vol. 2
"Still in the Paint" (featuring Bktherula and Lazer Dim 700)	2024	—	—	—	39		King of the Mischievous South
"Him"	2025	—	—	—	—		Him
"Lit Effect" (with Bktherula featuring Lazer Dim 700)	2026	—	—	—	—		Strictly 4 the Scythe
"The Scythe" (with TiaCorine and ASAP Ferg)	2026	—	—	—	—		Strictly 4 the Scythe
"Mutt That Bih" (with Key Nyata featuring 1900Rugrat)	2026	—	—	—	—		Strictly 4 the Scythe
"Difference" (with Kenneth Blume featuring Yebba)	2026	—	—	—	—		II
"Gone Fishing" (with Kenneth Blume)	2026	—	—	—	—		II
"—" denotes a recording that did not chart or was not released in that territory.

=== As featured artist ===
Title	Year	Peak chart positions	Certifications	Album
Title	Year	NZ Hot	Certifications	Album
"Chill Bill (Remix)" (Rob $tone featuring DRAM, Denzel Curry and Cousin Stizz)	2016	—		I'm Almost Ready
"Dressed 2 Kill" (J.K. the Reaper featuring Denzel Curry)	2016	—		Non-album singles
"Redemption" (Nell featuring Denzel Curry)	2016	—		Non-album singles
"Du Rags" (Yoshi Thompkins featuring Denzel Curry)	2016	—		Non-album singles
"Pale Fire" (Darnell Williams featuring Denzel Curry and Elohim)	2016	—		Non-album singles
"Cnt U See (Remix)" (Jamie Isaac featuring Denzel Curry and Wiki)	2017	—		Non-album singles
"Raw (Remix)" (Daye Jack featuring Denzel Curry and Grim Dave)	2017	—		Non-album singles
"Babylon" (Ekali featuring Denzel Curry)	2017	—		Non-album singles
"Goldfish" (Billy Davis featuring Denzel Curry)	2017	—		A Family Portrait
"No Wave" (IDK featuring Denzel Curry)	2018	—		Non-album singles
"Kristi Yamagucci" (A$AP Ferg featuring Denzel Curry, IDK and NickNack)	2018	—		Non-album singles
"Please Forgive" (Powers Pleasant featuring Denzel Curry, IDK, Zombie Juice, and ZillaKami)	2018	—		Non-album singles
"Tokyo Drifting" (Glass Animals featuring Denzel Curry)	2019	40	RIAA: Gold; ARIA: Platinum	Dreamland
"Poison Klan" (PlayThatBoiZay featuring Denzel Curry and Anonymuz)	2019	—		Nocturnal
"No Mercy" (Melodownz featuring Denzel Curry)	2019	19		Non-album singles
"Pig Feet" (Terrace Martin featuring Denzel Curry, Daylyt, G Perico, and Kamasi Washington)	2020	—		Non-album singles
"Bald! Remix" (JPEGMafia featuring Denzel Curry)	2020	—		LP!
"Bandz" (Destructo featuring Yo Gotti, Kevin Gates, and Denzel Curry)	2020	—		Non-album single
"Lil Scammer That Could" (Guapdad 4000 featuring Denzel Curry)	2020	—		Platinum Falcon Returns
"Bloodrush" (Andrew Broder featuring Denzel Curry, Dua Saleh, and Haleek Maul)	2020	—		Sleeping Car Porters
"Sangria" ($NOT featuring Denzel Curry)	2020	—		Beautiful Havoc
"Fallin' Apart" (Young Franco featuring Denzel Curry and Pell)	2020	—		Non-album singles
"Something in the Water" (Saba featuring Denzel Curry)	2020	—		Non-album singles
"Art of War" (Jasiah featuring Denzel Curry and Rico Nasty)	2021	—		Non-album singles
"Evil Twin" (Powers Pleasant featuring Denzel Curry and Zillakami)	2021	—		Non-album singles
"Burn It All Down" (League of Legends featuring PVRIS and Denzel Curry)	2021	—		Non-album singles
"Lane" (Sampa the Great featuring Denzel Curry and Powers Pleasant)	2022	—		As Above, So Below
"Dog Food" (IDK featuring Denzel Curry)	2022	—		Simple.
"PG Baby" (Remix) (redveil featuring Denzel Curry)	2022	—		Non-album singles
"Shots!" (JELEEL! featuring Denzel Curry)	2022	—		Non-album singles
"Tally" (Midwxst featuring Denzel Curry)	2023	—		Non-album singles
"Goated" (Armani White featuring Denzel Curry)	2023	—		Non-album singles
"Killers and Robbers" (Jasiah featuring midwxst, Denzel Curry, and Matt Ox)	2023	—		3
"Lady Draco" (Twelve'len featuring Denzel Curry)	2023	—		Non-album single
"Reckless" (Hanumankind featuring Denzel Curry)	2025	—		Monsoon Season
"Fake Jeezy" (Maxo Kream featuring Denzel Curry and JPEGMafia)	2026	—		Non-album singles
"Hive Mind" (Knocked Loose featuring Denzel Curry)	2026	—		Non-album singles

=== Promotional singles ===
List of promotional singles, showing year released and album name
Title	Year	Album
"Equalizer" (featuring Ronny J)	2017	13
"Hate Government"	2017	13
"Zeltron 6 Billion" (featuring Lil Ugly Mane)	2017	13
"Cash Maniac" (featuring Nyyjerya)	2018	Ta13oo

== Other charted songs ==
List of other charted songs, with selected chart positions, showing year released and album name
Title	Year	Peak chart positions	Album
Title	Year	NZ Hot	Album
"Zuu"	2019	21	Zuu
"Wish" (featuring Kiddo Marv)	2019	26	Zuu
"Birdz" (featuring Rick Ross)	2019	28	Zuu
"Automatic" (with Tay Keith)	2019	25	Zuu
"What I Please" (Smokepurpp featuring Denzel Curry)	2019	30	Deadstar 2
"Take_it_Back_v2" (with Kenny Beats)	2020	29	Unlocked
"Diet_" (with Kenny Beats)	2020	28	Unlocked
"Lay_Up.m4a" (with Kenny Beats)	2020	40	Unlocked
"Dynasties & Dystopia" (with Gizzle and Bren Joy)	2021	24	Arcane
"Melt Session #1" (featuring Robert Glasper)	2022	29	Melt My Eyez See Your Future
"Worst Comes to Worst"	2022	38	Melt My Eyez See Your Future
"Ain't No Way" (featuring 6lack, Rico Nasty, JID and Jasiah)	2022	27	Melt My Eyez See Your Future
"Black Flag Freestyle" (featuring That Mexican OT)	2024	40	King of the Mischievous South Vol. 2
"Hoodlumz" (featuring ASAP Rocky and PlayThatBoiZay)	2024	38	King of the Mischievous South Vol. 2

== Guest appearances ==
List of guest appearances, with other performing artists, showing year released and album name
Title	Year	Artist(s)	Album
"Chop 'Em Up"	2012	Propr Boyz	Prxpr Bxyz
"Magnificent"	2012	Propr Boyz	Prxpr Bxyz
"KLVN SHXT"	2012	Propr Boyz, Yung Simmie	Prxpr Bxyz
"Wave Cap"	2012	Metro Zu, Jarret	Mink Rug
"Drogas"	2012	Mike Dece, Lofty305, Speak	1996
"Twistin"	2012	Lil Ugly Mane	Mista Thug Isolation
"S.O.S. (1995) Fatality Edition"	2012	Lil Champ Fway, DoughDoughDaDon, Harvey G, Young Renegade	Neighborhood Superstar Est. 1999
"Po$h Rvidxrz"	2012	Metro Zu	Heaven
"Posh Rvidxrz"	2012	Lofty305	Maxine
"Hard AF"	2012	Soulja Mook	M.I.Alien
"I Be Trippin Sometimes"	2012	Soulja Mook	M.I.Alien
"Outro"	2012	Soulja Mook, Pouya, Lofty305, Yung Raw, SpaceGhostPurrp	M.I.Alien
"D'Evilz"	2012	Yung Raw	The Trill OG
"Gankin"	2012	J.K. The Rapper	Ill Life
"Dusty Elbow Pimptro"	2012	Lofty305	Ratchet Hipstr
"Dusty Elbow Pimpterlude"	2012	Lofty305	Ratchet Hipstr
"Dusty Elbow Pimpin Ass Outro"	2012	Lofty305	Ratchet Hipstr
"From the South"	2012	†JGRXXN†	Fvck Mainstream Codeine Funk
"Slow Jam Phunk"	2012	Niko Javan, Lofty305, Robert Bare	Perfection
"ShakeDown"	2012	Harvey G	Death Before Dishonor
"Daughters of Satan (SlowStikk)"	2012	lowa letta, Ruben Slikk	CougarKINGtropolis
"Break Yo Self"	2012	N3ll, R3ll, Willow	90s Mentality '94
"Back in Da Dayz"	2012	N3ll, R3ll	90s Mentality '94
"Warning"	2012	IndigoChildRick	Indigo
"2.7.5. Family"	2013	Yung Simmie	Basement Musik
"Black Raven Phonk"	2013	Yung Simmie	Basement Musik
"IndigoB"	2013	SDotBraddy, Pouya	Warbucks
"Bow Down"	2014	Deniro Farrar	Rebirth
"Darius"	2014	SDotBraddy	Private Sessions
"Eyes of the World"	2014	Dillon Cooper	X:XX
"Can't Tell Me Shit (Remix)"	2014	SDotBraddy	Non-album single
"Lord Vader Kush"	2015	Ruben Slikk	Turd Fighter
"Lane 2 Lane"	2015	DJ EFN	Another Time
"Grotto Flow"	2015	Yung Simmie	Yung Smokey
"Spice Girls"	2015	Pouya, SDotBraddy	South Side Slugs
"Pray for Me"	2015	Lofty305 & F1LTHY	Elise
"The Federation"	2015	Mike Dece	Rich Slut
"Shoot da 3"	2016	Yung Simmie	Simmie Season
"Ultimate $uicide"	2016	Suicideboys	Eternal Grey
"Gunsmoke"	2016	Promnite	Snake Charmer
"Alakazam"	2017	AJ Tracey, Jme	Secure the Bag!
"In a Grave"	2017	Show Me the Body, Eartheater, Moor Mother	Corpus I
"Too Many"	2017	Juicy J, Wiz Khalifa	Rubba Band Business
"The Glory"	2018	Flatbush Zombies	Vacation in Hell
"Elevate"	2018	DJ Khalil, YBN Cordae, Swavay, Trevor Rich	Spider-Man: Into the Spider-Verse
"Glacier"	2018	RONNY J	OMGRONNY
"Houston"	2018	RONNY J	OMGRONNY
"Kill Us All"	2018	The Neighborhood	Hard to Imagine The Neighbourhood Ever Changing
"This Changes Everything"	2019	Robert Glasper, Buddy, Terrace Martin, James Poyser	Fuck Yo Feelings
"Count My Blessings"	2019	Anna Wise	As If It Were Forever
"One Punch Man"	2019	Higher Brothers, Ski Mask the Slump God	Five Stars
"No Threat"	2019	Anonymuz	There Is No Threat
"Sunday Service (VANDALIZED EDIT)"	2019	Jarreau Vandal	Non-album single
"Black Balloons Reprise"	2019	Flying Lotus	Flamagra
"Running the Streets"	2019	Rick Ross, A Boogie Wit Da Hoodie	Port of Miami 2
"Grim"	2019	Wiki, Lil Ugly Mane	Oofie
"Draino"	2019	City Morgue	City Morgue Vol 2: As Good as Dead
"Izayah"	2019	Guapdad 4000, Key!, Maxo Kream, Kenny Beats	Dior Deposits
"Got My Back"	2020	Rimon	I Shine, U Shine
"I'm Him"	2020	Smokepurpp	Florida Jit
"Bulletproof"	2020	IDK, Maxo Kream	IDK & Friends 2 (Basketball County Soundtrack)
"Take Care In Your Dreaming"	2020	The Avalanches, Tricky, Sampa the Great	We Will Always Love You
"Think They Are"	2020	Jackboy	Love Me While I'm Here
"Bad Day"	2021	Nyck Caution	Anywhere But Here
"A+"	2021	Kenny Mason	Angelic Hoodrat: Supercut
"Terms"	2021	Slowthai, Dominic Fike	Tyron
"Wig Split"	2021	Pouya	Blood Was Never Thick As Water
"African Samurai"	2021	Flying Lotus	Yasuke
"Bleach"	2021	ZillaKami	DOG BOY
"Lost Souls"	2022	Meechy Darko, Busta Rhymes	Gothic Luxury
"Ultra GriZelda"	2023	Westside Gunn	And Then You Pray for Me
"First Night"	2024	Lyrical Lemonade, Teezo Touchdown, Juicy J, Cochise, Lil B	All Is Yellow
"DBZ"	2024	Your Old Droog, Method Man, Madlib	Movie
"JPEGUltra!"	2024	JPEGMafia	I Lay Down My Life for You
"Bandoe"	2024	Powers Pleasant, Meechy Darko, Soulja Livin' Tru	Life Sucks
"From the South"	2024	Nell	The Black Tape
"Murda Gardens"	2024	PlayThatBoiZay	Vampires Impersonating People
"Ratatat"	2024	PlayThatBoiZay, 03 Greedo	Vampires Impersonating People
"Fallin' Apart"	2025	Young Franco, Pell	It's Franky Baby!
"Reckless"	2025	Hanumankind	Monsoon Season
"Unmask"	2025	Ski Mask the Slump God, Craig Xen	The Lost Files
"Achieve It"	2025	Juicy J	Swivel
"Blocka Blocka"	2025	That Mexican OT	Recess
"We on Go II"	2025	Bia, ASAP Ferg	Bianca
"Focus on Me"	2025	ASAP Ferg	Flip Phone Shorty - Strictly for Da Streetz Vol. 1
"Young OG"	2025	ASAP Ferg	Flip Phone Shorty - Strictly for Da Streetz Vol. 1
"Ice"	2025	Black Fortune	Road to Osshland II
"Fat Raps 4"	2025	King Chip, Larry June, MGK	Rapping Paper (Gift Raps 2)
"Fake Jeezy"	2026	Maxo Kream, JPEGMafia	Non-album single
"House Money"	2026	Baby Keem, Kendrick Lamar	Ca$ino

== Music videos ==
=== As lead artist ===
List of music videos, with directors, showing year released
Title	Year	Director(s)
"S.4.M.R"	2012	Pouya
"Threatz"	2013	Unkleluc and FXRBES
"Zone 3"	2014	Jeremy Wirth and Dan Ruth
"Ice Age"	2015	Unkleluc and Julian Yuri
"Flying Nimbus"	2016	Unkleluc
"ULT"	2016	David Wept and FXRBES
"Gook"	2016	JMP Visuals
"Zenith"	2016	JMP Visuals
"Shoot Da 3" (with Yung Simmie)	2016	Roberto Mario
"Knotty Head (UK Remix)"	2016	Denzel Curry
"This Life"	2017	JMP Visuals
"Goodnight"	2017	David Wept
"No Wave" (with IDK)	2018	Unknown
"Clout Cobain"	2018	Zev Deans
"Vengeance"	2018	Zev Deans
"Ultimate"	2019	Mike Piscitelli
"Black Balloons"	2019	Zev Deans
"Ricky"	2019	Twelve'len
"Speedboat"	2019	Jaimie Sanchez
"Psycho" (with Slowthai)	2019	Duncan Loudon
"Unlocked" (with Kenny Beats)	2020	Jack Begert and Christian Sutton
"Pig Feet" (with Terrace Martin, Daylyt, Kamasi Washington, and G Perico)	2020	Brendan Walter & Jasper Graham
"Walkin"	2022	Adrian Villagomez
"Zatoichi" (with Slowthai)	2022	Adrian Villagomez
"Troubles" (with T-Pain)	2022	Adrian Villagomez
"X-Wing"	2022	Adrian Villagomez

=== As featured artist ===
List of music videos, with directors, showing year released
Title	Year	Other artist(s)	Director(s)
"Please Forgive"	2018	Powers Pleasant, IDK, ZillaKami, Zombie Juice	Lonewolf
"Once Upon A Time"	2019	IDK	The Ocean I Am
"Poison Klan"	2019	PlayThatBoiZay, Anonymuz	Unkleluc, Fxrbes
"Black Balloons Reprise"	2019	Flying Lotus	Jack Begert
"Tokyo Drifting"	2019	Glass Animals	Rubberband
"What I Please"	2020	Smokepurpp	Unkleluc
"Bald! Remix"	2020	JPEGMafia	JPEGMafia
"Wig Split"	2021	Pouya	Davie Medina
"Talk About Me"	2022	Dot da Genius, JID, Kid Cudi	Cole Bennett
"Fake Jeezy"	2026	Maxo Kream, JPEGMafia	Oakmobb and Jack Rottier
"Hive Mind"	2026	Knocked Loose	Eric Richter and Bryan Garris
