= II (Denzel Curry and Kenneth Blume album) =

2026 collaborative album by Denzel Curry and Kenneth Blume

Studio album by Denzel Curry and Kenneth Blume
- Released: August 21, 2026
- Genres: Boom bap; jazz rap
- Length: 24:07
- Labels: PH; Loma Vista
- Producers: Kenneth Blume; Paul Castelluzzo; J.Robb; Ray Mason; Leon Michels; Nick Movshon; Homer Steinweiss

Denzel Curry and Kenneth Blume chronology
Unlocked 1.5 (2021)	II (2026)

Denzel Curry chronology
Strictly 4 the Scythe (2026)	II (2026)

Kenneth Blume chronology
Fathers (2026)	II (2026)

Singles from II
- 1. "Difference" Released: August 12, 2026

II (stylized in lowercase; also known as Unlocked II) is the debut collaborative studio album by American rapper Denzel Curry and record producer Kenneth Blume. It was released through PH and Loma Vista Recordings on August 21, 2026. It serves as a follow up to their collaborative extended play (EP), Unlocked (2020). In promotion of the project, the two released the single "Difference" and are set to go on a North American tour from September to November 2026.

A boom bap and jazz rap album, II was produced and recorded with only an SP-404 and a cheap microphone, and featured guest appearances from JPEGMafia, Westside Gunn, and Yebba. Compared to the original EP, it presents a more finalized and polished structure, with Curry's lyrical ability defined throughout the album and an emphasis on samples, particularly from soul music.

II generally received positive reviews from music critics, praising Curry's lyricism, Blume's sample-based production, and the duo's chemistry, with one considering the project to stand out compared to most rapper-producer pairings. Commercially, the album appeared on the North American College and Community Radio chart, as well as album charts from Australia, New Zealand, and Portugal.

== Background ==
In 2020, Denzel Curry and Kenneth Blume (then known as Kenny Beats) released the collaborative extended play (EP), Unlocked. Released without a prior announcement, the project was recorded in a three-day studio session, following Curry's appearance on Kenny Beats' YouTube series, The Cave. It received critical acclaim from music critics and was accompanied with an animated short film. The following year, Curry and Blume released the remix extended play (EP), Unlocked 1.5, which features guest appearances from Smino, Joey Badass, and Benny the Butcher.

Following the release of Unlocked, Curry went on to release two studio albums—Melt My Eyez See Your Future (2022) and King of the Mischievous South Vol. 2 (2024)—with both receiving positive reviews from music critics. Blume also went on the produce for bands such as Idles, Fcukers, Geese, and Weezer, while collaborating with Rico Nasty on their joint project—RX— and release the collaborative album—Fathers (2026)—with musicians Nate Smith, Carrtoons, and Kiefer. In 2026, Curry collaborated with Knocked Loose on "Hive Mind", released the collaborative album—Strictly 4 the Scythe—with a rap supergroup the Scythe, performed at Fred Again's concerts in New York City, and supported Deftones during the European leg of their tour.

== Music and lyrics ==
=== Overview ===
II is a boom bap and jazz rap album with a running time of 24 minutes. The album features guest appearances from JPEGMafia, Westside Gunn, and Yebba, and deviates from the original EP due to its more finalized and polished structure." On the other hand, both share similarities as II emphasizes Curry's lyricism compared to his other projects, where he raps about various topics, sings along to samples, and details his stage in life. Curry's "double-time flows and zany one-liners" remain persistent throughout the album. The Michigan Daily's Nathaniel Evans highlighted it as his first attempt on a "bars only" album.

The album marks a stylistic shift following Curry's two Southern hip-hop-based projects. The production of II provides an emphasis on samples, particularly from soul music. Pitchfork writer Olivier Lafontant described the album's beats as similar to the style of MF Doom and Madlib, filled with loops, muffled boom bap drums, and vocal samples. Treble's Laura D. Flowers characterized it as sounding similar to RZA's production and the Beastie Boys' collage-based album Paul's Boutique (1989). During the production of II, Curry and Blume got into personal disputes over the project before simplifying its production, using only an SP-404 and a cheap microphone.

=== Tracks ===
"Gone Fishing", with "jazzy guitar licks", begins the album with Curry evaluating his music career, "wide-eyed and full of zeal". He shows indifference towards status or stature, shrugging with the line "A history of hits, but for you it's not hitting." Robin Murray of Clash described the track as showing a "punk-like sense of defiance as they up-end norms, and confound fans." "Evil Grin" features a "cartoonishly outlandish" verse from fellow rapper JPEGMafia. Fantano favorably compared the track to JPEGMafia and Curry's collaboration on the former's album I Lay Down My Life for You (2024). "Candlelight" features "stabby Indonesian rock inclusions", with Curry "singing along with it goofily" by the conclusion of the track. "Product" shows off Curry's "slippery, Twista-type staccato", rapping about overseeing vultures "fiending for a come-up" with themes based on money and capitalism. The track uses a woman's voice that sings "in my life", referring to people who want to chase Curry's success out of economic hardship.

"UPS" carries a "lilting swagger" throughout the track, where Curry refers to himself as a villain. "Benjamin" carries similar themes to "Product", where he "laments time being honey" along with various topics. Through a soul sample, despite its dedication as a "scatching diss" towards PlayThatBoyZay, "Cold Night in Hell" feature Curry rapping about his celebration of success while reflecting on his legacy and future, boasting that he's "not a celebrity" but a "psycho with a microphone". The track also features a lyrical reference to his dad Ricky. "Crown" highlights rapper Westside Gunn's "virulent grit and opulence". Fantano characterized the track's beat as a "nasty piece of boom bap with some chipmunk soul vocal samples" and Wu-Tang Clan vibes. "Difference" is described by Stereogum writer Tom Breihan as a "cluttered, energetic boom-bap track" with Curry in "fired-up but technically precise form." Containing political undertones, Curry reflects on the "economic asymmetry" in hip-hop that he finds himself in. In addition, the track features a hook from singer Yebba.

== Release and promotion ==
On August 11, 2026, Curry and Blume teased a sequel to Unlocked with a video of themselves walking through the mountains, while talking about their legacy and impact. The project was officially announced under the title II the following day, with a release date of August 21. The same day of the album's announcement, they released its lead single "Difference" with an accompanied music video featuring Yebba. The music video showcases a "crackly VHS-style split-screen" of Curry and Blume starting their days.

In promotion of the album, Curry is set to embark on a concert tour, which is set to begin on September 26, in Newport and conclude on November 13, in Springfield. Physical sales for II were also made available, including limited edition "galaxy colored" and "gatefold picture disc" vinyl, CD, and orange cassette. Additional merchandise includes shirts, a puzzle set, vinyl slip mat, cap, keychain, hoodie, beanie, and thermal. The album was released by PH and Loma Vista on August 21.

== Reception ==
Professional ratings
Review scores
Source	Rating
Clash	8/10
The Needle Drop	8/10 (Note: Specifically, Fantano rated it a "light eight".)
Pitchfork	5.9/10

II received generally positive reviews from music critics. Robin Murray of Clash characterized II as a "phenomenal hip-hop rollercoaster rise", considering it to be cohesive as a whole and to contain "endless replay value." He praised Curry's "explosive flows" and Blume's "luminescent beats", concluding that the album felt like "two generational artists throwing down the gauntlet to their peers." Treble's Laura D. Flowers similarly commended the album as having earned "an extended victory lap" for Curry.

The Needle Drop critic Anthony Fantano complimented the duo's loose and carefree approach on II, seeing it as a "very enjoyable and very praise-worthy project". He described Curry's creative approach to the album as coming from a "lot of passion, and a lot of hunger, and something to say." David Rodriquez of Everything is Noise noted Curry's lyricism and maturity on the album, along with Blume's "sensibilities with ridiculous bounce and classically-tuned smoothness". Wonderland considered II to be "one of the best hip-hop projects of the year to date."

Nathaniel Evans of The Michigan Daily noted the duo's chemistry as the highlight of the album, stating that their synergy "puts most rapper-producer pairings to shame." However, Pitchfork writer Olivier Lafontant gave a more critical review of II, considering the album as less dynamic compared to the original EP. He considered Curry's rapping style to feel "tame and predictable" and described the samples as sounding like they "were plucked from YouTube playlists with tens of thousands of likes on them". He also compared the album unfavorably to MF Doom's Mm..Food (2004) and Quasimoto's The Unseen (2000).

Commercially, II debuted and peaked at number 172 on the North American College and Community Radio chart on the week of September 1, 2026, and peaked at number nine on its hip-hop chart within two weeks. Internationally, the album peaked at number nine on the Australian Hip Hop/R&B Albums chart, as well as number 52 on the country's main album chart. It also peaked at number 40 on New Zealand Albums and number 188 on Portuguese Albums.

== Track listing ==
Tracks are produced by Kenneth Blume, except where listed.

II track listing
No.	Title	Writer(s)	Producer(s)	Length
1.	"Gone Fishing"	Kenneth Blume; Denzel Curry; Björn Gislason; Raymond Scott		2:04
2.	"Evil Grin" (featuring JPEGMafia)	Blume; Curry; Barrington Hendricks; Paul Castelluzzo; Leon Michels; Nick Movshon; Homer Steinweiss; Ray Mason	Blume; Castelluzzo; Michels; Movshon; Steinweiss; Mason	2:22
3.	"Candlelight"	Blume; Curry; Hendricks; Benny Soebardja; Janko Nilovic		2:46
4.	"Product"	Blume; Curry; Steinweiss; Matthew Cassell		2:45
5.	"UPS"	Blume; Curry; Onaje Gumbs	Blume; J.Robb	2:22
6.	"Benjamin"	Blume; Curry		2:29
7.	"Cold Night in Hell"	Blume; Curry; Ian Curnow; Paul Lewis; Rick Asikpo		3:27
8.	"Crown" (featuring Westside Gunn)	Blume; Curry; Alvin Worthy; Leroy Burgess; Patrick Adams; Russell Patterson; Stuart Bascombe		3:04
9.	"Difference" (featuring Yebba)	Blume; Curry; Abigail Smith; Gislason		2:48
Total length:				24:07

== Personnel ==
Credits are adapted from Tidal.

- Denzel Curry – executive production
- Kenneth Blume – engineering, executive production
- Nathan Burgess – mixing
- Ruairi O'Flaherty – mastering

== Charts ==
Chart performance for II
Chart (2026)	Peak position
Australian Albums (ARIA)	52
Australian Hip Hop/R&B Albums (ARIA)	9
New Zealand Albums (RMNZ)	40
Portuguese Albums (AFP)	188
US & Canadian College Radio Top 200 (NACC)	172
US & Canadian College Radio Top 30 Hip Hop (NACC)	9
