= 13lood 1n + 13lood Out Mixx =

Recording by Denzel Curry
- Released: January 6, 2020
- Recorded: 2015–2019
- Genre: Industrial hip-hop; hardcore hip-hop; trap metal
- Length: 12:57

Denzel Curry chronology
Zuu (2019)	13lood 1n + 13lood Out Mixx (2020)	Unlocked (2020)

13lood 1n + 13lood Out Mixx (stylized as 13LOOD 1N + 13LOOD OUT MIXX) is a DJ mix by American rapper Denzel Curry. It was released on January 6, 2020. The project was initially premiered as a single continuous track on Curry's official YouTube channel.

The project features guest appearances from Ghostemane, ZillaKami of City Morgue, Xavier Wulf, and AK of the Underachievers. The visualizer for the video was directed by Zev Deans.

== Background ==
Denzel teased the name of the project and the cover art in 2018 without any context. Following the release of Zuu in May 2019, 13lood 1n + 13lood Out was released as a surprise drop, containing songs that didn't make the cut for his last three studio albums, Imperial, Ta13oo and Zuu. The project is produced and mixed in the style of trap metal and industrial hip-hop. The title and formatting of the tracklist utilize a similar aesthetic to his album Ta13oo.

== Reception ==
Professional ratings
Review scores
Source	Rating
StereoVision	9/10 stars
HipHopDX	4/5 stars

Critical reception was generally favorable. Carter Fife of StereoVision commented that the project "is definitely meant for lovers of the intensity found in 2017's 13 EP". Josh Svetz of HipHopDX gave the project four out of five stars.

== Tracklist ==
13lood 1n + 13lood Out Mixx track listing
No.	Title	Length
1.	"Intro"	1:17
2.	"Charlie Sheen" (featuring Ghostemane)	1:44
3.	"Evil Twin" (featuring ZillaKami)	1:34
4.	"Welcome to the Future" (featuring Xavierwulf)	1:47
5.	"False Gods Freestyle"	1:11
6.	"Pxsh6xd Shxt"	1:20
7.	"No Pen No Pad"	1:52
8.	"Gogeta" (featuring AKTHESAVIOR)	2:12
Total length:		12:57

Notes

- All tracks are stylized in all caps.
