= Melt My Eyez See Your Future =

Studio album by Denzel Curry
- Released: March 25, 2022
- Recorded: 2019–2021
- Genre: Hip-hop
- Length: 45:10
- Label: PH; Loma Vista
- Producer: Cardo; Clutch George; Darko; DJ Khalil; Dot da Genius; Drtwrk; Elijah Fox; FnZ; HWLS; JGramm; Jonnywood; JPEGMafia; Kal Banx; Karriem Riggins; Kenny Beats; Mickey de Grand IV; Mike Hector; Naz; Noah Goldstein; Powers Pleasant; Robert Glasper; Thundercat

Denzel Curry chronology
Unlocked 1.5 (2021)	Melt My Eyez See Your Future (2022)	King of the Mischievous South Vol. 2 (2024)

"The Extended Edition" cover

Singles from Melt My Eyez See Your Future
- 1. "Walkin" Released: January 24, 2022; 2. "Zatoichi" Released: February 24, 2022; 3. "Troubles" Released: March 21, 2022

Melt My Eyez See Your Future is the fifth studio album by American rapper Denzel Curry, released through PH and Loma Vista Recordings on March 25, 2022. The album includes features from Robert Glasper, Buzzy Lee, Saul Williams, Bridget Perez, T-Pain, 6lack, Rico Nasty, JID, Jasiah, 454, and Slowthai, and production from Cardo, FnZ, Thundercat, JPEGMafia, and Kenny Beats, among others. It was preceded by the singles "Walkin", "Zatoichi", and "Troubles". The album received widespread acclaim from critics, with reviewers praising Curry's lyrical abilities and the album's production.

== Background, promotion, and release ==
Denzel Curry first began envisioning the album's themes in 2018, and began working on it after the completion of his 2019 album, Zuu. In a May 2020 interview with XXL, he shared his plans to retire from making music after releasing three more full-length bodies of work. His first collaboration extended play with Kenny Beats, Unlocked, was released on February 7, 2020, followed by a remixed version of the EP, titled Unlocked 1.5, on March 5, 2021. He revealed the album title in a November 2021 interview with Las Vegas Weekly. Melt My Eyez is a metaphor for people's tendency to avoid facing difficult topics in day-to-day life, while See Your Future is motivation for moving on by putting one's past behind and focusing on what's yet to come. The album's themes were also inspired by several classic works of cinema, including the Dollars trilogy, The Mandalorian, Return of the Jedi, Sanjuro, Yojimbo, Seven Samurai, and Ran.

It is said to be his most mature body of work yet. He talked about retiring some of his past alter egos in favor of embracing his true personality and feelings through the music: "I'm not trying to be Zeltron. I'm not trying to be Aquarius Killa. I'm not trying to be Raven Miyagi. I'm not trying to be any of those personalities or any of those people. I'm Denzel. I'm a human being. I have feelings." He intended for the album to go in an entirely different direction from his previous works, calling it "the end of an era" and telling fans they were not going to "hear the same type of Denzel anymore".

Curry announced the album on January 5, 2022, by sharing a "Western-style" teaser trailer to his official YouTube channel. The short trailer depicts Curry walking through a desert alone while an appropriate instrumental plays, before displaying a list of people who are featured or have worked on the album, among them: T-Pain, Rico Nasty, JID, Slowthai, Thundercat, Robert Glasper, Karriem Riggins, and Dot da Genius. On January 24, the single "Walkin" was released, along with a similarly Western- and sci-fi-inspired music video directed by Adrian Villagomez. That same day, Curry announced a North American and European tour with special guests Kenny Mason, Mike Dimes, Redveil, and PlayThatBoiZay. On February 24, another single—"Zatoichi" featuring Slowthai, titled after the Japanese fictional character—was released, also accompanied by a music video directed by Villagomez. On March 18, Curry revealed the album was to be released on March 25. On March 21, a third single—"Troubles" featuring T-Pain—was released, along with a music video starring the two. The album was released on March 25, 2022.

=== Extended edition ===
On June 1, 2022, a remix of "Walkin" featuring Key Glock, was released as the first single for the extended version of the album. On September 30, 2022, the extended edition was released featuring 10 new songs recorded by Curry and the Cold Blooded Soul Band, as well as two previously unreleased songs— "Larger Than Life" and "Chrome Hearts" (featuring Zacari). The album was promoted with a livestream concert: Melt My Eyez: Live From the Komodo City Cafe, on September 29.

== Critical reception ==
Professional ratings
Aggregate scores
Source	Rating
AnyDecentMusic?	8.3/10
Metacritic	85/100
Review scores
Source	Rating
AllMusic	4/5 stars
Beats Per Minute	83%
Clash	9/10
DIY	5/5 stars
Dork	4/5 stars
HipHopDX	3.7/5
Kerrang!	4/5
The Line of Best Fit	8/10
NME	5/5 stars
Pitchfork	7.3/10

Melt My Eyez See Your Future was met with widespread critical acclaim. At Metacritic, which assigns a normalized rating out of 100 to reviews from professional publications, the album received an average score of 85, based on eight reviews. Aggregator AnyDecentMusic? gave it 8.3 out of 10, based on their assessment of the critical consensus.

Robin Murray of Clash described the album as a "breathless, breath-taking experience" and awarded it a score of nine out of ten. Kyann-Sian Williams of NME gave it five out of five stars, calling Curry "the Renaissance man of Southern hip-hop" and praising his ability to "[provide] a priceless sense of self-discovery as he explores his countless facets." David Crone of AllMusic applauded Curry's "reflections on past misdoings [...] while his verses are packed with slick wordplay." Alisdair Grice of DIY said, "It feels like an album not caught in time, instead spanning and encompassing it". Alex Nguyen from Beats Per Minute enjoyed the album, saying, "Melt My Eyez See Your Future is a profound exploration of the state of the world and Curry himself. He works with a diverse set of producers and collaborators to transform his sound and incorporates the aesthetics of Westerns and the samurai films that inspired them to disclose his inner feelings and personality". Blaise Radley of Dork said, "Taken as a whole, this is the sort of cohesive artistic statement he's been aching to make for years". Reviewing the album for HipHopDX, Ben Brutocao stated, "It's not an ambitious but heavy-handed declaration of truth (Ta13oo), nor is it an all-encompassing love letter to his home state (Zuu). It's just a rap album, albeit a very good one, and it shows just how dynamic and forceful Denzel Curry can be when he releases himself from the poisonous burden of perfection".

Kerrang! critic Emma Wilkes said, "While this record isn't going to lure rock purists out of their dens, it has greater ambitions in mind, and the amount it achieves in the space that it does is staggering. For any artist of any genre, this is the textbook for innovation". Writing for The Line of Best Fit, Steven Loftin stated, "An exploration of his wildest ideas and most focused inner thoughts, Melt My Eyez See Your Future comes together like a cataclysmic showing of everything he's learned, and most importantly, he's embracing himself". In a positive review, Pitchfork's Steven Kearse said, "On Melt My Eyez See Your Future, Curry again retools his sound, trading livewire energy for introspection and vulnerability. The album lacks the vividness of his past releases, but its concept offers a glimpse into Curry's roving mind".

=== Year-end lists ===
Select year-end rankings of Melt My Eyez See Your Future
Critic/Publication	List	Rank	Ref.
Beats Per Minute	BPM's Top 50 Albums of 2022	26	
Complex	The Best Albums of 2022	10	
Consequence	Top 50 Albums of 2022	43	
Kerrang!	The 50 Best Albums of 2022	22	
The Line of Best Fit	The Best Albums of 2022 Ranked	18	
Loud and Quiet	Loud and Quiet Albums of the Year 2022	35	
NME	The 50 Best Albums of 2022	22	
Okayplayer	Okayplayer's 22 Best Albums of 2022	11	
PopMatters	The 80 Best Albums of 2022	35	
Spectrum Culture	Top 20 Albums of 2022	14	

== Commercial performance ==
Melt My Eyez See Your Future debuted at number 51 on the US Billboard 200, and number 23 on the Top R&B/Hip-Hop Albums chart.

== Track listing ==
Melt My Eyez See Your Future standard edition
No.	Title	Writer(s)	Producer(s)	Length
1.	"Melt Session #1" (featuring Robert Glasper)	Denzel Curry; Robert Glasper; Bridget Perez	Glasper	4:01
2.	"Walkin"	Curry; Kalon Berry; Keith Mansfield	Kal Banx	4:40
3.	"Worst Comes to Worst"	Curry; Oladipo Omishore; Joshua Portillo; Anna Wise; Alain Macklovitch; Bappi Lahiri; Salma Agha	Dot da Genius; Naz	2:50
4.	"John Wayne" (featuring Buzzy Lee)	Curry; Sasha Spielberg; Barrington Hendricks	JPEGMafia	2:36
5.	"The Last"	Curry; Michael Mule; Isaac De Boni; Justin Elwin; Ryan DeGrandy	FnZ; HWLS	4:22
6.	"Mental" (featuring Saul Williams and Bridget Perez)	Curry; Saul Williams; Perez; Julian Gramma; Mike Hector; Elijah Fox	J Gramm; Hector; Fox	2:26
7.	"Troubles" (featuring T-Pain)	Curry; Faheem Najm; Kenneth Blume III; Khalil Abdul Rahman	Kenny Beats; DJ Khalil	2:40
8.	"Ain't No Way" (featuring 6lack, Rico Nasty, JID, Jasiah and Kitty Cash)	Curry; Ricardo Valentine; Maria-Cecilia Kelly; Destin Route; Malachi-Phree Pate; Powers Pleasant; Cachee Livingston; Louis Leibfried; Glasper; Tim Friedrich; Simmie Simms III	Pleasant; Sucuki^{[a]}; Lo^{[a]}	4:24
9.	"X-Wing"	Curry; Michał Suski; George Mardoyan; Julius Herold; Matthew Samuels	Drtwrk; Clutch George; Darko	2:56
10.	"Angelz" (featuring Karriem Riggins)	Curry; Karriem Riggins; Sharina Castillo; DeGrandy; Perez; Mark Ellerbee; Linda Hargrove	Riggins; Mickey de Grand IV	3:51
11.	"The Smell of Death"	Curry; Stephen Bruner	Thundercat	1:20
12.	"Sanjuro" (featuring 454)	Curry; Willie Wilson; Ronald LaTour, Jr.; Berry	Cardo; Kal Banx^{[b]}	2:07
13.	"Zatoichi" (featuring Slowthai)	Curry; Tyron Frampton; Perez; Pleasant; Jonathan Birkner; G. Jacobo; Q. Williams; Richard Spencer	Pleasant; Jonnywood^{[a]}	3:30
14.	"The Ills"	Curry; Noah Goldstein; Omishore; Macklovitch	Goldstein; Dot da Genius	3:22
Total length:				45:10

All tracks on Extended Edition produced by Mickey de Grand IV, except where noted.

Extended edition bonus tracks
No.	Title	Writer(s)	Producer(s)	Length
1.	"Melt Session #1" (Cold Blooded Soul version)	Curry; Glasper; Perez		4:01
2.	"Walkin" (Cold Blooded Soul version)	Curry; Berry; Mansfield		4:40
3.	"Worst Comes to Worst" (Cold Blooded Soul version)	Curry; Omishore; Portillo; Wise; Macklovitch; Lahiri; Agha		2:50
4.	"Mental" (Cold Blooded Soul version)	Curry; Williams; Perez; Gramma; Hector; Fox		2:26
5.	"Troubles" (Cold Blooded Soul version)	Curry; Najm; Blume III; Rahman		2:40
6.	"Chrome Hearts" (featuring Zacari)	Curry; Aaron Booe; Zacari Pacaldo	Aaron Bow; Zacari	4:24
7.	"X-Wing" (Cold Blooded Soul version)	Curry; Suski; Mardoyan; Herold; Samuels		2:56
8.	"Angelz" (Cold Blooded Soul version)	Curry; Riggins; Castillo; DeGrandy; Perez; Ellerbee; Hargrove		3:51
9.	"Larger Than Life"	Curry; Blume III	Kenny Beats; DJ Khalil	1:20
10.	"The Ills" (Cold Blooded Soul version)	Curry; Goldstein; Omishore; Macklovitch		3:22
Total length:				1:15:07

Notes

- ^{^[a]} signifies a co-producer
- ^{^[b]} signifies an additional producer

Sample credits

- "Walkin" contains a sample of "The Loving Touch", written and performed by Keith Mansfield.
- "Worst Comes to Worst" contains a sample of "Come Closer", written by Bappi Lahiri and Salma Agha, as performed by Salma Agha.
- "Angelz" contains a sample of "Nothing Left to Do", written by Mark Ellerbee and Linda Hargrove, as performed by After All.
- "Zatoichi" contains a sample of "Amen, Brother", written by Richard Spencer, as performed by the Winstons.

== Personnel ==
- Denzel Curry – rap vocals
- Chris Gehringer – mastering
- Nathan Burgess – mixing, engineering
- Robert Glasper – keyboards (1), additional keyboards (8)
- Bridget Perez – background vocals (2), additional vocals (10, 13)
- Anna Wise – additional vocals (3)
- A-Trak – sampler (3, 14)
- Buzzy Lee – vocals (4)
- Mickey de Grand IV – additional keyboards (5)
- Sharina Castillo – additional vocals (10)
- Thundercat – additional vocals (11)
- Gaby Duran – additional vocals (13)
- Shawn K – additional vocals (13)

== Charts ==
Chart performance for Melt My Eyez See Your Future
Chart (2022)	Peak position
Australian Albums (ARIA)	12
Belgian Albums (Ultratop Flanders)	62
Canadian Albums (Billboard)	38
Dutch Albums (Album Top 100)	100
Irish Albums (OCC)	48
Lithuanian Albums (AGATA)	36
New Zealand Albums (RMNZ)	17
Scottish Albums (OCC)	7
Swiss Albums (Schweizer Hitparade)	73
UK Albums (OCC)	30
UK Independent Albums (OCC)	13
UK R&B Albums (OCC)	1
US Billboard 200	17
US Top R&B/Hip-Hop Albums (Billboard)	11
