= Unlocked (Denzel Curry and Kenny Beats album) =

2020 studio album by Denzel Curry and Kenny Beats

EP by Denzel Curry and Kenny Beats
- Released: February 7, 2020
- Recorded: 2019
- Genre: Hip hop
- Length: 17:47
- Labels: PH; Loma Vista
- Producer: Kenny Beats

Denzel Curry chronology
13lood 1n + 13lood Out Mixx (2020)	Unlocked (2020)	Unlocked 1.5 (2021)

Kenny Beats chronology
Anger Management (2019)	Unlocked (2020)	Unlocked 1.5 (2021)

Unlocked (stylized in all caps) is a collaborative EP by American rapper Denzel Curry in collaboration with American record producer Kenny Beats. It was released on February 7, 2020, by PH Recordings and Loma Vista Recordings. The album was accompanied by a short film that was released on February 6, 2020.

Unlocked was met with acclaim from music critics, who praised Kenny's production and Curry's songwriting and performance. It peaked at number 100 on the US Billboard 200 and was placed on Spin's mid-year 30 Best Albums of 2020 list.

== Background and recording ==
While Denzel Curry was touring for his 2018 album, Ta13oo, his manager, Mark Maturah, expressed interest in pairing Curry in a recording booth with Kenny Beats. Over a few sessions, the two made two to four songs, but none of the material stood out to Curry or Beats. Curry recalled that "We had a song called 'Spade' that was hard but it wasn’t breaking any boundaries or setting any trends." The two had a feud over one of these beats being used by another artist as it was supposed to be used on Curry's 2019 album, Zuu, causing Curry to hate Kenny for "months".

After some time, people reached out to Curry to have him watch Freddie Gibbs' appearance on The Cave, a bi-weekly freestyle series hosted by and uploaded onto YouTube by Beats. Curry had a positive reaction to the episode's freestyle section and called Kenny Beats, prompting their first dialogue since their aforementioned feud. In August 2019, Denzel Curry appeared on an episode of The Cave and was immediately followed up by the pair recording Unlocked.

The tracklist looking the way it does was both intentional and unintentional. According to Beats, on the last day of recording, the album he opened the project on his iTunes contained unusual signs and symbols on its tracklist. Deciding that this would contribute to the energy and feeling of the project, he and Denzel chose to leave the titles the way they were.

Stereogum and Complex reported that the recording session lasted three days. However, Pitchfork and Consequence of Sound reported that the album's recording took place over a 24-hour period. In an interview with Pigeons & Planes, Kenny Beats mentioned the three day frame of the project's recording, stating "72 hours sounds crazy when you're working at a normal pace but that can happen when someone works as hard as Denzel." Curry mentioned that "Kenny cancelled everybody else’s sessions to dedicate time to this. When you get to Kenny's studio, it's a real vibe. Ain't no fuckery gonna go down in there. He's on go on the keyboard and the pads, and I'm on go with my vocals." In the Pigeons & Planes interview, the duo mentioned Madlib, Stones Throw Records, and the Wu-Tang Clan as influences on the project's sound. Kenny's production on the project was noted by multiple outlets for its inclusion of samples.

The album cover is a homage to the cover for Organized Konfusion's Stress: The Extinction Agenda.

== Release and promotion ==
The album was released on February 7, 2020. While there were no singles released prior to the album, an accompanying short film was released on February 6, 2020. Curry and Kenny Beats intentionally chose to have a lack of singles for the project. Curry stated in a video interview, "there's no singles, like, the project is the single." Going along with this creative choice led the two to develop the concept of an accompanying short film for the project. Deciding on no singles for the project, but still needing to "figure out a way to get people to tune into something long-form", the two engaged in a fake online beef on Instagram Live and Twitter in order to build up hype.

== Reception ==
Professional ratings
Aggregate scores
Source	Rating
Metacritic	81/100
Review scores
Source	Rating
AllMusic	3.5/5 stars
Clash	8/10
Exclaim!	9/10
HipHopDX	4/5
The Line of Best Fit	9/10
Pitchfork	7.2/10

Unlocked was met with critical acclaim. At Metacritic, which assigns a normalized rating out of 100 to reviews from professional publications, the album received an average score of 81, based on 7 reviews. Trey Alston of MTV wrote that "Unlocked (the soundtrack) has eight tracks that range from angry, futuristic screaming bars to mid-'90s, boom-bap, DMX-like snarling that Curry's clearly having a good time doing." Salvatore Maicki of The Fader wrote that Unlocked is "a frenetic and saturated endeavor into two minds at the top of their game," singling out the track "DIET_" as the LP's "most savage peak." Neil Z. Yeung of AllMusic stated that, "the set is a thrill to experience and begs for further collaboration."

Alphonse Pierre of Pitchfork commended Curry's contributions but wrote that Kenny Beats' production work on the album was "too neat." Pierre added:

Unlocked feels like it was made out of convenience—like going to Chipotle instead of the corner Mexican spot because it'll save you 20 minutes. It's good, sure. Curry is rapping his ass off. But Kenny Beats' production isn't anything new. There are no imperfections, no colors outside of the lines, and with that, it misses some of the heart that makes regional rap special.

=== Accolades ===
Accolades for Unlocked
Publication	Accolade	Rank	Ref.
Spin	Spin's 30 Best Albums of 2020 – Mid-Year	N/A	

== Accompanying short film ==
The album was accompanied by a 24-minute short film, which follows the rapper/producer duo on their journey to retrieve the missing Unlocked audio files after they were leaked. Each track from the album is represented by a different visually stylized world in the short film. The film featured both live-action and animated segments. Portions of the animated visuals were done in claymation. Curry stated that he was influenced by various media from his childhood; he expressed wanting to do something "Gorillaz style" for "DIET_". Curry went on to state that Cowboy Bebop served as the base inspiration for the "'Cosmic'.m4a", and that the horror manga Uzumaki influenced the style for "Take_it_Back_v2".

== Track listing ==
All tracks are written by Denzel Curry & Kenny Beats.

Unlocked track listing
No.	Title	Length
1.	"Track 01"	1:29
2.	"Take_it_Back_v2"	2:49
3.	"Lay_Up.m4a"	1:45
4.	"Pyro (leak 2019)"	1:21
5.	"DIET_"	2:23
6.	"So.Incredible.pkg"	3:16
7.	"Track07"	2:03
8.	"'Cosmic'.m4a"	2:46
Total length:		17:47

== Personnel ==
- Denzel Curry – vocals
- Kenny Beats – production, engineering
- Chris Gehringer – mastering
- Nathan Burgess – mixing
- J. Rodriguez – creative direction, design
- Chris Wilson – artwork

== Charts ==
Chart performance for Unlocked
Chart (2020)	Peak position
Australian Albums (ARIA)	33
Australian Hip-Hop/R&B Albums (ARIA)	7
Belgian Albums (Ultratop Flanders)	133
Canadian Albums (Billboard)	82
Irish Albums (IRMA)	87
New Zealand Albums (RMNZ)	38
US Billboard 200	100

== Unlocked 1.5 ==
Unlocked 1.5

Remix album by Denzel Curry and Kenny Beats
- Released: March 5, 2021
- Genre: Hip-hop
- Length: 21:43
- Labels: PH; Loma Vista
- Producers: Kenny Beats; DJ Jahi Sundance; Robert Glasper; Georgia Anne Muldrow; The Alchemist; Charlie Heat; Sango; Jay Versace; GAME666

Denzel Curry chronology
Unlocked (2020)	Unlocked 1.5 (2021)	Melt My Eyez See Your Future (2022)

Kenny Beats chronology
Unlocked (2020)	Unlocked 1.5 (2021)	Louie (2022)

On March 5, 2021, the remix EP Unlocked 1.5 was released, including guest appearances from Smino, Joey Badass, and Benny the Butcher, among others.

Unlocked 1.5 track listing
No.	Title	Producer(s)	Length
1.	"So.Incredible.pkg (Robert Glasper Version)" (featuring Smino and Robert Glasper)	Kenny Beats; DJ Jahi Sundance; Robert Glasper	1:29
2.	"Track07 (Georgia Anne Muldrow Version)" (featuring Arlo Parks)	Georgia Anne Muldrow	2:24
3.	"'Cosmic'.m4a (The Alchemist Version)" (featuring Joey Badass)	The Alchemist; Kenny Beats	2:54
4.	"Take_it_Back_v2 (Charlie Heat Version)"	Charlie Heat	2:51
5.	"Pyro (Sango Leak)" (featuring Kenny Mason)	Sango	2:44
6.	"Lay_Up.m4a (Jay Versace Version)"	Jay Versace	2:05
7.	"DIET_1.5" (featuring Benny the Butcher)	Kenny Beats	2:24
8.	"Take_it_Back_v2 (GODMODE 950 Version)"	GAME666	3:08
Total length:			21:43
