= Ricky (Denzel Curry song) =

Single by Denzel Curry

Single by Denzel Curry

from the album Zuu
- Released: May 8, 2019
- Genre: Hip hop • trap
- Length: 2:27
- Label: PH; Loma Vista
- Songwriters: Denzel Curry; Isaac De Boni; Michael Mule; Gerard Powell II; Luke Blair
- Producer: FnZ

Denzel Curry singles chronology
"Aloha" (2019)	"Ricky" (2019)	"Speedboat" (2019)

Music video
- "Ricky" on YouTube

"Ricky" (stylized in all caps) is a song by American rapper Denzel Curry, released on May 8, 2019 as the lead single from his fourth studio album Zuu (2019). It was produced by FnZ.

== Composition ==
The song's production consists of synths, 808s and "distinctly West Coast-spliced basslines", while lyrically it sees Denzel Curry reflecting on his upbringing, his parents' advice to him, growing up in Carol City, Florida and how they have shaped him into the man he is. He briefly interpolates his song "Parents" from his album Nostalgic 64, while also paying tribute to his father Ricky (whom the song is named after) and his deceased brother Treon.

== Music video ==
The music video was directed by Twelve'len. It features shots of Denzel Curry in a brawl in the MMA fighter Dada 5000's backyard and hanging out with friends.

== Certifications ==
Certifications for "Ricky"
Region	Certification	Certified units/sales
Australia (ARIA)	Platinum	70,000^{‡}
Canada (Music Canada)	Gold	40,000^{‡}
New Zealand (RMNZ)	Gold	15,000^{‡}
United States (RIAA)	Gold	500,000^{‡}
^{‡} Sales+streaming figures based on certification alone.
