= N64 (disambiguation) =

The Nintendo 64 (N64) is a home video game console developed by Nintendo.

N64 may also refer to:

- Maung language
- N64 highway, in the Philippines
- Nebraska Highway 64, in the United States
- "N64", a song by rapper Denzel Curry from his album Nostalgic 64
