= Walkin =

2022 single by Denzel Curry

Single by Denzel Curry

from the album Melt My Eyez See Your Future
- Released: January 24, 2022
- Genre: Conscious hip hop; boom bap; trap
- Length: 4:40
- Label: PH; Loma Vista
- Songwriters: Denzel Curry; Kalon Berry; Keith Mansfield
- Producer: Kal Banx

Denzel Curry singles chronology
"Burn It All Down (Denzel Curry Remix)" (2021)	"Walkin" (2022)	"Zatoichi" (2022)

Music video
- "Walkin" on YouTube

Remix cover
- Cover art of the official remix featuring Key Glock.

"Walkin" is a song by American rapper Denzel Curry, released on January 24, 2022, as the lead single from his fifth studio album Melt My Eyez See Your Future (2022). It was produced by Kal Banx.

== Composition ==
The production in the song changes from the style of boom bap to that of southern rap, juxtaposed with vocals. Lyrically, Denzel Curry raps about the struggles and changing of everyday life as the state of the world is regressing, such as racial and wealth inequality, and striving for success through difficult times, switching his flows as well.

== Music video ==
A music video for the song was directed by Adrian Villagomez and released alongside the single. Taking on a sci-fi western theme, it finds Denzel Curry trekking across a desert planet alone, first walking through a village and moving past barren sand dunes, children playing on a swing set, and villains trying to kill him. He collapses on his knees several times throughout the journey. In the end, Curry faces off with his archenemy John Wayne in a cinematic showdown, successfully defeating him.

== Remixes ==
An official remix of the song featuring American rapper Key Glock was released on June 1, 2022. In his verse, Glock raps about harsh realities of life and his persistence in making money in the midst of adversity, as well as applying survival tactics in the streets to surviving in the industry. In a statement, Curry said, "I reached out to Glock because I felt like he's the perfect example of 'Walkin'. Based on everything he been through and also being independent, it hasn't stopped his grind. I've always been a fan of Memphis hip hop so it just felt right." The remix serves as a lead single for the extended version of the Melt My Eyez See Your Future.

On September 30, 2022, an extended edition of the album was released, featuring new versions of the tracks that Curry recorded with the Cold Blooded Soul Band, among them "Walkin".

== Live performances ==
On July 21, 2022, Denzel Curry performed the song on The Tonight Show Starring Jimmy Fallon.

== Certifications ==
Certifications for "Walkin"
Region	Certification	Certified units/sales
Australia (ARIA)	Gold	35,000^{‡}
Canada (Music Canada)	Gold	40,000^{‡}
New Zealand (RMNZ)	Gold	15,000^{‡}
United States (RIAA)	Platinum	1,000,000^{‡}
^{‡} Sales+streaming figures based on certification alone.
