= 32 Zel/Planet Shrooms =

EP by Denzel Curry
- Released: June 9, 2015
- Recorded: 2014–2015; 2017
- Studio: House of Dreams Studios and Twelve'len Studios (Miami, Florida)
- Genre: Southern hip hop; cloud rap
- Length: 54:06
- Label: C9; PH; Loma Vista (re-release)
- Producer: Poshstronaut; Rem; Ronny J; Smoko Ono; Keenanza; Yung Icey; Lino Martinez; Nick León; Pxsh Raven

Denzel Curry chronology
Nostalgic 64 (2013)	32 Zel/Planet Shrooms (2015)	Imperial (2016)

Singles from 32 Zel/Planet Shrooms
- 1. "Ice Age" Released: June 6, 2015; 2. "Ultimate" Released: June 9, 2015

Remastered cover (32 Zel)
- Re-release cover

32 Zel/Planet Shrooms is the debut double extended play by American rapper Denzel Curry. It was released on June 9, 2015 by C9 Records. The EP features guest appearances from Mike Dece, Twelve'len, Big Rube, Nell, J.K. the Reaper, Leonardo Safari, and Fortebowie. The album was supported by the two singles, "Ice Age" featuring Mike Dece and "Ultimate". The EP also featured notable producers such as Ronny J and Nick León.

On October 14, 2016, 32 Zel/Planet Shrooms along with Curry's previous debut album Nostalgic 64 was removed from iTunes and streaming services and was later replaced by Denzel's second studio album Imperial. He stated that they would return soon and be remastered, though as of April 2024, Nostalgic 64 and Planet Shrooms are still absent from iTunes and Spotify. On September 22, 2017, a remastered version of 32 Zel with re-recorded vocals was released to iTunes and streaming services, however the original version is still available on YouTube Music, but completely missing 32 Zel while still having the name 32 Zel/Planet Shrooms. Notable differences include a remix version of "Ultimate" featuring Juicy J and "Ice Age", which now lacks a Mike Dece feature, with whom Curry had a public falling out.

== Track listing ==
Credits adapted from Apple Music and Genius.

32 Zel
No.	Title	Writer(s)	Producer(s)	Length
1.	"32 Ave Intro"	Denzel Curry; Bradley Chatman; Reginald Morin	Poshstronaut; Rem^{[a]}	2:23
2.	"Chief Forever"	Curry; Morin	Rem	3:23
3.	"Envy Me"	Curry; Ronald Spencer Jr.; L. Bernard-Adam	Ronny J	4:32
4.	"Ultimate"	Curry; Spencer	Ronny J	3:14
5.	"Lord Vader Kush II"	Curry; Darian Garcia	Smoko Ono	4:38
6.	"Ice Age" (featuring Mike Dece)	Curry; M. Decesare; Keenan Manresa; Isaiah Devoe; Lino Martinez; Nick León	Keenanza; Yung Icey^{[a]}; Martinez^{[b]}; León^{[b]}	4:25
7.	"Delusional Shone" (featuring Twelve'len)	Curry; L. Joseph; Chatman; León; Morin; Zach Fogarty	León; Poshstronaut^{[a]}; Rem^{[b]}	5:20
Total length:				27:55

Remastered Version
No.	Title	Writer(s)	Producer(s)	Length
1.	"32 Ave Intro"	Curry; Michael Mulé; Isaac de Boni	FnZ	1:54
2.	"Chief Forever"	Curry; Morin	Rem	3:18
3.	"Envy Me"	Curry; Spencer	Ronny J	4:30
4.	"Ultimate" (remix; featuring Juicy J)	Curry; Spencer; Jordan Houston	Ronny J	4:17
5.	"Lord Vader Kush II"	Curry; Garcia	Smoko Ono	4:33
6.	"Ice Age"	Curry; Manresa; Devoe; Martinez; Leone	Keenanza; Yung Icey	2:51
7.	"Delusional Shone" (featuring Twelve'len)	Curry; Joseph; Chatman; Leone; Fogarty; Houston; Paul Beauregard	León; Poshstronaut	3:35
Total length:				24:58

Planet Shrooms
No.	Title	Writer(s)	Producer(s)	Length
8.	"Past the Wudz Intro" (featuring Big Rube)	Curry; Morin; Chatman; Ruben Bailey; Brady Watt	Rem; Poshstronaut^{[a]}	3:05
9.	"Underwater"	Curry; Christopher Valencia; Martinez; Watt	Pxsh Raven; Martinez^{[b]}	3:31
10.	"Captain Sea Fonk"	Curry; Valencia; Martinez; William Stewart	Pxsh Raven; Martinez^{[b]}	3:55
11.	"Bwoii" (featuring Nell and J.K. the Reaper)	Curry; Valencia; D. Butler; J. Kenan; Martinez	Pxsh Raven; Martinez^{[b]}	3:47
12.	"Planet Shrooms II" (featuring J.K. the Reaper)	Curry; Valencia; Chatman; Kenan	Pxsh Raven; Poshstronaut^{[a]}	3:37
13.	"Smoke 2049"	Curry; Valencia; Morin	Pxsh Raven; Rem^{[b]}	3:23
14.	"Void" (featuring Leonardo Safari and ForteBowie)	Curry; Valencia; Matthew Cummings; Martinez; T. Ford; Watt; M. Ayuk-Okata	Pxsh Raven; Martinez^{[b]}	4:53
Total length:				54:06

Notes

- ^{^[a]} signifies a co-producer
- ^{^[b]} signifies an additional producer
- "Delusional Shone" features background vocals by Vares of Twelve'len.
