= Ultimate (Denzel Curry song) =

2015 single by Denzel Curry

Single by Denzel Curry

from the EP 32 Zel/Planet Shrooms
- Released: June 9, 2015
- Recorded: 2014–15
- Length: 3:14
- Label: Loma Vista Recordings
- Songwriters: Denzel Curry; Ronald Spence Jr.
- Producer: Ronny J

Denzel Curry singles chronology
"Ice Age" (2015)	"Ultimate" (2015)	"Flying Nimbus" (2016)

Music video
- "Ultimate" on YouTube

"Ultimate" is a song by American rapper Denzel Curry, released on June 9, 2015, as the lead single from his debut double EP 32 Zel/Planet Shrooms. Produced and co-written by Ronny J, it is considered Curry's breakout hit.

The song went viral in early 2016 when users of the video hosting service Vine began uploading various memes in which the song's hook would play towards the end of the video. The meme spread to other websites such as YouTube. It was also featured in the video game Counter-Strike: Global Offensive and its sequel, Counter-Strike 2.

The official remix of the song, featuring American rapper Juicy J, appears on the remastered version of 32 Zel/Planet Shrooms. A music video for the remix was released on March 20, 2019.

== Charts ==
Chart (2016)	Peak position
US R&B/Hip-Hop Digital Songs (Billboard)	38

== Certifications ==
Region	Certification	Certified units/sales
Australia (ARIA)	Gold	35,000^{‡}
New Zealand (RMNZ)	Gold	15,000^{‡}
Poland (ZPAV)	Gold	25,000^{‡}
United States (RIAA)	Platinum	1,000,000^{‡}
^{‡} Sales+streaming figures based on certification alone.
