= Clout Cobain =

2018 single by Denzel Curry

Single by Denzel Curry

from the album Ta13oo
- Released: July 12, 2018
- Genre: Conscious hip hop; emo rap
- Length: 3:51
- Label: PH; Loma Vista
- Songwriters: Denzel Curry; Julian Gramm; Mike Hector
- Producers: J Gramm; Hector

Denzel Curry singles chronology
"Percs" (2018)	"Clout Cobain" (2018)	"Vengeance" (2018)

Music video
- "Clout Cobain" on YouTube

"Clout Cobain" (stylized CLOUT COBAIN | CLOUT CO13A1N) is a song by American rapper Denzel Curry released on July 12, 2018, as the third single from his third studio album, Ta13oo. Written by Curry alongside producers J Gramm and Mike Hector, the song lyrically is about his struggles with fame. It also makes several references to Kurt Cobain, the lead singer of American rock band, Nirvana, who committed suicide at the age of 27. The Zev Deans-directed official music video was released on Curry's Vevo channel the same day as the single, and has since been viewed more than 100 million times, becoming his most watched video.

== Music video ==
The music video, released at the same time as the song, features Curry as a clown controlled by his master. The clown later commits suicide, causing the audience to boo the performance. The video received acclaim from critics. The video for Curry's follow up single, "Vengeance", can be seen as a sequel to this, while the video for Curry's other single, "Black Balloons", can be seen as a prequel to it.

== Charts ==
Chart (2018)	Peak position
US Bubbling Under R&B/Hip-Hop Singles (Billboard)	6

== Certifications ==
Region	Certification	Certified units/sales
Australia (ARIA)	Platinum	70,000^{‡}
Canada (Music Canada)	Platinum	80,000^{‡}
New Zealand (RMNZ)	Gold	15,000^{‡}
United States (RIAA)	Platinum	1,000,000^{‡}
^{‡} Sales+streaming figures based on certification alone.
