= 13 (Denzel Curry EP) =

EP by Denzel Curry
- Released: June 26, 2017
- Recorded: Various: Austin, Texas; Los Angeles, California; Baltimore, Maryland; New York City, New York
- Genre: Hardcore hip hop; trap; experimental hip hop
- Length: 13:14
- Label: PH; Loma Vista
- Producer: Eric Dingus; FNZ; Mickey de Grand IV; Ronny J; Vae Cortez

Denzel Curry chronology
Imperial (2016)	13 (2017)	Ta13oo (2018)

13 is an EP by American rapper Denzel Curry, released on June 26, 2017, by PH Recordings and Loma Vista Recordings. The EP features guest appearances by Ronny J and Lil Ugly Mane. It also features production by FNZ, Eric Dingus, Vae Cortez, and Ronny J, among others.

The EP serves as a prelude to his third studio album, Ta13oo, released in July 2018.

== Background ==
Curry explained the meaning behind the numerical title and the EP's theme by saying,

The ideology behind 13 the number is actually the representation of B and B is the letter beginning of the word Black (13LACK). 13 is seen as an unfortunate and unlucky number due to superstition that's plagued society for generations. I'm considered misfortune due to the fact that I'm not only a black person but I've always felt that my heart and soul was black due to certain circumstances in life that I have yet to get over and you don't have to be African American to feel that way. 13 is all around us, for example 13 is a difficult age for most because it's our path to adult hood. Jesus and 12 disciples make 13 according to big rube and lastly the 13th floor was always seen as something to be afraid of world wide. 13 is the part of an unfortunate distorted life.

In an interview with XXL, Curry explained the EP's sudden release, by stating,

The reason why I put out the 13 EP is because I got bored. I wanted to supply my fans with something. I knew I couldn't give them the stuff from the album. The album's not even done yet. It's almost done, but it's not done yet, and I want to make sure it's perfect to a tee before I even think about releasing anything.

== Singles ==
The EP was supported by three promotional singles: "Equalizer" featuring Ronny J, "Hate Government", and "Zeltron 6 Billion" featuring Lil Ugly Mane.

== Track listing ==
Credits adapted from album's liner notes.

No.	Title	Writer(s)	Producer(s)	Length
1.	"Bloodshed"	Denzel Curry	Eric Dingus	3:21
2.	"Hate Government"	Curry	FNZ	1:35
3.	"Equalizer" (featuring Ronny J)	Curry; Ronald Spencer, Jr.	Ronny J	2:49
4.	"Heartless"	Curry	Vae Cortez	2:20
5.	"Zeltron 6 Billion" (featuring Lil Ugly Mane)	Curry; Travis Miller	FNZ; Mickey de Grand IV	3:09

== Personnel ==
Credits adapted from album's liner notes.

Technical

- Nate Burgess - recording and mixing (all tracks)
