= Yung Simmie =

American rapper

- Also known as: Simmie; Big Smokey
- Born: Andrew Lamont Thomas; Carol City, Miami, Florida, U.S.
- Genres: Trap; cloud rap
- Occupations: Rapper; songwriter; producer
- Years active: 2011–present
- Label: 3B Music Group
- Formerly of: Raider Klan

Andrew Lamont Thomas, better known by his stage name Yung Simmie, is an American rapper from Miami, Florida. He was a member of the South Florida-based hip hop group, Raider Klan.

== Career ==
=== 2011–2014: Career beginnings, Basement Musik and Shut Up and Vibe series ===
Yung Simmie began rapping at a young age before he started recording and releasing songs through his SoundCloud profile. In December 2011, he released his first body of work as an underground rapper entitled Purple Lady Underground Tape, a mixtape he released as an independent artist. In early 2012, he was signed to Raider Klan Records. It was under the label he released his first official mixtapes titled G Funk Resurrection 1993–1995: Underground Tape and Tha Undergrxxxd Mixtape: XXL Freshman xf 1993 in February and May 2012 respectively. With production credits from Key Nyata, SpaceGhostPurrp, Lil Ugly Mane, with vocal features from some members of Raider Klan including long-time friend Denzel Curry; both mixtapes largely pay tribute to the gangsta-funk genre of hip hop he grew up listening to.

On January 7, 2013, he released the first installment of his Basement Musik series. The mixtape included singles like "No More" featuring Chris Travis, "Florida Nigga Mentality (Remix)" featuring SpaceGhostPurrp and "Basement Musik". Colin Small of Potholes in My Blog literarily compared the mixtape to When the Smoke Clears: Sixty 6, Sixty 1, the fourth studio album of Three 6 Mafia. Rating the mixtape 4 out of 5, he further went on to note that "Basement Musik is a well-crafted synthesis of the neo-Memphis sounds of 2012". On July 16, he released Shut Up and Vibe Vol. 1, the first installment of his Shut Up and Vibe series. The mixtape includes songs like "Lean With the Sprite" and "Disrespect" featuring vocals from SpaceGhostPurrp. Yung Simmie is credited to have featured vocals on Denzel Curry's Nostalgic 64 in a song titled "Threatz", which Mike Madden of Pitchfork Magazine listed as his top 10 individual tracks of 2013. December, Yung Simmie released Basement Musik 2. With no vocal features, the 16-track project enlists the production services of Trill Will, DJ Smokey, PurrpDogg and Yung Simmie.

In June 2014, Yung Simmie achieved online recognition upon the release of "Acrobat Freestyle", a song which peaked at No. 11 on Billboard Twitter Emerging Artists Chart for the week of June 7. He started working on his debut studio album Shut Up and Vibe 2 with the release of two lead singles titled "Full Metal" which peaked at No. 8 on Billboard's Twitter Emerging Artists chart for the week of June 28; and "Thankful" featuring vocals from SpaceGhostPurrp. The album was released on July 7 through Raider Klan Records and enlists the production services of Eskay, Reazy Renegade, DJ Smokey, Trill Will amongst others with vocal appearances from Robb Banks, Pouya, Cashy and Denzel Curry.

=== 2015–present: Yung Smokey and Simmie Season series ===
On January 15, 2015, Yung Simmie released Yung Smokey, a mixtape which gained him new grounds and further earned him features in XXL and Miami New Times. Preceding the release of Yung Smokey were two lead singles, "20/20" and "Spaceship". A Passion of the Weiss contributor was impressed with the overall production of the album and Yung Simmie's lyrical improvements. He further concluded that "Yung Smokey is the best realized of his (Yung Simmie) increasingly worthwhile album material". It charted on the Billboard Twitter Emerging Artists chart at No. 31 for three weeks. In May 2015, he teamed up with Raider Klan to release Raider Klan: The Mixtape 2.75, in which he released a song and featured vocals on three other songs. On December 18, he released OG Smoke, a 6-track EP which features only Denzel Curry in vocal capacity and production from captaincrunch, HighAF, Jay$plash and Yung Icey Beats.

On July 1, 2016, Yung Simmie released Simmie Season, the first volume of his Simmie Season series. With singles like "Shoot Da 3", "Bucks", "Drama Time" and "Underground King", the albums won him a spot in Vibes`s "30 Florida Rappers You Need To Hear." He later released Simmie Season 2 in October 2016. The project includes singles like "Bucks" and "Yung Bob Marley" with production handled by PurrpDogg, HighAF, Jay Splash and Yung Simmie.

Simmie announced via Twitter that he would be releasing his upcoming project Big Smokey on October 3, 2017.

== Musical style and influences ==
As per the Billboard magazine, slow trap beats, boastful lyrics, multiple references to drugs, alcohol and sex form the leitmotifs of Thomas' rap songs. As per the Vibe magazine, Thomas, currently during his career, "[...] owned the popular cloud rap style that was spawned in the South" and "has dominated the underground scene with records like Full Metal 2 and Shoot The 3..."

In an interview with XXL, Thomas stated that while Lil Wayne has been his favorite artist, he wished to emulate Bob Marley to "touch people with my music like he did."

== Discography ==
=== Mixtapes ===
- Purple Lady Underground Tape 1993–1995 (2011)
- Basement Musik (2013)
- Shut Up And Vibe (2013)
- Basement Musik 2 (2013)
- Shut Up And Vibe 2 (2014)
- Yung Smokey (2015)
- Basement Musik 3 (2015)
- Simmie Season 2 (2016)
- Big Smokey (2017)

=== EPs ===
- OG Smoke (2015)

=== Singles ===
- When Im Bored (2015)
- Dead Beat (2015)

=== Guest appearances ===
List of guest appearances, with other performing artists, showing year released and album name
Title	Year	Artist(s)	Album
"Threatz"	2013	Denzel Curry, Robb Bank$	Nostalgic 64
"Playa Pimpin"	2014	Cashy	Platinum Plus
"Pay Homage"	2015	Young Roddy, Kydnice	Non-album single
"Everywhere I Go"	2015	Dj E-Feezy, Denzel Curry	The Wolf Of South Beach
"275 Suicide"	2016	Suicideboys	Eternal Grey
"Jugg With You"	2017	Dante Swave, Reazy Renegade	Non-album single
