= Jasiah =

American rapper (born 1996)

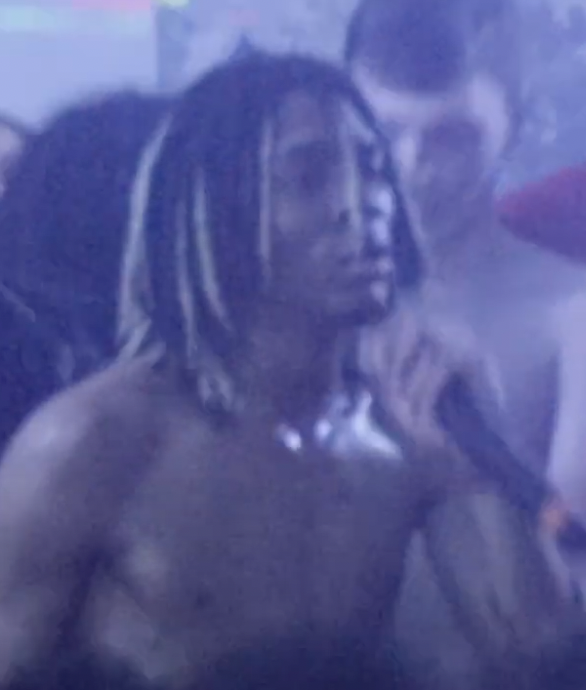
- Jasiah performing in 2020

Background information
- Also known as: Phree; PhreeTheRapper
- Born: Malachi-Phree Jasiah Pate; October 19, 1996 (age 29); Dayton, Ohio, U.S
- Genres: Hip hop; trap metal; rock; screamo; pop punk; alternative rock
- Occupations: Rapper; songwriter; record producer
- Years active: 2011–present
- Label: Atlantic

Malachi-Phree Jasiah Pate (born October 19, 1996), known professionally as Jasiah, is an American rapper, songwriter and record producer from Dayton, Ohio who is currently signed to Atlantic Records. He is known for his usage of screaming in vocals and sinister lyrics.

== Career ==
In 2011, Jasiah began making beats using software Garage Band and Ableton. In 2014, he released his first project titled #CheckOutMySoundcloud. In 2017, his song "HaHaHaHa" gained traction after his girlfriend sent the song to American rapper Ugly God who shared it on social media platform Twitter. He began gaining traction with the release of his single "Rip X" a tribute to late American rapper XXXTentacion. In July 2019, he released his debut album Jasiah I Am. In April 2019, he released his collaboration with American rapper 6ix9ine "Case 19". In September 2019, he released his single "Heartbreak" a collaboration with American drummer Travis Barker from the rock band Blink-182 alongside an accompanying music video. In April 2021, he released his EP War. In June 2021, he released his single "Art of War", a collaboration with American rappers Denzel Curry and Rico Nasty. In March 2023, he released his second album 3.

== Musical style ==
During a mixed review by Nadine Smith of Pitchfork, Jasiah's musical style on his album War is described in the following manner: "Jasiah’s music is ultimately indicative of his digital origins. Even more than hyperpop, WAR takes an accelerationist approach to rap, devouring a half-decade of online scenes and styles and spitting them out into a chewed-up psychedelic combination. He screams loud enough to make you listen, but it’s hard to tell if his shouts will sustain for longer than 15 minutes."

== Discography ==
=== Studio albums ===
List of albums, with selected details
Title	Album details
Jasiah I Am	Released: July 19, 2019; Label: Atlantic; Format: CD, digital download, streaming
3	Released: March 24, 2023; Label: Atlantic; Format: CD, digital download, streaming
No Holds Barred	Released: March 14, 2025; Label: New 11 Records; Format: Unknown

=== Mixtapes ===
List of mixtapes, with selected details
Title	Mixtape details
#CheckOutMySoundcloud	Released: 2014; Label: Independent; Format: Digital download, streaming
Rysuko	Released: October 26, 2020; Label: Independent; Format: Digital download, streaming
Lost Lands Vol. 1	Released: January 18, 2022; Label: Independent; Format: Digital download, streaming

=== Extended plays ===
List of extended plays, with selected details
Title	Extended play details
Antisocial Extrovert	Released: July 2, 2016; Label: Independent; Format: Digital download, streaming
Phree Smoke	Released: October 10, 2017; Label: Independent; Format: Digital download, streaming
iii	Released: October 31, 2017; Label: Independent; Format: Digital download, streaming
SpicyChickenSandwich	Released: April 6, 2018; Label: Independent; Format: Digital download, streaming
Phree Mind	Released: May 2, 2018; Label: Independent; Format: Digital download, streaming
War	Released: April 2, 2021; Label: Atlantic Records; Format: CD, digital download, streaming
Melancholy Money	Released: August 21, 2022; Label: Independent; Format: Digital download, streaming

=== Certified singles ===
Title	Year	Certifications	Album
"Break Shit"	2020	RIAA: Gold	War
