= Ta13oo =

- Cover for Ta13oo and Act 3: Dark

Studio album by Denzel Curry
- Released: July 27, 2018
- Recorded: 2017–2018
- Genre: Hip-hop
- Length: 43:20
- Label: PH; Loma Vista
- Producer: Charlie Heat; DJ Dahi; FnZ; Hippie Sabotage; HWLS; Illmind; J Gramm; Matt Rad; Mickey de Grand IV; Mike Hector; Ronny J; Swish

Denzel Curry chronology
13 (2017)	Ta13oo (2018)	Zuu (2019)

Alternative covers
- Act 1: Light

- Act 2: Gray

Singles from Ta13oo
- 1. "Sumo" Released: March 30, 2018; 2. "Percs" Released: May 25, 2018; 3. "Clout Cobain" Released: July 12, 2018; 4. "Vengeance" Released: September 5, 2018; 5. "Black Balloons" Released: March 27, 2019

Ta13oo (stylized in all caps and pronounced Taboo) is the third studio album by American rapper Denzel Curry. It was released on July 27, 2018, through PH Recordings and distributed by Loma Vista Recordings. The album serves as the follow-up to Curry's second studio album, Imperial, released in 2016, and the 13 EP, released in 2017. Ta13oo features guest appearances from Twelve'len, GoldLink, Nyyjerya, JID, JPEGMafia, ZillaKami, and additional vocals by Billie Eilish. Production was handled by FnZ, DJ Dahi, Ronny J, Illmind, Charlie Heat, and Mickey de Grand IV, among others.

Ta13oo was supported by five singles: "Sumo", "Percs", "Clout Cobain", "Vengeance", and "Black Balloons". The album received widespread acclaim from critics.

== Background ==
In an interview with Zane Lowe, Denzel Curry described the structure of the album: "I was in a dark space when I was working on the dark part. I was tryna work on the light part when I was working toward my happiness."

A statement accompanying the music video to "Clout Cobain" stated: "Across the three sections of Ta13oo, Denzel explores topics including molestation, the presidential election, fame, hatred, paranoia, revenge, love, the current state of music and personal tales of his own near-death experiences. Sonically, the album ranges just as widely as its subject matter, sounds of paranoia, fear of loss, brooding melancholy and mood swings straight from hell all find their way onto Ta13oo."

== Release and promotion ==
The first single, "Sumo", was released on March 30, 2018, for streaming and digital download. The second single, "Percs", was released on May 25, 2018. The third single, "Clout Cobain", was released on July 12, 2018, alongside a music video. "Black Balloons" and "Cash Maniac" were made available for digital download as promotional singles on July 23 and 24, 2018.

The album was released as three acts consecutively between July 25 and 27, 2018, with the album released in its totality on July 27, 2018. Subsequently, "Vengeance" was released as a single on September 5, 2018, while "Black Balloons" was promoted on March 27, 2019.

== Critical reception ==
Professional ratings
Aggregate scores
Source	Rating
Metacritic	86/100
Review scores
Source	Rating
AllMusic	4/5 stars
Highsnobiety	3.5/5
HipHopDX	4.5/5
HotNewHipHop	91%
The Music	4.5/5 stars
Pitchfork	7.7/10
Pretty Much Amazing	A−
Sputnikmusic	4.2/5

Ta13oo was met with widespread critical acclaim. At Metacritic, which assigns a normalized rating out of 100 to reviews from professional publications, the album received an average score of 86, based on six reviews.

Marshall Gu of Pretty Much Amazing wrote, "Ultimately, easily one of the most simultaneously hardest and atmospheric hip-hop albums of the year". In his review for HipHopDX, Justin Ivey praised the album, writing, "Curry has constructed a project that plays to the sonic structures of the era without sacrificing meaningful content in doing so. TA13OO is the culmination of his promise and talent, resulting in Curry's magnum opus". Sputnikmusic's critic Jordan M. said, "Realistically, Ta13oo is extremely satisfying from a consumption standpoint. It's everything I'd want from a rap album this year". Concluding his review for AllMusic, Neil Z. Yeung stated that "With this additional substance and strategic guest contributions, Curry is elevated on TA13OO -- despite this deep dive into despair and darkness -- hinting at more insight on future efforts".

In a positive review, Dean Van Nguyen of Pitchfork wrote that "It's when he sticks to the highly personal that Curry's music is devoid of all cliché—the power of his performance, the veracity of his pen, and the color of his wordplay make him an expert at voicing the tribulations of this doomed condition we call being young. All of this makes him impossible to place in the broader SoundCloud rap domain. Signs point to an artist who will outlast any single distribution platform—or any of the genres named for them". Trey Alston of Highsnobiety gave the album a favorable review, writing, "To call it psychedelic is a cliché, but the album is a multi-part, constantly-moving, collection of harsh emotions with a funky twist that works, even if the final leg slows down the momentum a tad".

=== Year-end lists ===
Select year-end rankings of Ta13oo
Publication	List	Rank	Ref.
Complex	50 Best Albums of 2018	29	
Consequence	The Top 50 Albums of 2018	45	
Stereogum	The Best Albums of 2018	44	
Vinyl Me, Please	The Best Albums of 2018	31	

== Track listing ==
Credits were adapted from the album's liner notes.

Act 1: Light
No.	Title	Writer(s)	Producer(s)	Length
1.	"Taboo"	Denzel Curry; Isaac DeBoni; Michael Hirschenberg; Michael Mule; Latisha Hyman	FnZ; M-Sol	3:17
2.	"Black Balloons" (featuring Twelve'len and GoldLink)	Curry; DeBoni; Mule; Ryan DeGrandy; Matthew Radosevich; D'Anthony Carlos; LaVares Joseph	FnZ; Matt Rad; Mickey de Grand IV	3:30
3.	"Cash Maniac" (featuring Nyyjerya)	Curry; DeBoni; DeGrandy; Mule; Samuel Ahana; Imani Taylor	FnZ; Mickey de Grand IV; Swish	3:18
4.	"Sumo"	Curry; Ernest Brown	Charlie Heat	3:47

Act 2: Gray
No.	Title	Writer(s)	Producer(s)	Length
5.	"Super Saiyan Superman"	Curry; DeBoni; Mule; Justin Elwin	FnZ; HWLS	2:12
6.	"Switch It Up"	Curry; Ramon Ibanga Jr.; Ronald Spence Jr.	Illmind; Ronny J	2:55
7.	"Mad I Got It"	Curry; DeBoni; Mule; Jeff Saurer; Kevin Saurer; Khalil Abdul-Rahman; Javohn Griffin	FnZ; Hippie Sabotage	3:52
8.	"Sirens" (featuring JID)	Curry; Dacoury Natche; Destin Route; Billie Eilish O'Connell; Brent Reynolds	DJ Dahi	3:56
9.	"Clout Cobain"	Curry; Julian Gramma; Mike Hector	J Gramm; Hector	3:51

Act 3: Dark
No.	Title	Writer(s)	Producer(s)	Length
10.	"The Blackest Balloon"	Curry; DeBoni; DeGrandy; Mule; Soulja Mook	FnZ; Mickey de Grand IV	2:55
11.	"Percs"	Curry; DeBoni; Mule	FnZ; Curry^{[a]}	3:06
12.	"Vengeance" (featuring JPEGMafia and ZillaKami)	Curry; DeBoni; DeGrandy; Mule; Barrington Hendricks; Junius Rogers	FnZ; Mickey de Grand IV	4:00
13.	"Black Metal Terrorist"	Curry; DeBoni; Hirschenberg; Mule; Spence; Mickey Degrand	FnZ; Ronny J; M-Sol^{[a]}	2:41
Total length:				43:20

Notes

- ^{^[a]} signifies an additional producer
- All tracks stylized in all caps. Letters "I", "B" and "S" are stylized as "1", "13" and "Z" respectively; the altered track names are listed alongside their normal all caps counterparts. "Black Metal Terrorist" is also shortened to "13 M T".
- "Taboo" features background vocals by Tish Hyman and VSC
- "Black Balloons" features background vocals by Savannah Cristina and Mickey de Grand IV, and additional vocals by Nathan Burgess and Illeana Cardenas
- "Cash Maniac" and "Vengeance" feature additional vocals by Mickey de Grand IV
- "Sirens" features additional vocals by Billie Eilish
- "The Blackest Balloon" features additional vocals by Soulja Mook
- "Black Metal Terrorist" features additional vocals by Gino Vento

== Charts ==
2018 chart performance for Ta13oo
Chart (2018)	Peak position
Australian Albums (ARIA)	27
Belgian Albums (Ultratop Flanders)	40
Belgian Albums (Ultratop Wallonia)	173
Canadian Albums (Billboard)	84
Dutch Albums (Album Top 100)	30
Finnish Albums (Suomen virallinen lista)	36
Irish Albums (IRMA)	37
New Zealand Albums (RMNZ)	16
UK Albums (OCC)	62
US Billboard 200	28
US Top R&B/Hip-Hop Albums (Billboard)	15

2026 chart performance for Ta13oo
Chart (2026)	Peak position
Greek Albums (IFPI)	78
