= Imperial (Denzel Curry album) =

Studio album by Denzel Curry
- Released: March 9, 2016
- Recorded: 2015–16
- Studio: Various
- Genres: Southern hip-hop; cloud rap; conscious hip-hop
- Length: 38:42
- Labels: C9; Loma Vista (re-release)
- Producers: Ronny J; BloodPop; DJ Dahi; FNZ; Freebase; Lino Martinez; Nick Leon; Promnite; Steve Lacy; Budd Dwyer

Denzel Curry chronology
32 Zel/Planet Shrooms (2015)	Imperial (2016)	13 (2017)

Singles from Imperial
- 1. "Knotty Head" Released: February 17, 2016; 2. "ULT" Released: February 21, 2016; 3. "Gook" Released: September 8, 2016; 4. "Zenith" Released: November 15, 2016

Imperial is the second studio album by American rapper Denzel Curry. It was released and made available for free download and streaming on SoundCloud on March 9, 2016, then re-released later on Spotify as the deluxe version on October 14, 2016. The album features guest appearances from Rick Ross, Joey Bada$$, Twelve'len and Nell. The album was supported by the single "Knotty Head" featuring Rick Ross.

The re-released version of the album removes the tracks "Narcotics" and "Pure Enough" and replaces them with "Me Now" and "Good Night". The placement of "This Life" was also changed, with it being moved from track #9 to track #7.

== Singles ==
"Knotty Head" was released as the album's lead single on February 17, 2016, on Curry's SoundCloud. The album version features a guest appearance from rapper Rick Ross, while the single release only featured Curry. The production was provided by FNZ and Ronny J.

== Critical reception ==
Professional ratings
Review scores
Source	Rating
AllMusic	4/5 stars
HipHopDX	3.7/5
Pretty Much Amazing	B+

Imperial received critical acclaim. Stereogum described the album as "a hazy, gurgling rap record that's clearly the work of an active mind".

== Track listing ==
Credits adapted from Denzel Curry's official SoundCloud account and digital booklet.

Imperial – Standard edition
No.	Title	Writer(s)	Producer(s)	Length
1.	"ULT"	Denzel Curry; Ronald Spencer, Jr.; Nick Leon; Michael Mule; Isaac Deboni	Ronny J; Leon; FNZ	4:07
2.	"Gook"	Curry; Spencer, Jr.; Mule; Deboni; Lino Martinez	Ronny J; FNZ; Martinez^{[a]}	2:46
3.	"Sick & Tired"	Curry; Spencer, Jr.; Mule; Deboni	Ronny J; FNZ	4:02
4.	"Knotty Head" (featuring Rick Ross)	Curry; William Roberts II; Mule; Deboni; Spencer, Jr.	FNZ; Ronny J	4:34
5.	"Narcotics"	Curry; Aristos Petrou; Scott Arceneaux; Martinez	Budd Dwyer; Martinez^{[a]}	3:31
6.	"Story: No Title"	Curry; Martinez	Promnite; Martinez^{[a]}	2:49
7.	"Pure Enough"	Curry; Spencer, Jr.; Mule; Deboni	Ronny J; FNZ	3:48
8.	"Zenith" (featuring Joey Bada$$)	Curry; Jo-Vaughn Scott; Spencer, Jr.; Mule; Deboni	Freebase; Ronny J; FNZ	4:03
9.	"This Life"	Curry; Spencer, Jr.; Mule; Deboni	Ronny J; FNZ	3:27
10.	"If Tomorrow's Not Here" (featuring Twelve'Len)	Curry; LaVares Joseph; Steve Lacy	Lacy	5:35
Total length:				38:42

Imperial – Re-released edition
No.	Title	Writer(s)	Producer(s)	Length
1.	"ULT"	Curry; Spencer, Jr.; Mule; Deboni	Ronny J; Nick Leon; FNZ	4:07
2.	"Gook"	Curry; Spencer, Jr.; Mule; Deboni	Ronny J; FNZ; Lino Martinez^{[a]}	2:46
3.	"Sick & Tired"	Curry; Spencer, Jr.; Mule; Deboni	Ronny J; FNZ	4:02
4.	"Knotty Head" (featuring Rick Ross)	Curry; Roberts II; Spencer, Jr.; Mule; Deboni	FNZ; Ronny J	4:28
5.	"Me Now"	Curry	DJ Dahi; BloodPop	4:39
6.	"Story: No Title"	Curry	Promnite; Lino Martinez^{[a]}	2:49
7.	"This Life"	Curry; Spencer, Jr.; Mule; Deboni	Ronny J; FNZ	3:27
8.	"Zenith" (featuring Joey Bada$$)	Curry; Scott; Spencer, Jr.; Mule; Deboni	Freebase; Ronny J; FNZ	4:03
9.	"Good Night" (featuring Nell and Twelve'Len)	Curry; Joseph	FNZ	3:56
10.	"If Tomorrow's Not Here" (featuring Twelve'Len)	Curry; Joseph; Lacy	Lacy	5:35
Total length:				39:58

Notes

- ^{^[a]} signifies an additional producer.
- "Sick & Tired" contains two parts, "Green Store Skit" features vocals by Vares of Twelve'Len and DJ Chief Pound
- "Pure Enough" features additional vocals by Vares of Twelve'Len
- "If Tomorrow's Not Here" features additional vocals by Steve Lacy

=== Sample credits ===
- "ULT" contains a sample of "Sweet Nothin's", as performed by Brenda Lee and samples of "What You Will See (Heavenly Garden)" from Tekken Tag Tournament 2 soundtrack.
- "Narcotics" contains a sample of "Fuck tha Police", as performed by N.W.A, excerpts of a documentary film "The Murder of Fred Hampton", excerpts of a 1964 Malcolm X interview and excerpts of 1994 Tupac Shakur interview.
- "Story: No Title" contains a sample of "Crash Goes Love (Yell Apella) by Loleatta Holloway.
