= Hive Mind (Knocked Loose song) =

2026 song by Knocked Loose

Single by Knocked Loose featuring Denzel Curry
- Released: 10 February 2026
- Genre: Metalcore; rap metal; beatdown hardcore
- Length: 3:26
- Label: Pure Noise
- Songwriters: Bryan Garris; Kevin Kaine; Kevin Otten; Isaac Hale; Nicko Calderon; Denzel Curry
- Producer: Drew Fulk

Knocked Loose singles chronology
"Suffocate" (2024)	"Hive Mind" (2026)

Denzel Curry singles chronology
"Lit Effect" (2026)	"Hive Mind" (2026)	"The Scythe" (2026)

Music video
- "Hive Mind" on YouTube

"Hive Mind" is a song recorded by American hardcore punk band Knocked Loose, featuring guest vocals from American rapper Denzel Curry. It was released on February 10, 2026, through Pure Noise Records. It is a standalone single and the band's first new music since their 2024 album You Won't Go Before You're Supposed To. It received a nomination for Best Metal Performance at the 69th Annual Grammy Awards.

== Background and release ==
The idea for the collaboration developed after Knocked Loose toured with $uicideboy$, which prompted discussion about whether they could collaborate with a rapper. Vocalist Bryan Garris said that if they were to collaborate with a rapper, Denzel Curry was the only person he felt would make sense for the collaboration. The band recorded a rough demo and sent it to producer Kenny Beats, who then passed it on to Curry. Curry responded within an hour, after which the project moved forward. The band first met Curry in person at Outbreak Festival, and the music video was filmed shortly after the Louder Than Life festival in Louisville.

The collaboration had been discussed by the band for some time, as they considered whether such a collaboration would be feasible and who might be involved. Garris stated that the collaboration would only work with Curry, "because he gets it".

The band first teased the collaboration on Instagram with a video showing a DJ setting up at a skatepark and taking out a record listing both artists and the track name. The song was released with a music video on February 10, 2026.

== Composition and style ==
Garris said the song "might be one of the heaviest" the band had written.

The song has been described as a "fast-paced rager" that resembles classic Knocked Loose until Curry's vocals enter. It has also been described as not being a typical rap rock song. The Guardian noted that it has Curry delivering rapid lyrics over Knocked Loose's explosive groove-metal rhythms. The track combines metalcore instrumentation with rap-influenced production elements, including scratches and 808s. It opens with a fast hardcore section before transitioning to a breakdown, and the final 30 seconds include a trap beat leading into a heavy breakdown. Isaac Hale also performs a guitar solo on the track.

Vocally, Garris delivers intense hardcore-style screams, while Curry contributes a rapid-fire rap verse on the second verse. After a breakdown, Curry's section has been described as "straight Anthrax/Public Enemy-style rap metal".

The lyrics address themes of groupthink and criticize people who "can't think for themselves", with both artists criticizing conformity and trend-following.

== Music video ==
The official music video was directed by Eric Richter and Bryan Garris, and filmed at the David Armstrong Extreme Park in Louisville, Kentucky, on October 15, 2025. It features skate culture in Louisville where approximately 700 people attended the filming. Additional performance footage was shot inside a historic building in downtown Louisville. The video includes scenes of moshing, skateboarding, and home tattoos, and pays homage to punk and skateboarding subcultures.

== Accolades ==
Awards and nominations for "Hive Mind"
Year	Award ceremony	Category	Result	Ref.
2027	69th Annual Grammy Awards	Best Metal Performance	Pending	

== Personnel ==
Credits adapted from Apple Music.

Knocked Loose

- Bryan Garris - lead vocals
- Isaac Hale - lead guitar, backing vocals
- Nicko Calderon - rhythm guitar
- Kevin Otten - bass
- Kevin Kaine - drums

Additional musician

- Denzel Curry - rap vocals

Additional credit

- Drew Fulk - production

== Charts ==
Chart performance for "Hive Mind"
Chart (2026)	Peak position
US Hot Hard Rock Songs (Billboard)	14
