= Zuu =

2019 studio album by Denzel Curry

Studio album by Denzel Curry
- Released: May 31, 2019
- Genre: Hip-hop
- Length: 29:02
- Labels: PH; Loma Vista
- Producers: Charlie Heat; Fabio Aguilar; FnZ; Keanu Beats; Mickey de Grand IV; Ronny J; Rugah Rahj; Tay Keith

Denzel Curry chronology
| Ta13oo (2018) | Zuu (2019) | 13lood 1n + 13lood Out Mixx (2020) |

Singles from Zuu
- 1. "Ricky" Released: May 8, 2019; 2. "Speedboat" Released: May 21, 2019

Zuu (stylized in all caps) is the fourth studio album by American rapper Denzel Curry, released through PH Recordings and Loma Vista on May 31, 2019. The title is a nickname for his home city, Carol City, Florida. It features guest appearances by Kiddo Marv, Rick Ross, Tay Keith, Ice Billion Berg, Sam Sneak, and PlayThatBoiZay. Production was primarily handled by FnZ, alongside Tay Keith himself, Charlie Heat, Ronny J, and others.

Zuu is the follow-up to Curry's 2018 studio album Ta13oo. It was supported by two singles: "Ricky" and "Speedboat". The album received widespread acclaim from critics, with many praising Curry's tributes to other artists from Carol City.

== Themes ==
Denzel Curry said that while his previous album Ta13oo (2018) was rooted in darker themes, Zuu came from homesickness for Miami. He explained: "it goes from the sounds of where I grew up, to what I was raised around, to the people I was raised around, to the sounds that pretty much shaped the person I am."

== Promotion ==
The first single, "Ricky", was released on May 8, 2019, for streaming and digital download, along with an accompanying music video. The second single, "Speedboat", was released on May 21, for streaming and digital download after Curry teased it on social media. Curry's television debut on The Tonight Show Starring Jimmy Fallon, included a medley of "Ricky" and "Wish".

== Critical reception ==
Professional ratings
Aggregate scores
| Source | Rating |
|---|---|
| AnyDecentMusic? | 7.6/10 |
| Metacritic | 85/100 |
Review scores
| Source | Rating |
| AllMusic | 4.5/5 stars |
| Clash | 8/10 |
| Consequence | B |
| Exclaim! | 8/10 |
| Highsnobiety | 4.5/5 |
| HipHopDX | 4.1/5 |
| NME | 4/5 stars |
| Pitchfork | 8.3/10 |
| RapReviews | 7/10 |
| Spectrum Culture | 3.75/5 stars |

Zuu was met with widespread critical acclaim. At Metacritic, which assigns a normalized rating out of 100 to reviews from mainstream publications, the album received an average score of 85, based on eight reviews. Aggregator AnyDecentMusic? gave it 7.6 out of 10, based on their assessment of the critical consensus.

Neil Z. Yeung of AllMusic saying "In less than a half hour, Curry establishes himself not only as one of the most capable and exciting artists of his generation, but also worthy of a place in Miami's rap pedigree, right alongside the local icons who inspired this gem". Danny Schwartz of Highsnobiety said, "If TA1300 was a deep inward dive, ZUU is a mighty outward gesture, a salute to the masses". In a positive review, Joey Chini of Exclaim! said of the album that, "Lyrically – despite sometimes perpetuating hip-hop clichés – Curry maintains his truthfulness and willingness to address the problems of the culture, all while playing with clever bars and meaningful sentiments". Writing for Pitchfork, Sheldon Pearce ranked the album as "Best New Music" and praised the album as a tribute to Curry's hometown Carol City, calling it a "stunning Miami rap opus". Christopher Theissen of Consequence praised the album's energy in a positive review, calling it a "well-crafted action film", but criticized the short track list, saying, "But in the context of a half-hour record, every lackluster step is amplified". HipHopDX's critic Justin Ivey said, "ZUU is filled with entertaining records, but their relatively short runtimes often leave one yearning for more. This brevity is just minor quibble though when presented with rewind-worthy efforts such as "Ricky", a creation named after Curry's father".

Kyann-Sian Williams of NME wrote, "The 24-year-old Floridian rapper combines dreamy, ethereal beats with hard-hitting sounds and rhymes to relay his unique – and compelling – life story". Will Rosebury of Clash gave a positive review, stating "ZUU is an experience that transports the listener to a specific time and place. ZUU is further proof that Denzel Curry is one of hip-hop's most interesting and progressive MCs". Steve "Flash" Juon from RapReviews stated, "Even though I said Curry raps more than his peers, I didn't say he NEVER sings. He flips back and forth between both on tracks like the Rugah Rajh produced "Speedboat", but the nice thing is that he's not so heavily medicated and AutoTuned that you can't follow along with his delivery".

=== Year-end lists ===
Select year-end rankings of Zuu
| Publication | List | Rank | Ref. |
|---|---|---|---|
| Clash | Clash Albums of the Year 2019 | 27 | |
| Complex | Best Albums of 2019 | 19 | |
| Consequence | Top 50 Albums of 2019 | 34 | |
| Flood Magazine | The Best Albums of 2019 | 8 | |
| NME | The 50 Best Albums of 2019 | 35 | |
| Noisey | The 100 Best Albums of 2019 | 4 | |
| Paste | The 50 Best Albums of 2019 | 49 | |
| Pitchfork | The 50 Best Albums of 2019 | 36 | |
| Stereogum | Best Albums of 2019 | 18 | |
| Uproxx | The Best Albums of 2019 | 14 | |

== Track listing ==
Credits were adapted from the album's liner notes.

Zuu track listing
| No. | Title | Writer(s) | Producer(s) | Length |
|---|---|---|---|---|
| 1. | "Zuu" | Denzel Curry; Fabio Aguilar; Isaac DeBoni; Michael Mulé; Keanu Torres | FnZ; Aguilar; Keanu Beats | 2:06 |
| 2. | "Ricky" | D. Curry; DeBoni; Mulé; Gerard Powell II; Luke Blair | FnZ | 2:27 |
| 3. | "Wish" (featuring Kiddo Marv) | D. Curry; DeBoni; Mulé; Ernest Brown; Ryan DeGrandy; Marvin Beauville; Ulysses Kae Williams | Charlie Heat; FnZ; Mickey de Grand IV | 3:12 |
| 4. | "Birdz" (featuring Rick Ross) | D. Curry; DeBoni; Mulé; William Roberts II | FnZ | 3:24 |
| 5. | "Automatic" (with Tay Keith) | D. Curry; Brytavious Chambers; Mark Maturah | Tay Keith | 3:02 |
| 6. | "Speedboat" | D. Curry; Rugah Rahj; Michel Magne | Rahj | 3:42 |
| 7. | "Bushy B Interlude" | D. Curry; DeBoni; Mulé; Lavares Joseph; Darnell Matthew; Montrell Sneal | FnZ | 1:05 |
| 8. | "Yoo" | Plus Pierre | | 1:04 |
| 9. | "Carolmart" (featuring Ice Billion Berg) | D. Curry; DeBoni; Mulé; Jasper Harris; Joseph; Derrick Baker; Richard Jones; James Scheffer; Mark Seymour; Katrina Taylor; Algernod Washington | FnZ; Harris^{[c]} | 2:44 |
| 10. | "Shake 88" (featuring Sam Sneak) | D. Curry; DeBoni; Mulé; Sam Sneak; Joseph; Joshua Goods; Samuel Saint-Jean; Clay Dixon; Bobby Ford; Cedric Woodside | FnZ | 2:27 |
| 11. | "Blackland 66.6" | Sneak; Reyshod Curry; Shane Starks | | 0:49 |
| 12. | "P.A.T." (featuring PlayThatBoiZay) | D. Curry; DeBoni; Mulé; Ronald Spence, Jr.; Isaiah Loubeau; Markese Rolle | FnZ; Ronny J | 3:00 |
| Total length: | | | | 29:02 |

Notes

- ^{^[c]} signifies a co-producer
- "Speedboat" features additional vocals by J. Nics
- "P.A.T." is an acronym for "Project and Turmoil"

Sample credits

- "Ricky" contains a sample of "Twisted Blood" as performed by Lukid, written by Luke Blair.
- "Wish" contains an interpolation of "Genie", written by Ulysses Kae Williams.
- "Speedboat" contains a sample of "Don Juan", written and performed by Michel Magne.
- "Carolmart" contains an interpolation of "So Fresh" performed by Trina featuring Plies, written by Derrick Baker, Richard Jones, James Scheffer, Mark Seymour, Katrina Taylor, and Algernod Washington.
- "Shake 88" contains a sample of "Boot the Booty" as performed by MC Cool Rock & MC Chaszy Chess, written by Clay Dixon, Bobby Ford, and Cedric Woodside.
- "P.A.T." contains a sample of "Possessed" as performed by SpaceGhostPurrp, written by Markese Rolle.

== Charts ==
Chart performance for Zuu
| Chart (2019) | Peak position |
|---|---|
| Australian Albums (ARIA) | 18 |
| Belgian Albums (Ultratop Flanders) | 38 |
| Canadian Albums (Billboard) | 36 |
| Dutch Albums (Album Top 100) | 29 |
| Finnish Albums (Suomen virallinen lista) | 33 |
| French Albums (SNEP) | 184 |
| Irish Albums (IRMA) | 36 |
| Lithuanian Albums (AGATA) | 9 |
| New Zealand Albums (RMNZ) | 21 |
| Norwegian Albums (VG-lista) | 27 |
| Swiss Albums (Schweizer Hitparade) | 99 |
| UK Albums (Official Charts) | 61 |
| US Billboard 200 | 32 |
| US Top R&B/Hip-Hop Albums (Billboard) | 19 |
