= Denzel Curry =

American rapper (born 1995)

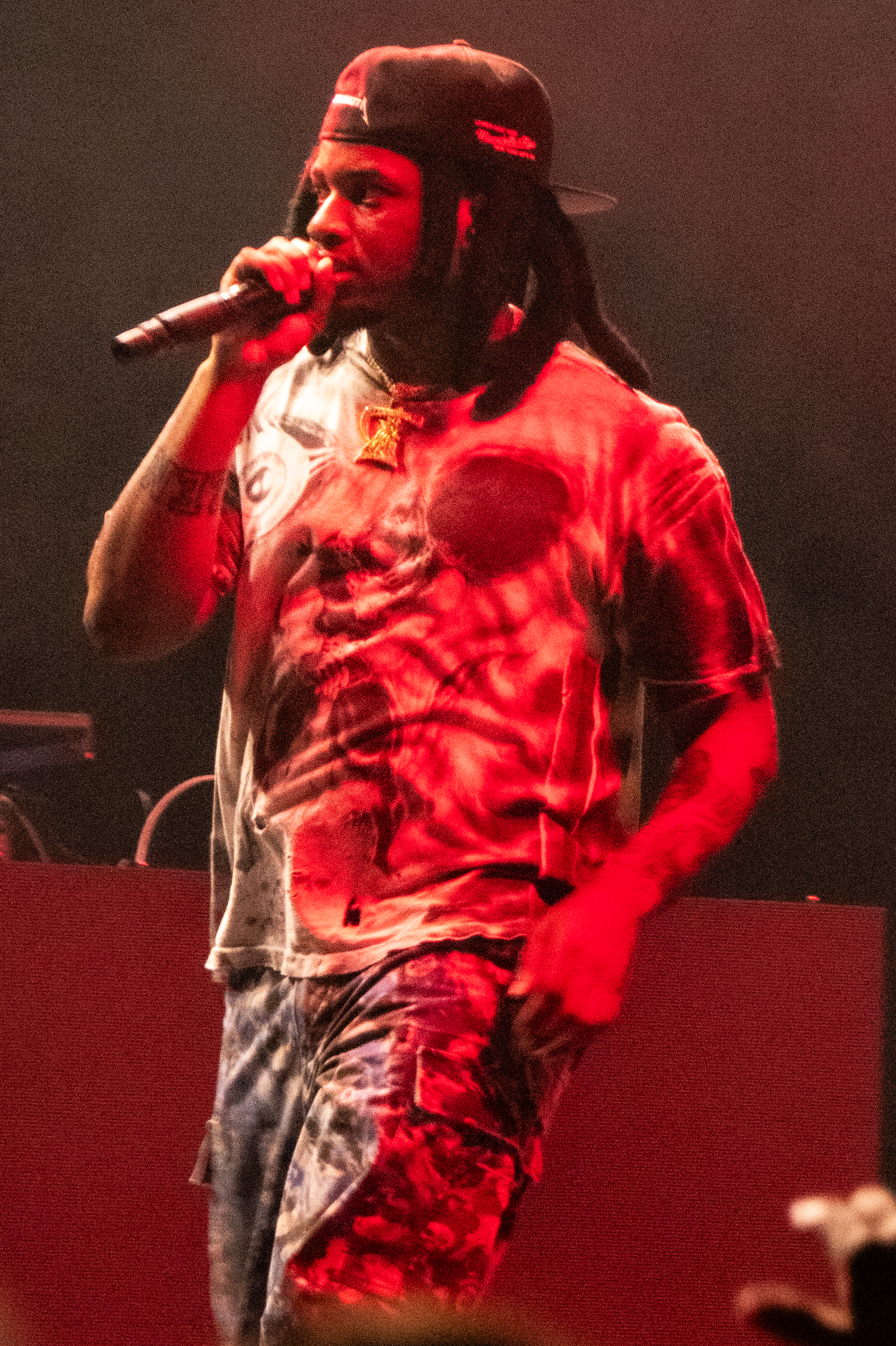
- Denzel Curry performing in 2025

Background information
- Also known as: Zeltron 6 Billion; Black Metal Terrorist; Raven Miyagi; Aquarius Killa; Big Ultra; Denny Cascade
- Born: Denzel Rae Don Curry; February 16, 1995 (age 31); Miami Gardens, Florida, U.S.
- Genres: Hip-hop; SoundCloud rap; trap; trap metal; punk rap; conscious hip-hop
- Occupations: Rapper; songwriter
- Years active: 2011–present
- Labels: Loma Vista; C9; L&E
- Member of: The Scythe
- Formerly of: Raider Klan
- Website: denzelcurry.com

Denzel Rae Don Curry (born February 16, 1995) is an American rapper. Born and raised in the Carol City neighborhood of Miami Gardens, Florida, Curry started rapping while in the sixth grade and began working on his first mixtape, King Remembered Underground Tape 1991–1995, in 2011, which was influenced by underground Florida rapper SpaceGhostPurrp. The mixtape was later featured on SpaceGhostPurrp's social media, giving Curry attention in the local music scene and resulting in him joining the former's hip-hop collective Raider Klan (stylized as RVIDXR KLVN).

Curry left Raider Klan in 2013, releasing his debut studio album, Nostalgic 64, in September of that year, while still in high school. He has since released three extended plays: 32 Zel/Planet Shrooms in 2015, 13 in 2017, and Unlocked (a collaboration with Kenny Beats) in 2020, and four studio albums: Imperial in 2016, Ta13oo in 2018, Zuu in 2019, and Melt My Eyez See Your Future in 2022. Ta13oo, Zuu, and Melt My Eyez See Your Future debuted at numbers 28, 32, and 51 on the Billboard 200 chart, respectively, with Melt My Eyez returning at number 17 after the release of an extended edition. Two years later, Curry announced King of the Mischievous South, Vol. 2 which released on July 19, 2024.

Reviewers most often praise Curry's aggressive rapping style, energetic performance, lyrical abilities, and artistic versatility. He has been credited as one of the pioneers of the SoundCloud rap genre.

== Early life ==
Denzel Rae Don Curry was born on February 16, 1995, in the Carol City neighborhood of Miami Gardens, Florida. He is of Bahamian descent. Curry started down an artist's path with early poetic ambitions in elementary school before he began rapping in the sixth grade. His time was spent at a local Boys & Girls Clubs of America chapter where he challenged others to rap battles. He attended Miami's Design and Architecture High School for two years before being expelled. Curry then attended Miami Carol City Senior High School, where he started working on Nostalgic 64 while still attending class.

== Career ==
=== 2011–2012: Early career and career beginnings ===
In early 2011, Curry's debut mixtape, titled Curry Wuz Here, surfaced on YouTube and the release date was claimed to be January 16, 2011. On September 24, Curry released his second and breakout mixtape, titled King Remembered Underground Tape 1991–1995. The mixtape being posted by Curry, was later included on SpaceGhostPurrp's page, which prompted the birth of Denzel's music career. Following the release, Curry became a member of SpaceGhostPurrp's hip-hop group, Raider Klan.

In early 2012, he released his third mixtape, titled King of the Mischievous South Vol. 1 Underground Tape 1996, a mixtape of which caught the attention of fellow American rapper Earl Sweatshirt and other members of Odd Future.

Also in 2012, Curry's fourth mixtape, titled Strictly for My R.V.I.D.X.R.Z., was released after the death of Trayvon Martin, who also lived in Carol City and went to the same high school as Curry. His style of rap and the name of the record were heavily inspired by Tupac Shakur.

Towards the end of 2012, Curry met his manager Mark Maturah, and under his guidance, released his first studio single, "Dark & Violent", featuring J. K. The Reaper and Nell, to SoundCloud.

=== 2013–2014: Nostalgic 64 ===
After the disbandment of Raider Klan, Curry deciding to embark further on his solo rap career, with the release of his debut full-length album, titled Nostalgic 64, on September 3, 2013. The album features guest appearances from JK the Reaper, Lil Ugly Mane, Mike G, Nell, Robb Bank$, Stephen A. Clark, and Yung Simmie, among others. In 2014, Curry appeared as a featured artist on Deniro Farrar's "Bow Down" (a song of which was included from Farrar's Rebirth EP) and appeared as a featured artist on Dillon Cooper's "Eyes of the World" (a song of which was included from Cooper's X:XX mixtape). Curry himself has stated that he was heavily inspired by Outkast's record, Aquemini, saying he drew the cover for Nostalgic 64 while listening to the record. He also was inspired by Goodie Mob, CeeLo Green, and amongst other southern music.

=== 2015–2016: 32 Zel/Planet Shrooms and Imperial ===
On June 9, 2015, Curry released his first extended play (EP), titled 32 Zel/Planet Shrooms. His first extended play is the double extended play, in which contains his breakout single, "Ultimate", a song that went viral and was played over Bottle Flip videos, and among others. It has amassed over 200 million streams on Spotify and earned 65 million views on YouTube. His first release was the single, called "Flying Nimbus", that was released in early 2016.

On March 9, Curry released his second full-length album, titled Imperial. In June 2016, Curry appeared in XXL magazine as part of their 2016 Freshmen Class. As part of this appearance, Curry performed a 'freshman cypher', alongside Lil Uzi Vert, Lil Yachty, 21 Savage, and Kodak Black. As of December 2024, this cypher has received over 221 million YouTube views, by far the most for the XXL channel.

The deluxe version for his second full-length album—Imperial—was re-released on Spotify on October 14.

=== 2017–2018: 13 and Ta13oo ===
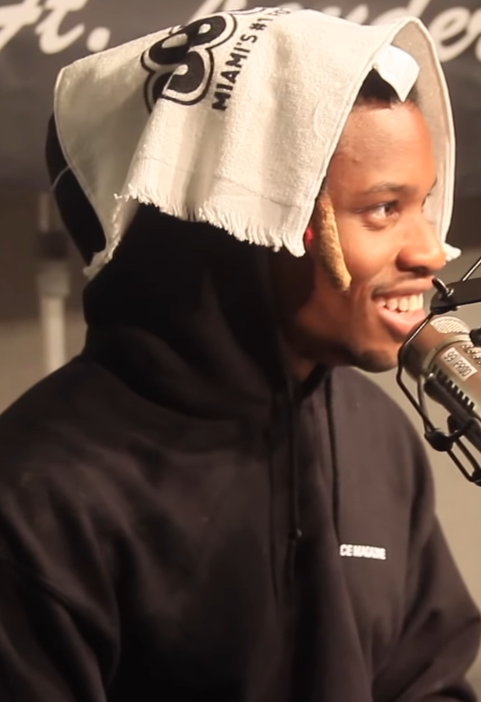
Curry in 2018

On May 13, 2017, Curry uploaded a track, titled "Hate Government [demo]", to his account on SoundCloud. In the weeks that followed, he released two more songs, titled "Equalizer [demo]" and "Zeltron 6 Billion" (featuring Lil Ugly Mane). After the releases and a series of cryptic posts on social media (seemingly portraying another alter ego called Zeltron), he released an extended play, titled 13, on June 25. Following each demo tracks being included on the extended play and two other new songs, Curry released another song, called "Skywalker", on August 18. On September 22, a remastered version of 32 Zel was released, including a remix of "Ultimate" (featuring Juicy J).

Since started releasing songs for 13, Curry made several mentions about his third studio album, titled Ta13oo, but since there was no release date for the album being announced, 13 would be serving as a sampler to Ta13oo. On February 28, 2018, he appeared as a featured artist on ASAP Ferg's "Kristi", a song of which also features other artist IDK. It was first performed live in Austin, TX, on March 10, during their collaborative tour. On March 16, he uploaded a song, titled "Uh Huh" (featuring IDK), onto his official YouTube channel.

On April 2, Curry released the lead single off of Ta13oo, titled "Sumo", on Zane Lowe's Beats 1 radio show. On May 24, Curry released the second single off the album, titled "Percs". Curry then released the third single, titled "Clout Cobain", on July 13, and announced that his album—Ta13oo—would be released in three acts: The first act, Light, was released on July 25, followed by Gray on July 26, and Dark on July 27. Each previously released single represents one of the album's acts, as "Sumo" represents Light, "Clout Cobain" represents Gray, and "Percs" represents Dark, which come together cohesively to form Ta13oo.

=== 2019–2021: Zuu, 13lood In + 13lood Out, and Unlocked ===
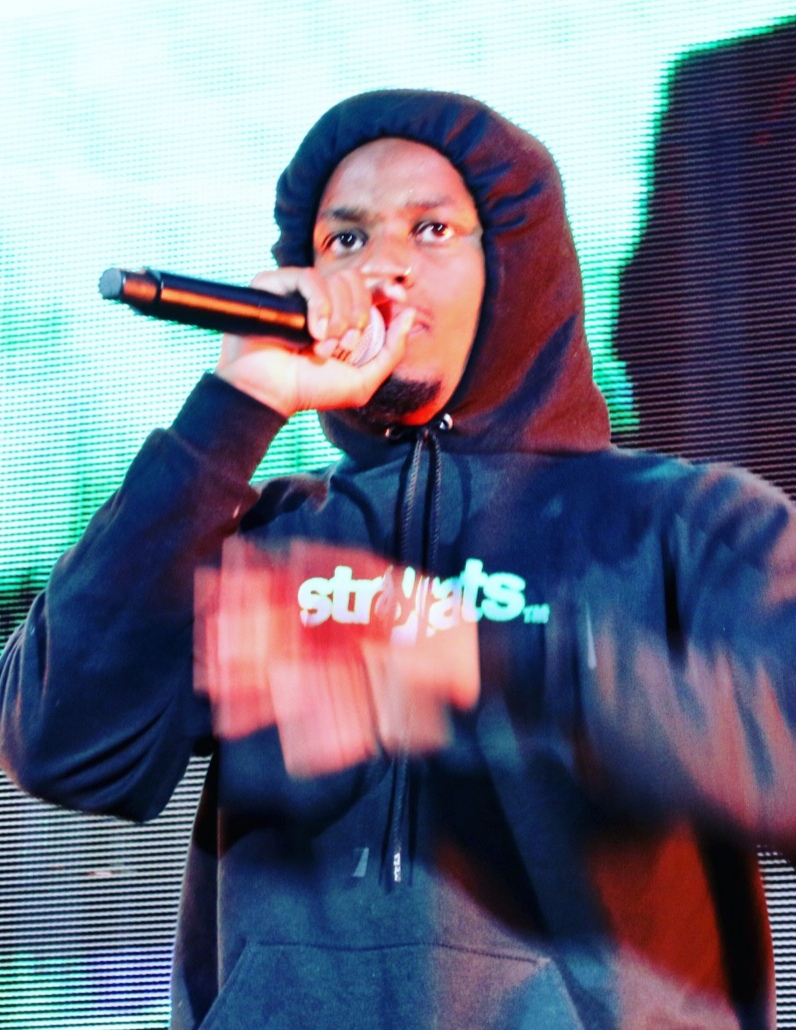
Curry in 2019

On February 14, 2019, Curry performed a cover of "Bulls on Parade" by Rage Against the Machine on the Australian radio station Triple J as part of Like a Version, which was met with widespread acclaim. His cover went on to place 5th on that year's Triple J Hottest 100 countdown.

On May 8, Curry released a track, titled "Ricky", as his first single since the release of Ta13oo. The song is titled after his father, whom the song is inspired by. On May 22, Curry released a second single, titled "Speedboat", and announced that his next album, Zuu, would be released on May 31.

On July 15, Curry made his television debut on The Tonight Show Starring Jimmy Fallon, performing a medley of "Ricky" and "Wish", from his album, Zuu. He also revealed that he had cut his signature dreadlocks.

On July 24, Curry joined Germ, City Morgue, Trash Talk, Shoreline Mafia, Night Lovell, Pouya, and Turnstile on a nationwide tour, titled "Grey Day Tour", a tour of which was created by the hip-hop duo $uicideboy$. The tour was completed almost a month later on August 23.

On November 13, Curry and Glass Animals released a track, titled "Tokyo Drifting", as a single leading into the August 2020 release of Glass Animals' album, named Dreamland.

On January 6, 2020, Curry released a project, titled 13lood 1n + 13lood Out, featuring fellow rappers Ghostemane, Xavier Wulf, ZillaKami, and AK of The Underachievers. The project was initially announced in November 2018.

On February 7, Curry released Unlocked, an EP collaboration with Kenny Beats. The release was accompanied with an animated short film. In August 2020, Curry was featured on the soundtrack to the Madden NFL 21 game, on the song "Lemonade", with singer Yungblud. In October 2020, Curry was featured on $NOT's track "Sangria".

On March 5, 2021, Curry released Unlocked 1.5, a remix of his previous collaboration with Kenny Beats. The remix album features new production from Robert Glasper, The Alchemist, Georgia Anne Muldrow, Sango, Jay Versace, Godmode, and Charlie Heat; as well as new guest features from Smino, Joey Bada$$, and Benny the Butcher, among others.

In June 2021, Curry appeared on FX Network's The Choe Show, hosted by David Choe.

In September 2021, Curry was featured on a song, "Bleach", a song being released by fellow American rapper ZillaKami from his debut album, Dog Boy.

Curry collaborated on the track "Dynasties and Dystopia" from the Netflix series Arcane, alongside Gizzle and Bren Joy.

=== 2022–2023: Melt My Eyez See Your Future ===
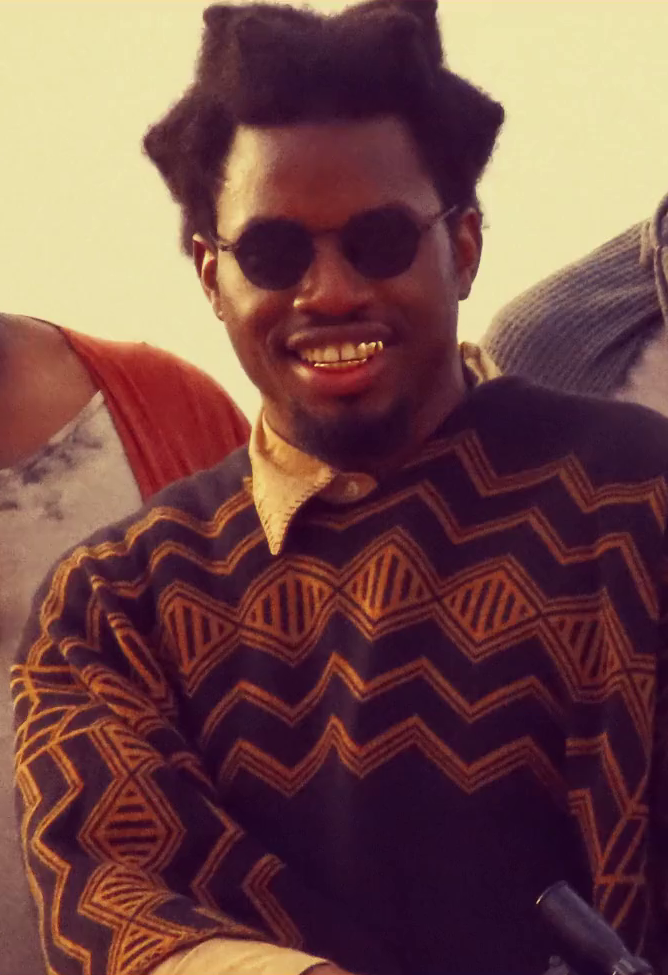
Curry on the set of his "Walkin" video in 2022

On January 5, 2022, the official trailer for Curry's fifth studio album, titled Melt My Eyez See Your Future, was uploaded to his YouTube channel. It was revealed that the album would contain guest appearances from artists such as T-Pain, 6lack, Slowthai, Rico Nasty, J.I.D, and Thundercat, among others. Curry said the project would feature a new, more mature sound, different from his previous works: "Y'all are not going to hear the same type of Denzel anymore." On January 24, a single, titled "Walkin", along with a Western-inspired music video directed by Adrian Villagomez, was released. Curry also said the album "is made up of everything that I couldn't [include] on Ta13oo or Imperial because I was going through depression [and] anger issues", and would take inspiration from traditional hip-hop, drum and bass, trap, poetry, and jazz. The same day, a North American and European tour promoting the album (with guest acts Kenny Mason, Mike Dimes, Redveil, and PlayThatBoiZay) was announced. On February 24, Curry released another single from the upcoming album, "Zatoichi" featuring Slowthai. It was accompanied by a music video also directed by Adrian Villagomez. On March 18, Curry announced the album would be released on March 25. On March 21, a third single, "Troubles" featuring T-Pain, was released along with a music video. The album was released on March 25. It debuted at number 51 on the Billboard 200 chart, and at number 23 on the Billboard Top R&B/Hip-Hop Albums chart.

Curry recorded a song featuring rapper Reason, "1st Quarter", as a contribution to Apple Music's "collection of exclusively commissioned new songs from Black creatives", titled Juneteenth 2022: Freedom Songs. He commented: "It's an accomplishment to make it through the first quarter of my life. Especially as a Black man in America".

Curry's song featuring PlayThatBoiZay, "Let It All Hang Out", was included in Elvis—a biographical movie about Elvis Presley that premiered in June 2022—as well as on the movie's soundtrack album.

On June 24, a collaboration between Dot da Genius, JID, Curry, and Kid Cudi, titled "Talk About Me", was released, along with a music video directed by Cole Bennett.

On June 29, Curry performed an NPR Tiny Desk Concert. On July 21, he performed "Walkin" on The Tonight Show Starring Jimmy Fallon.

On September 30, Curry released Melt My Eyez See Your Future (The Extended Edition). The album features reimagined versions of songs from the original album with live instrumentation, performed by the Cold Blooded Soul Band, from which performed with Curry on his NPR Tiny Desk Concert and The Tonight Show performance.

On May 5, 2023, Curry released a now Spotify-exclusive live project Live At Electric Lady, which featured new versions of Melt My Eyez songs and a rendition of Erykah Badu's "Didn't Cha Know" with Bilal.

=== 2024–present: King of the Mischievous South and the Scythe ===
In May 2024, Curry announced a new project by debuting a photo of cassette tape on his social media. In June, Curry announced the project was titled King of the Mischievous South Vol. 2 and debuted the lead single "Hot One" featuring TiaCorine and ASAP Ferg. The second single "Black Flag Freestyle" was subsequently released on June 21, 2024. The complete album was released on July 19, 2024, and is a sequel to Curry's third mixtape King of the Mischievous South Vol. 1 Underground Tape 1996 (2012).

Curry was featured on JPEGMafia's ninth album, I Lay Down My Life For You, appearing on the track, "JPEGUltra!", released on August 1.

On October 30, Curry announced the mixtape would be re-released on November 15, as an album simply, titled King of the Mischievous South with five additional tracks. He also released the single, "Still in the Paint" (featuring Lazer Dim 700 and Bktherula), that day. On November 14, he released another single, "Got Me Geeked". He embarked on the Mischievous South Tour with guests Kenny Mason, 454, and Clip, from February 21, 2025, to July 9, 2025.

On January 22, 2026, Curry announced the formation of a new hip-hop group, called the Scythe, with him, ASAP Ferg, TiaCorine, Bktherula, and Key Nyata as members. The group was created as an homage to southern hip-hop acts. Curry announced the Scythe's debut mixtape, titled Strictly 4 the Scythe, would be released on March 6, with guest appearances from Juicy J, Smino, and Rich the Kid, among others. The lead single, "Lit Effect", featuring Bktherula and Lazer Dim 700, was released the same day. The following month, Curry shared a new collaborative single with Knocked Loose, entitled "Hive Mind". Two more singles from Strictly 4 the Scythe were released: "The Scythe", featuring TiaCorine and Ferg, and "Mutt That Bih", featuring 1900Rugrat and Key Nyata.

In April 2026, the Glass Animals and Curry song "Tokyo Drifting" was broadcast from space during the Artemis II mission.

Curry released II, a collaborative album with Kenneth Blume, on August 21, 2026.

== Artistry ==
Curry's music is influenced by a variety of artists, genres, and art forms. Some of his greatest sources of inspiration are anime, video games, and martial arts. Some musicians who have been credited with inspiring Curry include MF Doom, André 3000, DMX, Kanye West, the Roots, Kid Cudi, Nirvana, and Trick Daddy, as well as Southern hip-hop in general.

Curry is best known for his aggressive, raw sound, "gritty" lyricism, and high-energy music, but also praised for his versatility. He has been acknowledged as a figure who "helped pioneer" SoundCloud rap and called "an artist who pushes the boundaries of [hip-hop]".

== Personal life ==
On February 27, 2014, Curry's brother, Treon "Tree" Johnson, died as a result of complications after being tased by the police in Hialeah, Florida. Officers responded to an emergency call made by a man claiming that Johnson was beating two dogs with a metal pipe. Officers then employed physical force, pepper spray, and a taser in an attempt to restrain Johnson. He succumbed to his wounds, and he ultimately died after being transported to Jackson Memorial Hospital. His family argued that the incident was a case of police brutality. Curry has spoken about Johnson's death and police brutality in interviews and in his music. One example of this is the lyric "Cops killing blacks when the whites do the most" in his song "The Last". He also expressed this theme in his cover of "Bulls on Parade" by Rage Against the Machine.

In January 2021, Curry discovered that he is related to St. Louis rapper Smino through the discovery of a shared uncle.

In 2022, Curry signed onto the Musicians For Palestine pledge, refusing to perform in Israel following the 2021 Israel–Palestine crisis. In November 2023, Curry signed an open letter calling for a ceasefire in the Gaza war and an end to the blockade of the Gaza Strip. In November 2025, Curry removed his music catalog from streaming services in Israel, as part of the No Music For Genocide movement.

== Discography ==
Studio albums

- Nostalgic 64 (2013)
- Imperial (2016)
- Ta13oo (2018)
- Zuu (2019)
- Melt My Eyez See Your Future (2022)

Collaborative albums

- II (with Kenny Beats) (2026)

== Filmography ==
=== Video games ===
Year	Title	Voice role	Ref.
2026	Grand Theft Auto VI	DWNPLY	

== Tours ==
=== Headlining ===
- Bow Down Tour with Deniro Farrar (2014)
- 2055: The U.L.T Experience with SDotBrady, J. K. The Reaper and Allan Kingdom (2015)
- Black Metal Terrorist Tour with Boogie (2016)
- Ta13oo Tour (2018)
- Melt My Eyez Tour (2022)
- GreyDay (2024)
- Mischievous South Tour (2025)
- Hive Mind Tour with Knocked Loose (2026)

=== Supporting ===
- Joey Bada$$ – World Domination Tour (2015)
- Illegal Civilization – Illegal Civ Cinema Tour with Show Me the Body, Trash Talk (2017)
- Run the Jewels – Run the World Tour (2017)
- A$AP Ferg – Mad Man Tour (2018)
- $uicideboy$ – GreyDay Tour (2019)
- Billie Eilish – When We All Fall Asleep Tour (2019)
- Kid Cudi – To The Moon Tour (2022)
- Deftones – EU/UK Tour 2026 (2026)

== Awards and nominations ==
Year	Award	Category	Work	Result	Ref.
2027	Grammy Awards	Best Metal Performance	"Hive Mind" (with Knocked Loose)	Nominated	
