= Nostalgic 64 =

Studio album by Denzel Curry
- Released: September 3, 2013
- Recorded: 2012–13
- Genre: Hip hop
- Length: 45:49
- Label: C9; L&E
- Producer: Mark "MarkMC9" Maturah; Bladley "Poshstronaut" Chatman; Rem; Alden Volney; Ronny J; Bodega Creative Co.; Klvn Tyler; Nuri; Steven A. Clark; J Green; Freebase; Denzel Curry; Lofty305; Sydney in Theory

Denzel Curry chronology
Mental Vendetta (2012)	Nostalgic 64 (2013)	32 Zel/Planet Shrooms (2015)

Singles from Nostalgia 64
- 1. "Threatz" Released: March 11, 2013; 2. "Zone 3" Released: December 8, 2014

Professional ratings
Review scores
Source	Rating
AbsolutePunk	8.5/10
Consequence of Sound	B

Nostalgic 64 is the debut studio album by American rapper Denzel Curry. It was released on September 3, 2013.

== Production ==
Producers who contributed to this album include Rem, Ronny J, MarkMC9, Poshstronaut, Klvn Tyler, Nuri, Steven A. Clark, J Green, Freebase, Lofty305 and Sydneyintheory

== Critical reception ==
Nostalgic 64 received widespread critical acclaim upon its release. Mike Madden from Pitchfork Magazine listed it as one of the top 10 albums of 2013 with Threatz listed as the top individual track as well. Lee Castro of Miami New Times called it "one of the best rap projects to come out of Miami in 2013".

== Track listing ==
Credits adapted from Denzel Curry's SoundCloud official account.

No.	Title	Writer(s)	Producer(s)	Length
1.	"Intro"	Denzel Curry	Rem; Alden Volney^{[a]}	0:52
2.	"Zone 3"	Curry; Ronald Spence, Jr.	Ronny J; MarkMC9; POSHstronaut	3:15
3.	"Parents"	Curry	Rem; Bodega Creative Co.^{[a]}	3:02
4.	"Dark & Violent" (featuring J.K. the Reaper and Nell)	Curry	POSHstronaut; Klvn Tyler	4:43
5.	"Threatz" (featuring Yung Simmie and Robb Bank$)	Curry; Andrew Thomas; Richard Burrell; Spence, Jr.	Ronny J	3:09
6.	"Mystical Virus, Pt. 3: The Scream" (featuring Lil Ugly Mane and Mike G)	Curry; Travis Miller; Michael Griffin II; Spence, Jr.	Ronny J; POSHstronaut; Bodega Creative Co.^{[a]}	4:23
7.	"Widescreen"	Curry	Nuri	3:13
8.	"N64"	Curry	POSHstronaut; Nuri	3:25
9.	"Like Me" (featuring Steven A. Clark)	Curry; Clark	Clark; Rem^{[a]}	5:28
10.	"Talk That Shit"	Curry	J GREEN	2:52
11.	"Benz"	Curry	Freebase	3:11
12.	"Denny Cascade"	Curry	Freebase; POSHstronaut; Curry	4:01
13.	"A Day in the Life of Denzel Curry, Pt. 2"	Curry; Robert Thompson; Gord Zajac; C. H. Greenblatt	Lofty305; Sydney In Theory^{[a]}	4:08
Total length:				45:49

Notes

- ^{^[a]} signifies an additional producer.

=== Sample Credits ===
- "Zone 3" contains samples of "Choky Choke", performed by DJ Sound.
- "N64" contains interpolations of "C.R.E.A.M.", performed by Wu-Tang Clan.
- "Talk That Shit" contains interpolations of "Versace", performed by Migos and interpolations of "Strictly 4 My R.V.I.D.X.R.Z.", performed by Denzel Curry.
- "A Day in the Life of Denzel Curry, Pt. 2" contains samples of the Billy & Mandy episode "Attack of the Clowns".
- ”Denny Cascade” contains interpolations of “Gliding Through feat. spaceghostpurrp & Robb Banks” performed by sydneyintheory
