= Loma Vista Recordings =

American record label

- Parent company: Concord (2014-2026); BMG Rights Management (2026-present)
- Founded: 2012; 14 years ago
- Founder: Tom Whalley
- Distributor: Universal Music Group
- Genre: Various
- Country of origin: United States
- Location: Beverly Hills, California
- Official website: www.lomavistarecordings.com

Loma Vista Recordings is a record label founded by Tom Whalley, former chairman and CEO of Warner Bros. Records and Executive of A&R at Interscope Records. The label was initially a joint venture with Republic Records and is based in Beverly Hills and Brooklyn.

In July 2014, the label announced it had changed strategic partners and was now part of Concord Music Group.

Loma vista is a Spanish phrase that roughly translates to hill view in English.

== Label roster ==
=== Current artists ===
- Andrew Bird
- Castle Rat
- Chelsea Wolfe
- Common
- David Foster and Katharine McPhee
- Denzel Curry
- Ecca Vandal
- Ghost
- Health
- HiTech
- Iggy Pop
- Indigo De Souza
- Killer Mike
- Korn
- Local Natives
- Manchester Orchestra
- Margo Price
- Mastodon
- Mavi
- Meechy Darko
- Militarie Gun
- Rise Against
- Robert Glasper
- Sampa the Great
- Show Me the Body
- Skegss
- Sleater-Kinney
- Soccer Mommy
- St. Vincent
- Vince Staples
- Vundabar

=== Former artists ===
- Action Bronson
- Alice Glass
- Cut Copy
- Damian Marley
- Grey Daze
- Injury Reserve
- Little Dragon
- Marilyn Manson
- PlayThatBoiZay
- Rhye
- Soundgarden
- Spoon
- Sylvan Esso

== Awards ==
In 2013, the label received its first Grammy Nomination for the Django Unchained soundtrack released in December 2012.

In 2014, the label received two Grammy Nominations for St. Vincent's self-titled album (Best Alternative Music Album) and Little Dragon's Nabuma Rubberband (Best Dance / Electronic Album). The former won the Grammy at the 2015 ceremony, making St. Vincent the first female solo artist to win in the Best Alternative Music Album category since Sinéad O'Connor in 1991.

Ghost won a Grammy for Best Metal Performance for its song "Cirice" in 2016.

Sylvan Esso was nominated for a Best Dance Album Grammy in 2017 for their album What Now.

At the 61st Annual Grammy Awards, St. Vincent's Masseduction won the award for Best Recording Package and Best Rock Song for its title track. It was also nominated for Best Alternative Music Album.

In 2024, Killer Mike swept the hip-hop category at the 66th Grammy Awards, winning for his single "Scientists & Engineers" (featuring Andre 3000) and his album Michael.
