= King of the Mischievous South Vol. 2 =

2024 mixtape by Denzel Curry

Mixtape by Denzel Curry
- Released: July 19, 2024
- Genre: Memphis rap; Southern hip-hop
- Length: 34:29
- Label: PH; Loma Vista
- Producer: 187; 1xydra; Business Boi; Denzel Curry; Charlie Heat; Darkboy; Kwes Darko; FnZ; Hollywood Cole; Ilykimchi; Nick Leon; Madd World; Mickey De Grand IV; Montag Da Leadah; Muddy; Oogie Mane; Julian Menkin; Poshstronaut; Derelle Rideout; RicoRunDat; SkipOnDaBeat

Denzel Curry chronology
Melt My Eyez See Your Future (2022)	King of the Mischievous South Vol. 2 (2024)	Strictly 4 the Scythe (2026)

Singles from King of the Mischievous South Vol. 2
- 1. "Hot One" Released: June 5, 2024; 2. "Black Flag Freestyle" Released: June 25, 2024; 3. "Hoodlumz" Released: July 16, 2024

Repackage album cover
- King of the Mischievous South cover

Singles from King of the Mischievous South
- 1. "Still in the Paint" Released: October 30, 2024

King of the Mischievous South Vol. 2 (shortened to KOTMS II) is the first commercial mixtape (seventh overall) by American rapper Denzel Curry, released on July 19, 2024, via PH Recordings and Loma Vista. The mixtape features guest appearances from Kingpin Skinny Pimp, Key Nyata, Maxo Kream, TiaCorine, ASAP Ferg, That Mexican OT, 2 Chainz, Mike Dimes, Kenny Mason, Project Pat, Ty Dolla Sign, Juicy J, Armani White, Ski Mask the Slump God, ASAP Rocky, and PlayThatBoiZay. It serves as the sequel to his third mixtape King of the Mischievous South Vol. 1 Underground Tape 1996 (2012), and also serves as the follow-up to Curry's fifth studio album, Melt My Eyez See Your Future (2022).

On October 30, Curry announced a deluxe edition of the mixtape, which he described as an album, with five additional tracks, it was released on November 15 as King of the Mischievous South; it includes additional guest appearances from Duke Deuce, Slim Guerilla, 454, Sauce Walka, Bktherula, and Lazer Dim 700.

== Release ==
"Sked" was originally released as a standalone single on September 14, 2023, without a Project Pat verse. Curry announced King of the Mischievous South Vol. 2 on June 5, 2024, with the lead single "Hot One" featuring TiaCorine and ASAP Ferg. "Black Flag Freestyle", featuring That Mexican OT, was subsequently released on June 21, 2024, as the second single. The third single, "Hoodlumz" featuring PlayThatBoiZay and ASAP Rocky, was released on July 16, 2024. The mixtape was released on July 19, 2024. An expanded edition was released on November 15, 2024.

== Critical reception ==
Professional ratings
Aggregate scores
Source	Rating
AnyDecentMusic?	6.6/10
Metacritic	74/100
Review scores
Source	Rating
AllMusic	4/5 stars
Beats Per Minute	81%
DIY	3.5/5 stars
Dork	3/5 stars
The Independent	7/10
Kerrang!	3/5
The Observer	3/5 stars
Slant	3.5/5 stars
Sputnikmusic	3.5/5

According to the review aggregator Metacritic, King of the Mischievous South Vol. 2 received "generally favorable reviews" based on a weighted average score of 74 out of 100 from 8 critic scores. Aggregator AnyDecentMusic? gave it 6.6 out of 10, based on their assessment of the critical consensus.

Steve Erickson concludes his review for Slant stating: "Having long since proven his skill as a lyricist, Curry is more concerned with having a good time here. And that also makes for a hell of a good listen." Tom Morgan of DIY wrote that the album was "back-to-basics" and "a bit of a sideways step." Ciaran Picker's review for Dork concludes: "Maybe it is a slightly predictable record, but that doesn’t make it any less an impressive and sonically sound album." On the album's lyrics, Sputnikmusic's review states: "Curry opts for a shrewd and understated angle throughout the record's lyrical content that I appreciated more and more as I continued to pore over his bars." Damien Morris of The Observer writes: "There’s something about his cheeky cadence that’s annoyingly irresistible, no matter how lazy his verses get." Writing the review for Kerrang!, Sam Law concludes that "as a subversive stopgap, KOTMS2 sure hits the spot." John Wohlmacher of Beats Per Minute wrote that the album was "fun" and "infectious."

Reviewing the album for AllMusic, David Crone commented that in, "Taking notes from his original Raider Klan sound, [Curry] uses this mixtape to return to styles he's used throughout his career, evoking a specific nostalgia for the sound he first came up with."

== Track listing ==
Credits adapted from Apple Music, Tidal, and the ASCAP Repertory where applicable.

King of the Mischievous South Vol. 2 track listing
No.	Title	Writer(s)	Producer(s)	Length
1.	"KOTMS II Intro" (featuring Kingpin Skinny Pimp)	Denzel Curry; Ryan DeGrandy; Derrick Hill	Montag da Leadah; Mickey De Grand IV	0:31
2.	"Ultra Shxt" (featuring Key Nyata)	Curry; Kishaun Bailey; DeGrandy; Hill; Adrian Porterfield	Montag da Leadah; Mickey De Grand IV; DJ Qeys^{[a]}; Lowkey^{[a]}; Nick Leon^{[a]}; Poshstronaut^{[a]}	3:16
3.	"Set It" (featuring Maxo Kream)	Curry; Emekwanem Biosah Jr.; Hill; Jordan Ortiz; Jacques Richard	Darkboy; Oogie Mane	2:40
4.	"Hot One" (featuring TiaCorine and ASAP Ferg)	Curry; Isaac de Boni; Darold Brown; Edgar Ferrera; Hill; Michael Mulé; Porterfield; Tia Thompson-Shultz	SkipOnDaBeat; FnZ; DJ Qeys^{[m]}; Julian Menkin^{[m]}; Leon^{[m]}; Poshstronaut^{[m]}	2:45
5.	"Black Flag Freestyle" (featuring That Mexican OT)	Curry; Virgil René Gazca; Hill; Rashad Johnson; Rickie Thomas; Wojciech Kilar	Kill; Payday; 187	3:27
6.	"Headcrack Interlude" (featuring Kingpin Skinny Pimp)	Curry; Hill; Nicholas Leone; Menkin; Andre Robertson	Derelle Rideout; Business Boi; RicoRunDat; Muddy; Leon^{[a]}; Poshstronaut^{[a]}	0:29
7.	"G'z Up" (featuring 2 Chainz and Mike Dimes)	Curry; Kevin da Silva; Tauheed Epps; Michael Goode; A. Kanda; Rideout	Rideout; Business Boi; RicoRunDat; Muddy	3:33
8.	"Lunatic Interlude"	Paul Beauregard; Hill; Leone; Jordan Houston; Menkin	Leon; Menkin; Poshstronaut	0:39
9.	"Sked" (featuring Kenny Mason and Project Pat)	Curry; Ernest Brown; Edwin Green; J. Houston; Patrick Houston; Beauregard	Charlie Heat	3:42
10.	"Choose Wisely Intermission" (featuring Kingpin Skinny Pimp)	Curry; J. Houston; DeGrandy	Mickey De Grand IV	0:37
11.	"Cole Pimp" (featuring Ty Dolla Sign and Juicy J)	Curry; Eugene Page; William Page; J. Houston; Tyrone Griffin Jr.; Lily Honigberg; Ashton Sellars; Elijah Fox-Peck	Hollywood Cole; Elijah Fox^{[a]}	3:38
12.	"Wishlist" (featuring Armani White)	Curry; W. Hutch; Enoch Tolbert	Madd World	3:06
13.	"Hit the Floor" (featuring Ski Mask the Slump God)	Curry; Stokeley Goulborne; Ortiz; Nelida Yew	Oogie Mane; Ilykimchi; 1xydra	3:26
14.	"Hoodlumz" (featuring ASAP Rocky and PlayThatBoiZay)	Curry; Hill; J. Houston; Isaiah Loubeau; Rakim Mayers; Nigel Mullaney; Jonathan Jowett; Kwes Darko	Darko	2:09
15.	"KOTMS II Outro" (featuring Kingpin Skinny Pimp)	Curry; Hill	Curry	0:31
Total length:				34:29

King of the Mischievous South - reissue additional track listing
No.	Title	Writer(s)	Producer(s)	Length
5.	"Act a Damn Fool" (featuring Duke Deuce and Slim Guerilla)	Curry; Patavious Isom; Stuart Goldsmith	FnZ	3:43
11.	"Got Me Geeked"	Curry	Powers Pleasant; Ben10k	2:32
13.	"P.O.P" (featuring Key Nyata and Sauce Walka)	Curry; Albert Mondane; Kishaun Bailey	Madworld; Mickey De Grand IV^{[m]}	4:02
14.	"Anotha Late Nite" (featuring 454)	Curry; Willie Wilson	454; Mickey De Grand IV^{[m]}	2:56
17.	"Still in the Paint" (featuring Bktherula and Lazer Dim 700)	Curry; Brooklyn Rodriguez; Devokeyous Hamilton; Lexus Lewis	Charlie Heat; Mickey De Grand IV^{[m]}	3:53
Total length:				51:10

=== Notes ===
- ^{^[a]} indicates an additional producer
- ^{^[m]} indicates music production
- In the reissue, normal tracks 5–11 are pushed down one spot, tracks 12–13 are pushed down three spots, and tracks 14–15 are pushed down four spots. For example, "Black Flag Freestyle" would become track 6, "Wishlist" would become track 15, and "Hoodlumz" would become track 18.
- "Choose Wisely Intermission" is not present on the reissue.

== Personnel ==
- Denzel Curry – vocals
- Ruairi O'Flaherty – mastering
- Nate Burgess – mixing, engineering
- Kingpin Skinny Pimp – vocals (tracks 1, 6, 8, 10, 15)
- Key Nyata – vocals (track 2)
- Maxo Kream – vocals (track 3)
- TiaCorine – vocals (track 4)
- ASAP Ferg – vocals (track 4)
- That Mexican OT – vocals (track 5)
- 2 Chainz – vocals (track 7)
- Mike Dimes – vocals (track 7)
- Kenny Mason – vocals (track 9)
- Project Pat – vocals (track 9)
- Ty Dolla Sign – vocals (track 11)
- Juicy J – vocals (track 11)
- Armani White – vocals (track 12)
- Ski Mask the Slump God – vocals (track 13)
- PlayThatBoiZay – vocals (track 14)
- ASAP Rocky – vocals (track 14)

== Charts ==
Chart performance for King of the Mischievous South Vol. 2
Chart (2024)	Peak position
Australian Albums (ARIA)	84
Australian Hip Hop/R&B Albums (ARIA)	19
Belgian Albums (Ultratop Flanders)	162
New Zealand Albums (RMNZ)	31
UK Album Downloads (OCC)	79
UK R&B Albums (OCC)	2
US Billboard 200	81
US Independent Albums (Billboard)	14
US Top R&B/Hip-Hop Albums (Billboard)	26
