= Strictly 4 the Scythe =

2026 mixtape by the Scythe

Mixtape by Denzel Curry and the Scythe
- Released: March 6, 2026
- Genre: Southern hip-hop
- Length: 29:38
- Labels: PH; Loma Vista
- Producers: BeautifulMvn; Bnyx; Bryvn; IlyKimchi; Iloveit!; Jack LoMastro; Oogie Mane; SkipOnDaBeat; Swaggyono; Vernon Hill; Yalabear

Denzel Curry chronology
King of the Mischievous South Vol. 2 (2024)	Strictly 4 the Scythe (2026)	II (2026)

ASAP Ferg chronology
Flip Phone Shorty - Strictly for Da Streetz Vol. 1 (2025)	Strictly 4 the Scythe (2026)

TiaCorine chronology
Corinian (2025)	Strictly 4 the Scythe (2026)

Bktherula chronology
Lucy (2025)	Strictly 4 the Scythe (2026)

Key Nyata chronology
Don't Fold, Vol. 2 (2025)	Strictly 4 the Scythe (2026)

Singles from Strictly 4 the Scythe
- 1. "Lit Effect" Released: January 22, 2026; 2. "The Scythe" Released: February 17, 2026; 3. "Mutt That Bih" Released: March 3, 2026

Strictly 4 the Scythe is the first collaborative mixtape by the American hip-hop supergroup the Scythe, released on March 6, 2026, under PH and Loma Vista Recordings. Led by Denzel Curry, the collective consists of rappers ASAP Ferg, Bktherula, Key Nyata, and TiaCorine. Guest artists include Juicy J, Smino, 454, Luh Tyler, Rich the Kid, 1900Rugrat, SadBoi, and Lazer Dim 700. The mixtape follows Curry's previous project King of the Mischievous South Vol. 2 (2024), which featured all of the Scythe's members throughout the album. The conception of the mixtape began when Curry and record producer BeautifulMvn discussed on making a beat tape, evolving as fellow record producer Mike Will Made It recommended vocals on the project.

Strictly 4 the Scythe is a Southern hip-hop mixtape that embodies various genres including Memphis rap and Miami bass. With majority of the production produced by production collective Working on Dying, the mixtape highlights each member, with Curry playing a minimal role, and emphasizes themes including money and fraud. Announced in January 2026, the mixtape was promoted with three singles: "Lit Effect", "The Scythe", and "Mutt That Bih". The mixtape received mixed-to-positive reviews from music critics, who complimented the collective's energy and homage to Southern hip-hop, while criticizing its inconsistency. Commercially, the mixtape charted on two Billboard charts, two UK charts, two Australian charts, and the Scottish Albums chart.

== Background ==
On July 19, 2024, Curry released his commercial mixtape King of the Mischievous South Vol. 2 to positive reviews from music critics. Marketed as a return to his Memphis rap roots, the album featured guest appearances from Ferg, Bktherula, Key Nyata, and TiaCorine, among others. Following the mixtape, Ferg released two studio albums: Darold (2024) and Flip Phone Shorty - Strictly for Da Streetz Vol. 1 (2025), Bktherula released her studio album Lucy (2025), and TiaCorine released her studio album Corinian (2025).

Curry continued occasionally releasing singles, including "Bandoe" with Powers Pleasant, Meechy Darko, and Soulja Livin Tru in October 2024, "S.U." with IDK in February 2025, "Victory Lap Five" with Fred Again, Skepta, and several other rappers in July, "Him" for the film of the same name in September, and "Fake Jeezy" with Maxo Kream and JPEGMafia in January 2026.

== Production ==
Strictly 4 the Scythe originated when Curry visited BeautifulMvn's home-studio in Los Angeles to talk about the idea of a "seven-project rollout." Curry played him various "old-school tapes", discussing what would be on the project before the idea of a collective. The first tape made was a beat tape. When Mike Will Made It listened to the tape, he saw potential in the production, but recommended rappers on the beats. When Strictly 4 the Scythe began production, it was supposed to be solely by BeautifulMvn and Iloveit. "The Scythe" was the only track from the original tape that made it into the final mixtape. At the time, Curry and Ferg weren't featured on the track yet.

== Composition ==
=== Overall ===
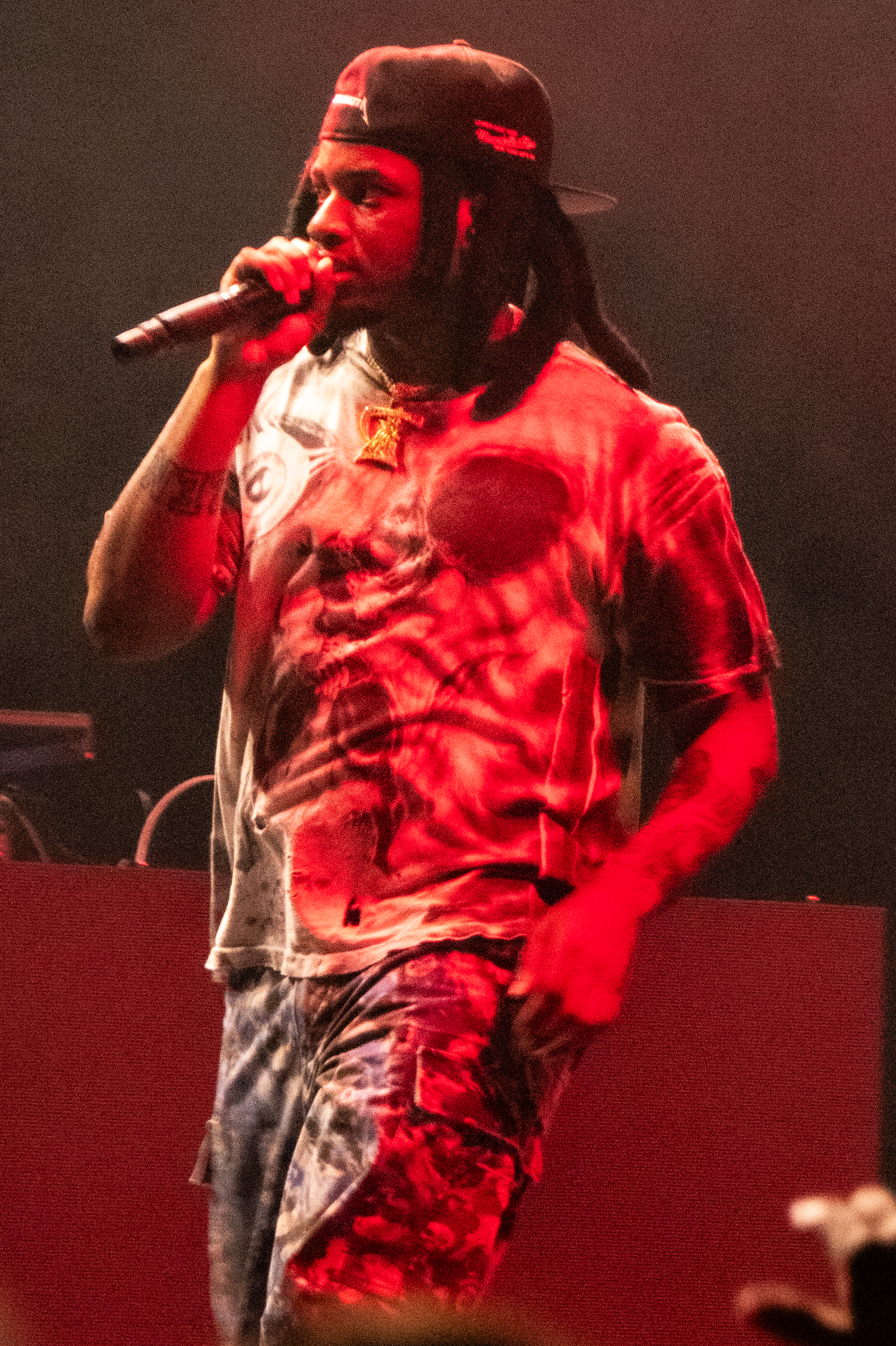
The Scythe is led by Denzel Curry (pictured in 2025), who appears on every track excluding "Tan".

Strictly 4 the Scythe is a Southern hip-hop mixtape with elements of bounce, crunk, electronica, Memphis rap, Miami bass, and phonk, containing eight tracks at a runtime of twenty-nine minutes. The production collective Working on Dying produces the majority of the project, with beats not just serving as a homage to Memphis rap, but combining multiple eras in various tracks, with the collective making sure to "leave an impact like their predecessors". Working on Dying member BeautifulMvn serves as an executive producer on the project, alongside Iloveit! and Curry himself. The mixtape leans experimental at times including the tracks "Hoopty" and "Up", emphasizing diverse sounds and textures. Guest artists include Juicy J, Smino, 454, Luh Tyler, Rich the Kid, 1900Rugrat, SadBoi, and Lazer Dim 700.

The project is credited by Kiana Fitzgerald of Consequence as a "love letter" to the Southern hip-hop scene in transformative glory, serving as a rebirth to his 2013 mixtape Strictly 4 My R.V.I.D.X.R.Z., recorded back in his Raider Klan days. In the collective's statement, the mixtape combines Curry's unique presence with "gritty Southern sounds" across eras. While Curry consistently appears throughout the mixtape, he plays a minimal role as he lets his other members stand out, with Bktherula and TiaCorine's "bold personality", Ferg's "bursts of energy", and Nyata's "impressive verses." The mixtape's musicals style sticks with a "low-frequency weight" under cracking percussion, ratting sub-bass, and keyboards in minor-key reminiscent of Three 6 Mafia's early work, lyrically based on money, fraud, and the repercussions of engaging the collective improperly.

=== Tracks ===
The high-adrenaline opening track, "The Scythe", begins with a statement not to mess with the collective on its anthemic chorus through Memphis rap-esque production under "ratting percussion and trunk-knocking low end" and a "four-on-the-floor beat" with comparison to "Tear da Club Up" (1995), featuring Curry, TiaCorine, and Ferg. In a press release, the latter revealed he was the one who conceptualized the track. The Bnyx-produced second track, "Lit Effect", shines with an "almost Mortal Kombat-like energy" akin to "spacey booming trap aesthetics" from Ferg's studio album Trap Lord (2013). Lyrically, Bktherula approaches the beat with "ice-cold composure", Lazer Dim 700 keeps the track consistent with a "drowsy, carefree verse" about pulling cards and aiming jabs at men who "enjoy bubble baths", and Curry admits that half of the audience still don't recognize him, raps about "saving money until it looks like pages", and finishes the track by finding weaknesses in the hip-hop game.

The third track, "Phony", leans into Memphis rap-style production with "organ stabs and stripped drum patterns" akin to Hypnotize Minds beats, featuring then-Three 6 Mafia member Juicy J. Throughout the track, Key Nyata raps about street posers who have "no reach beyond their own imagination." The track also marks a notable collaboration between an ASAP Mob member (Ferg) and a Raider Klan member (Key Nyata), who regularly feuded in the 2010s. Produced with Southern hip-hop-inspired drums, the fourth track, "Mutt That Bih", highlight Curry's "sharp intensity" as 1900Rugrat switches between melodic rap and "carefree flexes" on his verse and chorus in a humorous manner akin to Shaggy from Scooby-Doo. Lyrically, the track bases on chasing money over superficial friendships with a celebration of loyalty to dominance and success. Key Nyata raps about shrinking morality, including those who take Ozempic. Closing the track, he refuses to cross others who haven't. The fifth track, "Hoopty", is a track blending chipmunk soul and crunk, based on women twerking out of their car windows, idealizing with Southern hip-hop themes, as TiaCorine raps about spending "a stack on a white tee" and telling one to "spread their cheeks" without interruption, while Smino steps in with a "playful, silky verse".

On the sixth track, "You Ain't Gotta Lie", formed around Miami bass and a phonk-esque groove, Curry, with Florida-based artists Luh Tyler and 454, highlight themes of sex, spending, and "pretty feet", as the latter sings a hook about reminding a girl she can can go through "without pretending." The seventh track, "Tan", features humorous bars from Bktherula as her alias Rue Santan, such as inviting someone to see a Spider-Man film at 8 pm, then "head at 10", while the track bases on internet-based trap akin to Playboi Carti's self-titled mixtape (2017). The eighth tack, "Up", features Rich the Kid and SadBoi and dives into the mid-2010s emo rap scene, with the former reciting luxury nouns, Molly, vintage Chanel, Eliantte ice, and Lamborghinis, while the latter sings about "vibing and doing butterflies." Throughout the track, Ferg raps about a breakup, thoughts on reconciliation, and traveling to Santo Domingo from Atlanta to call her mind "the true cheat code", reflecting on their relationship.

== Promotion and release ==
On July 11, 2025, Curry and Ferg announced a collaborative mixtape during an undisclosed festival performance. Later evolving under the title Strictly 4 the Scythe, on January 20, 2026, Curry officially announced the mixtape, group lineup, and release date of March 6. He later released a press release that describes the mixtape as paying homage to Southern hip-hop scenes from Memphis, Houston, and Miami, further stating that the Scythe is "a family and a group". The Scythe marks Curry's first collective since the dissolution of Raider Klan in 2013, when it was announced in January 2026. The Scythe includes Georgia's Bktherula, North Carolina's TiaCorine, Key Nyata, and Ferg. Key Nyata was also in Raider Klan with Curry.

On January 22, 2026, the mixtape's lead single, "Lit Effect", was released, featuring Bktherula and Lazer Dim 700, and produced by Bnyx. On February 17, the mixtape's second single, "The Scythe", was released, featuring TiaCorine and Ferg. On March 3, the mixtape's third single, "Mutt That Bih", was released, featuring Key Nyata and 1900Rugrat. All singles were released with accompanying music videos directed by Ramon Castellanos. On March 6, Strictly 4 the Scythe was released through PH and Loma Vista Recordings. The mixtape was also released physically, sold through limited-edition "galaxy-colored" vinyl, CDs, and limited edition cassettes.

== Reception ==
Professional ratings
Review scores
Source	Rating
Consequence	B+
The Needle Drop	6/10 (Note: Specifically, Fantano rated it a "light to decent 6.")
NME	3/5 stars
Pitchfork	6.4/10
Ratings Game Music	76/100

Strictly 4 the Scythe received mixed-to-positive reviews from music critics. Kiana Fitzgerald of Consequence praised the mixtape, considering it as a marriage of "the past with the present," specifically Curry as a successor and pioneer in his circle. Ed Lindsay of Wordplay credited the mixtape's connection of Curry's early career to a newer generation of Southern hip-hop artists. Quincy of Ratings Game Music wrote a mostly positive review, praising the collective's dynamic energy and production, while mostly criticizing the mixtape's short length.

Dylan Green of Pitchfork credited Curry's ability to hold the collective together, uniting various artists in the Southern hip-hop landscape through cities with "low-stakes, high-energy fun", but criticized the mixtape's coherence. Kyann-Sian Williams of NME stated that while the mixtape is "chaotic, playful and packed with personality", not every track fits concisely, while meant to "make the chaos feel intentional." Anthony Fantano of The Needle Drop also stated that while there are highlights on the mixtape, it begins to "lose grit and energy" onto a weak finishing point, giving it a "light to decent six".

Upon release, Strictly 4 the Scythe reached number 19 on the Billboard Indie Store Album Sales chart and number 29 on the Top Album Sales chart. In the United Kingdom, it entered the UK Albums Sales chart and peaked at number four on the R&B Albums chart. In Australia, it entered the Australian Albums chart and peaked at number fifteen on the Hip-Hop/R&B Albums chart. It also entered the Scottish Albums chart.

== Track listing ==
No.	Title	Writer(s)	Producer(s)	Length
1.	"The Scythe" (with TiaCorine and ASAP Ferg)	Denzel Curry; Tia Thompson-Shults; Darold Ferguson, Jr.; Patrick Saint-Fort; K. Blocker; Bradley Chatman	BeautifulMvn; Jonnywood; DJ Qeys (Note: Additional producer); Poshstronaut	2:56
2.	"Lit Effect" (with Bktherula featuring Lazer Dim 700)	D. Curry; Brooklyn Rodriguez; Devokeyous Hamilton; Bryan Yepes; Benjamin Saint-Fort; Reyshod Curry	Bryvn; Bnyx	3:27
3.	"Phony" (with Key Nyata and ASAP Ferg featuring Juicy J)	D. Curry; Ferguson; Kishaun Bailey; Jordan Houston III; P. Saint-Fort; Jordan Ortiz; Nelida Yew; Enoch Tolbert	BeautifulMvn; Oogie Mane; IlyKimchi; Iloveit!	4:10
4.	"Mutt That Bih" (with Key Nyata featuring 1900Rugrat)	D. Curry; Bailey; Miles Spiel; Edgar Ferrera; Austin Chandler; Jackson LoMastro; Cyrick Palmer; Steven Ayala; A. Scott; I. Joseph	SkipOnDaBeat; Swaggyono; Jack LoMastro; Vernon Hill; Yalabear; Iloveit!	3:57
5.	"Hoopty" (with TiaCorine featuring Smino)	D. Curry; Thompson-Shults; Christopher Smith, Jr.; P. Saint-Fort; Chandler	BeautifulMvn; Iloveit!	3:45
6.	"You Ain't Gotta Lie" (featuring 454 and Luh Tyler)	D. Curry; Willie Wilson; Tyler Meeks; B. Saint-Fort; Christian Astrop; Blocker; Chatman; Isaiah Loubeau	Bnyx; Beau Nox; DJ Qeys; Poshstronaut	3:47
7.	"Tan" (performed by TiaCorine and Bktherula (Note: "Tan" is a remix of Bktherula's 2022 track of the same name.))	D. Curry; Thompson-Shults; Rodriguez; P. Saint-Fort; Ortiz; Yew; Chandler; Blocker; Chatman	BeautifulMvn; Oogie Mane; IlyKimchi; Iloveit!; DJ Qeys; Poshstronaut	3:30
8.	"Up" (with ASAP Ferg featuring Rich the Kid and SadBoi)	D. Curry; Ferguson; Dmitri Roger; Ebhoni Cato-O'Garro; P. Saint-Fort; Chandler	BeautifulMvn; Iloveit!	4:06
Total length:				29:38

== Charts ==
Chart performance for Strictly 4 the Scythe
Chart (2026)	Peak position
Australian Albums (ARIA)	91
Australian Hip Hop/R&B Albums (ARIA)	15
Scottish Albums (Official Charts)	74
UK Albums Sales (OCC)	81
UK R&B Albums (Official Charts)	4
US Indie Store Album Sales (Billboard)	19
US Top Album Sales (Billboard)	29
