= List of punk rap artists =

The following is a list of notable punk rap artists.

== # ==
- 6ix9ine

== A ==
- Abdu Ali

== B ==
- Backxwash
- Blackie
- Bob Vylan

== C ==
- Chief Keef
- Cities Aviv
- City Morgue

== D ==
- Danny Brown
- Dead Obies
- Death Grips
- Denzel Curry

== H ==
- Ho99o9

== J ==
- Jasiah
- JPEGMAFIA
- Joey Valence and Brae

== K ==
- Kevin Abstract
- Ken Carson

== L ==
- Lancey Foux
- Lil Peep
- Lil Pump
- Lil Uzi Vert
- Lil Wayne
- Lil Yachty

== M ==
- Mudrat

== N ==
- Nothing,Nowhere

== P ==
- Paris Texas
- P.O.S
- Public Enemy
- Playboi Carti

== R ==
- Rico Nasty

== S ==
- Show Me the Body
- Ski Mask the Slump God
- Slowthai
- Smokepurpp
- Soul Glo
- Suicideboys
- Swollen Members

== T ==
- Travis Scott

== W ==
- Waka Flocka Flame

== X ==
- XXXTENTACION

== Y ==
- Yeat
