= VIP (PlayThatBoiZay album) =

Studio album by PlayThatBoiZay
- Released: August 23, 2024
- Genres: Hip-hop; trap metal
- Length: 32:19
- Label: Loma Vista Recordings
- Producers: Derrickulous; Iloveit!; Kelvin Krash; Kwes Darko; Lito; Manny Laurenko; Powers Pleasant; Redveil; Rustoblak; Tweek Tune

PlayThatBoiZay chronology
| Girls Love Vampires (2020) | VIP (2024) | Florida Vamp Vol. 1 (2026) |

Singles from VIP
- 1. "Temple Run" Released: April 24, 2024; 2. "Mood Swings" Released: June 12, 2024; 3. "Lil Jit" Released: July 7, 2024; 4. "Hoodlumz" Released: July 16, 2024

Repackage album cover

Singles from Vampire Impersonating People
- 1. "Put It Down" Released: December 6, 2024

VIP is the debut studio album by American rapper PlayThatBoiZay, released on August 23, 2024, via Loma Vista Recordings. The album features guests such as Kenny Mason, Mike Dimes, Denzel Curry, ASAP Rocky, and JPEGMafia. It serves as a follow-up to Zay's second EP, Girls Love Vampires (2020)

In December, Zay announced a deluxe edition, with five additional songs, it was released on December 13 as Vampires Impersonating People; it includes additional guest appearances from ASAP Ferg, Hunter, and 03 Greedo.

== Background ==
The album was originally an EP, and made during 2020. Zay explained the inspiration for the album by saying,

“The whole inspiration for the project can be traced back to an awful heartbreak. I got my heart broken, and that’s where my mind was at.Then, when I had linked with Kwes Darko in 2020, that’s when we started making a tracklist. That was all I could talk about, so it was all natural. We made the album originally in 2020, and then I just been working on it, adding tracks. And you know, like making it to what it is today.”

== Release ==
"Lil Jit" was originally released as a standalone single on September 20, 2022, without the Kenny Mason verse. Zay released "Temple Run" on April 24, 2024. "Mood Swings" , featuring Mike Dimes, was released on June 12, 2024. A month later Zay released "Lil Jit" with the Kenny Mason verse. The fourth single, "Hoodlumz" featuring Denzel Curry and ASAP Rocky, was released on July 16, 2024. The album was released on August 23, 2024. An expanded edition was released on December 13, 2024.

== Critical reception ==
VIP got one review, being mediocre. RapReviews said, "The beats and the rhymes are not complacent on this album" and "It’s good but sometimes it’s a bit overwhelming".

VIP rating
Review scores
| Source | Rating |
|---|---|
| RapReviews | 65/100 |

== Track listing ==
Credits adapted from Apple Music and official music videos

All tracks are written by PlayThatBoiZay (Isaiah Loubeau) and produced by Kwes Darko, excepted where noted.

"VIP" track listing
| No. | Title | Writer(s) | Producer(s) | Length |
|---|---|---|---|---|
| 1. | "Shoota" | | | 3:12 |
| 2. | "Lil Jit" (featuring Kenny Mason) | Loubeau; R. Mayers; Denzel Curry | | 2:40 |
| 3. | "Mood Swings" (featuring Mike Dimes) | Loubeau; Michael Goode | | 3:00 |
| 4. | "Fvck 12" | Loubeau; T. Gaitor | | 0:30 |
| 5. | "Temple Run" | | Lito | 2:27 |
| 6. | "Hoodlumz" (featuring Denzel Curry and ASAP Rocky) | Loubeau; Hill; J. Houston; Curry; Rakim Mayers; Nigel Mullaney; Darko | | 2:10 |
| 7. | "Cut Up" | | Kelvin Krash | 2:28 |
| 8. | "Tick Tock" | | | 2:28 |
| 9. | "Pride" | | | 2:34 |
| 10. | "Hu$tle Man" | C. Kinchen; M. Cherilus; Curry | | 0:55 |
| 11. | "Yoo" (featuring JPEGMafia) | Loubeau; Barrington Hendricks | | 2:45 |
| 12. | "Beauty In Pain" | | | 2:20 |
| 13. | "Villain" | | | 1:56 |
| 14. | "The Weak" | | | 2:41 |
| Total length: | | | | 32:19 |

"Vampires Impersonating People" - reissue additional track listing
| No. | Title | Writer(s) | Producer(s) | Length |
|---|---|---|---|---|
| 15. | "Murda Gardens" (featuring Denzel Curry) | Loubeau; Curry | Powers Pleasant | 2:42 |
| 16. | "Put It Down" (featuring ASAP Ferg and Hunter) | Loubeau; Darold Ferguson Jr | RustoBlak | 2:27 |
| 17. | "Misunderstood" | Loubeau | RustoBlak | 1:18 |
| 18. | "Fight" | Loubeau | Redveil | 1:47 |
| 19. | "Ratatat" (featuring Denzel Curry and 03 Greedo) | Loubeau; Curry; Jason Jamal Jackson | Iloveit!; Derrickulous |
| Total length: | | | | 43:45 |
