= Wassup (song) =

2025 single by Joey Valence & Brae featuring JPEGMafia

Single by Joey Valence & Brae featuring JPEGMafia

from the album Hyperyouth
- Released: June 13, 2025
- Recorded: 2025
- Genre: Hip hop
- Length: 3:00
- Label: RCA Records

Joey Valence & Brae singles chronology
| "Clover" (2025) | "Wassup" (2025) | "Live Right" (2025) |

JPEGMafia singles chronology
| "Valentine's Day Freestyle '25" (2025) | "Wassup" (2025) | "Manic!" (2025) |

"Wassup" is a song by American hip-hop duo Joey Valence & Brae featuring American rapper JPEGMafia. It was released on June 13, 2025 by RCA Records as the lead single from Joey Valence & Brae's album Hyperyouth. The track combines aggressive beats and shouted vocals, and the lyrics feature the artists exchanging boastful, confrontational lines.

== Background and release ==
Joey Valence & Brae first hinted at a collaboration with JPEGMafia in May 2025, when JPEGMafia posted photos of the three artists together on social media. The song was publicly debuted at New York City's Governor's Ball festival in June 2025: during JPEGMafia's set on June 6, he brought out Joey Valence & Brae as surprise guests to perform the track live for the first time. In announcing the release, the duo described JPEGMafia as a "dream feature" whose energetic style "complements our vocals" and adds additional excitement to the track. "Wassup" was officially released as a single on June 13, 2025, through RCA Records. The track, which samples Playa Poncho's 1995 song "What Up, Whatz Up," was introduced as the first preview of the duo's new musical direction following their 2024 album No Hands.

== Composition and lyrics ==
"Wassup" is built around a driving, punk-rap–inspired beat with percussive group shouts and energetic instrumentation. The song opens with simple handclaps and shouted refrains, then ramps up with pounding drums, distorted horns, and aggressive synths. Joey Valence & Brae trade brash verses with JPEGMafia, each boasting of their success and skills. One verse features the lyrics "You rappers soft / You think you hard, you really not," demonstrating the song's confrontational tone. Critics noted the track's mix of old-school and new-school elements, Gabriel Bras Nevares from HotNewHipHop likened it to Joey Valence & Brae's earlier song "Packapunch" and to JPEGMafia's style, calling the result a balance of contemporary and classic hip hop.
