= Punk Tactics =

2023 studio album by Joey Valence & Brae

Studio album by Joey Valence & Brae
- Released: September 8, 2023
- Studio: Joey Valence's bedroom, State College, Pennsylvania
- Genre: Rap rock; punk rap; hardcore hip-hop; nerdcore
- Length: 31:16
- Label: JVB Records
- Producer: Joey Valence; Brae; Patrick Nissley

Joey Valence & Brae chronology
The Underground Sound (2022)	Punk Tactics (2023)	No Hands (2024)

Singles from Punk Tactics
- 1. "Punk Tactics" Released: April 15, 2022

Punk Tactics is the debut studio album by the American rap duo Joey Valence & Brae, self-released on September 8, 2023. It follows the virality of their 2022 single "Punk Tactics" and contains guest features from Logic and Bonjour Señor.

== Background and recording ==
Joseph Bertolino and Braedan Lugue met in 2021 when they were both freshmen at Pennsylvania State University. Their first single, "Crank It Up", was also in that year. After releasing an EP, The Underground Sound, in February 2022, they released the single "Punk Tactics" in April, which went viral. Many of the tracks on Punk Tactics were conceived outside of organized writing sessions; the duo once hung out for a week with their manager and ended up making the songs "Dance Now", "RN", and "Kill Bill".

== Production and composition ==
=== Overview ===
The album is primarily a rap rock and punk rap album. Joey Valence's production style is influenced by old-school hip-hop artists including the Beastie Boys, Heavy D, and Quad City DJ's and modern-day drum and bass and dance musicians. Video game music was also a large influence in the album, with Valence being inspired by game soundtracks such as ones from Wipeout 2097 and Ape Escape. The lyrics also reference or mention games such as Mortal Kombat, Super Mario Bros., and Super Smash Bros. Melee, in addition to other aspects of popular culture.

=== Songs ===
There are a variety of genres represented in Punk Tactics. "Gumdrop" ventures into hyperpop, and "Drop!!" and "Startafight" both have elements of rave. In "Tanaka 2", Logic enters for a highly technical verse.

== Critical reception ==
Professional ratings
Review scores
Source	Rating
Dork	4/5

The album received positive reviews. Finlay Holden of Dork rated the album a four out of five, noting the infectiousness of the duo's personality throughout the album. Luke Nuttall of The Soundboard noted the extreme similarity of the duo to the music of the Beastie Boys and the variety and playfulness of the production. He also stated that the duo's main distinction is their confidence.

== Track listing ==
All tracks are written by Joseph Bertolino and Braedan Lugue, except where noted. All tracks are produced by Joey Valence, except where noted.

Punk Tactics track listing
No.	Title	Writer(s)	Producer(s)	Length
1.	"Punk Tactics"	Joseph Bertolino; Braedan Lugue; Patrick Nissley	Joey Valence; Patrick Nissley	2:23
2.	"Drop!!"			2:05
3.	"Delinquent (Teen Titan)"			2:09
4.	"Watch Yo Step"		Joey Valence; Brae	2:20
5.	"Startafight"			3:07
6.	"Kill Bill"			2:26
7.	"Intermission"		Joey Valence; Brae	0:32
8.	"Gumdrop"	Bertolino; Lugue; Nissley; Lucas Banker		1:09
9.	"Dance Now"			2:10
10.	"RN"		Joey Valence; Brae	2:19
11.	"Tanaka 2" (featuring Logic)	Bertolino; Lugue; Sir Robert Hall II		3:11
12.	"Hooligang"			2:48
13.	"Street Pizza" (featuring Bonjour Señor)		Joey Valence; Brae	1:52
14.	"Club Sandwich"		Joey Valence; Brae	2:39
Total length:				31:16

Notes

- All tracks are stylized in all caps.

== Charts ==
Chart performance for Punk Tactics
Chart (2026)	Peak position
UK Independent Albums Breakers (OCC)	14
