= PlayThatBoiZay =

American rapper

- Loubeau in 2025

Background information
- Also known as: Lil Zayy; Florida Vamp
- Born: Isaiah Loubeau; September 15; Carol City, Florida
- Education: Miami Carol City Senior High School
- Genres: Southern hip hop; SoundCloud rap; rage; trap; trap metal; punk rap
- Occupations: Rapper; songwriter; record producer
- Instrument: Vocals
- Years active: 2017–present
- Labels: VIP$HIT; Loma Vista; VIPZ
- Website: playthatboizay.com

Isaiah Loubeau (born September 15), known professionally as PlayThatBoiZay, is an American rapper, songwriter, and record producer from Miami, Florida. He first gained traction from his collaborations with Denzel Curry. He released his debut studio album VIP on August 23, 2024.

== Early life ==
Isaiah Loubeau was born on September 15 in Carol City, Florida. He played football at Miami Carol City Senior High School and was classmates with Denzel Curry. They originally connected when Loubeau was working The Cheesecake Factory in 2015, and Curry, who was on a date there, encouraged Loubeau to start rapping.

== Career ==
=== 2017–2019: Career beginnings and breakthrough ===
Loubeau began releasing music on SoundCloud in 2017 under the name Lil Zayy, with his first release "Look at MY wrist", which is a remix of XXXTentacion, "Look at Me!".By 2018, he adopted his current stage name and released the EPs Lil Zayy and In My Feelins. Soon Loubeau caught the attention of record producer LoRd Lu C N, who reintroduced him to Denzel Curry.

On May 21, 2019, Loubeau released his debut mixtape Year 300 with guest appearance Seco Yayo and Anonymuz. Later on May 30, he had a guest appearance on Curry's 2019 album Zuu. On August 13, he released his second mixtape Vipzhit.

=== 2019-2021: Nocturnal and Girls Love Vampires ===
On October 31, 2019, Loubeau released "Poison Klan" featuring Denzel Curry and Anonymuz, and announced that his third EP Nocturnal, would be released on November 15. It's noted around this time that Loubeau linked up with producer Kwes Darko and started working on VIP.

On August 30, 2020, Loubeau released the single "Villianz", as his first single since the release of Nocturnal.

On December 3, Loubeau released "Lestat", named after the fictional character Lestat de Lioncourt. On December 10, he released "Ya Kidding Me?". A day later on the 11th he would release Girls Love Vampires as his fourth EP.

On February 1, 2021, Loubeau released the single "90's Baby". Loubeau would be featured on Quadeca second album From Me To You, appearing on the track "Work!", released on March 30. He later had six guest appearances on LoRd Lu C N fourth album TwoRaw4Albumz, being released on June 5.

=== 2024: VIP ===
On April 24, 2024, Loubeau released "Temple Run" as the first single of VIP. The second single "Mood Swings" was released June 12, featuring Mike Dimes. The third single "Lil Jit" featuring Kenny Mason was released on July 7, and he officially announced VIP. On July 16, Loubeau performed alongside Curry and ASAP Rocky on the song "Hoodlumz" from the former's album King of the Mischievous South Vol. 2, and was included on VIP. The complete album was released on August 23, 2024.

On December 6, 2024, Loubeau released "Put It Down" featuring ASAP Ferg and Hunter, announcing a deluxe to VIP called Vampires Impersonating People. He officially released Vampires Impersonating People on December 13, 2024.

=== 2025-present: Florida Vamp Vol. 1 and The Coven ===
In early January 2025, Loubeau released an official music video for "Shoota", and around this time Loubeau would leave Ultraground and Loma Vista. Around March 2025, Loubeau released a snippet of a remix of "Crank" by rapper Playboi Carti, bringing a Southern Florida vibe to the song. On April 8, Loubeau would released "#FuhNerdspend (Carnival Remix)" and "Florida Vamp (Crank Remix)" music video under the Panda Jam channel. "#FuhNerdspend" is diss track toward rapper Maxon Margiela, due to Margiela calling out Rolling Loud for having such rappers as Denzel Curry saying, "Who still listens to them in 2025". The name "Nerdspend" comes from Rolling Loud calling him a "Dollar Store Nettspend", and Loubeau calling him a nerd. On November 11, Loubeau was featured on the track "Keep On Goin" alongside Nell of his album No. 9.

On December 31, 2025, Loubeau would announce Florida Vamp Vol. 1. On January 9, 2026, Loubeau would release "Gang" exclusively on YouTube and SoundCloud, later added on streaming services on January 14. On February 13, he would release "Fuck My Brudda", and on February 20, he released "Jwett", both exclusively on YouTube. On February 27, he officially released Florida Vamp Vol. 1 as his fifth EP.

Loubeau would released his sixth EP Year 305 Pack on March 6. He later released the single "Four Five" on March 20. On April 6, Loubeau released a self-produced EP called Silver 233s, being his seventh EP.

Loubeau would go silent and stop releasing music. Then around late June, Loubeau would start dropping snippets of music on his social media hinting at a new project. Later on the 29th of August, Loubeau announced The Coven as his eighth EP, releasing on September 15, but got delayed to an unknown date.

== Artistry ==
Loubeau noted that his influence in music are ASAP Mob, SpaceGhostPurrp, XXXTentacion, Yung Pappy, and Chief Keef.

His music is mostly described as trap metal, punk rap, and rage, but all lot of his earlier work would be emo rap and plugg.

== Discography ==
=== Studio albums ===
Title	Details
VIP	Released: August 23, 2024; Label: Loma Vista; Formats: Digital download

=== Extended plays ===
Title	Details
Nocturnal	Released: November 15, 2019; Label: Self-released; Formats: Digital download
Girls Love Vampires	Released: December 11, 2020; Label: Self-released; Formats: Digital download
Year 305 Pack	Released: March 6, 2026; Label: Self-released; Formats: Digital download
Silver 233S	Released: April 6, 2026; Label: Self-released; Formats: Digital download
The Coven	Scheduled: 2026

=== Mixtapes ===
Title	Details
Year 300	Released: May 21, 2019; Label: VIP$HIT; Formats: Digital download
Vipzhit	Released: August 13, 2019; Label: VIP$HIT; Formats: Digital download
Florida Vamp Vol.1	Released: February 27, 2026; Label: VIPZ; Formats: Digital download

=== Singles ===
Title	Year	Album
"Lil Zayy in this Bitch"	2018	Non-album singles
"Look at MY Wrist"	2018	Non-album singles
"Poison Klan" (with Denzel Curry and Anonymuz)	2019	Nocturnal
"Lestat"	2020	Girls Love Vampires
"Ya Kidding Me?"	2020	Girls Love Vampires
"90's Baby"	2021	Non-album singles
"Bitin'"	2021	Non-album singles
"Gold Fangs"	2021	Non-album singles
"Lil Jit"	2022	Non-album singles
"Temple Run"	2024	VIP
"Mood Swings" (with Mike Dimes)	2024	VIP
"Lil Jit" (with Kenny Mason)	2024	VIP
"Put It Down" (with ASAP Ferg and Hunter)	2024	VIP
"Gang"	2026	Florida Vamp Vol.1
"Four Five"	2026	Non-album single

== Tours ==
=== Supporting ===
- Melt My Eyez Tour (Denzel Curry) (2022)
- Greyday Tour (Denzel Curry) (2023)
