= McCartney, It'll Be Ok =

Studio album by University
- Released: June 20, 2025
- Length: 40:43
- Label: Transgressive
- Producer: Kwes Darko; University

University chronology
Title Track (2023)	McCartney, It'll Be Ok (2025)

Singles from McCartney, It'll Be Ok
- 1. "Curwen" Released: 8 April 2025

McCartney, It'll Be Ok is the debut studio album by British punk trio University. It was released on 20 June 2025 via Transgressive in LP, CD and digital formats.

McCartney, It'll Be Ok is preceded by the band's 2023 EP, Title Track. It was produced by Kwes Darko, who recorded it in a studio in London owned by Damon Albarn. The album's first single is "Curwen", which was released on 8 April 2025, alongside a music video directed by Nina Dellow.

== Reception ==
Professional ratings
Review scores
Source	Rating
AllMusic	4/5 stars
Clash	8/10 stars
DIY	4/5 stars
Dork	4/5 stars

The album received a four-star rating from AllMusic, whose reviewer Mark Deming noted, "On their debut album, University make it obvious there's enough precision in the band's reckless attack that this music demands to be taken seriously."

Isabella Ambrosio of DIY, also rating the album four stars, described it as "clashing, cluttered, chaotic, challenging" and "a venture beyond the conventional consideration of 'progressive', one to simultaneously blow eardrums and provoke minds."

Clash's Julia Mason noted the "glorious noise, chaos, mayhem and moments of calm which takes us to another world completely," on the album, stating that the band "have given us themselves on their debut album." The publication gave it a rating of eight out of ten.

Dork rated it four out of five and called it "a debut that proves you can push punk's boundaries without losing its beating heart – or its sense of humour. Seriously impressive stuff."

== Track listing ==
All tracks are written by Ewan Barton, Zak Bowker, and Joel Smith.

McCartney, It'll Be Ok track listing
No.	Title	Length
1.	"Massive Twenty One Pilots Tattoo"	5:01
2.	"Curwen"	4:30
3.	"Gorilla Panic"	6:16
4.	"Hustler's Metamorphosis"	4:31
5.	"GTA Online"	3:48
6.	"Diamond Song"	4:02
7.	"History of Iron Maiden Pt. 1"	9:59
8.	"History of Iron Maiden Pt. 0.5"	2:36
Total length:		40:43

== Personnel ==
Credits adapted from Tidal.

=== University ===
- Ewan Barton – bass guitar, production, photography
- Zak Bowker – vocals, guitar, production, photography
- Joel Smith – drums, production, photography

=== Additional contributors ===
- Kwes Darko – production
- Andrea Cozzaglio – mixing
- Katie Tavini – mastering
- John Fatora – graphic design
- Alex James – photography
- Chiara Michieletto – photography
- Natàlia Pagès Geli – photography

== Charts ==
Chart performance for McCartney, It'll Be Ok
Chart (2025)	Peak position
UK Independent Albums (OCC)	31
