= TiaCorine =

American rapper

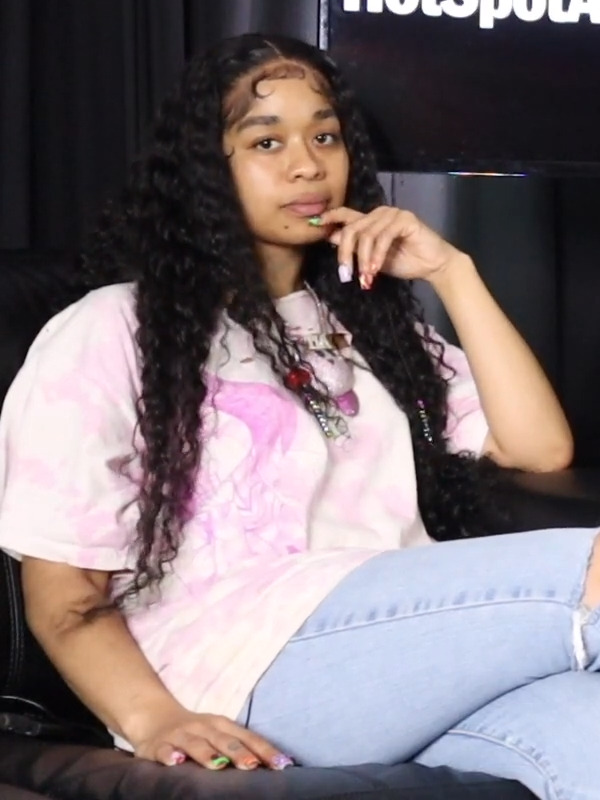
- TiaCorine in 2023

Background information
- Born: Tia Corine Thompson Shults; Winston-Salem, North Carolina, U.S
- Genre: Hip-hop
- Occupations: Rapper; songwriter
- Years active: 2013–present
- Labels: South Coast Music Group; Interscope
- Member of: The Scythe

Tia Corine Thompson Shults, known professionally as TiaCorine, is an American rapper and songwriter from Winston-Salem, North Carolina. She is best known for her singles "Lotto" and "FreakyT".

== Early life and education ==
Tia Shults was born and raised in Winston-Salem, North Carolina to a Shoshone mother and a Japanese-African American father. In the fourth grade, Shults began performing at local talent shows and started taking flute and piano lessons. She attended Winston-Salem State University and graduated with a degree in exercise physiology, originally planning to become a physician assistant. While in college, she worked as a shift manager at Bojangles.

== Career ==
=== 2013–2021: 34Corine ===
Shults began releasing music in 2013. In 2017, she released her first major single, "Cabbage" with OG Spliff. In late 2019, she signed to the record label South Coast Music Group. On September 4, 2020, she released her debut EP, 34Corine. The album featured the song "Lotto", which received significant traction on TikTok. On May 14, 2021, she released a follow-up to 34Corine titled The Saga of 34Corine, featuring guest appearances from Kenny Beats, DaBaby, and Frais006. On November 27, 2021, she released her second EP, Pussy.

=== 2022–2025: I Can't Wait and Corinian ===
On September 9, 2022, she released her debut album, I Can't Wait, featuring guest appearances from UnoTheActivist, Kenny Beats, and Tony Shhnow. The album featured the song "FreakyT", which received significant traction on TikTok. She joined Key Glock on his Glockoma Tour from March to April 2023. On April 21, 2023, she released a remix to "FreakyT" featuring rapper Latto. In June 2023, she featured on the Curtis Waters album Bad Son, on the song "Petty". She was selected as member of the 2023 XXL Freshmen Class.

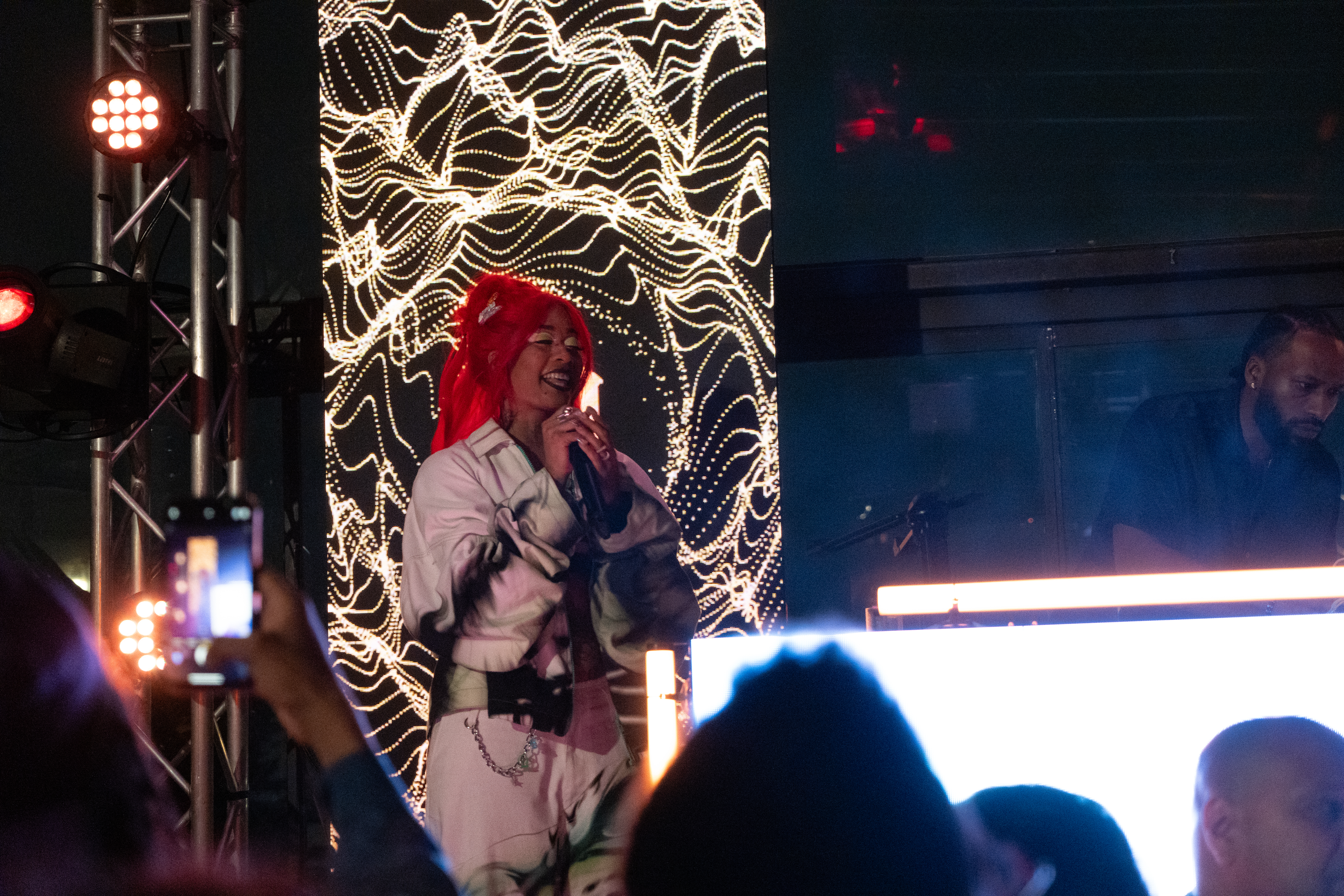
TiaCorine performing in Brooklyn in 2023

On February 2, 2024, she released her fourth EP, Almost There, under South Coast Music Group and Interscope Records with guest appearances from Key Glock, Luh Tyler, and Zelooperz. She performed her first headlining tour, the Almost There Tour, in March 2024. She featured on the Denzel Curry single "Hot One" alongside ASAP Ferg in June 2024. She featured on the TisaKorean album In Silly We Trust in October 2024. In August 2025, she featured on the Chance the Rapper album Star Line, on the song "Gun In Yo Purse" alongside Young Thug, and on the Joey Valence & Brae album Hyperyouth, on the song "Bust Down". She released her second album, Corinian, on October 10, 2025. The album features guest appearances from Saweetie, Flo Milli, Smino, Wiz Khalifa, JID, and Pouya.

=== 2026-present: Strictly 4 the Scythe ===
She featured on the Jordan Ward song "Carsex" from his January 2026 album Backward. The rap group The Scythe, featuring TiaCorine, Denzel Curry, ASAP Ferg, Bktherula, and Key Nyata as members, formed in January 2026. The group's debut album, Strictly 4 the Scythe, released on March 6, 2026. She featured on the June 2026 DJ Shadow single "Nobody Speak Part 2" alongside Run the Jewels and Denzel Curry. She is scheduled to open for Thundercat on his North American Distracted AF Tour in 2026.

== Artistry ==
Shults has stated that the music her parents played to her as a child are a major influence on her, including artists such as Queen, Teena Marie, Sade, Sugarhill Gang, A Tribe Called Quest, Luther Vandross, Aaliyah, Michael Jackson, The Notorious B.I.G., and Ginuwine. She has described her music style as "anime trap."

== Personal life ==
Shults has a daughter, born in 2015 or 2016. She is a fan of anime; her favorite shows include Hunter x Hunter, Inuyasha, Attack on Titan, and Sailor Moon. She is a fan of streetwear fashion, and is known to wear a diamond chain necklace of Kirby.

In September 2023, she underwent vocal cord surgery and was unable to speak for two months.

As of August 2025, Shults lives in Winston-Salem, North Carolina.

== Discography ==
=== Studio albums ===
| Title | Album details | Peak chart positions | |
| Title | Album details | AUS | SCO |
|---|---|---|---|
| I Can't Wait | Released: September 9, 2022; Label: South Coast Music Group; Format: Digital download, streaming | — | — |
| Corinian | Released: October 10, 2025; Label: South Coast Music Group, Interscope; Format: Digital download, streaming | — | — |
| Strictly 4 the Scythe (with The Scythe) | Released: March 6, 2026; Label: PH, Loma Vista; Format: Digital download, streaming | 91 | 74 |

=== Extended plays ===
| Title | EP details |
|---|---|
| 34Corine | Released: September 4, 2020; Label: South Coast Music Group; Format: Digital download, streaming |
| The Saga of 34Corine | Released: May 14, 2021; Label: South Coast Music Group; Format: Digital download, streaming |
| Pussy | Released: November 27, 2021; Label: Self-released; Format: Digital download, streaming |
| Almost There | Released: February 2, 2024; Label: South Coast Music Group, Interscope; Format: Digital download, streaming |

=== Certified singles ===
| Title | Year | Certifications | Album |
|---|---|---|---|
| "FreakyT" | 2022 | RIAA: Gold | I Can't Wait |
