= Mudrat =

- Also known as: Kvnyl (Note: Pronounced /kʌvˈaɪnəl/ kuh-VY-nuhl)
- Origin: Melbourne, Australia
- Genres: Punk rock; hip hop; punk rap; nu-metal
- Occupations: Rapper; singer; songwriter
- Instrument: Vocals
- Years active: 2017–present
- Website: www.mudrat.net

Sean Thompson, known professionally as Mudrat and formerly Kvnyl, is an Australian rapper, singer and songwriter. He began his career as Kvnyl, releasing several singles in 2020 and his first extended play (EP), The Worst of Me, in 2021. By October 2023, he started using the moniker Mudrat and performing with The Mischief, a four-piece (now three-piece) band that supports him during live performances and on studio recordings.

A vocal critic of the Israeli government's actions in the Gaza war and coinciding genocide, he has organised and performed at several pro-Palestinian protests and charity events. In 2025, he self-released his debut album, Social Cohesion.

== Career ==
=== Early career as Kvnyl (2018–2023) ===
Thompson developed an "eclectic" taste in music in early childhood, which he attributes to his father "instill[ing] the importance of music" by introducing him to artists such as Britney Spears, Cold Chisel, Bob Marley, and the Red Hot Chili Peppers in addition to rappers like Eminem, Jay-Z, and Dr. Dre. He wrote poetry in his mid-teens and won multiple school public speaking competitions. While attending university in his early twenties, he felt aimless and experienced a "big depressive episode", which led him to begin producing hip hop music by 2017 to have "something to work towards". The following year, he released All the World's a Stage, a series of eight songs that combined elements of the monologue of the same name from William Shakespeare's As You Like It with beats from an unreleased tape by Kanye West. In 2020, he released the songs "This Is Not a Single" and "Running", the latter featuring Agnus and Sir Jude. In February 2021, he released his debut extended play, The Worst of Me, alongside a short film of the same name.

The final Kvnyl track, "2Nas", was released on 21 September 2023. He premiered the song during a performance at the Gasometer Hotel in Collingwood, Victoria, where he was first accompanied by a backing band.

=== Mudrat and Social Cohesion (2023–present) ===
Following the release of The Worst of Me, Mudrat struggled to write songs and find his "true kind of authentic creative self" through mid-2023. He began using the name Mudrat to "acknowledge that process", also citing that Kvnyl was "hard to enunciate on first looking at it". In October 2023, Mudrat wrote what would become Mudrat's debut song, "Mud", and again performed live with a band. Referred to as The Mischief, the group consists of guitarist Javier Langham, drummer Emile Battour, and bass guitarist Noah Dixon-Sole. The following month, he posted a clip of the song to TikTok that included "vicious" lyrics criticising the Australian Government for its response to the ongoing Israeli–Palestinian conflict, which resulted in media attention. "Mud" was officially released as a single in December 2023, featuring vocals from Battour.

Mudrat released two singles in 2024; "I Hate Rich Cunts" in April and "Year of the Rat" in December. He and the Mischief supported Australian band Chasing Ghosts on their three-date Amnesia Everybody Tour in October 2024. On 24 January 2025, he signed with Select Music Booking Agency. In February, he was listed as one of NME's 100 Essential Emerging Artists for 2025 and was selected as one of four winners of Triple J Unearthed's community competition to open for Denzel Curry; he performed with Curry on 2 March at the Palace Foreshore in Melbourne. Three days after that performance, he released "Last Night" with a statement that it was the first track from his debut project Social Cohesion which would be releasing "later [that] year". The next month, "You Don't Care About Poor People" was released, In July, Mudrat announced that Social Cohesion would release in August 2025 and shared another single, "FME" featuring fellow Australian rapper BVT.

The four singles were released shortly after being mastered, which required Mudrat and the Mischief to "get half the album done in the timeframe where [they'd] normally finish one song". Ultimately, Social Cohesion was completed less than a month before its release on 29 August 2025. To support the album, Mudrat embarked on a four-show Australian tour from 6–20 September. In October, Social Cohesion was shortlisted for the Australian Music Prize, which was ultimately awarded to Ninajirachi's album I Love My Computer. On 4 December, he performed with Fever 333 in Melbourne for their sideshow ahead of the Good Things festival.

== Political views ==
Mudrat's music prominently features political themes, which he attributes to having "always been political" and his desire to "use [his] music to speak to the truth".

He is vocally critical of the Gaza war and genocide. He has collaborated with fellow Australian musician Yara to organise events for the pro-Palestinian group Naarm in Solidarity, including a non-profit event in June 2024 to provide mutual aid for a Palestinian family trying to flee Gaza following the Rafah offensive.

On 26 September 2025, Mudrat performed an original song on the Triple J web series Bars of Steel wearing a Palestinian keffiyeh. The lyrics condemned the Gaza genocide with chants saying "Israel is committing genocide" and "free Palestine". He also strongly criticised the Australian Broadcasting Corporation (ABC), Triple J's owner, for "trying out both sides" in its news coverage and for the firing of journalist Antoinette Lattouf in 2023; Lattouf said she was "blown away" by the performance. The next week, Mudrat performed at The Night of Humanity of Palestine, a charity event hosted at the Enmore Theatre that raised over A$100,000 for causes that provide aid to Palestinians in the Gaza Strip, including the Palestine Children's Relief Fund and Médecins Sans Frontières. On 3 November, he performed at a Free Palestine Melbourne protest against real estate firm the Marriner Group for hosting Israeli band Infected Mushroom, whom the event's organisers allege to be a "genocide-enabling" band, at the company's Forum Theatre.

Mudrat has also been critical of the Australian Government's domestic policy. Social Cohesion's title references a series of laws proposed by the Victorian Labor Party following the firebombing of the Adass Israel Synagogue of Melbourne in December 2024. The laws were intended to require multicultural organisations to agree to a "social cohesion pledge" before receiving government grants, ban the display of iconography for "listed terrorist organisations" at protests, and restrict or outlaw protests near religious areas.

== Musical style ==
Mudrat's music has primarily been described as a mix between punk rock and hip-hop (or punk rap) (Note: Attributed to multiple references:) that also incorporates elements of nu-metal, (Note: Attributed to multiple references:) electronic, and anarcho-punk. His sound has been compared to Kneecap, Bob Vylan, Public Enemy, Idles, Genesis Owusu, Cypress Hill, The Prodigy, and Rage Against the Machine. He has cited Kendrick Lamar (specifically his 2015 album To Pimp a Butterfly) as his biggest musical inspiration.

== The Mischief band members ==
- Emile Battour – drums, vocals (2023–present)
- Javier Langham – guitar (2023–present)
- Noah Sole – bass guitar (2023–2026)
- Carlo Darbisi – guitar (c. 2024–2025)

== Discography ==
=== Studio album ===
- Social Cohesion (2025)

=== Extended play ===
- The Worst of Me (2021, as Kvnyl)

=== Singles ===
List of singles by Mudrat
Year	Title	Album
2020	"Running" (as Kvnyl) (featuring Agnus and Sir Jude)	The Worst of Me
2020	"This Is Not a Single" (as Kvnyl)	Non-album single
2023	"2Nas" (as Kvnyl)	Non-album single
2023	"Mud"	Non-album single
2024	"I Hate Rich Cunts"	Social Cohesion
2024	"YEAR OF THE RAT"	Social Cohesion
2025	"Last Night"	Social Cohesion
2025	"You Don't Care About Poor People"	Social Cohesion
2025	"FME" (featuring BVT)	Social Cohesion
