= Dive In! =

"Dive In"

Single by Jeleel

from the album Real Raw
- Released: May 21, 2021
- Genre: Rage; trap
- Length: 1:40
- Label: 10K Projects
- Producer: Connie

Jeleel singles chronology
"Attention" (2021)	"Dive In" (2021)	"Jeleel Juice" (2021)

"Dive In" is a song by the American rapper and singer Jeleel. It was released on May 21, 2021, through 10K Projects as the lead single from his debut studio album Real Raw (2023). A music video directed by Well Known Studios and Quinn Donovan premiered alongside the song's release and depicts dancing in an abandoned mall.

== Background and composition ==
Following the release of the song, "Dive In" had gained traction on social media platforms such as TikTok. The song would garner over 50 million streams on Spotify, leading to Jeleel later signing a partnership deal with the record label 10K Projects. In a 2023 interview by Paper, Jeleel would state: "[...] I started putting “Dive In!” in the background of my videos. People didn't even know I sang the song. And then once they found out and connected the dots, they started posting it everywhere and I was out. I blew up on TikTok and “Dive In” was the soundtrack to JELEEL!".

== Critical reception ==
Paper's Josh Svetz described the song as "impossibly catchy" and "manic-energy inducing". While Brandon Callender of The Fader called it a "ragey anthem" that can "burn down the house".
