= No Hands (album) =

Studio album by Joey Valence & Brae
- Released: June 7, 2024
- Recorded: October 2023 – March 2024
- Genres: Hip hop; drum and bass; punk rap
- Length: 31:25
- Label: Self-released
- Producers: Joey Valence; Patrick Nissley; Lucas Banker

Joey Valence & Brae chronology
Punk Tactics (2023)	No Hands (2024)	Hyperyouth (2025)

Deluxe edition cover

Singles from No Hands
- 1. ""The Baddest"" Released: April 26, 2024; 2. ""Packapunch"" Released: June 3, 2024

Professional ratings
Review scores
Source	Rating
RapReviews	8/10 stars

No Hands (stylized in all caps) is the second studio album by American rap duo Joey Valence & Brae. It was self-released on June 7, 2024. The album was primarily produced by Joey Valence, with the exception of two tracks. It features guest appearances from Danny Brown, Z-Trip, and Terror Reid. The album received critical acclaim upon release.

On September 13, 2024, a deluxe edition of the album was released. This version features three new songs, a cover of Charli XCX's "365", and a remix of "The Baddest" featuring Ayesha Erotica.

== Background ==
On August 24, 2024, a breakdown of the album's production was livestreamed on the Joey Valence & Brae YouTube channel.

== Critical reception ==
No Hands received critical acclaim upon release. Grant Jones of RapReviews praised the project's production, noting that "for a self-produced record from two youngsters, No Hands is remarkably refined. It possesses a healthy variety you’d also get from the Beasties." Jones further identified "Packapunch" as a standout single.

== Track listing ==
All tracks are produced by Joey Valence. All tracks are written by Joey Valence and Braedan Lugue, except where noted.

No Hands track listing
No.	Title	Writer(s)	Length
1.	"Bussit"		2:35
2.	"Packapunch" (featuring Danny Brown)	Valence; Lugue; Danny Brown	3:00
3.	"No Hands" (featuring Z-Trip)		2:47
4.	"Like a Punk"		2:24
5.	"Where U From"		2:46
6.	"Intermission 2"		1:49
7.	"The Baddest"	Valence; Lugue; Lucas Banker; Patrick Nissley	2:23
8.	"Ok"	Valence; Lugue; Banker	2:23
9.	"Doughboy" (featuring Terror Reid)	Valence; Banker; Nissley	2:53
10.	"What U Need"		2:18
11.	"John Cena"		2:43
12.	"Omnitrix"		3:18
Total length:			31:25

Deluxe edition track listing
No.	Title	Writer(s)	Length
13.	"The Baddest (Badder)" (featuring Ayesha Erotica)	Valence; Lugue; Ayesha Erotica; Banker; Nissley	2:23
14.	"Pineapple Fried Rice"		3:16
15.	"Can't Stop Now"		2:50
16.	"Freaks"		2:32
17.	"365"	Charlotte Aitchison; Alexander Guy Cook; Henry Walter	2:34
Total length:			45:03

== Charts ==
Chart performance for No Hands
Chart (2024)	Peak position
UK Independent Albums Breakers (OCC)	8
UK R&B Albums (Official Charts)	18
UK Record Store (OCC)	14
