= Hyperyouth =

Studio album by Joey Valence & Brae
- Released: August 15, 2025
- Length: 43:57
- Label: RCA
- Producer: Joey Valence

Joey Valence & Brae chronology
No Hands (2024)	Hyperyouth (2025)

Alternative cover
- Hyperyouth (Afterparty)

Singles from Hyperyouth
- 1. "Wassup" Released: June 13, 2025; 2. ""Hyperyouth" / "Live Right"" Released: July 11, 2025; 3. ""See U Dance"" Released: August 11, 2025

Professional ratings
Review scores
Source	Rating
Dork	4/5 stars
Kerrang!	4/5 stars

Hyperyouth (stylized in all caps) is the third studio album by American rap duo Joey Valence & Brae. It was released on August 15, 2025, through RCA Records, marking the duo's major label debut. The album features guest appearances from TiaCorine, Rebecca Black, and JPEGMafia. Hyperyouth follows the duo's 2024 album No Hands and was supported by three singles: "Wassup", "Hyperyouth" / "Live Right", and "See U Dance".

== Background and recording ==
Hyperyouth follows Joey Valence & Brae's second studio album, No Hands, which was released in 2024. Their previous projects were self-released, but Hyperyouth was released under RCA.

== Production and composition ==
Joey Valence & Brae chose the songs "Hyperyouth" and "Live Right" to announce the album as they felt they represented the tone and themes of the album from different perspectives. They described "Hyperyouth" as a high-energy, sample-heavy track that celebrates artists who inspired the duo, while "Live Right" is more anthemic and deals with growing up.

The duo have described it as an album about growing up. Joey Valence listed Nurture by Porter Robinson, Shock Value by Timbaland, The E.N.D. by the Black Eyed Peas, Brat by Charli XCX, Discovery by Daft Punk, Oracular Spectacular by MGMT, Graduation and My Beautiful Dark Twisted Fantasy by Kanye West, and Igor by Tyler, the Creator as influences on the album.

== Release and promotion ==
On June 6, 2025, during JPEGMafia's performance at the Governors Ball Music Festival, Joey Valence & Brae were brought on stage and performed their then-unreleased song, "Wassup". It was later released as the lead single for the album on June 13, 2025. On July 11, they formally announced the album, releasing the double single "Hyperyouth" / "Live Right". They also revealed a world tour set to run from September to November. On August 11, the duo released the single "See U Dance" featuring Rebecca Black. A deluxe edition of the album, titled Hyperyouth (Afterparty), was released on February 27, 2026.

== Track listing ==
All music is composed by Joey Valence. All tracks are written by Joseph Bertolino and Braedan Lugue, with additional writers noted. Track listing adapted from Apple Music.

Hyperyouth track listing
No.	Title	Writer(s)	Length
1.	"Hyperyouth"	Sonny Moore; Tom Rowlands; Ed Simmons; Jesse Weaver	2:47
2.	"Bust Down" (featuring TiaCorine)	Tia Thompson-Shults	2:45
3.	"Give It to Me"		2:25
4.	"Is This Love"		3:00
5.	"See U Dance" (featuring Rebecca Black)	Black; Jesse Saint John; Lucas Banker; Patrick Nissley	2:46
6.	"Party's Over"		3:40
7.	"Wassup" (featuring JPEGMafia)	Barrington Hendricks; Gerald McCary; Ira Brown; Carlos Young; James Brown; Stephen Gibson; Cecil Glenn	3:00
8.	"Live Right"	André Benjamin; Antwan Patton; David Sheats	3:39
9.	"Billie Jean"	James Calhoun	2:48
10.	"Have to Cry"		2:58
11.	"The Party Song"	Alain Mion; J. Brown	3:09
12.	"Myself"		3:17
13.	"Go Hard"	Afrika Bambaataa; Arthur Baker; Ellis Williams; Emil Schult; John Graham Hill; John Miller; John Robie; Naeem Hanks; Ralf Hütter; Robert Allen; Santi White	2:46
14.	"Disco Tomorrow"	Bennett Blumberg	4:57
Total length:			43:57

Hyperyouth (Afterparty) track listing
No.	Title	Writer(s)	Length
1.	"Friends"		2:46
2.	"Push The Pipe"		3:08
3.	"How Does It Feel To Be Young"		1:36
4.	"Bustamove"		2:18
5.	"I Like This"		3:11
6.	"Changes"	Porter Robinson; Amy Millan	3:30
Total length:			60:26

Notes

- The standard tracks are stylized in all caps, while the Afterparty tracks are stylized in all lowercase.
- On the Afterparty Deluxe version, the standard version follows as tracks 7–20.

Sample credits

- "Hyperyouth" contains a sample from "Bangarang", written by Sonny Moore, as performed by Skrillex; "Block Rockin' Beats", written by Tom Rowlands, Ed Simmons, and Jesse Weaver, as performed by the Chemical Brothers; and "Like a Punk", written by Joseph Bertolino and Braedan Lugue, as performed by Joey Valence & Brae.
- "Wassup" contains a sample from "Whatz Up, Whatz Up", written by Gerald McCary, Ira Brown, and Carlos Young, as performed by Playa Poncho and L.A. Sno; "Think (About It)", written by James Brown, as performed by Lyn Collins; and "Whoomp! (There It Is)", written by Stephen Gibson and Cecil Glenn, as performed by Tag Team.
- "Live Right" interpolates "Ms. Jackson", written by André Benjamin, Antwan Patton, and David Sheats, as performed by Outkast.
- "Changes" contains a sample from "Divinity", written by Porter Robinson, as performed by Porter Robinson and Amy Millan.

== Charts ==
Chart performance for Hyperyouth
Chart (2025)	Peak position
Australian Vinyl Albums (ARIA)	19
