= Jeleel =

American rapper (born 1995)

- Born: Abdul Jeleel Yussuf; October 14, 1995 (age 31); Providence, Rhode Island, U.S
- Genres: Hip hop; trap; rage; hyperpop; R&B
- Occupations: Rapper; singer; songwriter; Record producer
- Years active: 2018–present
- Labels: 10K; Warner

Abdul Jeleel Yussuf (born October 14, 1995), known professionally as Jeleel (stylized as JELEEL!), is an American rapper, singer, and record producer from Providence, Rhode Island. He is known for his single "Dive In!" which received traction on social media.

== Early life and education ==
Jeleel was born on October 14, 1995, in Providence, Rhode Island and raised in Pawtucket, Rhode Island. He is of Nigerian descent and is Muslim. He attended La Salle Academy in Providence and graduated from Loyola University Maryland.

== Career ==
=== 2018–2020: Beginnings ===
Jeleel released his first song, Play Me, while attending university, though it has since been deleted from all platforms. Jeleel released the project Angel From Heaven in 2019. In 2020, he released the extended play Generation Z. In 2021, Jeleel released the song "Dive In!", which received traction on TikTok and other social media sites, and garnered over 50 million streams on Spotify, and resulted in him signing a partnership with the record label 10K Projects.

=== 2021–2023: Debut studio album, "Hands Up!" and "Wahala!" ===
In April 2022, Jeleel released a single titled "Rain On You!". In June 2022, he released a collaboration with rapper Mike Dimes titled Clubhouse!. In July 2022, he released a single titled "Uncivilized! (Go!)". In August 2022, he released a single titled "Stone Cold!". In September 2022, he performed at the Made in America Festival. Also in September 2022, he released a single titled "Deliver!". In January 2023, Jeleel released a single titled “Ride The Wave!” and shot the music video in Nigeria. He released his debut studio album, Real Raw!, on May 5, 2023. On July 4, 2023, he released "Hands Up!" for Independence Day, sampling Miley Cyrus' 2009 hit "Party in the USA".

=== 2024–present: Xistence and Nyash Worldwide! ===
On November 18, 2024, Jeleel released Xistence, his second studio album. The album was his first independent release. On May 2, 2025, Jeleel released the single "Rhude Gyal." On June 6, 2025, Jeleel released Nyash Worldwide!, another independent release. In August 2025, he released a remix of "Rhude Gyal" with Nigerian-British rapper Darkoo.

== Musical style ==
XXL's Kemet High described Jeleel's sound as "rap, punk and R&B". Alexander Cole of HotNewHipHop describes Jeleel's style as "an energetic vocal delivery, some loud rock-inspired production, and a catchy hook that will be in your head all day".

Jeleel has listed his biggest influences in music as DMX, Paramore, 50 Cent, Sum 41, Limp Bizkit and Blink-182. He also says Fuji music informs his style in music.

== Personal life ==
Jeleel's signature "Jeleel, yeah!" comes from his childhood, when his mother would call his name and he would respond by shouting "yeah!" Jeleel grew up Muslim and believes that melodic readings of the Quran helped him find spirituality in music.

== Discography ==
=== Studio albums ===
Title	Album details
Real Raw!	Released: May 5, 2023; Label: 10K Projects; Format: Digital download, streaming
Xistence	Released: November 18, 2024; Label: REAL RAW!; Format: Digital download, streaming
Nyash Worldwide!	Released: June 6, 2025; Label: REAL RAW!; Format: Digital download, streaming

=== Mixtapes ===
Title	Mixtape details
Angel From Heaven	Released: June 7, 2019; Label: Self-released; Format: Digital download, streaming

=== Extended plays ===
Title	EP details
Generation Z	Released: June 3, 2020; Label: Self-released; Format: Digital download, streaming

=== Singles ===
Title	Year	Album
"Glo Up"	2018	Non-album singles
"Charged Up!"	2018	Non-album singles
"Go In!"	2018	Non-album singles
"Mob Out"	2018	Non-album singles
"Top Spot"	2018	Non-album singles
"Wartime!"	2018	Non-album singles
"Yah 3x"	2018	Non-album singles
"Monster!"	2018	Non-album singles
"OkayOkay!"	2018	Non-album singles
"Crazy!"	2018	Non-album singles
"BackBreaker!"	2018	Non-album singles
"Hasta La Vida!"	2019	Angel From Heaven
"Woah!"	2019	Angel From Heaven
"Sweetspot!"	2019	Non-album singles
"Breakurspine!"	2019	Non-album singles
"Superhero!"	2019	Angel From Heaven
"Bubbletea!"	2019	Non-album singles
"Damn!"	2020	Non-album singles
"Intergalactic!"	2020	Non-album singles
"Relapse (From Red Bull's the Cut: LA)" (featuring Charlie Shuffler)	2020	Non-album singles
"Midnight!"	2020	Non-album singles
"Mercy"	2020	Non-album singles
"Someone!"	2020	Non-album singles
"Attention!"	2021	Non-album singles
"Dive In!"	2021	Real Raw!
"Jeleel Juice!"	2021	Non-album singles
"Showtime!"	2021	Non-album singles
"July!"	2022	Non-album singles
"Rain on You!"	2022	Non-album singles
"Clubhouse! (featuring Mike Dimes) / Uncivilized! (Go!)"	2022	Non-album singles
"Stone Cold!"	2022	Non-album singles
"Deliver!"	2022	Non-album singles
"Shots!" (featuring Denzel Curry)	2022	Real Raw!
"Ride The Wave!"	2023	Real Raw!
"Gnarly!" (with Armani White)	2023	Non-album singles
"Wicked!"	2023	Real Raw!
"Hands Up!"	2023	Non-album singles
"Wahala!"	2023	Non-album singles
"GFU!"	2023	Non-album singles
"I Look Good!"	2024	Non-album singles
"See Me Now!"	2024	Non-album singles
"Rhude Gyal"	2025	Nyash Worldwide!
"Rave!" (with Adam Vadel)	2025	Non-album singles
"Rhude Gyal!" (Remix) (featuring Darkoo)	2025	Non-album singles
"Call Me!"	2025	Non-album singles
"Normal Normal!"	2026	Non-album singles
