= Keepin It Cloudy =

- Standard cover art for the album

Studio album by Lazer Dim 700
- Released: December 18, 2024
- Recorded: 2024
- Genres: Hip-hop; trap; plugg
- Label: Self-released
- Producers: 360 Hundred; Ark; Blaccy; BRYJK; DawgTwist; Dmnchxld00; Dowin; Fuegito; GoXan; KVZ; LazerMade; Litfroy; Mahxltxl; Mxgc; Shxystu; Skellocam; Snow!; XOU; XpWave; Zilla

Lazer Dim 700 chronology
| Injoy (2024) | Keepin It Cloudy (2024) | Sins Aloud (2025) |

Singles from Keepin It Cloudy
- 1. "Luigi" Released: November 26, 2024; 2. "Calypso" Released: December 4, 2024; 3. "WTM" Released: December 11, 2024

Keepin It Cloudy (stylized in all caps) is the debut studio album by American rapper Lazer Dim 700, released independently on December 18, 2024. It serves as the follow-up to his commercial mixtape Injoy, released nine months prior. It does not feature any guest appearances, and was supported by three singles: "Luigi", "Calypso", and "WTM".

== Background and promotion ==
On March 13, 2024, Lazer released his debut commercial mixtape, titled Injoy. After his debut commercial album release, the album was initially planned to coincide with Lazer's first-ever tour, announced in late June 2024, with dates shared on July 2. However, the tour was canceled due to personal issues, and during this period, Lazer's social media accounts fell victim to a series of cyberattacks. On September 26, 2024, Lazer provided updates on the album's progress and reannounced his tour. In October, he collaborated with artists such as Benji Blue Bills, Denzel Curry, and Ola Runt, building hype for the album's release.

Promotion for the album included the release of the double single "Luigi" on November 26, 2024, accompanied by music videos, followed by the third single, "Calypso", on December 4. On the same day, Lazer revealed the album's title and announced its pre-save availability.

== Critical reception ==
Professional ratings
Review scores
| Source | Rating |
|---|---|
| Pitchfork | 5.9/10 |

=== Overview ===
Pitchfork was mixed, praising Lazer Dim 700's surreal humor, inventive wordplay, and chaotic energy, but lamenting the loss of the raw, janky thrill of his earlier work. The writer felt that tracks like "0436" and "WTM" shine with quotables and his signature "extremes-of-consciousness" flow, but the album's cleaner production and repetitive beats dull its impact, making it feel "so regular". Additionally, another writer from Pitchfork wrote how the album is a low-fi and low-slung project which blends Lazer's "conversational, gag-filled flow" with his BandLab beats, the writer wrote how the beats sound like "collaged snippets of phone calls picked up by a Cold War–era bug."

=== Songs ===
According to Jordan Rose of Complex, he wrote how "Luigi" sounds like what someone would "listen to while taking an acid trip in a ‘90s-themed mall arcade". Leo Galil of Chicago Reader wrote how "Fast & Furious" "sounds like a drill track run through an Atari 2600."

== Track listing ==
Keepin It Cloudy track listing
| No. | Title | Writer(s) | Producer(s) | Length |
|---|---|---|---|---|
| 1. | "Keepin It Cloudy" | D'evokeyous Hamilton; Eriq Dixon | Dmnchxld00 | 2:06 |
| 2. | "Default Whip" | Hamilton; Konstantinos Papanikitas | Fuegito | 2:02 |
| 3. | "Calypso" | Hamilton; Juinor Erisca | Zilla | 1:38 |
| 4. | "Militant" | Hamilton; Elijah Armour; Michael Lorenzo Moten | GoXan; Skellocam | 2:08 |
| 5. | "0436" | Hamilton; Al Zidane Riditya Ismayadi | Snow! | 2:15 |
| 6. | "Medicaid" | Hamilton; Egor Scherbyna | Litfroy | 1:40 |
| 7. | "Fast & Furious" | Hamilton; Ethan Wilson; Noah Murray-Brezynskie | Ark; Mahxltxl | 2:24 |
| 8. | "Luigi" | Hamilton; Arjun Manu Kurup | KVZ | 1:37 |
| 9. | "Foreign (928)" | Hamilton; Omar Nazih Farhan | 360 Hundred | 1:42 |
| 10. | "On Gang" | Hamilton; Dillian Toole | Dowin | 2:02 |
| 11. | "WTM" | Hamilton; Lazar Andrić | LazerMade | 2:21 |
| 12. | "Whip It" | Hamilton; Elijah Armour | GoXan | 1:50 |
| 13. | "Greened Out" | Hamilton; Rinaz Khafisov | Shxystu | 2:14 |
| 14. | "Meteor" | Hamilton; Papanikitas; Thaden Benavidez | DawgTwist; Fuegito | 2:19 |
| 15. | "Loveless" | Hamilton | Blaccy | 2:18 |
| 16. | "Swxchnup" | Hamilton; Jaylon Jones; Papanikitas; Tavon Williams | Fuegito; XOU; Mxgc | 2:10 |
| 17. | "Hitone" | Hamilton; Brysin King; Scherbyna | BRYJK; Litfroy | 1:40 |
| 18. | "Rewind" | Hamilton | XpWave | 2:03 |
| Total length: | | | | 36:29 |

Notes

- All tracks are stylized in all caps.
