= Lazer Dim 700 =

American rapper (born 2002)

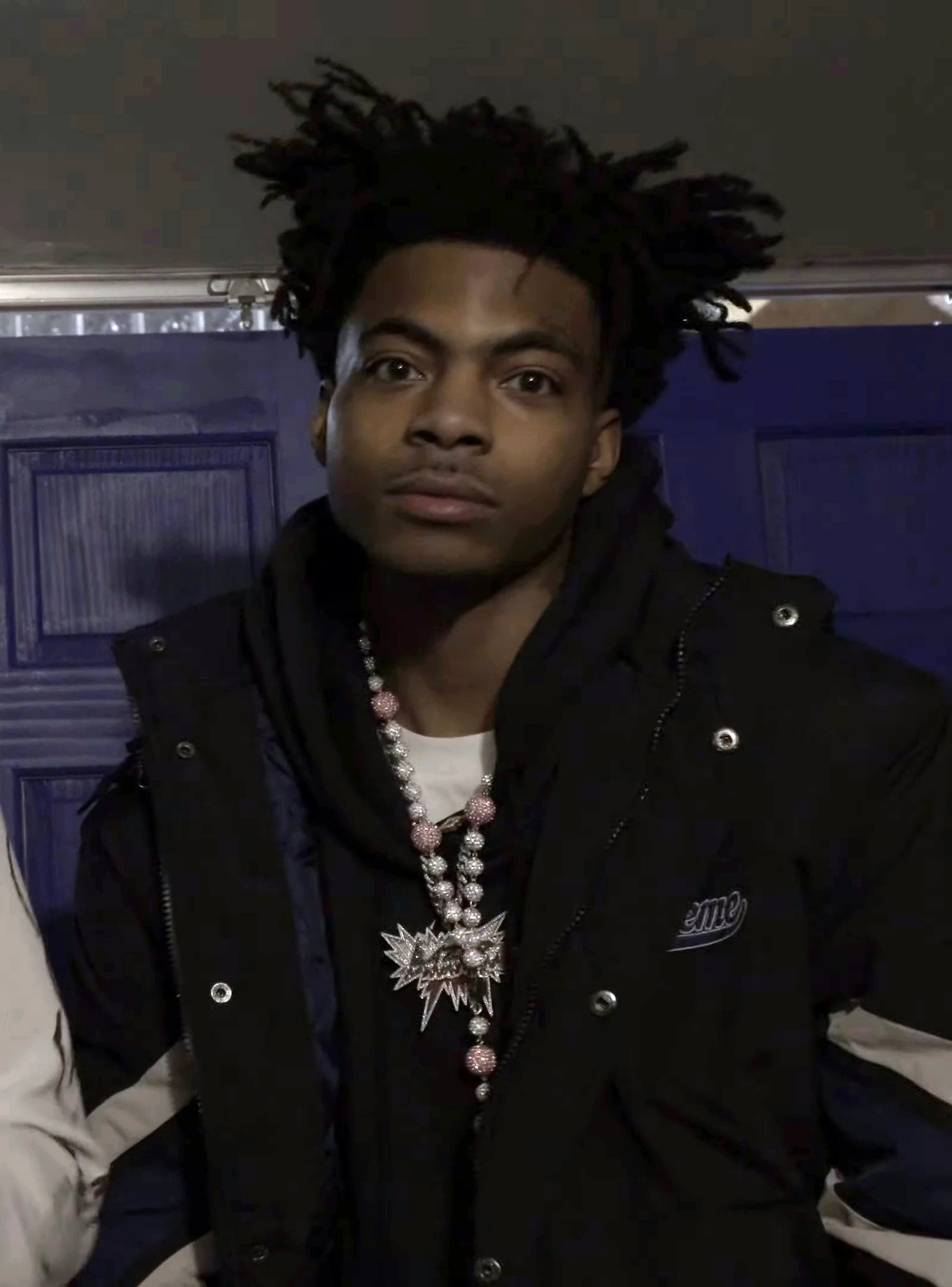
- Lazer Dim 700 in 2025

Background information
- Born: Devokeyous Keyshawn Hamilton; March 8, 2002 (age 24); Atlanta, Georgia, U.S.
- Origin: Cordele, Georgia, U.S.
- Genres: Trap; plugg
- Occupations: Rapper; singer; songwriter
- Instrument: Vocals
- Years active: 2013–present
- Website: https://lazerdim700.com/

Devokeyous Keyshawn Hamilton (born March 8, 2002), known professionally as Lazer Dim 700 (stylized in all caps), is an American rapper, singer, and songwriter from Cordele, Georgia. He is known for his off-the-dome style of rapping and his beats which often feature chaotic 808s. He has been described by Complex as "Young Nudy crossed with Playboi Carti" and "Atlanta's most chaotic and fun new rapper." His debut studio album, Keepin It Cloudy, was released on December 18, 2024. His second studio album, Sins Aloud, was released on July 1, 2025.

== Early life ==
Hamilton grew up in Cordele, Georgia. He began rapping in second grade, inspired by his mother’s boyfriend, who set up a makeshift studio in their house to record rap, and the Atlanta rap he heard on the radio.

== Career ==
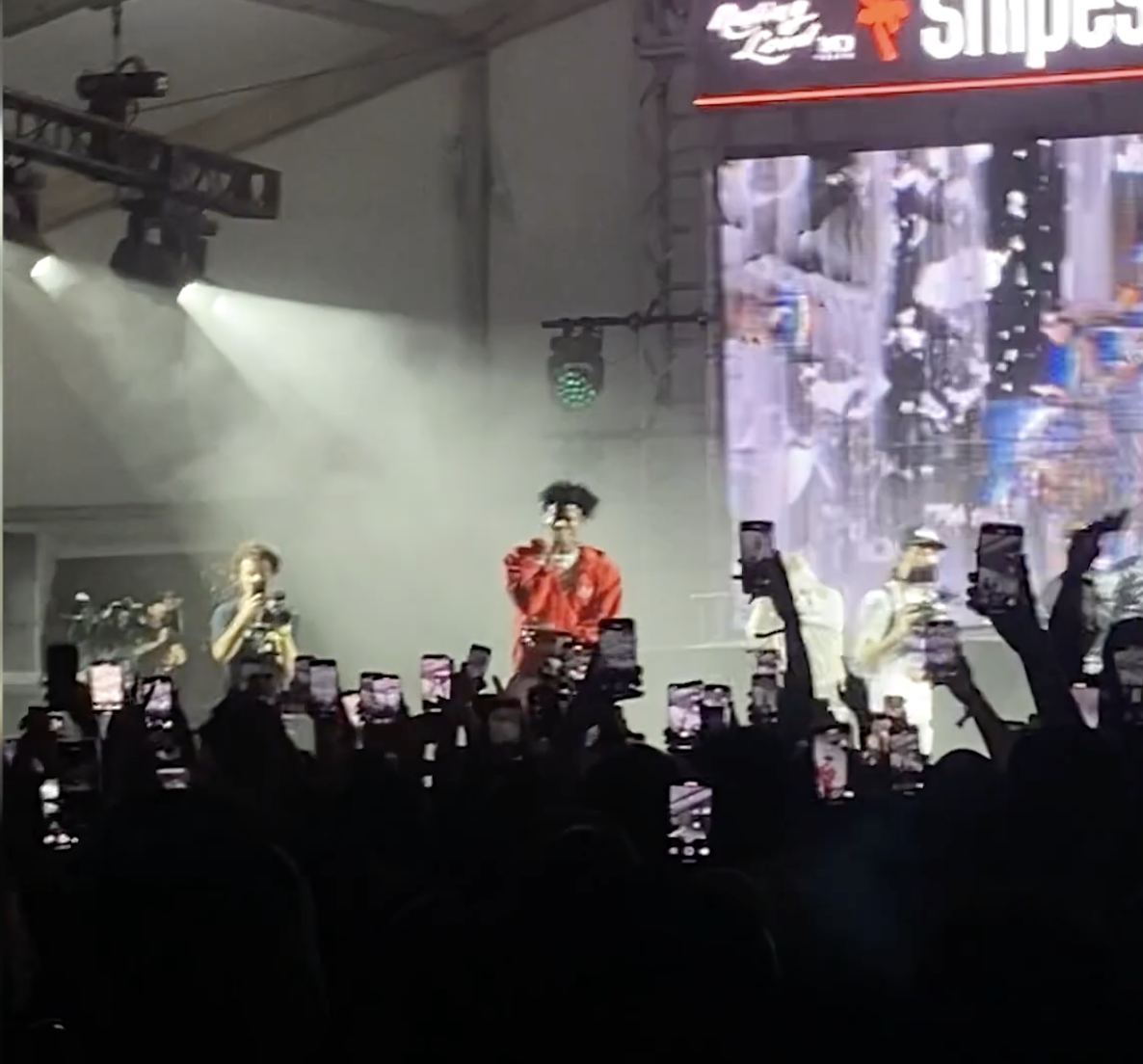
Lazer Dim 700 performing at Rolling Loud in 2024

Hamilton performed at Summer Smash, a music festival hosted by Lyrical Lemonade, on June 14, 2024. The TikTok personality "Diddy Bop" was seen on stage with the rapper. He also performed the following year at Summer Smash 2025. One of Lazer's big moments in his career was when he first appeared on PlaqueBoyMax's stream. PBM was making a studio session video featuring Lazer, they smoked a joint rolled by Lazer before starting the session, which Lazer Dim 700 famously laced. They then recorded the song "Laced Max" in the same session, which went to become one of his biggest songs and blew up along with the clips of Max being laced by Lazer. This helped to propel Lazer out of the deep underground and more into the mainstream.

== Musical style ==
Hamilton creates most of his music using the BandLab app.

Hamilton does not plan out most of his lyrics. His delivery often has no "hook, bridge, or break for air, just a perpetual stream-of-consciousness", according to Complex.

Hamilton constantly makes new music with a focus on choosing "weirdo" beats, like his song "Injoyable" which samples SpongeBob's laugh. The bass of his songs has been described by The Fader as "being tailormade to wound subwoofers." Alphonse Pierre, a writer for Pitchfork, said of the instrumentals he raps over as "draw[ing] their influence from the maximalism of Lex Luger and Young Chop and the vibey original wave of plugg," with boosted bass similar to Brazilian funk.

== Discography ==
=== Albums ===
Title	Details
Keepin It Cloudy	Released: December 18, 2024; Label: Self-released; Formats: Streaming
Sins Aloud	Released: July 1, 2025; Label: Self-released; Formats: Streaming
GANGWAY	Released: September 19, 2025; Label: Self-released; Formats: Streaming
The Rule of Success	Released: June 4, 2026; Label: Self-released; Formats: Streaming

=== Mixtapes ===
Title	Details
4zzz Up	Released: October 31, 2019; Label: Self-released; Formats: Streaming
Blam 4 Fun	Released: September 18, 2020; Label: Self-released; Format: Streaming
The World Is Yours	Released: October 31, 2022; Label: Self-released; Format: Streaming
Hot Streak	Released: February 3, 2023; Label: Self-released; Format: Streaming
8890	Released: March 11, 2023; Label: Self-released; Format: Streaming
Disaster	Released: April 21, 2023; Label: Self-released; Format: Streaming
Injoy	Released: March 13, 2024; Label: Self-released; Format: Streaming

=== Singles ===
Title	Year	Album(s)
"Spark Plug"	2021	Non-album singles
"Outside"	2021	Non-album singles
"Demonic"	2021	Non-album singles
"Easy Kill"	2022	Non-album singles
"Livan Ruff"	2022	Non-album singles
"Blasted"	2022	Non-album singles
"Raw"	2022	Non-album singles
"Luh Lazer"	2022	Non-album singles
"Fat Clip"	2022	Non-album singles
"Fast"	2022	Non-album singles
"Sin"	2022	Non-album singles
"Surgery"	2022	Non-album singles
"Crook"	2023	Non-album singles
"MW3"	2023	Non-album singles
"Targets"	2023	Non-album singles
"Terror"	2023	Non-album singles
"Creepy"	2023	Non-album singles
"Dead End"	2023	Non-album singles
"Trendy"	2023	Non-album singles
"Floyd"	2023	Non-album singles
"Tony Dim"	2023	Non-album singles
"Treacherous"	2023	Non-album singles
"Jokery"	2023	Non-album singles
"Infactyou8it"	2023	Non-album singles
"Dent Yo Doe"	2023	Non-album singles
"Blacklist"	2023	Non-album singles
"Gun Out"	2023	Non-album singles
"Godly Lookin'"	2023	Non-album singles
"Steal Phones"	2023	Non-album singles
"The 25th"	2023	Non-album singles
"Draydo"	2023	Non-album singles
"Super Jump"	2023	Non-album singles
"Wetemuh"	2023	Non-album singles
"Wildlife"	2024	Non-album singles
"Free Munyun Lick"	2024	Non-album singles
"For the Real Fast 5an5"	2024	Non-album singles
"Bim"	2024	Non-album singles
"Stolo Fast"	2024	Non-album singles
"Shoot Freely"	2024	Non-album singles
"Fukk 26zombiez"	2024	Non-album singles
"Real Trench Boy"	2024	Non-album singles
"Sabatahj"	2024	Non-album singles
"Remove Wanted Level"	2024	Non-album singles
"Intervene"	2024	Non-album singles
"Asian Rock"	2024	Non-album singles
"Out of Bounds"	2024	Non-album singles
"Slithery Badge"	2024	Non-album singles
"Allowance Take"	2024	Non-album singles
"Ain't Havin No Fye"	2024	Non-album singles
"Speed Racin'"	2024	Non-album singles
"Not a Fan"	2024	Non-album singles
"Bragging Rights"	2024	Non-album singles
"Discussable"	2024	Non-album singles
"Gang Moshan"	2024	Non-album singles
"Gunsmif"	2024	Non-album singles
"Laced Max"	2024	Non-album singles
"Za Head"	2024	Non-album singles
"Giwout"	2024	Non-album singles
"Sindable"	2024	Non-album singles
"Uzi in a K5"	2024	Non-album singles
"Greg Heffley"	2024	Non-album singles
"Resident Evil"	2024	Non-album singles
"Mercenary"	2024	Non-album singles
"Look at Me!"	2024	Non-album singles
"Nuk3" (9lives with Lazer Dim 700 & Luci4)	2024	Non-album singles
"Alltime"	2024	Non-album singles
"Barnacles"	2024	Non-album singles
"iCarly"	2024	Non-album singles
"Futon"	2024	Non-album singles
"Loitering"	2024	Non-album singles
"Horseplaying"	2024	Non-album singles
"Winchester"	2024	Non-album singles
"Tempestry"	2024	Non-album singles
"Get Go"	2024	Non-album singles
"WYG" (Baby Kia featuring Lazer Dim 700)	2024	Non-album singles
"Which Way"	2024	Non-album singles
"Murderman" (Trippie Redd featuring Lazer Dim 700 & VonOff1700)	2024	Non-album singles
"Vs"	2024	Non-album singles
"Do Dat" (Brennan Jones featuring Lazer Dim 700)	2024	Non-album singles
"Black Ops II"	2024	Non-album singles
"Surprisingly"	2024	Non-album singles
"Darklist"	2024	Non-album singles
"007"	2024	Non-album singles
"Wikkid"	2024	Non-album singles
"Archer"	2024	Non-album singles
"Yeah" (Ola Runt featuring Lazer Dim 700)	2024	Non-album singles
"Load Out" (Benji Blue Bills featuring Lazer Dim 700)	2024	Non-album singles
"Still in the Paint" (Denzel Curry featuring Lazer Dim 700 & Bktherula)	2024	Non-album singles
"Twan Flame" (Lil Bread featuring Lazer Dim 700)	2024	Non-album singles
