= Joey Valence & Brae =

American hip-hop duo

- Joey Valence (right) & Brae (left) performing in 2022

Background information
- Also known as: JVB
- Origin: State College, Pennsylvania, U.S.
- Genres: Punk rap; rap rock; nerdcore; experimental hip-hop; electronica
- Years active: 2021–present
- Label: RCA
- Members: Joseph Bertolino; Braedan Lugue
- Website: www.jvbsucks.com

Joey Valence & Brae are an American hip-hop duo from State College, Pennsylvania, consisting of rappers Joseph Bertolino (Joey Valence) and Braedan Lugue (Brae). The duo started making music together in 2021 and released a series of singles. Their breakout single, "Punk Tactics" has been certified RIAA Gold. They have since released three studio albums: Punk Tactics, No Hands, and Hyperyouth.

== History ==
In 2017, Bertolino received his high school diploma from State College Area High School, and Lugue graduated from Bellefonte Area High School. They met during their freshman year at Pennsylvania State University, where they became friends and started creating music together. Their first single "Crank It Up" was released in 2021. They quickly went from college kids to DIY sensations, thanks to viral hit "Double Jump," which they parlayed into an EP, 2022’s The Underground Sound.

Their seventh single "Punk Tactics" was released in 2022. The song was compared to the music of the Beastie Boys (Bertolino calling them their "number #1 influence and inspiration") and older alternative hip-hop songs, with frequent references to video games, recent pop culture and internet memes. The track was RIAA Gold certified in 2025 and was showcased in the background of the trailer of the 2026 movie Street Fighter. The music video for the song was entirely filmed on a Nintendo DSi.

In February 2022, the duo was featured as special guests on The Ellen DeGeneres Show, and later appeared at the So What Music Festival in May, and Aftershock Festival in October. Their debut album, Punk Tactics, was released on September 8, 2023.

They opened alongside the Interrupters on Sum 41's final tour, Tour of the Setting Sum. Their second album No Hands was released on June 7, 2024 and featured contributions from Z-Trip, Terror Reid and Danny Brown. In 2024, the duo was featured on Pendulum's song "Napalm". Later that year they would release the deluxe version of No Hands, including three new songs, a remix of "The Baddest" featuring Ayesha Erotica and a cover of the Charli XCX song "365".

In 2025, the duo released the single "Clover" in collaboration with fellow American rapper IDK. On June 13, 2025, they released a collaborative single with American rapper JPEGMafia titled "Wassup". Their third studio album, Hyperyouth, released on August 15, 2025. It is their first release through RCA.

== Discography ==
=== Studio albums ===
Title	Details	Peak chart positions
Title	Details	UK R&B
Punk Tactics	Released: September 8, 2023; Label: JVB Records; Format: CD, digital download, streaming	—
No Hands	Released: June 7, 2024; Label: JVB Records; Format: CD, vinyl, digital download, streaming	18
Hyperyouth	Released: August 15, 2025; Label: JVB Records, RCA; Format: CD, vinyl, digital download, streaming	

=== EPs ===
Title	Details
The Underground Sound	Released: February 25, 2022; Label: JVB Records; Format: Digital download, streaming

=== Singles ===
Title	Year	Certifications	Album
"Crank It Up"	2021		The Underground Sound EP
"Underground Sound"	2021		The Underground Sound EP
"Like What"	2021		The Underground Sound EP
"I'm Fresh"	2021		The Underground Sound EP
"Double Jump"	2021		The Underground Sound EP
"Punk Tactics"	2022	RIAA: Gold	Punk Tactics
"Tanaka"	2022		Punk Tactics
"Can't Stop Now"	2023		No Hands
"The Baddest"	2024		No Hands
"The Baddest (Badder)" (featuring Ayesha Erotica)	2024		No Hands (Deluxe Edition)
"Wassup" (featuring JPEGMafia)	2025		Hyperyouth
"Hyperyouth" / "Live Right"	2025		Hyperyouth
"See U Dance" (featuring Rebecca Black)	2025		Hyperyouth

=== Features ===
Title	Year	Album
"Tactix" (Eptic featuring Joey Valence & Brae)	2023	Non-album single
"Fracture" (Apashe featuring Flux Pavillion and Joey Valence & Brae)	2023	Antagonist
"Heard It Like This" (ACRAZE featuring Joey Valence & Brae)	2023	Non-album single
"Napalm" (Pendulum featuring Joey Valence & Brae)	2024	Inertia
"Raw" (6ix featuring Joey Valence & Brae, Felix!, Buddy, Kyle, and Blu)	2025	Homebody
"Clover" (IDK featuring Joey Valence & Brae)	2025	Non-album single

=== Tours ===
- JVB Summer 2022 Tour
- JVB Welcome to the Club Tour (2023)
- Punk Tactics Tour (2024)
- No Hands Tour (2024)
- Hyperyouth Tour (2025)
- Hyperyouth Tour (2026)
