= Working on Dying =

American producer collective

- Logo of Working on Dying

Background information
- Origin: Philadelphia, Pennsylvania, U.S.
- Genres: Hip hop; trap; rage; tread
- Years active: 2012−present
- Members: F1lthy; Oogie Mane; Trizzianna; Brandon Finnesin; Loosie Man; FaxOnly; Jarek+; Swaggyono; 1srael; ShaunGoBrazy; Bnyx; BeautifulMvn; Nvbeel
- Past members: Forza; Alien; ilykimchi
- Website: workingondying.com

Working on Dying is an American producer collective based in Philadelphia, Pennsylvania. It was formed in 2012 by American record producer Richard Ortiz, known professionally as F1lthy, and his younger brother, Jordan Ortiz, who is known professionally as Oogie Mane.

== History ==
=== Foundation ===
Beginning in 2012, F1lthy began developing production skills on FL Studio over a period of six months after being inspired by the then upcoming underground rapper and producer SpaceGhostPurrp and the rap group Metro Zu, both from Miami, Florida. F1lthy later shared his production work with Oogie Mane.

Forza, who lived nearby, would skateboard with the brothers in middle school. Oogie Mane and Forza would later be introduced to Lil Uzi Vert in 2013 while they were freshmen attending Northeast High School. Jarek, the godbrother of F1lthy and Oogie Mane, then introduced the two to The Loosieman, who was a rapper at the time under the name Declan?. The group adopted the name Working on Dying in memory of The Loosieman's father who died at the time.

My father died of cancer the day after I turned 18, ... I was in a car, I had a glass of whiskey, driving, and I was like, 'Shit, I’m really working on dying right now'

— Loosie Man

Oogie Mane had his first notable productions in late 2013 on Xavier Wulf's "The Alpha K9' and Chris Travis' "Another Planet" and "Night Ryder". Working on Dying's debut tape was The Loosieman Presents: Working On Dying, released on January 3, 2014. The tape featured ambient synths mixed with vocals from Lil B, Gucci Mane and a TED Talk about death from Peter Saul, an intensive care unit specialist. At this time, Forza was not heavily involved in the group as he was pursuing interests in football and skateboarding, though he would become more involved a year later.

Brandon Finessin, who was a close friend of the group during high school, would learn how to make beats from F1lthy and joined the team officially around the same time. Working on Dying began to reach out to Black Kray and Goth Money, establishing more connections within the underground community, while Oogie Mane's production on Lil Uzi Vert's mixtape The Real Uzi brought more recognition when released in late 2014.

=== Tread style ===
Tread
- Stylistic origins: Trap; cloud rap; phonk; lo-fi; chopped & screwed
- Cultural origins: Mid-2010s Philadelphia
- Typical instruments: Vocals; synthesizer; sampler; drum machine (Roland TR-808)

Working on Dying is often attributed with creating the trap sub-genre tread, which was coined by frequent collaborator Bootychaaain. The genre is characterized by futuristic synthesisers, slowed down samples, busier drum programming with distinctive 808 patterns, high tempo (usually set around 160 to 190), usually having off-beat hi-hats in addition to trap's triplets and a fast style of lethargic rapping. It's also usual for producers to take influences from cloud rap such as lushy synth pads and reverb-heavy atmospheric production.

Forza has been credited with tuning 808s into a unique style that would later develop into tread. According to WOBC-FM, production by Forza included "his signature high tempo drums and unconventional 808 patterns that automatically makes you want to mosh", describing him as "a pioneer in the underground’s Soundcloud scene". One of the first works recognized as proliferating tread rap was 5 Finger Posse's mixtape Trapped in the Trenches, produced by Working on Dying.

As tread became more established, Working on Dying would then promote their music through weekly releases called "Tread Tuesdays", a play on Kanye West's GOOD Fridays. Various rappers would be involved with the popularity of tread rap including Lucki, Lil Yachty, Black Kray, Hi-C, WiFiGawd, 5 Finger Posse, Chxpo and others. The collective's persistent promotion through live performances, internet streams and consistent releases would pay off and bring them into the mainstream rap scene.

=== Mainstream success ===
In 2017, Philadelphia rapper Matt Ox – 12 years old at the time – went viral on Twitter with his song "Pretty Penny", grabbing the attention of F1lthy and Oogie Mane, the latter of whom produced the track "Overwhelming", which saw viral success. During this time, record labels began rapidly reaching out to F1lthy. In response, he sought the help of veteran Philadelphia rapper and producer Finesse, who managed the label as of 2018. Finesse began his career as an associate of the Roots and Dice Raw. Eventually, he earned a master's degree in business. With Working on Dying, Finesse took over the collective, became CEO, formed an LLC, and hired lawyers to develop it into a company.

Following the introduction of Finesse's management, Working on Dying would see their first mainstream successes in 2018, with Oogie Mane producing the song "I'm Upset" for Drake's album Scorpion while the group saw further credits on Matt Ox's debut album Ox, along with Juice Wrld and Future's collaborative album Wrld on Drugs. At this time, Complex included Working on Dying on their 9 Producers to Watch in 2018 article.

Controversy arose in 2019 when parts of Lil Uzi Vert's Eternal Atake began to leak online. Lil Uzi Vert accused Working on Dying producer Forza of leaking the music and threatened to assault the producer; Forza responded by threatening suicide. Finesse responded to the situation by firing Forza, stating "When you find out heavy accusations you don't be quick to take action, you gotta figure it out. You have to gather the evidence, and we did. It's a hard decision we had to make".

F1lthy produced various songs for Playboi Carti's 2020 album Whole Lotta Red, including opener "Rockstar Made", with Danny Schwartz writing in Rolling Stone's review of the album "Whole Lotta Red notably marks a breakthrough for Working on Dying producer F1lthy, whose heavy distortion on standouts like “Stop Breathing” and “On That Time” supplies much of the album's adrenal punk energy. His beats set the tone for the first 12 songs, a turbulent sequence that pretty much exists for the singular purpose of moshing. In 2021, Working on Dying collaborated with Freddie Gibbs on his single "Gang Signs" featuring Schoolboy Q.

On September 2, 2022, rising rapper Yeat released a single titled "Talk" produced by Bnyx, another member of Working On Dying. On September 9, Yeat released his highly anticipated extended play, Lyfe. Six out of the twelve songs were produced by Bnyx, including the single "Talk," as well as "Flawlëss" featuring Lil Uzi Vert, "Out thë way," "Wat it feel lykë," electric guitar boasted "Can't stop it," and closing track "Killin ëm." Songs like "Out thë way" and "Talk" trended on social media app TikTok, influencing and praising Bnyx's work on the album. Lyfë charted at #10 on the Billboard 200. Bnyx has worked with Yeat in the past, especially on Yeat's mixtape 4L on the song "Forëally/4LY," and "Tonka 2" on Yeat's extended play Trendi.

On February 24, 2023, Yeat released his highly anticipated third studio album Afterlyfe, featuring production from Bnyx on eight songs, which are "No morë talk," "Nun id change," "Now," featuring Yeat's alter ego Luh geeky, "Slamm," "Sum 2 do," "Back home," and closing tracks "Dëmon tied," and "Mysëlf". Bnyx stated that "Mysëlf" and "Cant stop it" from Yeat's extended play Lyfë were originally supposed to be the same song, but they were split into two. Yeat had previously shown snippets of most of these songs on Instagram. On the outro track to AfterLyfe, titled "Myself," Bnyx has been credited on some background vocals over the very emotional and laid back beat. In a call on Yeat's affiliated Discord server following the release, Bnyx stated that his younger brother, BeautifulMvn, helped produce two tracks with him.

Bnyx would go on to produce the single Search & Rescue released by Canadian rapper and singer Drake in April, along with his younger brother BeautifulMvn. In June, Lil Uzi Vert would release their third studio album Pink Tape, and on the track "Aye" (featuring Travis Scott) Bnyx has production credits. A month later he would co-produce Kash Krabs' (Oddwin) song "DYNASTY" with producers Harz and Snapz. In the same month, Bnyx would appear as a co-producer on Travis Scott, Bad Bunny, and the Weeknd's song "K-pop".

== Discography ==
=== Albums ===
List of albums
Title	Details
Working on Dying (with Bladee)	Released: December 28, 2017; Label: Year0001; Format: Digital download, streaming
Waiting to Die	Released: December 4, 2020; Label: Universal; Format: Digital download, streaming
Outta Here Soon (with NxG)	Released: October 29, 2021; Label: Simple Stupid Records; Format: Digital download, streaming
Cold Visions (with Bladee)	Released: April 24, 2024; Label: Trash Island; Format: Digital download, streaming

=== Mixtapes ===
List of mixtapes
Title	Details
LSMN	Released: July 21, 2015; Label: Self-released; Format: Digital download, streaming
This And That	Released: September 19, 2015; Label: Self-released; Format: Digital download, streaming
Tread Mixxx	Released: May 21, 2016; Label: Self-released; Format: Digital download, streaming

=== Singles ===
List of singles
Title	Year	Album
"Money Shot" (featuring Robb Banks)	2020	Waiting to Die
"Break Up With Your Boyfriend" (featuring KEY! & Quadie Diesel)	2020	Waiting to Die
"Off the Lead" (featuring Lancey Foux)	2020	Waiting to Die
"Find Me" (with Lucki)	2020	Waiting to Die
"The Madness" (with Father and Zack Fox)	2020	Waiting to Die
"Stop The World" (with Tate Kobang)	2021	Non-album single

== See also ==
- Raider Klan
