= Bktherula =

American rapper (born 2002)

- Rodriguez in 2026

Background information
- Also known as: Bk; TheRula; Santanny
- Born: Brooklyn Candida Rodriguez; 2002; Atlanta, Georgia, U.S.
- Genres: Hip hop; trap; plugg; SoundCloud rap
- Occupations: Rapper; singer; songwriter
- Years active: 2015–present
- Label: Warner
- Member of: The Scythe

Brooklyn Candida Rodriguez (born c. 2002), known professionally as Bktherula (styled BKTHERULA), is an American rapper and singer from Atlanta, Georgia. She gained prominence on SoundCloud in 2018 with her singles "Faygo" and "Left Right".

== Early life ==
Born in 2002, Brooklyn Candida Rodriguez was raised in Atlanta, Georgia in a Roman Catholic household. Her mother was a singer, and her father was a rapper in a 1990s group called Planet X that opened for A Tribe Called Quest. She grew up influenced by the mix of old-school hip-hop and R&B in her home, including the sounds of acts like Tribe and Michael Jackson.

Rodriguez recorded her first song at the age of 9 on a tape recorder. She started uploading songs to SoundCloud at the age of 13. Discovered on Instagram by some young creatives who became friends and supporters, she began performing live at age 15. But in high school she was bullied and left after her sophomore year to be homeschooled.

== Career ==
=== 2018–2023 ===
Bktherula began getting traction on the streaming platform SoundCloud in 2018 with the release of her singles "Faygo" and "Left Right". In 2020, her song "Tweakin' Together" went viral on social media platform TikTok. In January 2020, she released her single "On Me" and her mixtapes Nirvana and Love Santana. Early in 2020 Bktherula produced her own festival, RULAFEST.

Millions of plays of tracks such as "Tweakin' Together" helped lead to her July 2020 signing with Warner Records. Pitchfork highlighted her first Warner single, "Summer." In 2021 Warner released her album Love Black, which included the single "Placement" featuring Matt Ox.

In March 2022, she released two singles titled "Keep da K" and "Coupe" and collaborated with Rico Nasty on the track "Vaderz." In August 2022, she performed at Rolling Loud in Miami.

In February 2023, she released her mixtape LVL5 P1, from which she earned the No. 2 spot on Rolling Stone's 2023 list of "50 Innovators Shaping Rap's Next 50 Years."

That year, she modeled for fashion designer Mowalola Ogunlesi at London Fashion Week and featured in a Marc Jacobs fashion campaign along with Debbie Harry and Lila Moss.

Also in 2023 she collaborated with NBA YoungBoy on a new remix of her song "Crazy Girl."

=== 2024–present ===
Forbes named Bktherula to its "30 Under 30" list for 2024.

In March 2024, Bktherula released LVL5 P2, the sequel to LVL5 P1. An Alternative Press profile described her as a "genre-bending rapper and singer-songwriter" with a "distinct and experimental sound that continuously pushes the boundaries of rap." In the spring she was a support act on part of Pink Pantheress's "Capable of Love" North American tour. On June 14, 2024 Bktherula performed for Lyrical Lemonade's 2024 Summer Smash in Chicago. In late 2024, she joined Ice Spice on her Y2K! World Tour in Europe.

On June 27, 2025, Bktherula released her fourth studio album, Lucy, the name of a character Bktherula conceived as a kind of spiritual alter ego, with inspiration from several sources: Saint Lucy; the 3.2 million-year-old female hominin known as "Lucy"; and the title character of the Scarlett Johansson film Lucy because that Lucy, Bktherula said, "basically accesses 100 percent of her brain." The advance singles included "BBGirlGoSlow" with Ty Dolla $ign, and "Big Feeling" which went viral on TikTok. The album included five songs Bktherula recorded herself while staying in Joshua Tree, California. Her "Lucy Experience Tour" supporting the album included shows at Irving Plaza in New York City, ZeyZey Miami, and the Sinclair in Cambridge, Massachusetts.

Also in 2025, Bktherula was featured on Coi Leray's September single "Pink Money."

Her January 2026 single "Big Feeling" received more than 17 million streams on Spotify by June. Her 2026 tour schedule included appearances at Middle Tennessee State University with GloRilla and at First Class Fest 2026 in North York, Ontario, Canada.

Her May 2026 single "I Go Punk," her first collaboration with hardcore producer Whethan, was a blend of rap and EDM that marked her entrance into the EDM space. It was the first single from her announced summer 2026 album N5ON. A summer 2026 European tour consisting of headline shows and festival appearances was announced in May.

== The Scythe ==
In January 2026, rap supergroup The Scythe was formed, featuring Bktherula, Denzel Curry, TiaCorine, ASAP Ferg, and Key Nyata as members. (Bktherula had worked with Curry on the October 2024 track "Still in the Paint.") The group's debut album, Strictly 4 the Scythe, was released on March 6, 2026, with the lead single "Lit Effect" featuring Curry and Bktherula.

== Discography ==
Studio albums
Title	Release date
Love Santana	January 11, 2020
Nirvana	October 23, 2020
Love Black	October 22, 2021
LVL5 P1	February 17, 2023
LVL5 P2	March 15, 2024
Lucy	June 27, 2025
N5ON	October 30, 2026

EPs
Title	Release date
Love Nirvana	June 16, 2023

Singles
Title	Year	Album
"Left Right"	2019	Non-album single
"No Crip"	2019	Non-album single
"C4"	2020	Love Santana
"Tweakin' Together"	2020	Love Santana
"Uh Huh"	2020	Love Santana
"Summer"	2020	Nirvana
"Admit It"	2020	Nirvana
"OKOK" / "Depressing"	2020	Nirvana
"Not Wock"	2021	Non-album single
"Blue" / "Santanny"	2021	Non-album single
"Keep Da K" / "Coupe"	2022	Non-album single
"Through 2 U"	2022	Love Black
"Forever Pt. 2"	2022	LVL5 P1
"Tan"	2023	LVL5 P1
"Pssyonft"	2023	LVL5 P1
"Crazy Girl Pt. 2" (with YoungBoy Never Broke Again)	2023	Non-album single
"Tatti"	2023	LVL5 P2
"It Wasn't Me"	2023	Non-album single
"Crayon"	2024	LVL5 P2
"The Way"	2024	LVL5 P2
"Adult Swim"	2024	Lucy
"Delilah"	2025	Lucy
"Bbgirlgoslow"	2025	Lucy
"Dumb Shit"	2025	Lucy
"Big Feeling"	2025	Lucy
"I Go Punk" (with Whethan)	2026	N5ON
"Addicted2U" (with Underscores)	2026	N5ON
