= Kwes Darko =

British songwriter and record producer

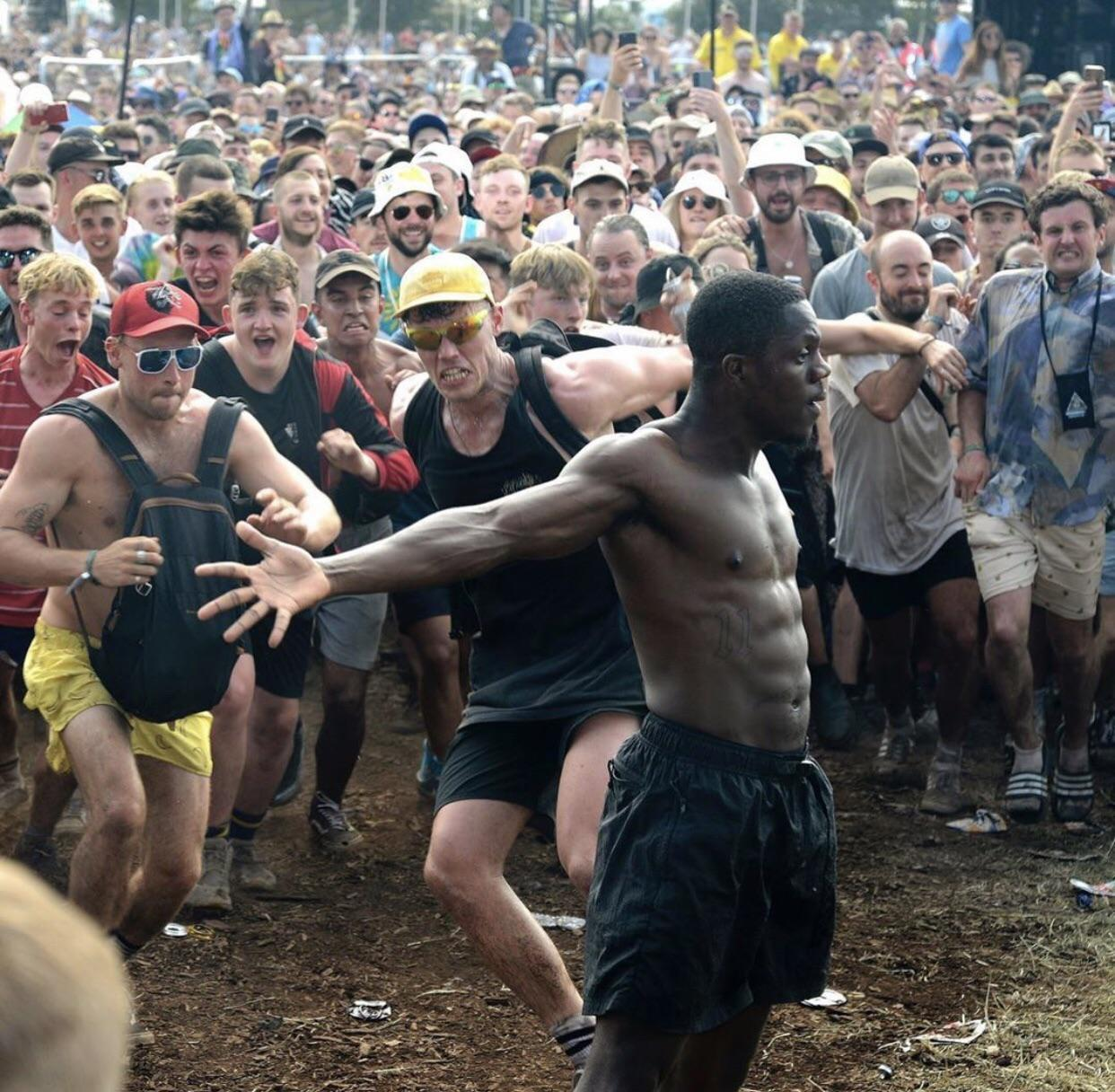
Kwes Darko at Glastonbury Festival 2019

Kwes Darko (born Kwesi Darko Obiri) is a British songwriter and producer from London, England, signed to Young Songs. He is best known for his work with UK rapper Slowthai.

Kwes Darko's first major exposure as a musician came in 2009, through his debut track entitled "Space Ex", under the moniker Blue Daisy; the track featured French singer LaNote and was named 'Best New Track' on Pitchfork. He released his debut album, The Sunday Gift in September 2011 to favourable reviews from Resident Advisor and Pitchfork Media. His mixes have been featured in Fact and Dazed & Confused.

== Discography ==
=== Singles and EPs ===
- "Space Ex", Black Acre (2009)
- Strings Detached EP, Black Acre (2009)
- Blue Daisy vs TOKiMONSTA - "USD / Free Dem", Team Acre (2010)
- Blue Daisy & Anneka - Raindrops EP, Black Acre (2010)
- 3rd Degree EP, Black Acre (2011)
- The Sunday Gift, Black Acre (2011)
- Blue Daisy x Unknown Shapes - Bedtime Stories EP, Black Acre (2012)
- Blue Daisy presents Dahlia Black - "Fuck a Rap Song" (2013)
- Blue Daisy x Unknown Shapes - Used to Give a Fuck EP, Black Acre (2013)
- Tricky featuring Blue Daisy - "My Palestine Girl", False Idols (2014)
- Blue Daisy - Psychotic Love EP, 37 Adventures (2014)
- Blue Daisy - Darker Than Blue, R&S Records (2015)
- God Of The Youth, Black Acre (2026)

=== Production ===
- Connie Constance - In the Grass EP, Black Acre (2015)
- Connie Constance - Answer, Black Acre (2015)
- Stateless - Sixfold Symmetry EP, Stateless (2015)
- Sampa the Great - Birds and the BEE9 'LP, Big Dada (2017)
- slowthai - Murder, Bone soda (2017)
- slowthai - I wish i knew EP, Bone Soda (2017)
- slowthai - The Bottom/North Nights, Method (2018)
- Harve - "Caught Up", Toyitoyi (2018)
- Harve - "reAD", Toyitoyi (2018)
- Harve - "City Scapes", Toyitoyi (2018)
- slowthai - "Ladies", Method (2018)
- slowthai - "Polaroid", Method (2018)
- slowthai - "Drug Dealer", Method (2018)
- slowthai - Runt EP, Method (2018)
- slowthai - "Rainbow", Method (2018)
- slowthai - Nothing Great About Britain, Method (2019)
- slowthai x Denzel Curry - "Psycho", Toyitoyi (2019)
- Sampa the Great - "OMG", Ninja Tune (2019)
- Meekz - Rap As
- SL x Pa Salieu - "Hit the Block", Virgin EMI (2020)
- Footsie featuring JME - Pepper Stew, Studio55 (2020)
- Harve - Held by the Moon EP, Mostly at Night (2020)
- slowthai - "Enemy", Method (2020)
- slowthai - "NHS", Method (2020)
- slowthai featuring ASAP Rocky - "Mazza", Method (2021)
- slowthai featuring Skepta - "Cancelled", Method (2021)
- slowthai - Tyron, Method (2021)
- Gazo featuring Unknown T & Pa Salieu - "Mon Cher", Epic Records (2021)
- Denzel Curry featuring PlayThatBoiZay - "Bad Luck", Loma Vista Recordings (2021)
- Laylow featuring slowthai - "Fallen Angels", Digitalmundo (2021)
- Denzel Curry featuring PlayThatBoiZay - "Let It All Hang Out", RCA Records (2022)
- slowthai - "I know nothing", Method (2022)
- slowthai - "Selfish", Method (2023)
- slowthai - "Feel Good", Method (2023)
- Overmono - "Calling Out", XL Recordings (2023)
- slowthai - Ugly, Method (2023)
