= Mike Dimes =

American rapper and singer (born 2001)

- Born: Michael C. Goode; June 18, 2001 (age 25); Killeen, Texas, U.S.
- Origin: San Antonio, Texas, U.S.
- Genres: Hip-hop; trap; plugg
- Occupations: Rapper; singer; songwriter
- Years active: 2018–present
- Label: Encore Recordings

Michael C. Goode, known professionally as Mike Dimes is an American rapper and singer from San Antonio, Texas. He is known for his single "My Story" which received traction on TikTok.

== Early life ==
Michael Goode, stage name "Mike Dimes" was born into a military family, moving across the United States, traveling to states as of Colorado & South Carolina, before settling back in his home state of Texas, where he moved to San Antonio. Later, in his sophomore year of high school, he dropped his passions for basketball and baseball, and decided to pursue a passion for music.

== Career ==
=== 2021: Breakthrough ===
In 2021, Goode came to prominence with the success of his single "My Story" on TikTok. It received around 2 billion views on the platform. He released his debut mixtape DLOG in May 2021.

=== 2022-present ===
In January 2022, Goode was selected by Spotify as one of their 10 Most Necessary Artists to Watch in 2022. In March 2022 he released his debut studio album In Dimes We Trust. In June 2022, he remixed his hit single "Home" with a feature from JID. Also in June 2022, he appeared on American rapper Jeleel's single titled "Clubhouse". In June 2023 he released his second studio album Texas Boy. He also has an appearance on Dro Kenji's album "Wish You Were Here"

== Artistry ==
Mike Dimes main influences include ASAP Rocky and Joey Badass.

== Discography ==
=== Studio albums ===
Title	EP details
In Dimes We Trust	Released: March 8, 2022; Label: Self-released; Format: Digital download, streaming
Texas Boy	Released: June 16, 2023; Label: Self-released; Format: Digital download, streaming
B.I.L.L.Y	Released: September 2, 2026; Label: Self-released; Format: Digital download, streaming

=== Mixtapes ===
Title	EP details
DLOG	Released: May 8, 2021; Label: Self-released; Format: Digital download, streaming
