= Punk rap =

Subgenre of hip-hop

- Other names: Punk trap
- Stylistic origins: Hip hop; trap; lo fi; heavy metal; punk rock
- Cultural origins: Late 2000s and early 2010s

Local scenes
- Miami, Florida; SoundCloud rap

Other topics
- Crunk; trap metal; industrial hip hop; rage; rapcore; DIY music; Weird SoundCloud

Punk rap is a fusion genre that merges punk rock and hip-hop. The genre has been described as also drawing influences from trap music, heavy metal and lo-fi.

== Characteristics ==
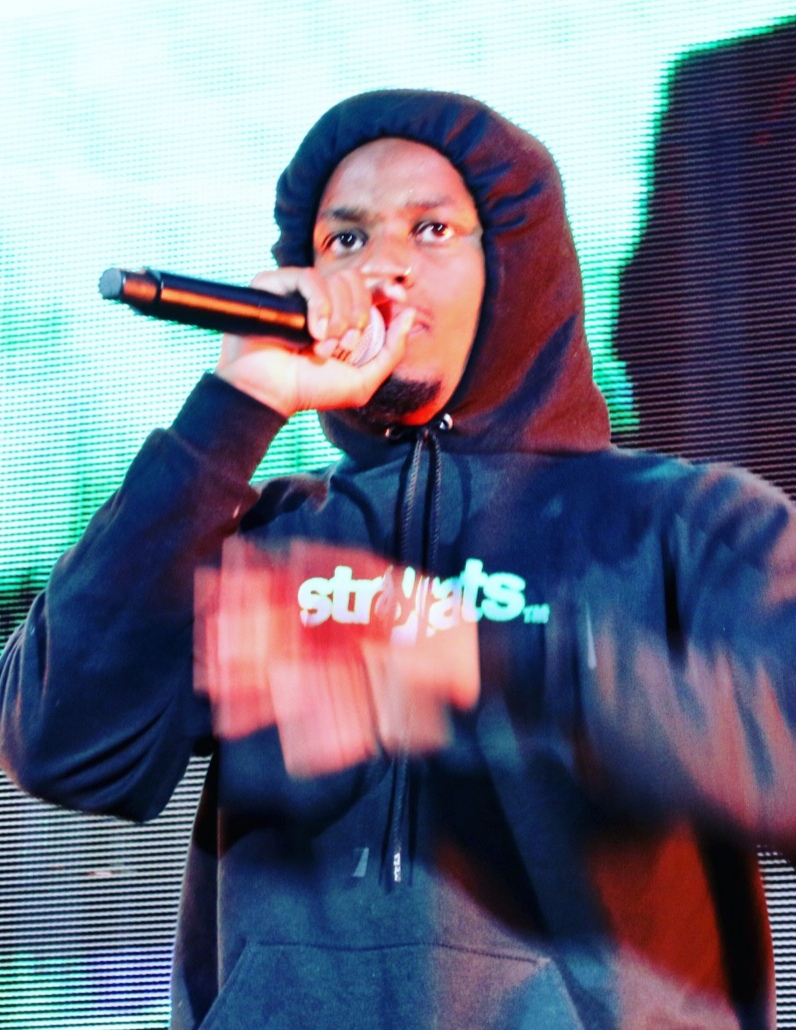
Punk rapper Denzel Curry

=== Vocals and structure ===
Some artists makes use of sonic elements of punk rock, such as screaming, whereas others make use of its attitude and melodic style. Vulture described its origins as "the product of a convergence between Atlanta trap and the devilish eclecticism of Miami predecessors like SpaceGhostPurrp". Lil Jon's harsh style of vocalization has also been cited as influence on the development of the genre.

"It's what the game needs now; Someone who doesn't give a fuck about the rules and is just going to fuck shit up."

— Ski Mask the Slump God (2017)

In a way, hardcore punk was a "radical departure" from alternative and popular music of that era; this was because it was played "louder and harder," "wasn't verse-chorus rock," and "dispelled any notion of what songwriting is supposed to be [and] it's its own form" punk rap songs share some of the "unorthodox" characteristics. They are "short, repetitive, wrapped in distortion and grimly effective."

One of the earliest proponents of the scene was Odd Future, due to their merging of hip-hop and shock humor. In an article for the BBC, journalist Thomas Hobbs referred to the rise of the genre as being a rebellion against the politics of the period, with artists showing disdain for topics such as Brexit, the presidency of Donald Trump and global warming.

== See also ==
- List of punk rap artists
