= Lil Ugly Mane discography =

Travis Miller discography
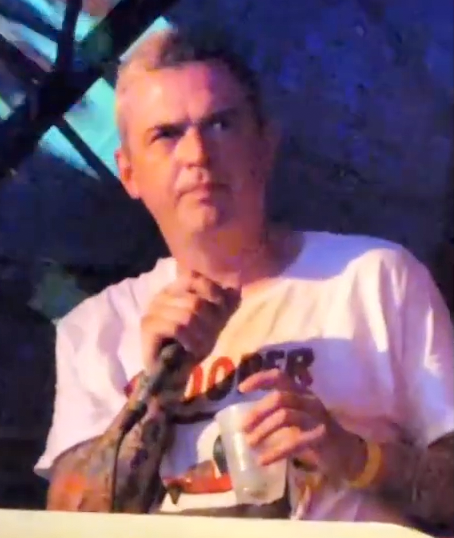
- Miller in 2022

This is a partial discography of the American musician Travis Miller, best known for his project Lil Ugly Mane.

== As Lil Ugly Mane ==
=== Studio albums ===
Title	Album details
Mista Thug Isolation	Released: February 11, 2012; Format: vinyl, digital download, streaming
Oblivion Access	Released: December 18, 2015; Format: vinyl, digital download, streaming
Volcanic Bird Enemy and the Voiced Concern	Released: October 12, 2021; Format: vinyl, digital download, streaming

=== Mixtapes ===
Title	Release info
Playaz Circle: Pre-Meditation (The First Prophecy); Preview Mixtape (Real Murder Posse Underground Version)	Released: February 1, 2011; Format: vinyl, digital download, streaming
Three Sided Tape Volume One	Released: August 7, 2013; Format: vinyl, digital download, streaming
Three Sided Tape Volume Two	Released: August 11, 2013; Format: vinyl, digital download, streaming
Absence of Shitperson	Released: June 3, 2014; Format: digital download; Contains instrumentals of 18 previously released songs
Third Side of Tape	Released: April 29, 2015; Format: vinyl, digital download, streaming

=== EP ===
Title	Release info
Criminal Hypnosis: Unreleased Shit	Released: January 18, 2012; Format: digital download
Turns Into	Released: April 9, 2012; Format: digital download
Uneven Compromise	Released: October 28, 2012; Format: vinyl, digital download, streaming; Self released
The Weeping Worm	Released: October 26, 2014; Format: digital download
Thing s Thatare Stuff	Released: April 22, 2018; Format: digital download
I Believe the World Would Be a Better Place Without You	Released: June 12, 2022; Format: digital download, streaming

=== Singles ===
Title	Single details
"DEY BOUT 2 FIND YO BODY(DA BIRTH OF A MURDERAH) DEMO"	Released: March 10, 2010
"U Aint From My Hood"	Released: March 27, 2011
"Bust a Sag da Single"	Released: April 19, 2011
"Send Em 2 tha Essence"	Released: February 6, 2012; Appears as a bonus track in Mista Thug Isolation
"Wishmaster (Schwarz Act a Fool Remix)"	Released: April 3, 2012; Remix by Schwarz
"On Doing an Evil Deed Blues"	Released: August 3, 2013
"Persistence"	Released: October 11, 2015; Appears on Oblivion Access
"Grave Within a Grave"	Released: October 30, 2015; Appears on Oblivion Access
"Loser Alert"	Released: August 2, 2017
"Super Soaker Bounce"	Released: 2020
"Porcelain Slightly" / "Into a Life"	Released: September 14, 2021; Contains slightly edited versions of songs that appear on Volcanic Bird Enemy and the Voiced Concern
"Low Tide at the Dryin' Out Facility"	Released: July 19, 2022
"Blue Sand"	Released: September 12, 2022
"Pink & Rose"	Released: October 7, 2022
"Easy Prey"	Released: October 8, 2022
"Split Ends"	Released: October 19, 2022
"Redacted Fog"	Released: November 18, 2022
"Ricochet"	Released: January 9, 2023
"Spill"	Released: December 5, 2023

=== Demos ===
Title	Release info
Oblivion Access Demo and Improvised Source Material	Released: December 18, 2023; Format: cassette, digital download

=== Compilation albums ===
Title	Release info
On Doing An Evil Deed Blues / Passion Sceptre / Dert Mystery	Released: 2014; Format: flexi disc
Underwater Tank / Lights Down Low	Released: 2014; Format: vinyl
Three Sided Tape Volume 1 & 2	Released: July 15, 2015; Format: cassette
RIP	Released: December 13, 2015
Singles	Released: 2015; Format: vinyl
Songs That People Emailed Me About Asking; Why I Hadn't Put Them on Streaming Platforms	Released: September 11, 2019; Format: streaming
Singles Collection 2022	Released: March 12, 2023; Format: vinyl, CD, cassette

=== Collaborations ===
==== Singles ====
Title	Release info
Lights Down Low	Released: May 31, 2012; With DJ Dog Dick
Underwater Tank	Released: August 9, 2012; With Antwon
See You Shine	Released: June 28, 2018; With Little Pain
Just Like You	Released: July 5, 2018; With Lil Tracy and MACKNED
Floorboards	Released: August 5, 2022; With COLD MEGA

=== Appears on ===
==== Studio albums ====
Title	Release info
Supasonic	Released: July 24, 2012; Format: vinyl, cassette, digital download; Released with Supa Sortahuman under alias Shawn Kemp - Lil Ugly Mane credited in tracks "Blazin Up" and "Ridin Thru The Hood".
Nostalgic 64 by Denzel Curry	Released: September 3, 2013; Formats: CD, digital download; In track "Mystical Virus, Pt. 3: The Scream" with Mike G
Trick Dice	Released: September 6, 2015; Format: vinyl, cassette, digital download; Released with Nickelus F under alias Shawn Kemp - Lil Ugly Mane credited in tracks "Oedipus Rex" and "Bathory Motives"
It Wasn't Even Close by Your Old Droog	Released: April 19, 2019; Formats: vinyl, cassette, CD, digital download, streaming; In track "Smores" with Wiki
Oofie by Wiki	Released: November 8, 2019; Formats: vinyl, CD, streaming; In track "Grim" with Denzel Curry
Space Bar by Your Old Droog	Released: November 29, 2019; Formats: vinyl, cassette, CD, digital download, streaming; In track "Meteor Man" with Billy Woods
Hey Tony by Tony Seltzer	Released: September 10, 2021; Formats: cassette, digital download, streaming; In track "Flowers"
Adventure Time by Supa Sortahuman	Released: November 23, 2022; Formats: cassette, streaming; In track "Higher Than Fuck"

==== EP ====
Title	Release info
13 by Denzel Curry	Released: June 26, 2017; Formats: vinyl, cassette, digital download, streaming; In track "Zeltron 6 Bilion"

==== Mixtapes ====
Title	Release info
Blackland Radio 66.6 by SpaceGhostPurrp	Released: May 1, 2011; Formats: vinyl, cassette; In track "My Hood"
God of Black by SpaceGhostPurrp	Released: February 3, 2012; In track "Txxxxxx|Twistin" with Klan Raven

==== Singles ====
Title	Release info
War Time Dub, Culture City by Culture Abuse	Released: June, 4, 2019
Meteor Man by Your Old Droog	Released: November 15, 2019; With Billy Woods

=== As a part of Secret Circle ===
==== Singles ====
Title	Single details
"Keep It Low"	Released: June 9, 2016
"Satellite"	Released: December 29, 2016; Featuring Despot
"Tube Socks"	Released: May 18, 2017
"My Way"	Released: May 23, 2017
"Tonka Truck"	Released: July 25, 2017
"Ounce of It"	Released: January 29 2018

==== Compilation ====
Title	Release Info
"Keep It Low / Satellite"	Released: July, 2017; Format: vinyl; Featuring Despot on the song Satellite

== As Bedwetter ==
=== Studio albums ===
Title	Release info
Volume 1: Flick Your Tongue Against Your Teeth and Describe the Present.	Released: January 29, 2017; Format: vinyl, cassette, digital download, streaming

=== Singles ===
Title	Release info
"Selfish"	Released: December 2016; Format: digital download
"Raging Bull"	Released: January 2017; Format: digital download
"Headboard / Here I Am"	Released: November 27, 2020; Format: cassette, digital download, streaming; "Headboard" appears on the re-release of Three Sided Tape Volume 1
"Headboard (Nineteen at the Wave Mix)"	Released: September 21, 2021; Format: digital download, streaming; Contains remix of Headboard that appears on Volcanic Bird Enemy and the Voiced Concern
"Untitled"	Released: November 27, 2020; Format: vinyl

== As Thermos Grenadine ==
=== Singles ===
Title	Release info
Christmas Cowboy	Released: September 12, 2022; Format: digital download, vinyl

== As Vudmurk ==
=== EP ===
Title	Release info
Sleep Until It Hurts You	Released: August 30, 2013; Format: digital download
Obedient Form	Released: October 2, 2021; Format: vinyl, cassette, digital download, streaming

== As Shawn Kemp ==
=== Mixtapes ===
Title	Release info
Beat Tape 2013	Released: December 18, 2023; Format: digital download

=== EP ===
Title	Release info
Softwehr	Released: October 28, 2010; Format: digital download
I Thought I Lost You	Released: April 30, 2011; Format: digital download
External Files	Released: October 30, 2012; Format: digital download

=== Collaborations ===
==== Studio albums ====
Title	Release info
Supasonic	Released: July 24, 2012; Format: vinyl, cassette, digital download; With Supa Sortahuman
Trick Dice	Released: September 6, 2015; Format: vinyl, cassette, digital download; With Nickelus F

== As A9CONCUSS ==
=== EP ===
Title	Release info
A9CONCUSS	Released: May 26, 2012

== As Across ==
=== EP ===
Title	Release info
Waiting in a Hole	Released: 2007; Format: cassette
Vorare	Released: 2009; Format: cassette
Live Songs	Released: April 10 2014; Format: digital download

=== Single ===
Title	Release info
Soft Drift	Released: 2008; Format: cassette

=== Collaborations ===
==== EP ====
Title	Release info
Across / Droughter	Released: 2009; Format: cassette; With Droughter
Material Action 4.17.09	Released: 2009; Format: CD; With Caustic Castle
Tour 2009	Released: 2009; Format: cassette; With Earth Crown

== As Boring Circumcision ==
=== Studio albums ===
Title	Release info
Drenched in Autism	Released: 2006; Format: cassette

== As Cat Torso ==
=== EP ===
Title	Release info
Fuck Strangler	Released: 2009; Format: digital download

== As Confident People ==
=== EP ===
Title	Release info
Three Songs	Released: 2010

== As Dale Kruegler & The Missing Felicitys ==
=== Studio albums ===
Title	Release info
Thug Isolation	Released: March 1, 2012

=== EP ===
Title	Release info
Funky Lady Spa E.P.	Released: 2011
Doing Badass Improvisational Stuff Rag for Piano	Released: April 4, 2018

== As Dreamo & Stormy Guy ==
=== Singles ===
Title	Release info
Look Into The Eyes Of My Heart Because They Are Weary	Released: January 1, 2006; Format: digital download
Swang Chevy (Voodoo Mix)	Released: 2015

== As a part of GKRL ==
=== EP ===
Title	Release info
Happy About It	Released: July 1 2006

== As Lordmaster DJ SK the Subterranean Suspect ==
=== EP ===
Title	Release info
Cold Rock Sex Bug	Released: September 5, 2015

== As Mystery Department ==
=== Studio album ===
Title	Release info
Perfect Roses	Released: 2010

== As Near ==
=== Single ===
Title	Release info
Honor to Wolves of Other Earths	Released: 2010

== As Public Garden ==
=== EP ===
Title	Release info
There For Him	Released: 2010; Format: cassette

=== Single ===
Title	Release info
SYMPATHY FOR TRASH	Released: January 1 2009; Format: digital download

== As Spook Lo ==
=== Single ===
Title	Release info
SUICIDAL KLOWN SOLJAH	Released: June 7 2007; Format: digital download

== As Yung Gus ==
=== Appears on ===
==== EP ====
Title	Single details
Thing s Thatare Stuff	Released: April 22, 2018; Released under alias Lil Ugly Mane - Yung Gus credited in track "losin my mind (2006 PROD SHAWN KEMP)"

=== As a part of The Legacy ===
==== Studio album ====
Title	Single details
Demo 2006	Released: June 9, 2006

== Released under various alliases ==
=== Compilation album ===
Title	Release info	Released under
Register	Released: February 7 2017; Contains multiple older works of Miller released under different aliases	Mystery Department; Silver Crumbs; Seidhr; Across; Public Garden; Rats; Confident People

== Other releases credited to Travis Miller ==
=== Studio albums ===
Title	Release info
STUDY OF THE HYPOTHESIZED REMOVABLE AND/OR EXPANDABLE NATURE OF HUMAN CAPABILITY AND LIMITATIONS PRIMARILY REGARDING INTRODUCTORY EXPERIENCES WITH NEW AND EXCITING TECHNOLOGIES BY WAY OF MOTIVATIONAL INCENTIVE VOLUME ONE	Released: October 11 2012; Contains tracks that were sent to Miller
STUDY OF THE HYPOTHESIZED REMOVABLE AND/OR EXPANDABLE NATURE OF HUMAN CAPABILITY AND LIMITATIONS PRIMARILY REGARDING INTRODUCTORY EXPERIENCES WITH NEW AND EXCITING TECHNOLOGIES BY WAY OF MOTIVATIONAL INCENTIVE VOLUME TWO	Released: October 24 2012; Contains tracks that were sent to Miller
ENTERTANERS BLUELS FOR ONCE MICALE JACKSON THRILER	Released: August 30, 2013; Contains the contents of a cassette tape Miller found at a thrift store
