= Oblivion Access =

Studio album by Lil Ugly Mane
- Released: December 18, 2015
- Recorded: 2014–early 2015
- Genre: Experimental hip hop; industrial hip hop; noise
- Length: 43:56
- Producer: Shawn Kemp

Lil Ugly Mane chronology
Third Side of Tape (2015)	Oblivion Access (2015)	Things Thatare Stuff (2018)

Travis Miller chronology
Trick Dice (as Shawn Kemp, with Nickelus F) (2015)	Oblivion Access (2015)	Volume 1: Flick Your Tongue Against Your Teeth and Describe the Present. (as Bedwetter) (2017)

Oblivion Access is the second studio album by American rapper Lil Ugly Mane. It was self-released via Bandcamp on December 18, 2015, with a vinyl release by Ormolycka Records. Released with the intent to be the final Lil Ugly Mane studio album, it stood as such until the release of Volcanic Bird Enemy and the Voiced Concern (2021).

== Legacy ==
Oblivion Access Festival, on which Lil Ugly Mane performed multiple times, was named after this album.

== Oblivion Access Demo and Improvised Source Material ==
On December 18, 2023, Lil Ugly Mane released OBLIVION ACCESS DEMO AND IMPROVISED SOURCE MATERIAL, containing demo versions of songs in original Oblivion Access and noise session from which sounds were used in Oblivion Access. This release also contains demo versions of songs released under the name Bedwetter in Vol. 1: Flick Your Tongue Against Your Teeth and Describe the Present.

== Track listing ==
All tracks are written by Lil Ugly Mane (Travis Miller).

Oblivion Access
No.	Title	Length
1.	"Ejaculated Poisoned Wrench"	2:05
2.	"Columns"	2:31
3.	"Grave Within a Grave"	3:54
4.	"Opposite Lanes"	3:53
5.	"Achilles Foot"	2:13
6.	"Collapse and Appear"	6:49
7.	"Leonard's Lake"	3:50
8.	"Warmest Flag"	1:23
9.	"Persistence"	3:54
10.	"Drain Counter"	3:03
11.	"Slugs"	3:44
12.	"Compliance"	1:26
13.	"Intent and Purulent Discharge"	5:11
Total length:		43:56

OBLIVION ACCESS DEMO AND IMPROVISED SOURCE MATERIAL
No.	Title	Length
1.	"Improvised Source Material"	27:32
2.	"Demo"	32:12
3.	"Betwetter Demos"	7:58
Total length:		67:43

=== Notes ===
- All tracks are stylized in all caps on Bandcamp. For example, "Warmest Flag" is stylized as "WARMEST FLAG" on Bandcamp.
