= Mista Thug Isolation =

Studio album by Lil Ugly Mane
- Released: February 11, 2012
- Recorded: 2011; Baltimore, Maryland
- Genres: Southern hip hop; Memphis rap; trap; phonk; cloud rap; horrorcore
- Length: 64:26
- Label: Self-released
- Producer: Shawn Kemp

Lil Ugly Mane chronology
Criminal Hypnosis: Unreleased Shit (2012)	Mista Thug Isolation (2012)	Uneven Compromise (2012)

Travis Miller chronology
Criminal Hypnosis: Unreleased Shit (as Lil Ugly Mane) (2012)	Mista Thug Isolation (2012)	Thug Isolation (as Dale Kruegler & The Missing Felicitys) (2012)

Alternative cover
- Bandcamp cover

Mista Thug Isolation is the debut studio album by American rapper Lil Ugly Mane. It was self-released via Bandcamp on February 11, 2012, with a vinyl release by Hundebiss Records. The album is entirely self-produced as Shawn Kemp, with guest appearances from Supa Sortahuman and Denzel Curry.

== Background ==
The album attracted attention in the underground hip hop scene for its Memphis rap-inspired sound and would bring Lil Ugly Mane to mainstream popularity after also previously appearing on SpaceGhostPurrp's debut mixtape Blackland Radio 66.6 in 2011. Members of hip hop collective Odd Future, Tyler, the Creator, and Earl Sweatshirt showed support for Lil Ugly Mane and the album, specifically the song "Throw Dem Gunz".

The songs "Radiation (Lung Pollution)", "Lookin 4 Tha Suckin", and "Twistin" were previously on Lil Ugly Mane's 2012 mixtape Criminal Hypnosis: Unreleased Shit. "Twistin" was also released previously on Denzel Curry's 2012 mixtape King of the Mischievous South, Vol. 1.

== Critical reception ==
Professional ratings
Review scores
Source	Rating
Pitchfork	8.2/10

In a retrospective review, Pitchfork's Andy O'Connor gave the album a positive review, stating: "A project such as Isolation has the potential to have 'tourist' written all over it, but the most surprising thing about Miller is that he has serious bars. While he traffics in the same boastfulness rife in hip-hop, he’s got a gift for absurdity with the strangest and catchiest lyricism."

Music publication Impose Magazine appreciated Lil Ugly Mane’s "oddball wordplay" and production variety, likening some moments to a lo-fi artifact from a hidden Memphis mixtape and highlighting the album’s ability to navigate terror, though it also noted length as points of critique.

== Turns Into ==
On April 9, 2012, Lil Ugly Mane released EP titled Turns Into, which contained 5 identical tracks titled Foreshadow. All 15 second tracks contained quotes by Montgomery Schuyler. The cover art of Turns Into features a rotated version of Mista Thug Isolation.

== Track listing ==
- All tracks are produced by Lil Ugly Mane (Travis Miller), under his production alias Shawn Kemp.

Standard release
No.	Title	Length
1.	"Mista Thug Isolation (12th Movement)"	2:48
2.	"Serious Shit"	3:36
3.	"Maniac Drug Dealer III"	2:07
4.	"Radiation (Lung Pollution)" (featuring Supa Sortahuman)	4:31
5.	"Slick Rick"	4:15
6.	"Wishmaster"	3:59
7.	"Alone and Suffering (Interlude)"	1:51
8.	"Bitch I'm Lugubrious"	4:32
9.	"Cup Fulla Beetlejuice"	3:30
10.	"Breeze Em Out"	3:36
11.	"Hoeish Ass Bitch"	3:56
12.	"Mona Lisa Overdrive"	3:30
13.	"Twistin'" (featuring Denzel Curry)	4:21
14.	"No Slack in My Mack"	5:30
15.	"Lookin 4 tha Suckin"	3:00
16.	"Lean Got Me Fucked Up"	4:12
17.	"Throw Dem Gunz"	3:27
18.	"Last Breath (Outroduction)"	1:45
Total length:		64:26

Bonus tracks
No.	Title	Length
19.	"Bitch I'm Lugubrious (Cold Shoulder Edit)"	3:48
20.	"Send Em 2 tha Essence"	5:24
Total length:		73:38

=== Notes ===
- "Serious Shit" contains a sample of "Blue Mosque" by Don Rendell Ian Carr Quintet, "I Call Shots" by Kurupt and Roscoe, and "Kicking'n Doors" by Frayser Click
- "Maniac Drug Dealer III" contains a sample of "Seduction & Pursuit" by Christopher Young
- "Radiation (Lung Pollution)" contains a sample of "Love's Been Here & Gone" by James Ingram and the intro the album 19 Nigga 4 by Indo G and Lil Blunt
- "Slick Rick" contains a sample of "Fuck That Hoe" by Gimisum Family and a sample and interpolation of "Treat Her Like a Prostitute" by Slick Rick
- "Wishmaster" contains a sample of "Don't You Wish You Could Be There" by Crackin'
- "Alone and Suffering" contains a sample of "Funky President (People It's Bad)" by James Brown
- "Bitch I'm Lugubrious" contains a sample of "Erratic Behavior" by Wicked Witch and the side B intro to Bass Mix Part 3 by DJ Fela & DJ Rod
- "Breeze Em Out" contains a sample of "Remember Why (It's Christmas)" by Alexander O'Neal
- "Hoeish Ass Bitch" contains a sample of "Hoeish Ass Niggaz" by DJ Sound, the side A intro to Greatest Hitz by Criminal Manne, and the side B intro to Bass Mix Part 3 by DJ Fela & DJ Rod
- "Mona Lisa Overdrive" contains a sample of "I Love You More and More" and "There's Nothing in This World That Can Stop Me from Loving You" by Tom Brock
- "Twistin'" contains a sample of "A Prophet Named K.G." by Dexter Wansel and "Dat's How I'm Livin'" by DJ Yella and B.G. Knocc Out
- "No Slack in my Mack" contains a sample of "No, I'm Not Dat Nigga" by Three 6 Mafia
- "Lookin' 4 tha Suckin" contains a sample of "The Chewin'" and "Make a Stang" by DJ Fela & DJ Rod and "Some Cut" by Trillville and Cutty
- "Lean Got Me Fucked Up" contains a sample of the film "La dama rossa uccide sette volte", the intro to the series Tales from the Darkside by Donald Rubenstein, and a skit from the mixtape Strictly for That Nigga by Lady Bee
- "Throw Dem Gunz" contains a sample of "Small Cafe" by Leon Ware
- "Last Breath (Outroduction)" contains a sample of "The Last Night" by Eugene Wilde
- "Send Em 2 Tha Essence" contains a sample of "Sofa Rockers" by Kruder & Dorfmeister and a sample of "Freddy's Nightmares" by Derek Wadsworth
- All tracks are stylized in all caps on Bandcamp. For example, "Throw Dem Gunz" is stylized as "THROW DEM GUNZ" on Bandcamp.
