= Crank (Playboi Carti song) =

2025 song by Playboi Carti

Song by Playboi Carti

from the album Music
- Released: March 14, 2025
- Genre: Rage
- Length: 2:27
- Label: AWGE; Interscope
- Songwriters: Jordan Carter; Ronald LaTour Jr.; Daveon Jackson; John Julian; Jason Pounds; Markese Rolle
- Producers: Cardo; Yung Exclusive; Johnny Juliano

"Crank" (stylized in all caps) is a song by American rapper Playboi Carti. It was released through AWGE and Interscope Records as the thirteenth track from Carti's third studio album, Music, on March 14, 2025. The song was written by Playboi Carti and Jason "J. LBS" Pounds, alongside producers Cardo, Daveon "Yung Exclusive" Jackson, and Johnny Juliano. It contains a sample of "Fuck Taylor Gang (Not a Diss We Are Just Not Dickriders)" by SpaceGhostPurrp and DJ Swamp Izzo's vocals from the song.

== Critical reception ==
Billboard ranked it as the 18th best song from Music, with Angel Diaz commenting "Playboi and Swamp make a good team, as the former raps bars like, 'I'm prayin' for all my opps while I'm hawking for my next bi—h/Oh, you prayin' for them motherf—kers now, Carti?/Yeah, they got a death wish,' as the latter screams ad libs in the background as if he was on crank for real." Christian Eede of The Quietus described the song as "highly addictive".

== Personnel ==
Credits and personnel adapted from Tidal.

Musicians

- Jordan Carter – vocals
- Ronald LaTour, Jr. – production
- Daveon Jackson – production
- Johnny Juliano – production

Technical

- Ojivolta – mastering
- Marcus Fritz – mixing, recording

== Charts ==
Chart performance for "Crank"
Chart (2025)	Peak position
Australia Hip Hop/R&B (ARIA)	40
Canada Hot 100 (Billboard)	66
Global 200 (Billboard)	67
Lithuania (AGATA)	53
US Billboard Hot 100	55
US Hot R&B/Hip-Hop Songs (Billboard)	28
