= Jeremiah J. Hamilton =

American politician from Texas

Member of the Texas House of Representatives from the 26th district
- In office February 9, 1870 – January 14, 1873

Personal details
- Born: July 1, 1838 Tennessee
- Died: 1905 (aged 66–67)
- Party: Republican

Jeremiah J. Hamilton (July 1, 1838 – 1905) was a school founder, carpenter, political organizer, and legislator in Texas.

He was born a slave July 1, 1838 in Tennessee then taken to Texas in 1847.

He served as the secretary of the Texas State Central Committee of Colored Men in March 1866.

In the summer of 1866, he founded a school for black students of all ages in Bastrop, Texas.

A Republican, he served as a Representative in the 12th Legislature, for Fayette County, Texas and Bastrop County from February 9, 1870, to January 14, 1873.

In 1871, he built the triangular Hamilton House at Symphony Square Red River, an extant building in Austin Symphony Orchestra's Symphony Square on the banks of Waller Creek.

== See also ==
- African American officeholders from the end of the Civil War until before 1900
