= Waller Creek =

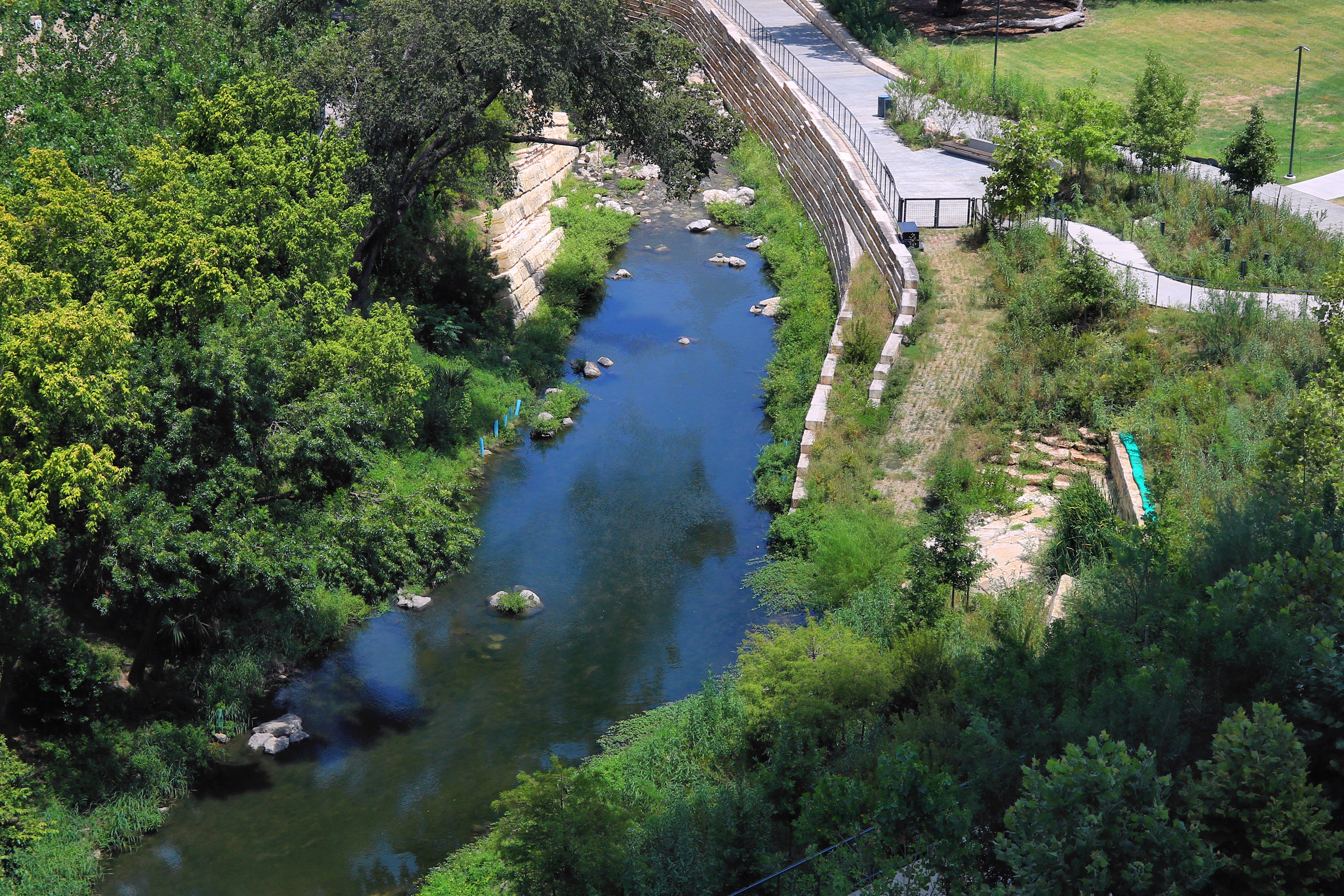
- Waller Creek at Sir Swante Palm Neighborhood Park

Location
- Country: United States

Physical characteristics
- Mouth: Lady Bird Lake
  - location: Austin, Texas
  - coordinates: 30°15′34″N 97°44′30″W
- Length: 7 mi (11 km)
- Basin size: 6 sq mi (16 km^{2})

Waller Creek is a stream and an urban watershed in Austin, Texas, United States. Named after Edwin Waller, the first mayor of Austin, it has its headwaters near Highland Mall and runs in a southerly direction, through the Commodore Perry Estate, the University of Texas at Austin and the eastern part of downtown Austin, including the Red River Cultural District, to its end at Lady Bird Lake.

Hemphill Creek merges with Waller Creek just south of Dean Keeton St.

A March 2024 article in Nature suggested that up to 90% of the waterflow in Waller Creek is due to leaky pipes and irrigation runoff.

== Historical Route ==
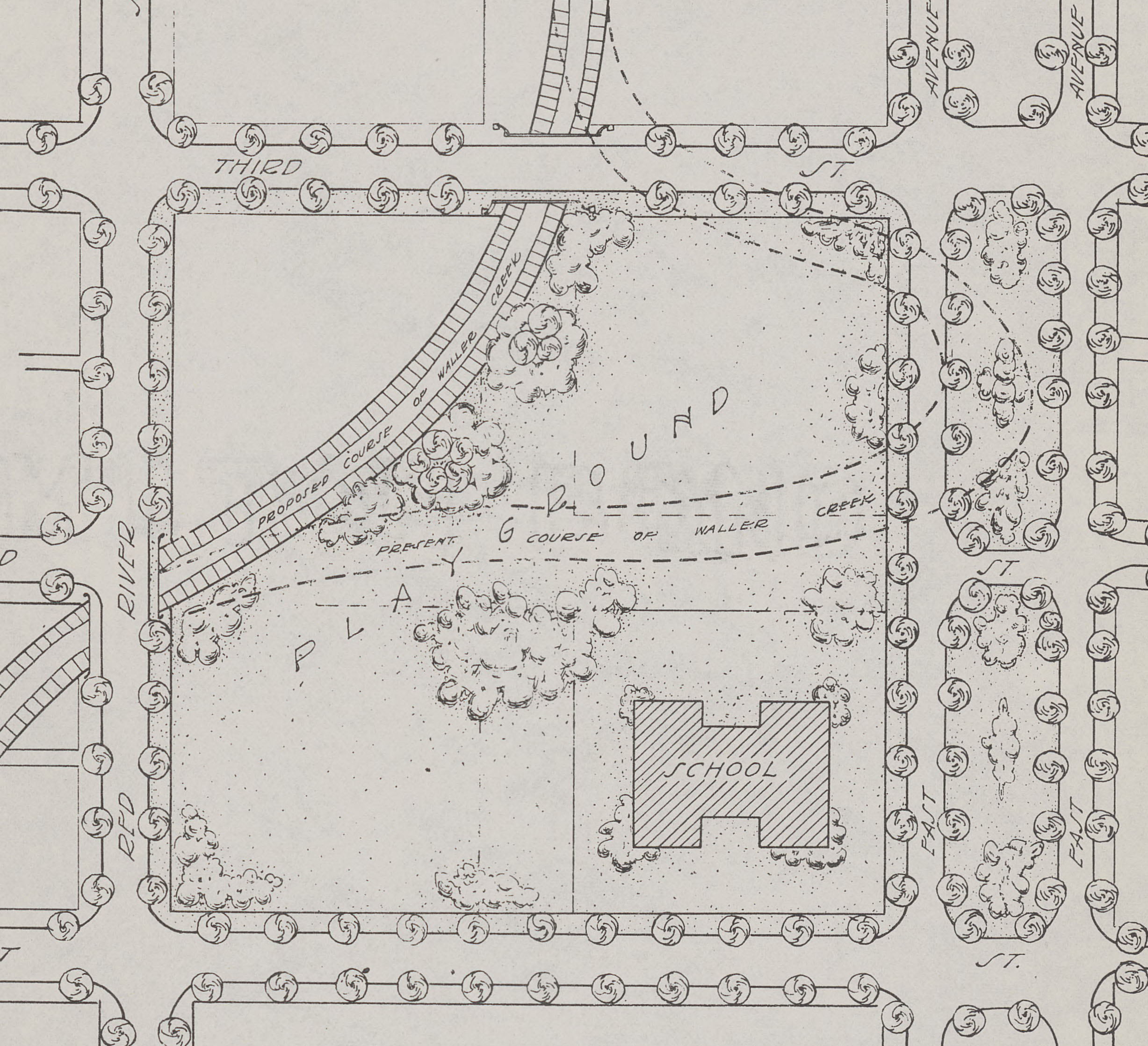
Waller Creek's pre and post-1929 routes superimposed on one another in an excerpt from the 1928 Austin city plan

Prior to 1929, the route of Waller Creek had a bulge in it, between second and third streets, that extended to present day IH35. This bulge can be seen going around Block 12 in the 1839 Waller Plan and on page 89 of the 1928 Austin city plan.

In 1929 the creek was rerouted to its present route to allow for the creation of what is now known as Palm Park, one block east of the present day Austin Convention Center. Palm Park, in turn, was named after the nearby Palm School, which was a city run elementary school that operated from 1887 to 1976 and, in fact, was the largest elementary school in Austin in 1928.

== Waterloo Park ==
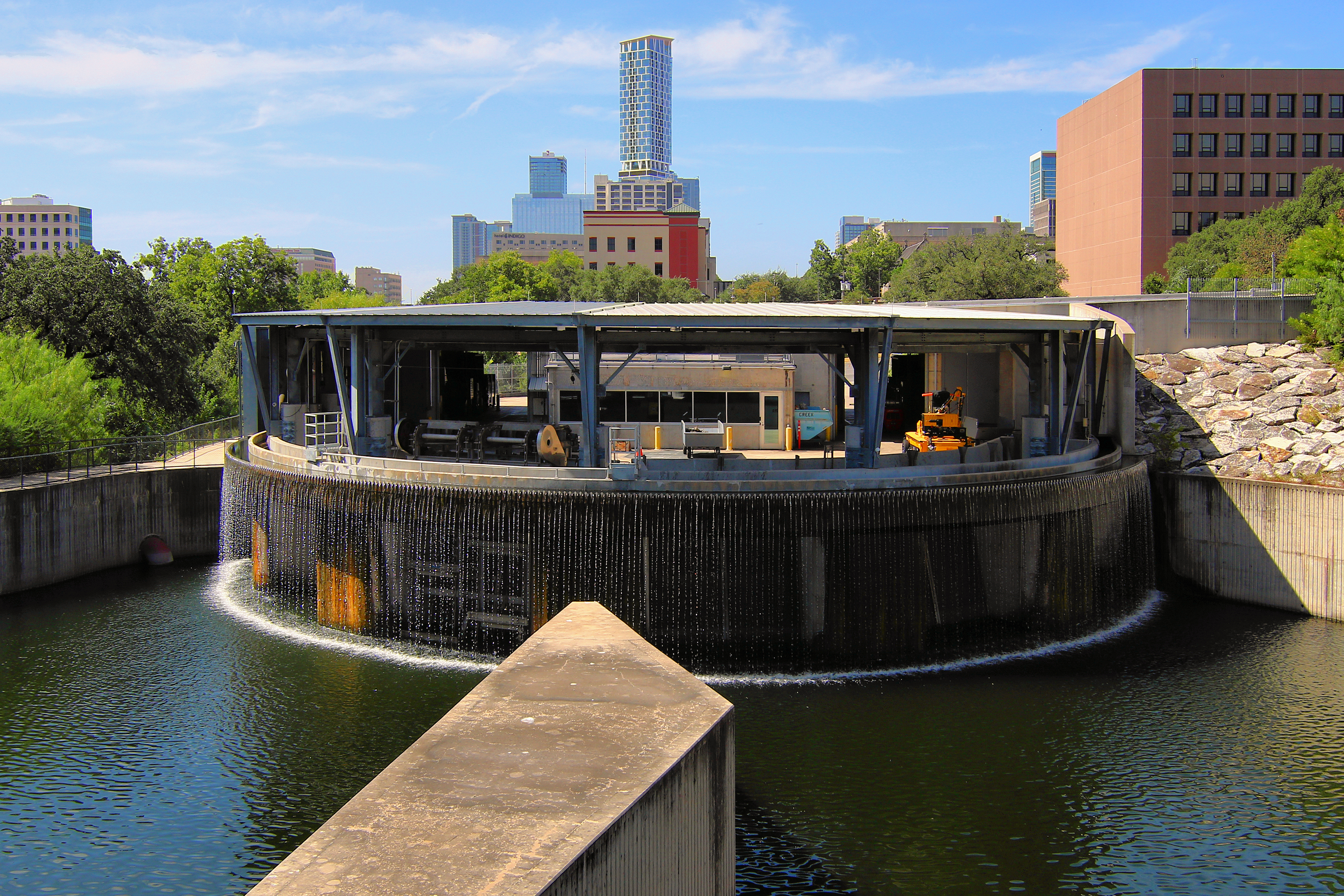
The Waller Creek Tunnel inlet facility in Waterloo Park diverts floodwaters into an underground tunnel to prevent flash flooding. The Waterline tower is in the background.

In 1975, 11 acres (4.5 ha) of a tract of land set aside for the expansion of Brackenridge Hospital became Waterloo Park.

In 1998, City of Austin voters approved of a $25 million bond package to build a mile long stormwater drainage tunnel from Waterloo Park to Lady Bird Lake along the route of Waller Creek. Construction commenced in 2011 and resulted in the closure of Waterloo Park. Construction on the Waller Creek Tunnel ended in 2018, however, what was supposed to be $25 million ballooned to $161 million. Alleging missing rebar and the use of poor quality concrete that wouldn't stand up to unusually large floods the City of Austin then sought $22.3 million from the tunnels developer. The tunnel, itself, has a diameter that varies between 22.5 and 26.5 ft (6.86 and 8.08 m)

Waterloo Park remained closed for an additional three years before finally re-opening in 2021, after having been closed for ten years. A third of the re-imagined park contains the Moody Amphitheater, an event space that can accommodate up to 5,000 people, that was designed by Thomas Phifer. Other new features include an elevated "skywalk", a playground and a garden.

Prior to Waterloo Park's 2011 closure, it had hosted events like Fun Fun Fun Fest and Spamarama.

Since Waterloo Park's re-opening, Moody Amphitheater has seen performances from artists such as Gary Clark Jr., Glass Animals, Counting Crows and Olivia Rodrigo, to name a few.

Funding for Waterloo Park's re-construction comes, in part, from the 501c3 non-profit, Waterloo Greenway Conservancy, which was founded in 2010 to revitalize Waller Creek.

In 2017, the Waterloo Greenway Conservancy, then known as the Waller Creek Conservancy, received a $15 million donation from the Moody Foundation. The Waller Creek Conservancy rebranded itself as the Waterloo Greenway Conservancy in August 2019.

Since 2014, the Waterloo Greenway Conservancy has held an annual fundraiser known called the Creek Show in November that features artwork by local artists.

Waterloo Park is two blocks north of a parcel of land that was intended to be one of four city parks in the original 1839 Waller Plan. The plan called for parks to be located in the northeast, northwest, southwest and southwest corners of the city and three of those parks still exist: Wooldridge Park (northwest), Republic Square (southwest) and Brush Square Park (southeast). What would have been the northeast park wound up becoming the home of the First Baptist Church of Austin.

== Symphony Square ==
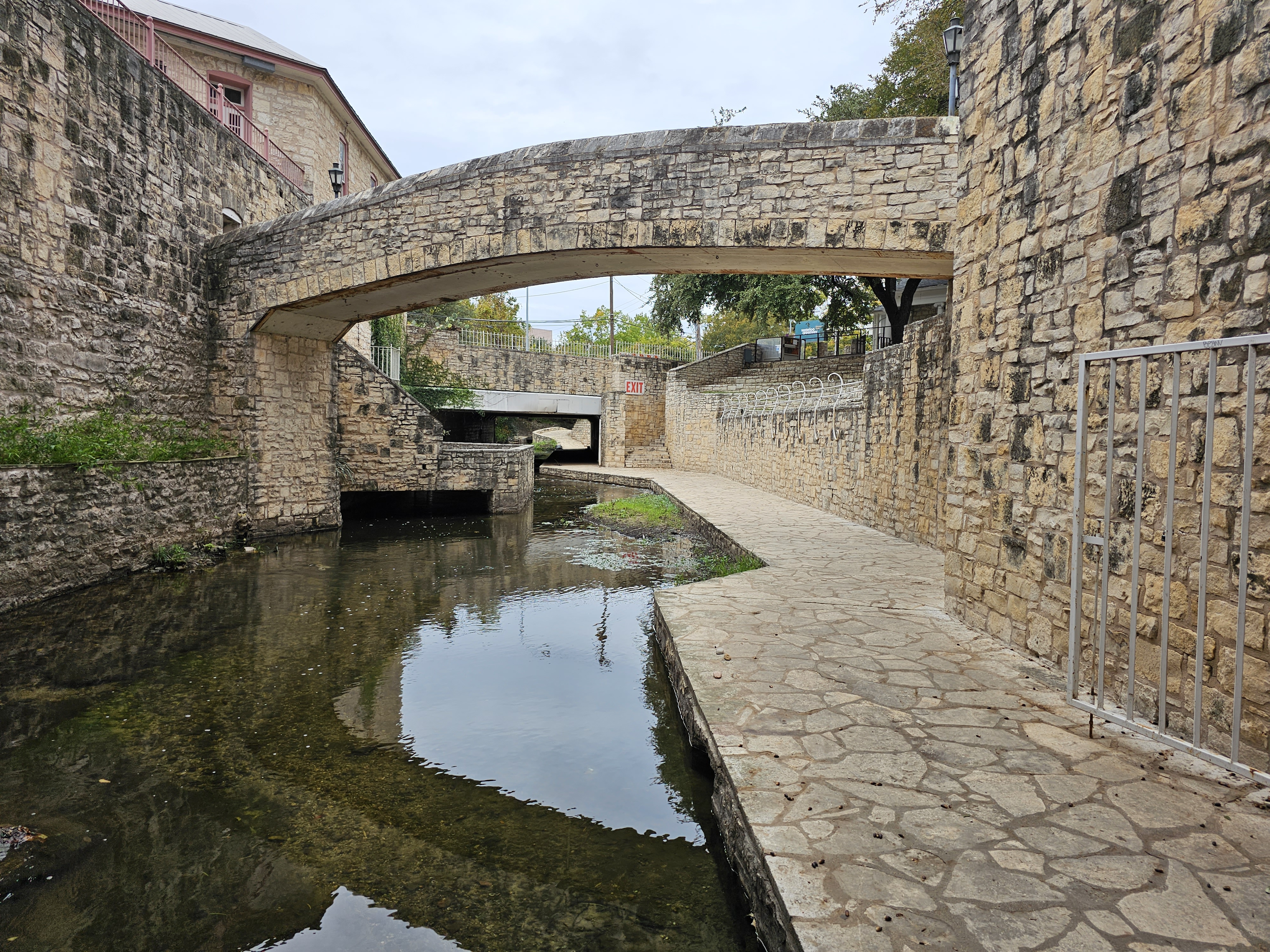
Waller Creek at Symphony Square

In 1974 the Austin Symphony Orchestra entered into a 50-year lease for a block of land between 11th and 12th streets, through which Waller Creek flows, that would later become known as Symphony Square. Although this block of land already contained at least one historic house, namely that of Jeremiah J. Hamilton, a slave turned Texas legislator, several other historic buildings were relocated to Symphony Square. In January 2017, the lease was split between the Austin Symphony Orchestra and the Waterloo Greenway Conservancy.

In 2021, a portion of Symphony Square saw the commencement of a construction project for a 33-story residential tower called The Waller.

Historic buildings in Symphony Square include:

=== William P. Hardeman House ===
Originally located at 16th and Trinity, William Polk Hardeman's homestead was built in the 1850s. The building housed Cadillac Bar from 1989 to 1992 and Serrano's from 1992 to 2015. Today, the building hosts the Waterloo Greenway Conservancy offices.

=== Jeremiah Hamilton Residence ===
Built in 1871, when Jeremiah J. Hamilton lived in this house the first floor was a grocery store and the second floor contained his residence. The building would later be a saloon and a barber shop before becoming the headquarters of the Austin Symphony.

A March 12, 1972 Austin American-Statesman article described the home as being "one of only three known triangular buildings in Texas".

=== New Orleans Mercantile Club ===
Built in the late 1870s at 1123–1125 Red River Street as a residence and grocery store for coal dealer Charles J. Wilson, the building hosted a music venue known as the New Orleans Mercantile Club in the 1950s. Ernie Mae Miller, grand daughter of L. C. Anderson and Austin Music Hall of Fame inductee, had a multi year residency at the New Orleans Mercantile Club. Until 2015 the building hosted Serrano's party room and now serves as a rentable event venue.

== 1969 Student Protest ==
In 1969, to make way for the expansion of the Darrell K Royal–Texas Memorial Stadium, a portion of San Jacinto Boulevard needed to be moved 65 feet to the west, which necessitated the destruction of 39 live oak trees. Upon learning of these plans 50 sign-carrying students from the University of Texas at Austin led a protest, blocking crews from commencing work through the use of tree sitting, among other things. On October 22, 1969, an editorial published in The Daily Texan included a petition slip that could be cut out and signed, which resulted in many more University of Texas students voicing their objections. Campus police were then mobilized, the protestors were forcibly removed, 27 were arrested, and the destruction of the trees commenced. The protest took place at a bend in San Jacinto Boulevard that was sarcastically dubbed “Erwin’s Bend,” after Board of Regents chair Frank Erwin.

== Waterline and The Confluence ==
In 2022, construction began on a 74-story, 1,022 ft (312 m) tall mixed-use tower called Waterline, which, upon completion, in August 2026, became the tallest building in Texas. This building is being built on the banks of Waller Creek, south of Cesar Chavez St.

Directly behind Waterline is The Confluence, a 13-acre park designed by Michael Van Valkenburgh Associates, that features an 800-foot boardwalk, three lattice bridges, public gathering spaces (Lagoon Overlook and Leaf Deck), shaded areas (Lakeview Terrace and Explorers Garden), 200,000 new plants and 1,600 new trees. Construction began in May 2023 and the park held its grand opening on Saturday, June 6, 2026.

Spearheaded by the Waterloo Greenway Conservancy, construction costs totaled $91 million, $12 million of which came from the United States Army Corps of Engineers.

== Homelessness ==
In the southern part of the Red River Cultural District, a block away from where East Seventh Street crosses Waller Creek (in an area the 1839 Austin city plan labeled Block 88), sits "[Austin's] homeless epicenter". A March 6, 1998 Austin American-Statesman article called the then burgeoning area a "homeless hub".

Some business owners have criticized the large numbers of unhoused people in the area.

=== History ===
The area first became associated with the homeless in 1985 when the Salvation Army purchased a portion of Block 88 in anticipation of building a homeless shelter. The Salvation Army had previously had a shelter located at 107 E. Second St from 1928 to 1980, however, that shelter was unable to keep up with the growing homeless population, so it was shuttered and sold, in December 1980, to fund the development of a 3.7 acre shelter next to St. Edward's University. Amid significant opposition, those plans were scrapped and a citizen task force was then created in 1985. It's purpose was to assist the Salvation Army in location a suitable location and it's that task force identified the location that was ultimately chosen. Other locations that had been considered and rejected due to opposition included a 5-acre plot of land in the Montopolis neighborhood and a 1-acre plot of land next to the Seaholm Power Plant. Even the location that was chosen was not without controversy, however, in spite of that, a new three-story $3.5 million 65,000 sqft homeless shelter opened in February 1988.

Caritas of Austin, which was founded in 1964 by Monsignor Richard McCabe, opened a 5,000 sqft facility across the street to provide meals, religious and educational services to the unhoused in 1991. That facility received a $2.5 million upgrade in 1999.

In August 1997 the Salvation Army bought an additional tract of land on Block 88. Less than a year later, in March 1998, then Austin mayor Kirk Watson announced a $12.3 million homeless plan which was to include a homeless shelter on the Salvation Army's newly acquired land. After negotiations to lease the property stalled, the City of Austin threatened to condemn the newly acquired property. The Salvation Army ultimately wound up selling the property to the City of Austin in February 2001. On April 28, 2004, the Austin Resource Center for the Homeless (ARCH for short) opened its doors. At the time of its opening, the new City of Austin owned facility had 100 beds and was 26,820 sqft. The building was additionally LEED Silver upon opening. By the time this building opened there were an estimated 4,000 unhoused people in Austin every night.

Front Steps managed the ARCH from 2004 to 2022. The City of Austin ended it's relationship with Front Steps in the wake of the COVID-19 pandemic. Urban Alchemy ran the shelter from 2022 to 2025. The City of Austin opted not to renew the contract with Urban Alchemy upon learning that they had been altering data and ultimately signed a new lease with Endeavor.

On February 17, 2023, the Salvation Army announced their intent to close and ultimately sell the property on which their shelter sat. "The facility is aging and in disrepair" The Salvation Army's website explained. In September 2023, the Salvation Army signed a one-year lease for the property with the City of Austin for $1.2 million to re-open the property for the duration of the lease. In October 2023, the Austin City Council voted to purchase the property for $15 million after the conclusion of the lease.

=== Impact ===
In 2001, Emo's owner Frank Hendrix sent a letter to the editor to the Austin American-Statesman in which he described "people defecating and urinating at Sixth Street and Red River during the day and passers-by being harassed by crack dealers, panhandlers and mentally disturbed hecklers".

In 2025, the Pecan Street Festival moved from Fifth Street to Bee Cave, Texas amidst "public safety concerns". "Homeless individuals sometimes approached vendors and made them feel uncomfortable" a KUT article wrote.

== Flooding ==
On the evening April 22, 1915, 10.29 inches of rain fell in downtown Austin causing Waller Creek and nearby Shoal Creek to flood, causing 40 deaths and an estimated US$2 million in damages ($60 million 2023 USD). Numerous bridges were washed out as were all of Austin's gravel highways. Some of the washed out bridges wouldn't be replaced for another 15 years.
