= Michael Millions =

American rapper

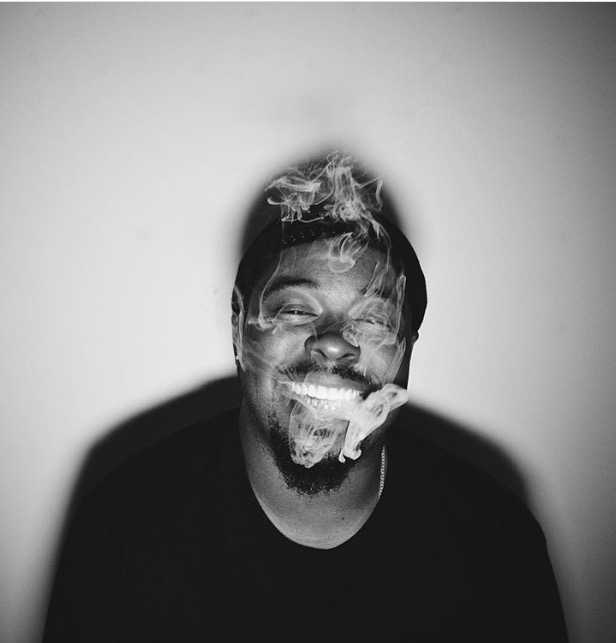
Michael Millions

Michael Bass, better known as his stage name Michael Millions, is two-time Grammy nominated American rapper, songwriter and engineer from Richmond, Virginia. He is the co-founder of Purple Republic Music Group and has collaborated with fellow Richmond natives Nickelus F and Skillz.

== Musical career ==
Michael started recording raps at the age of 14. By 18, he had signed a record deal with local independent label DonLand Entertainment. After recording hundreds of tracks in his time on the imprint, the company eventually folded before he could put out a proper release. In 2010, he dropped his debut project, the EP Ashes and Samples, produced entirely by his brother Brandon "NameBrand" Bass.

In 2011, Michael and Brandon pooled their funds together and started the independent label Purple Republic Music Group. The same year Michael put out his debut solo album The Color Purple. He would go on to put out two more projects in 2011, including the mixtape Loose Change and the EP Michael.

In 2014, he released the independent album Ghost of $20 Bills which features guest appearances from Nickelus F and Radio B. The LP garnered publicity from websites like The Source, 2DopeBoyz and The Stashed. Dessy Digital of The Source wrote about the project, "For over a year Millions has been putting in work, canvasing the local scene with his brash and introspective brand of music and giving the world a taste of what to expect with records like “Timb Boots”. With the necessary groundwork done, Millions presents what is sure to stand as a seminal piece of his musical discography as he looks to rise to national prominence."

The same year, he was featured in XXL's The Break section for up and coming artists.

Michael appeared on the 2014 Skillz song "Forever" off the "Rap Up" rapper's seventh solo album Made in Virginia with Bink. In an April 2016 interview with The Source, Skillz noted Millions was a rising Virginia artist to look out for.

In 2015, Michael put out the EP Beautiful along with a 17-minute short-film. Former 300 Entertainment staffers Uncle Arnold and Prophet Elijah named the Beautiful track "Fried Apples" the "Best Morning Song" of the year in The Fader's "Best of 2015" list.

In June 2016, Millions released the inspirational ode "Ali" just days after the passing of legendary boxer and activist Muhammad Ali. The song will serve as a single off his upcoming solo album which is slated to drop in fall or winter of 2016.

In 2024, Millions was nominated for a 2025 Grammy Award for Best Spoken Word Poetry Album for his work as the engineer on Mad Skillz's album The Seven Number Ones.

In November 2025, Millions earned a second Best Spoken Word Poetry Album Grammy nomination for engineering Skillz's LP, Words for Days Vol. 1.

== Discography ==
=== Independent Albums ===
- The Color Purple (2011)
- Ghost of $20 Bills (2014)

=== EPs ===
- Ashes and Samples (2010)
- Michael (2011)
- Beautiful (2015)
- Hard to be King (2018)

=== Mixtapes ===
- Loose Change (2011)

== Filmography ==
- Beautiful (short-film) directed by G of the Life Company (2015)
