= Oblivion Access Festival =

Annual music festival

- Genre: Hardcore punk; hip hop; metal; experimental
- Frequency: Annually
- Location: Austin, Texas
- Years active: 2017–present
- Inaugurated: March 16, 2017; 9 years ago
- Founders: Dusty Brooks; Dorian Domi
- Most recent: June 15–18, 2023
- Website: oblivionaccessfestival.com

Oblivion Access is an annual music festival held across multiple venues in the Red River Cultural District in Austin, Texas. With a focus on metal and experimental music, the festival is named for the Lil Ugly Mane album of the same name. It was founded in 2017 as Austin Terror Fest before changing its name in 2020.

== History ==
=== 2017-2019: Austin Terror Fest ===
Austin bookers Dusty Brooks and Dorian Domi hosted the inaugural Austin Terror Fest, a showcase of metal acts, during the 2017 South by Southwest festival. This first incarnation of the annual festival was conceived as an offshoot of Northwest and Southwest Terror Fest, which Brooks had previously worked to organize. The 2018 and 2019 Austin Terror Fest took place in June rather than during South by Southwest. By the third year, the festival lineup incorporated a more diverse range of genres.

=== 2022-present: Oblivion Access Festival ===
In January 2020, Brooks and Domi announced that their annual event had been renamed the Oblivion Access Festival. The first festival under the new name was scheduled for June 2020, but was postponed for two years due to the COVID-19 pandemic in Texas. In May 2022, the first Oblivion Access Festival took place across multiple venues in downtown Austin.

On March 28, 2024, festival organizers announced the cancelation of the year's edition of Oblivion Access, scheduled from June 13 to 16. The founders also canceled an Oxbow concert in Austin during November 2023 because of low ticket sales.

== Notable lineup by year ==
=== 2022 ===
The inaugural Oblivion Access festival took place between May 12-15, 2022.

- Acid Witch
- Andy Morin
- Andy Stott
- Anika
- A Place to Bury Strangers
- Armand Hammer (featuring The Alchemist)
- Author & Punisher
- Autopsy
- Billy Woods
- Black Dice
- Blonde Redhead
- Blood Incantation
- The Body
- Carcass
- Cave In
- Cities Aviv
- Converge
- Coven
- Danny Brown
- Deli Girls
- Despise You
- Drain
- Drew McDowall
- Fat Tony
- Full of Hell
- Fury
- Grouper
- Hell
- Ho99o9
- HTRK
- Injury Reserve
- King Woman
- Kool Keith
- Lil Ugly Mane
- Liturgy
- The Locust
- Massacre
- Melt-Banana
- Metz
- The Microphones
- Primitive Man
- Prurient
- Ringworm
- Show Me the Body
- Soul Glo
- Thou
- True Widow
- Uniform
- Vio-lence
- Wiki
- William Basinski
- Windhand
- Xiu Xiu
- Youth of Today
- Zola Jesus

=== 2023 ===
The second annual Oblivion Access festival took place between June 15-18, 2023.

- Beak
- Bing and Ruth
- Body of Light
- Bosse-de-Nage
- Chat Pile
- Choir Boy
- City of Caterpillar
- Clams Casino
- Clipping
- Cloud Rat
- Drab Majesty
- Drain
- Drew McDowall
- Drowse
- Drug Church
- Duster
- Earth
- Faust
- Final
- Gel
- Giles Corey
- Godflesh
- GothBoiClique
- Have a Nice Life
- Helm
- Jarboe
- Jeromes Dream
- Lil Ugly Mane
- Ludicra
- Lucas Abela
- Mamaleek
- Magnitude
- Midwife
- MSPaint
- Narrow Head
- Pallbearer
- Planning for Burial
- Ragana
- Riki
- RXK Nephew
- Sissy Spacek
- Spirit of the Beehive
- Sprain
- SRSQ
- Street Sects
- Thou
- Tim Hecker
- TR/ST
- Yellow Swans
- Yob

=== 2024 ===
Set to take place between June 13-16, the 2024 Oblivion Access Festival was cancelled that March.
