= Red River Cultural District (Austin, Texas) =

Coordinates: 30°16′6″N 97°44′11″W

District map

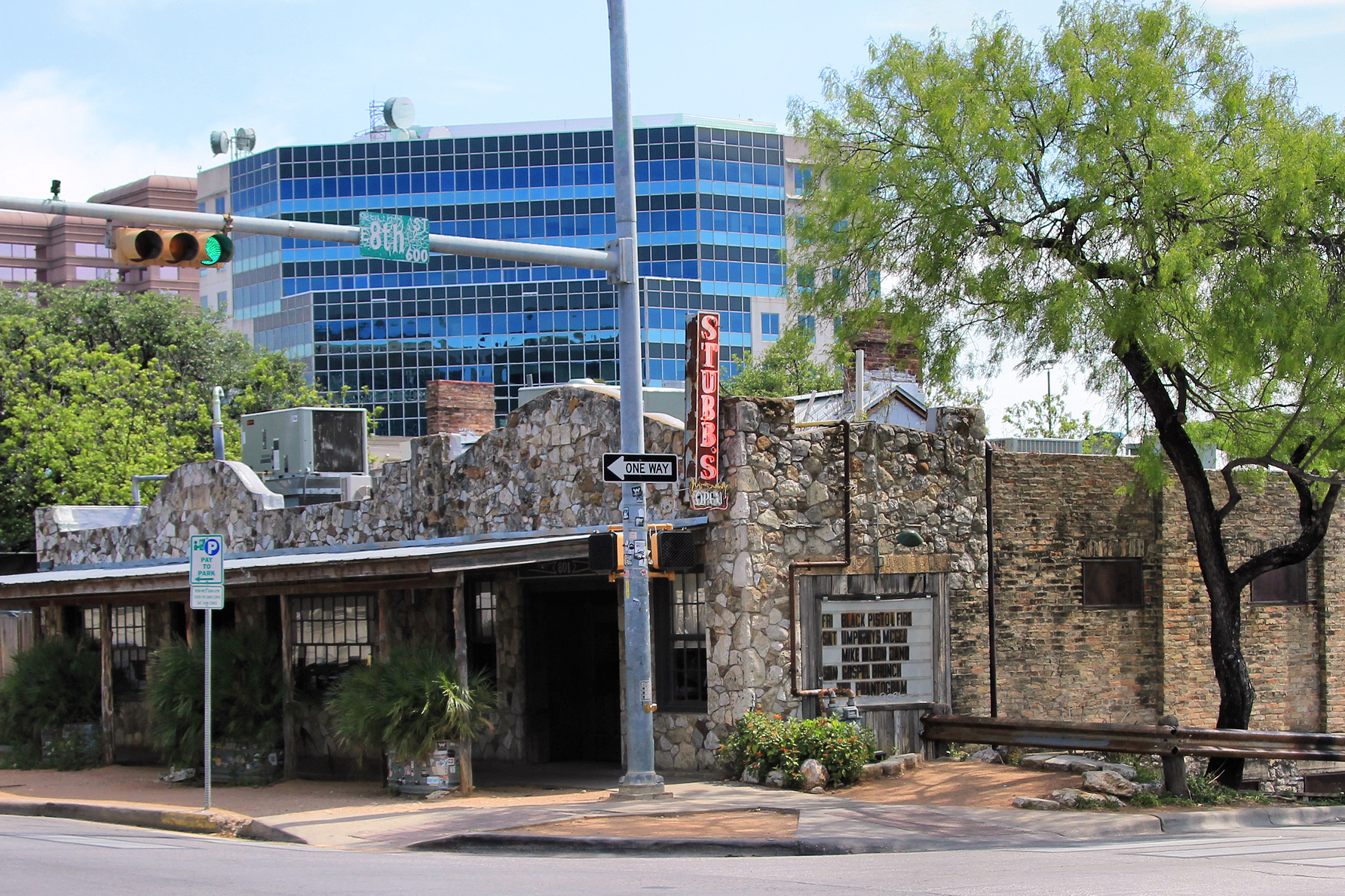
Stubb's Bar-B-Q is one of the many popular nightclubs in the Red River Cultural District.

The Red River Cultural District is an entertainment district in Downtown Austin, Texas, United States. The district runs along the 600–900 blocks of Red River Street.

Stubb's, Beerland Mohawk, Red Eyed Fly, Elysium, Barbarella, Metal and Lace, Swan Dive and Plush and other nearby nightclubs on adjacent streets are included in the district. The cultural district designation lets owners in the district market their venues together as a unique cultural asset of Austin. Stakeholders are also hoping the designation will curb rising land prices and redevelopment in the area.

Waller Creek flows through the length of the Red River Cultural District.

== History ==
=== Formation ===
The Austin City Council approved a resolution creating the district on October 17, 2013. The resolution also directs the City Manager to address parking and loading and unloading issues in the area and to investigate the state process used to designate an area as a cultural district with the Texas Commission for the Arts.

=== 2014 SXSW crash ===
The venues in the District participate heavily in the South by Southwest Music Festival. Red River Street is barricaded by Austin Police so that festival goers can safely get from club to club, and the crowds fill the street. On March 13, 2014 about 12:30 a.m., a suspected drunk driver, Rashad Owens, trying to evade police drove through the barricades at 9th Street and Red River and plowed into the crowd enjoying the festival. Four people were killed and 23 were injured. Owens ran into a van and was captured by police. Owens was found guilty of capital murder and sentenced to life in prison without the possibility of parole.

== Annual activities ==
Venues in the district host activities associated with many of Austin’s music festivals including South by Southwest, Levitation, Oblivion Access Festival, and after-shows for Austin City Limits Music Festival. Additionally, the district itself organizes two annual events involving performances with no cover charge: Free Week in January and Hot Summer Nights in July.

The district partners with SIMS Foundation, a local nonprofit aiming to improve access to mental health resources and reduce overdoses among Austin musicians, and the Travis County District Attorney’s office to organize a concert series called Safer Together: Overdose Prevention and Harm Reduction Saves Lives.

== Red River Cultural District Merchants Association ==
The Red River Cultural District Merchants Association formed in February 2016 with the purpose of engaging stakeholders and government officials to focus on improving the district’s conditions to create a more pedestrian friendly experience that attracts patrons. The associations boundaries run from the 600 block to the 1200 block of Red River. Businesses and organizations participating in the development and activities of the Red River Merchants Association include Mohawk Austin, Cheer Up Charlies, the German Texan Heritage Society, The Beverly, Stubb’s, Empire, Barracuda, Hoboken Pie, Beerland, Elysium, Koriente, Waller Creek Pub, The Sidewinder, Swan Dive, Twin Liquors and others.
