= God of Black =

EP by SpaceGhostPurrp
- Released: February 3, 2012
- Recorded: 2011–2012
- Genre: Hip-hop
- Length: 41:15
- Producers: Lil Ugly Mane; Poshgod; SpaceGhostPurrp

SpaceGhostPurrp chronology
Blackland Radio 66.6 (2011)	God of Black (2012)	Mysterious Phonk: Chronicles of SpaceGhostPurrp (2012)

God of Black, stylized as GXX XX BXXXK Volume. 1, is the second extended play (EP) by the American hip-hop musician SpaceGhostPurrp. It was released for free on February 3, 2012, months before his debut album, Mysterious Phonk: Chronicles of SpaceGhostPurrp.

== Critical reception ==
Shortly after the mixtape's release, British music magazine Fact gave God of Black a 3.5 out of 5 rating, stating, "God Of Black Purrrp does things by himself, for himself, with mixed results."

As 2012 concluded, Fact rated God of Black its fifth best album in its The 50 Best Albums of 2012 article, stating:

"Yes, plenty of the material from God of Black was cleaned up and re-released by 4AD this summer – in an absolutely beautiful package, we should add – but we’d still rather listen to February’s grottier, grittier God of Black given the choice. A serious step-up from past mixtape Blvcklvnd Rvdix 66.6, God of Black marks the point where Spaceghostpurrp shed (most of) his skin as a Three 6 Mafia tribute act and established himself as one of hip-hop’s most intriguing new voices."

== Track listing ==
All tracks are produced by SpaceGhostPurrp, except "Twistin'", produced by Lil Ugly Mane and "Mink Rug", produced by Poshgod.

No.	Title	Length
1.	"Low MF Key" (performed by Amber London)	4:10
2.	"Tha Black God"	3:10
3.	"Mystical Maze"	3:56
4.	"Elevate"	4:07
5.	"Twistin'" (performed by Klan Raven and Lil Ugly Mane)	4:21
6.	"Raider Prayer"	3:56
7.	"Suck a Dick 2012 After Party"	4:34
8.	"Black Diamonds Pearls"	3:34
9.	"Don't Give a Damn"	2:23
10.	"Mink Rug" (with Metro Zu)	3:23
11.	"Money Power Respect (Free B.G.)"	3:42
Total length:		41:15
