= Mysterious Phonk: Chronicles of SpaceGhostPurrp =

2012 studio album by SpaceGhostPurrp

Studio album by SpaceGhostPurrp
- Released: June 12, 2012
- Recorded: 2012
- Studio: Raider Klan
- Genres: Hip-hop; phonk
- Length: 57:55
- Label: 4AD
- Producer: SpaceGhostPurrp

SpaceGhostPurrp chronology
| God of Black (2012) | Mysterious Phonk: Chronicles of SpaceGhostPurrp (2012) | B.M.W. (2012) |

Instrumental release
- Mysterious Phonk: Chronicles of SpaceGhostPurrp (Instrumental Version)

Mysterious Phonk: Chronicles of SpaceGhostPurrp is the debut studio album by American hip-hop musician SpaceGhostPurrp. It was released by 4AD on June 12, 2012.

== Critical reception ==
Professional ratings
Aggregate scores
| Source | Rating |
|---|---|
| Metacritic | 69/100 |
Review scores
| Source | Rating |
| AllMusic | 3.5/5 stars |
| BBC | mixed |
| Consequence of Sound | C− |
| HipHopDX | 4/5 stars |
| NME | 7/10 |
| Pitchfork | 8.0/10 |
| PopMatters | 7/10 stars |
| Spin | 5/10 |

At Metacritic, which assigns a weighted average score out of 100 to reviews from mainstream critics, the album received an average score of 69% based on 20 reviews, indicating "generally favorable reviews".

Ian Cohen of Pitchfork gave the album an 8.0 out of 10, saying, "even if these tracks aren't familiar to you from previous mixtapes, each asserts itself largely with same qualities that have defined 4AD's roster since the beginning: mesmerizing use of reverb and negative space, hooks derived from the phonetic and rhythmic qualities of words rather than their meaning, constructions of alternate realities".

== Track listing ==
All tracks are written and produced by SpaceGhostPurrp.

| No. | Title | Length |
|---|---|---|
| 1. | "Mystikal Maze" | 4:12 |
| 2. | "Bringing the Phonk" | 3:11 |
| 3. | "Osiris of the East" | 3:24 |
| 4. | "Suck a Dick 2012" | 4:50 |
| 5. | "Get Yah Head Bust" | 3:11 |
| 6. | "Been Fweago" | 3:45 |
| 7. | "Grind on Me" | 2:17 |
| 8. | "The Black God" | 3:34 |
| 9. | "No Evidence" | 7:04 |
| 10. | "Paranoid" | 4:17 |
| 11. | "Danger" | 5:19 |
| 12. | "Elevate" | 4:07 |
| 13. | "Don't Give a Damn" | 2:56 |
| 14. | "Raider Prayer" | 4:39 |
| Total length: | | 57:55 |

iTunes Store bonus track
| No. | Title | Length |
|---|---|---|
| 15. | "Lustful 97" | 6:22 |
| Total length: | | 64:24 |

== Charts ==
| Chart | Peak position |
|---|---|
| US Heatseekers Albums (Billboard) | 38 |
