= The Weeping Worm =

2014 EP by Lil Ugly Mane

EP by Lil Ugly Mane
- Released: October 26, 2014
- Genre: Experimental hip-hop; Memphis rap; horrorcore
- Length: 26:14 (29:39 with "Underwater Tank")
- Label: Self-released
- Producer: Sean Cemp; Shawn Kemp (On "Days Like This")

Lil Ugly Mane chronology
Absence of Shitperson (2014)	The Weeping Worm (2014)	Third Side of Tape (2015)

The Weeping Worm is the fourth extended play by American rapper Lil Ugly Mane. It was self-released via Bandcamp on October 26, 2014. Guest appearances include DJ Dog Dick and Nickelus F. The EP also contains a video for "End Your Whole Shit".

== Release ==
The Weeping Worm was released on Lil Ugly Mane's Bandcamp on October 26, 2014, for $3. It wasn't released on any other streaming platform, although the tracks "Passion Sceptre/Dert Mysery" and "Hideous Disfigurements" were later included in the compilation album "Songs That People Emailed Me About Asking Why I Hadn't Put Them on Streaming Platforms", which was released on multiple streaming platforms in 2019.

Slowed down version of the track "Nickelus F-Days Like This" was also later included in the album "Trick Dice" in track "SIDE A" by Nickelus F and Shawn Kemp, but it is released under the name "LUCID SLOWED".

The track "Passion Sceptre/Dert Mysery" was previously included on vinyl along with "On Doing An Evil Deed Blues" in 2014.

== "Underwater Tank" ==
The Weeping Worm originally contained six songs, including "Underwater Tank" featuring Antwon. This song was, however, removed from Bandcamp sometime between April 2017 and March 2019. This was most probably due to allegations against Antwon in 2018.

== Reception ==
Etan Khanal from student-run music magazine "The B-Side" gave the EP a positive review stating: "This EP couldn't have come out at a better time. A darker, more vile Lil' Ugly Mane release is the perfect soundtrack to a late-night lurking through the streets."

== Track listing ==
No.	Title	Writer(s)	Length
1.	"Lights Down Low" (featuring DJ Dog Dick)	Travis Miller; Max Eisenberg	4:00
2.	"Passion Sceptre/Dert Mystery"	Miller	9:05
3.	"Hideous Disfigurements"	Miller	5:38
4.	"Days Like This" (performed by Nickelus F)	Miller; Daniel W. Jones	3:53
5.	"Hello"		0:02
Total length:			26:14

Notes

- "Passion Sceptre/Dert Mystery" contains a sample of "Recognize N Realize" by Cella Dwellas, "Drugs" by Kool Keith, "Who in the Fuck" by MC Ren, and "Staring Through My Rearview" by 2Pac.
- All tracks are stylized in all caps on Bandcamp. For example, "Hideous Disfigurements" is stylized as "HIDEOUS DISFIGUREMENTS" on Bandcamp.
