= Lil Ugly Mane =

American musician and record producer (born 1984)

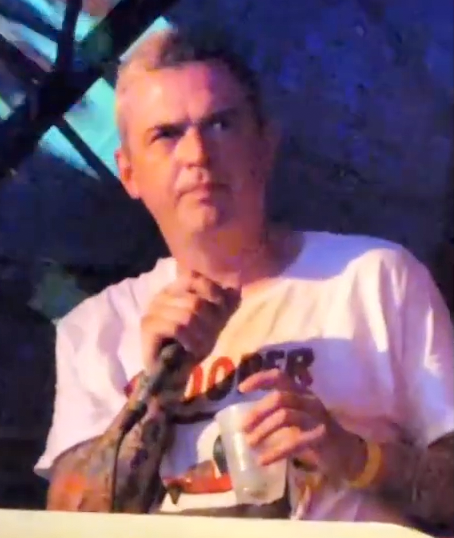
- Miller performing in 2022

Background information
- Also known as: Shawn Kemp; Bedwetter; Vudmurk; other
- Born: Travis Miller; May 13, 1984 (age 42)
- Origin: Richmond, Virginia, U.S.
- Genres: Experimental; southern hip-hop; horrorcore; lo-fi; noise; indie rock; punk rock; black metal
- Occupations: Rapper; singer; songwriter; record producer; graphic designer
- Works: Lil Ugly Mane discography
- Years active: c. 1999–present
- Formerly of: Secret Circle

Travis Miller (born May 13, 1984), best known professionally as Lil Ugly Mane, is an American musician, rapper, singer, and record producer. Noted for his diverse style, introspective lyrics, and various side projects, Miller's work spans a wide range of genres, including experimental hip-hop, black metal, lo-fi music, indie rock, and free jazz. He has also produced under the alias Shawn Kemp, and has recorded under the names Bedwetter, Vudmurk and several others.

Miller began his performing career in the 2000s in the noise and punk circles of Richmond, Virginia, though his published work includes pieces from as early as 1999. He first gained wider recognition in the early 2010s through his work with Florida hip-hop collective Raider Klan and his debut album Mista Thug Isolation in 2012. Mista Thug Isolation drew influence from East Coast hip-hop, Memphis rap, horrorcore, and chopped and screwed music, and has since been hailed as a pivotal work in the underground hip-hop scene.

Following a brief retirement beginning in 2013, he released his second album Oblivion Access in 2015. From 2016 to 2018, Miller was a member of the underground rap supergroup Secret Circle with rappers Wiki and Antwon. In 2017, he released the album Volume 1: Flick Your Tongue Against Your Teeth and Describe the Present as Bedwetter. Miller released the third Lil Ugly Mane album, Volcanic Bird Enemy and the Voiced Concern, in 2021.

== Life and career ==
Travis Miller was born on May 13, 1984. Little is known about Miller's personal life. He rarely grants interviews and has openly expressed his disinterest in maintaining a physical presence. He is originally from Virginia, having lived in Virginia Beach and Richmond. Miller's early musical interest came up in the hardcore punk music scene where he attended shows and collected albums. In a 2024 interview with comedians Brandon Wardell and Jamel Johnson, Miller said that he had previously lived in Philadelphia, Baltimore, and Los Angeles. As of 2024, Miller lives in Asheville, North Carolina.

=== 2000s–2014: Beginnings and Mista Thug Isolation ===
Miller began performing in the mid-to-late 2000s, playing with local noise and punk acts in Richmond. He started recording Southern hip-hop-inspired tracks as Lil Ugly Mane in 2010, initially only releasing demos and remixes on the music distribution platform Bandcamp before releasing his first full-length project, Playaz Circle: Pre-Meditation (The First Prophecy) Preview Mixtape (Real Murder Posse Underground Version), in 2011. During this period, he collaborated with Florida hip-hop collective Raider Klan, designing the group's album art and appearing on the song "My Hood" from group founder SpaceGhostPurrp's 2011 mixtape Blackland Radio 66.6. In January 2012, Miller released the EP Criminal Hypnosis: Unreleased Shit, featuring cut tracks from Playaz Circle.

"Cup Fulla Beetlejuice"
A sample of the song "Cup Fulla Beetlejuice" from Miller's album Mista Thug Isolation (2012). Pitchfork's Andy O'Connor described it as "classic Three 6 production mixed with goofy Halloween ghost sounds".

On February 11, 2012, Miller released his first studio album, Mista Thug Isolation, exclusively on Bandcamp. The album was produced by Miller under the alias Shawn Kemp, and contains a feature from rapper and Raider Klan member Denzel Curry on the song "Twistin". It received a limited cassette release through the record label Ormolycka, and a vinyl pressing through Hundebiss Records. Despite a lack of promotion by Miller, the album gained attention primarily through word-of-mouth marketing, and was praised by Odd Future members Earl Sweatshirt and Tyler, the Creator. The album's sound has been described by music writers as being influenced by East Coast hip-hop, Memphis rap, horrorcore, and chopped and screwed music, and has drawn comparisons to the works of Three 6 Mafia, Gravediggaz, Smif-N-Wessun, DJ Screw, and Wu-Tang Clan. Mista Thug Isolation has since been acclaimed as a landmark and a classic in underground hip-hop; in a retrospective review for Pitchfork, Andy O'Connor called it "one of the decade's most defining underground rap albums".

Mista Thug Isolation was followed by a number of smaller releases, including the EP Uneven Compromise in October 2012 and two volumes of the mixtape Three Sided Tape, consisting of unreleased songs and instrumentals that were recovered from Miller's broken computer, in August 2013. On August 30, 2013, Miller released the single "On Doing an Evil Deed Blues", in which he outlined his grievances with the music industry and his intention to retire the Lil Ugly Mane project. After the release of the single, Miller labeled Lil Ugly Mane as "defunct" on his Bandcamp page, and largely withdrew from the public eye. He infrequently returned to upload new music, including the 18-track mixtape Absence Of Shitperson and the EP The Weeping Worm in 2014, but remained quiet on social media.

=== 2015–2018: Oblivion Access, Secret Circle, and Bedwetter ===
On April 29, 2015, Miller released Third Side of Tape, the third and final volume of the Three Sided Tape series, featuring a compilation of tracks recorded from 1999 to 2012. In a statement made alongside its release, Miller announced that a physical box set of the trilogy would be distributed and suggested that his listeners "shouldn't be so Stratfordian". The liner notes of Third Side of Tape implied that it would be Miller's penultimate project. In September 2015, Miller and fellow Richmond rapper Nickelus F released a collaborative mixtape titled Trick Dice.

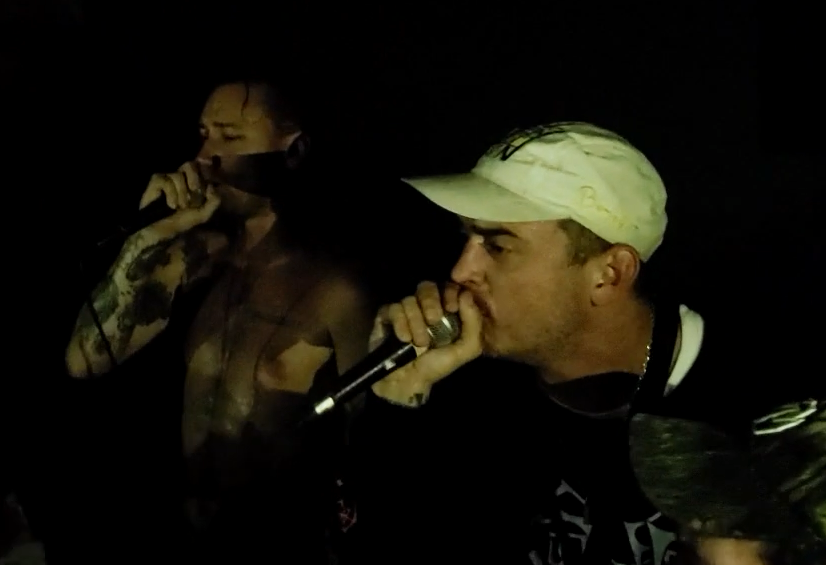
Miller (right) performing in August 2018

Miller's second album Oblivion Access was released on December 18, 2015; he described the project as "the last of the filthy water funneling out of the bathtub I've been soaking in for 5 years". An experimental hip-hop album, its lyrics were characterized by music publications as the darkest thus far in Miller's discography; they explore topics such as existentialism, boredom spurred by the Information Age, and the cycle of violence. Joe Sherwood of Tiny Mix Tapes appraised it as a "eschatological/scatological compendium of life and death in the rap game", and highlighted the stylistic contrast between the album and Mista Thug Isolation, commenting: "There's no self-serious reinvention to be found, and maybe that's the point — what started as a jokey pastiche of Memphis rap is coming to an ironic conclusion, even with the former veneer stripped away." Bandcamp Daily's Christina Lee described the album as "bleak" and noted feelings of claustrophobia, particularly on the track "Grave Within a Grave". Jots of Sputnikmusic called it "an album of dealing with... ugly, real baggage" and "a collage of Miller's capabilities, and a lament of what he is incapable of."

In 2016, Miller formed the underground hip-hop supergroup Secret Circle with rappers Wiki and Antwon, releasing their first track "Keep It Low" on June 8. The group released the single "Satellite" featuring the rapper Despot in early January 2017.

On January 29, 2017, Miller released his third album Volume 1: Flick Your Tongue Against Your Teeth and Describe the Present under the alias Bedwetter. The following day, he posted a statement on Facebook in which he recounted a three-month-long struggle with finding psychiatric care, eventually leading to his admittance and discharge from a hospital after asserting he was not suicidal or at risk of hurting others. In the same post, he criticized the American mental healthcare system as "absolute shit" and said that it had a "very real potential to turn people who voluntarily seek help ... into violent suicidal monsters".

After the release of the album, Miller continued working with Secret Circle, releasing the single "Tube Socks" in May 2017. In June, Miller made a guest appearance on the song "Zeltron 6 Billion" from Denzel Curry's EP 13. In July, Secret Circle followed up with the single "Tonka Truck", produced by Left Brain of Odd Future, and later released "Ounce Of It" in February 2018. In April 2018, Miller released a new project titled Thing S Thatare Stuff, a compilation of four tracks recorded from 2006 to 2011.

On May 17, 2018, Miller announced on his Instagram account that Secret Circle had disbanded and that all shows and an upcoming album were canceled. The following night, Antwon posted a statement on Twitter in which he addressed unspecified allegations, admitting to selfishly using his platform and mistreating women. In a subsequent post, Miller expressed regret for initially trying to protect Antwon and reacted to his statement: "This is all about the people you hurt. These aren't 'allegations' and 'accusations.' This is shit you did."

=== 2019–present: Volcanic Bird Enemy and the Voiced Concern ===
Miller greatly reduced his output from the latter half of 2018 through 2021. In a 2023 interview with Spin, he attributed the break to a need to discard creative ideas, likening the process to that of painter Francis Bacon:

[Bacon] was constantly trashed and fucking stabbed so many of his works with a knife. But he didn't stop painting, and he definitely didn't stop signing them 'Francis Bacon.' Sometimes you just need to ball it up and throw it away, but unfortunately I don't work in a tangible physical medium I can just trash, so I have to destroy the entire idea.

In April 2019, Miller and Wiki were featured on the track "Smores" from Your Old Droog's album It Wasn't Even Close. In June, Miller appeared on Culture Abuse's song "War Time Dub, Culture City". He appeared alongside Denzel Curry on the track "Grim" from Wiki's album Oofie in November. In 2021, he resumed publishing music on his Bandcamp page for the first time in over three years, releasing the singles "Headboard" and "Here I Am" on July 27, followed by two more singles, "Porcelain Slightly" and "Into A Life", on September 14. In early October, he released a black metal demo project titled Obedient Form under the name Vudmurk.

"Into a Life"
A sample of the song "Into a Life" from Miller's album Volcanic Bird Enemy and the Voiced Concern (2021). Similar to other songs on the album, it employs a lo-fi sound.

On October 12, 2021, Miller released Volcanic Bird Enemy and the Voiced Concern, the first Lil Ugly Mane project since 2015. In an interview with Jesse Taconelli of Rate Your Music, Miller said of the album:

It's Palace Music - Viva Last Blues meets Lucas with the lid off meets Self - Subliminal Plastic Motives meets Child & Magic by Nobukazu Takemura meets Grim - Message all channeled thru [sic] The Rentals - Return of The Rentals chained up on the set of Forbidden Zone being forced to play Garfield by Adam Green in its entirety.

Music writers noted the album's shift from Miller's hip-hop background to a lo-fi and indie rock sound, and likened it to the music of Beck, Eels, Sparklehorse, and The Folk Implosion. Tom Breihan of Stereogum called it an "unexpected and pretty-great take on Folk Implosion-style '90s breakbeat-slacker indie rock", while Patrick Lyons of Spin labeled it "something resembling a specific corner of '90s alternative music".

Miller appeared with Billy Woods on the single "Meteor Man" from Your Old Droog's album Space Bar in November 2021. In 2022, he released a number of singles, beginning with "Low Tide At The Dryin' Out Facility" on July 19. On September 12, he released the track "Blue Sand", along with two songs as Thermos Grenadine, "Christmas Cowboy" and "Poisoning Pigeons in the Park". In October, he released "Pink & Rose", "Easy Prey", and "Split Ends". On November 20, Miller released "Redacted Fog" and "Unassisted". On January 9, 2023, the single "Ricochet" was released. He released the tracks "Orange Over" and "Spill" on December 5.

== Artistry ==
Miller's discography covers a diverse array of genres. In an undated interview with Cult Classic, he described himself as "intersectional" and outlined his musical background: "I grew up punk. I got into jazz and through that I got into hip hop. Through hip hop I got into all sorts of shit because I was obsessed with the idea of sampling. I love sampling." His earliest works as Lil Ugly Mane were heavily inspired by Southern hip-hop, horrorcore, and East Coast hip-hop, while later projects have been described by writers as experimental hip-hop, free jazz, breakbeat, black metal, indie rock, and lo-fi music. His lyrics have been described as vulnerable and self-loathing. They have explored themes including braggadocio, existentialism, the cycle of violence, boredom, nihilism, addiction, and depression. According to Miller, his lyrics were written when he "was drunk, probably", and are simply what he thought "sounded cool".

Much of Miller's work incorporates cartoon imagery. Miller has cited L. Frank Baum, Carl Barks, Jim Henson, Pee-wee Herman, ShowBiz Pizza Place, Jean-Eugène Robert-Houdin, the Hamburglar, and Carl W. Stalling as inspirations for his aesthetic.

== Impact ==
Multiple artists have praised or cited Miller's work as an influence on their own. Denzel Curry said that Miller had inspired his decision to draw the cover art for his debut album Nostalgic 64 (2013). Billy Woods lauded Miller's production as Shawn Kemp in a 2015 interview with Tiny Mix Tapes. Earl Sweatshirt named "Throw Dem Gunz" from Mista Thug Isolation as one of his favorite songs in 2012. In a 2016 interview with Dazed, singer Lauren Auder called Miller "one of our generation's best rappers". Producer Gud called Miller his favorite artist and labeled him "the best [rapper] of them all." Rapper Scrim of hip-hop duo Suicideboys described the production on the track "O Pana!" from Eternal Grey (2016) as being influenced by Miller.

Miller's 2015 album Oblivion Access is the namesake of the Oblivion Access Festival in Austin, Texas. On May 12, 2022, he performed at the festival for the first time; the show featured sketches involving Miller and an animatronic dog named Thermos Grenadine. On June 16, 2023, Miller performed at Oblivion Access Festival for the second time.

== Selected discography ==
=== Studio albums ===
- Mista Thug Isolation (2012)
- Trick Dice (2015, as Shawn Kemp with Nickelus F)
- Oblivion Access (2015)
- Volume 1: Flick Your Tongue Against Your Teeth and Describe the Present. (2017, as Bedwetter)
- Volcanic Bird Enemy and the Voiced Concern (2021)

=== Mixtapes ===
- Playaz Circle: Pre Meditation (the First Prophecy) Preview Mixtape (Real Murder Posse Underground Version) (2011)
- Three Sided Tape Volume One (2013)
- Three Sided Tape Volume Two (2013)
- Absence of Shitperson (2014)
- Third Side of Tape (2015)

=== Extended plays/demos ===
- Criminal Hypnosis: Unreleased Shit (2012)
- Uneven Compromise (2012)
- The Weeping Worm (2014)
- Thing s Thatare Stuff (2018)
