= Three Sided Tape Volume One =

Mixtape by Lil Ugly Mane
- Released: August 7, 2013
- Genres: Experimental hip-hop; Memphis rap; instrumental hip-hop; jazz rap
- Length: 60:44 (Note: Bandcamp release); 64:08 (Note: Spotify release)
- Label: Self-released
- Producer: Lil Ugly Mane under multiple aliases (Note: Aliases differ from streaming platform and from track to track. these aliases are: Lil Ugly Mane, FAT GREG, SHAWN KEMP, SLUMPY D, DJ DEREK, TERRIBLE GRAVY, WILSON INC, TONE LARRY THA GAMEKEEPA, Broad Cranium)

Lil Ugly Mane chronology
Uneven Compromise (2012)	Three Sided Tape Volume One (2013)	Three Sided Tape Volume Two (2013)

Alternative cover
- Bandcamp cover

Three Sided Tape Volume One is a mixtape by American rapper Lil Ugly Mane. It was self-released via Bandcamp on 7 August 2013 on Bandcamp, and later on other streaming platforms. It is the first installment in the Three Sided Tape series, followed by Three Sided Tape Volume Two and Third Side of Tape.

== Track listing ==
Bandcamp Release
No.	Title	Writer(s)	Length
1.	"Side One"	Travis Miller	17:13
2.	"Side Two"	Miller, Ilwad Awale	24:48
3.	"Side Three"	Miller	18:43
Total length:			60:44

Spotify Release
No.	Title	Writer(s)	Length
1.	"Nasty Awful Rappers"	Travis Miller	0:41
2.	"Hello"	Miller	0:52
3.	"Steelspittin (Mp3codec Errorincluded)"	Miller	2:32
4.	"Bathtime"	Miller	1:10
5.	"Cap Peel"	Miller	2:12
6.	"Forever I B Stangin'"	Miller	3:42
7.	"Can Sex Me"	Miller	3:06
8.	"Iron Door"	Miller	2:17
9.	"Syko 4 Dat Ass"	Miller	0:43
10.	"Radio"	Miller	0:13
11.	"Radiation"	Miller	1:35
12.	"___________"	Miller	2:03
13.	"Bedtime"	Miller	0:58
14.	"Jesus Piece"	Miller	2:33
15.	"Ethics"	Miller	2:27
16.	"Found Tape"	Miller	1:22
17.	"Hennessy And Seagrams Gin"	Miller	1:12
18.	"Smokeclears"	Miller, Ilwad Awale	4:03
19.	"Brion Gyson With A Cool Hat On"	Miller	1:07
20.	"Deer Gas"	Miller	2:05
21.	"Vudmurk"	Miller	4:27
22.	"Cut"	Miller	0:58
23.	"Down"	Miller	3:08
24.	"Citynitesfox Blues"	Miller	1:23
25.	"Spaghetti Strap Gun Holster"	Miller	1:56
26.	"Rip"	Miller	0:30
27.	"Maniac"	Miller	2:19
28.	"Dream"	Miller	0:23
29.	"Longrange"	Miller	0:53
30.	"Old Person Controller"	Miller	3:17
31.	"Slack In My Mack"	Miller	3:51
32.	"Replica Fireplace"	Miller	3:57
Total length:			64:08
