= Nickelus F =

American rapper

- Also known as: Nick Fury; Sweet Petey
- Origin: Richmond, Virginia, U.S.
- Genre: Hip hop
- Occupations: Rapper; songwriter; producer
- Instruments: Vocals
- Years active: 2000–present
- Label: Authentic Music Group/Rayni Day Entertainment

Daniel W. Jones, known professionally as Nickelus F (formerly known as Nick Fury), is an American rapper from Richmond, Virginia. He is best known for his work with Canadian rapper Drake during his earlier career phases, having guest appeared on his debut mixtape Room for Improvement (2006) and its follow-up, Comeback Season (2007). Jones was 106 & Park's "Freestyle Friday" champion for seven consecutive weeks in 2007, and inducted into BET's Hall of Fame that same year.

== Music career ==
Jones first began rapping in the 4th grade while at summer camp but he did not begin to take rap seriously until he was in the 6th grade. His first official song was recorded over LL Cool J's song "Hey Lover."

In 2000, Nickelus F got his first break into the hip hop industry when he competed against 300 contenders in the regional "Source Unsigned Hype Emcee Battle" where he placed second despite having no formal recording experience. He was also named "Unsigned Hype" in The Source in 2000 at the age of 17.

Nickelus F then went on to participate in BET's 106 & Park Freestyle Fridays where he was crowned champion after winning seven weeks in a row in 2007.

In November 2009, Nickelus F was featured in Complex's "Ten Most Underrated New Rappers".

In 2015, Nickelus F collaborated with rapper/producer Lil Ugly Mane, under his production name Shawn Kemp, and released the album Trick Dice. This album was released on cassette and according to Nickelus F, sold out in one hour.

In 2016, Nickelus F made his return to battle rap in a league, "Southpaw Battle Coalition" against Danja Zone, and in 2017 against Bigjinya.

Nickelus F is currently part of a collective in Richmond, Virginia, known as the Association of Great Minds or AGM. It features fellow artists Radio B and Michael Millions, producer Namebrand, and photographer/videographer Monsee.

Drake has described Nickelus F as "one of the most gifted people I know at finding flows".

As of 2018, the last released collaboration between Drake and Nickelus F was in 2013, titled "Number 15," which was released as a bonus track fifteen on Nickelus F's "Vices" album.

=== Ghostwriting ===
In a 2010 interview with Complex Magazine, when asked if he had ever ghostwritten for Drake, Nickelus F responded "Yeah, I've done that. I know the rumor going around. I don't want anything I say to be misconstrued. I helped out, you know."

=== Influences ===
Nickelus F considers himself to be a "true student" of hip-hop and hip-hop culture. He cites Project Pat, Drake, Tha Dogg Pound, C-Bo, Spice 1, Lord Finesse, and high school friend J.R. The Great as a few of his hip-hop inspirations. However, he cites Kanye West, Jay Z, MF Doom, Raekwon, and Future as his top 5 rappers.

== Personal life ==
Born in Portland, Oregon, to a father who served in the military, Nickelus F moved frequently as a child. He spent time in his childhood living in Berlin, Germany and lived in various places across Virginia, United States including Hampton, Charlotte, West Virginia, and Richmond. While battle rapping on BET's 106 & Park Freestyle Fridays, Nickelus F was working as an exterminator for Terminex, a pest control service. He would head to New York from Richmond, Virginia after work on Thursdays to compete in Black Entertainment Television 106 & Park "Freestyle Friday" every week.

After the birth of his two twin daughters, Nickelus F began his undergraduate degree at the Virginia Commonwealth University in Richmond, Virginia. He credits school for making him more efficient with his time and music as it provided him with structure in his life. Nickelus F, with art director Daniel Green, has won several awards in the advertising industry, including the Gold Addy for Art Direction presented by the American Advertising Foundation.

In 2015, Richmond, Virginia street artist Nils Westergard painted a mural of Nickelus F on the side of a building in Oregon Hill, Virginia. Nils Westergard created the mural because he believed that Nickelus F deserved recognition from his hometown of Richmond, Virginia and he was in a unique position to provide it via street art.

== Notable projects and discography ==
- Anything You Can Do I Can Do Better (2002)
- Pistols and Teks (2003)
- B stands for Burglars (2004)
- Cut The Check (2005)
- How To Build a Buzz for Dummies (2006)
- The Relapse (2007)
- For the F of It (2008)
- Rayni Day Entertainment Presents... Umbrella Up Volume 1 ft. Radio B (2008)
- Thank You (2009)
- Thank You: Version: Pi (2009)
- Heathen(2009)
- Go Time (2009)
- R.A.R.E. (Reliving A Real Experience) featuring Portishead (2009)
- Season Premiere (2010)
- Commercials (2010)
- Season Premiere HD (2010)
- Yellow Gold (Nickelus F & Ohbliv) (2011)
- Faces (2011)
- Vices (2013)
- PTPT (2013)
- Yellow Gold 2 (Nickelus F & Ohbliv) (2013)
- "Days like this" from "The Weeping Worm" (Nickelus F & Shawn Kemp/Sean Camp) (2014)
- "Triflin" (2015)
- "Trick Dice" (Nickelus F & Shawn Kemp) (2015)
- "Stretch Marks" (Nickelus F & Namebrand) (2016)
- "Acapellas" (2017)
- "Stuck" (2018)
- "The Gold Mine Volume 1" (2019)
- "The Gold Mine Vol 2" (2019)
- "The Specimen" (2023)
- "MMCHT" (2024)

== Music videos ==
- "Nurp!/Toast & Jelly" (2005)
- "The Motions" (2008)
- "Everything That I Should" (2009)
- "Heathen" (2009)
- "The Beast" (2009)
- "You Too" featuring The Silverust (2009)
- "Aggressive Content" (2010)
- "What Am I Suppose To Do" (2010)
- "Take You With Me" (2010)
- "Reese Witherspoon" (2010)
- "Crushin' Your Toes" (2010)
- "Handsome" (2012)
- "GotDamnMURDAH!" (2013)
- "Painkillerz" (2014)
- "Tanqueray" (2014)
- "Laced Weed" (2016)
- "No Feel" (2016)
- "DUMP YOU IN A RIVAH" (2019)
- "Got Eem / Vibes (Refrain)" (Made 2016, Uploaded 2019)
- "Might As Well" (2019)
- "Sleazie Wonder" (2020)
