= Volcanic Bird Enemy and the Voiced Concern =

Studio album by Lil Ugly Mane
- Released: October 12, 2021
- Recorded: April–July 2021
- Genres: Alternative rock; hypnagogic pop; neo-psychedelia; trip hop; shoegaze; plunderphonics; breakbeat
- Length: 58:15
- Label: Self-released
- Producer: Shawn Kemp

Lil Ugly Mane chronology
| Obedient Form (2021) | Volcanic Bird Enemy and the Voiced Concern (2021) | I Believe the World Would Be a Better Place Without You (2022) |

Singles from Volcanic Bird Enemy and the Voiced Concern
- 1. "Headboard" Released: July 27, 2021; 2. "Porcelain Slightly" Released: September 14, 2021; 3. "Into a Life" Released: September 14, 2021

Professional ratings
Review scores
| Source | Rating |
|---|---|
| Sputnikmusic | 4.4/5 |
| theneedledrop | 7/10 |

Volcanic Bird Enemy and the Voiced Concern is the third studio album by American musician and rapper Lil Ugly Mane. It was self-released via Bandcamp, along with cassette releases on October 12, 2021.

Volcanic Bird Enemy and the Voiced Concern is generally seen as Miller's most experimental, diverse and eccentric album to date. The record garnered positive reviews from publications including Sputnikmusic and Stereogum.

== Track listing ==
All tracks are written by Lil Ugly Mane.

Volcanic Bird Enemy and the Voiced Concern track listing
| No. | Title | Length |
|---|---|---|
| 1. | "Bird Enemy Car" | 3:36 |
| 2. | "With Iron & Bleach & Accidents" | 2:14 |
| 3. | "Benadryl Submarine" | 3:40 |
| 4. | "Human Fly" | 3:16 |
| 5. | "Cold in Here" | 4:00 |
| 6. | "Styrofoam" | 2:48 |
| 7. | "Hostage Master" | 2:20 |
| 8. | "Beach Harness" | 3:22 |
| 9. | "Discard" | 2:49 |
| 10. | "Headboard" | 3:31 |
| 11. | "Into a Life" | 2:36 |
| 12. | "Clapping Seal" | 3:36 |
| 13. | "VPN" | 3:40 |
| 14. | "Swell" | 3:03 |
| 15. | "Stock Car" | 2:36 |
| 16. | "Cursor" | 2:45 |
| 17. | "Bold Futile Flavor" | 1:19 |
| 18. | "Broken Ladder" | 3:13 |
| 19. | "Porcelain Slightly" | 3:51 |
| Total length: | | 58:15 |

Notes

- All tracks are stylized in all caps on Bandcamp, and lowercase elsewhere. For example, "Bird Enemy Car" is stylized as either "BIRD ENEMY CAR" or "bird enemy car".
- "Cursor" contains an extended outro exclusive to music services outside of Bandcamp, totaling the track at 4:18, and the album at 59:57.

== Personnel ==
Credits are adapted from Bandcamp.

- Lil Ugly Mane – vocals, production, instrumentation
- Kora Puckett of Narrow Head – lead guitar on "Headboard"
- Patrick Quinn – cover art
