= Blackland Radio 66.6 =

Mixtape by SpaceGhostPurrp
- Released: May 1, 2011; February 2017 (re-release)
- Recorded: Late February–April 2011
- Genres: Memphis rap; phonk
- Length: 81:11; 44:45 (re-release)
- Labels: Self-released, Yeah We On (re-release)
- Producers: SpaceGhostPurrp; Ahnnu; Hurt-M-Badd

SpaceGhostPurrp chronology
NASA: The Mixtape (2010)	Blackland Radio 66.6 (2011)	GXX XX BXXXK Volume. 1 (2012)

Blackland Radio 66.6 (stylized as Blvcklvnd Rvdix 66.6 (1991) in all caps) is the fourth mixtape by American rapper SpaceGhostPurrp. It was self-released on May 1, 2011, and re-released in February 2017, by Yeah We On Entertainment. The majority of the mixtape is self-produced, and features guest production and vocals from Lil Ugly Mane, Main Attrakionz, Supa Sortahuman, and J.K. the Reaper. The artwork was created by Lil Ugly Mane and Chino Amobi.

== Background ==
The mixtape pays homage to the hip-hop scene of the 1990s, especially Three 6 Mafia's early material, whose influence is evident in tracks such as "Underground" and "Pheel tha Phonk 1990" and on its cover, which was based on the classic Memphis Pen & Pixel style of covers. It features chopped and screwed vocals in some tracks. Media samples from films and games like Mortal Kombat 3 and Godzilla are also included, which was unique to the genre. Themes on this mixtape stem from sex to drug abuse, and while doing so, over lo-fi, trap instrumentals. SpaceGhostPurrp uses southern slang throughout the whole album while using extremely vulgar lyrics.

== Reception ==
Professional ratings
Review scores
Source	Rating
Pitchfork	7.1/10

Brandon Soderberg of Pitchfork gave the mixtape a 7.1 out of 10 rating, stating, "Blvcklvnd Rvdix 66.6 (1991) is a mess of Three 6 Mafia-chanting, woozy Wu-Tang loops, DJ Screw wheeze, and Mortal Kombat and Godzilla sound effects, all paired with an off-the-dome rapping style that's equal parts Lil Wayne and Lil B."

The Miami New Times recognized Blackland Radio 66.6 in its Miami's Ten Best Local Albums, EPs, and Mixtapes of 2011 article, with an in-depth review noting "The Carol City boy takes his raw rap style to the next dimension with touches of horrorcore, dabbling songs with a feminine screech and a Vincent Price-like laugh. He even gets barebones experimental, leaving hardly a beat on his track Get Yah Head Bust."

Duncan C, writing for The Fader, calls the mixtape SpaceGhostPurrp's "greatest and most diverse work to date". He considers "Fuck Taylor Gang (Not a Diss We Are Just Not Dickriders)" to be a Wiz Khalifa diss track. Duncan highlighted the song "Get Yah Head" as an "instant standout".

"Fuck Taylor Gang" was sampled by Playboi Carti on his 2025 studio album Music on the song "Crank".

== Track listing ==
All tracks are written and produced by SpaceGhostPurrp (Markese Rolle), except where noted.

No.	Title	Writer(s)	Producer(s)	Length
1.	"Possessed"			3:04
2.	"Suck a Dick For 2011"			3:15
3.	"Fuck Taylor Gang (Not a Diss We Are Just Not Dickriders)"			2:31
4.	"Get Yah Head Bust"			4:09
5.	"Grind on Me"			2:23
6.	"Like a Strippah"			3:32
7.	"Take dat Dick"			3:15
8.	"Mac Named Purrp"			5:12
9.	"Pheel tha Phonk 1990"			2:01
10.	"Underground"			4:49
11.	"1991 Thowed"			3:12
12.	"Tha Real"			4:34
13.	"My Hood" (performed by Lil Ugly Mane)	Travis Miller	Ahnnu	3:07
14.	"Been Fuego"			5:36
15.	"Captain Planet"			3:36
16.	"Son of Sam" (featuring J.K. the Reaper)	Rolle; Jabril Kenan		2:48
17.	"Osiris of East"			3:42
18.	"Legend of the East Pyramyds"			1:55
19.	"Rath of a Raider"			3:42
20.	"Tha Power"			2:13
21.	"Stoner Gang Raiders" (performed by Sortahuman and Main Attrakionz)	Rolle; Damondre Grice; Charles Glover; Matthew Solley		8:10
22.	"Fuck tha Goldiggaz (Cut Up This Shit Up)"		Hurt-M-Badd	4:37

=== Sample credits ===
- "Pheel tha Phonk" contains a sample of "Late Night Tip" by Three 6 Mafia.
- "Legend of the East Pyramyds" contains a sample of "Strangers" by Portishead.
- "Tha Real" contains a sample of "Tha Muthaphukkin Real" by Eazy-E featuring MC Ren.
- "Fuck tha Goldiggaz" contains a sample of "Against All Odds" by Makaveli.
- "Captain Planet" contains samples of "Remote Viewing" by Tangerine Dream.
- "Underground" contains samples of "Zombie 2 Main Theme" by Zombi 2.
- "Get Yah Head Bust" contains a sample of "Soul Chamber" by Dan Forden.
