= SpaceGhostPurrp =

American rapper and record producer

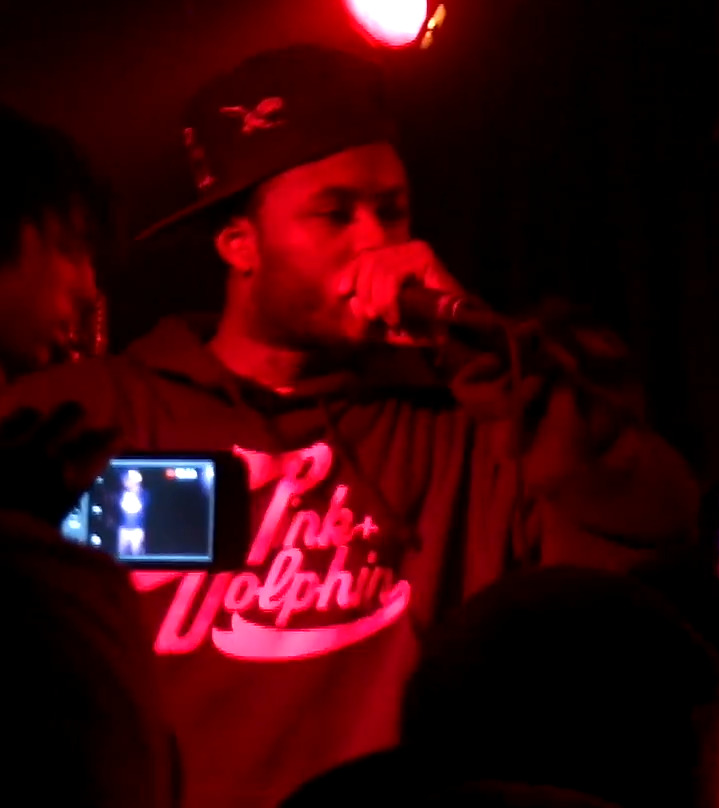
- Rolle performing live in 2013

Background information
- Also known as: SGP; Muney Jordan
- Born: Markese Money Rolle; April 1, 1991 (age 35)
- Origin: Miami, Florida, U.S.
- Genres: Southern hip-hop; cloud rap; trap; dirty rap; experimental hip-hop; tread; phonk
- Occupations: Rapper; record producer; music programmer; songwriter
- Years active: 2008–present
- Labels: Raider Klan; Yeah We On; 4AD
- Formerly of: Raider Klan; BMB Deathrow

Markese Money Rolle (born April 1, 1991), known professionally as SpaceGhostPurrp, is an American rapper and record producer from Miami, Florida. He is the founder of the now-defunct Florida hip-hop group Raider Klan, and a co-founder of the collective BMB Deathrow. He coined and pioneered the phonk subgenre.

Successful Raider Klan members and associates that SpaceGhostPurrp worked with include Denzel Curry, Robb Banks, Pouya, Chris Travis, Black Kray, Lil Ugly Mane, Yung Simmie, Xavier Wulf, and the late Luci4. SGP gathered a following in the underground hip-hop scene through mixtapes, producing, and his work with other underground artists. He has produced tracks for Juicy J, Lil Uzi Vert, Wiz Khalifa, Robb Banks, ASAP Mob, and Lil Tracy, among others. Since 2009, SpaceGhostPurrp has released over 60 mixtapes, albums and EPs. He has since become noteworthy for his bizarre online behavior and controversial persona.

== Early life ==
SpaceGhostPurrp was raised in the neighborhood of Carol City in Miami Gardens, Florida. He began rapping at age 5 and producing at age 13. He attended Silver Trail Middle School in Pembroke Pines and Everglades High School in Miramar. He is of African-American, Bahamian and Cuban descent.

== Career ==
=== 2008–2011: Beginnings and Blackland Radio 66.6 ===
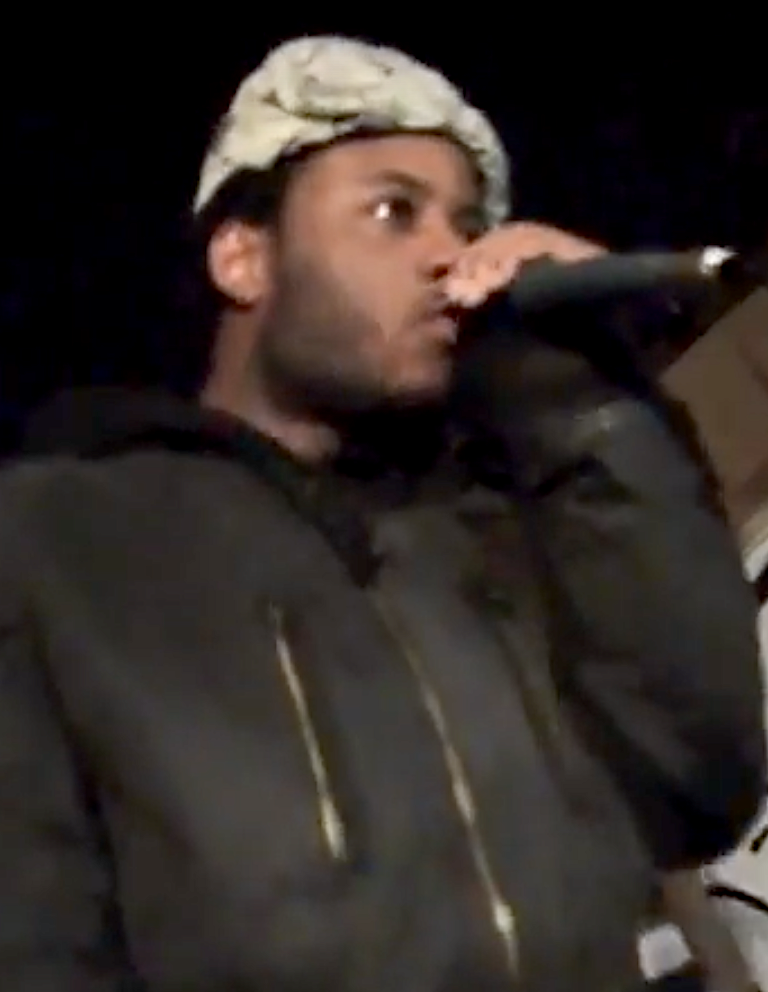
Rolle performing in 2011

In high school, SpaceGhostPurrp began skateboarding frequently but later decided that he wanted to pursue a career in music. He worked to graduate from high school early. SpaceGhostPurrp began uploading music once he created his YouTube channel "Spaceeghostpurrpmj23" on May 23, 2010. SpaceGhostPurrp's early releases contained series of visuals that included Purrped & Chopped songs containing visuals with 1970s/1980s Soul Train aesthetics, Purrped & Chopped Toro y Moi songs, and a Kreayshawn music video.

In August 2010, SpaceGhostPurrp began working on NASA: The Mixtape. SpaceGhostPurrp formed hip-hop collective Raider Klan in 2008 along with Dough Dough Da Don, Kadafi, Muney Junior, and Jitt. Jitt died in 2010. SpaceGhostPurrp recruited various rap artists to Raider Klan, including Denzel Curry, Yung Simmie, Nell, Chris Travis, Xavier Wulf, Rell, Amber London, and Key Nyata, among many others.

At the tail end of 2010 and early 2011, SpaceGhostPurrp began collaborating with Lil Ugly Mane. This led to Ugly Mane doing the artwork for SpaceGhostPurrp's mixtape Blackland Radio 66.6.

A few weeks after Blackland Radio 66.6 was released on May 1, 2011, SpaceGhostPurrp announced he was working on five mixtapes that were all to be released in 2011, consisting of MIND OF PURRP, SUMMA PHONK VOL.ONE, TRILLUMINATTI, BLVCK MVRDOC, and a collaboration project with Mishka NYC titled SON OF EYE. SpaceGhostPurrp released singles for all these mixtapes, however, the tapes were never released due to his change in artistic direction once he landed and stayed in New York to begin collaborating with the ASAP Mob. In the summer of 2011, SpaceGhostPurrp was also working with fellow rappers Speak! and Juicy J.

SpaceGhostPurrp went on to New York in August 2011 to live and work with members from the ASAP Mob. In late September 2011, SpaceGhostPurrp announced he was dismissing Trilluminatti and was now working on a new mixtape that was to be titled GOD OF BLVCK. This mixtape was released in February 2012.

=== 2012–2013: Mysterious Phonk: The Chronicles of SpaceGhostPurrp ===
In early 2012 SpaceGhostPurrp signed a one-off record deal with British indie label 4AD and began remixing tracks from his earlier mix tapes for his debut album. Most of his early songs feature samples from sources such as train whistles, female porn stars, and sound effects from the soundtrack of Mortal Kombat, as well as from other video game series. In addition to his own songs, he produced beats for other artists, mainly being members of the Raider Klan. He produced one track titled "T.A.P." for Taylor Allderdice, a mixtape by Wiz Khalifa, as well as "Keep it G" and "Pretty Flacko" for ASAP Rocky.

His debut album, titled Mysterious Phonk: Chronicles of SpaceGhostPurrp, was released on June 12, 2012, and consists mostly of remixed tracks from previous mixtapes. He occasionally worked with rapper Juicy J and has produced a number of tracks from Juicy J's Blue Dream & Lean. He also guest stars on Juicy J's "Deez Bitches Rollin'" with rapper fellow Speakz. SpaceGhostPurrp also featured on Domo Genesis's and The Alchemist's debut collaboration album No Idols on the track "Daily News" (also featuring Earl Sweatshirt and Action Bronson), as well as Freddie Gibbs' "Kush Cloud" along with Krayzie Bone.

SpaceGhostPurrp revealed in a 2012 interview that there was a project planned between him and rap group Odd Future, which has supported him by playing his music at shows since he released the mixtape BLACKLAND RADIO 66.6.

On July 16, 2012, SpaceGhostPurrp began his first tour with hardcore punk band Trash Talk. The mini tour lasted from July 16 to 23, performing four shows in California, one in Oregon, and two in Washington. His song "The Black God" was named #46 on Pitchfork's 50 best songs of 2012 list. He also performed in Miami during Ultra Music Festival on March 17, 2013, alongside fellow Raider Klan members Yung Simmie and Klan Rico.

=== 2014–2015: IntoXXXicated and other projects ===
On January 19, 2014, SpaceGhostPurrp released a compilation titled 58 Blunts of Purrp, consisting of his own songs, hard to find tracks, and some he either produced or had a feature on. On February 28, 2014, SpaceGhostPurrp released an 18-track mixtape called B.M.W. 2: IntoXXXicated, which included no features and returned to the lo-fi sound of his earlier mixtapes. Subsequently, he released a slightly different version of B.M.W. 2: IntoXXXicated that had tempos of certain songs changed, and while the overall sound quality was slightly improved it still retained much of the lo-fi qualities it had before. A few months later it was remastered, had some tracks removed, a new track added, and released as an album on iTunes under the name IntoXXXicated.

Early in 2015, SpaceGhostPurrp released two new projects, the first of which was titled Dark Angel and released on January 13. The second project, a 5-track EP called Money Mendoza was released on January 25. Later that year, SpaceGhostPurrp left Miami and moved to Atlanta, where he made music with artists such as Father and OG Maco. In April 2015, SpaceGhostPurrp released two compilations. One was titled VENENO, it being an extended version of the EP released earlier that year, and the other was titled PYRO Era, consisting mostly of loose tracks released in 2014 and 2015. On May 9, a new EP called Richest Revenge was released under the moniker Money Mendoza through his Instagram account. In May 2015, Raider Klan released Raider Klan Records: The Mixtape, which featured some production and vocals from SpaceGhostPurrp.

On June 24, 2015, Dej Loaf released a song featuring Young Thug titled "Shawty", co-produced by Young Roc, which sampled the instrumental of the song "RAIDER PRAYER" from SpaceGhostPurrp's album Mysterious Phonk: The Chronicles of SPACEGHOSTPURRP. SpaceGhostPurrp was uncredited by the producer, resulting in a minor conflict via Twitter, which was soon resolved peacefully.

=== 2016–present: Blackland Radio 66.6 2 and 3 ===
On May 9, 2016, SpaceGhostPurrp released a mixtape entitled Blackland Radio 66.6: Pt 2 - Episode 1 exclusively on DatPiff. He stated that he had plans to release subsequent volumes under Part 2, but eventually opted to skip straight to the release of Blackland Radio 3 on March 4, 2018.

As 2016 concluded, Tiny Mix Tapes recognized SpaceGhostPurrp's Black Money Boys Death Row (BMB) collective as one of its favorite labels for 2016, noting that:

BMB's sound is a sinister twist on the MySpace-era material churned out by Soulja Boy and Lil B, tinged with Glo Gang's hazy drill hedonism. Affiliates' discographies are often spread across multiple SoundCloud accounts, hosted by friends, buried in prolific back catalogues, and are sometimes deleted days after their conception. To follow BMB Death Row is to keep their web presence under constant surveillance or risk missing out on a clutch new cut.

In early 2017, SpaceGhostPurrp signed a deal with label Yeah We On Entertainment, LLC, with the label distributing previously released works by SpaceGhostPurrp under its name. SpaceGhostPurrp would sign to internet label Dismiss Yourself in 2020, which released an archive of his projects, along with new compilation albums. The label started an archive page on SoundCloud which contains every official and unofficial project along with releasing vinyls of projects.

On March 14, 2025, SpaceGhostPurrp released the extended play WELCOME TO MIAMI DADE COUNTY THE MIXTAPE.

== Artistry ==
SpaceGhostPurrp has listed many artists as an influence, which include Kanye West, Wiz Khalifa, Gucci Mane, Poison Clan, Paris, Three 6 Mafia, UGK, Bone Thugs-N-Harmony, Big L, Eazy-E, 2Pac, and DJ Screw. SpaceGhostPurrp has also stated he is a dedicated fan of the Swedish extreme metal band Meshuggah.

SpaceGhostPurrp has collaborated with many of his influences, namely Juicy J on his mixtape Blue Dream & Lean, released in 2012. He often attributes his dark "phonk" sound to the dangerous and violent environment he grew up around in Carol City, which he refers to as "Blackland". SpaceGhostPurrp linked the area to the underworld with his references to hell, and the satanic symbolism in his critically acclaimed mixtape Blackland Radio 66.6. He, as well as other Raider Klan members, has made references to the shooting of Trayvon Martin, and he has made a tribute song titled "No Evidence" which was released on his album Mysterious Phonk: The Chronicles of SpaceGhostPurrp.

SpaceGhostPurrp's name is derived from that of the central character of Hanna-Barbera's 1966 TV series Space Ghost and its 1994 parody talk show spinoff, Space Ghost Coast to Coast.

== Feuds ==
In late 2011, ASAP Yams, an A&R artist and co-founder of the then-independent ASAP Mob artist collective, discovered SpaceGhostPurrp and his music through Tumblr. Yams told SpaceGhostPurrp he enjoyed his Blackland Radio 66.6 mixtape and invited him to join up with ASAP Mob in New York City. SpaceGhostPurrp began producing music for ASAP Rocky, who was a big fan of SpaceGhostPurrp's music, including "Keep it G" from Rocky's breakout mixtape, Live. Love. A$AP.

SpaceGhostPurrp and ASAP Mob remained friends until SpaceGhostPurrp had an argument with ASAP Twelvyy on Twitter in December 2011. This led to Rocky dissing Raider Klan on a song called "Yao Ming (Remix)". That release from Rocky furthered the Twitter fight between SpaceGhostPurrp and ASAP Mob, but the fight was short-lived when other ASAP Mob members spoke for SpaceGhostPurrp's sake.

About a week afterward, Rocky released "Pretty Flacko" as a shout-out to the Trillwave genre and SpaceGhostPurrp. SpaceGhostPurrp and ASAP Mob members were on good terms again up until April 2012, when ASAP Mob played an unreleased SpaceGhostPurrp track at Coachella, leading to another short-lived argument ending on bad terms, this time between SpaceGhostPurrp and ASAP Yams. Through the rest of 2012 and early 2013, ASAP Mob used some of SpaceGhostPurrp's music production without giving him credit to make the tracks "I Need Money" (which later became "Max Julien") and "Suddenly" by ASAP Rocky.

The feud was quiet and they seemed to be on good terms until former Raider Klan member Stoops was assaulted by ASAP Twelvyy in June 2012. This caused the feud between SpaceGhostPurrp and Twelvyy to reach its peak and eventually extend to the entirety of Raider Klan and ASAP Mob. The feud quickly turned physical in November 2012 when affiliates of Raider Klan alongside SpaceGhostPurrp attacked members of ASAP Mob outside Miami. This led to ASAP Nast calling the police and SpaceGhostPurrp being arrested.

In March 2013, SpaceGhostPurrp and affiliates once again attacked ASAP Mob in their home city of New York. The feud quickly began to die down in terms of aggression and took to social media. According to SpaceGhostPurrp, the feud with ASAP Mob was resolved before the death of ASAP Yams in 2015. However, ASAP Bari prevented SpaceGhostPurrp and ASAP from reuniting, thus perpetuating the conflict.

In May 2025, SpaceGhostPurrp announced that he and ASAP Rocky ended their feud on Twitter.

== Discography ==
=== Studio albums ===
- Mysterious Phonk: Chronicles of SpaceGhostPurrp (2012)
- Belaire Black Bottle Boyz (Carol City to West Atlanta Zone 1) (2023)

=== Extended plays ===
- Why So Serious (as Muney Accardo) (2009)
- Larry Bird Season (2014)
- Dark Angel (2015)
- Money Mendoza (2015)
- Richest Revenge (as Money Mendoza) (2015)
- New Season 2K17 (2016)
- Richest Revenge 2 (2017)
- Winter's Mine 4 (2017)
- Angry America (2017)
- Miami Music Pistol Music Homicide Music (as SpaceGhostPurrp Da Lean Plug) (2017)
- Qream (2017)
- Overkill 2 (2017)
- Enemies (2017)
- Underworld (with Spookyli) (2017)
- Florida Baby (2017)
- Florida Stick Drill (2017)
- Bal Harbour (2018)
- MarDragon (2018)
- Lil Vamp (2018)
- Blood Moon (as Vampire Money) (2018)
- Rihanna's Baby Daddy (2018)
- Florida Flame (2019)
- Miami Carol City (2019)
- Florida Finna Kill da Whole World (2019)
- Deathlanta (2020)
- Z-REX 3005 (2020)
- Miami Dade County Dark Trap Music (as Money Miami aka SpaceGhostPurrp) (2022)
- Zone 4 Carol City (2022)
- Her Loss After Dark (2022)
- Blackland Radio 4 Pt.1 (as Money aka SpaceGhostPurrp) (2023)
- Blackland Radio 4 Pt. 2 : GTA 6 Miami Gardens Welcome to Carol City (as Money aka SpaceGhostPurrp) (2023)
- Blackland Radio 4 Part 3 (2023)
- BLACKLAND RADIO 4 PART 4: A$AP M.O.N.E.Y. (LIFE AFTER ASAP) (2023)
- MarDragon 2 (2024)
- Black Storm (2024)

=== Mixtapes ===
- Wavvy Chronicles (as Muney Jordan) (2010)
- NASA: The Mixtape (2010)
- Purpped & Chopped (2011)
- BLVCKLVND RVDIX 66.6 (1991) (2011)
- CLVB NVZV 1995: Purrped & Chopped (2011)
- GXX XX BXXXK Volume. 1 (2012)
- B.M.W. (2012)
- The Winter's Mine (2013)
- B.M.W. 2: IntoXXXicated (2014)
- IntoXXXicated (2014)
- NASA Gang (Remastered) (2014)
- Dark Angel Instrumentals (2015)
- Winter's Mine 2 (2015)
- Veneno (2015)
- Winter's Mine 3 (2015)
- Chopped by Purrp (2016)
- Blackland Radio 66.6: Pt 2 - Episode 1 (2016)
- Blood Red Moet (2016)
- Overkill (2016)
- Purrple Haze (as Purrple Haze) (2016)
- ICX CRXVM DXMXN 1.8 (with Spookyli) (2017)
- Blackland Radio 66.6, Pt. 3 (Vamp Money) (2018)
- VAMPIRE LIFE THE MIXTAPE (FREE JIM JONES MIXTAPE) (2018)
- Gladiator Season (Volume 1) (with TrippJones) (2018)
- Welcome to Vampland (with Spookyli) (2019)
- Please Don't Wake Me; I Am Exhausted (with XVNИ¥) (2019)
- Dragon Nigga No Slime (2019)
- SpaceGhostPussy Response (2020)
- Dark Angels (2020)
- VODECi: Dark R&B Mixtape (with Black Kray, 4jay, and Diamondsonmydick) (2021)
- The End of PlayboiCarti (2021)
- Blackland Radio 66.6, Pt. 4 (2023)
- ATLANTA THE MIXTAPE (2024)
- WELCOME TO MIAMI DADE COUNTY (2025)

=== Singles ===
- "Friday (Strip Club)" (2010)
- "Bend Ova Like That" (with Robb Bank$) (2012)
- "D.U.R.S. (Hypebeast)" (2014)
- "Bloody Tines Day" (2016)
- "Black On Black" (2016)
- "R.I.P. YAMS" (with A$AP Rocky) (2016)
- "Movin Weight" (2016)
- "This" (with Clip275) (2019)
- "Dade County" (2020)
- "223" (2020)
- "Carol City" (with OG Junko) (2021)
- "Cynthia G" (2021)
- "DENZEL PUSSY" (2023)
- "Blitz All Opps" (2024)
- "BANG DEN" (with Robb Banks) (2026)

=== Mixes ===
- Nate Dogg: Purrped & Chopped (2011)
- Alize Mix (2012)
- PYRO MIXX 2015 (2015)
- Goth Money Talibanz 2015 Mix (2015)
- December Mixx (2015)
- BLVCK MVNXXY JXRDVN MIXX (with BMB Loko Los) (2016)
- The New Wave: 2k16-HotBoyz (2016)
- Terror Gang: Dark Riddim (2018)
- Ashview Heights Legend (as SpaceGhoztPurrp) (2019)
- Northside Drive Zone 2 ATL 2020 (as Money AKA SpaceGhostPurrp) (2020)
- DJ MIXX 1 (as DJ VAMPIRE MONEY) (2021)

=== Compilations ===
- NASA Underground - Lost Tapes: 1991–'93 (2010)
- NASA Underground - Lost Tapes: 1994–'96 (2010)
- NASA Underground - Lost Tapes: 1997–2000 (2011)
- Blvck Phonk (2012)
- Best of SGP: Sizzurp Tape (2013)
- 58 Blunts of Purrp (2014)

=== Guest appearances ===
List of non-single guest appearances, with other performing artists, showing year released and album name
Title	Year	Artist(s)	Album
"Purple Swag: Chapter 2"	2011	ASAP Rocky, ASAP Nast	Live. Love. ASAP
"Keep It G"	2011	ASAP Rocky, Chance Infinite	Live. Love. ASAP
"Real Hustlers Don't Sleep"	2011	Juicy J, ASAP Rocky	Blue Dream and Lean
"Deez Bitches Rollin'"	2011	Juicy J, Speak!	Blue Dream and Lean
"Slap a Fat Bitch"	2012	Propr Boyz	Prxpr Bxyz
"Raider Klan Phonk Freestyle"	2012	Denzel Curry, Ruben Slikk	King of the Mischievous South Vol. 1
"Mink Rug"	2012	Wali Da Great	Mink Rug
"Outro"	2012	Soulja Mook, Pouya, Denzel Curry, Lofty305, Yung Raw	M.I.Alien
"The Daily News"	2012	Domo Genesis, Alchemist, Earl Sweatshirt, Action Bronson	No Idols
"Kush Cloud"	2012	Freddie Gibbs, Krayzie Bone	Baby Face Killa
"Roaches" (Remix)	2012	¡Mayday!, Cyhi the Prynce	—N/a
"Murder on My Mind"	2013	Da Mafia 6ix, Krayzie Bone, Bizzy Bone	6iX Commandments
"Flexin"	2013	Robb Bank$, Neva Bitch, Yung Lean	—N/a
"Picture Me"	2015	Lofty305	Cokeyshoresmotosports Vol. 1
"Late Night Tippin"	2015	Burgos	Trill List
"PB&J"	2024	Robb Bank$	i think i might be happy, pt.2

== Production discography ==
=== 2011 ===
Lil Ugly Mane - Doing Badass Improvisational Stuff Rag For Piano

- "Throw Dem Gunz (2011 unreleased rough unfinished first demo version)"

A$AP Rocky - LIVE.LOVE.A$AP

- 09. "Keep It G" (featuring Chace Infinite and SpaceGhostPurrp)

Sortahuman - Lysergic Bliss

- 07. "Stonergang" (featuring Main Attrakionz)

A$AP Ant -

- "BLVCK TVPE" (featuring Spaceghostpurrp)

A$AP Twelvyy -

- "Dope Sample"

Sortahuman - Stonergang

- 01. "The Anthem"
- 02. "Early Morning" (featuring Dizzy D and J.K. The Reaper)
- 05. "Where They Do That At"
- 12. "Nothin But The Best" (featuring Dizzy D)

=== 2012 ===
A$AP Rocky -

- "Pretty Flacko"

Denzel Curry - King of the Mischievous South, Vol. 1

- 02. "Headcrack"
- 04. "Phantazm '96"
- 05. "Gankin 1993-1995" (featuring J.K. The Reaper)
- 15. "Raider Klan Phonk Freestyle" (featuring Ruben Slikk and SpaceGhostPurrp)

Yung Simmie - G Funk Resurrection 1993-1995

- 11. "Captain Planet (Rvidxr Klvn Purrp Tribute ‘94)"

Wiz Khalifa - Taylor Allderdice

- 12. "T.A.P." (featuring Juicy J)

J.K. The Reaper - Ill Life

- 15. "Gankin'" (featuring Denzel Curry)
- 17. "Son of Sam"

Amber London - 1994 EP

- 07. "Low MF Key"

Lofty305 – Intimacy

- 2. "Feel Pt.2"

Metro Zu - HEAVEN

- 07. "Cyberpunk Phonk"

Robb Banks -

- "Look Like Basquiat" (produced with Rah)

Denzel Curry - Strictly 4 My R.V.I.D.X.R.Z.

- 11. "Headcrack" (featuring Yung Simmie)
- 13. "Ridin n Da Back" (featuring Amber London and Xavier Wulf)
- 16. "Son of Sam (Fang Tribute)"
- 17. "Headcrack Remix" (featuring Yung Simmie and Young Renegade)

Juicy J - Blue Dream & Lean Reloaded

- 01. "20 Zig Zags" (featuring Wiz Khalifa)

Robb Banks -

- "Refined"

Denzel Curry -

- "Mystical Virus Pt. 2"

Knocka -

- "Watch Out"

A$AP TyY-

- "Ryder Shit"

=== 2013 ===
A$AP Rocky - LONG.LIVE.A$AP

- 17. "Pretty Flacko (Remix)" (featuring Gucci Mane, Waka Flocka Flame, and Pharrell)

Chris Travis - Side Effects

- 03. "Diamonds Pt. 2"

Chris Travis - K.O.T.U. Greatest Hits

- 24. "Anything You Wanna Do"

Grandmilly - BVNDVNVZ II

- 14. "Zombies"

Gangsta Boo -

- "Vibin'"

Dough Dough Da Don - Century of a Raider

- 08. "Know Bout Me" (featuring SpaceGhostPurrp as Muney Jordan) (produced as Muney Jordan)

Denzel Curry -

- "Live This Shit"

Yung Simmie - Shut Up and Vibe Vol. 1

- 15. "Disrespect" (featuring SpaceGhostPurrp)

Nell - The Revolution '94

- 13. "The Outro"

Lil Champ FWAY -

- "Graveyard Shift" (featuring Yung Simmie and Denzel Curry)

Robb Banks - Tha City

- 01. "Flex (City)" (produced with Nuri)
- 02. "KDia (CT)" (featuring Phlo Finister) (produced with Nuri)
- 04. "All The Way Live (Ft. Lauderdale)" (produced with Nuri)
- 05. "Counted (LA)" (produced with Nuri)
- 08. "Changed (Miami)" (featuring Lofty305) (produced with Nuri and Freebase)
- 11. "Broward County Legend (Coral Springs)"

Black Smurf -

- "Pretty Thuggin"

Da Mafia 6ix - 6ix Commandments

- 07. "Murder On My Mind" (featuring SpaceGhostPurrp, Krayzie Bone, and Bizzy Bone) (produced with DJ Paul and JGRXXN)

Sokół and Marysia Starosta - Czarna biała magia

- 01. "Proporcje" (scratches: DJ Nelson)
- 11. "Chujowo wyszło" (scratches: DJ. B)

=== 2014 ===
Lil Uzi Vert - Purple Thoughtz EP Vol. 1

- 02. "White Shit"

Nell - Vice City

- 11. "Bust Ya Head Open" (featuring T-Rone, Big Bo, and Denzel Curry)
- 12. "Breaker Breaker"

Black Kray -

- "Lil Rari"

Goth Money Records - Goth Money Tech Palms For The 99-2005

- 03. "Goth Money World" (performed by Black Kray featuring SpaceGhostPurrp)

Chris Travis - Silence of Me Eternally

- 04. "Just Ashin"

=== 2015 ===
Kane Grocerys - 777

- 02. "Taliban World" (featuring Black Kray)

Robb Banks - Year of the Savage

- 11. "2PhoneShawty"

Amber London -

- "Addicts"

TRAUMATIZE - Spawn 1991

- 01. "Honus Wagner"
- 06. "Conscious Revolution"

Thouxanbanfauni -

- "Nue Nue II (NUER) (featuring RixkyB@NDS)"

=== 2016 ===
Cursed - 6 Shots

- 01. "6 Shots"

Chxpo x Black Kray -

- "So Icey Goth La Flexico's"

Mystix & TRAUMATIZE - Parables

- 01. "Parables"
- 02. "The Mask"
- 03. "Nymphaea Red Flare"

Syringe -

- "Black Lips Rigging Shit"

=== 2017 ===
Chxpo -

- "Demon"

SpookyLi - ICX CRXVM DXMON 1.8

- All eight tracks produced by SpaceGhostPurrp

SpookyLi -

- "Sub-Zero"

5G - LOR5TH

- 13. "Different States"

Lil Tracy -

- "Danglin"

SpookyLi - Underworld EP

- All five tracks produced by SpaceGhostPurrp, Track 5 remixed by BMB Loko Los

Diamondsonmydick - Bloodrayne

- 03. "Bloodrayne"

KirbLaGoop - Trapped In Da 100

- 05. "Jaw Lock"

=== 2018 ===
Marcy Mane and WifiGawd - MOETOWN

- 08. "Holditdownmoe" (performed by Phlegm and Marcy Mane)

TrippJones - Machine Smoke

- 12. "MachineDream" (featuring Morgue!)

AGoff - Trap Files 10

- 06. "I'm Not Free"

=== 2019 ===
XVNNY - Please Don't Wake Me; I Am Exhausted

- Full album

=== 2022 ===
AKOGE

- "LOCK N' LOAD"

=== 2023 ===
Xaviersobased

- "Left Hand"

=== 2025 ===
Playboi Carti - Music

- "CRANK" (sample; produced by Cardo Got Wings, Yung Exclusive and Johnny Juliano)
