= Rich Brian discography =

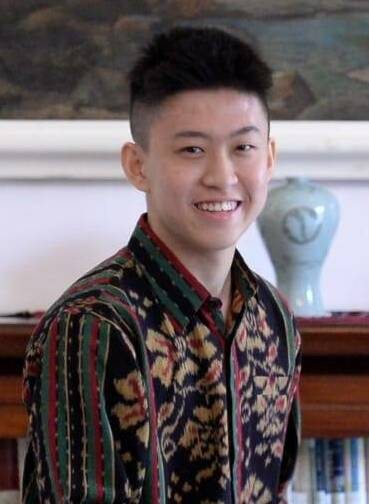
- Rich Brian in 2019
- Studio albums: 3
- EPs: 2
- Singles: 24

The discography of Indonesian rapper Rich Brian consists of three studio albums and two extended plays (EP). His debut studio album, Amen (2018), peaked at number 18 in the United States and Canada, number 27 in Australia, and reached the top ten on the US Top R&B/Hip-Hop Albums chart.

== Studio albums ==
List of studio albums, with selected chart positions and details
Title	Album details	Peak chart positions									
Title	Album details	AUS	BEL (FL)	CAN	NLD	NZ	UK	UK R&B	US	US R&B /HH	US R&B
Amen	Released: 2 February 2018; Label: 88rising, Empire; Formats: LP, digital download	27	108	18	61	30	87	27	18	11	8
The Sailor	Released: 26 July 2019; Labels: 88rising, 12 Tone Music; Format: LP, digital download	77	—	74	89	27	—	—	62	31	—
Where Is My Head?	Released: 15 August 2025; Labels: 88rising; Format: LP, digital download	—	—	—	—	—	—	—	—	—	—
"—" denotes album that did not chart or was not released.

== Extended plays ==
List of studio albums, with selected chart positions and details
Title	Album details
1999	Released: 25 August 2020; Label: 88rising, 12Tone Music; Formats: Digital download
Brightside	Released: 20 January 2022; Label: 88rising, 12Tone Music; Formats: Digital download

== Singles ==
=== As lead artist ===
List of singles, showing year released and selected chart positions
Title	Year	Peak chart positions		Certifications	Album
Title	Year	US RB/HH Bub.	NZ Heat.	Certifications	Album
"Dat Stick"	2016	4	—	RIAA: Gold; RMNZ: Gold	Non-album singles
"Who That Be"	2016	—	—		Non-album singles
"Seventeen"	2016	—	—		Non-album singles
"Back at It"	2017	—	—		Non-album singles
"Gospel" (with Keith Ape and XXXTentacion)	2017	7	4	RIAA: Gold; RMNZ: Gold	Non-album singles
"Glow Like Dat"	2017	—	7		Amen
"Chaos"	2017	—	—		Amen
"Crisis" (featuring 21 Savage)	2017	—	10		Non-album single
"See Me"	2018	—	—		Amen
"18" (with Kris Wu, Joji, Trippie Redd, and Baauer)	2018	—	—		Non-album singles
"Watch Out!"	2018	—	—		Non-album singles
"History" (with 88rising)	2018	—	—	RIAA: Gold	Head in the Clouds
"Yellow" (featuring Bekon)	2019	—	—		The Sailor
"Kids"	2019	—	—		The Sailor
"These Nights" (with 88rising and Chungha)	2019	—	—		Heads in the Clouds II
"Bali" (with Guapdad 4000)	2020	—	—		Non-album single
"Love in My Pocket"	2020	—	—		1999
"Don't Care"	2020	—	—		1999
"Sydney"	2021	—	—		Non-album single
"California" (with 88rising and Niki featuring Warren Hue)	2021	—	—		Head in the Clouds III
"Lazy Susan" (with 21 Savage featuring Warren Hue and MaSiWei)	2021	—	—		Shang-Chi and the Legend of the Ten Rings: The Album
"New Tooth"	2021	—	—		Brightside
"C'est la Vie" (with Yung Gravy and Bbno$)	2022	—	—		Marvelous
"Vivid" (featuring Snot)	2022	—	—		Non-album single
"Little Ray of Light"	2025	—	—		Where is My Head?
"Butterfly"	2025	—	—		Where is My Head?
Tear	2026	—	—		Non-album single
"—" denotes single that did not chart or was not released.

=== As featured artist ===
Title	Year	Peak chart positions									Certifications	Album
Title	Year	CAN	FIN	NOR	NZ Hot	US Alt.	US Dance Elec.	US Rock	US R&B	WW	Certifications	Album
"Turbo Thot 3000" (MaxxJamez featuring Parade, Klimatic Jay, Boy Gwaan, and Rich Chigga)	2016	—	—	—	—	—	—	—	—	—		Non-album singles
"Bankroll" (Diplo featuring Rich Chigga, Young Thug, and Rich the Kid)	2017	—	—	—	—	—	—	—	—	—		Non-album singles
"Midsummer Madness" (88rising featuring Joji, Rich Brian, Higher Brothers, and 8 August)	2018	—	—	—	—	—	—	—	23	—	RIAA: Platinum; RMNZ: Gold	Head in the Clouds
"Zombie" (Higher Brothers featuring Rich Brian)	2019	—	—	—	—	—	—	—	—	—		Five Stars
"Titanic" (Jackson Wang featuring Rich Brian)	2019	—	—	—	—	—	—	—	—	—		Mirrors
"Time Machine" (Diamond Pistols featuring Rich Brian)	2020	—	—	—	—	—	—	—	—	—		Time Machine
"Edamame" (bbno$ featuring Rich Brian)	2021	15	8	24	7	12	—	13	—	169	BPI: Gold; MC: 5× Platinum; RIAA: Gold; RMNZ: 2× Platinum	Eat Ya Veggies
"Run It" (DJ Snake featuring Rick Ross and Rich Brian)	2021	—	—	—	—	—	13	—	—	—		Shang-Chi and the Legend of the Ten Rings: The Album
"—" denotes single that did not chart or was not released.

== Other charted songs ==
List of other charted songs, showing year released and selected chart positions
Title	Year	Peak chart positions		Album
Title	Year	IDN	NZ Hot	Album
"100 Degrees"	2019	4	39	The Sailor

=== Guest appearances ===
List of non-single guest appearances, with other performing artists, showing year released and album name
Title	Year	Other performer(s)	Album
"Red Rubies"	2018	88rising, Yung Bans, Yung Pinch, Higher Brothers and Don Krez	Head in the Clouds
"Beam"	2018	88rising and Playboi Carti	Head in the Clouds
"Disrespectin"	2018	88rising, Higher Brothers and 8 August	Head in the Clouds
"Shouldn't Couldn't Wouldn't"	2019	88rising and Niki	Head in the Clouds II
"Hopscotch"	2019	88rising, 8 August, Joji and Barney Bones	Head in the Clouds II
"2 The Face"	2019	88rising and Higher Brothers	Head in the Clouds II
"Always Rising"	2021	Niki and Warren Hue	Shang-Chi and the Legend of the Ten Rings: The Album
"Foolish"	2021	Warren Hue and Guapdad 4000	Shang-Chi and the Legend of the Ten Rings: The Album
"Act Up"	2021	EarthGang	Shang-Chi and the Legend of the Ten Rings: The Album

=== Remixes ===
List of remixes, showing year released and original artists
Title	Year	Original artist(s)
"Dat Stick (Remix)" (featuring Ghostface Killah and Pouya)	2016	Rich Brian
"Who That Be (Josh Pan & West1ne Remix)"	2016	Rich Brian
"Working for It (Remix)"	2017	Zhu, Skrillex, They.
"IDGAF (Rich Brian and Diablo Remix)"	2018	Dua Lipa
"Love In My Pocket (Weird Genius Remix)"	2020	Rich Brian
"Midsummer Madness 20 (Danny Ocean Remix)"	2020	88rising, Rich Brian, Joji, Higher Brothers, 8 August
