= Head in the Clouds Festival =

Music festival

- Genre: Hip hop, R&B
- Frequency: Annual
- Locations: Los Angeles (2018–19); Pasadena (2021–present); New York City (2023–present)
- Years active: 2018–2019, 2021–present
- Founders: 88rising
- Website: https://hitcfestival.com/

Head in the Clouds Festival is an annual music festival organized by 88rising. The lineups feature musical artists across the Asian diaspora.

== Background ==
In 2015, Jaeson Ma and Sean Miyashiro founded 88rising as a music collective and management company geared towards representing artists from the Asian diaspora. Over two years, they began managing a small stable of Asian rappers focused on forming a hip hop collective. Their first performance took place in 2017 in Los Angeles with Rich Brian, Joji, and Keith Ape all performing live and the Higher Brothers streaming from Chengdu. The collective then embarked on a Double Happiness tour in February 2018, demonstrating the demand for Asian rap performances in the United States.

== History ==
=== 2018–2019 ===
On September 22, 2018, 88rising presented its inaugural Head In The Clouds Festival at the Los Angeles State Historic Park. The lineup included acts based in North American and Asian music industries, including Rich Brian, Joji, Keith Ape, Niki, Higher Brothers, Dumbfoundead, and others. Japanese rapper Kohh made his debut United States performance.

On August 17, 2019, 88rising held their second annual Head in the Clouds music festival at Los Angeles State Historic Park. The lineup included the return of Rich Brian, Joji, Higher Brothers, Niki, and Dumbfoundead. The festival also included artists established in the South Korean music industry, including iKON, Jackson Wang, and DPR Live. Local food festival organizer 626 Night Market coordinated food offerings. Outlets began referring to the festival as the "Asian Coachella".

=== 2020–present ===
88rising had planned for the 2020 Head in the Clouds festival to take place in the JIExpo Kemayoran of Jakarta, Indonesia in March 2020, with a lineup including DAY6 and Chung Ha as well as label members, Rich Brian, Niki, Joji, Higher Brothers, Stephanie Poetri, August08, and Dumbfoundead. It was eventually canceled due to the COVID-19 pandemic. In its place, 88rising held a free online concert called the "Asia Rising Forever Festival" to raise charitable funds for the purpose of combating the raise of anti-Asian sentiment.

For 2021, 88rising announced they would return to hosting live audiences and would hold the festival over the weekend of November 6 and 7 at Brookside at the Rose Bowl. It would be organized by Goldenvoice, the promoters for Coachella. The lineup included Saweetie, CL, Japanese Breakfast, Beabadoobee, Umi, The Linda Lindas, eaJ, keshi, Joji, BIBI, Niki, Seori, and Rich Brian.

The 2022 festival was held at Brookside at the Rose Bowl in Pasadena from August 20–21, 2022. International editions were also held in Jakarta at the Community Park PIK 2 on December 3–4, and in Manila at the SMDC Concert Grounds on December 9–10, 2022.

The 2023 festival was held at Forest Hills Stadium in Queens, New York City from May 20–21, 2023, as well as at Brookside at the Rose Bowl in Pasadena from August 5–6 and at the Guangzhou Chimelong Music Square in Guangzhou, China from September 23–24. The 2024 festival was held solely at the Forest Hills Stadium in Queens, New York from May 11–12, 2024.

Two festivals were held in 2025, one at Nansha Music Plaza in Guangzhou, China from May 1–2, and another at Brookside at the Rose Bowl in Pasadena from May 31 to June 1.

In 2026, a festival was held at Makuhari Messe in Chiba, Japan on March 28 and March 29, 2026.

== Editions ==
Dates and locations of Head in the Clouds Festival
Year	Date(s)	Host city(s) and country(s)	Venue	Ref.
2018	September 22	Los Angeles, California, United States	Los Angeles State Historic Park	
2019	August 17	Los Angeles, California, United States	Los Angeles State Historic Park	
2021	November 6–7	Pasadena, California, United States	Brookside Golf Course (Note: Labeled as Brookside at the Rose Bowl in promotional material.)	
2022	August 20–21	Pasadena, California, United States	Brookside Golf Course	
2022	December 3–4	Tangerang Regency, Indonesia (Note: Labeled as Jakarta in promotional material.)	Community Park PIK 2	
2022	December 9–10	Parañaque, Philippines (Note: Labeled as Manila in promotional material.)	SMDC Concert Grounds	
2023	May 20–21	New York City, New York, United States	Forest Hills Stadium	
2023	August 5–6	Pasadena, California, United States	Brookside Golf Course	
2023	September 23–24	Guangzhou, China	Guangzhou Chimelong Music Square	
2024	May 11–12	New York City, New York, United States	Forest Hills Stadium	
2025	May 1–2	Guangzhou, China	Nansha Music Plaza	
2025	May 31 – June 1	Pasadena, California, United States	Brookside Golf Course	
2026	March 28–29	Chiba, Japan (Note: Labeled as Tokyo in promotional material.)	Makuhari Messe	
2026	August 8	Pasadena, California, United States	Brookside Golf Course	

== Line-ups ==
Head in the Clouds Festival line-ups by year
Year	Date	Performer(s)			Ref.
Year	Date	Main/88rising/88 Stage	Double Happiness Stage	Other stages	Ref.
2018	September 22	Anderson .Paak (special surprise guest); Rich Brian; Joji; Murda Beatz; Keith Ape; Higher Brothers; Zion.T; Niki; Kohh; Laff Trax (Toro y Moi B2B Nosaj Thing); Dumbfoundead; August 08; Yung Pinch; Sen Morimoto; Don Krez; Diablo			
2019	August 17	88rising; Joji; Rich Brian; iKon; Niki; DPR Live; Higher Brothers; August 08; Dumbfoundead; Deb Never; ICINC (Arta, Devinta Trista, Moneva & Cellosux)	K?d; Manila Killa; Y2K; Park Hye Jin; Josh Pan; Qrion; Don Krez		
2021	November 6	Rich Brian; Illenium; CL; Saweetie; DPR Live + DPR Ian; Lil Cherry + Gold Buuda; Atarashii Gakko!	Japanese Breakfast; Umi; Stephanie Poetri; Elephante; Rei Ami; Audrey Nuna; Ylona Garcia		
2021	November 7	Joji; Niki; eaJ; Keshi; Feel Ghood Music (Tiger JK, Yoon Mi-rae, Bizzy & Bibi); Warren Hue; Luna Li	Beabadoobee; Guapdad 4000; Josh Pan; Seori; Wallice; The Linda Lindas; Mỹ Anh		
2022 (Pasadena)	August 20	Keshi (Note: Niki pulled out of the 2022 festival in Pasadena after testing positive for COVID-19 and was replaced by Keshi.); Yebi Labs (Joji DJ set); Jay Park; Kinjaz; Chungha; Dabin; Milli; Hojean	Mxmtoon; Yeek; Audrey Nuna + Deb Never; Thuy; boylife; Shotta Spence; 1nonly; DJ Triple XL	Club Year of Dance Tent: Camgirl; Hu Dat; B	
2022 (Pasadena)	August 21	Jackson Wang; Rich Brian; eaJ; Bibi; Warren Hue & Chasu; Atarashii Gakko!; Ylona Garcia	Teriyaki Boyz (Verbal, Ilmari, Ryo-Z & Wise); Raveena; Lastlings; Dumbfoundead; Stephanie Poetri; No Rome; DJ Co 1	Club Year of Dance Tent: Venessa Michaels; JackJack	
2022 (Jakarta)	December 3	Niki; Joji; (G)I-dle; Kaskade (special guest); Milli; Manila Grey; Stephanie Poetri; Zico	Atarashii Gakko!; Spence Lee; Yanqi Zhang; Ylona Garcia; Manja		
2022 (Jakarta)	December 4	Rich Brian; Jackson Wang; Yoasobi; Bibi; Veegee; Warren Hue; Chung Ha	Elephante; Voice of Baceprot; B.A.P; August 08; Ziyi Wang		
2022 (Manila)	December 9	Jinxzhou; Adawa; Zack Tabudlo; Stephanie Poetri; Manila Grey; Atarashii Gakko!; SB19; Manila Killa; Warren Hue; Milli; Yoasobi; Jessi; Rich Brian; Joji; Jackson Wang			
2022 (Manila)	December 10	DJ E-Man; Denise Julia; Spence Lee; Guapdad 4000; Akini Jing; Elephante; Ylona Garcia; August 08; Bibi; eaJ; Zedd (special guest); Niki			
2023 (New York City)	May 20	Fifi Zhang; Akini Jing; Warren Hue; Milli; Beabadoobee; Itzy; Rich Brian	Paravi; Spence Lee; Dumbfoundead; Hojean; ISOxo; Raveena		
2023 (New York City)	May 21	Loren; Masiwei; Dabin; XG; DPR Live and DPR Ian; Niki	Wolftyla; Veegee; P-Lo; Atarashii Gakko!; Yeek; Knock2		
2023 (Pasadena)	August 5	Warren Hue; Masiwei; Milli; Rina Sawayama; DPR Live and DPR Ian; Zedd; Rich Brian; Jackson Wang	DJ Triple XL; Fifi Zhang; Spence Lee; Stephanie Poetri; Akini Jing; Phum Viphurit; Dhruv; Keith Ape	Eternal Energy Dance Tent: B; Hu Dat; Josh Pan; Autograf; Tokimonsta	
2023 (Pasadena)	August 6	Loren; Atarashii Gakko!; Yerin Baek; Zion.T; XG; Yoasobi; Niki; Tiger JK, Yoon Mirae, Masiwei, KnowKnow, etc.	DJ E-Man; Sion; Voice of Baceprot; Zior Park; Lyn Lapid; Grentperez; Eyedress	Eternal Energy Dance Tent: Jackjack; Beauz; Sosupersam; Mr. Carmack	
2023 (Guangzhou)	September 23–24	Rich Brian; Higher Brothers (Masiwei, KnowKnow, Melo, Psy.P); Akini Jing; Hybs; Milli; Sha Yiting El; Warren Hue; Yanqi Xhang; Adawa; Cacien; Wang OK; Rainbow; Veegee; Young13dbaby; Zgodz			
2024	May 11	Wang OK; Young Posse; Balming Tiger; Juliet Ivy; Thuy; Dhruv; Wave to Earth; ILLENIUM b2b Dabin; (G)I-DLE			
2024	May 12	Spence Lee; Warren Hue; Awich; Deb Never; Lyn Lapid; Eyedress; Atarashii Gakko!; Bibi; Joji			
2025 (Guangzhou)	May 1	Higher Brothers (Masiwei, KnowKnow, Melo, Psy.P); Rich the Kid; Lil Ghost; Creepy Nuts; Fine; Jake Miller; Joyce; Steve Rocks			
2025 (Guangzhou)	May 2	Xin Liu; Rich Brian; AK Liu Zhang; Gali; Skai Isyourgod; Majiko; Sirup; Urchin MJ116; Warren Hue; Wolf Gang			
2025 (Pasadena)	May 31	DJ E-Man; Warren Hue; Xin Liu; Armnhmr; No Na; Porter Robinson; Rich Brian; Dean and Tabber; G-Dragon	Babebee; Seiji Oda; Karri; Miso; Wang OK; Stephanie Poetri; Bixby		
2025 (Pasadena)	June 1	B.; YY; Youha; Yung Kai; Number i; Milli; Higher Brothers; DPR Ian; 2NE1	Piscee; Jonah Love; Piao; DPR Cream & DPR Artic; 4Eve; Sunkis		
2026 (Tokyo)	March 28	Be First; Rich Brian; Max; Hana; KiiiKiii; Ayumu Imazu; No Na			
2026 (Tokyo)	March 29	Chanmina; Ai; Jay Park; Lngshot; Kvi Baba; Bibi; Milli			
2026 (Pasadena)	August 8	One Or Eight; Be First; Gia Fu; Warren Hue; No Na; KiiiKiii; Tiffany Day; Lngshot; Umi; Rich Brian; Dabin.kr; XG; Katseye		Toyota Music Den: Music Will x Danakadan; Ylona Garcia; Rhea Raj; Autograf; Tiffany Day	
