= Head in the Clouds II =

Compilation album by 88rising
- Released: October 11, 2019
- Recorded: 2019
- Length: 51:16
- Labels: 88rising; 12Tone
- Producers: Various: 1Mind; August 08; Rogét Chahayed; Taylor Dexter; Diamond Pistols; Don Krez; DVBBS; Flosstradamus; Gazzo; GKoop; Joji; JordanXL; Jonah Lenox; Major Lazer; Niko the Kid; Austin Ong; Stephanie Poetri; Jacob Ray; Jacob Reske; Rhyme So; Rich Brian; Wesley Singerman; Slanger; The Roommates; Isaac Valeens; Vic Wainstein; WYNNE

88rising chronology
Head in the Clouds (2018)	Head in the Clouds II (2019)

Singles from Head in the Clouds II
- 1. "Indigo" Released: August 13, 2019; 2. "Just Used Music Again" Released: September 4, 2019; 3. "Breathe" Released: September 12, 2019; 4. "These Nights" Released: October 3, 2019; 5. "Walking" Released: October 12, 2019

Head in the Clouds II is the second compilation album by musical collective 88rising. It was released through 88rising and 12Tone Music on October 11, 2019. Guest appearances include Chungha, Phum Viphurit, Generations from Exile Tribe, GoldLink, Jackson Wang, Swae Lee, Major Lazer, Rhyme So, and Barney Bones.

== Promotion ==
On August 17, 2019, 88rising held their "Head in the Clouds" festival for the second year in a row at the Los Angeles State Historic Park. Just three days prior, they released "Indigo" as the first single off their upcoming second iteration of the collaborative album. They announced that the creative design of the album would be led by Japanese sci-fi illustrator Hajime Sorayama and executive production of the album would be led by Joji.

On October 8, 2019, 88rising announced the full track listing with a short promotional video. Along with the track listing, features from artists such as GoldLink, Swae Lee, Generations from Exile Tribe and Major Lazer were mentioned.

== Track listing ==
Adapted from Apple Music.

No.	Title	Writer(s)	Producer(s)	Length
1.	"These Nights" (performed by Rich Brian and Chungha)	Montana Best; Brian Imanuel; Kim Chung-ha; Jordan Orvosh; McCulloch Sutphin	JordanXL; Slanger; 1Mind	3:43
2.	"Strange Land" (performed by Niki and Phum Viphurit)	Jacob Reske; Viphurit Siritip; Nicole Zefanya	Reske	2:55
3.	"Need Is Your Love" (performed by Joji and Generations from Exile Tribe)	Best; Ryota Katayose; Ryuto Kazuhara; Robert Mandell; George Miller; Reske; Sutphin	GKoop; 1Mind; Reske	2:38
4.	"Tequila Sunrise" (performed by Jackson Wang and Higher Brothers featuring August 08 and GoldLink)	Rory Andrew; D'Anthony Carlos; Stephen Feignbaum; Gregory Hein; Raymond Jacobs; Nathaniel Mann; Siwei Ma; Zhen Ding	August 08; WYNNE; Johan Lenox	4:03
5.	"Walking" (performed by Joji and Jackson Wang featuring Swae Lee and Major Lazer)	Best; Khalif Brown; Miller; Thomas Pentz; Wang	Major Lazer	2:47
6.	"Breathe" (performed by Joji and Don Krez)	Krez Caballero; Curt Cameruci; Christian Dold; Christopher van den Hoef; Miller; Omar Pineiro	Diamond Pistols; Don Krez; DVBBS; Flosstradamus	2:05
7.	"Shouldn't Couldn't Wouldn't" (performed by Niki and Rich Brian)	Imanuel; Alexander Saad; Zefanya	Gazzo; Niko the Kid	3:15
8.	"Just Used Music Again" (performed by Rhyme So)	Shinichi Osawa	Rhyme So	3:31
9.	"Indigo" (performed by Niki)	Rogét Chahayed; Taylor Dexter; Wesley Singerman; Zefanya	Chahayed; Dexter; Singerman	2:53
10.	"Hopscotch" (August 08 and Joji featuring Barney Bones and Rich Brian)	Imanuel; Jacobs; Miller; Maurice Powell	August 08	3:25
11.	"Calculator" (August 08 and Barney Bones)	Sam Homaee; Jacobs; Powell; Jonathan Wienner	August 08; The Roommates	2:57
12.	"La La Lost You" (performed by Niki)	Zefanya; Jacob Ray	Ray; Isaac Valeens	3:20
13.	"Hold Me Down" (performed by Higher Brothers)	Best; Junyi Yang; Ma; Sutphin; Yujie Xie; Ding	1Mind	3:43
14.	"I Love You 3000 II" (performed by Stephanie Poetri and Jackson Wang)	Poetri; Wang	Austin Ong; Poetri; Vic Wainstein	3:29
15.	"2 the Face" (performed by Rich Brian and Higher Brothers)	Best; Imanuel; Reske; Sutphin; Ding	1Mind; Reske	2:31
16.	"Gold Coast" (performed by Rich Brian)	Dold; Imanuel	Diamond Pistols; Rich Brian	4:01
Total length:				51:16

== Charts ==
Chart (2019)	Peak position
Australian Albums (ARIA)	30
Canadian Albums (Billboard)	47
US Billboard 200	79
