= No Na =

Indonesian girl group

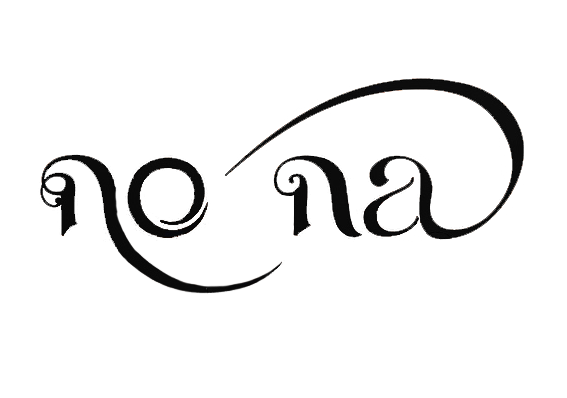

Background information
- Origin: Indonesia
- Genre: Pop
- Years active: 2025–present
- Label: 88rising
- Members: Christy Gardena; Esther Geraldine; Baila Fauri; Shazfa Adesya
- Website: nonawav.com

No Na (stylized in all lowercase) is an Indonesian girl group formed by and signed with 88rising, consisting of members Christy Gardena, Esther Geraldine, Baila Fauri, and Shazfa Adesya.

== Career ==
=== Pre-debut activities and formation ===
No Na is made up of members with dancing and singing backgrounds. Christy trained in professional ballet from a young age, as well as latin dance. In 2019, she competed at the International Dance Asia Competition in the Duo category; she finished as a second runner-up. Esther released her first recording at the age of 16. She competed in season 10 of Indonesian Idol in which she placed 17th. Her singles include "Rarity" and "Keep It Hush" (with Dipha Barus and Afgan). At the age of 13, Baila competed in the first season of Indonesian Idol Junior and came in sixth place. She gained further popularity through her covers on Instagram and YouTube, as well as releasing singles such as "Eye 2 Eye" and "3 Dots". Shazfa began performing with Australian K-pop cover dance crews while studying at University of New South Wales.

Christy, Baila, and Shazfa were scouted by 88rising after founder Sean Miyashiro and a project manager had seen their dance videos and song covers online. They all met for the first time at the Head in the Clouds Festival 2022 in Jakarta. Six months later, on Shazfa's recommendation, Esther joined the group. They started training in Jakarta before relocating to Los Angeles in 2024.

=== 2025–present ===
On April 29, 2025, 88rising announced that they would be debuting an Indonesian girl group, No Na, with members from Jakarta, Lombok, and Bali on May 2, 2025. The members were revealed individually from April 30 to May 1, 2025. The first member to be introduced was Esther, followed by Christy, Baila, and Shaz. The group's name is derived from the Indonesian word nona, which translates to "young lady" or "miss", reflecting their cultural roots.

On May 2, 2025, No Na released their debut single, "Shoot". The R&B-inspired pop track amassed millions of streams and helped the group rise to prominence. It was followed up by "Superstitious" and "Falling in Love".

On July 10, 2025, No Na released their debut extended play, Orchids (Lullabies). The EP consists of four solo tracks performed by the members and includes the previously shared "Bleach". They later released the singles "Sad Face :(" and "The One".

On September 18, 2026, No Na released their debut album, Island Girl, which was preceded by the singles "Work", "Rollerblade", and "Honk!".

On November 11, 2026, No Na was announced as part of the Coachella 2027 lineup, making them the first Indonesian group to perform at the festival.

== Other ventures ==
=== Endorsements ===
In July 2025, No Na was announced as part of Team Galaxy for Samsung Indonesia, becoming the faces of Galaxy Z Fold7 and Z Flip7. In August 2025, No Na and Rich Brian were featured in the collaboration campaign for 88rising and A Bathing Ape in celebration of the 10th anniversary of 88rising. In January 2026, No Na collaborated with Mobile Legends: Bang Bang to release a theme song for the M7 titled "Sizzle". In August 2026, No Na appeared in an advertising campaign for Nescafé Indonesia and Bank Central Asia.

== Members ==
- Christy Gardena
- Esther Geraldine
- Baila Fauri
- Shazfa "Shaz" Adesya

== Discography ==
=== Studio albums ===
List of studio albums with selected details
Title	Album details
Island Girl	Released: September 18, 2026; Label: 88rising

=== Extended plays ===
List of extended plays with selected details
Title	EP details
Orchids (Lullabies)	Released: July 10, 2025; Label: 88rising

=== Singles ===
List of singles, showing year released, selected chart positions, and album name
Title	Year	Peaks	Album
Title	Year	MYS	Album
"Shoot"	2025	—	Non-album singles
"Superstitious" / "Falling in Love"	2025	—	Non-album singles
"Sad Face :("	2025	—	Non-album singles
"The One"	2025	—	Non-album singles
"Work"	2026	—	Island Girl
"Rollerblade"	2026	12	Island Girl
"Honk!"	2026	—	Island Girl
"Speaker Freaker the Long Song"	2026	—	Non-album single
"Star"	2026	—	Island Girl
"—" denotes releases that did not chart or were not released in that region.

=== Promotional singles ===
List of promotional singles, showing year released and album name
Title	Year	Album
"Sizzle"	2026	Non-album single

== Videography ==
=== Music videos ===
List of music videos, showing year released and directors
Title	Year	Director(s)	Ref.
"Shoot"	2025	Aerin Moreno	
"Superstitious"	2025	Yasser Abubeker	
"Sad Face :("	2025	Alejandra Washington	
"The One"	2025	Alejandra Washington	
"Work"	2026	Fa and Fon	
"Rollerblade"	2026	Fa and Fon	
"Honk!"	2026	Michelle Hartawan and Kezia Aphelia	
"Star"	2026	Yasser Abubeker	

== Achievements ==
=== Awards and nominations ===
Year	Award	Category	Work	Result	Ref.
2026	Berlin Music Video Awards	Best Editor	"Work" (Note: Nominee: Charlie Von Rotberg)	Nominated	
2026	Anugerah Musik Indonesia	Best New Artist	"Rollerblade"	Won	
2026	Anugerah Musik Indonesia	Best Vocal Group Production	"Rollerblade"	Won	
2026	UK Music Video Awards	Best Choreography in a Video	"Work"	Nominated	
2026	BreakTudo Awards	Song by New International Artist	"Work"	Pending	

=== Listicles ===
Name of publisher, year listed, name of listicle, and placement
Publisher	Year	Listicle	Placement	Ref.
Shazam	2026	Fast Forward 2026: 65 Artists	Placed	
NME	2026	The NME 100: Essential Emerging Artists for 2026	Placed	
Forbes	2026	30 Under 30 Asia	Placed	
Tatler Asia	2026	Gen.T Leaders of Tomorrow	Placed	

== See also ==
- List of Indonesian musicians and musical groups
