= Head in the Clouds (album) =

Compilation album by 88rising
- Released: July 20, 2018
- Recorded: 2018
- Genre: R&B
- Length: 56:04
- Language: English; Chinese
- Label: 88rising; 12Tone
- Producer: Various: August 08; Barney Bones; BlocBoy JB; CashMoneyAP; Avalos Elmer; Falcons; Frank Dukes; Harikiri; HazeBanga; Akeel Henry; Bram Inscore; J Gramm; Joji; Murda Beatz; Niki; Phum Viphurit; Rich Brian; Roofeo; Karl Rubin; Southside; D'Anna Stewart; Jordan Ware; Y2K; Oren Yoel

88rising chronology
Head in the Clouds (2018)	Head in the Clouds II (2019)

Singles from Head in the Clouds
- 1. "Midsummer Madness" Released: June 7, 2018; 2. "Let It Go" Released: June 26, 2018; 3. "Warpaint" Released: June 28, 2018; 4. "Peach Jam" Released: July 17, 2018; 5. "History" Released: July 18, 2018

Head in the Clouds is a compilation album by musical collective 88rising. It was released through 88rising and 12Tone Music on July 20, 2018. Guest appearances include Yung Bans, Yung Pinch, 03 Greedo, BlocBoy JB, Vory, Phum Viphurit, Playboi Carti, Famous Dex, Verbal, GoldLink and Harikiri.

== Promotion and release ==
On May 7, 2018, Sean Miyashiro, the founder and CEO of the mass media company 88rising, announced their inaugural music festival called "Head in the Clouds" which would take place at the Los Angeles State Historic Park on September 22, 2018. With the announcement, the collective of artists under the label would also release a group album with the same name to accompany the festival.

On July 19, 2018, Joji and Rich Brian joined Sean Evans on First We Feast's Hot Ones to promote both the album and festival. They also partnered with First We Feast to create a cooking show based on their stay in Los Angeles titled Feast Mansion which premiered on 26 September 2018.

On July 24, 2018, August 8, Rich Brian, and Joji were guests on MTV's TRL and performed a live rendition of "Midsummer Madness".

Professional ratings
Review scores
Source	Rating
Clash	7/10
Highsnobiety	4.0/5.0 stars
Pitchfork	6.8/10

== Track listing ==
All credits adapted from Tidal.

Head in the Clouds
No.	Title	Writer(s)	Producer(s)	Length
1.	"La Cienega" (performed by Joji and Niki)	George Miller; Nicole Zefanya	Niki	3:12
2.	"Red Rubies" (performed by Don Krez, Yung Pinch, Higher Brothers, Yung Bans and Rich Brian)	Junyi Yang; Siwei Ma; Yujie Xie; Zhen Ding; Maurice Powell; Ari Starace; Blake Sandoval; Brian Soewarno; Vas Coleman; Krez Caballero	Y2K	4:03
3.	"Swimming Pool" (performed by Higher Brothers and 03 Greedo)	Yang; Ma; Xie; Ding; Alex Petit; Akeel Henry; Jason Jackson	CashMoneyAP; Henry	4:32
4.	"Peach Jam" (performed by Joji and BlocBoy JB)	Miller; James Baker; Oren Yoel	Joji; BlocboyJB; Yoel	2:41
5.	"Midsummer Madness" (performed by Joji, Rich Brian, Higher Brothers and August 08)	Soewarno; Powell; Miller; Ding; Ray Jacobs	August 08; Rich Brian	4:40
6.	"Plans" (performed by Niki and Vory)	Zefanya; Jahphet Landis; Karl Rubin; Tavoris Hollins Jr.	Roofeo; Rubin	2:18
7.	"History" (performed by Rich Brian)	Soewarno	Rich Brian	3:27
8.	"Lover Boy 88" (performed by Higher Brothers and Phum Viphurit)	Viphurit Siritip; Yang; Ma; Xie; Ding	Phum Viphurit	3:53
9.	"Poolside Manor" (performed by Niki and August 08)	D'Anna Stewart; Rashad Muhammad; Adam Feeney	Hazenbanga; Stewart; Frank Dukes	2:50
10.	"Beam" (performed by Rich Brian featuring Playboi Carti)	Soewarno; Jordan Carter; Shane Lindstrom; Joshua Luellen	Murda Beatz; Southside	2:31
11.	"Let It Go" (performed by Higher Brothers and BlocBoy JB)	Yang; Ma; Xie; Ding; Baker; Michael Oatman	Falcons	2:49
12.	"Disrespectin" (performed by Rich Brian, August 08 and Higher Brothers)	Yang; Ma; Xie; Ding; Soewarno; Oatman; Jared Lee	Falcons	3:50
13.	"Warpaint" (performed by Niki)	Bram Inscore; Ainslie Wills; Jessica Nitties	Inscore	3:33
14.	"I Want In" (performed by August 08 and Niki)	Zefanya; Monique Proctor	Niki	2:30
15.	"Japan 88" (performed by Keith Ape, Famous Dex and Verbal)	Dexter Gore Jr.; Julian Gramma; Lee Dong-heon; Ryu Young-ki	J Gramm	3:05
16.	"Nothing Wrong" (performed by Higher Brothers and Harikiri featuring GoldLink)	Yang; Ma; Xie; Ding; Andre Grant	Harikiri	3:12
17.	"Head in the Clouds" (performed by Joji)	Miller; Powell; Jordan Ware; Avalos Elmer	Joji; Ware; Elmer; Barney Bones	2:58
Total length:				56:04

== Charts ==
Chart (2018)	Peak position
Australian Albums (ARIA)	61
Canadian Albums (Billboard)	40
US Billboard 200	76
