= These Nights =

2019 single by Rich Brian and Chung Ha

Single by Rich Brian and Chung Ha

from the album Head in the Clouds II
- Released: October 3, 2019
- Recorded: 2019
- Length: 3:43
- Label: 88rising
- Songwriters: Chung Ha; Slanger; Montana Wayne Best; McCulloch Reid Sutphin; Jordan Orvosh; Rich Brian
- Producers: JordanXL; Slanger; 1Mind

Chung Ha singles chronology
"Fast" (2019)	"These Nights" (2019)	"Remedy" (2019)

Rich Brian singles chronology
"100 Degrees" (2019)	"These Nights" (2019)	"Titanic" (2019)

Music video
- "These Nights" on YouTube

"These Nights" is a collaboration single by Indonesian rapper Rich Brian and South Korean singer Chung Ha released on October 3, 2019, by 88rising. The track serves as one of the lead singles in 88rising's compilation album, Head in the Clouds II, released on October 11, 2019 through 88rising Records and 12Tone Music.

== Background and music ==
Music and photo teasers for the song were released in the weeks prior to the official release of the single. The track was written by Chung Ha, Slanger, Montana Wayne Best, McCulloch Reid Sutphin, Jordan Orvosh and Rich Brian.

Musically, "These Nights" is a sophisticated track with an old-school style that features a memorable synthesizer sound. It has been described as a song about existing for the nighttime and seizing the memorable moments one can make with their lover. The song serves as a stark difference to Brian’s debut song, "Dat $tick" (2016) and includes passionate modulated crooning rather than a harsh anti-authoritative attitude.

== Music video ==
The single was released through a hypnotizing music video that features the pair as they speed along a motorcycle, dancing together. Filmed in Indonesia, it also shows Rich Brian rocking a bold mullet while holding an '80s-style brick phone. As Rich Brian comically locks eyes with the camera, the scene then transits to one where Chung Ha and him are riding a motorcycle into the night.

== Release history ==
Release dates and formats for "These Nights"
Region	Date	Format	Label
Various	October 3, 2019	Digital download, streaming	88rising Records
