= Jaeson Ma =

American entrepreneur and media executive (born 1980)

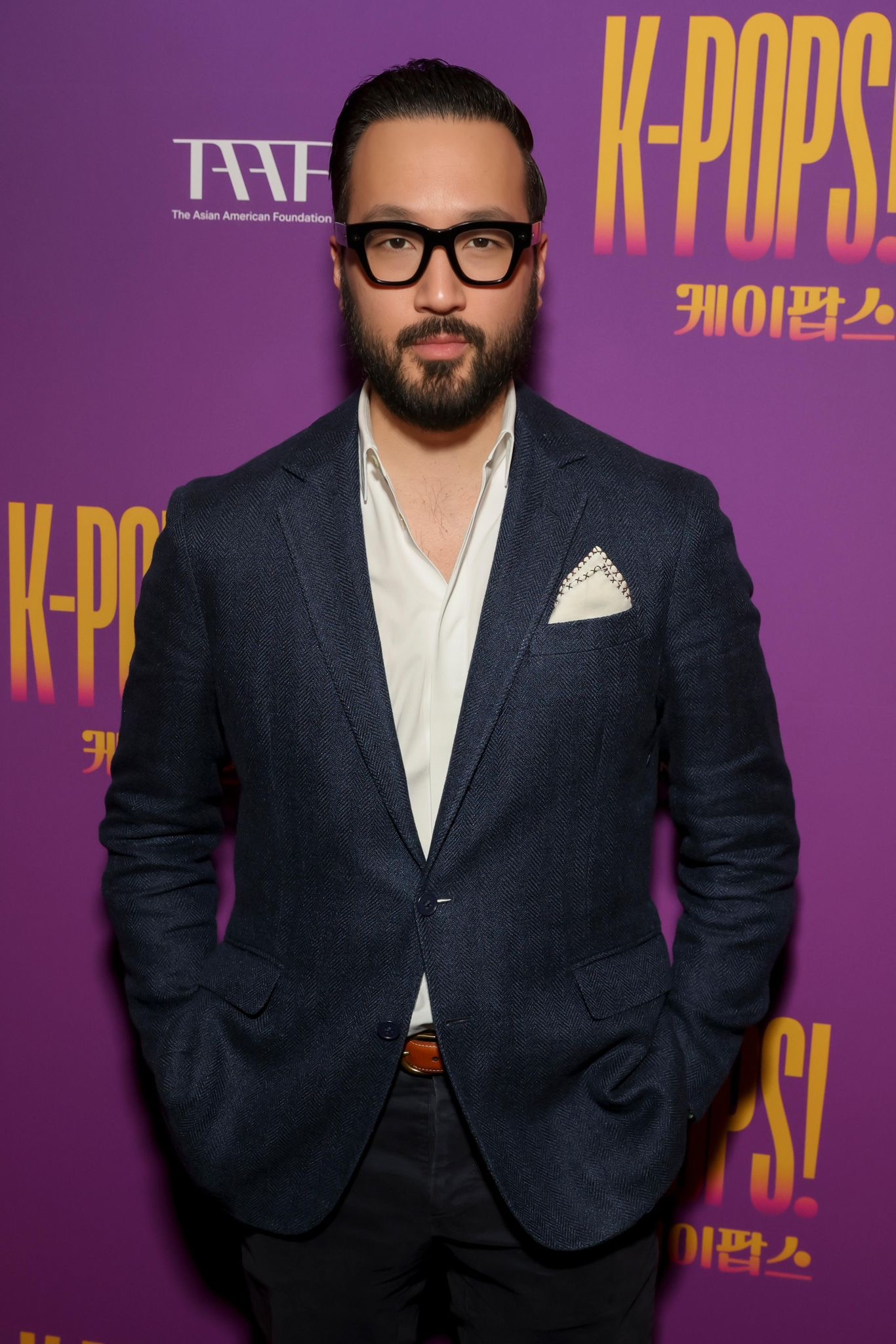
- Born: Jason Cheng Yuen Ma; November 11, 1980 (age 45); Lubbock, Texas, U.S.
- Education: William Jessup University (BA); Fuller Theological Seminary (MA)
- Occupations: Entrepreneur, media executive, and venture capitalist
- Known for: Co-founder of 88rising, Stampede Ventures, and EST Media Holdings
- Relatives: Frederick Ma (uncle)

Jaeson Ma (simplified Chinese: 马正远; traditional Chinese: 馬正遠; pinyin: Mǎ Zhèngyuǎn; born Jason Cheng Yuen Ma; November 11, 1980) is an American entrepreneur, media executive, and venture capitalist. He is the founder of East West Ventures and co-founder of the media companies 88rising, Stampede Ventures, and EST Media Holdings.

== Early life and education ==
Ma was born in Lubbock, Texas, and was raised by a single mother in San Jose, California and the wider San Francisco Bay Area.

Ma earned degrees in biblical studies, business management, and youth ministry from William Jessup University. He later received a Master of Arts in global leadership and intercultural studies from Fuller Theological Seminary.

== Career ==
In 2012, Ma founded East West Ventures (formerly East West Artists), an investment and talent management firm focusing on the media and technology sectors. In 2015, Ma co-founded the Asian-focused multimedia company 88rising alongside Sean Miyashiro. He served as the company's chairman, leading its early capital raises, which included a 2017 strategic investment from the multinational communications company WPP.

Ma co-founded Stampede Ventures, a film and television production studio, in 2017 with former Warner Bros. executive Greg Silverman. The company's feature film productions include Ordinary Angels (2024), Space Cadet (2024), and K-Pops! (2025), the directorial debut of Anderson .Paak. In October 2023, Stampede Ventures signed a $350 million, 10-picture production partnership with the Saudi Arabian film agency Film AlUla. In 2020, Stampede signed a first-look deal with CBS Studios.

In 2020, Ma co-founded EST Media Holdings, which operates EST Studios and the digital platform Eastern Standard Times. The company focuses on producing and distributing Asian-targeted film and television content. Ma was a strategic advisor and financier for the social video app Triller, where he helped broker the 2020 Mike Tyson vs. Roy Jones Jr. exhibition boxing match.

In 2025, Ma launched OpenWav, a direct-to-fan music and commerce platform, with musician Wyclef Jean serving as Chief Music Officer. The company's projects include a producer competition partnered with Scott Storch and the Netflix film K-Pop Demon Hunters featuring Kevin Woo. The following year, the company launched the OpenWav Artist Bank, an independent artist financing platform.

Ma is a Venture Partner at Goodwater Capital, a consumer technology fund, and serves as a General Partner at CAA Caravan Digital Studios. He is also an investor through Aurelius Capital. Through East West Ventures and other investment vehicles, his portfolio includes Anthropic, Apptronik, xAI, Coinbase, Grab, XPeng, and Dark Horse Comics. His investments via Goodwater Capital include TikTok (formerly Musical.ly), b.stage, and Brain.ai, while his investments with Aurelius Capital include Outpost Space and Majestic Labs.

== Ministry and music ==
Ma was ordained as a Christian minister in 2004. Drawing on his time as a campus minister, he authored the book The Blueprint: A Revolutionary Plan to Plant Missional Communities on Campus in 2007.

His music career includes the 2010 album Glory, which featured the single "Love" with Bruno Mars; Ma recorded the track with Mars prior to the latter's mainstream breakthrough. He also recorded an unreleased album titled Revival or Riot, which was produced by Mase.

== Recognition ==
Ma was named to the Variety 500 list of influential media leaders in 2022, 2023, and 2024. He is also a member of the Milken Institute Young Leaders Circle. In 2020, he was named to Tatler Asia's Gen.T "Leaders of Tomorrow" list. In 2014, he was included in Christianity Today's "33 Under 33" list of leaders influencing the future of the church.

== Selected discography ==
- 2 Sides 2 Everything (1998 mixtape)
- Glory (2010)
- Revival or Riot (Unreleased)

== Selected filmography ==
- Ordinary Angels (2024) – Executive producer
- Space Cadet (2024) – Executive producer
- K-Pops! (2025) – Executive producer
