= Shang-Chi (disambiguation) =

Shang-Chi is a Marvel Comics character.

Shang-Chi may also refer to:

- Shang-Chi and the Legend of the Ten Rings, a 2021 superhero film based on the character
  - Shang-Chi and the Legend of the Ten Rings (soundtrack), 2021 film soundtrack
- Shang-Chi (Marvel Cinematic Universe), the Marvel Cinematic Universe adaptation of the character
