= Midsummer Madness (song) =

2018 single by 88rising

Single by 88rising featuring Joji, Rich Brian, Higher Brothers and August 08

from the album Head in the Clouds
- Released: 7 June 2018
- Genre: R&B; hip-hop
- Length: 4:40
- Label: 88rising; 12Tone
- Songwriters: Brian Soewarno; George Miller; Maurice Powell; Ray Jacobs; Zhen Ding
- Producers: August 08; Rich Brian

88rising singles chronology
"Midsummer Madness" (2018)	"Peach Jam" (2018)

Music video
- "Midsummer Madness" on YouTube

"Midsummer Madness" is a song by musical collective 88rising, featuring Japanese singer Joji, Indonesian rapper Rich Brian, Chinese hip-hop group Higher Brothers, and American singer August 08. The single was released on 7 June 2018 by 88rising Records and 12Tone Music Group as the debut single from their album, Head in the Clouds.

== Music video ==
A music video for the song was released the same day. Directed by Warwick Saint, the video depicts the 88rising collective dancing at a party while at the same time, videos of the collective, either at the beach or during their time on tour, is shown to exhibit highlights of the groups time together.

== Remixes ==
A remix of the song by Krane was released as a single on 25 September 2018.

Another remix was released by Danny Ocean as a single on August 14, 2020, entitled, "Midsummer Madness 20".

== Charts ==
Chart (2018)	Peak position
US Hot R&B Songs (Billboard)	23

== Certifications ==
Region	Certification	Certified units/sales
New Zealand (RMNZ)	Gold	15,000^{‡}
United States (RIAA)	Platinum	1,000,000^{‡}
^{‡} Sales+streaming figures based on certification alone.
