= Bank roll =

Bank roll can refer to one of these following concepts:

- Coin wrapper
- A level from the video game Duke Nukem 3D

It may also refer to:

- Bankroll Fresh (born 1987), American rapper from Atlanta, Georgia
- Bankroll Mafia, American hip hop collective from Atlanta, Georgia
- "Bankroll Mafia" (album), eponymously titled debut studio album
- "Bankroll.", a song by American DJ Diplo

== See also ==
- Payroll
