= Amen (Rich Brian album) =

Studio album by Rich Brian
- Released: 2 February 2018
- Recorded: 2016–2017
- Genres: Hip-hop, Pop Rap, Trap, Cloud Rap
- Length: 44:03
- Labels: 88rising; Empire
- Producers: Rich Brian; Austin Powerz; Bkorn; NIKI; Rogét Chahayed; Channel Tres; Joshua Crosby; Cubeatz; J Hill; Frans Mernick; Wesley Singerman

Rich Brian chronology
Amen (2018)	The Sailor (2019)

Singles from Amen
- 1. "Glow Like Dat" Released: 15 August 2017; 2. "Chaos" Released: 5 October 2017; 3. "See Me" Released: 8 January 2018

Amen is the debut studio album by Indonesian rapper Rich Brian. It was released on 2 February 2018, by 88rising and Empire. It is the debut commercial project by Rich Brian after releasing a string of non-album singles since 2016, such as "Dat Stick". The album was primarily produced by Rich Brian, alongside Bkorn, Cubeatz, Frans Mernick, Austin Powerz, Rogét Chahayed and Wesley Singerman and features guest appearances from Offset, Joji, Niki and August 08.

== Background ==
On 26 May 2017, Rich Brian was featured in an interview with XXL about his artistic transition, by stating,

"This project that I'm working on, I think it's going to be an introduction to a more serious rap. There's still going to be funny stuff. When you listen to it, you might still laugh and stuff, that's cool. That's what I'm going for too. But it's not a joke. When people listen to it, they're going to be like, 'It's that real shit."

On 19 December 2017, Brian announced the album's title, alongside the reveal of the cover art. On 29 January 2018, he unveiled the album's tracklist.

== Promotion ==
=== Singles ===
The album's lead single, "Glow Like Dat" was released for streaming and digital download, alongside its music video on 15 August 2017.

The album's second single, "Chaos" was released on 5 October 2017.

The album's third single, "See Me" was released on 1 January 2018.

=== Other songs ===
The non-album single, "Crisis" was released on 10 November 2017. The song features a guest appearance from British rapper 21 Savage.

The collaborative single with Kris Wu and Joji, "18" featuring Trippie Redd and Baauer, was released on 16 January 2018.

== Critical reception ==
Professional ratings
Aggregate scores
Source	Rating
Metacritic	68/100
Review scores
Source	Rating
Exclaim!	4/10
The Guardian	4/5 stars
Highsnobiety	4/5 stars
HipHopDX	3.6/5
Pitchfork	5.9/10

Amen garnered a generally positive reception from critics. At Metacritic, which assigns a normalized rating out of 100 to reviews from mainstream critics, the album received an average score of 68 based on 6 reviews, indicating "generally favorable reviews". Ben Beaumont-Thomas of The Guardian gave Amen a positive review, stating: "His neo-G-funk backings – synthscapes in pink neon with weed smoke drifting across them – are admirably lush and melancholic, but his flow is his greatest skill of all, deadpan patter that rattles out like ticker tape." Scott Glaysher of HipHopDX commended the content of the album in comparison to Brian's previous work, also commending the production: "The kaleidoscope of production is freshly tailored to Brian's equally mixing moods with trap drums helping the crypto flexes and somber keys leading the way for the emo-pop ballads. It's the exact musical buffet that the majority of 18-year-olds would eat up 2018. Rich Brian's attempt at honesty throughout the album forebodes critics from outright clowning him while the beats are definitely catchy enough to keep his live shows rocking like a pulpit. As long Rich Brian remains in the driver seat and Rich Chigga in the trunk, Brian Immanuel's future will bright."

Sheldon Pearce of Pitchfork stated that "the debut from Rich Brian has the fun, wit, and snark of a choice tweet but lacks the essential qualities of a solid well-made rap album", criticising the album's lyricism: "But there is very little happening within his verses right now, and even as he's pivoted toward the personal, he's still doing impressions, sonically and stylistically."

Exclaim! stated that "Rich Brian's full-length debut isn't good in any typical sense, which shouldn't shock anyone."

== Commercial performance ==
In the United States, initial projections for the first week sales were between 19,000 and 22,000 album-equivalent units.

== Track listing ==
All tracks written and produced by Rich Brian, except where noted.

Amen track listing
No.	Title	Writer(s)	Producer(s)	Length
1.	"Amen"			1:56
2.	"Cold"			3:48
3.	"Occupied"			2:41
4.	"Introvert" (featuring Joji)	Brian Imanuel; George Miller		3:42
5.	"Attention" (featuring Offset)	Imanuel; Kiari Cephus; Austin Schindler; Brandon Korn; Kevin Gomringer; Tim Gomringer	Austin Powerz; Bkorn; Rich Brian; Cubeatz	2:50
6.	"Glow Like Dat"			3:30
7.	"Trespass"			2:59
8.	"Flight"	Imanuel; Frans Mernick; Rogét Chahayed; Wesley Singerman; Ray Jacobs	Mernick; Chahayed; Singerman; Rich Brian	2:57
9.	"See Me"			3:32
10.	"Enemies"			3:27
11.	"Kitty"	Imanuel; Benabe Cesar Peralta	Origami	2:45
12.	"Little Prince" (featuring Niki)	Imanuel; Nicole Zefanya		2:52
13.	"Chaos"			2:12
14.	"Arizona" (featuring August 08)	Imanuel; Joseph Hill, Jr.; Joshua Crosby; Sheldon Young; Ray Jacobs; Jared Lee	J Hill; Crosby; Channel Tres; Rich Brian	4:52
Total length:				44:09

== Charts ==
Chart performance for Amen
Chart (2018)	Peak position
Australian Albums (ARIA)	27
Belgian Albums (Ultratop Flanders)	108
Canadian Albums (Billboard)	18
Dutch Albums (Album Top 100)	61
New Zealand Albums (RMNZ)	30
UK Albums (Official Charts)	87
US Billboard 200	18
