= Run It (DJ Snake song) =

2021 song by DJ Snake featuring Rick Ross and Rich Brian

Single by DJ Snake featuring Rick Ross and Rich Brian

from the album Shang-Chi and the Legend of the Ten Rings: The Album
- Released: 13 August 2021
- Genre: EDM; hip-hop; phonk
- Length: 2:43
- Label: Hollywood; Marvel Music; Interscope
- Songwriters: Brian Imanuel; Christian Dold; DJ Snake; Marvel Comics; Rick Ross; SIM
- Producers: DJ Snake; SIM; Diamond Pistols

DJ Snake singles chronology
"You Are My High" (2021)	"Run It" (2021)	"Pondicherry" (2021)

Rick Ross singles chronology
"Make Me Feel" (2020)	"Run It" (2021)	"Outlawz" (2021)

Rich Brian singles chronology
"Lazy Susan" (2021)	"Run It" (2021)	"New Tooth" (2021)

Music video
- "Run It" on YouTube

"Run It" is a song by French DJ and record producer DJ Snake featuring American rapper Rick Ross and Indonesian rapper Rich Brian. It was released by Hollywood Records, Marvel Music, and Interscope Records on 13 August 2021, from the soundtrack of the Marvel Studios film Shang-Chi and the Legend of the Ten Rings, which premiered on 3 September 2021.

== Composition ==
Jack Spilsbury of We Rave You wrote that, the song "featuring heavy and power synths and incredible vocals and rapping from Rick Ross and Rich Brian". It is written in the key of D major, with a tempo of 104 beats per minute.

== Critical reception ==
Brian Bonavoglia of DJ Times described the track "as an exhilarating anthem that sees the worlds of hip-hop and menacing mid-tempo combine into one making for one adrenaline-pumping listening experience". Jason Heffler of EDM.com commented that "Run It" as "a heart-racing banger fit for the suspenseful action sequences of a tentpole Marvel film".

== Music video ==
The music video was released on 14 September 2021, which appeared in the film Shang-Chi and the official soundtrack, and also starred the film's lead actor, Simu Liu. It showcases Liu "battle it out on the dance floor with the DJ Snake".

== Credits and personnel ==
Credits adapted from AllMusic.

- Diamond Pistols – producer
- DJ Snake – composer, engineer, mixing, primary artist, producer, programming
- Christian Dold – composer
- Mercer – engineer, mixing
- Rich Brian – composer, primary artist, vocals
- Rick Ross – composer, primary artist, vocals
- SIM – composer, producer

== Uses ==
ESPN announced that the song was used in the background music for the 2021-22 college football season and serve as the anthem for the coverage, which started on 28 August.

== Charts ==
=== Weekly charts ===
Weekly chart performance for "Run It"
Chart (2021)	Peak position
US Hot Dance/Electronic Songs (Billboard)	13

=== Year-end charts ===
Year-end chart performance for "Run It"
Chart (2021)	Position
US Hot Dance/Electronic Songs (Billboard)	71
