= Five Stars (Higher Brothers album) =

Studio album by Higher Brothers
- Released: 22 February 2019
- Genre: Chinese hip-hop; trap
- Label: 88rising; 12Tone
- Producer: Bēkon; Blasian Beats; Cookin' Soul; Don Krez; FrancisGotHeat; Harikiri; Joji; K Swisha; Luca; Poloboy 81; Richie Souf; Ronny J; Snapz; The Donuts; Trebol Beats; Will Major; Wynter

Higher Brothers chronology
Type-3 (with Harikiri) (2018)	Five Stars (2019)

Five Stars is the second album by Chinese hip-hop group Higher Brothers, released on 22 February 2019 through 88rising and 12Tone Music. The album was announced on 8 February 2019 and features American rappers ScHoolboy Q, Soulja Boy and JID among others. It was their first album to be recorded in a professional studio. The artists have stated that the album's title comes from the five stars on the Chinese flag as well as high quality "five star" rapping.

== Track listing ==
Track list adapted from Tidal.

Five Stars
No.	Title	Writer(s)	Producer(s)	Length
1.	"16 Hours"	Junyi Yang; Siwei Ma; Yujie Xie; Zhen Ding; David Garcia	Cookin' Soul	2:52
2.	"Open It Up"	Yang; Ma; Xie; Ding; Luca Polizzi	Luca	4:36
3.	"Flexing So Hard"	Yang; Ma; Xie; Ding; Lana Larkin; Karl Hamnqvist	K Swisha	2:55
4.	"One Punch Man" (featuring Ski Mask the Slump God and Denzel Curry)	Yang; Ma; Xie; Ding; Stokeley Goulbourne; Curry; Ronald Spence	Ronny J	3:21
5.	"Do It Like Me" (featuring JID)	Yang; Xie; Destin Route; Tyler Mehlenbacher; Craig Balmoris; Sergiu Gherman; Daniel Tannenbaum	Bēkon; The Donuts	2:38
6.	"Top" (featuring Soulja Boy)	Yang; Ma; Xie; Ding; DeAndre Way; William Gaskins; Niles Groce; Nicholas Varvatsoulis; Mathius Herman	Snapz; Will Major; Blasian Beats	3:54
7.	"Sunshine"	Yang; Xie; Diego Gómez	Trebol Beats	2:26
8.	"We Talkin Bout" (featuring Kohh)	Yang; Ma; Yuki Chiba; Krez Caballero	Don Krez	4:13
9.	"Gong Xi Fa Cai"	Yang; Ma; Xie; Ding; Tony Son	Richie Souf	2:54
10.	"Won't Believe" (featuring Schoolboy Q)	Ma; Ding; Quincy Hanley; Ewan Mcclain	Poloboy 81	3:35
11.	"Need Me Now" (featuring Guapdad 4000)	Ma; Ding; Akeem Hayes; Jeffrey Newlin	Wynter	4:10
12.	"Diamond"	Ma; Ding; Andre Grant	Harikiri	3:12
13.	"No More" (featuring Niki)	Ma; Ding; Nicole Zefanya; Francis NguyenTran	FrancisGotHeat	3:50
14.	"Zombie" (featuring Rich Brian)	Yang; Ma; Xie; Ding; Brian Imanuel; George Miller	Joji	3:51
