= Where Is My Head? =

Studio album by Rich Brian
- Released: 15 August 2025
- Genres: Hip-hop, Alternative R&B, Neo-Soul, Pop-Rap
- Length: 47:40
- Label: 88rising
- Producers: Brian Imanuel; Jacob Ray; Andrés Rebellón; Hoskins; Kurtis Wells

Rich Brian chronology
Brightside (2022)	Where Is My Head? (2025)

Singles from Where Is My Head?
- 1. "Little Ray Of Light" Released: 14 March 2025; 2. "Butterfly" Released: 25 April 2025; 3. "Jumpy" Released: 23 May 2025; 4. "Oh Well" Released: 27 June 2025

Where Is My Head? is the third studio album by Indonesian rapper Rich Brian, released on 15 August 2025 via 88rising. The project was announced, alongside a promotional video, on 6 March 2025. The album was preceded by the 2025 singles "Little Ray Of Light," "Butterfly," "Jumpy," and "Oh Well." It is Brian's first full-length album since The Sailor in 2019 and the first to be released under just 88rising and not along with 12Tone Music. The album features guest appearances from Toro y Moi, Ski Mask the Slump God, Maxo Kream, Redveil, Charlotte Day Wilson, Daisy World, and Kurtis Wells. The entire album was primarily produced by Brian himself with additional help from Andres Rebellón and Hoskins.

The album was announced on March 6, 2025, and originally slated for release on May 23, 2025, before getting delayed due to track listing reassessment, which led to additional promotional singles "Jumpy" and "Oh Well" being released.

The album failed to chart on any major or known commercial record charts, making it the first of Brian's full-length albums to do so.

== Track listing ==
All tracks written and produced by Brian Imanuel, except where noted.

Where Is My Head? track listing
No.	Title	Writer(s)	Producer(s)	Length
1.	"Senja"	Brian Imanuel; Andrés Rebellón; Jacob Ray; Fariz RM^{[b]}; Iman R.N.^{[b]}; Mark McKenna	Imanuel; Rebellón; Ray; McKenna^{[a]}	2:35
2.	"Body High" (featuring Toro y Moi)			3:19
3.	"Jumpy" (featuring Ski Mask the Slump God)	Imanuel; Stokeley Clevon Goulbourne		2:36
4.	"Took A Breath"	Imanuel; Andre Wollrabe; Rook Monroe		3:05
5.	"Butterfly"			3:05
6.	"Fat Cats, Starving Dogs" (featuring Maxo Kream)	Imanuel; Emekwanem Ogugua Biosah Jr.; Jacob Ray; Taylor Dexter; Wesley Singerman	Imanuel; Ray^{[a]}; Dexter^{[a]}; Singerman^{[a]}	2:15
7.	"Little Ray Of Light"		Imanuel; Rebellón^{[a]}; Pedro Martins^{[a]}; Johnny May^{[a]}	3:00
8.	"Ma"		Imanuel; May^{[a]}	3:10
9.	"Serpents!"			2:31
10.	"Bumpy Road" (featuring Redveil)	Imanuel; Marcus Morton		3:09
11.	"Timezones"			6:34
12.	"Is It?" (featuring Charlotte Day Wilson & Daisy World)	Imanuel; Rebellón; Charlotte Elene Day Wilson; Daisy Hamel-Bufa; Jonathan Joseph Hoskins	Imanuel; Rebellón; Hoskins	4:10
13.	"She" (featuring Kurtis Wells)	Imanuel; Wells	Imanuel; Wells	2:51
14.	"Oh Well"		Imanuel; Martins^{[a]}	3:25
15.	"Jelly Air Island"			1:54
Total length:				47:40

=== Notes ===
- ^{^[a]} indicates an additional producer.
- ^{^[b]} "Senja" contains a sample of "Cakrawala Senja" written by Fariz RM and Iman R.N. as performed by Keegan Nasution.

== Personnel ==
- Rich Brian – vocals (all tracks), recording (all tracks)
- Toro y Moi – vocals (2), recording (2)
- Ski Mask the Slump God – vocals (3)
- Daisy World – background vocals (4, 8, 10, 14), vocals (12)
- V.C.R. – background vocals (4)
- Maxo Kream – vocals (6)
- Redveil – vocals (10), recording (10)
- Charlotte Day Wilson – vocals (12), recording (12)
- Kurtis Wells – vocals (13), recording (13)
- Ivan Gojaya – background vocals (15), mixing (15), mastering (15), additional mixing (6, 8-12, 14)
- Augustin Oendari – background vocals (15)
- Mike Bozzi – mastering (1–14)
- Neal H Pogue – mixing (1–14)
- Victor Pereyra – recording (3)
- Chris Kasych – recording (12)
- James Kirk – recording (12)
