= The Sailor (Rich Brian album) =

Studio album by Rich Brian
- Released: 26 July 2019
- Genres: Hip Hop, Pop Rap, Alternative R&B, Baroque Pop
- Length: 44:00
- Labels: 88rising; 12Tone
- Producers: 1Mind; Craig Balmoris; Bekon; Diamond Pistols; The Donuts; Eské; Frank Dukes; Kid Culture; Komari; Stelios Phili; Reske; Rich Brian; Teddy Sinclair; Trophy's

Rich Brian chronology
Amen (2018)	The Sailor (2019)	1999 (2020)

Singles from The Sailor
- 1. "Yellow" Released: 26 June 2019; 2. "Kids" Released: 17 July 2019

Professional ratings
Review scores
Source	Rating
AllMusic	3.5/5 stars
Exclaim!	8/10
Pitchfork	6.8/10
RapReviews	7.5/10

The Sailor is the second studio album by Indonesian rapper Rich Brian. It was released on 26 July 2019, through 88rising and 12Tone Music and it served as the follow-up to his debut studio album Amen. The album was primarily produced by Bekon and The Donuts, alongside Rich Brian with production contributions by Teddy Sinclair, among others and features guest appearances from RZA and Joji.

== Background ==
On 18 June 2019, Rich Brian announced the lead single from the album "Yellow" through his social media accounts. The song and its accompanying music video was released on 26 June 2019, with the video revealing a new album from Brian was to be expected on 26 July 2019. Days prior to the release of the album, Brian released snippets for the tracks "The Sailor" and "Rapapapa".

In an interview with Complex about the album and how it was different from his last project, Amen, Brian said:

The biggest change is the writing has improved a lot. I realized on this album that I can literally title it anything. When I was making it, I was still kind of learning about writing and still trying to find my style. And I wasn't really sure, like, 'OK, what can I write about?' I truly thought you can run out of things to talk about, but you actually cannot. You can literally talk about anything. It's just a matter of how things are worded. On this album, I am writing about things that are really, really personal to me. I am just trying to be as vulnerable as possible. Production-wise, too, I'm collaborating a lot more versus me doing it all by myself. On this album, I'm learning to let things go a little bit, while not sacrificing my creative freedom.

== Promotion ==
The album's lead single, "Yellow" was released on 26 June 2019, along with an accompanied music video and features vocals from singer and producer Bekon. The music video was directed by Dave Meyers.

The album's second single, "Kids" was released on 17 July 2019, with a music video being released 2 days later. The music video was directed by Sing J. Lee.

Following the release of the album, Brian released a short film titled, Rich Brian is The Sailor, on 30 July 2019, which was written and directed by Sing J. Lee.

He also teamed up with Spotify and his label 88rising to present an exhibition for his new album called "The Sailor Experience" and was held in his hometown Jakarta, Indonesia, 8–10 August 2019.

== Track listing ==
The Sailor track listing
No.	Title	Writer(s)	Producer(s)	Length
1.	"The Sailor"	Brian Imanuel; Tyler Reese Mehlenbacher; Sergiu Gherman; Daniel Tannenbaum; Daniel Krieger; Craig Balmoris	Bekon; The Donuts	3:41
2.	"Rapapapa" (featuring RZA)	Imanuel; Balmoris; Krieger; Tannenbaum; Gregory Hein; Robert Diggs; Gherman; Mehlenbacher	Bekon; The Donuts	4:07
3.	"Yellow" (featuring Bekon)	Imanuel; Balmoris; Krieger; Tannenbaum; Hein; Sean Miyashiro; Gherman; Mehlenbacher	Bekon; The Donuts	4:51
4.	"Kids"	Adam Feeney; Imanuel; Balmoris; Krieger; Tannenbaum; Miyashiro; Gherman; Mehlenbacher	Bekon; Rich Brian; Balmoris; Frank Dukes; The Donuts	4:30
5.	"Drive Safe"	Imanuel; Christian Dold; Balmoris; Krieger; Tannenbaum; Gherman; Mehlenbacher; August Grant; Maurice Powell	Bekon; Rich Brian; Diamond Pistols; The Donuts	4:00
6.	"Confetti"	Imanuel; Balmoris; Krieger; Tannenbaum; Gherman; Mehlenbacher	Bekon; Balmoris; The Donuts; Rich Brian	2:52
7.	"Vacant"	Imanuel; Balmoris; Krieger; Tannenbaum; Melissa Lingafelt; Gherman; Mehlenbacher	Bekon; Balmoris; The Donuts; Rich Brian	2:33
8.	"No Worries"	Imanuel; Balmoris; Krieger; Tannenbaum; Hein; Gherman; Mehlenbacher	Rich Brian; Bekon^{[a]}; The Donuts^{[a]}	2:43
9.	"100 Degrees"	Imanuel; Daniel Hackett; McCulloch Sutphin; Montana Best; Grant	Rich Brian; 1Mind; Kid Culture; Bekon^{[a]}; The Donuts^{[a]}	2:46
10.	"Slow Down Turbo"	Imanuel; Tannenbaum; Komari Bailey; Sarkis Khaioian; Seth van Genabeek; Stelios Phili; Natalia Sinclair; Balmoris; Andrei Dan; Dylan Chambers; Hein; Jacob Reske; Best; Noel Zancanella; Gherman; Mehlenbacher	Rich Brian; Bekon; Teddy Sinclair; The Donuts; Eské	4:00
11.	"Curious"	Imanuel; Balmoris; Krieger; Tannenbaum; Gherman; Mehlenbacher	Bekon; Balmoris; The Donuts; Chakra^{[a]}	3:45
12.	"Where Does the Time Go" (featuring Joji)	Imanuel; Balmoris; Krieger; Tannenbaum; George Miller; Gherman; Mehlenbacher	Bekon; The Donuts; Rich Brian	4:11
Total length:				44:00

=== Note ===
- ^{^[a]}indicates an additional producer

== Personnel ==
Credits adapted from Tidal.

- Rich Brian – vocals
- Jaycen Joshua – mixing (1, 2, 4, 6, 7, 9)
- Erik Madrid – mixing (1, 3, 5, 8, 10–12)
- Matt Anthony – engineering (1–3, 5–8, 10, 12), recording (6-8, 10, 12), additional mixing (1–3, 5–8, 10, 12)
- Chris Athens – mastering
- Nate Eaton – recording (1, 3, 4, 9, 11), engineering (1, 2, 11)
- Juan Peña – engineering (1, 2, 4, 9, 11), recording (3, 11)
- Vic Wainstein – recording (1, 2, 6, 8–12)
- Christian Dold – recording (1, 5, 7)
- Bekon – background vocals (1)
- Gregory Hein – recording (3, 8)
- James Royo – recording (5)
- Franciso Ramirez - recording (12)
- DJ Riggins – mixing assistance (1, 2, 4, 6, 7, 9)
- Jacob Richards – mixing assistance (1, 2, 4, 6, 7, 9)
- Mike Seaberg – mixing assistance (1, 2, 4, 6, 7, 9)

== Charts ==
Chart performance for The Sailor
Chart (2019)	Peak position
Australian Albums (ARIA)	77
Canadian Albums (Billboard)	74
Dutch Albums (Album Top 100)	89
New Zealand Albums (RMNZ)	27
US Billboard 200	62
US Independent Albums (Billboard)	12
US Top R&B/Hip-Hop Albums (Billboard)	31
