= Brightside (EP) =

EP by Rich Brian
- Released: 20 January 2022
- Genre: Hip-hop
- Length: 12:41
- Label: 88rising
- Producer: Bekon; Brian Imanuel; Craig Balmoris; Diamond Pistols; The Donuts; Jacob Ray; Powers Pleasant

Rich Brian chronology
1999 (2020)	Brightside (2022)	Where Is My Head? (2025)

Singles from Brightside
- 1. "New Tooth" Released: 4 November 2021

Professional ratings
Review scores
Source	Rating
Pitchfork	5.5/10

Brightside is an EP by Indonesian rapper Rich Brian, released on 20 January 2022 via 88rising. The project was surprise-released, with no prior announcement, alongside a music video for the song "Getcho Mans". The EP was preceded by the 2021 single "New Tooth", which also got a music video release.

== Track listing ==
Brightside track listing
No.	Title	Writer(s)	Producer(s)	Length
1.	"New Tooth"	Brian Imanuel; Christian Dold	Imanuel; Diamond Pistols	3:40
2.	"Lagoon"	Imanuel; Dold	Imanuel; Diamond Pistols	2:50
3.	"Getcho Mans" (featuring Warren Hue)	Imanuel; Jacob Ray; Powers Pleasant; Warren Hui	Ray; Powers Pleasant	3:31
4.	"Sunny"	Daniel Tannenbaum; Imanuel; Craig Balmoris; Sergiu Gherman	Bekon; Balmoris; The Donuts	2:40
Total length:				12:41

== Personnel ==
- Rich Brian – vocals (all tracks), recording (4)
- Warren Hue – vocals (3)
- Gentry Studer – mastering
- Christian Dold – mixing (all tracks), recording (2)
- Vic Wainstein – recording (1)
- Brian Cruz – recording (3)
