= Bankroll (song) =

Song by Diplo featuring Rich Brian, Rich the Kid and Young Thug
- Genre: Hip-hop
- Length: 3:44
- Producers: Diplo; Boaz van de Beatz; King Henry

"Bankroll" is a song by American DJ Diplo. It features rappers Rich Brian, Rich the Kid and Young Thug. Originally, Justin Bieber was featured on the song, but due to Bieber already having exclusives with DJ Khaled ("I'm the One") and David Guetta ("2U") at around the same time as Diplo released "Bankroll", Diplo was forced to remove the original from his SoundCloud account. Diplo replaced Bieber's verse with a verse from Rich Brian.
