= Shang-Chi and the Legend of the Ten Rings (soundtrack) =

2021 soundtrack album

Shang-Chi and the Legend of the Ten Rings (Original Score)

Film score by Joel P. West
- Released: September 1, 2021
- Studio: Abbey Road Studios
- Genre: Film score
- Length: 68:19
- Labels: Hollywood; Marvel Music

Joel P. West chronology
Just Mercy (2019)	Shang-Chi and the Legend of the Ten Rings (Original Score) (2021)

The soundtrack for the 2021 American superhero film Shang-Chi and the Legend of the Ten Rings, based on the Marvel Comics character Shang-Chi and produced by Marvel Studios, consists of an original score composed by Joel P. West and a soundtrack album on which Sean Miyashiro and 88rising serve as executive producers that features original songs performed by various artists. The film score was released by Marvel Music and Hollywood Records on September 1, 2021, while the soundtrack album was released by Marvel Music, Hollywood Records, and Interscope Records on September 3, 2021, with four singles from the soundtrack released in August 2021.

== Shang-Chi and the Legend of the Ten Rings (Original Score) ==
Recording for the film's score, composed by Joel P. West, began at Abbey Road Studios in London by June 2021. West scored director Destin Daniel Cretton's four previous films. The original score for the film was released by Marvel Music and Hollywood Records on September 1, 2021.

=== Track listing ===
All music is composed by Joel P. West.

No.	Title	Length
1.	"Xu Shang-Chi"	2:55
2.	"Your Father"	3:13
3.	"The Bamboo Spring"	3:18
4.	"Your Mother"	2:05
5.	"Training"	1:55
6.	"Brother and Sister"	1:38
7.	"Three Days"	1:24
8.	"Don't Look Down"	4:09
9.	"Revenge"	1:35
10.	"My Son is Home"	2:19
11.	"Zhe Zhi"	2:55
12.	"Together Soon"	1:14
13.	"Stay in the Pocket"	1:45
14.	"The Waterfall"	2:28
15.	"Ancestors"	4:12
16.	"Who You Are"	2:39
17.	"A Blood Debt"	6:16
18.	"Grief"	2:06
19.	"Is This What You Wanted?"	3:17
20.	"The Deep"	2:35
21.	"Inheritance"	4:29
22.	"I Won't Leave You Again"	4:13
23.	"The Light and the Dark"	1:46
24.	"Qingming Jie"	2:17
25.	"Family"	1:36
Total length:		68:19

== Shang-Chi and the Legend of the Ten Rings: The Album ==
Shang-Chi and the Legend of the Ten Rings: The Album

Soundtrack album by 88rising
- Released: September 3, 2021
- Length: 61:37
- Labels: Hollywood; Marvel Music; Interscope
- Producers: Sean Miyashiro; 88rising

Singles from Shang-Chi and the Legend of the Ten Rings: The Album
- 1. "Lazy Susan" Released: August 10, 2021; 2. "Every Summertime" Released: August 10, 2021; 3. "Run It" Released: August 12, 2021; 4. "In the Dark" Released: August 20, 2021

Two singles from the film's soundtrack, "Lazy Susan" by 21 Savage and Rich Brian (featuring Warren Hue and MaSiWei) and "Every Summertime" by Niki, were released on August 10, 2021, by Marvel Music, Hollywood Records, and Interscope Records. A third single from the soundtrack, "Run It" by DJ Snake, Rick Ross, and Brian, was featured in a promotional spot for the film on August 12, and was released the following day. The track was also used as the "anthem" for ESPN's 2021–2022 college football coverage. A fourth single titled "In the Dark" by Swae Lee and featuring Jhené Aiko was released on August 20. A soundtrack album containing these songs was released on September 3, executive produced by Sean Miyashiro and 88rising.

=== Track listing ===
No.	Title	Writer(s)	Producer(s)	Length
1.	"Always Rising" (Niki, Rich Brian and Warren Hue)	Brian Imanuel; Craig Balmoris; Daniel Krieger; Daniel Tannenbaum; Nicole Zefanya; Tyler Mehlenbacher; Warren Hue	Bekon; Balmoris; The Donuts	3:04
2.	"Diamonds + and Pearls" (DPR Live, DPR Ian and peace.)	Balmoris; Krieger; Tannenbaum; Gaspard Augé; Xavier de Rosnay; Sean Miyashiro; Serge Gainsbourg; Mehlenbacher	Bekon; Balmoris; Miyashiro; The Donuts	3:39
3.	"In the Dark" (Swae Lee and Jhené Aiko)	Carter Lang; Jhené Aiko; Khalif Brown; Louis Bell; Teo Halm; Westen Weiss	Bell; Halm	2:41
4.	"Lazy Susan" (21 Savage, Rich Brian, Warren Hue, and MaSiWei)	Ahmar Bailey; Alda Agustiano; Imanuel; Rogét Chahayed; Sheyaa Bin Abraham-Joseph; Siwei Ma; Taylor Dexter; Hue; Wesley Singerman	Chong the Nomad; Kid Hazel; Chahayed; Taydex; Singerman	4:39
5.	"Nomad" (Zion.T and Gen Hoshino)	Danny Chung; Gen Hoshino; Jack Latham; Vince; Zion T; Kush	Jam City	3:24
6.	"Fire in the Sky" (Anderson .Paak)	Alissia Benveniste; Anderson .Paak; Bruno Mars; Chahayed; Son Tzu; Dexter; Singerman	Chahayed; Taydex; Singerman	3:21
7.	"Lose Control" (JJ Lin)	Balmoris; Tannenbaum; Marius Feder; Pete Gonazales; Miyashiro; Sergiu Gherman; Mehlenbacher	Bekon; Balmoris; Miyashiro; The Donuts	4:14
8.	"Every Summertime" (Niki)	Jacob Ray; Zefanya	Ray; Niki	3:35
9.	"Never Gonna Come Down" (Mark Tuan and Bibi)	Chris Miles; Lewis Hughes; Nicholas Audino; Te Whiti Warbrick; Hue	Nick "Unknown Nick" Audino; SICKDRUMZ	3:23
10.	"Foolish" (Rich Brian, Warren Hue and Guapdad 4000)	Imanuel; Miles; Balmoris; Krieger; Tannenbaum; Guapdad 4000; Mehlenbacher; Hue	Bekon; Balmoris; Miyashiro; The Donuts	2:57
11.	"Clocked Out!" (Audrey Nuna and Niki)	Audrey Nuna; Jeremy Reeves; Jonathan Yip; Niki; Ray Charles McCullough II; Ray Romulus	The Stereotypes; Ray	3:10
12.	"Act Up" (Rich Brian and EarthGang)	August Grant; Barney Bones; Imanuel; Krieger; Tannenbaum; Feder; Olu Fann; Gherman; Mehlenbacher; WowGr8	Bekon; Craig Balmoris; Sean Miyashiro; The Donuts	3:18
13.	"Baba Says" (Adawa and Shayiting EL)	Ada Wa; Miles; Jorgen Odegard; Sha Yi Ting; Hue	Jordan Odegard	4:23
14.	"Run It" (DJ Snake featuring Rick Ross and Rich Brian)	Imanuel; Christian Dold; DJ Snake; Rick Ross; Sim	Diamond Pistols; DJ Snake; Sim	2:43
15.	"Swan Song" (Saweetie and Niki)	Diamonté Harper; Ray; Zefanya	Ray	2:47
16.	"War With Heaven" (Keshi)	Grant; Ray; Patrick "JQue" Smith; Dexter; Tyrone Fuller; Singerman	Ray; Taylor Dexter; Singerman	3:13
17.	"Hot Soup" (88rising and Simu Liu)	Balmoris; Krieger; Tannenbaum; Miyashiro; Mehlenbacher	Bekon; Balmoris; The Donuts	3:07
18.	"Warriors" (Warren Hue and Seori)	Grant; Balmoris; Dacoury Natche; Krieger; Tannebaum; Isaac DeBoni; Feder; Michael Mule; Pete Gonzales; Gherman; Mehlenbacher; Tyrone Fuller; Hue	Bekon; Balmoris; DJ Dahi; Miyashiro; The Donuts	3:59
Total length:				61:37

=== Charts ===
Chart performance for Shang-Chi and the Legend of the Ten Rings: The Album
Chart (2021)	Peak position
Australian Albums (ARIA)	88
Canadian Albums (Billboard)	47
US Billboard 200	160
US Soundtrack Albums (Billboard)	3

== Additional music ==
"Hotel California" by the Eagles is featured in the film's mid-credits scene, but is not included in either soundtrack album.
