= Sean Miyashiro =

CEO of American music company 88rising

- Born: May 28, 1981 (age 45); San Jose, California, U.S.
- Occupation: Record producer
- Known for: CEO and founder of 88rising
- Website: 88rising.com

Sean Miyashiro (born May 28, 1981 in San Jose, California) is an American record producer, founder and CEO of an Asian-American music company 88rising.

== Early life ==
Miyashiro, who is of Japanese and Korean descent, was raised in San Jose, California. His eclectic taste in music was largely influenced by his parents. Miyashiro’s father was an avid soul and Beach Boys fan who nurtured his son’s music discovery via after school trips to stores like the historic Tower Records on Los Angeles’ Sunset Strip.

Miyashiro attended San Jose State University, where he began organizing shows and promoting parties for campus fraternities and student groups. By age 20, he was managing three nightclubs and throwing underground raves.

== Career ==
In 2013, Miyashiro helped to launch Thump, Vice’s onetime electronic-music site, where he worked with a range of notable artists and forged deeper roots into the music industry. At Thump, Miyashiro developed his vision for 88rising: a multi-faceted media entity dedicated to celebrating the Asian artists he loved and centering them in mainstream culture. At its core, Miyashiro aimed to replicate what he created with Vice but geared toward Asian culture.

In 2015, Miyashiro launched American music company 88rising, initially known as CXSHXNLY (pronounced "cash only"), from the roof of a Bronx parking garage. The original 88rising portfolio spanned editorial and content creation to artist management.

A year after launch, Miyashiro connected with and signed Indonesian rapper Rich Brian to 88rising after the then 16 year old released a viral debut single. Soon afterwards, Miyashiro met and signed other rising Asian talent, including Japanese-Australian artist Joji, Indonesian singer-songwriter NIKI, and Hong Kong singer Jackson Wang. Under Miyashiro’s management, these artists helped catapult 88rising to international renown.

Miyashiro continued to evolve 88rising, expanding its facilities to include the annual Head in the Clouds music festival. The festival was founded in Los Angeles in 2018 and has had runs in New York, Jakarta, and Manila.

Over the years, 88rising has amassed over 200 million followers across global social media platforms and over 50 billion streams and views. With Miyashiro at its helm, 88rising has made history on a number of occasions: in 2018, Joji became the first Asian artist to top the Billboard R&B/Hip-Hop charts, Spotify’s Weekly Global Albums chart and enter the top 10 on Mediabase’s Top 40 chart; a partnership with SiriusXM in 2020 marked the first all-Asian radio channel in North America. 88rising is also the first label to score its own billing on Coachella’s lineup, following a medley performance on the main stage in 2022 titled “Head In The Clouds Forever”.

The collective announced a deal with Sony Pictures TV in 2021 and brought a film Miyashiro executive produced to Sundance in early 2023. In 2023, Sony Music announced a global distribution deal with 88rising.

Miyashiro also helped produce the soundtrack for American superhero film Shang-Chi and the Legend of the Ten Rings.

== Awards ==
In 2019, the collective was awarded Label of the Year by NetEase, one of China's largest music streaming platforms.

In 2021, Miyashiro was awarded the “Changemaker” award at the Unforgettable Gala, which recognizes the Asian and Pacific Islander leaders who have fought for API presence in the arts, entertainment, and culture.
