= August 08 (musician) =

American musician (1992–2023)

Background information
- Also known as: August Grant
- Born: Ray Davon Jacobs; January 2, 1992; Los Angeles, California, U.S.
- Died: August 26, 2023 (aged 31) Los Angeles, California, U.S.
- Genres: R&B; electronic
- Occupations: Musician; singer; songwriter; rapper
- Instrument: Vocals

Ray Davon Jacobs (January 2, 1992 – August 26, 2023), known professionally as August 08, was an American musician. He co-wrote the Billboard topping hit "I'm the One" by DJ Khaled featuring Justin Bieber, Quavo, Chance the Rapper and Lil Wayne.

== Early life ==
Jacobs grew up in South Los Angeles. He had two older sisters. Although he did not have any musical influence from his parents, his introduction to music was due to his cousins. At their house, they and Jacobs used the digital audio workstation Fruity Loops, leading Jacobs to discover a passion for music production.

== Signing with 88rising and debut ==
In 2018, he signed with American music label 88rising. He released his debut project, Father, on May 11, 2018.

== Death ==
August 08 was shot dead in a case of mistaken identity, after a group of Crips mistook him as a Blood over his red hat. The musician's death was ruled a homicide. He died on August 26, 2023, at the age of 31.

== Posthumous album ==
His first posthumous album, Pretend It's Okay, was released on August 8, 2024.

== Discography ==
=== Studio albums ===
- Father (2018)
- Emotional Cuh (2020)
- Seasick (2022)
- Pretend It's Okay (2024)

=== EPs ===
- Happy Endings with an Asterisk (2019)
- Towards the Sun (2022)
- Towards the Moon (2022)

=== Singles ===
- "Funeral" (2018)
- "Lately" (2018)
- "Spiral" featuring Wynne (2018)
- "Blood on My Hands" featuring Smino (2019)
- "Simple Pleasures" (2019)
- "Lovely" with Bonnie McKee (2019)
- "Simple Pleasures" featuring GoldLink (2019)
- "Bussdown Your Soul" featuring Barney Bones (2020)
- "Keep Me Around" (2021)
- "500 Days" (2022)
- "Water Sign" with Jhené Aiko (2022)
- "Bruises" (2023)

=== Additional appearances ===
- Rich Brian – "Arizona" (2018)
- 88rising – "Midsummer Madness" with Joji, Rich Brian & Higher Brothers (2018)
- 88rising – "I Want In" with Niki (2018)
- 88rising – "Disrespectin" with Rich Brian & Higher Brothers (2018)
- 88rising – "Poolside Manor" with Niki (2018)
- 88rising & Krane – "Midsummer Madness [Krane Remix]" with Joji, Rich Brian & Higher Brothers (2018)
- Jesse Saint John – "Alex's Song" (2019)
- 88rising – "Calculator" with Barney Bones (2019)
- 88rising – "Hopscotch" with Barney Bones, Joji & Rich Brian (2019)
- 88rising – "Tequila Sunrise" with Jackson Wang, Higher Brothers & GoldLink (2020)
- Lata Harbor – "Wash My Hands" with Marc E. Bassy & Collett (2020)
- Barney Bones – "Warm Grits" (2020)
- Melo – "Talk Less and Feel More" with Higher Brothers & Barney Bones (2020)
- 88rising – "Midsummer Madness 20" with Danny Ocean, Joji, Rich Brian & Higher Brothers (2020)
- IX Wulf – "New Street Blues" (2021)
- Yng Webb – "Switch Up" (2021)
- Snoop Dogg Presents Algorithm – GYU featuring Ty Dolla $ign & Bino Rideaux (2021)
- Marqus Clae – "Safe Haven" (2022)
- Def the Halls – "Silent Night" (2022)
- Def the Halls – "Under the Mistletoe" with Kendra Jae (2022)
- House Party (New Motion Picture Soundtrack) – Baby Mama Benz featuring Barney Bones (2023)
- Tony Black – "Emotions" (2023)
