= 626 Night Market =

Night Market in California

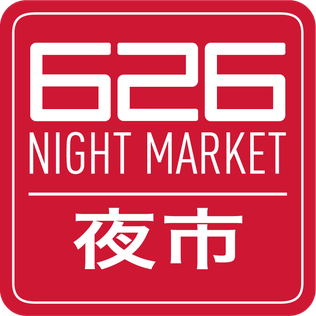
- Locations: Santa Anita Park in Arcadia, California; OC Fair & Event Center in Costa Mesa, California; Alameda County Fair in Pleasanton, California
- Established: 2012
- Website: 626nightmarket.com

626 Night Market is a regular night market located in the 626 area code region of San Gabriel Valley, northeast of Los Angeles. As of 2022 it is the largest night market in the United States.

== Format ==
The event is held multiple times a year from May through September. Each 3-day night market event draws up to 100,000 attendees with more than 250 participating food, merchandise, and craft vendors, as well as art and music. The market is held at Santa Anita Park in Arcadia. It is the largest night market in the United States.

The events are known for their large selection of Instagram-friendly foods, ranging from traditional night market snacks found in Asia such as stinky tofu and meat skewers to fusion cuisine such as pho tacos and ramen burgers. Vendors are local artisans and aspiring chefs plus entrepreneurs who already own a restaurant, retail store or food truck, or those who are launching a new product or brand or test-marketing a new concept.

== History ==
Conceived by Jonny C. Hwang, a businessman born in Taiwan and raised in southern California, the market was inspired by the night markets of Asia, especially the Shilin Night Market in Taipei. The inaugural market was held in 2012 and drew an unexpectedly large crowd that clogged the streets of Old Town Pasadena, initially drawing negative criticism from attendees and allegations of mismanagement. The market subsequently relocated to Santa Anita Park.

== Related events ==
626 Night Market established OC Night Market at the OC Fair & Event Center in Costa Mesa. DTLA Night Market was held for a limited run next to Staples Center in Downtown Los Angeles in the same year. In 2018, 626 launched NorCal Night Market at the Alameda County Fairgrounds in Pleasanton. As of 2020, all events were renamed to 626 Night Market, with OC Night Market rebranded as 626 Night Market/OC and NorCal Night Market as 626 Night Market/Bay Area. In 2022 626 launched in Santa Monica. The various locations do not overlap dates.

== Similar events ==
Since the first 626 Night Market event in 2012, a number of other night markets have emerged in Los Angeles and Orange County, including the KTOWN Night Market, the Little Saigon Night Market and the MPK Night Market.
