= Seori =

South Korean singer

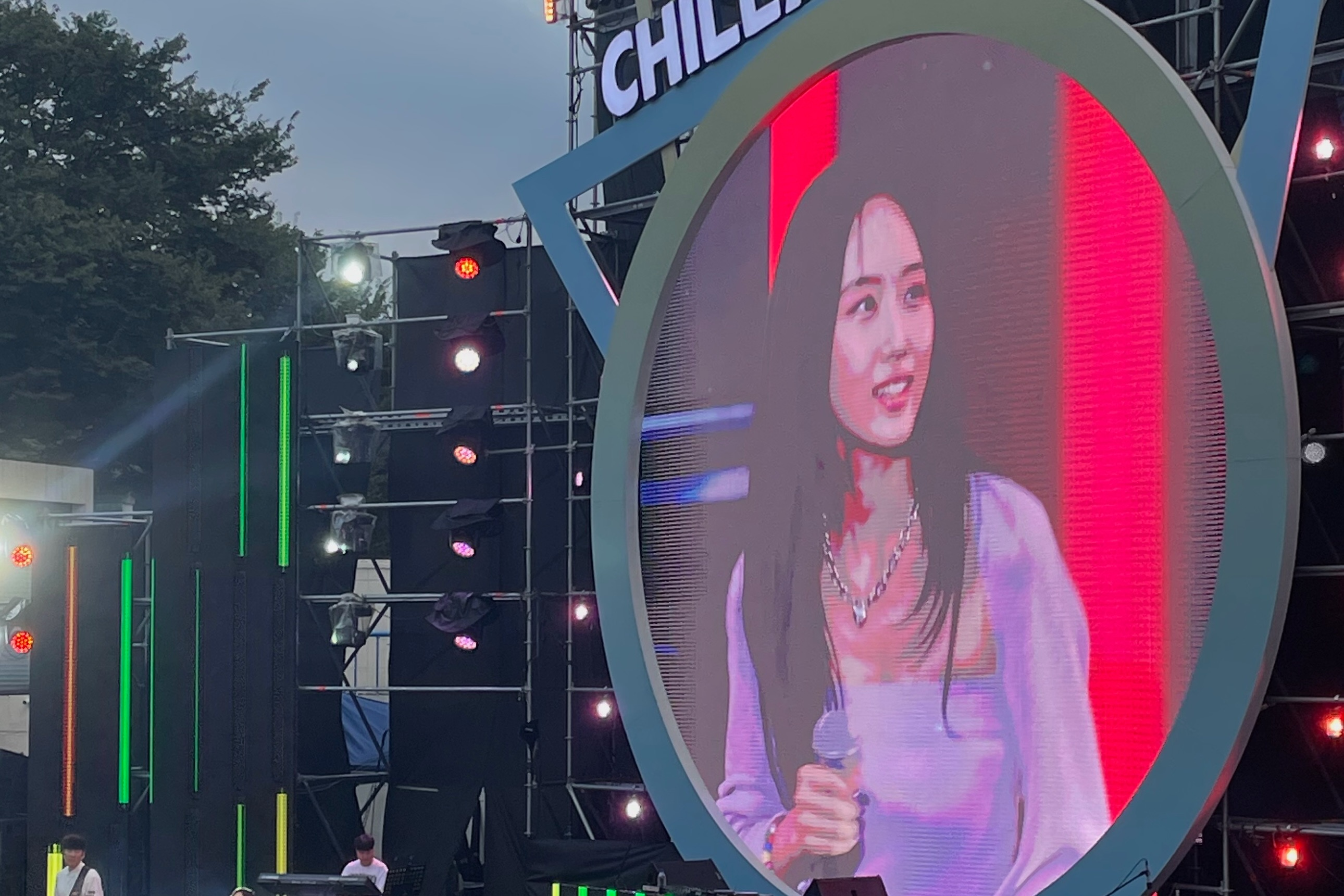
- Seori performing at Rapbeat Festival 2022
- Born: Baek So-hyun; November 18, 1996 (age 29)
- Occupations: Singer; Songwriter; Producer
- Height: 165 cm (5 ft 5 in)
- Musical career
- Years active: 2019–present
- Label: Abyss Company

Korean name
- Hangul: 백소현
- RR: Baek Sohyeon
- MR: Paek Sohyŏn

Baek So-hyun (Korean: 백소현, born November 18, 1996), known professionally as Seori (Korean: 서리), is a South Korean singer-songwriter formerly under the label Atispaus. She made her solo debut on May 12, 2020, with the extended play ?Depacse Ohw.

Prior to her official debut, she often uploaded song covers to YouTube, because she wanted to see how her voice was received by others.

== Career ==
In 2022, Seori became the first Korean female soloist to feature in the Grammy's Global Spin series. In July 2023, Seori left her label, Atispaus. On October 30, Seori announced that she had signed with Label Sayu. On January 31, 2024, Seori dropped the single "Broken" which marks her first release under Label Sayu.

== Discography ==
=== Single albums ===
Title	Album details	Peak chart positions
Title	Album details	KOR
The Long Night (긴 밤)	Released: June 10, 2021; Label: ATISPAUS; Formats: CD, digital download, streaming; Track listing: 1. "The Long Night (긴 밤)" (feat. Giriboy) – 3:30; 2. "If" (CD only)	74=

=== Extended plays ===
Title	Album details	Peak chart positions
Title	Album details	KOR
?Depacse Ohw	Released: May 12, 2020; Label: ATISPAUS; Formats: CD, digital download, streaming; Track listing: 1. "Who Escaped?" – 1:21; 2. "Hairdryer" – 3:05; 3. "Running Through The Night" – 3:38; 4. "Really High" – 3:22; 5. "Fairy Tale" – 3:38; 6. "I Wanna Cry" – 3:15	—
Fake Happy	Released: March 21, 2024; Label: Label Sayu; Track listing: 1. "Kill the day" 2. "Fake Happy"; 3. "Broken"; 4. "and Me"	
"—" denotes a recording that did not chart.

=== Singles ===
Title	Year	Peak chart positions				Album
Title	Year	KOR		SGP	US World	Album
Title	Year	Circle	Hot	SGP	US World	Album
As lead artist
"Running Through the Night"	2020	—	—	—	—	?Depacse Ohw
"Trigger"	2020	—	—	—	—	Non-album singles
"Lovers in the Night"	2021	—	—	—	—	Non-album singles
"The Long Night" (긴 밤) (featuring Giriboy)	2021	117	55	—	—	The Long Night
"Dive With You" (featuring eaJ)	2021	— (Note: "Dive With You" did not enter the Gaon Digital Chart, but it peaked at number 75 on the component Gaon Download Chart.)	—	—	—	Non-album singles
"Can’t Stop This Party"	2022	—	—	—	—	Non-album singles
"Broken"	2024	—	—	—	—	Non-album singles
As featured artist
"Skin" (허물) (Vinxen featuring Seori)	2019	80	—	—	—	Non-album single
"0x1=Lovesong (I Know I Love You)" (TXT featuring Seori)	2021	42	37	19	2	The Chaos Chapter: Freeze
"UFO" (Gemini featuring Seori)	2021	—	—	—	—	Inside Out
"Shutdown" (머리에서 발끝까지) (Moonbyul featuring Seori)	2021	— (Note: "Shutdown" did not enter the Gaon Digital Chart, but it peaked at number 38 on the component Gaon Download Chart.)	—	—	—	6equence
Soundtrack appearances
"Warriors" (with Warren Hue)	2021	—	—	—	—	Shang-Chi and the Legend of the Ten Rings: The Album
"Beautiful Night"	2022	—	—	—	—	Seoul Check-in
"Wicked"	2022	—	—	—	—	Remarriage and Desires
"Full Moon"	2023	—	—	—	—	Doona!
"Sound of your heart"	2023	—	—	—	—	Tell Me That You Love Me
"—" denotes a recording that did not chart.

== Producing and writing credits ==
All credits adapted from KOMCA, unless otherwise noted.

Song	Year	Artist	Album	Credits
"Who Escaped?"	2020	Seori	?Depacse Ohw	As writer, composer, arranger
"Hairdryer"	2020	Seori	?Depacse Ohw	As writer, composer, arranger
"Running Through The Night"	2020	Seori	?Depacse Ohw	As writer, composer, arranger
"Really High"	2020	Seori	?Depacse Ohw	As writer, composer, arranger
"Fairy Tale"	2020	Seori	?Depacse Ohw	As writer, composer, arranger
"I Wanna Cry"	2020	Seori	?Depacse Ohw	As writer, composer, arranger
"Trigger"	2020	Seori	Trigger	As writer, composer, arranger
"The Long Night"	2021	Seori	The Long Night	As writer, composer, arranger
"If"	2021	Seori	The Long Night	As writer, composer
"Dive With You"	2021	Seori	Non-album single	As writer, composer, arranger
"That's How We Ended Up"	2021	Giriboy feat. Seori	Avante	As writer, composer
"UFO"	2021	Gemini feat. Seori	Inside Out	As writer, composer
