= Dat Stick =

"Dat $tick"

Single by Rich Brian
- Released: March 11, 2016
- Recorded: 2015
- Genre: Hip-hop; trap
- Length: 2:06
- Label: Empire; CXSHXNLY
- Songwriters: Brian Imanuel; Ananta Giovanni Pranaya
- Producer: Ananta Vinnie

Rich Brian singles chronology
"Dat $tick" (2016)	"Who That Be" (2016)

Music video
- "Dat Stick" on YouTube

Remix cover

Music video
- "Dat Stick (Remix)" on YouTube

"Dat Stick" (styled as "Dat $tick") is the debut single by Indonesian rapper Rich Brian, previously known as Rich Chigga. It was released on March 11, 2016. The song was produced by Ananta Vinnie. It is widely considered Brian's breakout hit.

== Background and release ==
According to Rich Brian in a sit-down interview with Complex, the song's creation happened at a friend's house, when he invited Brian over to record a song together, to which Brian agreed. From there, Brian and his friend recorded and mixed the beat for "Dat $tick". According to Brian, he cited how it took him nearly two weeks to fully write the entire song. Brian then released the song on March 11, 2016, on streaming services. Following the release, the track began to go viral, which led to Brian getting signed by 88Rising. In the song, Brian used the use of "nigga", to which people didn't have a problem with, until later, and to Brian, he stated how he used the word to help remove power from it, causing people to be less sensitive towards it. But Brian soon realized that he shouldn't have used the word.

== Music video ==
The video of "Dat Stick" was uploaded to Brian's YouTube channel on February 22, 2016, which quickly became viral over the internet. Rappers such as Desiigner, Cam'ron, Ghostface Killah, 21 Savage, Tory Lanez, MadeinTYO and many more have reacted to the video.

== Remix ==
On October 12, 2016, the official remix of "Dat Stick" was released, which features American rappers Ghostface Killah and Pouya.

== Charts ==
Chart (2016)	Peak position
US Bubbling Under R&B/Hip-Hop Singles (Billboard)	4
US Bubbling Under Hot 100 Singles (Billboard)	25

== Certifications ==
Region	Certification	Certified units/sales
New Zealand (RMNZ)	Gold	15,000^{‡}
United States (RIAA)	Gold	500,000^{‡}
^{‡} Sales+streaming figures based on certification alone.
