= Warren Hue =

Indonesian rapper (born 2002)

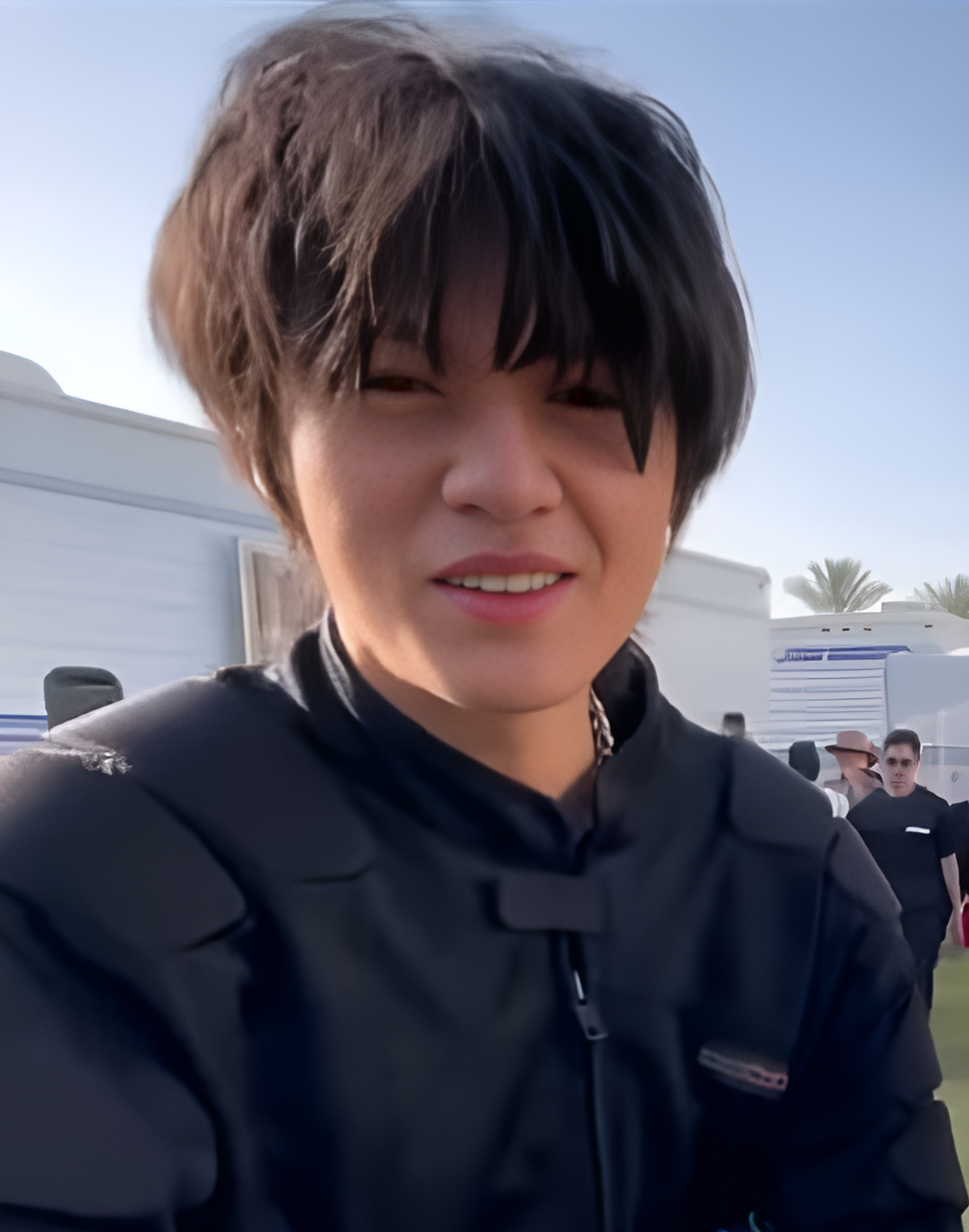
- Hue in 2022
- Born: Warren Hui; June 20, 2002 (age 23); Jakarta, Indonesia
- Other names: warrenisyellow; MisterNiceWin
- Occupations: Rapper; singer; songwriter; producer
- Musical career
- Years active: 2018–present
- Label: 88rising

Warren Hue (born Warren Hui June 20, 2002) is an Indonesian rapper, singer, songwriter and producer signed to the New York label 88rising.

== Early life ==
Warren Hue was born June 20, 2002, and grew up in Jakarta, Indonesia. He attended the British School Jakarta from Year 7 until graduation.

== Career ==
Since the age of 16, Warren has been creating and releasing music, initially from his bedroom. He began his music career with a remix of Valee's "Womp Womp" posted to SoundCloud in 2018 under the name warrenisyellow. He went on to release his debut album, Alien, after creating beats and writing lyrics inspired by Aminé's mixtape OnePointFive.

In December 2020, he became the fourth Indonesian artist to join the New York label 88rising. His first track with the label was "Freaks," a collaboration with Atarashii Gakko!. He then released the single "omomo punk" on March 30, 2021, as his debut song with the label. Additionally, Microsoft AI created a never-ending remix of Hue's single "Too Many Tears."

Four of his songs were included in the soundtrack for the 2021 American superhero film Shang-Chi, including "Warriors," which features K-pop singer-songwriter Seori.

On July 8, 2022, Hue announced his debut 88rising album, Boy of the Year, which was released on July 29.

In 2023, Hue was featured in the popular basketball game, NBA 2K24.

On May 31, 2024, Hue released "RODEO", following the releases of "SPLIT", and "TENNESSEE".

== Recognition ==
Indonesian rapper, producer, and actor Rich Brian has described Warren as "an icon for Asian rap."

In January 2022, Hue was included in the NME 100 list of essential new artists for 2022. His song "omomo punk" was selected as the Best Song by an Asian Artist, and he was also named one of the Best New Acts from Asia at the BandLab NME Awards 2022. Additionally, he was nominated for Best Song in the World at the BandLab NME Awards 2022.

Also in January 2022, he was also listed as one of the 25 artists to watch for 2022 by Ones to Watch. In February 2022, Hue was included in the entertainment and sports category of Forbes' 30 Under 30 Asia List for 2022.

In June 2022, Hue was listed by HipHopDX as one of "10 Indonesian hip hop and R&B artists to check out right now."

== Personal life ==
Hue has always been interested in fashion, as his parents both work in the garment industry.

As of February 2022, he was living in Los Angeles, California, to support his music career.

== Discography ==
=== Album ===
Title	Details
Alien	Released under the name warrenisyellow; Released on September 13, 2018; Track listing: 1. Alien - 3:13; 2. Yellow - 2:16; 3. Hearts - 2:36; 4. Forever - 3:26; 5. "Hotline Interlude" - 1:43; 6. Stone Cold Stunna - 3:08; 7. Swimming Pool (ft. Erika) - 2:28; 8. Black - 2:43; 9. UFO - 1:58
Sugartown	A joint project with Chasu; Released December 13, 2019; Track listing: 1. Sugarbaby - 3:46; 2. Blue Jeans (ft. Erika) - 3:26; 3. Head Over Heels - 3:04; 4. Pluto (ft. Ill Addicts) - 2:42; 5. 458 Gummy St. - 3:03; 6. Do U Miss Me? - 2:53; 7. Lollipop Thug (ft. Rafkyboy & Ramengvrl) - 2:44; 8. Candy Choppa - 2:27; 9. No Violence! (ft. A. Nayaka) - 4:06; 10. Bye Bye Sugartown - 4:27
Boy of the Year	Released July 29, 2022; Track listing: 1. Chords And Pressures - 1:44; 2. Thirtynine - 1:44; 3. In My Bag (with Tobi Lou) - 3:39; 4. Handsome - 2:06; 5. I$$ey - 1:58; 6. W (with Yvngxchris) - 2:31; 7. Demostar Beenlit - 2:06; 8. Runaway W Me - 3:01; 9. Botyfreestyle#1 - 1:05; 10. OK Word! - 3:35; 11. Jade - 3:34; 12. Boy Of The Year - 3:32

=== Singles ===
Year	Title
2018	"Yellow"
2019	"Why Is My WiFi Slow?"
2019	"ImNotImpressed!" (with Chasu)
2019	"Beyoncé"
2019	"blue jeans" (with Chasu ft. Erika)
2019	"candy choppa" (with Chasu)
2020	"Star in Love"
2020	"I Need U, in the Summertime" (with Chasu)
2021	"Freaks" (with Atarashii Gakko!)
2021	"Omomo Punk"
2021	"Too Many Tears"
2021	"West"
2022	"Runaway W Me"
2022	"Internet Boy"
2022	"W" (with Yvngxchris)
2022	"Handsome"
2023	"TENNESSEE"

=== Features ===
- A. Nayaka - "Curtains" (2020)
- III Addicts - "Overconcerned" (2020)
- 88rising, Rich Brian, Niki - "California" (2021)
- 88rising, Rich Brian, Niki - "California" [Acoustic Live Version] (2021)
- 88rising, Rich Brian, Niki - "California" ft. Warren Hue & Jackson Wang [Remix] (2021)
- Rich Brian - "Getcho Mans" (2022; Brightside)

=== OST ===
- Shang-Chi and the Legend of the Ten Rings: The Album ("Warriors" with Seori) (2021)
