= Keith Ape =

South Korean rapper (born 1993)

Keith Ape 키스 에이프
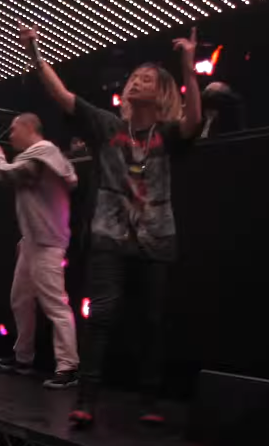
- Keith Ape performing in 2015

Background information
- Also known as: Kid Ash
- Born: Lee Dong-heon; December 25, 1993 (age 32); Seoul, South Korea
- Genres: Korean hip-hop; trap; cloud rap; scream rap; drill
- Occupations: Rapper; songwriter
- Years active: 2011–present
- Labels: 88rising (formerly known as CXSHXNLY); Hi-Lite (former)
- Member of: The Cohort

Lee Dong-heon (Korean: 이동헌; born December 25, 1993), known professionally as Keith Ape (키스 에이프) and previously known as Kid Ash, is a South Korean rapper from Seoul. He is a member of a crew called 'The Cohort'. Ape's breakout single "잊지마" ("It G Ma") was released on January 1, 2015, and was ranked by Billboard K-Town at number five on their list of the Best K-Pop Songs of 2015.

== Musical style and reception ==
Keith Ape has been called the "Korean OG Maco" and noted for an exciting concert performance at 2015's South by Southwest rap showcase, among other performances which included Young Thug, Desiigner, Waka Flocka Flame, XXXTentacion, and more. His concert at SOB's in 2015 was listed as one of The New York Times top 40 picks, "unrestrained mayhem", and "a clear inheritor of Southern rap rowdiness".

== Controversy ==
On February 4, 2015, he was accused by American rapper OG Maco of cultural appropriation. OG Maco claimed Keith Ape and friends had mocked him by using black stereotypes to sell music in their video of "It G Ma". He also claimed that they had plagiarized the basis for their track from his debut single "U Guessed It". As of August 13, 2015, OG Maco collects royalties from "It G Ma", and has since deleted his tweets regarding his accusations of cultural appropriation. Nonetheless, he declined an invitation by Keith Ape to be part of a later remix rendition of "It G Ma".

== Discography ==
=== Extended plays ===
Title	Album details
Born Again	Released: October 12, 2018; Label: 88rising; Formats: Digital download
Ape Into Space	Released: November 8, 2022; Label: UnderWater; Formats: CD, Digital download
On! the Run	Released: July 19, 2024; Label: UnderWater; Formats: Digital Download

=== Studio albums ===
Title	Album details
MOD: Ape's Basics in Time and Play	Released: September 20, 2021; Label: UnderWater; Formats: LP, CD, Digital download
A.A.T (Aquatic Ape Theory) The Lost Tapes	Released: October 17, 2022; Label: UnderWater; Formats: Cassette, Digital download
The X-Mas Is Mine	Released: December 25, 2023; Label: UnderWater; Formats: Digital download
HERE COMES THE PAIN!	Released: July 7, 2026; Label: UnderWater; Formats: Digital download

=== Collaborative albums ===
Title	Album details
Project: Brainwash (as Kid Ash with G2)	Released: January 22, 2014; Label: Luminant Entertainment; Formats: CD, Digital download
Take This Mushroom (with Lil Darkie and Christ Dillinger)	Released: September 3, 2019; Label: Spider Gang; Formats: Digital download
Ape Wolves (with Young L)	Released: February 8, 2022; Label: Underwater; Formats: Digital download
$moke Under the Water (with City Morgue)	Released: March 11, 2022; Label: Hikari-Ultra, UnderWater; Formats: Digital download
