= 88rising =

American mass media company

- Type: Private
- Industry: Music entertainment; mass media
- Founded: 2015; 11 years ago
- Founders: Sean Miyashiro, Jaeson Ma
- Headquarters: New York, NY, United States
- Key people: Sean Miyashiro (CEO)
- Number of employees: 70
- Subsidiaries: Paradise Rising (Philippines); 88INFINITY (Japan); W8VES (China); SEVENATION (China); Sunrise Club (China); DAYDREAM (China); PLAYGROUND (China); House of Jade; FLUXGEN; NewSounds Family (China); Infinite Thrills
- Website: 88rising.com

88rising (stylized as 88⬆) (or officially name: 88rising Records LLC), formerly known as CXSHXNLY (pronounced "cash only"), is an American record label founded in 2015 by Sean Miyashiro and Jaeson Ma. The company is known for promoting Asian and Asian American artists in the global music market. They have also built a multimedia ecosystem that spans music, video production, live events, and digital content. Co-founder Sean Miyashiro describes it as a "hybrid management, record label, video production, and marketing company".

88rising has offices in New York City, with additional offices in Los Angeles and Shanghai. The company serves as a music platform and record label primarily for Asian artists such as Keith Ape, Rich Brian, Niki, and previously Joji. In 2019, 88rising was awarded Label of the Year by Netease, one of the largest music streaming platforms in China. Outside of its core group, the company has collaborated with other artists, most notably KOHH, CL, DPR Live, Yaeji, Phum Viphurit, Verbal, and Hikaru Utada. The label also produced the soundtrack album for Marvel Studios' Shang-Chi and the Legend of the Ten Rings in 2021.

The company has hosted festivals in Los Angeles in New York City, Indonesia, the Philippines, and China. The label has also curated dedicated takeover stages at Coachella in 2022 and 2024.

Critics, journalists, and scholars have noted 88rising's role in shaping contemporary Asian representation all across the world, as they emphasize the label's influence on collaboration, trends, and visibility of Asian artists in pop culture and mainstream media. The company has been described as one of the most prominent platforms in advancing Asian and Asian American voices in global music and youth culture.

== History ==
=== Origins (2015–2016) ===
88rising was founded in 2015 by Sean Miyashiro and Jaeson Ma. Miyashiro had previously been helping establish VICE's electrical music vertical, titled "Thump," where he developed many of the production approaches that shaped 88's early content strategy. The company initially operated as a small collective and management company under the name called CXSHXNLY (pronounced "cash only"), focusing on identifying emerging artists online and experimenting with short form music and cultural videos designed specifically for YouTube. The company's inaugural artists include Brian Puspos, Dumbfoundead, Josh Pan, and Okasian. Miyashiro has described the collective's goal as representing Asian immigrants and other immigrant communities in popular music. The label received seed round investment from Allen DeBevoise, the founder of Third Digital Wave, after Miyashiro was introduced to him through a mutual friend. A few months later, Dumbfoundead showed Miyashiro the music video of Keith Ape's single titled "It G Ma". The single attracted attention in the United States and helped establish a foundation for the collective's future direction. Miyashiro began to work with both artists to release the remix version of the single which features A$AP Ferg, Father, and Waka Flocka Flame. The single was released on July 27, 2015, by OWSLA and the music video was premiered by Complex.

In the summer of 2016, 88rising began connecting with artists across Asia through online communication tools as opposed to traditional industry channels, facilitating remote collaborations with artists such as Rich Brian, Joji, and Higher Brothers, before any of them had moved to the United States. The company uploaded their first video content on YouTube as 88rising. These early videos helped shape the company's identity, as they combined elements of Asian internet culture, Western hip-hop aesthetics, and experimental editing to introduce Asian artists to the West.

The name 88rising references the cultural symbolism of the number 88 in Chinese communities. The name is derived from eighty-eight translating to double happiness in Chinese. The number also resembles the character 囍, and this is a meaning that the founders incorporated to reflect the company's emphasis on cross-cultural connection.

=== Breakthrough (2017–2019) ===
In May 2017, the label made a live performance as a collective at the Boiler Room in Los Angeles with Rich Brian, Joji, and Keith Ape all making appearances and performing at a mansion party in Beverly Hills. The Higher Brothers performed via live stream from their hometown in Chengdu, as they could not travel to the United States at the time. Several guests such as Yaeji and Ronny J also performed with the label. In November 2017, 88rising announced a tour across Asia featuring Rich Brian, Joji, and Higher Brothers with Keith Ape occasionally performing at select shows. The tour took place in nine major Asian cities: Seoul, Beijing, Shanghai, Chengdu, Bangkok, Singapore, Kuala Lumpur, Manila, and Jakarta.

In February 2018, 88rising presented its inaugural North American tour at The Warfield Theatre in San Francisco, The Shrine Auditorium and Expo Hall in Los Angeles, and Terminal 5 in New York City. The sold-out tour featured Rich Brian, Joji, Keith Ape with surprise guest appearances from other artists such as Charli XCX and Ski Mask the Slump God. The label also saw the debut studio releases from many of 88rising's flagship artists. On February 2, 2018, Rich Brian's released his debut album Amen to generally positive reviews and commercial acclaim, charting at No. 18 on the Billboard 200 in its first week. The album also made iTunes history by being the first album released by an Asian artist to top the iTunes Hip-Hop Chart.

On July 20, 2018, 88rising released their first compilation album titled Head in the Clouds. The album contains 17 compilation tracks, including the RIAA-certified Gold record "Midsummer Madness" and featuring its label core roster and guest appearances from other artists including GoldLink, Playboi Carti, BlocBoy JB, 03 Greedo, and Verbal. Head in the Clouds marked a turning point for 88rising, as it helped establish the label as not only a production house, but also as a cultural platform for artists wanting to showcase transnational Asian hip-hop.

On October 26, 2018, Joji released his debut album Ballads 1, which includes the RIAA-certified Platinum single "Slow Dancing in the Dark" and Gold single "Yeah Right". The album made Billboard chart history as the first album by a solo Asian artist to top the Billboard R&B / Hip-Hop charts. 88rising presented its first Head in the Clouds Festival on September 22, 2018, at the Los Angeles State Historic Park. The festival's lineup included a roster of hip-hop and R&B acts from both the United States and Asia including Rich Brian, Joji, Keith Ape, Niki, Higher Brothers, Dumbfoundead and more. The festival also hosted the debut United States performance for Japanese rapper Kohh.

In its recap of the festival, Billboard described Head in the Clouds as an Asian-focused music festival aimed at international audiences. The festival was followed by the 88 Degrees and Rising tour in Fall 2018, which featured a lineup including the label's roster alongside Sen Morimoto and Kohh.

In 2019, 88rising saw a sophomore studio releases from artists Higher Brothers and Rich Brian. On February 22, 2019, Higher Brothers released Five Stars, as their follow-up to their debut studio album Black Cab. The album featured many prominent hip-hop collaborators, including Schoolboy Q, JID, Denzel Curry, Ski Mask The Slump God, Soulja Boy and more. Five Stars became the top album on Chinese streaming platform Netease in Q1 of 2019 and the Higher Brothers were crowned Hip-Hop Artist of the Year. Netease also bestowed 88rising the Label of the Year award. On July 26, Rich Brian released his second studio album, The Sailor, which was primarily produced by Bekon and The Donuts and featured guest appearances from RZA, Joji and more.

On July 17, 2019, Billboard announced the 2nd annual Head in the Clouds music festival for Saturday, August 17, 2019, at Los Angeles State Historic Park with an additional dance music stage and an expanded lineup of music artists. Californian food festival 626 Night Market curated the food vendors. The second festival saw the North American festival debut of K-Pop group iKon as well as performances by Joji, Rich Brian, Higher Brothers, NIKI, DPR Live and many more. Rolling Stone and Los Angeles Magazine compared the event's role in Asian music to that of Coachella in the U.S. festival circuit.

The label also released their second compilation album, Head in the Clouds II, on October 11, 2019, which featured artists including Swae Lee of Rae Sremmurd, Jackson Wang, Phum Viphurit, Chungha and many more. A duet from the album, "I Love You 3000 II" by Stephanie Poetri and Wang, quickly topped the Billboard China Social Chart.

=== Expansion (2020–2021) ===
Another Head in the Clouds festival was originally planned in March 2020 in Jakarta, but was eventually canceled due to the COVID-19 pandemic. Thus, 88rising held its Asia Rising Forever festival, an online concert featuring Asia talent from around the world streamed on their YouTube and Twitter accounts, on May 6. On December 3, 2020, 88rising launched a 24-hour radio channel on SiriusXM featuring music from Asian artists. Another online live stream festival under the name Double Happiness, in reference to their slogan "88 is double happiness" was also launched the same day with performances from Anderson .Paak and Knxwledge from their musical duo, Nxworries, as well as others such as Audrey Nuna and Ylona Garcia.

In 2021, 88rising became increasingly involved with multimedia projects with a large scope to them. Most notably, 88rising executive produced and released the soundtrack album for the Marvel film Shang-Chi and the Legend of the Ten Rings. Industry reports describe the collaboration as a landmark event in Asian and Asian American representation. In a meeting with the film's director, Destin Daniel Cretton, Miyashiro apparently "hypnotized" him, leading to a partnership within days of the first meeting. While the pandemic posed challenges initially, as Miyashiro and Cretton were not in contact during the genesis of COVID-19, conversations quickly picked back up around the summer time, where both of the creatives began to ideate behind the thematic elements behind the soundtrack. The soundtrack was also viewed as a turning point for the collective's cultural profile, as the media focused on how it brought together artists across the Asian diaspora to accompany a major Hollywood release.

In addition to the soundtrack work being done during this time, artists under the label continued to release critically acclaimed and positively received projects during these years. One of the label's more successful releases was Joji's Nectar. The label helped release the album in 2020, which received international attention and further solidified 88rising as a label with influences to popular culture.

=== Recent history (2022–present) ===
In April 2022, 88rising performed at Coachella with a showcase titled Head in the Clouds Forever, including performances by CL, 2NE1, Hikaru Utada, Jackson Wang, Rich Brian, Bibi, Niki, Milli and Warren Hue. They also released a single of the same name including three tracks featuring Bibi, Utada, Hue and Rich Brian.

The company expanded internationally during this time through initiatives such as PARADISE RISING, a subsidiary created in partnership with Globe Telcom to spotlight Filipino artists and further grow Southeast Asian Representation. 88rising continued momentum, as they collaborated with Sony Music and The Orchard to elevate Japanese music and expand cross regional promotion opportunities for these artists.

== Reception ==
Commentators have highlighted 88rising's role in promoting Asian and Asian American artists in English language markets. Coverage in publications like The New Yorker, Rolling Stone, and Paper have all focused on the label's strategy of developing acts including Joji, Keith Ape, Rich Brian, and Niki. They also highlight 88rising's role in facilitating collaboration between Asian and U.S.-based musicians. Miyashiro also hopes 88rising can continue to bridge the gap between Asian and American music in the long term. The New Yorker writes about 88rising, "With artists like Joji, Rich Brian and Higher Brothers, Sean Miyashiro's company is an authority on how to create pop-culture crossovers." "Asian rap collective 88rising has quickly become one of the most popular, and groundbreaking, crews in music.", says Rolling Stone. A Paper article stated that "88rising provides not only the cultural support, but also the strategic and technical know-how to help emerging Asian artists cross over in an efficient but meaningful way."

== Artists ==
=== Current ===
- Atarashii Gakko!
- Bibi
- Dumbfoundead
- Ylona Garcia
- Warren Hue
- I-dle
- Akini Jing
- Knock2
- Lexie Liu
- Xin Liu
- Loren
- Milli
- No Na
- Stephanie Poetri
- Rhyme So
- Rich Brian
- Seori
- Jackson Wang
- Zhang Yanqi
- Youha

=== Former ===
- August 08
- Chung Ha
- Higher Brothers
- Joji
- Keith Ape
- Niki
- Okasian
- Brian Puspos
- Rina Sawayama
