= Higher Brothers =

Chinese hip hop group

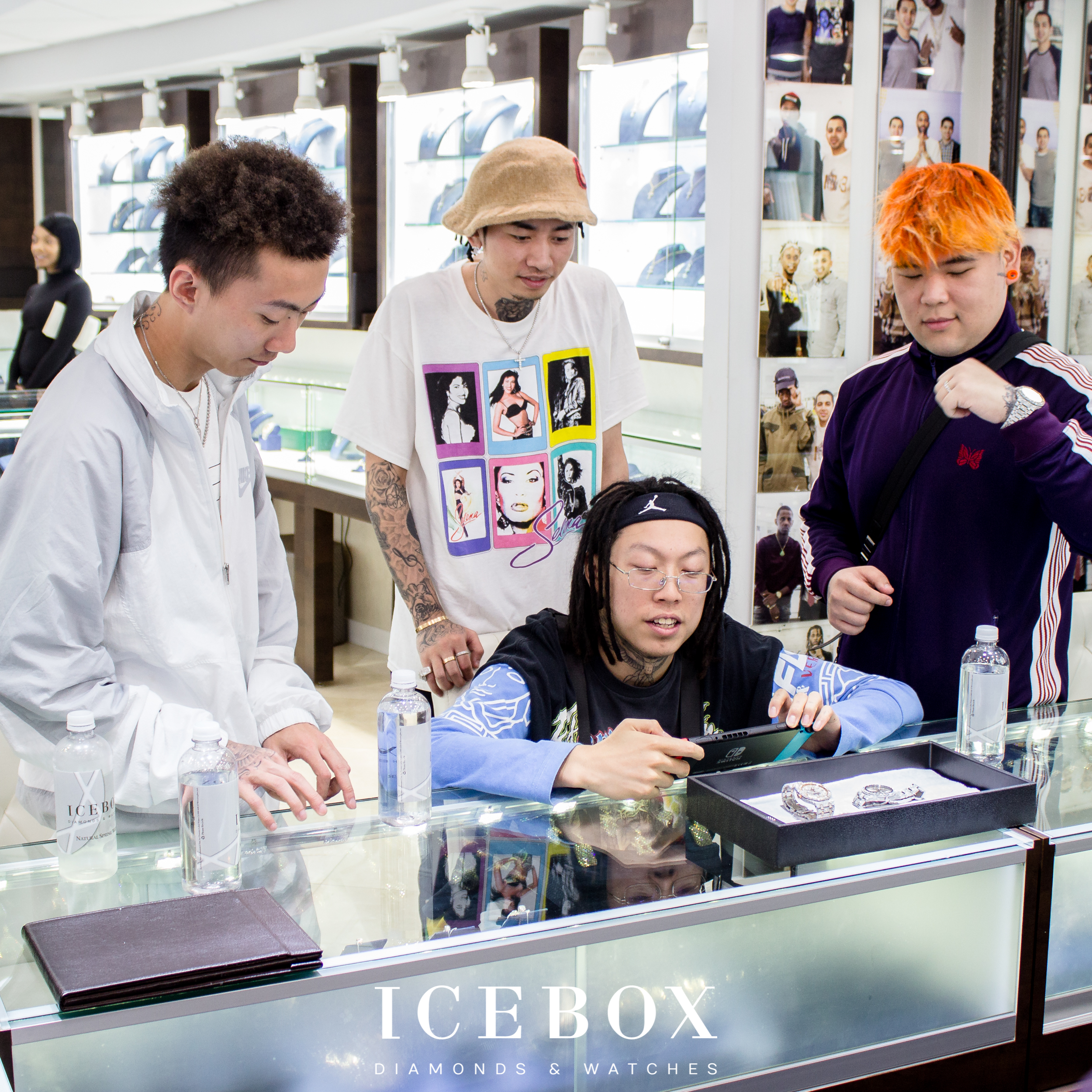
- Higher Brothers in 2019

Background information
- Origin: Chengdu, Sichuan, China
- Genres: Hip-hop; trap
- Years active: 2016–Present
- Labels: 88rising; Empire
- Members: Masiwei; KnowKnow; Psy.P; Melo

Higher Brothers (Chinese: 海尔兄弟; pinyin: Hǎi'ěr Xiōngdì) are a Chinese hip hop group from Chengdu consisting of four members: Masiwei, KnowKnow (formerly DZ Know), Psy.P, and Melo. The group was earliest known for their ghetto-styled songs in Standard Mandarin and Sichuan Dialect, such as "Made in China", "Black Cab" and "WeChat".

== History ==
=== Origins ===
Higher Brothers are formerly part of the major OG Chinese hip-hop label, Chengdu Rap House (成都说唱会馆), also known as CDC (an abbreviation of Chengdu City), which was formed in the early 2010s, and was succeeded by the name of Chengdu Corporation (成都集团),, with similar affiliated members. Melo, who was the earliest member of the Higher Brothers to join the Rap House, who performed in the quadrennial cypher, CDC Cypher 2012, alongside original Rap House members Fat Shady, Sleepy Cat, Kafe.Hu, and Lil White. Meanwhile, Masiwei began rapping around 2013 as the AKA of OG Skippy, releasing three solo mixtapes in 2013, 2014, and 2015. Furthermore, Melo and Psy.P performed as a duo called 天地会 (Tian Di Clan, or TDC), releasing a mixtape in 2015.

In 2015, KnowKnow (formerly DZ Know), who had recently arrived from Nanjing, released a song with Masiwei and Psy.P called "Haier Brothers" (海尔兄弟) after the old logo of the Chinese electronics company Haier, which features a pair of brothers. After the song received a positive reception, the members decided to form a group and name it after the song. Over time, the English form of the name became "Higher Brothers". The group's music is inspired by 50 Cent, A$AP Rocky, Kendrick Lamar, J. Cole and Migos.

The quick cycles of media consumerism in China allowed the Higher Brothers to enter the underground Chinese hip-hop scene and explode in popularity within a matter of months, and their international success would soon follow after signing with multinational label 88rising.

=== 88rising and international success ===
The Higher Brothers joined 88rising by the recommendation of Bohan Phoenix in 2016, who was the first Chinese rapper to be signed by 88rising, and had collaborated with the group in numerous occasions. They are managed by Sean Miyashiro and Lana Larkin. Larkin also appeared on a few of their tracks. The group first appeared on 88rising's YouTube channel in 2016 with the song "Black Cab". A video published by 88rising shows prominent hip-hop figures like Kyle, Lil' Yachty, Migos, and Playboi Carti reacting extremely positively to Higher Brothers' hit music video "Made in China" skyrocketed their popularity and helped push them into the public eye internationally. The video currently has over 22 million views. The Higher Brothers also appeared in both Adidas Originals and Beats by Dre commercials, and were involved in a photo shoot with Russell Westbrook to promote the opening of a Jordan flagship store in Shanghai.

Due to the success of songs like "Made in China" and "Franklin", the Higher Brothers embarked on a tour through Asia alongside 88rising artists Joji and Rich Brian in late 2017. In 2018 the group embarked on their North American Tour "Journey to the West", named after their EP of the same name which was released in January 2018. The group released their second album Five Stars in 2019, and embarked on their worldwide "Wish You Rich" tour starting May 2019. At the end of 2019 the group announced that each member would release a solo album. DZknow released his album Mr. Enjoy Da Money on December 12, 2019, and also started a street wear brand of the same name. On February 28, 2020, MaSiWei released his solo album Prince Charming, named after the 1999 movie of the same name. Melo's solo album Old Master came out in April 2020 and revolved around the theme of paying homage to old guard rappers. Psy.P released his album PsyLife.25 in May 2020, featuring the singles "Chanel", "Tongzilin" and "Bad Habits".

== Band members ==
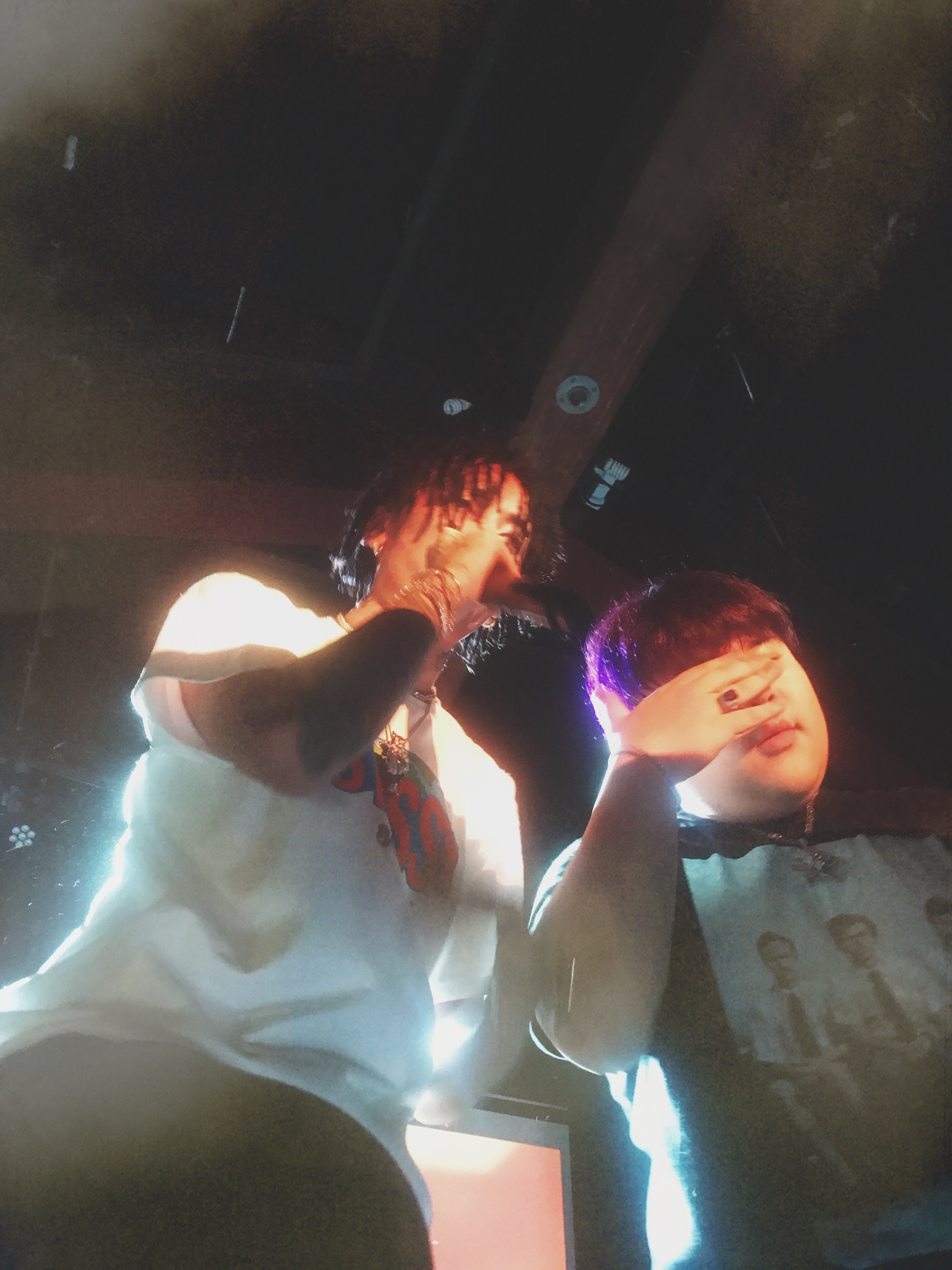
Higher Brothers performing at Seattle, Washington in March 2018

- MaSiWei (马思唯; Mǎ Sīwéi), also known as Ma Shi (马师), group leader, from Pixian, Chengdu
- KnowKnow (丁震; Dīng Zhèn), from Nanjing
- Psy.P (杨俊逸; Yáng Jùnyì), from Chengdu
- Melo (谢宇杰; Xiè Yǔjié), from Chengdu

== Discography ==
=== Studio albums ===
List of studio albums
Title	Album details
Black Cab	Released: May 31, 2017; Label: Cxshxnly; Formats: Digital download, streaming; Track listing: "WeChat"; "Isabellae" (蝴蝶); "Made in China"; "Franklin"; "Black Cab"; "Why Not"; "Mine"; "Wudidong"; "Bitch don't kill my dab"; "Aston Martin"; "Ding Mogu"; "Yah"; "Young Master"; "711"
Five Stars	Released: February 22, 2019; Label: 88rising; Formats: Digital download, streaming

=== Mixtapes ===
List of mixtapes, showing details
Title	Album details
Higher Brothers	Released: November 15, 2016; Label: 88rising, Empire; Formats: Digital download, streaming; Track listing: "Higher Brothers" (intro); 玩耍; "我打开微信不是来听你BB这些的"; "Facts" (remix); 可以; 因为; "7-11"; "Okay" (remix); 嫉妒; 该挨; 尴尬; "Cosplay"; "Interlude"; "Black Cab"; "Without You"; 冬眠; 小弟娃; 你, 我; "Outro"

=== Extended plays ===
List of extended plays, showing details
Title	EP details
Journey to the West	Released: January 17, 2018; Label: 88rising, Empire; Formats: Digital download, streaming; Track listing: "Flo Rida"; "Room Service"; "Chanel"; "Rich Bitch"
Type-3	Released: February 27, 2018; Label: 88rising, Empire; Formats: Digital download, streaming

== Impact ==
The Higher Brothers became part of a wider phenomenon in China that ventured from the traditional ways of past generations. For many in the younger generation in China, the cutthroat housing market and job and marriage markets are extremely competitive and present a lot of obstacles for young Chinese. Higher Brothers are the first Chinese rap group to achieve international recognition, rivaling the overseas popularity of Chinese pop stars like Jackson Wang and Lay Zhang.

The group has been able to circumvent Chinese censorship, believed largely due to the unmet need in cultural product of exportable quality. In an older song, Melo rapped "I don't write political hip-hop. But if any politicians try to shut me up, I'll cut off their heads and lay them at their corpses' feet." This line caused him to be brought into the Chinese public security bureau for questioning, but he was ultimately released.

The Higher Brothers bring energy and crowd involvement into their performances through multilingual integration of their music: speaking to the crowd in mandarin while rapping in English, Mandarin, and Sichuanese. This kind of higher level participation from the crowd was largely unseen in the hip-hop scene during the Higher Brothers' rise, but has since become more prevalent.
