= Rich Brian =

Indonesian rapper (born 1999)

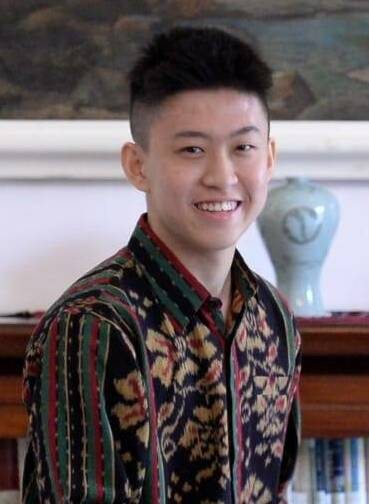
- Brian in 2019
- Born: Brian Imanuel Soewarno; September 3, 1999 (age 27); Jakarta, Indonesia
- Other names: Rich Chigga; Brian; Brian Imanuel
- Occupations: Rapper; singer; songwriter; record producer
- Years active: 2015–present
- Musical career
- Genre: Hip-hop
- Instruments: Vocals; keyboards; guitar
- Labels: 88rising; 12Tone; Empire

Brian Imanuel Soewarno (born September 3, 1999), known professionally as Rich Brian (formerly Rich Chigga), is an Indonesian rapper and singer. He is known for his viral debut single "Dat $tick", which was first released in March 2016 on SoundCloud. The single was later certified gold by RIAA. His debut studio album, Amen, was released in 2018 and peaked at number 18 on the US Billboard 200, making Brian the second Southeast Asian artist to be on the top 20 Billboard 200 after Filipino singer Jake Zyrus. Brian's second studio album, The Sailor, was released in 2019. He released an EP titled 1999 in 2020. He released another EP titled Brightside in January 2022. Brian has collaborated with many artists from China and South Korea such as Chungha, Keith Ape, Jackson Wang, and Jae Park. In August 2025, Brian would release his long-awaited, third studio album titled Where Is My Head? via 88rising featuring many artists such as Ski Mask the Slump God,Toro y Moi, and Maxo Kream.

== Early life ==
Brian Imanuel Soewarno was born on September 3, 1999, in Jakarta to Heru Soewarno and Megawati Purnomo. He has one older brother named Roy Leonard Soewarno and two older sisters named Stephanie and Sonia Eryka Soewarno. He is of Chinese-Indonesian descent.

Brian was raised in West Jakarta in a middle-to-low class neighborhood. Despite his father being a lawyer, he never had a formal education and spent most of his time helping at his parents' café while being homeschooled.

In 2010, while growing up in Indonesia, Brian began his career with social media when he was 11 years old. He discovered YouTube after he got a Rubik's Cube and realized he could log onto his parents' computer to find strategies for solving it faster. He also joined Twitter in August 2010. This eventually led him to making video content, including dark comedy sketches on Twitter. He moved to the platform Vine when he was 15 and began to post daily videos there. Brian, who at the time spoke only Indonesian, started to learn and polish his English, and had an American friend on Skype that he could talk and converse with to improve his English. He also taught himself to speak English by watching YouTube videos and by listening to rappers like Childish Gambino, 2 Chainz, Macklemore and Tyler, the Creator.

Brian began listening to hip-hop in 2012, when an American friend he knew on the internet introduced him to "Thrift Shop" by Macklemore & Ryan Lewis. Brian began to explore the genre, discovering Drake, 2 Chainz, Kanye West and Logic at first. Brian wrote his first rap song in 2014 and recorded it onto an iPhone microphone over an MF Doom produced instrumental.

Brian originally wanted to become a cinematographer in Los Angeles, however he gave up the aspiration once his music career began taking off.

== Career ==
=== 2015–2016: Career beginnings ===
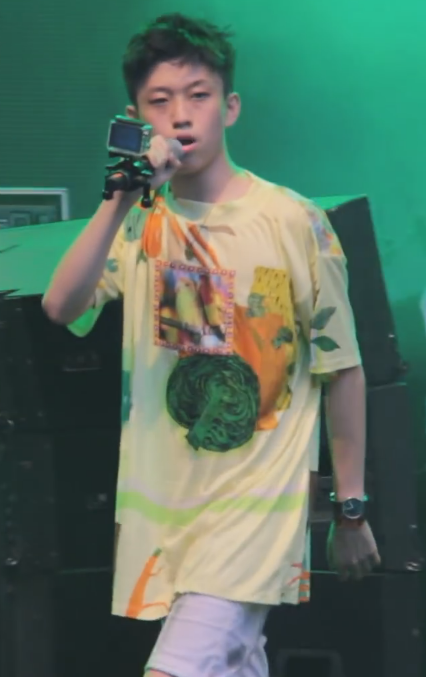
Brian performing Dat Stick in August 2016.

Brian began his career under the name Rich Chigga and released his debut track, titled "Living the Dream" on July 17, 2015, on his YouTube account. The song was produced by DJ Smokey. Brian then went on to release his debut single "Dat Stick" on March 11, 2016. Shortly after, he was signed by 88rising. "Dat Stick" track caught international success after 88rising released a reaction video featuring American rappers Ghostface Killah, 21 Savage, Tory Lanez, MadeinTYO, Desiigner, and many more. Since the official music video for the track was uploaded onto his YouTube account, it has been viewed over 200 million times. "Dat Stick" then went on to peak at number four on the Bubbling Under R&B/Hip-Hop Singles.

Brian then went on to release his second single titled "Who That Be" on iTunes on August 9, 2016. The song was produced by Sihk. He then released a remix of his debut single "Dat Stick" which features rappers Ghostface Killah and Pouya. Brian later released his third single "Seventeen" which quickly surpassed the one million hits mark on both YouTube and SoundCloud.

=== 2017–2018: Amen ===
Brian released his fourth single "Back At It" on April 19, 2017. He later started his first US tour in April 2017, which concluded in May. In May 2017, Brian released the single "Gospel" with XXXTentacion and Keith Ape. This was XXXTentacion's first collaboration with Brian and the song was released through 88rising and has since received over 38 million views on YouTube since its release.

Brian won an award at the 4th Indonesian Choice Awards as Breakthrough Artist of the Year in May 2017. Brian announced his debut album in an interview with XXL, saying "I'm working on a debut project and there are some serious songs and some comedic stuff, but the serious songs are my focus." In an interview, Brian said he was spending most of his stay in Los Angeles, California working on his debut album.

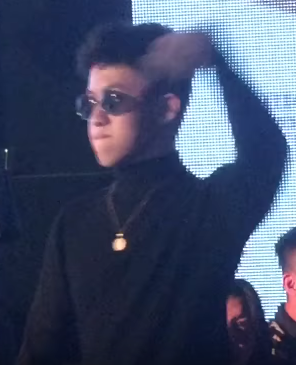
Brian performing in Taipei in June 2017.

Brian released "Glow Like Dat" on August 15, 2017, through 88rising's YouTube channel. He then announced a nationwide tour starting on September 9 and concluding on November 21 titled "Come to My Party Tour". Brian later released the singles "Chaos" and "Crisis" featuring 21 Savage in October and November 2017 respectively. On December 19, 2017, Brian announced on the social media platform Twitter that he was releasing his debut studio album titled, Amen. On January 1, 2018, Brian officially changed his stage name from "Rich Chigga" to "Brian" with the release of "See Me". This was due to backlash he received as a result of the racial undertones of the original name. Six days later, he changed his stage name again to "Rich Brian". Brian later went on and appeared on a single and music video with Kris Wu, Joji, Trippie Redd and Baauer titled, "18" on January 16. On February 2, Amen was released and made him the first Asian musician to reach number one on iTunes Hip Hop charts and went on to peak at number 18 on the US Billboard 200.

Following the release of Amen, Brian released "Watch Out!" on April 4, 2018. He later appeared on 88rising's compilation album, Head in the Clouds and released two singles to promote the album with "Midsummer Madness" featuring Joji, Higher Brothers, Kyle Chan, AUGUST08, and "History" which were released on June 7 and July 18 respectively. The album was released on July 20, 2018.

=== 2019–present: The Sailor, 1999 and Brightside ===
On June 26, 2019, Brian released a new single, titled "Yellow", featuring the artist and producer Bekon and later announced his second studio album titled The Sailor. He then released the second single from the album "Kids" on July 17, 2019. The Sailor was released on July 26, 2019, with guest appearances from RZA and Joji.

On August 25, 2020, Brian released an EP titled 1999. The seven-track EP was preceded with three singles with accompanying music videos: "Don't Care", "Love in my Pocket" and "DOA".

Brian's career jumped into the mainstream in August 2021 when the soundtrack for Marvel's Shang-Chi and the Legend of the Ten Rings was released with several songs by and featuring Brian, including "Run It" by Brian, DJ Snake, and Rick Ross. The track received heavy airplay as ESPN's anthem for its 2021–2022 college football coverage. It was then reported in October that Brian had been cast in his film debut by indie film director Justin Chon to play an up-and-coming rapper whose escalating popularity leads him to confront his relationship with his father.

On January 20, 2022, Brian released an EP titled Brightside. The four-track EP was preceded by a single titled "New Tooth". On the day of the EP's release, a music video for one of its songs, "Getcho Mans", which features fellow Indonesian rapper Warren Hue, was also released.

On October 18, 2023, Brian released a single titled "World Stop Turning", featuring Warren Hue.

On March 6, 2025, Brian announced his third studio album, Where Is My Head?, set for release on May 23, but later was pushed back to August 15 due to track listing re-assessment.

== Musical style ==
Brian's musical style has been called "ironic" by UrbanDaddy though it "eventually transcends itself to become a legitimate piece of art." Brian's vocals have been described as baritone, and his delivery as "gruff yet agile" and "unique". His song writing ability has been called "skilled" by HotNewHipHop. Brian, originally making comedic music, has since attempted to distance himself and make more serious music with singles such as "Seventeen" and "Glow Like Dat".

With the release of "Yellow" on June 26, 2019, Brian's musical style expanded. In an interview with Complex Magazine, he states that his album "The Sailor" is an "important step forward for his art" and he is beginning to "write about things that are deeply personal to him."

After the release of his extended play 1999, in 2020, his musical style developed even more. He started to incorporate 80s funk that was very popular in 2020 according to East Side Vibes Overall, his style is "easy-going instrumental and Pop-Rap that was popular in the early to mid-2010s." His songs also have a lot of lyrical attitude to them such as "Don't Care" and "DOA". Adding to the lyrical attitude aspect, he is honest in his music and talks about his life experience with a simple and repetitive riff which is also "catchy and groovy."

Brian has cited Young Thug, Tyler, the Creator, Yung Lean, Childish Gambino and Project Pop as inspirations.

== Personal life ==
During his youth, Brian competed in Rubik's cube competitions. According to his World Cube Association page, he attended the 2010 Jakarta Open Rubik's Cube Competition. He finished 20th out of 106 during the qualification round for the 3×3×3 cube, with a best of 23.65 seconds. Brian was admitted into the first round where he finished 51st out of 105, with a best of 20.44 seconds. During the same competition, he also competed in the 2×2×2 and the 4×4×4 events. Brian finished 24th out of 74 during the 2×2 event and had a best of 7.96 seconds, while during the 4×4 event Brian finished 35th out of 43 with a best of 2:22.81 minutes. Brian also competed in the 2×2 event at the Jakarta Ceria Open in October 2010, there he finished 28th out of 67 with a best solve of 5.68 seconds.

Brian moved to Los Angeles in May 2017. As of July 2017, he was not a permanent resident of the United States.

Brian's original stage name, Rich Chigga, created controversy in the past. Brian and his friend came up with the nickname when he came out with his first song on SoundCloud. "I realized I don't really have a rap name. And then my friend from Wichita was just talking about it. We came up with a couple of names which were cool, and he was just like, 'Rich Chigga.' I was like, 'That is really catchy.' And that's honestly it." Talking about his stage name, Brian said "I do regret it – I didn't really know what I was doing and I definitely did not know people were gonna pop off like this." As a result, he changed his stage name to Rich Brian in 2018. In a Twitter post, Brian said "I have been planning to do this forever and I'm so happy to finally do it. I was naïve and I made a mistake."

Brian was homeschooled and has stated that he does not wish to seek college education, though if given the chance, he would attend film school.

== Discography ==
- Amen (2018)
- The Sailor (2019)
- Where Is My Head? (2025)

== Filmography ==
- Jamojaya (2023)

== Concert tours ==
Headlining

- Come to My Party Tour (2017–2018)
- The Sailor Tour (2019)
- Where is My Head? Tour (2025-2026)

Co-headlining

- 88rising Asia Tour (with Higher Brothers and Joji) (2017)
