= Joji discography =

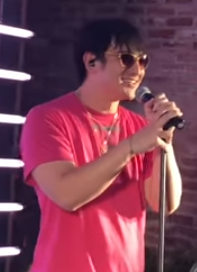
- Studio albums: 4
- EPs: 1
- Singles: 30
- Music videos: 16
- Other releases: 3

Joji is a Japanese singer and songwriter who has released four studio albums, one mixtape, two extended plays and thirty singles (including eight as featured artist), with three of those projects released under the name "Pink Guy", a comedic alter-ego created on the entertainment platform YouTube. In 2015 he made an unreleased album titled Chloe Burbank Vol. 1 featuring songs such as "Thom", "You Suck Charlie", "Unsaved Info", and "Old Yeller".

His debut studio album as Joji, titled Ballads 1, was released on 26 October 2018 and was his second project under the name, with the first being the In Tongues extended play. After a delay of several months, Joji released his second studio album Nectar on 25 September 2020. Joji's third studio album Smithereens was released on 4 November 2022, and was preceded by the singles "Glimpse of Us", "Yukon (Interlude)" and "Die for You". His fourth album, Piss in the Wind, was released in February 2026.

== As Joji ==
=== Studio albums ===
List of studio albums, with selected chart positions and details
Title	Album details	Peak chart positions										Certifications
Title	Album details	AUS	BEL (FL)	CAN	IRE	NLD	NOR	NZ	SWE	UK	US	Certifications
Ballads 1	Released: 26 October 2018; Label: 88rising, 12Tone; Format: CD, LP, DL, streaming	17	81	7	37	44	4	10	47	26	3	BPI: Gold; MC: Platinum; RIAA: Platinum
Nectar	Released: 25 September 2020; Label: 88rising, 12Tone; Format: CD, LP, CS, DL, streaming	1	22	4	11	21	9	2	17	6	3	BPI: Silver; MC: Gold; RIAA: Gold
Smithereens	Released: 4 November 2022; Label: 88rising, Warner; Format: CD, LP, CS, DL, streaming	3	27	3	15	23	4	3	11	13	5	RIAA: Gold
Piss in the Wind	Released: 6 February 2026; Label: Palace Creek, Virgin; Format: CD, LP, CS, DL, streaming	3	50	9	37	9	26	10	—	6	5	

=== Extended plays ===
List of extended plays, with selected details
Title	Details	Peak chart positions				Certifications
Title	Details	CAN	NZ	US	US R&B /HH	Certifications
In Tongues	Released: 3 November 2017; Label: 88rising, Empire; Formats: DL, streaming, 12" EP	62	38	58	28	MC: Gold

=== Unreleased albums ===
Title	Album details
Chloe Burbank: Volume 1	Planned release: 2016

=== Singles ===
==== As lead artist ====
List of singles as lead artist, showing year released and selected chart positions
Title	Year	Peak chart positions									Certifications	Album
Title	Year	AUS	CAN	IRE	NZ	UK	US	US R&B /HH	US R&B	US Rock	Certifications	Album
"Will He"	2017	—	—	—	—	—	—	—	—	—	BPI: Silver; RIAA: Platinum; RMNZ: Platinum	In Tongues
"18" (with Kris Wu, Rich Brian, Trippie Redd and Baauer)	2018	—	—	—	—	—	—	—	—	—		Non-album single
"Yeah Right"	2018	—	—	—	— (Note: "Yeah Right" did not enter the NZ Top 40 Singles Chart, but peaked at number 38 on the NZ Hot Singles Chart.)	—	—	—	21	—	BPI: Gold; RIAA: 2× Platinum; RMNZ: 2× Platinum	Ballads 1
"Peach Jam" (with 88rising and BlocBoy JB)	2018	—	—	—	—	—	—	—	—	—		Head in the Clouds
"Slow Dancing in the Dark"	2018	91	52	—	— (Note: "Slow Dancing in the Dark" did not enter the NZ Top 40 Singles Chart, but peaked at number four on the NZ Hot Singles Chart.)	—	69	39	7	—	ARIA: Platinum; BPI: Gold; RIAA: 5× Platinum; RMNZ: 3× Platinum	Ballads 1
"Can't Get Over You" (featuring Clams Casino)	2018	—	—	—	— (Note: "Can't Get Over You" did not enter the NZ Top 40 Singles Chart, but peaked at number 29 on the NZ Hot Singles Chart.)	—	—	—	—	—	RIAA: Platinum; RMNZ: Gold	Ballads 1
"Test Drive"	2018	—	—	—	— (Note: "Test Drive" did not enter the NZ Top 40 Singles Chart, but peaked at number 30 on the NZ Hot Singles Chart.)	—	—	—	19	—	RIAA: Platinum; RMNZ: Gold	Ballads 1
"Sanctuary"	2019	42	58	61	32	63	80	32	7	—	ARIA: Gold; BPI: Silver; RIAA: Gold; RMNZ: Platinum	Nectar
"Breathe" (with 88rising and Don Krez)	2019	—	—	—	—	—	—	—	—	—		Head in the Clouds II
"Run"	2020	39	57	47	— (Note: "Run" did not enter the NZ Top 40 Singles Chart, but peaked at number four on the NZ Hot Singles Chart.)	46	68	—	—	— (Note: "Run" did not enter the Billboard Hot Rock & Alternative Songs, but peaked at number 30 on the Billboard Alternative Songs Charts.)	RIAA: Platinum; RMNZ: Gold	Nectar
"Gimme Love"	2020	68	82	90	— (Note: "Gimme Love" did not enter the NZ Top 40 Singles Chart, but peaked at number four on the NZ Hot Singles Chart.)	86	— (Note: "Gimme Love" did not enter the Billboard Hot 100, but peaked at number 1 on the Bubbling Under Hot 100 chart.)	—	—	12	RIAA: Gold; RMNZ: Gold	Nectar
"Daylight" (with Diplo)	2020	100	—	—	— (Note: "Daylight" did not enter the NZ Top 40 Singles Chart, but peaked at number eight on the NZ Hot Singles Chart.)	—	— (Note: "Daylight" did not enter the Billboard Hot 100, but peaked at number 4 on the Bubbling Under Hot 100 chart.)	—	—	12	RIAA: Gold; RMNZ: Gold	Nectar
"Your Man"	2020	85	83	73	— (Note: "Your Man" did not enter the NZ Top 40 Singles Chart, but peaked at number six on the NZ Hot Singles Chart.)	—	— (Note: "Your Man" did not enter the Billboard Hot 100, but peaked at number 16 on the Bubbling Under Hot 100 chart.)	—	—	—		Nectar
"Glimpse of Us"	2022	1	5	2	1	12	8	—	—	—	ARIA: 2× Platinum; BPI: Platinum; MC: 2× Platinum; RIAA: 2× Platinum; RMNZ: 2× Platinum	Smithereens
"Yukon (Interlude)"	2022	—	95	—	— (Note: "Yukon (Interlude)" did not enter the NZ Top 40 Singles Chart, but peaked at number three on the NZ Hot Singles Chart.)	—	— (Note: "Yukon (Interlude)" did not enter the Billboard Hot 100, but peaked at number 12 on the Bubbling Under Hot 100 chart.)	—	—	—		Smithereens
"Die for You"	2022	38	43	34	32	39	53	—	—	4	RMNZ: Gold	Smithereens
"Pixelated Kisses"	2025	54	44	50	29	37	38	—	—	4		Piss in the Wind
"If It Only Gets Better"	2025	—	—	—	— (Note: "If It Only Gets Better" did not enter the NZ Top 40 Singles Chart, but peaked at number 14 on the NZ Hot Singles Chart.)	—	—	—	—	25		Piss in the Wind
"Past Won't Leave My Bed"	2025	100	64	—	— (Note: "Past Won't Leave My Bed" did not enter the NZ Top 40 Singles Chart, but peaked at number 2 on the NZ Hot Singles Chart.)	—	79	—	—	9		Piss in the Wind
"Love You Less"	2026	—	—	—	— (Note: "Love You Less" did not enter the NZ Top 40 Singles Chart, but peaked at number 2 on the NZ Hot Singles Chart.)	—	—	—	—	26		Piss in the Wind
"Last of a Dying Breed"	2026	—	—	—	— (Note: "Last of a Dying Breed" did not enter the NZ Top 40 Singles Chart, but peaked at number 4 on the NZ Hot Singles Chart.)	—	— (Note: "Last of a Dying Breed" did not enter the Billboard Hot 100, but peaked at number 5 on the Bubbling Under Hot 100 chart.)	—	—	14		Piss in the Wind
"Beautiful" (with Anyma)	2026	—	—	—	—	—	—	—	—	—		
"—" denotes items which were not released in that country or failed to chart.

==== As a featured artist ====
List of singles as featured artist, showing year released and selected chart positions
Title	Year	Peak chart positions	Certifications	Album
Title	Year	US R&B	Certifications	Album
"Besidju" (Shamana featuring Joji)	2016	—		Non-album singles
"Nomadic" (Higher Brothers featuring Joji)	2017	—		Non-album singles
"FeelTheRage" (Lil Gnar featuring Night Lovell and Joji)	2018	—		Non-album singles
"Midsummer Madness" (88rising featuring Joji, Rich Brian, Higher Brothers and August 08)	2018	23	RIAA: Platinum; RMNZ: Gold	Head in the Clouds
"Make It Right" (Nessly featuring Joji)	2018	—		Wildflower
"Gates to the Sun" (SahBabii featuring Joji)	2020	—		Non-album single
"From You" (Bonobo featuring Joji)	2022	—		Fragments
"Thinking Bout You" (Rei Brown featuring Joji)	2022	—		Xeno
"—" denotes items which were not released in that country or failed to chart.

=== Other charted and certified songs ===
List of other charted songs, showing year released and selected chart positions
Title	Year	Peak chart positions							Certifications	Album
Title	Year	CAN	LTU	NZ Hot	UK	US Bub.	US Rock	WW	Certifications	Album
"Demons"	2017	—	—	—	—	—	—	—	RIAA: Gold	In Tongues
"Worldstar Money (Interlude)"	2017	—	—	—	—	—	—	—	RIAA: Gold; BPI: Silver; RMNZ: Platinum	In Tongues
"Attention"	2018	—	—	17	—	—	—	—		Ballads 1
"Wanted U"	2018	—	—	24	—	—	—	—	RIAA: Gold	Ballads 1
"No Fun"	2018	—	—	28	—	—	—	—		Ballads 1
"R.I.P." (featuring Trippie Redd)	2018	—	—	25	—	—	—	—	RIAA: Gold	Ballads 1
"Walking" (with 88rising and Jackson Wang featuring Swae Lee and Major Lazer)	2019	—	—	28	—	—	—	—		Head in the Clouds II
"Ew"	2020	—	—	7	97	1	—	—		Nectar
"Modus"	2020	—	—	12	—	20	33	—		Nectar
"Afterthought" (with Benee)	2020	—	—	3	—	—	28	—	RMNZ: Gold	Nectar
"Upgrade"	2020	—	—	—	—	—	29	—		Nectar
"High Hopes" (featuring Omar Apollo)	2020	—	—	—	—	—	31	—		Nectar
"Normal People" (featuring Rei Brown)	2020	—	—	—	—	—	32	—		Nectar
"Reanimator" (featuring Yves Tumor)	2020	—	—	—	—	—	41	—		Nectar
"Tick Tock"	2020	—	—	—	—	—	18	—		Nectar
"777"	2020	—	—	—	—	—	33	—		Nectar
"Feeling Like the End"	2022	90	99	7	—	1	—	135		Smithereens
"Before the Day Is Over"	2022	95	—	10	—	3	10	141		Smithereens
"Dissolve"	2022	—	—	—	—	9	15	—		Smithereens
"Night Rider"	2022	—	—	—	—	5	12	192		Smithereens
"BlahBlahBlah Demo"	2022	—	—	—	—	16	19	—		Smithereens
"1AM Freestyle"	2022	—	—	—	—	8	14	—		Smithereens
"Cigarette"	2026	—	—	13	—	—	—	—		Piss in the Wind
"Love Me Better"	2026	—	—	—	—	—	40	—		Piss in the Wind
"Piece of You" (with Giveon)	2026	—	—	11	—	17	—	—		Piss in the Wind
"Hotel California"	2026	—	—	9	—	—	16	—		Piss in the Wind
"Forehead Touch the Ground"	2026	—	—	—	—	—	43	—		Piss in the Wind
"Can't See Sh*t in the Club"	2026	—	—	—	—	—	38	—		Piss in the Wind
"Sojourn"	2026	—	—	12	—	—	31	—		Piss in the Wind
"Bluffin'" (with the Kid Laroi)	2026	—	—	19	—	—	—	—		Piss in the Wind
"—" denotes items which failed to chart.

=== Guest appearances ===
List of non-single guest appearances, with other performing artists, showing year released and album name
Title	Year	Other artist(s)	Album
"Introvert"	2018	Rich Brian	Amen
"Make It Right"	2018	Nessly	Wildflower
"OMG"	2018	RL Grime, Chief Keef	Nova
"On My Way Out"	2018	Getter	Visceral
"Think About U"	2018	Ryan Hemsworth	Elsewhere
"Where Does the Time Go"	2019	Rich Brian	The Sailor
"What We Used to Be"	2022	August 08	Towards the Moon

=== Remixes ===
Title	Year	Artist	SoundCloud views (As of 2018)	YouTube views (88rising)
"Medicine"	2014	Daughter	1.4 M	4.9 M

== As "Pink Guy" ==
=== Studio albums ===
List of studio albums, with selected chart positions
Title	Album details	Peak chart positions									
Title	Album details	US	US R&B/HH	US Rap	US Comedy	US Ind.	CAN	FIN	NL	NOR	NZ Heat.
Pink Season	Released: 4 January 2017; Label: Self-released; Formats: Digital download	70	9	7	1	2	61	46	157	38	3

=== Extended plays ===
List of extended plays, with selected chart positions
Title	Details	Peak chart positions
Title	Details	US Comedy
Pink Season: The Prophecy	Released: 24 May 2017; Label: 88rising; Formats: Digital download	2

=== Mixtapes ===
List of mixtapes
Title	Album details
Pink Guy	Released: 22 May 2014; Label: Self-released; Formats: Digital download

=== Other charted songs ===
Title	Year	Peak chart positions	Album
Title	Year	US Com.	Album
"STFU"	2017	4	Pink Season
"Fried Noodles"	2017	5	Pink Season
"Pink Life"	2017	10	Pink Season
"Rice Balls"	2017	11	Pink Season
"Dumplings"	2017	15	Pink Season

== Music videos ==
=== As lead artist ===
List of music videos, showing year released and director. List does not include street videos.
Title	Year	Director(s)
"Will He"	2017	Matthew Dillon Cohen
"Demons"	2017	Jared Hogan
"18" (with Kris Wu, Rich Brian, Trippie Redd and Baauer)	2018	BRTHR
"Window"	2018	BRTHR
"Yeah Right"	2018	Joji
"Peach Jam" (with BlocBoy JB)	2018	Christine Yuan
"Head in the Clouds"	2018	Christine Yuan
"Slow Dancing in the Dark"	2018	Jared Hogan
"Can't Get Over You"	2018	Saint, Joji
"Test Drive"	2018	James DeFina
"Wanted U"	2018	Michael La Burt
"Sanctuary"	2019	Eoin Glaister
"Run"	2020	Aisultan Seitov
"Gimme Love"	2020	Joji, Andrew Donoho
"Daylight"	2020	Munachi Osegbu
"Pretty Boy" (featuring Lil Yachty)	2020	James DeFina
"Your Man"	2020	Jared Hogan
"Tick Tock"	2020	James DeFina
"Upgrade"	2020	James DeFina
"777" (Note: The music video for "777" was released as an Apple Music exclusive, though, it can be found on the director's Vimeo page, and their website.)	2020	Pomp&Clout
"Glimpse of Us"	2022	Dan Streit
"Yukon (Interlude)"	2022	BRTHR
"Die for You"	2022	Actual Objects
"If It Only Gets Better"	2025	Mamesjao
"Past Won't Leave My Bed"	2025	Ethan Eng
"Pixelated Kisses (Remix)" (with Yeat)	2025	Mamesjao
"Last of a Dying Breed" / "Dior"	2026	BRTHR
"Forehead Touch the Ground"	2026	Anthony F. Schepperd

=== As featured artist ===
List of music videos, showing year released and director
Title	Year	Director(s)
"Nomadic" (Higher Brothers featuring Joji)	2017	Adrian Pereyra
"Midsummer Madness" (88rising featuring Joji, Rich Brian, Higher Brothers and August 08)	2018	Warwick Saint
"Think About U" (Ryan Hemsworth featuring Joji)	2018	techgod
