= Solaris Tour =

2026 concert tour by Joji

- Tour by Joji
- Location: North America; Europe; Oceania; Asia
- Associated album: Piss in the Wind
- Start date: 16 June 2026
- End date: 29 November 2026
- Legs: 3
- No. of shows: 41
- Supporting acts: Nate Sib; Corbin; Tommy Richman
- Website: www.jojimusic.com

Joji concert chronology
- Pandemonium Tour (2023); Solaris Tour (2026)

The Solaris Tour is the fifth concert tour by the Japanese-Australian singer Joji, in support of his fourth studio album Piss in the Wind (2026). The North American portion of the tour will include Nate Sib and Corbin, while the Europe, Asia, and Oceania portion of the tour will include Tommy Richman. The tour began on 16 June 2026, at Prudential Center in Newark, New Jersey and is set to conclude on 29 November 2026, at AsiaWorld–Expo in Hong Kong.

On 4 March 2026, Joji announced the addition of a second performance at the Intuit Dome in Los Angeles on 12 July 2026. The decision followed high ticket demand for the initial 11 July performance.

== Set list ==
This set list is representative of the show in Newark, performed on 16 June 2026. It is not intended to represent all shows of the tour.

1. "Pixelated Kisses"
2. "Sojourn"
3. "Ew"
4. "Sanctuary"
5. "Love You Less"
6. "Glimpse of Us"
7. "If It Only Gets Better" (Note: Played over speakers during an interlude portion of the show; Joji was not on stage performing the song.)
8. "Past Won't Leave My Bed"
9. "Hotel California"
10. "Daylight"
11. "Yeah Right"
12. "Worldstar Money (Interlude)"
13. "Rain on Me" (Note: Played over speakers during an interlude portion of the show; Joji was not on stage performing the song.)
14. "Will He"
15. "Horses to Water"
16. "Tarmac" / "Tick Tock"
17. "Pretty Boy"
18. "Plastic Taste" (Note: Played over speakers during an interlude portion of the show; Joji was not on stage performing the song.)
19. "Afterthought"
20. "Attention"
21. "Blah Blah"
22. "Like You Do"
23. "Reanimator" (Note: Played over speakers during an interlude portion of the show; Joji was not on stage performing the song.)
24. "Night Rider"
25. "Last of a Dying Breed"
26. "Gimme Love"
27. "Die for You"
28. "Demons" (instrumental) (Note: Played over speakers during an interlude portion of the show; Joji was not on stage performing the song.)
29. "1AM Freestyle"
30. "Slow Dancing in the Dark"

== Tour dates ==
Date	City	Country	Venue
North America
16 June	Newark	United States	Prudential Center
19 June	Toronto	Canada	Scotiabank Arena
20 June	Montreal	Canada	Bell Centre
23 June	Chicago	United States	United Center
25 June	Boston	United States	TD Garden
26 June	Brooklyn	United States	Barclays Center
29 June	Charlotte	United States	Spectrum Center
1 July	Orlando	United States	Kia Center
2 July	Atlanta	United States	State Farm Arena
6 July	Austin	United States	Moody Center
8 July	Dallas	United States	American Airlines Center
10 July	Phoenix	United States	Mortgage Matchup Center
11 July	Inglewood	United States	Intuit Dome
12 July	Inglewood	United States	Intuit Dome
14 July	San Francisco	United States	Chase Center
17 July	Portland	United States	Moda Center
19 July	Seattle	United States	Climate Pledge Arena
21 July	Salt Lake City	United States	Maverik Center
23 July	Denver	United States	Ball Arena
Europe
11 August	Dublin	Ireland	3Arena
13 August	London	United Kingdom	The O2
16 August	Manchester	United Kingdom	Co-op Live
19 August	Cologne	Germany	Lanxess Arena
21 August	Copenhagen	Denmark	Royal Arena
23 August	Warsaw	Poland	Arena COS Torwar
25 August	Amsterdam	Netherlands	Ziggo Dome
27 August	Brussels	Belgium	Forest National
29 August	Berlin	Germany	Velodrom
31 August	Zurich	Switzerland	Hallenstadion
1 September	Paris	France	Adidas Arena
3 September	Milan	Italy	Unipol Forum
North America
17 October	Mexico City	Mexico	Jardines de México
Oceania
11 November	Brisbane	Australia	Brisbane Entertainment Centre
14 November	Sydney	Australia	Qudos Bank Arena
17 November	Melbourne	Australia	Rod Laver Arena
19 November	Auckland	New Zealand	Spark Arena
Asia
21 November	Singapore		Singapore Expo
22 November	Singapore		Singapore Expo
24 November	Bangkok	Thailand	Impact Arena
27 November	Kaohsiung	Taiwan	Kaohsiung Arena
29 November	Hong Kong	China	AsiaWorld-Expo
2 December	Kuala Lumpur	Malaysia	
