= Pandemonium (Joji) =

2023 concert tour by Joji

- Tour by Joji
- Location: North America; Oceania; Asia
- Start date: September 29, 2023
- End date: December 3, 2023
- Legs: 3
- No. of shows: 32
- Supporting acts: Lil Toe; Savage Realm; Sam Gellaitry
- Website: www.jojimusic.com

Joji concert chronology
- Smithereens Tour (2022–2023); Pandemonium Tour (2023); Solaris Tour (2026)

The Pandemonium tour was the fourth concert tour by Japanese singer Joji, in support of his third studio album Smithereens (2022). With Kenny Beats as his special guest, the supporting acts are the American rappers Lil Toe and Savage Realm. Prior to its cancellation, SavageRealm and Scottish electronic producer Sam Gellaitry were set to support the Oceania leg. The tour began on September 29, 2023, at Toyota Center in Houston and was intended to conclude in December 3, 2023, at the Central Harbourfront in Hong Kong. However, following his concert at the Smart Araneta Coliseum in Manila, Joji announced the cancellation of his remaining Asia concerts for health reasons. This includes shows in Kuala Lumpur, Singapore, and Hong Kong, which were set for November 30, December 2, and December 3, respectively.

== Set list ==
This set list is representative of the show in Los Angeles, performed on October 6, 2023. It is not intended to represent all shows of the tour.

1. "Sanctuary"
2. "Yeah Right"
3. "Night Rider"
4. "Will He"
5. "Daylight"
6. "Yukon (Interlude)"
7. "Pretty Boy"
8. "Worldstar Money (Interlude)"
9. "I Don't Wanna Waste My Time"
10. "Attention"
11. "Ew"
12. "Die for You"
13. "Like You Do"
14. "Afterthought"
15. "Can't Get Over You"
16. "Plastic Taste"
17. "Gimme Love"
18. "Slow Dancing in the Dark" (Acoustic version)
19. "Slow Dancing in the Dark"
20. "Glimpse of Us"

== Tour dates ==
Date	City	Country	Venue
North America
September 29	Houston	United States	Toyota Center
September 30	Fort Worth	United States	Dickies Arena
October 3	Austin	United States	Moody Center
October 5	Phoenix	United States	Footprint Center
October 6	Los Angeles	United States	Crypto.com Arena
October 7	Las Vegas	United States	Michelob Ultra Arena
October 9	Oakland	United States	Oakland Arena
October 11	Seattle	United States	Climate Pledge Arena
October 13	Vancouver	Canada	Rogers Arena
October 14	Portland	United States	Moda Center
October 17	Denver	United States	Ball Arena
October 20	Chicago	United States	United Center
October 21	Minneapolis	United States	Target Center
October 24	Toronto	Canada	Scotiabank Arena
October 25	Columbus	United States	Schottenstein Center
October 27	Brooklyn	United States	Barclays Center
October 29	Boston	United States	TD Garden
October 31	Philadelphia	United States	Wells Fargo Center
November 1	Washington, D.C.	United States	Capital One Arena
November 4	Charlotte	United States	Spectrum Center
November 6	Atlanta	United States	State Farm Arena
November 8	Orlando	United States	Amway Center
Oceania		United States	
November 16	Sydney	Australia	Qudos Bank Arena
November 18	Brisbane	Australia	Brisbane Entertainment Centre
November 20	Melbourne	Australia	Rod Laver Arena
November 22	Auckland	New Zealand	Spark Arena
Asia
November 24	Taipei	Taiwan	Taipei Nangang Exhibition Center
November 26^{[A]}	Bangkok	Thailand	Queen Sirikit National Convention Center
November 28	Manila	Philippines	Araneta Coliseum
November 30	Kuala Lumpur	Malaysia	Merdeka Hall
December 3^{[B]}	Hong Kong	China	Central Harbourfront Event Space

Notes

- ^{[A]} This concert is part of "VERY Festival".
- ^{[B]} This concert is part of "Clockenflap".
