= Pink Season (disambiguation) =

Pink Season is a 2017 album by Japanese musician Pink Guy.

Pink Season may also refer to:

- Pink Season (Apink album), 2015
- Pink Season: The Prophecy, a remix EP by Pink Guy
