= Pink guy =

Pink guy may refer to:

- Pink Guy (pseudonym), a stagename and performance personality for Joji (musician) (George Kusunoki Miller, Japanese: ジョージ・楠木・ミラー, romanized: Jōji Kusunoki Mirā, born 1992), Japanese musician and internet personality
- PINK GUY (album), a 2014 mixtape by the eponymous personality Pink Guy (George Kusunoki Miller); see Joji discography
- Pinko, leftist, communist
- Male white person, sometimes referred to as pink or beige instead due to not being a true white color
- Gay men, from being assigned pink triangles

== See also ==
- Pink (disambiguation)
- Guy (disambiguation)
