= Justin Parker =

English songwriter and record producer

- Origin: Boultham, Lincoln, England
- Occupations: Record producer, songwriter
- Years active: 2010–present

Justin Parker is an English songwriter and record producer best known for his work with female singer-songwriters such as Lana Del Rey, Rihanna, Bat for Lashes, and Banks.

== Career ==
Parker began writing music when he was 17, but his career breakthrough came when he started working with Lana Del Rey in February 2011. Together they wrote "Video Games", the song that would launch both of their careers and would lead Parker to win his first Ivor Novello Award for Best Contemporary Song. Although label executives were unimpressed with the song, it became a viral hit after Del Rey posted the song online with an accompanying lo-fi video which led to Fearne Cotton playing the song on BBC Radio 1; "Video Games" also received critical acclaim and commercial success, charting at number 9 in the United Kingdom and number 91 in the United States. Off the back of the success of "Video Games", Del Rey asked Parker to work in collaboration with her on her first major studio album. The pair wrote twelve songs together, five of which can be heard on Born to Die. The creative relationship continued into 2012, and led to the birth of another iconic ballad, "Ride", which features on Del Rey's Paradise.

Also in 2012, Parker co-wrote the lead single "Laura" for Bat for Lashes' third album, The Haunted Man, for which he won an Ivor Novello Award for Best Song Musically and Lyrically. On the experience of writing with Parker, Natasha Kahn of Bat for Lashes said that "the actual process...only took two or three hours" and that in his creative care she was eager for him to take her away from her "more subversive ways of writing music and give me some structure and teach me something about traditional chord progression". simplicity of his collaboration with Del Rey can also be heard on "Laura". Parker also wrote the song "I Know You Care" for Ellie Goulding's second album, Halcyon. He was reported in 2012 to be working with Lissie and Eliza Doolittle on future projects.

Justin then went on to co write "Stay" with Mikky Ekko and recorded by Barbadian singer Rihanna for her seventh studio album, Unapologetic (2012). It features guest vocals by Mikky Ekko, and was released as the second single from the album on 7 January 2013. The song reached the top five of twenty-four countries worldwide including number four in the UK and number three on the US Billboard Hot 100, becoming Rihanna's twenty-fourth top ten on the latter chart, thus passing Whitney Houston's tally of 23 top ten songs.[112] Furthermore, it reached number one in Canada, Czech Republic and Denmark, while also topping the US Pop Songs chart. In an interview with MetroLyrics' Amanda Hutchison, Mikky Ekko said of Parker's understanding of songs that 'he really knows how to create a really interesting dynamic with chords that keeps you pleasantly surprised...Justin knows how to give people access to these really heartbreaking chords, and he understands how to push and pull really well with the chords. He knows how to put hurt in the chords'.

== Discography ==
Year	Artist	Album	Song	Contribution
2026	Lykke Li	The Afterparty	"Lucky Again"	Writer
2026	Lykke Li	The Afterparty	"Sick Of Love"	Writer
2026	Lykke Li	The Afterparty	"Euphoria"	Writer
2026	Everyone Says Hi	Non-album single	"Just Like That"	Writer
2026	GIULIA BE	Non-album single	"girls just wanna"	Writer
2025	Everyone Says Hi	Non-album single	"Communication"	Writer
2025	Gretel	Squish	"Maybelline"	Writer
2025	NewDad	Altar	"Other Side"	Writer
2025	NewDad	Altar	"Heavyweight"	Writer, Producer
2025	NewDad	Altar	"Pretty"	Writer
2025	NewDad	Altar	"Puzzle"	Writer
2025	NewDad	Altar	"Everything I Wanted"	Writer, Producer
2025	NewDad	Altar	"Mr Cold Embrace"	Writer
2025	NewDad	Altar	"Vertigo"	Writer
2025	Luke Sital-Singh	Fool's Spring	"True Love"	Writer, Producer
2025	SIENNA SPIRO	SINK NOW, SWIM LATER	"ORIGAMI"	Writer
2025	Everyone Says Hi	Everyone Says Hi	"Lucky Stars"	Writer
2025	Everyone Says Hi	Everyone Says Hi	"I Wish I Was In New York City"	Writer
2025	Everyone Says Hi	Everyone Says Hi	"I Wasn't Dreaming"	Writer
2025	Everyone Says Hi	Everyone Says Hi	"Holding On To Let Go"	Writer
2025	Everyone Says Hi	Everyone Says Hi	"Tried And Failed"	Writer
2025	Dean Lewis	The Epilogue (Deluxe)	"With You"	Writer
2024	Wallice	The Jester	"The Hardest Working Man Alive"	Writer
2024	Wallice	The Jester	"Sickness"	Writer
2024	David Kushner	The Dichotomy	"Universe"	Writer
2024	Sea Girls	Midnight Butterflies	"First On My List"	Writer
2024	NewDad	MADRA	"Nosebleed"	Writer
2023	NewDad	MADRA	"Nightmares"	Writer
2023	Isley	From The Valley	"Catch Fire"	Writer
2023	Georgia	Euphoric	"All Night	Writer
2023	Georgia	Euphoric	"So What"	Writer
2023	Grace Carter	A Little Lost, A Little Found	"Riot"	Writer
2023	Delacey	The Girl Has A Dream	"The End"	Writer, Producer
2023	Aidan	And It Was All For Love	"By Myself"	Writer, Producer
2022	Man-Made Sunshine	Man-Made Sunshine	"Rosebud"	Writer, Producer
2022	Joji	SMITHEREENS	"Before The Day Is Over"	Writer, Producer
2022	Jillian Jacqueline	Honestly	"Hurt Somebody Else"	Writer
2022	Suki Waterhouse	I Can't Let Go	"Blessed"	Writer
2022	George Cosby	Lonely Heartbeats	"Paris"	Writer, Producer
2022	Sea Girls	Homesick (Deluxe)	"DNA"	Writer
2022	Sea Girls	Homesick	"Someone's Daughter Someone's Son"	Writer
2022	James Arthur	It'll All Make Sense In The End (Deluxe)	"Nothing In The Way Of Us"	Writer, Producer
2022	Lucy Blue	Suburban Hollywood	"Quiz Show"	Writer
2022	Fleurie	Greetings from Supertropicali (Chapter 1)	"Supertropicali"	Writer
2022	Josef Salvat	Islands	"Islands"	Writer
2021	Josef Salvat	Islands	"I'm Sorry"	Writer
2021	Josef Salvat	Islands	"The Drum"	Writer
2021	George Cosby	We Stand Alone	"Only Ever Cry On Planes"	Writer, Producer
2021	George Cosby	Day In Day Out	"Lost On You"	Writer, Producer
2021	WRABEL	these words are all for you	"let love in"	Writer, Producer
2021	Sam Williams	Glasshouse Children	"Hopeless Romanticism"	Writer
2021	Kat Cunning	Non-album single	"Boys"	Writer
2021	Dua Lipa	Future Nostalgia (The Moonlight Edition)	"That Kind Of Woman"	Writer, Producer
2020	Celeste	Not Your Muse (Deluxe)	"I'm Here"	Writer, Producer
2020	Camelphat	Dark Matter	"Easier featuring LOWES"	Writer
2020	Patrick Droney	State of the Heart	"Where You Are"	Writer
2020	Kat Cunning	Non-album single	"Supernova (tigers blud)"	Writer
2020	Josef Salvat	modern anxiety	"human"	Writer, Producer
2020	James Vincent McMorrow	Non-album single	"Headlights"	Writer
2020	Livingston	Lighthouse	"Say The Word"	Writer
2020	Martin Garrix	Non-album single	"Drown featuring Clinton Kane"	Writer
2020	Joji	Nectar	"Run"	Writer, Producer
2019	KAWALA	KAWALA	"Who'd You Rather"	Writer
2019	Bishop Briggs	CHAMPION	"SOMEONE ELSE"	Writer
2019	Geowulf	My Resignation	"I See Red"	Writer
2019	Geowulf	My Resignation	"Lonely"	Writer
2019	Geowulf	My Resignation	"Round and Round"	Writer, Producer
2019	JC Stewart	Non-album single	"Have You Had Enough Wine?"	Writer
2019	Sasha Alex Sloan	Self Portrait	"Thoughts"	Writer
2019	babyidontlikeyou	Non-album single	"Wanna Go Back"	Writer
2019	MARINA	Love + Fear	"Too Afraid"	Writer
2019	Talos	Far Out Dust	"On and On"	Writer
2019	Drake	Care Package	"Days in The East"	Writer
2019	gnash	we	"be"	Writer
2018	Mikky Ekko	FAME	"FAME"	Writer
2018	CLOVES	One Big Nothing	"Bringing The House Down"	Writer
2018	CLOVES	One Big Nothing	"Wasted Time"	Writer
2018	CLOVES	One Big Nothing	"Hit Me Hard"	Writer
2018	CLOVES	One Big Nothing	"Kiss Me In The Dark"	Writer
2018	CLOVES	One Big Nothing	"Up And Down"	Writer
2018	CLOVES	One Big Nothing	"One Big Nothing"	Writer
2018	XamVolo	All The Sweetness On The Surface	"Adored"	Writer
2018	Vance Joy	Nation of Two	"One Of These Days"	Writer
2018	Grace Carter	Why Her Not Me EP	"Silhouette"	Writer
2017	Tire Le Coyote	Désherbage	"Jeu vidéo"	Writer
2017	Albin Lee Meldau	Bloodshot	"Bloodshot"	Writer
2017	Lana Del Rey, Stevie Nicks	Lust For Life	"Beautiful People Beautiful Problems featuring Stevie Nicks"	Writer
2017	CLOVES	One Big Nothing	"California Numb"	Writer
2017	CLOVES	One Big Nothing	"Better Now"	Writer
2017	Linkin Park	One More Light	"Invisible"	Writer
2017	Rhye	Blood	"Song For You"	Writer
2016	JONES	New Skin	"Bring Me Down"	Writer
2016	JONES	New Skin	"Lonely Cry"	Writer
2016	Billie Marten	Writing of Blues and Yellows	"Untitled"	Writer
2016	Petite Meller	Lil Empire	"America"	Writer
2016	BANNERS	Non-album single	"Half Light"	Writer
2016	Albin Lee Meldau	Lovers	"Let Me Go"	Writer, Producer
2016	The Temper Trap	Thick as Thieves	"Fall Together"	Writer
2016	Birdy	Beautiful Lies	"Deep End"	Writer
2016	Gryffin, Josef Salvat	Non-album single	"Heading Home"	Writer, Producer
2015	CLOVES	XIII	"Frail Love"	Writer, Producer
2015	CLOVES	XIII	"Don't You Wait"	Writer, Producer
2015	CLOVES	XIII	"Everybody's Son"	Writer, Producer
2015	Seal	7	"Do You Ever"	Writer
2015	Kwabs	Love + War	"Fight for Love"	Writer
2015	Mikky Ekko	Time	"Comatose"	Writer, Producer
2015	Mikky Ekko	Time	"Pressure Pills"	Writer
2015	Samsaya	Bombay Calling	"Beginning at the End"	Writer
2014	BANKS	Goddess	"You Should Know Where I'm Coming From"	Writer
2014	Sia	1000 Forms of Fear	"Straight for the Knife"	Writer
2014	Skrillex	Recess	"Stranger (with KillaGraham and Sam Dew)"	Writer
2014	Luke Sital-Singh	The Fire Inside	"Lilywhite"	Writer
2013	Lissie	Back to Forever	"Cold Fish"	Writer
2013	Icona Pop	THIS IS... ICONA POP	"Just Another Night"	Writer
2013	Keith Urban	Fuse	"Shame"	Writer
2013	Lana Del Rey	Paradise	"Burning Desire"	Writer
2013	Fallulah	Escapism	"13th Cigarette"	Writer, Producer
2012	Rihanna, Mikky Ekko	Unapologetic	"Stay" (featuring Mikky Ekko)	Writer, Producer
2012	Kristina Train	Dark Black	"Lose You Tonight"	Writer, Producer
2012	Sander van Doorn, Mayaeni	Non-album single	"Nothing Inside"	Writer
2012	Ellie Goulding	Halcyon	"I Know You Care"	Writer, Producer
2012	Bat For Lashes	The Haunted Man	"Laura"	Writer
2012	Lana Del Rey	Paradise	"Ride"	Writer
2012	Lana Del Rey	Born To Die	"National Anthem"	Writer
2012	Lana Del Rey	Born To Die	"Radio"	Writer, Producer
2012	Lana Del Rey	Born To Die	"Carmen"	Writer, Producer
2011	Lana Del Rey	Born To Die	"Born To Die"	Writer
2011	Lana Del Rey	Born To Die	"Video Games"	Writer
2010	Darren Hayes	He Will Have His Way	"Not Even Close"	Producer

== Awards ==
Year	Institution	Award
Winner
2012	Ivor Novello Awards	Best Contemporary Song ("Video Games")
2012	ASCAP Awards	Foundation Stone Award
Nominated
2013	Ivor Novello Awards	Best Song Musically and Lyrically ("Laura")
