= Piss in the Wind =

Studio album by Joji
- Released: 6 February 2026
- Recorded: 2017; 2023–2025
- Genre: Alternative pop
- Length: 45:58
- Labels: Palace Creek; Virgin
- Producers: Myles Avery; Roark Bailey; Kenneth Blume; Bnyx; Dylan Brady; Dan Farber; Sam Homaee; Joji; Nate Mercereau; Ninetyfour; Ricky Reed; Isaac Sleator; Jahaan Sweet; Sevn Thomas; West1ne; WonTon; Azul Wynter

Joji chronology
Smithereens (2022)	Piss in the Wind (2026)

Singles from Piss in the Wind
- 1. "Pixelated Kisses" Released: 14 October 2025; 2. "If It Only Gets Better" Released: 4 November 2025; 3. "Past Won't Leave My Bed" Released: 7 November 2025; 4. "Love You Less" Released: 2 January 2026; 5. "Last of a Dying Breed" Released: 23 January 2026

Singles from Piss in the Wind (Deluxe)
- 1. "Beautiful" Released: 3 April 2026; 2. "Bluffin'" Released: 4 June 2026

Piss in the Wind is the fourth studio album by Japanese-Australian singer-songwriter Joji, released on 6 February 2026, through Palace Creek and Virgin Music Group. It is his first album release since departing from his former label 88rising. The album features guest appearances from Giveon, 4Batz, Yeat and Don Toliver. The deluxe version was released on June 6, 2026, featuring guest appearances from The Kid LAROI, Anyma, Yeat and Corbin.

== Background and release ==
In October 2025, after a three year hiatus from releasing music, Joji posted a picture of a video billboard in a social media post titled "see u soon". On 14 October 2025, he released the lead single "Pixelated Kisses" alongside a music video. It is his first release under his independent label Palace Creek. On 5 November 2025, he released the album's title and release date, alongside its second single and music video, "If It Only Gets Better". He released the third single, "Past Won't Leave My Bed" on 7 November 2025. On 3 December 2025, a remix of “Pixelated Kisses” with American rapper Yeat was released. He released "Love You Less", the album's fourth single, on 2 January 2026, alongside a 360-degree visualizer. The album's fifth single, "Last of a Dying Breed", was released on 23 January, alongside a visualizer. On 9 February, a joint music video for "Last of a Dying Breed" and "Dior" was released. Two days later, on 11 February, an animated music video for "Forehead Touch the Ground" was released. On 27 February, Joji announced his upcoming Solaris Tour in promotion for the album, with an additional Los Angeles show being announced on March 4th following high demand for his Intuit Dome show on July 11.

=== Look-alike ===
During the album cycle, Joji has used a look-alike, identified as model and actor Robert Birdsall, in place of himself for interviews, press releases, and music videos. On 29 December 2025, he released a video with Genius in which Birdsall, dubbed "Joe G" by fans, explained the lyrics of "Pixelated Kisses".

== Critical reception ==
Professional ratings
Aggregate scores
Source	Rating
Metacritic	66/100
Review scores
Source	Rating
AllMusic	3.5/5 stars
Clash	8/10
Exclaim!	6/10
The Independent	3/5 stars
NME	3/5 stars
Pitchfork	5.9/10

Piss in the Wind received generally favourable reviews from critics. In a positive review, James Mellen of Clash called the album "potentially the most authentic Joji project to date". He described "Pixelated Kisses" as "blown out yet [retaining] a calibre of nostalgia and melancholy", and compared "Love You Less" to the music of Steve Lacy. He also highlighted a "lovely felted piano sound" on "Can't See Sh*t in the Club". However, Mellen also found that some ideas on the album felt "half-realized", as well as feeling that "Past Won't Leave My Bed" did not "cut as deep" as previous ballad-style tracks from Joji.

== Commercial performance ==
In the United States, Piss in the Wind debuted at number five on the Billboard 200, with first-week sales of 86,000 album-equivalent units (45,000 pure album sales and 42.17 million on-demand streams).

== Track listing ==
Piss in the Wind track listing
No.	Title	Writer(s)	Producer(s)	Length
1.	"Pixelated Kisses"	George Miller	Joji	1:50
2.	"Cigarette"	Miller; John Durham; Isaac Sleator	WonTon; Sleator	1:51
3.	"Last of a Dying Breed"	Miller	Joji	2:30
4.	"Love You Less"	Miller; Eric Frederic; Fallon King; Nate Mercereau; Alex Vickery	Ricky Reed; Mercereau	3:21
5.	"If It Only Gets Better"	Miller; Durham	WonTon	1:09
6.	"Love Me Better"	Miller; Durham	Joji; WonTon	1:53
7.	"Piece of You" (with Giveon)	Miller; Kenneth Blume III; Eric Marquise Dugar; Giveon Evans; Lily Kaplan; Jahaan Sweet; Rupert Thomas	Sweet; Sevn Thomas; Ninetyfour; Blume; Aaron Paris^{[a]}	2:15
8.	"Hotel California"	Miller; Joshua Coleman; James Essien; Sam Homaee; Alexander Izquierdo	Homaee	2:09
9.	"Tarmac"	Miller; Durham; Sleator	WonTon; Sleator	1:35
10.	"Forehead Touch the Ground"	Miller; Myles Potters; Sleator	Myles Avery; Sleator	1:57
11.	"Past Won't Leave My Bed"	Miller; Jonathan Cunningham; Dan Farber; Fussy	Farber	2:46
12.	"Fade to Black" (with 4Batz)	Miller; Neko Bennett; Sleator	Joji; Sleator	1:16
13.	"Can't See Sh*t in the Club"	Miller; Sleator	Joji; Sleator	2:52
14.	"Sojourn"	Miller; Blume; Dylan Brady	Brady; Blume; Joji	2:56
15.	"DYKILY"	Miller; Sleator; Durham	Joji; Sleator; WonTon	2:38
16.	"Rose Colored" (with Yeat)	Miller; Benjamin Saint Fort; Lawrence Jung; Sleator; Noah Olivier Smith	Joji; Sleator; Bnyx; West1ne	2:34
17.	"Silhouette Man"	Miller; Durham; Sleator	WonTon; Sleator	1:26
18.	"Fragments" (with Don Toliver)	Miller; Roark Bailey; Gray Hawken; Caleb Toliver; Azul Wynter	Bailey; Wynter	1:59
19.	"Horses to Water"	Miller; Sleator	Joji; Sleator	2:17
20.	"Strange Home"	Miller	Joji	2:50
21.	"Dior"	Miller	Joji	1:54
Total length:				45:58

Bonus track version
No.	Title	Writer(s)	Producer(s)	Length
22.	"DYKILY" (2017 demo version)	Miller	Joji	0:58
Total length:				46:56

Deluxe version
No.	Title	Writer(s)	Producer(s)	Length
23.	"Bluffin'" (with The Kid Laroi)	Miller; Homaee; Charlton Howard; Saint Fort; Leven Kali Simon-Seay; Justin Tranter; Israel Fowobaje	Homaee; Bnyx; 1srael	2:34
24.	"Blah Blah"	Miller; Homaee; Essien; Alexander Glantz	Homaee; Alexander 23	2:42
25.	"Beautiful" (with Anyma)	Miller; David Stewart; Mateo Milleri; Michael Tucker; Conor Ross; Johannes Klahr	Anyma; BloodPop; Andreas Wiman; Dimitri Vangelis; Klahr; Andrew Boyd^{[v]}; Bart Schoudel^{[v]}	3:35
26.	"Back Home" (with Yeat)	Miller; Smith; Lucien Dunne; Stepan Sergeevich; Orin Friedman; Javier Mercado	Orin; Synthetic; Lucid; Gleero	3:14
27.	"Redeeming Qualities" (with Corbin)	Miller; Ray Lawrence Brown; Corbin Smidzik	Joji; Corbin; Rei Brown	3:26
28.	"Kill the Geese"	Miller; Durham; Sleator	Sleator; WonTon	1:58
29.	"Skin Cells"	Miller; Durham	Joji; WonTon	1:45
30.	"FTC"	Miller	Joji	1:56
Total length:				68:06

=== Notes ===
- ^{^[a]} indicates an assistant producer.
- ^{^[v]} indicates a vocal producer.
- On the vinyl version of the album, "Fragments" is omitted, and the track placements of "Rose Colored" and "Silhouette Man" are switched.
- "Pixelated Kisses", "Love You Less", and "Can't See Sh*t in the Club" are stylized in all caps.
- "Skin Cells" is stylized in all lowercase.
- "DYKILY" is an acronym for "Don't You Know I Love You".
- "FTC" is an acronym for "Fuck The Club".
- "Back Home" was previously released as part of Yeat's 2026 album ADL.

== Personnel ==
Credits adapted from liner notes.

- George Miller – vocals (all tracks), engineering (tracks 1, 6, 10, 12, 18, 20), mixing (20, 21)
- Francisco "Frankie" Ramirez – engineering (2–5, 7–9, 11, 13–17, 19, 21-24, 26, 28-30), mixing (28, 30)
- Brian Cruz - engineering (7)
- Yeat - engineering (16), mixing (26)
- Bnyx - engineering (16)
- Antonio "DOPAMINE" Zito - engineering (23)
- Harley Arsenault - engineering (26)
- Jeff Ellis – mixing (1-5, 7-19, 22-24, 27, 29)
- Tristan Hoogland - mixing (6)
- Cassian - mixing (25), mastering (25)
- Ivan Handwerk – mixing assistance
- Trevor Taylor – mixing assistance
- Dale Becker – Mastering (2-24, 26-30)
- Adam Burt – mastering assistance
- Noah McCorkle – mastering assistance

== Charts ==
Chart performance for Piss in the Wind
Chart (2026)	Peak position
Australian Albums (ARIA)	3
Austrian Albums (Ö3 Austria)	4
Belgian Albums (Ultratop Flanders)	50
Belgian Albums (Ultratop Wallonia)	28
Canadian Albums (Billboard)	9
Croatian International Albums (HDU)	27
Danish Albums (Hitlisten)	29
Dutch Albums (Album Top 100)	9
French Albums (SNEP)	23
German Albums (Offizielle Top 100)	4
German Rock & Metal Albums (Offizielle Top 100)	1
Hungarian Albums (MAHASZ)	28
Irish Albums (Official Charts)	37
Irish Independent Albums (IRMA)	4
Italian Albums (FIMI)	63
Japanese Dance & Soul Albums (Oricon)	7
Japanese Download Albums (Billboard Japan)	55
Japanese Western Albums (Oricon)	20
Lithuanian Albums (AGATA)	14
New Zealand Albums (RMNZ)	10
Norwegian Albums (IFPI Norge)	26
Polish Albums (ZPAV)	4
Portuguese Albums (AFP)	15
Scottish Albums (Official Charts)	2
Spanish Albums (Promusicae)	15
Swedish Physical Albums (Sverigetopplistan)	14
Swiss Albums (Schweizer Hitparade)	6
UK Albums (Official Charts)	6
UK Independent Albums (Official Charts)	3
UK R&B Albums (Official Charts)	1
US Billboard 200	5
US Independent Albums (Billboard)	2
US Top Rock & Alternative Albums (Billboard)	1
