= Yukon (Interlude) =

2022 single by Joji

Single by Joji

from the album Smithereens
- Released: 26 August 2022
- Length: 2:21
- Label: 88rising; Warner
- Songwriters: George Miller; Isaac Sleator
- Producers: Joji; Isaac Sleator

Joji singles chronology
"Glimpse of Us" (2022)	"Yukon (Interlude)" (2022)	"Die for You" (2022)

"Yukon (Interlude)" (stylized in all caps) is a song by Japanese-Australian singer Joji, released as the second single from his third studio album, Smithereens (2022), on 26 August 2022.

== Background and release ==
Following the release of the lead single from Smithereens, "Glimpse of Us", Joji officially announced the release date for Smithereens on 26 August 2022, and released the single "Yukon (Interlude)" the same day.

== Composition and lyrics ==
According to the sheet music published by Kobalt Music Group at musicnotes.com, "Yukon (Interlude)" is written in the key of D major and follows a tempo of 84 beats per minute. The vocals in the song span from D5 to B3.

Mariel Abanes of NME stated that the song has Joji sing about "getting back on one's track in life," with the lyrics, "Thank God I was always healing / In a time so slow, I was thinking ’bout us rearranging pieces”.

== Music video ==
The official music video for "Yukon (Interlude)" was released on the same day as the song's release, on 26 August 2022. The video was directed by BRTHR.

Leah Degrazia of Genius described the song's video, stating the video features Joji "skipping on the ocean".

== Charts ==
Chart performance for "Yukon (Interlude)"
Chart (2022)	Peak position
Canadian Hot 100 (Billboard)	95
New Zealand Hot Singles Chart (Recorded Music NZ)	3
US Bubbling Under Hot 100 Singles (Billboard)	12
