= Last of a Dying Breed =

Single by Joji

from the album Piss in the Wind
- Released: 23 January 2026
- Genre: Lo-fi; alternative pop; alternative R&B
- Length: 2:30
- Label: Palace Creek; Virgin
- Songwriter: George Miller
- Producer: Joji

Joji singles chronology
"Love You Less" (2026)	"Last of a Dying Breed" (2026)	"Beautiful" (2026)

"Last of a Dying Breed" is a song by Japanese-Australian singer-songwriter Joji, released as the fifth single from his fourth studio album, Piss in the Wind, on 23 January 2026. It was written and produced by Joji himself. It was released alongside a visualiser featuring model and actor Robert Birdsall, a look-alike that Joji has been using in place of himself throughout the Piss in the Wind album cycle.

Joji first teased the song in December 2025 by sending a floppy disk containing a snippet of the song to fans.

== Composition ==
"Last of a Dying Breed" has been described as lo-fi, alternative pop, and alternative R&B. It has a "sparse" start followed by a syncopated beat, with an "orchestral swell" throughout. The song is characterised by its "inquiring" lyrics, featuring a chorus in which Joji sings, "Do you need me? / Do you feel me?".

== Critical reception ==
Ashanti Meadows of Melodic Magazine described "Last of a Dying Breed" as "haunting and gritty", overall calling it a "restless orchestral lo-fi soundscape". Meadows also highlighted the song's minimal lyrics, feeling that they "[leave] the audience wanting more of the story" behind the track. Stereo Williams of Okayplayer described the song as "dark", "propulsive", and "hypnotic", and stated that it "never loses momentum even as its emotional core doesn't waver". Rafael Bautista of Mega highlighted the song's fast BPM, and described it as "pulsating". Kaya Robertson of Complete Music Update found that the song "balances the melancholy with momentum".

== Charts ==
Chart performance for "Last of a Dying Breed"
Chart (2026)	Peak position
Australian Artist Singles (ARIA)	20
New Zealand Hot Singles (RMNZ)	4
US Bubbling Under Hot 100 (Billboard)	5
US Hot Rock & Alternative Songs (Billboard)	14
