= Pixelated Kisses =

2025 single by Joji

- The cover art for the original version of the song; the remix cover art is the same image but with a yellow hue instead of red.

Single by Joji

from the album Piss in the Wind
- Released: 14 October 2025
- Genre: Alternative R&B; rage; trip hop; industrial
- Length: 1:50: 2:22 (remix)
- Label: Palace Creek; Virgin
- Songwriter: George Miller
- Producer: Joji

Joji singles chronology
| "Die for You" (2022) | "Pixelated Kisses" (2025) | "If It Only Gets Better" (2025) |

"Pixelated Kisses" (stylised in all caps) is a song by Japanese-Australian singer-songwriter Joji, released as the lead single from his fourth studio album, Piss in the Wind, on 14 October 2025. It is his first release under his own record label, Palace Creek, which is distributed by Virgin Music Group.

== Composition ==
"Pixelated Kisses" is an alternative R&B, trip hop, trap, industrial and electronica song, featuring a gritty, distorted, thundering rage beat, (Note: Attributed to multiple references) with "bleak", grinding synths and booming drums. Lyrically, Joji expresses frustration with a long-distance relationship, namely his sense of isolation despite being emotionally close with his partner. The song only consists of a chorus and post-chorus; in the former, he describes feeling distant due to only interacting via technology, while in the latter he wants to know how his partner is actually feeling about their relationship.

== Critical reception ==
Tom Kao of Hypebeast commented that the song's "striking combination of an aggressive instrumental and delicate singing creates a unique and engaging listening experience, embodying Joji's moody, genre-bending artistry." Elijah Pareño of Rolling Stone Philippines described the song as "an icy and psychedelic take into Joji's latest direction" and stated it "feels less like a comeback and more like a quiet reentry to the scene, a reminder of how Joji built a career on mood and emotion rather than spectacle."

== Remix ==
On 3 December 2025, Joji released a remix of the track, featuring American rapper Yeat. On the remix, the track sees Yeat incorporate his "signature melodic sound", while keeping balance, and not clashing with Joji's vocals, showing how the "two clearly have chemistry" with each other.

== Charts ==
Chart performance for "Pixelated Kisses"
| Chart (2025) | Peak position |
|---|---|
| Australia (ARIA) | 54 |
| Canada (Canadian Hot 100) | 44 |
| Global 200 (Billboard) | 35 |
| Greece International (IFPI) | 33 |
| India International (IMI) | 6 |
| Ireland (IRMA) | 50 |
| Latvia Streaming (LaIPA) | 6 |
| Lithuania (AGATA) | 11 |
| Lithuania Airplay (TopHit) | 97 |
| Malaysia (Billboard) | 25 |
| Netherlands (Single Tip) | 19 |
| New Zealand (Recorded Music NZ) | 29 |
| Portugal (AFP) | 108 |
| Singapore Regional (RIAS) | 10 |
| UK Singles (Official Charts) | 37 |
| UK Indie (Official Charts) | 8 |
| US Billboard Hot 100 | 38 |
| US Hot Rock & Alternative Songs (Billboard) | 4 |
