= Run (Joji song) =

Single by Joji

from the album Nectar
- Released: 6 February 2020
- Genre: Alternative rock; R&B
- Length: 3:15
- Label: 88rising
- Songwriters: George Miller; Justin Parker; Daniel Wilson
- Producers: Parker; Miller

Joji singles chronology
"Walking" (2019)	"Run" (2020)	"Gimme Love" (2020)

Music video
- "Run" on YouTube

"Run" is a song by Japanese-Australian singer-songwriter Joji. It was released on 6 February 2020 through 88rising. The track was written by Joji, Daniel Wilson and Justin Parker, with the production duties also completed by Parker. Joji made his American television debut when he performed the song on The Tonight Show Starring Jimmy Fallon on 2 March 2020.

== Composition ==
The track has been described as an atmospheric rock power ballad that features falsetto vocals and guitar solos. Other news articles described the song as R&B. The guitar portion of the song was written and performed by Jaco Caraco.

== Critical reception ==
The song was well received by music critics. Joshua Espinoza of Complex complimented Joji's artistic growth on the track, highlighting his "powerful vocals" and the "haunting, atmospheric" production. Raisa Bruner included the song on Time's list of the 5 best songs of its week of release, opining that "just when you think you know what Joji has in store, he switches it up."

== Charts ==
Chart performance for "Run"
Chart (2020)	Peak position
Australia (ARIA)	39
Canada (Canadian Hot 100)	57
Czech Republic Singles Digital (ČNS IFPI)	60
Hungary (Single Top 40)	37
Ireland (IRMA)	47
Malaysia (RIM)	16
New Zealand Hot Singles (RMNZ)	4
Portugal (AFP)	76
Singapore (RIAS)	25
Slovakia Singles Digital (ČNS IFPI)	45
Sweden Heatseeker (Sverigetopplistan)	4
UK Singles (OCC)	46
US Billboard Hot 100	68
US Alternative Songs (Billboard)	30
US Rolling Stone Top 100	39

== Certifications ==
Certifications for "Run"
Region	Certification	Certified units/sales
New Zealand (RMNZ)	Gold	15,000^{‡}
United States (RIAA)	Platinum	1,000,000^{‡}
^{‡} Sales+streaming figures based on certification alone.
