= Past Won't Leave My Bed =

2025 single by Joji

Single by Joji

from the album Piss in the Wind
- Released: 7 November 2025
- Length: 2:46
- Label: Palace Creek; Virgin
- Songwriters: George Miller; Jonathan Xavier Cunningham; Dan Farber; Veronica Goudie; P.J.A. Williams
- Producer: Farber

Joji singles chronology
"If It Only Gets Better" (2025)	"Past Won't Leave My Bed" (2025)	"Love You Less" (2026)

Music video
- "Past Won't Leave My Bed" on YouTube

"Past Won't Leave My Bed" is a song by Japanese-Australian singer-songwriter Joji, released on 7 November 2025 as the third single from his fourth studio album, Piss in the Wind. It was produced by Dan Farber.

== Composition ==
According to sheet music published on musicnotes.com, "Past Won't Leave My Bed" is written in the key of F major and follows a tempo of 70 beats per minute.

The song is a piano ballad; the production begins with a minimal piano line before developing into a richly textured arrangement, which along with Joji's vocal performance has been described as nuanced. During the chorus, fuzzy guitar chords accompany the piano. Lyrically, the song is about struggling to let go of a past relationship. Joji describes being unable to stop thinking about the past as he is constantly reminded of his ex-girlfriend in his surroundings and finding relief only in sleeping, though he acknowledges its fleeting nature.

== Music video ==
The music video was directed by Ethan Eng and released alongside the single. Filmed in a found footage style, it sees Joji hitchhiking across North America and engaging in dangerous behavior with suspicious people.

== Charts ==
Chart performance for "Past Won't Leave My Bed"
Chart (2025–2026)	Peak position
Australia (ARIA)	100
Canada (Canadian Hot 100)	64
Malaysia (Billboard)	14
Malaysia International (RIM)	15
New Zealand Hot Singles (RMNZ)	2
Philippines Hot 100 (Billboard Philippines)	62
Portugal Airplay (AFP)	88
Singapore (RIAS)	19
US Billboard Hot 100	79
US Hot Rock & Alternative Songs (Billboard)	9
