= Love You Less =

2026 single by Joji

Single by Joji

from the album Piss in the Wind
- Released: 2 January 2026
- Genre: Shoegaze; indie rock; dream pop
- Length: 3:21
- Label: Palace Creek; Virgin
- Songwriters: Eric Frederic; Fallon King; George Miller; Nate Mercereau; Alex Vickery
- Producer: Ricky Reed

Joji singles chronology
"Past Won't Leave My Bed" (2025)	"Love You Less" (2026)	"Last of a Dying Breed" (2026)

"Love You Less" (stylised in all caps) is a song by Japanese-Australian singer-songwriter Joji, released as the fourth single from his fourth studio album, Piss in the Wind, on 2 January 2026. It was produced by Ricky Reed.

== Composition ==
"Love You Less" has been described as shoegaze, indie rock, and dream pop, featuring "swirling" textures, "melancholic" guitars, and steady drum work. Lyrically, the song details Joji's feelings towards an unbalanced, "push-and-pull" romance, with one person being fully committed and the other only growing more distant.

== Critical reception ==
Ken Partridge of Genius compared the song's sound to My Bloody Valentine. Robin Murray of Clash found that the song sees Joji "at his most open" lyrically, and called the song's shoegaze-inspired textures "gorgeous". Elijah Pareño of Rolling Stone Philippines described the song as having a "loose" and "fragile" quality, and found Joji stepping into a different genre to work in his favor.

== Visualizer ==
A 360-degree visualizer was released alongside the song on January 2. The computer-generated video is shown from the perspective of a character "flying through a city under siege" into space, encountering "all sorts of sci-fi and trippy visuals". Ken Partridge of Genius compared the visualizer to a Star Wars video game.

== Charts ==
Chart performance for "Love You Less"
Chart (2026)	Peak position
New Zealand Hot Singles (RMNZ)	2
US Hot Rock & Alternative Songs (Billboard)	26
