= Pink Season: The Prophecy =

Remix album / EP by Pink Guy
- Released: 24 May 2017
- Recorded: 2017
- Genre: EDM
- Length: 27:48
- Label: 88rising
- Producer: Axel Boy; Borgore; Getter; Holder; Ryan Jacob; Pink Guy; TastyTreat

Pink Guy chronology
Pink Season (2017)	Pink Season: The Prophecy (2017)

Pink Season: The Prophecy is a remix extended play by YouTube personality George "Joji" Miller, under the alias Pink Guy. It was released on 24 May 2017 under the 88rising label and features remixes of songs from the album Pink Season. This would be the final release done by George Miller under the Pink Guy alias.

== Track listing ==
Pink Season: The Prophecy
No.	Title	Producer(s)	Length
1.	"Dumplings" (Borgore remix)	George Miller; Holder	2:42
2.	"Fried Noodles" (Getter remix)	Miller	5:52
3.	"STFU" (TastyTreat remix)	Miller; Ryan Jacob	2:08
4.	"Are You Serious" (Axel Boy remix)	Miller; Holder	4:34
5.	"The Prophecy" (featuring Getter, Borgore, Axel Boy, and Tasty Treat)	Miller; Getter; Borgore; Axel Boy; TastyTreat	12:32
Total length:			27:48

== Charts ==
Chart (2017)	Peak position
US Comedy Albums (Billboard)	2
