= Die for You (Joji song) =

Single by Joji

from the album Smithereens
- Released: 4 November 2022
- Length: 3:31
- Label: 88rising; Warner
- Songwriters: Dewain Whitmore Jr.; Jacob Ray; Patrick Smith; Taylor Dexter; Wesley Singerman
- Producers: Jacob Ray; Wesley Singerman; Taydex

Joji singles chronology
"Yukon (Interlude)" (2022)	"Die for You" (2022)	"Pixelated Kisses" (2025)

Music video
- "Die for You" on YouTube

"Die for You" is a song by Japanese-Australian singer Joji. It was released on 4 November 2022, through 88rising and Warner Records, as the third and final single from his third studio album Smithereens, released the same day.

== Music video ==
Directed by Actual Objects, the music video for "Die for You" was released on the same day as the song and album's release, on 4 November 2022.

== Charts ==
Chart performance for "Die for You"
Chart (2022)	Peak position
Australia (ARIA)	38
Canada (Canadian Hot 100)	43
Global 200 (Billboard)	34
Ireland (IRMA)	34
Malaysia (Billboard)	1
Malaysia International (RIM)	1
New Zealand (Recorded Music NZ)	32
Philippines (Billboard)	16
Singapore (RIAS)	2
Sweden (Sverigetopplistan)	80
UK Singles (OCC)	27
US Billboard Hot 100	53
US Hot Rock & Alternative Songs (Billboard)	5
US Pop Airplay (Billboard)	25
Vietnam (Vietnam Hot 100)	11

== Certifications ==
Certifications for "Die for You"
Region	Certification	Certified units/sales
New Zealand (RMNZ)	Gold	15,000^{‡}
^{‡} Sales+streaming figures based on certification alone.
