= In Tongues (EP) =

EP by Joji
- Released: 3 November 2017
- Recorded: 2016–17
- Genres: Trip hop; lo-fi; alternative R&B
- Length: 16:38 (standard); 54:16 (deluxe)
- Labels: Empire; 88rising
- Producers: Joji; West1ne

Joji chronology
Chloe Burbank: Volume 1 (2016)	In Tongues (2017)	Ballads 1 (2018)

Deluxe edition cover

Singles from In Tongues
- 1. "Will He" Released: 17 October 2017

In Tongues is the debut extended play by Japanese-Australian singer-songwriter Joji. It was released on 3 November 2017, through 88rising and Empire. A deluxe version of the project was released on 14 February 2018.

== Background ==
In late 2015, the songs "Thom" and "you suck charlie" were leaked onto the internet and prompted Miller, in January 2016, to publicly announce his discontent on a post on Instagram. Miller mentioned that the purpose of the "unknown account" that contained these songs was for the enjoyment of him and his friends. He intended to keep the music a secret from his fanbase as they mainly focused on his comedic music. However, when the account in question was discovered and its music was reuploaded to platforms like YouTube, he felt he had no control over his "own image or identity" and decided to continue his music career under his original stage name. In addition, he linked his Joji SoundCloud account and also announced that he would be releasing a full-length commercial project titled Chloe Burbank: Volume 1 with "Thom" and "you suck charlie" serving as singles. After this, he started to upload more songs onto his SoundCloud.

After the release of his album Pink Season under the Pink Guy persona, which debuted atop the iTunes charts and at number 70 on the Billboard 200, he sat down in an interview with Pigeons and Planes and mentioned the reason he has kept using the different pseudonyms saying, "I was doing music way before the Filthy Frank stuff, I've always wanted to make normal music. I just started the YouTube channel to kind of bump my music. But then Filthy Frank and the Pink Guy stuff ended up getting way bigger than I thought so I had to kind of roll with it."

In December 2016 and January 2017, songs under Joji started to be uploaded onto the 88rising channel, indicating a partnership between Miller and 88rising on future projects. In mid-2017, he released "i dont wanna waste my time" and "rain on me" onto his SoundCloud and on the 88rising channel. In an interview, Miller noted that he had been "making beats and working on a few big projects" and hinted at a full-length Joji project being released.

== Promotion and singles ==
Miller had previously released his song, "Worldstar Money", on his SoundCloud in April 2016. The lead single from In Tongues titled "Will He" was released on 17 October 2017 accompanied by the music video. The song quickly went to the top of Spotify's Global "Viral" chart and remained there until the release of In Tongues on 3 November 2017. Joji had originally announced an upcoming EP on Complex's Hot Ones series where celebrities would eat buffalo wings that would increasingly get hotter. The release date was muted in the final version of the video after his manager disapproved with announcing the release date. Following the release of the lead single for In Tongues, "Will He" on 17 October 2017, Joji published the cover to In Tongues on his Twitter account before posting the pre-order link to the album the following day.

A music video for "Demons" was released to the 88rising YouTube channel on 6 December 2017 and for "Window" on 24 January 2018, having teased the latter one back in November 2017. Although not being featured in the track listings for the EP, the songs "Plastic Taste", which was released in 2016, and "I Don't Wanna Waste My Time", which was released in 2017, were released exclusively on the deluxe version.

== Release and reception ==
Professional ratings
Review scores
Source	Rating
Pitchfork	5.2/10

In Tongues was released on 3 November 2017 on iTunes, Apple Music, Spotify and Google Play. It was also re-released as a deluxe version on February 14, 2018, with the addition of the tracks "Plastic Taste" and "I Don't Wanna Waste My Time", along with 8 remixes of tracks from the EP.

Pitchfork reviewed the album saying that, "The former YouTube star's debut EP establishes a decent R&B mood but proceeds to wallow in thin, underdeveloped emotions."

== Track listing ==
All tracks written and produced by Joji, except where noted.

In Tongues – Standard version
No.	Title	Writer(s)	Producer(s)	Length
1.	"Will He"	George Miller; Lawrence Jung	West1ne; Joji	3:22
2.	"Pills"			3:07
3.	"Demons"			2:57
4.	"Window"			2:32
5.	"Bitter Fuck"			2:34
6.	"Worldstar Money" (interlude)			2:06
Total length:				16:38

In Tongues – Deluxe version (bonus tracks)
No.	Title	Length
7.	"Plastic Taste"	2:00
8.	"I Don't Wanna Waste My Time"	2:44
9.	"Will He" (Medasin remix)	3:42
10.	"Will He" (Ryan Hemsworth remix)	2:48
11.	"Demons" (Lapalux remix)	2:12
12.	"Demons" (Lunice remix)	4:20
13.	"Window" (Actress remix)	9:15
14.	"Pills" (HWLS remix)	3:21
15.	"Bitter Fuck" (Salute remix)	3:36
16.	"I Don't Wanna Waste My Time" (Swum remix)	3:36
Total length:		54:11

== Charts ==
Chart performance for In Tongues
Chart (2017)	Peak position
Canadian Albums (Billboard)	62
New Zealand Albums (RMNZ)	38
Scottish Albums (Official Charts)	77
US Billboard 200	58
US Top R&B/Hip-Hop Albums (Billboard)	28

== Certifications ==
Certifications for In Tongues
Region	Certification	Certified units/sales
Canada (Music Canada)	Gold	40,000^{‡}
New Zealand (RMNZ)	Gold	7,500^{‡}
^{‡} Sales+streaming figures based on certification alone.
