= Yeah Right (Joji song) =

Single by Joji

from the album Ballads 1
- Released: 8 May 2018
- Genre: R&B; lo-fi; downtempo; emo
- Length: 2:54
- Label: 88rising; 12Tone
- Songwriter: George Miller
- Producer: George Miller

Joji singles chronology
"18" (2018)	"Yeah Right" (2018)	"Slow Dancing in the Dark" (2018)

Music video
- "Yeah Right" on YouTube

"Yeah Right" (stylized in all caps) is a song written, produced, and performed by Japanese-Australian singer-songwriter Joji from his debut studio album, Ballads 1. The song was solely written and produced by Joji, and was released on 8 May 2018, as the album's lead single.

== Charts ==
Chart performance for "Yeah Right"
Chart (2018–2021)	Peak position
Lithuania (AGATA)	89
New Zealand Hot Singles (RMNZ)	38
US Hot R&B/Hip-Hop Songs (Billboard)	21

== Certifications ==
Certifications for "Yeah Right"
Region	Certification	Certified units/sales
France (SNEP)	Gold	100,000^{‡}
New Zealand (RMNZ)	2× Platinum	60,000^{‡}
Poland (ZPAV)	Gold	25,000^{‡}
Portugal (AFP)	Gold	5,000^{‡}
United Kingdom (BPI)	Gold	400,000^{‡}
United States (RIAA)	2× Platinum	2,000,000^{‡}
^{‡} Sales+streaming figures based on certification alone.
