= Pink Season =

Studio album by Pink Guy
- Released: 4 January 2017
- Recorded: 2014–2016
- Genres: Comedy hip-hop; parody; dirty rap; trap; trip hop; lo-fi
- Length: 81:17
- Languages: English; Japanese
- Producers: Holder; Ryan Jacob; Misogi; Josh Pan; Pink Guy

Pink Guy chronology
PINK GUY (2014)	Pink Season (2017)	Pink Season: The Prophecy (2017)

Singles from Pink Season
- 1. "Dumplings" Released: 4 June 2015; 2. "Meme Machine" Released: 12 July 2015; 3. "We Fall Again" Released: 28 August 2015; 4. "Rice Balls" Released: 31 December 2015; 5. "Hand On My Gat" Released: 11 April 2016; 6. "Fried Noodles" Released: 8 May 2016; 7. "Furr" Released: 21 June 2016; 8. "Pink Life" Released: 21 August 2016; 9. "STFU" Released: 23 September 2016; 10. "Gays 4 Donald" Released: 2 November 2016; 11. "Nickelodeon Girls" Released: 13 March 2017

Pink Season is the only studio album by Pink Guy, a character played by Japanese-Australian YouTuber and musician George "Joji" Miller. It was released on 4 January 2017. It features 35 songs ranging from various points in his YouTube career and is primarily produced by Miller himself. It peaked at number 70 on the Billboard 200.

== Background and release ==
Pink Guy – "STFU"
This track illustrates the type of humour used in the album.

George "Joji" Miller, the creator and player of Filthy Frank, has always loved to create music as he elaborates in an interview with Pigeons and Planes. Miller started creating YouTube content as Filthy Frank, initially with the intention to promote his music, but would eventually start gaining popularity with videos featuring his character. As his channel grew, he created more characters, most notably Pink Guy, a character consisting of Miller in a pink body suit. Periodically, Miller would upload music videos to his channel in his Pink Guy character, with their content ranging from him making rice balls to his adoration of hentai.

In 2014, he released a collection of a select number of songs, titled Pink Guy (stylized in all caps), compiled under the Pink Guy pseudonym. After the release, Miller went back to his normal uploading schedule.

Throughout mid-2016, he hinted at the release of Pink Season in several of his videos. He continued to hype up his album by promoting on Twitter up until its release.

After the album's release, a music video was released for the song "Nickelodeon Girls" on 13 March 2017.

A remix EP titled Pink Season: The Prophecy was released on 24 May 2017, featuring remixes by Borgore, Getter, Tasty Treat and Axel Boy.

An unnamed third album was planned by Miller, along with a "long overdue" tour as the character. However, on 29 December 2017, Miller announced he had ceased making Filthy Frank content, including music as Pink Guy.

== Track listing ==
All songs are written and produced by George Miller, except where noted.

Pink Season track listing
No.	Title	Producer(s)	Length
1.	"Hot Nickel Ball on a Pussy"		2:19
2.	"Are You Serious"	Holder	2:29
3.	"White Is Right"		2:00
4.	"I Have a Gun" (performed by Politikz)		1:50
5.	"Nickelodeon Girls"	Josh Pan; Eric North	3:08
6.	"STFU"	Miller; Ryan Jacob	3:44
7.	"Gays 4 Donald"		3:04
8.	"I Do It for My Hood" (performed by Politikz)		1:55
9.	"Please Stop Calling Me Gay"		2:19
10.	"She's So Nice"		2:43
11.	"Please Stop Touching My Willy"		0:28
12.	"Uber Pussy"		1:57
13.	"セックス大好き" (Sekkusu Daisuki, "I Love Sex")		2:22
14.	"Dumplings"	Holder	2:18
15.	"Meme Machine"		2:10
16.	"Hand on My Gat" (performed by Politikz)		4:23
17.	"D I C C W E T T 1"		0:53
18.	"Flex Like David Icke"		2:40
19.	"High School Blink193"		1:38
20.	"Rice Balls"		3:16
21.	"Dora the Explora"		2:24
22.	"SMD"	Holder	1:49
23.	"Dog Festival Directions"		2:42
24.	"We Fall Again"		1:42
25.	"Club Banger 3000"		1:17
26.	"Help"		2:45
27.	"Hentai"		1:29
28.	"Small Dick"	Misogi	2:12
29.	"Pink Life"	Holder	3:10
30.	"Another Earth"		2:12
31.	"I Will Get a Vasectomy"		2:58
32.	"Furr"		2:04
33.	"Fried Noodles"		2:50
34.	"Goofy's Trial"		2:46
35.	"Be Inspired"		1:05
Total length:			81:17

Notes

- On Filthy Frank's YouTube upload of the album, "Another Earth" was originally subtitled "Young Thug Diss".
- For the tracks "Hand on My Gat", "I Do It for My Hood" and "I Have a Gun", Miller uses the pseudonym PolitikZ, an underground internet rapper character on the Filthy Frank Show.
- After the album's initial release, the third track, "White Is Right", was removed from the iTunes Store, Google Play and Spotify. The original video for the song on YouTube has also been unlisted. No official reason has been given for this removal, though it can be assumed it was due to the song's lyrical content.
- A year after the album's release, in early January 2018, the track "Dog Festival Directions" was removed from the iTunes Store, Google Play, Spotify and YouTube. No official reason has been given for this removal; however, this came after Miller announced retiring from comedy to pursue his music career. However, on May 18, 2022, the audio was reuploaded onto the "Pink Guy - Topic" channel. It has yet to be reuploaded onto any streaming services.
- The track "We Fall Again", used to be called "wefllagn.ii 5", which later got renamed for the album.
- The streaming service version of "Hand on My Gat" ends at 1:32 followed by minutes of silence until at the very end an unreleased snippet from his Joji moniker plays.

== Charts ==
Chart performance for Pink Season
Chart (2017)	Peak position
Canadian Albums (Billboard)	61
Finnish Albums (Suomen virallinen lista)	46
Dutch Albums (Album Top 100)	157
New Zealand Albums (RMNZ)	3
Norwegian Albums (VG-lista)	38
UK Album Downloads (Official Charts)	56
UK Independent Albums (Official Charts)	24
US Billboard 200	70
US Top R&B/Hip-Hop Albums (Billboard)	9
US Top Comedy Albums (Billboard)	1
US Independent Albums (Billboard)	2
