= Glimpse of Us =

Single by Joji

from the album Smithereens
- Released: 10 June 2022
- Genre: Pop
- Length: 3:53
- Label: 88rising; Warner
- Songwriters: Alexis Kesselman; Castle; Connor McDonough; Riley McDonough
- Producer: Connor McDonough

Joji singles chronology
"Thinking Bout You" (2022)	"Glimpse of Us" (2022)	"Yukon (Interlude)" (2022)

Music video
- "Glimpse of Us" on YouTube

"Glimpse of Us" is a song by Japanese-Australian singer Joji, released as the lead single from his third studio album Smithereens on 10 June 2022 through 88rising and Warner Records. It was written by Alexis Kesselman, Castle, Riley McDonough, and producer Connor McDonough. The song became Joji's most successful hit single to date, having peaked at number one in Australia, Indonesia, Lithuania, Malaysia, New Zealand, the Philippines, and Singapore, number two on the Global 200, and within the top 10 in Canada, Ireland, Norway, the United States, and Vietnam.

Following its release, "Glimpse of Us" broke a series of records. It became the first song by an Asian artist to reach number one on Spotify's Global chart, remaining there for 10 consecutive days. With the song's debut in tenth place on the Billboard Hot 100, it became the second song by a Japanese artist to reach the top 10 after Kyu Sakamoto's "Sukiyaki" in 1963. It also marked the first debut of an Asian soloist directly in the top 10, as well as his fifth entry on the chart. The song also topped the New Zealand and Australian singles, becoming Joji's first number-one single. The song received a nomination for Song of the Year at the ARIA Awards 2022 in Australia, due to Joji being half Australian on his father's side.

== Background ==
The murder of the American singer Christina Grimmie in 2016 had a severe impact on one of the song's writers close to Grimmie, Riley McDonough. The idea of "Glimpse of Us" was first concepted on 14 June 2019, where he was struggling and to him, "life just didn't make any sense." He then made a voice memo, stating that he "[called] out to God, [asking], 'If I could only catch a glimpse of you.' " During a writing session with Connor McDonough, Castle, and Alexis Kesselman, he found the voice memo titled "Glimpse", and the song was written that day. Two years later, Joji heard the song, and made his own changes before the song's final version.

While on tour, Charlie Puth was sent the song, and had planned on returning to it, but the final version by Joji had been released two weeks later.

== Composition and lyrics ==
The sheet music, published by Kobalt Music Publishing on Musicnotes.com, shows that the song is written in the key of A-flat major, with a tempo of 57 beats per minute. Joji's vocals in the song span from the low note of B♭2 to the high note of A♭4.

The song's lyrics express the conflict of Joji's longing for his ex-lover, even though he is in a relationship with another woman, who has shown tons of affection to him, and is "perfect".

== Critical reception ==
The song received widespread acclaim, with critics praising its simplicity, lyrics, and Joji's emotional vocals. Brenton Blanchet of Complex described the song as a "chilling piano ballad", while Jon Caramanica of The New York Times considered it "splendid and striking". Andrea See of Bandwagon Asia felt that the "stripped-down" sound of the song "foreshadows Joji's more mature sonic territory" in contrast to his previous electronic material.

== Music video ==
The song was accompanied by its music video, directed by Dan Streit. The video contains various scenes of destructive antics committed by "anonymous protagonists," including in race cars. Clips from the video became popular on TikTok, leading the music video to gain tens of millions of views. The video was shot on a Sony DCR-HC32 miniDV and consisted of 15 hours of raw footage before editing. The video was primarily shot in Atlanta, with additional scenes shot in Tennessee, Alabama, Los Angeles, and New York.

== Commercial performance ==
"Glimpse of Us" became Joji's highest-charting single upon its debut in various countries, including Australia, New Zealand, the Philippines, and the UK. It debuted at number ten on the US Billboard Hot 100, marking Joji's first top-ten single in the country. For the chart dated 2 July 2022, the song peaked at number eight.

With "Glimpse of Us", Joji became the second Japanese artist to have a number one single on the Australian singles chart, and first since Kyu Sakamoto's "Sukiyaki" in 1963.

== Charts ==
=== Weekly charts ===
Weekly chart performance of "Glimpse of Us"
Chart (2022)	Peak position
Australia (ARIA)	1
Austria (Ö3 Austria Top 40)	13
Belgium (Ultratop 50 Flanders)	42
Canada (Canadian Hot 100)	5
Croatia (Billboard)	15
Czech Republic Singles Digital (ČNS IFPI)	17
Denmark (Tracklisten)	12
Finland (Suomen virallinen lista)	12
France (SNEP)	57
Germany (GfK)	31
Global 200 (Billboard)	2
Greece International (IFPI)	2
Hong Kong (Billboard)	15
Hungary (Single Top 40)	30
Hungary (Stream Top 40)	24
Iceland (Tónlistinn)	4
India International Singles (IMI)	4
Indonesia (Billboard)	1
Ireland (IRMA)	2
Italy (FIMI)	90
Lithuania (AGATA)	1
Malaysia (Billboard)	1
Malaysia International (RIM)	1
Netherlands (Single Top 100)	13
New Zealand (Recorded Music NZ)	1
Norway (VG-lista)	5
Philippines (Billboard)	1
Poland Airplay (ZPAV)	71
Portugal (AFP)	4
Romania (Billboard)	24
Singapore (RIAS)	1
Slovakia (Singles Digitál Top 100)	11
South Africa Streaming (TOSAC)	18
Sweden (Sverigetopplistan)	13
Switzerland (Schweizer Hitparade)	13
UK Singles (Official Charts)	12
US Billboard Hot 100	8
US Adult Pop Airplay (Billboard)	13
US Pop Airplay (Billboard)	9
Vietnam (Vietnam Hot 100)	2

=== Year-end charts ===
2022 year-end chart performance for "Glimpse of Us"
Chart (2022)	Position
Australia (ARIA)	26
Belgium (Ultratop 50 Flanders)	191
Canada (Canadian Hot 100)	39
Global 200 (Billboard)	50
Lithuania (AGATA)	15
New Zealand (Recorded Music NZ)	28
Singapore (RIAS)	2
Switzerland (Schweizer Hitparade)	68
US Billboard Hot 100	52
US Adult Top 40 (Billboard)	47
US Mainstream Top 40 (Billboard)	37
Vietnam (Vietnam Hot 100)	26

2023 year-end chart performance for "Glimpse of Us"
Chart (2023)	Position
Global 200 (Billboard)	192

== Certifications ==
Certifications for "Glimpse of Us"
Region	Certification	Certified units/sales
Australia (ARIA)	2× Platinum	140,000^{‡}
Austria (IFPI Austria)	Gold	15,000^{‡}
Canada (Music Canada)	2× Platinum	160,000^{‡}
Denmark (IFPI Danmark)	Platinum	90,000^{‡}
France (SNEP)	Platinum	200,000^{‡}
Italy (FIMI)	Platinum	100,000^{‡}
New Zealand (RMNZ)	3× Platinum	90,000^{‡}
Poland (ZPAV)	Platinum	50,000^{‡}
Portugal (AFP)	3× Platinum	30,000^{‡}
Spain (Promusicae)	Platinum	60,000^{‡}
Switzerland (IFPI Switzerland)	Platinum	20,000^{‡}
United Kingdom (BPI)	Platinum	600,000^{‡}
United States (RIAA)	2× Platinum	2,000,000^{‡}
^{‡} Sales+streaming figures based on certification alone.

== See also ==
- List of most-streamed songs on Spotify
- List of Billboard Hot 100 top-ten singles in 2022
- List of number-one singles of 2022 (Australia)
- List of number-one songs of 2022 (Singapore)
- List of number-one singles from the 2020s (New Zealand)
