= Smithereens (album) =

Studio album by Joji
- Released: 4 November 2022
- Genres: Alternative R&B; alt-pop; bedroom pop; trap-soul
- Length: 24:21
- Labels: 88rising; Warner
- Producers: Joji; Isaac Sleator; Connor McDonough; Whethan; Bekon; Jacob Ray; Taydex; Justin Parker; Suburban Plaza; Benjamin Bailey; Aaron Reyes; Wonton Jesus; Wesley Singerman; Daniel Krieger; Tim Randolph; The Donuts

Joji chronology
Nectar (2020)	Smithereens (2022)	Piss in the Wind (2026)

Singles from Smithereens
- 1. "Glimpse of Us" Released: 10 June 2022; 2. "Yukon (Interlude)" Released: 26 August 2022; 3. "Die for You" Released: 4 November 2022

Smithereens (stylized in all caps) is the third studio album by Japanese-Australian singer-songwriter Joji, released on 4 November 2022, through 88rising and Warner Records. It was preceded by the singles "Glimpse of Us" and "Yukon (Interlude)". Joji toured North America in promotion of the record from September 2022 to 2023.

== Background ==
The album is divided into two sides, with the first side containing "introspective ballads", while the second side, co-produced by Joji, contains "lo-fi, D.I.Y. sounds". Joji announced the Smithereens Tour over two months ahead of the album alongside the release of the lead single "Glimpse of Us", before officially announcing the album title and release date on 26 August 2022.

== Promotion ==
=== Singles ===
"Glimpse of Us" was released as the lead single from Smithereens on 10 June 2022, alongside its accompanying music video, directed by Dan Streit. The song subsequently peaked atop the charts in Australia and New Zealand.

"Yukon (Interlude)" was released as the second single, alongside the official announcement of the album on 26 August 2022. Its music video was released on the same day, directed by BRTHR.

"Die for You" was released as the third and final single on 4 November 2022, alongside the album's release. Its music video was released on the same day, directed by Actual Objects.

=== Tour ===
On June 10, 2022, Joji announced the first leg of the Smithereens Tour, in support of the album. It began on September 1, 2022, and ended on August 17, 2023.

== Critical reception ==
Professional ratings
Review scores
Source	Rating
AllMusic	4.5/5 stars
Clash	8/10
The Line of Best Fit	5/10

Smithereens received generally positive reviews from music critics. Alex Nguyen of The Line of Best Fit complimented Joji's "vulnerability" and his "vocal performance" on "Glimpse of Us", but found the album overall to have "the same consistency problems as Nectar", "whether it's an underdeveloped track or one that meanders in a directionless fashion", along with being "less sonically adventurous than its predecessor, instead sticking to Miller's usual hazy synths and drum machines". Nguyen concluded that Smithereens has "the capacity to be great but stumbles due to run-of-the-mill production [and] impassive vocal delivery."

Neil Z. Yeung from AllMusic wrote, "Clocking in at under 30 minutes, Smithereens is the perfect length to wallow in sadness before wiping off the tears and carrying on. It's not the happiest of experiences, but it is his most mature and relatable statement to date."

Reviewing the album for Clash, James Mellen wrote that "Joji consistently reinvents himself and truly proves himself as one of the most interesting artists in the alternative, 'anti' pop sphere", calling the album a "concise, refined slice of that classic Joji sound, elevated by stronger songwriting and production choices".

== Track listing ==
The album is divided into two parts, with five tracks on the first "part", and four on the second.

Smithereens Part 1
No.	Title	Writer(s)	Producer(s)	Length
1.	"Glimpse of Us"	Alexis Kesselman; Connor McDonough; Riley McDonough; Castle	C. McDonough	3:53
2.	"Feeling Like the End"	Keith Varon; Lauren Sanderson; Suburban Plaza; Tim Randolph; Whethan	Randolph; Whethan	1:42
3.	"Die for You"	Dewain Whitmore Jr.; Jacob Ray; Patrick Smith; Taylor Dexter; Wesley Singerman	Ray; Singerman; Taydex	3:32
4.	"Before the Day Is Over"	Justin Parker; Sam Dew	Parker	3:34
5.	"Dissolve"	Benjamin Bailey; Derrell Jackson; Suburban Plaza	Suburban Plaza; Bailey	2:57
Total length:				15:38

Smithereens Part 2
No.	Title	Writer(s)	Producer(s)	Length
6.	"Night Rider"	George Miller; Isaac Sleator	Joji; Sleator^{[a]}	2:08
7.	"BlahBlahBlah Demo"	Miller; Aaron Reyes; Wonton Jesus	Reyes; Wonton Jesus	2:23
8.	"Yukon (Interlude)"	Miller; Sleator	Joji; Sleator	2:21
9.	"1AM Freestyle"	Christopher Cleere; Daniel Krieger; Daniel Tannenbaum; Joseph Verdi; Marius Feder; Sergiu Gherman; Tyler Mehlenbacher; Vincent Verdi	Bekon; Krieger; The Donuts	1:53
Total length:				8:45

Notes

- ^{^[a]}indicates an additional producer

== Personnel ==
- Joji – vocals
- Dale Becker – mastering
- Jeff Ellis – mixing (1, 3, 4)
- Tristan Hoogland – mixing (2, 5–9)
- Trevor Taylor – mix engineering (1, 3, 4)
- Francisco "Frankie" Ramirez – recording (all tracks)
- Noah McCorkle – mastering assistance (1, 3–9)
- Connor Hedge – mastering assistance (1, 2)
- Katie Harvey – mastering assistance (2–9)
- Ivan Handwerk – mixing assistance (1, 3, 4)
- Hamish Patrick – mixing assistance (2, 5–9)
- Joe Begalla – mixing assistance (2, 5–9)

== Charts ==
Weekly chart performance for Smithereens
Chart (2022–2023)	Peak position
Australian Albums (ARIA)	3
Austrian Albums (Ö3 Austria)	18
Belgian Albums (Ultratop Flanders)	27
Belgian Albums (Ultratop Wallonia)	74
Canadian Albums (Billboard)	3
Danish Albums (Hitlisten)	25
Dutch Albums (Album Top 100)	23
Finnish Albums (Suomen virallinen lista)	12
French Albums (SNEP)	61
German Albums (Offizielle Top 100)	49
Hungarian Albums (MAHASZ)	15
Irish Albums (Official Charts)	15
Italian Albums (FIMI)	53
Lithuanian Albums (AGATA)	2
New Zealand Albums (RMNZ)	3
Norwegian Albums (VG-lista)	4
Scottish Albums (Official Charts)	29
Spanish Albums (Promusicae)	28
Swedish Albums (Sverigetopplistan)	11
Swiss Albums (Schweizer Hitparade)	29
UK Albums (Official Charts)	13
US Billboard 200	5
US Top Alternative Albums (Billboard)	1
US Top Rock Albums (Billboard)	1

== Certifications ==
Certifications for Smithereens
Region	Certification	Certified units/sales
New Zealand (RMNZ)	Gold	7,500^{‡}
United States (RIAA)	Gold	500,000^{‡}
^{‡} Sales+streaming figures based on certification alone.
