= Gimme Love (Joji song) =

2020 song by Joji

Single by Joji

from the album Nectar
- Released: 16 April 2020
- Genre: Pop
- Length: 3:34
- Label: 88rising
- Songwriters: George Miller; Daniel Tannenbaum; Sergiu Gherman; Tyler Mehlenbacher; Daniel Krieger
- Producers: Miller; Bēkon; The Donuts

Joji singles chronology
"Run" (2020)	"Gimme Love" (2020)	"Daylight" (2020)

Music video
- "Gimme Love" on YouTube

"Gimme Love" is a song by Japanese-Australian singer-songwriter Joji. It was released on 16 April 2020 through 88rising, as the third single from Joji's second studio album Nectar (2020).

== Composition ==
The track is composed of two parts. The first half, produced by Joji, is described as a "sticky pop anthem with haunting vocals", while the second half, produced by Bēkon and The Donuts, is described as "somber" and "orchestral".

== Charts ==
=== Weekly charts ===
Weekly chart performance for "Gimme Love"
Chart (2020)	Peak position
Australia (ARIA)	68
Canada (Canadian Hot 100)	82
Ireland (IRMA)	90
New Zealand Hot Singles (RMNZ)	4
UK Singles (Official Charts)	86
US Bubbling Under Hot 100 (Billboard)	1
US Hot Rock & Alternative Songs (Billboard)	12

=== Year-end charts ===
Year-end chart performance for "Gimme Love"
Chart (2020)	Position
US Hot Rock & Alternative Songs (Billboard)	32

== Certifications ==
Certifications for "Gimme Love"
Region	Certification	Certified units/sales
New Zealand (RMNZ)	Gold	15,000^{‡}
Poland (ZPAV)	Gold	25,000^{‡}
United Kingdom (BPI)	Silver	200,000^{‡}
United States (RIAA)	Gold	500,000^{‡}
^{‡} Sales+streaming figures based on certification alone.
