= Nectar (Joji album) =

Studio album by Joji
- Released: 25 September 2020
- Genre: R&B
- Length: 53:15
- Labels: 88rising; 12Tone
- Producers: Bēkon; Clams Casino; Diplo; The Donuts; George Miller; Greg Kurstin; Isaac Sleator; James Alan Ghaleb; Jim-E Stack; John Durham; Josh Taffel; Justin Parker; Justin Raisen; Kenny Beats; Kurtis McKenzie; Lentz Martin; Linden Jay; Maximilian Jaeger; Patrick Wimberly; Reske; Du'Lanci Vallie; Rickard Göransson; Rogét Chahayed; Stint; Suburban Plaza; Tobias Karlsson; West1ne; Yves Tumor

Joji chronology
Ballads 1 (2018)	Nectar (2020)	Smithereens (2022)

Singles from Nectar
- 1. "Sanctuary" Released: 14 June 2019; 2. "Run" Released: 6 February 2020; 3. "Gimme Love" Released: 16 April 2020; 4. "Daylight" Released: 6 August 2020; 5. "Your Man" Released: 20 October 2020

Professional ratings
Review scores
Source	Rating
AllMusic	4/5 stars
Slant Magazine	2.5/5 stars
The Sydney Morning Herald	4/5 stars

Nectar is the second studio album by Japanese-Australian singer Joji, released on 25 September 2020 via 88rising. It features the singles "Sanctuary", "Run", "Gimme Love", "Daylight" with Diplo, and "Your Man", as well as collaborations with Benee, Lil Yachty, Omar Apollo, Yves Tumor and Rei Brown.

== Background ==
The album was announced on 17 April 2020 with the single "Gimme Love". It was originally set to be released on 10 July 2020; however, on 12 June 2020 Joji announced that the album had been delayed to 25 September 2020, citing the COVID-19 pandemic. Joji revealed the track listing on 11 September.

== Composition ==
Musically, Nectar is an R&B record, that incorporates elements of rock, alternative pop, and alternative R&B.

In an interview with GQ, Joji revealed how the album's title was chosen, which first came to his mind after finding dead ants in his freezer and joking about titling the album Nectar. He intended to make love songs with a "slightly darker twist" for the album, and additionally created songs such as "Pretty Boy" to discuss different topics, including materialism.

== Promotion ==
=== Singles ===
On 14 June 2019, "Sanctuary" was released on streaming services, as the album's lead single. The song peaked at number 80 on the Billboard Hot 100, becoming his second entry on the chart. Its music video was released alongside the song.

On 6 February 2020, the album's second single, "Run", was released. The song peaked at number 68 on the Billboard Hot 100. Its music video was released alongside the song.

On 16 April 2020, the album's third single, "Gimme Love" was released, alongside the announcement of Nectar. Its music video was released the same day.

The album's fourth single, "Daylight", was released on 6 August 2020. Its music video was released the same day.

"Your Man" was sent to the contemporary hit radio format on 20 October 2020, as the album's fifth and final single.

== Track listing ==
Nectar track listing
No.	Title	Writer(s)	Producer(s)	Length
1.	"Ew"	George Miller; Daniel Tannenbaum; Tyler Reese Mehlenbacher; Craig Balmoris; Lucas Szulansky; Antoine Norwood; Daniel Nathan Krieger; Stuart Daniel Johnson	Bēkon; The Donuts	3:28
2.	"Modus"	Miller; Ajay Bhattacharyya	Stint	3:27
3.	"Tick Tock"	Miller; Lawrence Jung	West1ne	2:12
4.	"Daylight" (with Diplo)	Miller; Thomas Wesley Pentz; Maximillian Jaeger; Sarah Aarons; Greg Kurstin	Diplo; Jaeger; Kurstin	2:44
5.	"Upgrade"	Miller; Rickard Göransson; Tobias Karlsson; James Alan Ghaleb	Miller; Göransson; Karlsson; Ghaleb	1:30
6.	"Gimme Love"	Miller; Tannenbaum; Mehlenbacher; Sergiu Adrian Gherman; Krieger	Miller; Bekon; The Donuts	3:35
7.	"Run"	Miller; Daniel Wilson; Justin Parker	Miller; Parker; Stacy Jones^{[a]}	3:15
8.	"Sanctuary"	Miller; Wilson; Luke Niccoli; Justin Raisen	Raisen	3:00
9.	"High Hopes" (featuring Omar Apollo)	Miller; Omar Velasco; Wilson; Tannenbaum; Mehlenbacher	Bekon; The Donuts	3:02
10.	"Nitrous"	Miller; Michael Volpe; Rogét Chahayed	Clams Casino; Chahayed	2:12
11.	"Pretty Boy" (featuring Lil Yachty)	Miller; Miles McCollum; Patrick Wimberly; John Durham	Miller; Wimberly; Durham	2:37
12.	"Normal People" (featuring Rei Brown)	Miller; Rei Brown; Isaac Cords Sleator	Miller; Sleator	2:47
13.	"Afterthought" (with Benee)	Miller; Stella Rose Bennett; Wilson; Sleator	Miller; Sleator	3:15
14.	"Mr. Hollywood"	Miller; Kenneth Charles Blume III; Jung	Miller; Kenny Beats; West1ne	3:22
15.	"777"	Miller; A. Norwood; Stephen Norwood; Deon Knight Jr.; Daniel Dalexis	Suburban Plaza; Lentz Martin	3:02
16.	"Reanimator" (featuring Yves Tumor)	Miller; Yves Tumor; Jacob Reske	Reske; Tumor	3:03
17.	"Like You Do"	Miller; Chelsea Lena; Kacy Anne Hill; Kurtis McKenzie; Linden Jay; Joshua Bliss Taffel	McKenzie; Jay; Taffel	4:00
18.	"Your Man"	Miller; Alexander Kotz; James Stack	Jim-E Stack	2:44
Total length:				53:15

Notes

- ^{^[a]} indicates an additional producer.
- "Modus" and "Nitrous" are stylized in all caps.

== Personnel ==
Musicians

- George Miller – vocals
- Greg Kurstin – bass, Mellotron, piano (4)
- Randy Pereira – solo guitar (7)
- Omar Apollo – vocals (9)
- Lil Yachty – vocals (11)
- Miles Benjamin Robinson – guitar (11)
- Rei Brown – vocals (12)
- Benee – vocals (13)
- Yves Tumor – vocals (16)

Technical

- Chris Athens – mastering
- Rob Kinelski – mixing (1, 2, 4, 6–9, 11, 13, 17)
- Tristan Hoogland – mixing (3, 5, 10, 12, 15, 16, 18)
- Jeff Ellis – mixing (14)
- George Miller – recording (1–3, 5, 9–13, 15-17)
- Francisco Ramirez – recording (1, 2, 6–10, 13-15, 17, 18), mixing (6)
- Matt Anthony - recording (1, 6)
- Maximilian Jaeger – recording (4)
- Omar Apollo – recording (9)
- Lil Yachty – recording (11)
- Rei Brown – recording (12)
- Benee – recording (13)
- Josh Fountain – recording (13)
- Yves Tumor – recording (16)
- Julian Burg – engineering (4)
- Greg Kurstin – engineering (4)
- Casey Cuayo – mixing assistance (1, 2, 4, 6–9, 11, 13, 17)
- Eli Heisler – mixing assistance (1, 2, 9, 11, 13, 17)
- Nathan Phillips – mixing assistance (14)
- Alex Robles – engineering assistance (17)

== Charts ==
=== Weekly charts ===
Weekly chart performance for Nectar
Chart (2020–2021)	Peak position
Australian Albums (ARIA)	1
Austrian Albums (Ö3 Austria)	20
Belgian Albums (Ultratop Flanders)	22
Belgian Albums (Ultratop Wallonia)	68
Canadian Albums (Billboard)	4
Danish Albums (Hitlisten)	15
Dutch Albums (Album Top 100)	21
Finnish Albums (Suomen virallinen lista)	27
French Albums (SNEP)	49
German Albums (Offizielle Top 100)	48
Irish Albums (Official Charts)	11
Italian Albums (FIMI)	97
New Zealand Albums (RMNZ)	2
Norwegian Albums (VG-lista)	9
Scottish Albums (Official Charts)	11
Spanish Albums (Promusicae)	25
Swedish Albums (Sverigetopplistan)	17
Swiss Albums (Schweizer Hitparade)	42
UK Albums (Official Charts)	6
US Billboard 200	3

=== Year-end charts ===
2020 year-end chart performance for Nectar
Chart (2020)	Position
Australian Artist Albums (ARIA)	43

2021 year-end chart performance for Nectar
Chart (2021)	Position
Australian Artist Albums (ARIA)	25

== Certifications ==
Certifications for Nectar
Region	Certification	Certified units/sales
Canada (Music Canada)	Gold	40,000^{‡}
New Zealand (RMNZ)	Platinum	15,000^{‡}
United Kingdom (BPI)	Gold	100,000^{‡}
United States (RIAA)	Gold	500,000^{‡}
^{‡} Sales+streaming figures based on certification alone.
