= Slow Dancing in the Dark =

Single by Joji

from the album Ballads 1
- Released: 12 September 2018
- Genre: R&B
- Length: 3:29
- Label: 88rising; 12Tone
- Songwriters: George Miller; Patrick Wimberly
- Producers: George Miller; Patrick Wimberly

Joji singles chronology
"Yeah Right" (2018)	"Slow Dancing in the Dark" (2018)	"Can't Get Over You" (2018)

Audio sample
- file; help

Music video
- "Slow Dancing in the Dark" on YouTube

"Slow Dancing in the Dark" (stylized in all caps) is a song by Japanese-Australian singer-songwriter Joji from his debut album, Ballads 1 (2018). The song was released on 12 September 2018, as the album's second single, and was written and produced by Joji and Patrick Wimberly.

== Background and promotion ==
Joji showcased the track for the first time during a live performance in May 2018, which caused the creation of bootleg versions, reworks, and covers to be released before the song's official release. It was then officially released as the second single from his debut studio album, Ballads 1, on 12 September 2018, alongside the album's release date.

== Music video ==
A music video for the song was released on the same day as its release, on 12 September 2018, and was directed by Jared Hogan.

=== Synopsis ===
The video features Miller in a white tuxedo smoking a cigarette and stumbling through city streets at night in emotional anguish. Later in the video, he is revealed to be a satyr with an arrow in his back. He coughs up blood while splayed on an illuminated dance floor. He eventually collapses in a pool of blood. The final frame is used in the song's cover artwork. The video's visual style has been compared to that of director David Fincher.

== Remixes ==
An acoustic remix of "Slow Dancing in the Dark" was released as a single on 18 October 2018. It features Miller singing over a solo piano backing played by co-producer Carol Kuswanto.

Remixes of the song by Mr. Mitch and Loud Luxury were released on 9 November 2018.

== Usage in media ==
A microwave-like 'ding' sound effect present in the song's pre-chorus spawned an internet challenge on short-form video service TikTok in 2019 known as the "Microwave Challenge". In the challenge, people were asked to spin themselves around while sitting on the floor, imitating food spinning in a microwave.

== Personnel ==
Original version

Credits adapted from Tidal.

- George Miller – songwriting, vocals, arrangement
- Patrick Wimberly – production, recording, mixing, arrangement
- Francisco "Frankie" Ramirez – recording
- Chris Athens – mastering

Acoustic Remix

Credits adapted from Tidal.

- George Miller – production, songwriting, arrangement
- Patrick Wimberly – production, arrangement
- Carol Kuswanto – production
- Francisco "Frankie" Ramirez – mastering, mixing, recording

== Charts ==
=== Weekly charts ===
2018–2019 weekly chart performance for "Slow Dancing in the Dark"
Chart (2018–2019)	Peak position
Canada (Canadian Hot 100)	52
New Zealand Hot Singles (RMNZ)	4
US Billboard Hot 100	69
US Hot R&B/Hip-Hop Songs (Billboard)	39

2022 weekly chart performance for "Slow Dancing in the Dark"
Chart (2022)	Peak position
Australia (ARIA)	91
Global 200 (Billboard)	149
Malaysia (RIM)	10
Singapore (RIAS)	27
Vietnam (Vietnam Hot 100)	77

=== Year-end charts ===
Year-end chart performance for "Slow Dancing in the Dark"
Chart (2019)	Position
US Hot R&B Songs (Billboard)	5

== Certifications ==
Certifications for "Slow Dancing in the Dark"
Region	Certification	Certified units/sales
Australia (ARIA)	Platinum	70,000^{‡}
Denmark (IFPI Danmark)	Gold	45,000^{‡}
France (SNEP)	Gold	100,000^{‡}
New Zealand (RMNZ)	3× Platinum	90,000^{‡}
Poland (ZPAV)	Gold	25,000^{‡}
Portugal (AFP)	Platinum	10,000^{‡}
Spain (Promusicae)	Gold	30,000^{‡}
United Kingdom (BPI)	Platinum	600,000^{‡}
United States (RIAA)	5× Platinum	5,000,000^{‡}
^{‡} Sales+streaming figures based on certification alone.
