= Ballads 1 =

2018 album by Joji

Studio album by Joji
- Released: 26 October 2018
- Genres: R&B; lo-fi; downtempo; trap; pop
- Length: 35:10
- Labels: 88rising; 12Tone
- Producers: Rogét Chahayed; Clams Casino; D33J; John Durham; Ryan Hemsworth; Jam City; Joji; RL Grime; Shlohmo; Thundercat; Patrick Wimberly

Joji chronology
In Tongues (2017)	Ballads 1 (2018)	Nectar (2020)

Singles from Ballads 1
- 1. "Yeah Right" Released: 8 May 2018; 2. "Slow Dancing in the Dark" Released: 12 September 2018; 3. "Can't Get Over You" Released: 2 October 2018; 4. "Test Drive" Released: 16 October 2018

Ballads 1 is the debut studio album by Japanese-Australian singer-songwriter Joji. The album was released on 26 October 2018 through 88rising and 12Tone Music. The album debuted at number three on the US Billboard 200 as well as number one on the US Top R&B/Hip-Hop Albums chart. The album was certified platinum by the RIAA in October 2021.

== Composition and writing ==
Ballads 1 is primarily produced by Joji himself and contains only one guest vocal feature, with Trippie Redd appearing on "R.I.P." though features production features from names such as Clams Casino, D33J and Shlohmo. The project is introspective, writing about the "reality of love, life and everything in between." The project ranges from songs that are "heart-wrenching" and sometimes more cheerful to capture the feeling that "no one's sad all the time".

The focus of the project is ballads, according to Joji; and in an interview with Annie Mac said that he was trying to make the project full of ballads that are different in their "own special way" and that are powerful, set a new direction but keep "Joji roots" he established on In Tongues.

Joji stated in an interview with Triple J how he wanted to take a more pop-oriented approach to his style on the album, which began with the single "Yeah Right".

== Promotion ==
=== Singles ===
The lead single, "Yeah Right", was released on 8 May 2018. It was released with a music video and was produced by Joji.

Alongside the announcement for Ballads 1, "Slow Dancing in the Dark" was released on 12 September 2018 as the album's second single. An accompanying music video directed by Jared Hogan was released the same day.

"Can't Get Over You" was released on 2 October 2018 with an accompanying video directed by Miller and SAINT. The album's release date, cover artwork and track listing were revealed the same day.

"Test Drive" was released on 16 October 2018 with an accompanying video directed by James Defina.

=== Other songs ===
A music video for "Wanted U" was released on 29 October 2018, directed by Michael La Burt.

== Commercial performance ==
Ballads 1 debuted at number 3 on the Billboard 200, with 57,000 album-equivalent units. The album has since been certified gold as of 16 January 2020.

== Critical reception ==
Professional ratings
Review scores
Source	Rating
Highsnobiety	3/5
Pitchfork	6.7/10
Rolling Stone	3/5 stars

Braudie Blais-Billie from Pitchfork stated "Joji's first full-length project features a host of guests in a quality effort to help push past the confines of his bedroom walls and tedious heartache", going on to write "The ballad is a great mode for Joji. It retains the tormented intimacy of his music while elevating his approach to a more radio-friendly consistency than the runny compositions of In Tongues", giving the album a 6.7/10. Elias Leight from Rolling Stone gave the project 3 out of 5 stars, complimenting the progression from the In Tongues EP, the change of musical style throughout the project and the ability to produce "a particular kind of self-deprecating pop."

Rap and R&B blogs, the two genres which are the primary demographic of Miller, gave the project positive reviews. Highsnobiety gave the project 3/5 stars, calling it a "near-classic" with "on-point production" and complimenting Miller's progression. HotNewHipHop gave the project a "Very Hot" rating, calling the project "smooth." RIFF magazine complimented Miller's attempt to expand on his potential and spoke on its "array of soundscapes."

== Track listing ==
All tracks are written by George Miller, except where noted.

No.	Title	Writer(s)	Producer(s)	Length
1.	"Attention"		Joji	2:09
2.	"Slow Dancing in the Dark"		Joji; Patrick Wimberly	3:29
3.	"Test Drive"		RL Grime	2:59
4.	"Wanted U"		Joji	4:11
5.	"Can't Get Over You" (featuring Clams Casino)		Thundercat; Clams Casino; Rogét Chahayed	1:47
6.	"Yeah Right"		Joji	2:54
7.	"Why Am I Still in LA" (featuring Shlohmo and D33J)		Shlohmo; D33J	3:20
8.	"No Fun"		Jam City	2:48
9.	"Come Thru"		Shlohmo	2:33
10.	"R.I.P." (featuring Trippie Redd)	Miller; Michael White II	Joji; Ryan Hemsworth	2:39
11.	"XNXX"	Miller; John Durham	Joji; Durham	2:07
12.	"I'll See You in 40"		Joji	4:14
Total length:				35:10

== Personnel ==
Credits adapted from Tidal.

Technical

- Henry Laufer – mixing (7), recording (7, 9)
- Francisco "Frankie" Ramirez – mixing (1, 3–6, 8–12), recording (1-4, 8–10), engineering (2), mastering (6, 11)
- Alison McGuire – mixing (12), recording (12)
- Patrick Wimberly - mixing (2)
- George Miller – recording (4-6), mixing (6)
- John Durham – recording (10, 11)
- Igor Mamet – recording (10)
- Jack Latham - recording (8)
- Chris Athens – mastering (1–5, 7–10, 12)
- Jenna Felsenthal – assistant (1, 3–5, 8–12)
- Emmanuel "Yizzo" Lemmon – assistant (8, 10, 11)

Musicians

- George Miller – vocals, composer
- Patrick Wimberly – additional vocals (2)

== Charts ==
=== Weekly charts ===
Weekly chart performance for Ballads 1
Chart (2018–2023)	Peak position
Australian Albums (ARIA)	17
Belgian Albums (Ultratop Flanders)	81
Canadian Albums (Billboard)	7
Dutch Albums (Album Top 100)	44
Hungarian Physical Albums (MAHASZ)	18
Irish Albums (IRMA)	37
Lithuanian Albums (AGATA)	1
New Zealand Albums (RMNZ)	10
Norwegian Albums (VG-lista)	4
Swedish Albums (Sverigetopplistan)	47
UK Albums (Official Charts)	26
UK R&B Albums (Official Charts)	8
US Billboard 200	3
US Top R&B/Hip-Hop Albums (Billboard)	1

=== Year-end charts ===
2019 year-end chart performance for Ballads 1
Chart (2019)	Position
Icelandic Albums (Plötutíóindi)	84
US Billboard 200	126

2022 year-end chart performance for Ballads 1
Chart (2022)	Position
Lithuanian Albums (AGATA)	56

== Certifications ==
Certifications for Ballads 1
Region	Certification	Certified units/sales
Canada (Music Canada)	Platinum	80,000^{‡}
Denmark (IFPI Danmark)	Gold	10,000^{‡}
New Zealand (RMNZ)	Platinum	15,000^{‡}
Singapore (RIAS)	Gold	5,000^{*}
United Kingdom (BPI)	Gold	100,000^{‡}
United States (RIAA)	Platinum	1,000,000^{‡}
^{*} Sales figures based on certification alone.^{‡} Sales+streaming figures based on certification alone.
