= Sanctuary (Joji song) =

Single by Joji

from the album Nectar
- Released: 14 June 2019
- Genre: Soul; lo-fi; R&B; electropop
- Length: 3:00
- Label: 88rising; 12 Tone Music
- Songwriters: George Miller; Daniel Wilson; Justin Raisen; Luke Niccoli
- Producer: Justin Raisen

Joji singles chronology
"Test Drive" (2018)	"Sanctuary" (2019)	"Breathe" (2019)

Music video
- "Sanctuary" on YouTube

"Sanctuary" is a song by Japanese-Australian singer-songwriter Joji. It was released on 14 June 2019 through 88rising Records and 12 Tone Music. The track was written by Joji, Daniel Wilson, Justin Raisen and Luke Niccoli, with Raisen handling production. Eoin Glaister directed the song's accompanying music video.

== Composition ==
"Sanctuary" was composed by Joji, Daniel Wilson, Justin Raisen and Luke Niccoli, arranged by Joji and produced by Raisen. It is an electro-R&B ballad that incorporates elements of trap, electronica and soul music, and its production features ambient synthesizers and a minimalist beat. Like most of Joji's tracks, "Sanctuary" is a love song, though its lyrics feature "more poetically abstract verses", rather than the artist's usual "frank and uncomplicated confessions." Throughout the song, Joji sings to a potential lover that he can offer devotion and honesty, though asks them to express their love for him rather than waiting for reciprocation.

== Reception ==
Salvatore Maiki of The Fader described the track as "catchy", while Mike Wass of Idolator wrote that its blend of genres was a "heady mix". Gabriel Aikins of Substream Magazine named it one of the best songs of the week, claiming that "when it comes to introspective, atmospheric tracks, there are few doing it better right now than Joji," and commended the artist's vocal performance and Raisen's production.

== Music video ==
A music video for "Sanctuary" was shared upon the track's release on 14 June 2019 and was directed by Eoin Glaister in Lancaster, California. Joji visualized the video's concept as he was writing the song, stating in an interview with Harper's Bazaar that "as soon as [he] heard the instrumental for [the song] [he] knew it had to be something like cheesy space shit." It features Joji as the captain of a spaceship who struggles to find purpose after he has defeated his main enemy. A close friend, noticing this and resolving to bring his purpose back, gouges out one of his eyes with a spoon in order to resemble this villain, steals a MacGuffin that they had retrieved from the villain some time prior to his death, then kills a crewmate, leaves using an escape pod, and attacks the ship, forcing Joji to assume his position as captain and defend the spacecraft, thus bringing excitement back into his life.

== Charts ==
Chart performance for "Sanctuary"
Chart (2019–2024)	Peak position
Australia (ARIA)	42
Canada (Canadian Hot 100)	58
Ireland (IRMA)	61
Lithuania (AGATA)	14
Malaysia (RIM)	7
New Zealand (Recorded Music NZ)	32
Philippines Hot 100 (Billboard)	59
Singapore Top Regional (RIAS)	15
UK Singles (OCC)	63
US Billboard Hot 100	80
US Hot R&B/Hip-Hop Songs (Billboard)	32

== Certifications ==
Certifications for "Sanctuary"
Region	Certification	Certified units/sales
Australia (ARIA)	Gold	35,000^{‡}
New Zealand (RMNZ)	Platinum	30,000^{‡}
United Kingdom (BPI)	Silver	200,000^{‡}
United States (RIAA)	Gold	500,000^{‡}
^{‡} Sales+streaming figures based on certification alone.
