= Joji (musician) =

Japanese-Australian musician and comedian (born 1993)

- ジョージ
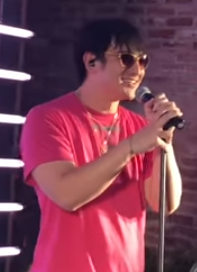
- Joji performing in 2018
- Born: George Kusunoki Miller; 16 September 1993 (age 33); Osaka, Japan
- Education: Canadian Academy; New York Tech (BFA)
- Occupations: Singer; songwriter; rapper; record producer; comedian
- Years active: 2007–present
- Musical career
- Origin: Higashinada-ku, Kobe, Japan
- Genres: Joji; R&B; alt-R&B; trip hop; lo-fi Filthy Frank / Pink Guy; Surreal humour; satirical music; satire; comedy hip-hop; shock humour; black comedy
- Instruments: Vocals; ukulele; keyboards; sampler
- Labels: 88rising; 12Tone; Warner; Palace Creek; Virgin

YouTube information
- Channels: TVFilthyFrank; DizastaMusic
- Years active: 2006–2017
- Genres: Shock comedy; surreal humour
- Subscribers: 8.79 million
- Views: 1.4 billion
- Last updated: July 1, 2026
- Website: jojimusic.com

George Kusunoki Miller (ジョージ・楠木・ミラー, Jōji Kusunoki Mirā), known professionally as Joji (born September 16, 1993), is a Japanese-Australian singer, songwriter, rapper, comedian, and former internet personality. His music has been described as a mix between R&B, lo-fi, and trip-hop. Miller also created The Filthy Frank Show on YouTube in 2011, a comedy web-series while he was still living in Japan, playing the oddball characters Filthy Frank and Pink Guy.

Miller uploaded videos on the channels "TVFilthyFrank", "TooDamnFilthy", and "DizastaMusic". He began producing Filthy Frank videos in August 2011, during his college enrollment in the United States. The channels, which featured comedy hip-hop, rants, extreme challenges, and ukulele and dance performances, were noted for their shock humor and prolific virality. Miller popularised the Harlem Shake, an Internet meme that contributed to the commercial success of Baauer's song "Harlem Shake" and led him to further prominence on YouTube. As Pink Guy, he released two comedy studio albums, Pink Guy and Pink Season, as well as an extended play, between 2014 and 2017.

In late 2017, Miller ended The Filthy Frank Show to pursue a music career under the name "Joji", the Japanese version of his first name. He signed with 88Rising and 12Tone Music Group to release his first two studio albums, Ballads 1 (2018) and Nectar (2020), both of which peaked at number three on the Billboard 200 and spawned the singles "Slow Dancing in the Dark" and "Sanctuary". Both songs entered the Billboard Hot 100 and ARIA Charts, while his 2022 single, "Glimpse of Us", peaked at number eight on the former and atop the latter, became his highest-charting song, and preceded his third album Smithereens (2022). His fourth album, Piss in the Wind, was released on 6 February 2026.

== Early life ==
George Kusunoki Miller was born in Osaka, Japan to an Australian father and a Japanese mother. He attended Canadian Academy, an international school in Kobe, in Hyōgo, Japan, where he graduated in 2012. At age 18, Miller left Japan and travelled to the United States, where he subsequently enrolled into the New York Institute of Technology and received a Bachelor of Fine Arts (BFA) degree in 2016.

== YouTube career ==
On 23 September 2006, Miller created his first YouTube channel, "2cool4u92". The channel's only video, which shared a name with the channel, was uploaded on 17 October 2006. In the video, which was presumably recorded by a schoolmate of his, a 13-year-old Miller breakdances in what is seemingly a school hallway. This is the earliest known video of Miller on YouTube. On 16 June 2008, Miller created the DizastaMusic channel, on which he generally uploaded sketch comedy-based videos. The earliest known video on the channel was uploaded on 19 June 2008, titled "Lil Jon falls off a table".

=== Filthy Frank (2011–2017) ===
The channel began gaining popularity after his conceptualization of Filthy Frank in 2011, a character Miller described as the anti-vlogger of YouTube. His first video under the persona "Filthy Frank" was him describing diarrhea that he had experienced a day prior. The DizastaMusic channel has over 1 million subscribers and 177 million views as of November 2026. On 15 August 2014, Miller uploaded a video to the DizastaMusic channel announcing that he would not be posting any more content onto the channel due to its risk of being lost because of the numerous copyright and community strikes it had received. He also announced that future "Filthy Frank" content would be uploaded to a new channel he had created called TVFilthyFrank.

Miller's channel, TVFilthyFrank, had many different series, such as "Food" (和食ラップ, where he created unconventional food recipes), "Japanese 101" (where he taught crass and crude Japanese words), "Wild Games" (where he made comedic games, such as one where the first crab to bite his leg wins), and "Loser Reads Hater Comments" (where he read online hate comments). This channel had a total of 7.88 million subscribers and over one billion views as of October 2023, and had multiple collaborations with creators such as Keemstar, iDubbbz, Ray William Johnson, Maxmoefoe, and Anything4views. Miller created a third channel, TooDamnFilthy, on 1 July 2014. On this channel, he had two series, "Japanese 101", which was also featured on his main channel, and "Cringe of the Week", which typically was abbreviated to "COTW". As of October 2021, TooDamnFilthy has 2.33 million subscribers and 332 million views.

On 27 September 2017, Miller announced the release of his first book, titled Francis of the Filth, which addresses things uncovered in The Filthy Frank Show and serves as a culmination of the series.

On 29 December 2017, Miller announced in a Twitter post that he would be retiring his Filthy Frank and Pink Guy personas to focus on his music career, citing a loss of interest in his old content, a desire for personal growth, and health concerns that included throat damage and neurological issues. In September 2018, Miller stated in a BBC Radio 1 interview that he had no choice but to stop producing comedy due to his health condition.

== Music career ==
=== Pink Guy (2012–2017) ===
Miller always had a passion for music composition. He has expressed that even before his YouTube career, he had an interest in creating music and created his YouTube channel as a means of promoting it. In an interview with Pigeons and Planes, he said, "I've always wanted to make normal music. I just started the YouTube channel to kind of bump my music. But then Filthy Frank and the Pink Guy stuff ended up getting way bigger than I thought so I had to kind of roll with it."

Miller's music under Pink Guy is often comical, staying true to the nature of his YouTube channel. His second album, Pink Season, debuted at number 70 on the Billboard 200. Under his comedy rap stage name, Pink Guy, Miller has produced two albums, and one extended play, Pink Guy, Pink Season, and Pink Season: The Prophecy, respectively. On 16 March 2017, Miller performed for the first time as Pink Guy at SXSW.

Future plans were stated to include a "long overdue" tour, another Pink Guy album and more progress on his personal music outside of the Pink Guy character. As of 29 December 2017, Joji has ceased production of all Filthy Frank-related content, including Pink Guy music.

=== Joji (2015–present) ===
Aside from the comedic music he created under the Pink Guy alias, Miller also created more serious and traditional music under another stage name, Joji, which became his primary focus in late 2017. Speaking about his transition from his YouTube career to his music career as Joji, Miller said to Billboard, "Now I get to do stuff that I want to hear." In the article by Billboard, he specified that "Joji" isn't a character like Filthy Frank and Pink Guy. "I guess that's the difference," he continues. "Joji's just me."

During his time growing up in Higashinada-ku, Kobe, Japan, Miller began to produce music and sing with friends as a side hobby and a way to pass the time. After relocating to New York City, United States, Miller expanded upon his music career by starting his Pink Guy persona, which paved the way for his Joji persona. Miller originally announced his Joji album on 3 May 2014 alongside the first Pink Guy album. However, Miller subtly cancelled the project until he began releasing music under the name PinkOmega. Miller released two songs as PinkOmega: "Dumplings" on 4 June 2015 and "wefllagn.ii 5" on 28 August 2015, both of which were later released on the Pink Guy album Pink Season, the latter being re-titled "We Fall Again".

Miller intended to keep the music made under Joji a secret from his fanbase, as it mainly wanted his comedic music. In late 2015, two singles were released, titled "Thom" and "You Suck Charlie"; both were released under a false alias, but it was quickly leaked that the user behind the account was Miller, which prompted him in January 2016 to publicly announce on Instagram that he was releasing a full-length commercial project titled Chloe Burbank: Volume 1. In the same post, he linked his SoundCloud account.

Miller began releasing music under 88rising in 2017; the songs "I Don't Wanna Waste My Time" (on 26 April), "Rain on Me" (on 19 July), and "Will He" (on 17 October). Miller was featured in the song "Nomadic" with the Chinese rap group Higher Brothers. Miller performed live as Joji for the first time on 18 May 2017 in Los Angeles. The event was streamed by the Boiler Room. On 17 October 2017, Miller released "Will He", the lead single from his debut project under the moniker Joji, In Tongues. In Tongues was released on 3 November 2017. A deluxe version of the EP was released on 14 February 2018 with 8 remixes of songs from the EP, along with the release of "Plastic Taste" and "I Don't Wanna Waste My Time" as part of the track listing.

Miller released the song "Yeah Right" in May 2018, becoming his first to chart on a Billboard chart, peaking at 23 on the Billboard R&B Songs chart. Miller debuted Ballads 1 under the label 88rising on 26 October 2018, which quickly peaked on the Billboard Top R&B/Hip Hop Albums Chart. Shortly after its release, Miller announced a North American tour spanning 9 dates in early 2019. At that time, he was already on tour for Ballads 1 in Europe. On 14 June 2019, Miller released his single "Sanctuary" alongside a music video.

Miller was featured in the song "Where Does the Time Go?" with Indonesian rapper Rich Brian on his second album, The Sailor. On 30 January 2020, Miller announced another single, "Run", which was released at midnight on 6 February, alongside a music video released later that day. On 2 March, he performed the song on The Tonight Show Starring Jimmy Fallon. On 16 April, Joji announced the single "Gimme Love", which was released at midnight, and along with announced his upcoming album Nectar, which was initially set to be released on 10 July 2020. However, on 12 June 2020, Miller announced that the album had been pushed back to 25 September 2020 due to the COVID-19 pandemic.

On 10 June 2022, Miller released the single "Glimpse of Us", which peaked at number 8 on the Billboard Hot 100. On 26 August, he released a second single called "Yukon (Interlude)". On 4 November, Miller released his album Smithereens, alongside the single "Die for You". Miller embarked on the Pandemonium World Tour in 2023 in support of the album, which was cut short for health reasons.

On 14 October 2025, after a three-year hiatus, Miller released the single "Pixelated Kisses", his first single under his own label Palace Creek, which is distributed by Virgin Music. On 4 November, Miller released a second single titled "If It Only Gets Better", and announced his album Piss in the Wind which released on 6 February 2026. Three days later, Miller released "Past Won't Leave My Bed", alongside a music video. On 2 January 2026, he released "Love You Less", the album's fourth single, alongside a 360-degree visualizer. The album's fifth single, "Last of a Dying Breed", was released on 23 January, alongside a visualizer. On 26 February 2026, Joji announced his international Solaris Tour, which began on 16 June 2026 at the Prudential Center in Newark, New Jersey and it features 41 shows across North America, Europe, Asia, and Oceania.

== Artistry ==
Miller's music has been described as trip hop and lo-fi that blends elements of trap, folk, electronic, and R&B. His songs have been characterised as having "down tempo, melancholic themes and soulful vocals" with "minimalistic production". Miller himself classifies his work as dark love songs, with his 2020 album, Nectar, dissecting cliché tropes and topics.

He has been compared to electronic artist James Blake, whom he has cited as an influence alongside Radiohead, Shlohmo and Donald Glover. In an interview with Pigeons and Planes, Miller said that his music was inspired by his time growing up in Osaka and by boom bap instrumentals he listened to while attending Canadian Academy.

== Influence ==
Miller's web-show had a significant effect on 2010's meme culture, reshaping internet shock humour and being responsible for the creation of many viral internet memes, such as "It’s Time to Stop", and most famously, the Harlem Shake craze in 2013, which helped debut Baauer’s eponymous song atop the Billboard Top 100.

== Personal life ==
In 2014, Miller revealed that he has an undisclosed neurological disorder which causes him to have stress-induced seizures. He has also been forced to cancel a number of live performances due to this and other undisclosed health issues.

== Discography ==
=== Studio albums ===
As Joji

- Ballads 1 (2018)
- Nectar (2020)
- Smithereens (2022)
- Piss in the Wind (2026)

As Pink Guy

- Pink Season (2017)

=== Extended plays ===
As Joji

- In Tongues (EP) (2017)

=== Unreleased albums ===
As Joji

- Chloe Burbank: Volume 1

== Tours ==
- Ballads 1 Tour (2018–2019)
- Nectar: The Finale (2021–2022)
- Smithereens Tour (2022–2023)
- Pandemonium (2023)
- Solaris Tour (2026)

== Awards and nominations ==
List of Joji's awards and nominations
Award ceremony	Year	Nominee(s) / Work(s)	Category	Result	Ref.
ARIA Music Awards	2022	"Glimpse of Us"	Song of the Year	Nominated	
ARIA Music Awards	2023	Die for You	Song of the Year	Nominated	
Berlin Music Video Awards	2026	"Last of a Dying Breed / Dior"	Best Director	Nominated	
iHeartRadio Music Awards	2019	Joji	Social Star Award	Nominated	
iHeartRadio Music Awards	2023	"Glimpse of Us"	Best Lyrics	Nominated	
Music Video Festival Awards	2020	"777"	Innovation in a Music	Won	
Music Video Festival Awards	2020	"777"	Best Animation in a Music Video	Won	
Nickelodeon Kids' Choice Awards	2023	Joji	Favorite Breakout Artist	Nominated	
UK Music Video Awards	2022	"Glimpse of Us"	Best Alternative Video – International	Nominated	
UK Music Video Awards	2022	"Glimpse of Us"	Best Editing in a Video	Won	

== See also ==
- List of YouTubers
