= Virgin Music Group =

Umbrella label group owned by Universal Music Group

- Industry: Music
- Genre: Various
- Predecessors: Ingrooves; Virgin Music; PIAS Group; SONO Music Group; Downtown Music Holdings
- Founded: September 13, 2022; 4 years ago
- Headquarters: Los Angeles, California, United States
- Area served: Worldwide
- Key people: JT Myers (CEO); Nat Pastor (CEO)
- Services: Distributor
- Owner: Universal Music Group
- Divisions: PIAS Group; [Integral] Distribution; Downtown Music Services; CD Baby; FUGA; Songtrust; AdRev; Soundrop; mTheory
- Subsidiaries: Virgin Records; Caroline Records; Fiction Records
- Website: virginmusic.com

Virgin Music Group (VMG) is an American multinational music marketing service and distribution company founded in 2022 from the merger of Virgin Music Label & Artist Services and Ingrooves. A division of Universal Music Group, it specializes in the distribution of independent record labels and independent artists.

== History ==
On February 18, 2021, Universal Music Group (UMG) announced Virgin Music Label & Artist Services, a new global network to deliver premium and flexible artist and label services. Seven months after its announcement, UMG launched Virgin Music Group, an entertainment and music company that would head operations of Virgin Music Label & Artist Services and Ingrooves. Prior to its launch, UMG appointed Mtheory founders JT Myers and Nat Pastor to serve as co-chief executive officers of Virgin Music Group.

== Partnership ==
On February 21, 2023, Virgin Music Group confirmed a partnership between its subsidiary Virgin Music Label & Artist Services, the UK division of Virgin Music, and Modern Sky UK, a British record label. In an interview with Complete Music Update, David Pichilingi, CEO of Modern Sky UK and North America, said, "We're delighted to sign this deal with Virgin Music UK, providing a global team who closely align with our values and ambition [...] This deal will allow us to work more effectively globally, and we are excited at the prospect of sending Modern Sky to new heights in 2023 alongside our friends and partners at Virgin Music."

== Labels ==
=== Owned and operated by Virgin Music Group ===
- mTheory
- IMPERIAL Music
- [Integral] Distribution Services
- SoNo Recording Group
- Suburban Noize Records
- Virgin Music Africa (joint venture with Universal Music Africa (50%))
- Virgin Music Argentina (joint venture with Universal Music Argentina (50%))
- Virgin Music Australia (joint venture with Universal Music Australia (25%) and Universal Music New Zealand (25%))
- Virgin Music Benelux (joint venture with Universal Music Belgium (25%) and Universal Music Netherlands (25%))
- Virgin Music Brasil (joint venture with Universal Music Brazil (50%))
- Virgin Music Chile (joint venture with Universal Music Chile (50%))
- Virgin Music France (joint venture with Universal Music France (50%))
- Virgin Music Germany (joint venture with Universal Music Germany (50%))
- Virgin Music Italy (joint venture with Universal Music Italy (50%))
- Virgin Music Japan (joint venture with Universal Music Japan (50%))
- Virgin Music Latin US (joint venture with Universal Music Latin Entertainment (50%))
- Virgin Music Mexico (joint venture with Universal Music Mexico (50%))
- Virgin Music Nigeria (joint venture with Universal Music Nigeria (50%))
- Virgin Music Nordics (joint venture with Universal Music Denmark (25%) and Universal Music Finland (25%))
- Virgin Music Norway (joint venture with Universal Music Norway (50%))
- Virgin Music Portugal (joint venture with Universal Music Portugal (50%))
- Virgin Music Spain (joint venture with Universal Music Spain (50%))
- Virgin Music Sweden (joint venture with Universal Music Sweden (50%))
- Virgin Music UK (joint venture with Universal Music UK (50%))
- Virgin Music US (joint venture with other UMG labels (50%))
- Virgin Music Vietnam (joint venture with Universal Music Vietnam (50%))
- Virgin Nashville (joint venture with Music Corporation of America (50%))

=== Distributed labels ===
- Big Loud
- Butterfly Records
- FUSE FOUR
- Hoo-Bangin' Records
- Hundred Days Records
- Kottonmouth ReKordz
- Love Tap Records
- Netflix Music
- Primary Wave Music
- Rain Labs
- SoNo Recording Group
- Strange Music
- Suburban Noize Records
- Suede Records

== Artists ==
- Agung Gede
- Baby Lasagna
- Benzio Music
- Brandon Nicholas Santana
- CG5
- Beji
- David Morris
- Dontmesswithjuan
- Half Alive
- Jelena Karleuša
- Joji
- Kate Hudson
- KENNYJACTA
- Kevin Abstract
- Kings of Leon
- Kip Moore
- Kottonmouth Kings
- Lauv
- Leigh-Anne
- LL Cool J
- Meek Mill
- Melanie C
- Nettspend
- NEZZA
- NF
- Nicky Jam
- NWM
- Pendulum
- Rema
- Steven Wilson
- The Paradox
- Vance Westlake
- X Ambassadors
