= Ski Mask the Slump God discography =

Punk rap recording artist discography

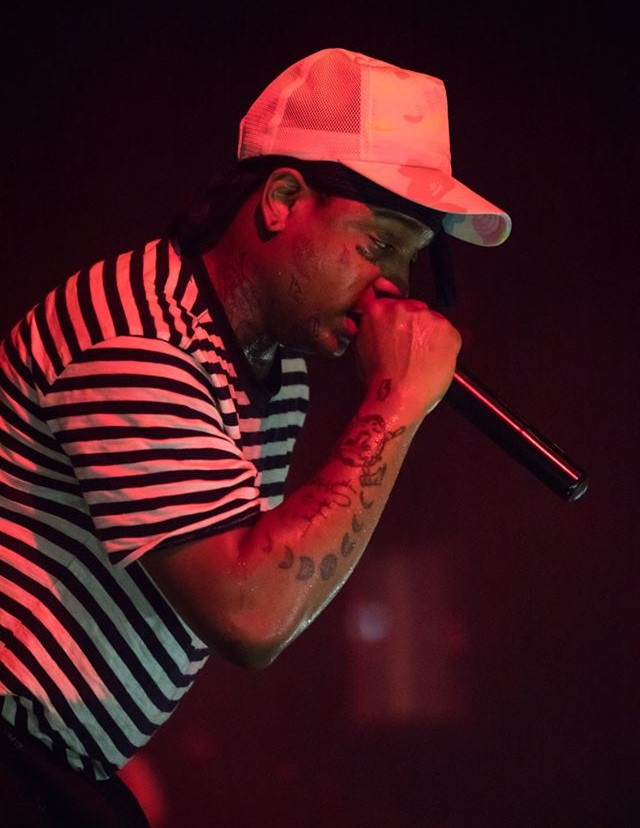
- Ski Mask The Slump God performing in June 2018
- Studio albums: 2
- EPs: 4
- Compilation albums: 1
- Singles: 20
- Mixtapes: 8

American rapper Ski Mask the Slump God has released two studio albums, four mixtapes, four collaborative mixtapes, four extended plays, one compilation album and 17 singles (including seven as a featured artist). Ski Mask's debut studio album, Stokeley, was released on November 30, 2018, through Republic Records and peaked on the US Billboard 200 chart at number six.

== Albums ==
=== Studio albums ===
List of studio albums, with selected details and chart positions
| Title | Album details | Peak chart positions | | | | | | | | | | Certifications |
| Title | Album details | US | US R&B/HH | US Rap | AUS | CAN | IRE | NOR | NZ | SWE | UK | Certifications |
|---|---|---|---|---|---|---|---|---|---|---|---|---|
| Stokeley | Released: November 30, 2018; Label: Victor Victor, Republic; Format: CD, LP, digital download | 6 | 4 | 4 | 35 | 11 | 38 | 13 | 24 | 24 | 64 | RIAA: Platinum; BPI: Silver |
| 11th Dimension | Released: June 7, 2024; Labels: Victor Victor, Republic; Format: Digital download, streaming | 55 | 15 | 11 | — | 100 | — | — | — | — | — | |
"—" denotes a recording that did not chart or was not released in that territory.

=== Compilation albums ===
List of compilation albums, with selected details
| Title | Album details |
|---|---|
| The Lost Files | Released: July 30, 2025; Label: Very Rare & Co, Empire; Format: CD, LP, cassette, Digital download, streaming |

=== Mixtapes ===
List of mixtapes, with selected details and chart positions
| Title | Mixtape details | Peak chart positions | | | | | | |
| Title | Mixtape details | US | US R&B/HH | US Rap | AUS | CAN | IRE | NZ |
|---|---|---|---|---|---|---|---|---|
| Drown in Designer | Released: May 16, 2016; Label: Self-released; Format: Digital download, streaming | — | — | — | — | — | — | — |
| You Will Regret | Released: June 30, 2017; Label: Victor Victor, Republic; Format: Digital download, streaming | 195 | — | — | — | — | — | — |
| Beware the Book of Eli | Released: May 11, 2018; Label: Victor Victor, Republic; Format: Digital download, streaming | 50 | 28 | 24 | — | 94 | — | — |
| Sin City The Mixtape | Released: June 25, 2021; Label: Victor Victor, Republic; Format: Digital download, streaming | 39 | 20 | 17 | 73 | 84 | 88 | 32 |
"—" denotes a recording that did not chart or was not released in that territory.

=== Collaborative mixtapes and albums ===
List of collaborative mixtapes and albums, with selected details
| Title | Album details | Peak chart positions | | | |
| Title | Album details | US | US R&B/HH | CAN | NZ |
|---|---|---|---|---|---|
| Members Only, Vol. 1 (with XXXTentacion) | Released: April 20, 2015; Label: Self-released; Format: Digital download | — | — | — | — |
| Members Only, Vol. 2 (with Members Only) | Released: October 23, 2015; Label: Self-released; Format: Digital download | — | — | — | — |
| Members Only, Vol. 3 (with Members Only) | Released: June 26, 2017; Label: Self-released; Format: Digital download | — | — | — | — |
| Members Only, Vol. 4 (with Members Only) | Released: January 23, 2019; Label: Bad Vibes Forever, Empire; Format: Digital download | 18 | 11 | 15 | 29 |
"—" denotes a recording that did not chart or was not released in that territory.

== Extended plays ==
List of extended plays, with selected details
| Title | Details |
|---|---|
| Cruel World | Released: February 24, 2015; Label: Self-released; Format: Digital download |
| Very Rare Lost Files | Released: June 16, 2016; Label: Self-released; Format: Digital download |
| Slaps for My Drop Top Minivan | Released: July 14, 2016; Label: Self-released; Format: Digital download |
| Get Dough Presents Ski Mask the Slump God | Released: May 31, 2018; Label: Get Dough; Format: Digital download |
| Bury All Defeated (with iLL Chris) | Released: June 6, 2018; Label: Self-released; Format: Digital download |
| Archives | Released: August 10, 2018; Label: Get Dough; Format: Digital download |
| Stokeley: The Party Cuts | Released: April 9, 2021; Label: Victor Victor, Republic; Format: Digital download |
| Stokeley: The Lawless Cuts | Released: April 23, 2021; Label: Victor Victor, Republic; Format: Digital download |

== Singles ==
=== As lead artist ===
List of singles as lead artist, showing year released and album name
| Title | Year | Peak chart positions | | | | Certifications | Album |
| Title | Year | US | US R&B/ HH | CAN | NZ Hot | Certifications | Album |
|---|---|---|---|---|---|---|---|
| "Life Is Short" | 2016 | — | — | — | — | | Very Rare Lost Files |
| "BabyWipe" | 2017 | — | — | — | — | RIAA: Platinum; RMNZ: Gold | You Will Regret |
| "Take a Step Back" (featuring XXXTentacion) | 2017 | — | — | — | — | RIAA: 2× Platinum; RMNZ: Platinum | Drown in Designer and You Will Regret |
| "Catch Me Outside" | 2017 | — | — | — | — | RIAA: Platinum; RMNZ: Platinum | You Will Regret |
| "Achoo" (with Keith Ape) | 2017 | — | — | — | — | | Non-album single |
| "Flo Rida" (with Higher Brothers) | 2017 | — | — | — | — | | Journey to the West |
| "DoIHaveTheSause?" | 2018 | — | — | — | — | | Beware the Book of Eli |
| "Faucet Failure" | 2019 | 87 | 35 | 55 | 12 | RIAA: 3× Platinum; BPI: Silver; RMNZ: 2× Platinum | Stokeley |
| "Carbonated Water" | 2019 | — | — | — | 21 | | Non-album singles |
| "Burn the Hoods" | 2020 | — (Note: "Burn the Hoods" did not enter the Billboard Hot 100, but peaked at number 22 on the Bubbling Under Hot 100 chart.) | — | — | 24 | | Non-album singles |
| "New Bugatti" (with Lil Gnar and Chief Keef featuring DJ Scheme) | 2021 | — | — | — | 38 | | Die Bout It |
| "Ooga Booga!" | 2022 | — (Note: "Ooga Booga!" did not enter the Billboard Hot 100, but peaked at number 19 on the Bubbling Under Hot 100 chart.) | — | — | 26 | | Non-album singles |
| "Cowbell Warriors!" (with Sxmpra) | 2023 | — | — | — | 25 | | Non-album singles |
| "Shibuya" | 2024 | — | — | — | 33 | | 11th Dimension |
| "Headrush" | 2024 | — | — | — | — | | 11th Dimension |
| "Catch Me Outside 2" | 2025 | — (Note: "Catch Me Outside 2" did not enter the Billboard Hot 100, but peaked at number 18 on the Bubbling Under Hot 100 chart.) | 26 | — | 16 | | Non-album single |
| "Broly" (with XXXTentacion) | 2025 | — | — | — | — | | The Lost Files |
| "Fatality" (with XXXTentacion) | 2025 | — | — | — | — | | The Lost Files |
| "IWatchedHimDrown" (with XXXTentacion) | 2025 | — | — | — | — | | The Lost Files |
| "BreakTheRules!" | 2026 | — | — | — | — | | Non-album single |
"—" denotes a recording that did not chart or was not released in that territory.

=== As featured artist ===
List of singles as a featured artist, showing year released and album name
| Title | Year | Peak chart positions | | | Certifications | Album |
| Title | Year | US | US R&B/ HH | CAN | Certifications | Album |
|---|---|---|---|---|---|---|
| "What in XXXTarnation" (XXXTentacion featuring Ski Mask the Slump God) | 2017 | — | — | — | | Members Only, Vol. 3 |
| "Cheat Codes" (Bass Santana featuring Luxi Savage and Ski Mask the Slump God) | 2017 | — | — | — | | Obeah Child |
| "Up Next" (16yrold featuring Desiigner and Ski Mask the Slump God) | 2017 | — | — | — | | Non-album singles |
| "Heebie Jeebies" (Splash Zanotti featuring Ski Mask the Slump God and Dirty Faced Smook) | 2017 | — | — | — | | Non-album singles |
| "Heavy" (iLL Chris featuring Ski Mask the Slump God) | 2018 | — | — | — | | Non-album singles |
| "Costa Rica" (Dreamville featuring Bas, JID, Guapdad 4000, Reese Laflare, Jace, Mez, Smokepurpp, Buddy and Ski Mask the Slump God) | 2019 | 75 | 30 | 71 | RIAA: Platinum; RMNZ: Gold | Revenge of the Dreamers III |
| "How You Feel (Freestyle)" (DJ Scheme featuring Danny Towers, Lil Yachty and Ski Mask the Slump God) | 2020 | — | — | — | RIAA: Gold | Preseason EP and Family |
| "Soda" (DJ Scheme featuring Cordae, Ski Mask the Slump God and Take a Daytrip) | 2020 | — | — | — | | Family |
"—" denotes a recording that did not chart or was not released in that territory.

== Other charted and certified songs ==
List of other charted and certified songs, with selected chart positions, showing year released and album name
| Title | Year | Peak chart positions | | | | Certifications | Album |
| Title | Year | US | US R&B/ HH | CAN | NZ Hot | Certifications | Album |
|---|---|---|---|---|---|---|---|
| "R.I.P. Roach" (XXXTentacion featuring Ski Mask The Slump God) | 2017 | — | — | — | — | RMNZ: Gold | Revenge |
| "Nuketown" (featuring Juice Wrld) | 2018 | 63 | 32 | 81 | 10 | RIAA: 2× Platinum; BPI: Silver; RMNZ: Platinum | Stokeley |
| "Foot Fungus" | 2018 | 81 | 45 | 72 | 8 | RIAA: Platinum; RMNZ: Platinum | Stokeley |
| "Unbothered" | 2018 | — | — | — | 18 | RIAA: Platinum; RMNZ: Platinum | Stokeley |
| "E-Er" (DJ Scheme featuring Ski Mask The Slump God, Danny Towers And Lil Yachty) | 2020 | — | — | — | — | RMNZ: Gold | Family |
| "Dr. Suess" | 2021 | — | — | — | 28 | | Sin City the Mixtape |
| "Admit It" | 2021 | — | — | — | 18 | | Sin City the Mixtape |
| "The Matrix" | 2021 | — | — | — | 20 | | Sin City the Mixtape |
| "Merlin's Staff" | 2021 | — | — | — | 40 | | Sin City the Mixtape |
| "Demon Time" (with Trippie Redd) | 2021 | 94 | 36 | — | — | | Trip at Knight |
| "Monsters Inc." (featuring Future) | 2024 | — | — | — | 40 | | 11th Dimension |
| "Wake Up!" (featuring Juice Wrld) | 2024 | — | — | — | 29 | | 11th Dimension |
"—" denotes a recording that did not chart or was not released in that territory.

== Guest appearances ==
| Title | Year | Other artist(s) | Album |
|---|---|---|---|
| "Call Me Crazy" | 2016 | Dantes, Smokepurpp | Divine |
| "RIP Roach" | 2017 | XXXTENTACION | Revenge |
| "Off the Wall!" | 2017 | Members Only, XXXTENTACION | XXXTENTACION Presents: Members Only, Vol. 3 |
| "H20" | 2017 | Members Only, XXXTENTACION | XXXTENTACION Presents: Members Only, Vol. 3 |
| "Static Shock" | 2017 | Members Only, XXXTENTACION | XXXTENTACION Presents: Members Only, Vol. 3 |
| "4Peat" | 2017 | Members Only, XXXTENTACION | XXXTENTACION Presents: Members Only, Vol. 3 |
| "Invisible Kilp" | 2017 | Members Only, Kid Trunks, Robb Bank$ | XXXTENTACION Presents: Members Only, Vol. 3 |
| "Bowser" | 2017 | Members Only, XXXTENTACION | XXXTENTACION Presents: Members Only, Vol. 3 |
| "Up" | 2017 | Famous Dex, Reggie Mills | Read About It |
| "Wassup Wit the Bag" | 2018 | Lar$$en, Jay Critch | Never Looking Back |
| "Flo Rida" | 2018 | Higher Brothers | Journeys to the West |
| "Rich Bitch" | 2018 | Higher Brothers | Journeys to the West |
| "Double Up" | 2018 | Kid Buu, Oohdem Beatz, Aftrparty | Blind For Love |
| "Thriller (Forever)" | 2018 | RONNY J | OMGRONNY |
| "Costa Rica" | 2018 | RONNY J | OMGRONNY |
| "On Me" | 2018 | Buck Fifty, Flyboy Tarantino | Buck Fifty |
| "WHOHASIT" | 2018 | Nessly | Wildflower |
| "Not Legal" | 2018 | Kid Trunks, Warhol.SS, A$AP ANT | Super Sayian |
| "305-954-404" | 2018 | Thouxanbanfauni | The Lost Files |
| "Chemicals" | 2018 | CHXPO, Tyla Yaweh | Saints & Sinners |
| "Throw Dat Dope" | 2018 | iLL Chris | Rise of Sensei |
| "Kill Shit" | 2018 | iLL Chris, Robb Bank$ | Rise of Sensei |
| "Had to" | 2018 | GrownBoiTrap | Money Hungry |
| "I Need More Drugs" | 2018 | Bass Santana | Obeah Child |
| "Save The Day" | 2018 | Jacquees, Coi Leray, LouGotCash | Spider-Man: Into the Spider-Verse (Soundtrack from & Inspired by the Motion Picture) |
| "He Diddy!" | 2019 | Members Only | XXXTENTACION Presents: Members Only, Vol. 4 |
| "Make Eem Run!" | 2019 | Members Only, Bass Santana, XXXTENTACION | XXXTENTACION Presents: Members Only, Vol. 4 |
| "Empty" | 2019 | Members Only, Cooliecut, Craig Xen, Kin$oul | XXXTENTACION Presents: Members Only, Vol. 4 |
| "One Punch Man" | 2019 | Higher Brothers, Denzel Curry | Five Stars |
| "Hyde: Listen" | 2019 | Staxkz Official | Jekyll and Hyde |
| "STAIN" | 2019 | Craig Xen, Smokepurpp | Broken Kids Club |
| "RVD" | 2019 | DJ Scheme, Danny Towers | Preseason EP |
| "Hey Mister" | 2019 | DJ Scheme | Preseason EP |
| "Who He" | 2019 | Danny Towers, 10k.Caash | Tarantula |
| "Anaconda" | 2019 | CHXPO, NELL | A Bloody Boy Bristmas Story |
| "Always Saucy" | 2020 | Yung Gravy, TrippyThaKid | Gasanova |
| "Thor's Hammer Worthy" | 2020 | DJ Scheme, ZillaKami | FAMILY |
| "E-ER" | 2020 | DJ Scheme, Danny Towers, Lil Yachty | FAMILY |
| "Unseen" | 2021 | HenryDaher | R.U.OK |
| "Oh My Gawd" | 2021 | Danny Wolf | Dark Nights In Paradise |
| "Demon Time" | 2021 | Trippie Redd | Trip At Knight |
| "New Bugatti" | 2022 | Lil Gnar, Chief Keef, DJ Scheme | DIE BOUT IT |
| "FUXK" | 2022 | XXXTENTACION | LOOK AT ME: THE ALBUM |
| "TOILET WATER" | 2023 | Trippie Redd | MANSION MUSIK |
| "Bullseye" | 2023 | Chris King | The Green Tape |
| "Florida Water" | 2023 | Danny Towers, DJ Scheme, Luh Tyler | Safe House |
| "Constellation" | 2023 | — | They Cloned Tyrone (Music from and Inspired by the Netflix Film) |
| "Black Forces" | 2023 | Kuttem Reese | REESE |
| "Fly Away" | 2024 | Lyrical Lemonade, Sheck Wes, JID | All Is Yellow |
| "HIT THE FLOOR" | 2024 | Denzel Curry | King Of The Mischievous South Vol. 2 |
| "Jungle" | 2025 | Yung Bans | Real Rockstar (B4RR) |
| "Jumpy" | 2025 | Rich Brian | WHERE IS MY HEAD? |
| "Beam" | 2025 | Lil Gnar | IN MY GLORY |
