= Ronny J production discography =

The following list is a discography of production by Ronny J, an American hip hop producer, rapper and singer from Miami, Florida. It includes a list of songs produced, co-produced and remixed by year, artist, album and title.

== 2013 ==
=== Metro Zu – Z Unit ===
- 06. "Dickieset"
- 08. "Bakwood"

=== Denzel Curry – Nostalgic 64 ===
- 02. "Zone 3" (produced with MarkMC9 and POSHstronaut)
- 05. "Threatz" (featuring Yung Simmie and Robb Banks)
- 06. "Mystical Virus, Pt. 3: The Scream" (featuring Lil Ugly Mane and Mike G) (produced with POSHstronaut and Bodega Creative Co.)

=== Ruben Slikk – Launderboss ===
- 17. "Beat a Bitch Gawtdemm"

=== Raider Klan – Tales From the Underground ===
- 06. "Ride Wit Me" (featuring Yung Simmie and Nell)

== 2014 ==
=== Mike Zombie ===
- "They Know" (With Kur)

=== Pouya ===
- "Copy Cat"

== 2015 ==
=== Denzel Curry – 32 Zel/Planet Shrooms ===
- 03. "Envy Me"
- 04. "Ultimate"

=== Ronny J ===
- "Vigorous" (featuring Denzel Curry and Keith Ape)

== 2016 ==
=== Denzel Curry ===
- "SpaceGhostPussy" (featuring Lofty305, Ski Mask the Slump God, and XXXTentacion)
- "Purrposely" (featuring XXXTentacion)

=== Denzel Curry – Imperial ===
- 01. "ULT" (produced with Nick Leon and FNZ)
- 02. "Gook" (produced with FNZ and Lino Martinez)
- 03. "Sick & Tired" (produced with FNZ)
- 04. "Knotty Head" (featuring Rick Ross) (produced with FNZ)
- 07. "Pure Enough" (produced with FNZ)
- 08. "Zenith" (featuring Joey Badass) (produced with Freebase and FNZ)
- 09. "This Life" (produced with FNZ)

=== Ronny J ===
- "IN THE FLESH"
- "Emoji" (feat. XXXTentacion)

=== Ski Mask The Slump God ===
- "NEWWORLDORDER" (feat. Lil Tracy and Lil Peep) (produced with Slight)

=== Ski Mask The Slump God- Drown In Designer & YouWillRegret (Reloaded) ===
- "Take A Step Back" (featuring XXXTentacion)
- "Dr. Eggman" (featuring Keith Ape)

=== XXXTentacion ===
- "#ImSippinTeaInYoHood"

=== Yoshi Thompkins ===
- "HIT THE DIRT" (featuring XXXTentacion)

== 2017 ==
=== Bhad Bhabie – 15 ===
- 11. "Hi Bich"

=== Bhad Bhabie ===
- "Whachu Know"

=== Denzel Curry – 13 ===
- 03. "Equalizer" (featuring Ronny J)

=== Lil Pump ===
- "Movin" (featuring Smokepurpp)

=== Lil Pump – Lil Pump ===
- 03. "Smoke My Dope" (featuring Smokepurpp)
- 11. "Molly" (produced with Bighead)
- 14. "Flex Like Ouu" (produced with Frank Dukes & Danny Wolf)

=== PnB Rock - Catch These Vibes ===
- 11. "3X" (featuring Smokepurpp)

=== Smokepurpp ===
- "Geek A Lot"

=== Smokepurpp – Deadstar ===
- 01. "I Don't Know You" (featuring Chief Keef & Yo Gotti)
- 02. "Drop"
- 03. "Audi."
- 04. "OK" (featuring Lil Pump)
- 06. "No Safety"
- 08. "Fingers Blue" (featuring Travis Scott)
- 09. "Nose"
- 16. "Phantom"

=== XXXTentacion – A Ghetto Christmas Carol ===
- 01. "A Ghetto Christmas Carol" (produced with Cubeatz)
- 03. "Up Like an Insomniac Freestyle" (produced with XXXTentacion)
- 04. "Red Light!"

XXXTentacion

- "#PROUDCATOWNER #IHATERAPPERS #IEATPUSSY"

== 2018 ==
=== CA$HPASSION ===
- "Feel"

=== Comethazine- BAW$KEE ===
- 07. "Let It Eat" (featuring Ugly God)
- 09. "Bring Dat Bag Out" (featuring Lil Yachty)

=== Denzel Curry – TA13OO ===
- 06. "SWITCH IT UP | ZW1TCH 1T UP" (produced with Illmind)
- 13. "BLACK METAL TERRORIST | 13 M T" (produced with FNZ, Taz Taylor, and M-Sol)

=== Desiigner – L.O.D. ===
- 01. "Priice Tag"

=== Eminem – Kamikaze ===
- 01. "The Ringer" (produced with Illa da Producer and Eminem)
- 08. "Not Alike" (featuring Royce da 5'9") (produced with Tay Keith and Cubeatz)

=== Famous Dex ===
- "Ronny J On The Beat"
- "Up" (featuring Ski Mask the Slump God & Reggie Mills)

=== Famous Dex - Dex Meets Dexter ===
- 08. "HEMI"

=== Iggy Azalea – Survive the Summer ===
- 03. "Kream" (featuring Tyga) (produced with GT and Wallis Lane)

=== Jasiah ===
- "Shenanigans" (featuring Yung Bans)

=== Kid Buu - Blind for Love ===
- 02. "On Me"

=== KYLE ===
- "SUPERDUPERKYLE" (feat. MadeinTYO)

=== Leavemealone ===
- "Face"
- "No Smoke"

=== Lil Pump – Harverd Dropout ===
- 03. "I Love It" (with Kanye West) (produced with Kanye West, DJ Clark Kent and CBMix

=== LottoMoney ===
- "Fee Fi Fo Fum" (featuring 12svnteen and Tankhead)

=== Machine Gun Kelly – Binge ===
- 04. "Rap Devil" (produced with Nils)
- 06. "Lately" (produced with Nils and SlimXX)

=== MadeinTYO - Sincerely, Tokyo ===
- 05. "Outstanding" (produced with Wallis Lane)

=== Ronny J ===
- "Doesn't Matter"
- "WOTR"
- "CHOKER"
- "Loui'd Down" (featuring Ski Mask the Slump God)
- "BUTTERFLIES"

=== Ronny J - OMGRONNY ===
- 01. "Thriller (Forever)" (featuring Ski Mask the Slump God)
- 02. "One Time" (featuring Smokepurpp)
- 03. "824"
- 04. "Glacier" (featuring Denzel Curry)
- 05. "Costa Rica" (featuring Ski Mask the Slump God) (produced with Cubeatz)
- 06. "Fiji Island" (featuring Fat Nick)
- 07. "Snakes" (featuring Wifisfuneral)
- 08. "OHSHI"
- 09. "Trauma" (featuring Nell and Danny Towers)
- 10. "Houston" (featuring Denzel Curry)
- 11. "Banded Up" (featuring XXXTentacion)

=== Ski Mask the Slump God - Stokeley ===
- 04. "LA LA"

=== Smokepurpp ===
- "Big Bucks"

=== Ufo361 ===
- "Power" (featuring Capital Bra) (produced with Sonus030)
- "Kein Fugazi"

=== Uno The Activist ===
- "Ronny J Please Turn Me Up"

=== Wifisfuneral - Ethernet ===
- 03. "Genesis" (produced with Cubeatz)

=== XXXTentacion ===
- "Shining Like the Northstar"

=== Yoshi Thompkins ===
- "The Punisher"

=== Zoey Dollaz – Who Don't Like Dollaz 2 ===
- 03. "Moonwalk" (featuring Moneybagg Yo) (produced with Cubeatz)

=== 10k.Caash ===
- "FUN"

=== 458 KEEZ ===
- "Batmobile" (feat. Ski Mask the Slump God & Wifisfuneral)

=== 6ix9ine - Dummy Boy ===
- 07. "Bebe" (feat. Anuel AA)

=== Scarlxrd ===
- "Nx ice"

== 2019 ==
=== Denzel Curry - ZUU ===
- 12. "P.A.T." (feat. PlayThatBoiZay) (produced with FNZ)

=== DJ Scheme - Preseason EP ===
- 02. How You Feel? (Freestyle) [produced with DJ Scheme]

=== Higher Brothers - Five Stars ===
- 04. "One Punch Man" (feat. Ski Mask the Slump God and Denzel Curry)

=== Jasiah - Jasiah I Am ===
- 03. Shenanigans (feat. Yung Bans)

=== Lil Darkie ===
- SNEKENDASBÜT (feat. Bruhmanegod)

=== leavemealone ===
- "HOP"

=== Lil Yachty ===
- "GO KRAZY, GO STUPID FREESTYLE" (produced with Heavy Mellow)

=== Machine Gun Kelly - Hotel Diablo ===
- 02. "El Diablo" (produced with Nils)

=== Ronny J ===
- "Star"
- "PHILIPP PLEIN (Freestyle)"
- "INMYTHOUGHTS"
- "CHANEL FREESTYLE :)" (produced with V1T0 and Fewtile)
- "Gucci Lips"
- "Lights Out" (feat. Ty Dolla Sign & Rich The Kid)
- "Stack It Up" (feat. Lil Pump)

=== Ski Mask The Slump God ===
- "Carbonated Water: (Single)

=== XXXTentacion ===
- "#ProudCatOwnerRemix"

== 2020 ==
=== 6ix9ine - TattleTales ===
- 13. AVA (produced with RicoOnTheKeys & Tupun)

=== DJ Scheme - FAMILY ===
- 3. Thor's Hammer Worthy (feat. ZillaKami & Ski Mask the Slump God) (produced with FNZ, Nuri & DJ Scheme)
- 11. Blue Bills (feat. $NOT & Fenix Flexin) (produced with FNZ, Nuri & DJ Scheme)

=== J Balvin - Colores ===
- "Verde" (featuring and produced with Sky Rompiendo)

=== Juice WRLD - Legends Never Die ===
- 1. "Conversations"

=== Kanye West ===
- "Wash Us in the Blood" (feat. Travis Scott)

=== Lil Pump ===
- "LIL PIMP BIG MAGA STEPPIN"

=== Machine Gun Kelly ===
- "Bullet with Names" (feat.Young Thug, RJMrLA and Lil Duke)

=== Ronny J ===
- "Miami" (feat. Sfera Ebbasta, Duki)

=== SAINt JHN - While The World Was Burning ===
- 8. "Smack DVD" (feat. Kanye West) (produced with Dem Jointz & shadyboy)

=== Token ===
- "Curfew"

== 2021 ==
=== Kanye West - Donda ===
- 5. Hurricane (feat. The Weeknd & Lil Baby) (produced with Kanye West, BoogzDaBeast, DJ Khalil and Mike Dean)

=== Roddy Ricch - LIVE LIFE FAST ===
- 3. all good (feat. Future) (produced with Keefa and BeatsByJuko)

== 2022 ==
=== Comethazine - Bawskee 5 ===
- 8. Hit Loud

=== KayCyy - Get Used To It ===
- 8. New Rules (produced with Ambitiou$ and David Mems)

== 2023 ==
=== Don Toliver - Love Sick ===
- 15. Cinderella (feat. Tory y Moi)

=== Lil Pump - Lil Pump 2 ===
- 13. "Move It"

=== Rae Sremmurd - Sremm 4 Life ===
- 14. ADHD Anthem (Too Many Emotions) [produced with Dynox]
