= Carbonated Water (song) =

2019 single by Ski Mask the Slump God

Single by Ski Mask the Slump God
- Released: October 31, 2019
- Genre: SoundCloud rap; Hip hop
- Length: 2:21
- Label: Victor Victor; Republic
- Songwriters: Stokeley Clevon Goulbourne; Ronald Spence Jr.
- Producer: Ronny J

Ski Mask the Slump God singles chronology
"Costa Rica" (2019)	"Carbonated Water" (2019)	"Burn the Hoods" (2020)

"Carbonated Water" is a song by American rapper Ski Mask the Slump God, released on October 31, 2019 through Republic Records. It was written by Ski Mask the Slump God and Ronny J and produced by Ronny J.

This track samples the song "What in XXXTarnation" by XXXTentacion featuring Ski Mask the Slump God and produced by Stain.

== Background and composition ==
"Carbonated Water" is Ski Mask the Slump God's first single since his debut album Stokeley. The instrumental produced by Ronny J samples XXXTentacion's vocals from the song "What in XXXTarnation" from the mixtape Members Only, Vol. 3.

== Critical reception ==
Hypebeast described the song as being built around a raw and minimalistic beat produced by Ronny J, featuring prominent 808s, crisp hi-hats, and faint bell sounds. The publication highlighted Ski Mask the Slump God’s elastic vocal delivery and humorous wordplay, including references to The Fairly OddParents , the Green Goblin and the Grinch.

HotNewHipHop described “Carbonated Water” as a Ronny J-produced track suited to Ski Mask the Slump God’s intense delivery. The publication highlighted Ski Mask’s outlandish sense of humor and frequent geek-oriented references, characterizing the song’s style as reminiscent of a "hallucinogenic Saturday morning cartoon".

== Personnel ==
Credits adapted from Apple Music.

- Stokeley Clevon Goulbourne – artist, songwriter
- Ronald Spence Jr. – songwriter, producer
- Alex Tumay – mixing engineer

== Charts ==
Chart performance for "Carbonated Water"
Chart (2019)	Peak position
New Zealand Hot Singles (RMNZ)	21
