= 11th Dimension (album) =

Studio album by Ski Mask the Slump God
- Released: June 7, 2024
- Recorded: 2018–2024
- Label: Victor Victor; Republic
- Producer: Aaron Paris; Al B Smoov; Ambezza; ATL Jacob; Bass; Beautifulmvn; Bldbanks; Bobby Raps; Carlton McDowell; Charlie Coffeen; Dazegone; D2; Destin; DJ Scheme; Emerson Poulin; Erk; Ghostrage; Haze; Ilykimchi; Joba; KaiGoinKrazy; The Kount; Max Lord; Nik D; Nvbeel; Oogie Mane; Perdu; Prod Pink; Rex Kudo; RicoOnTheKeys; Ronny J; Shadyboy; Slice; Swaggyono; Synthetic; Thank You Fizzle; TisaKorean; Trgc; XXXTentacion; Xydra; Zuus

Ski Mask the Slump God chronology
Sin City The Mixtape (2021)	11th Dimension (2024)	The Lost Files (2025)

Singles from 11th Dimension
- 1. "Shibuya" Released: March 15, 2024; 2. "Headrush" Released: May 10, 2024; 3. "Wake Up!" Released: June 7, 2024

Professional ratings
Review scores
Source	Rating
RapReviews	7.5/10

11th Dimension is the second studio album by American rapper Ski Mask the Slump God. It was released through Victor Victor Worldwide and Republic Records on June 7, 2024. It is his first studio album in five years, following his debut studio album, Stokeley (2018). The album consists of 21 tracks and features guest appearances from Future, Skillibeng, Corbin, and posthumous vocals from XXXTentacion and Juice Wrld. 11th Dimension was preceded by two singles: "Shibuya" and "Headrush".

== Background and promotion ==
On October 25, 2022, Ski Mask released "Ooga Booga!" as the first promotional single. On the same day, Ski's friend DJ Scheme wrote out a tracklist for the album at the time and posted it on his Instagram Story. However, the next tracklist available shows that "Ooga Booga!" was removed. This tracklist also showed that the album would contain 17 songs, with the songs being scribbled down on paper again. Some artists were visible as features, such as Yeat, Doja Cat, Skillibeng and Juice Wrld.

On November 21, 2023, Ski Mask revealed the album's title as 11th Dimension. "Shibuya", the first single after the removal of "Ooga Booga!" from the album, was released on March 15, 2024.

On May 10, 2024, the second single, "Headrush", was released. This track was not on the original two track lists, so the track list had been altered again since the last track list was released.

== Track listing ==
11th Dimension track listing
No.	Title	Writer(s)	Producer(s)	Length
1.	"DragonTooth"	Stokeley Goulbourne; Zion Miller; Jammarius Hill	Prod Pink; Trgc	2:14
2.	"Monsters Inc." (with ATL Jacob featuring Future)	Goulbourne; Eric Wall; Nayvadius Cash; Jacob Canady	ATL Jacob; Slice	3:03
3.	"By Myself"	Goulbourne; Javier Mercado; Louis Esposito	Synthetic; Bass; Perdu	2:04
4.	"Earwax"	Goulbourne; Swaggyono	Swaggyono	1:55
5.	"Full Moon"	Goulbourne; Mathias Liyew; Nik Frascona	Ambezza; Nik D	2:03
6.	"Part the Sea"	Goulbourne; Jared Daley; Austin Carlisle; Wall; Patrick James Saint Fort	Dazegone; Bldbanks; Beautifulmvn	2:19
7.	"Jah's Interlude" (with XXXTentacion)	Jahseh Onfroy	XXXTentacion	1:02
8.	"WDYM"	Goulbourne; Carlton McDowell; Max Adam Lord; Emerson Poulin; Russell Boring; Rex Kudo; Charlie Coffeen; The Kount	Carlton McDowell; Max Lord; Emerson Poulin; Joba; Rex Kudo; Charlie Coffeen; The Kount	2:51
9.	"Tuk-Tuk"	Goulbourne; Gabriel Guerra; Destin	DJ Scheme; Destin	2:36
10.	"Wake Up!" (with Juice Wrld)	Goulbourne; Jarad Higgins; Domonic Patten	TisaKorean	2:15
11.	"Hulk"	Goulbourne; Nelida Yew; Jordan Ortiz; Xydra	Ilykimchi; Oogie Mane; Xydra	2:26
12.	"Headrush"	Goulbourne; Kai Hasegawa; Ethan Hayes; Zuus	KaiGoinKrazy; Haze; Zuus	2:50
13.	"Frozen One"	Goulbourne; Nvbeel	Nvbeel	1:36
14.	"KillStreak"	Goulbourne; Nvbeel; D2	Nvbeel; D2	2:16
15.	"From Yard" (featuring Skillibeng)	Goulbourne; Emwah Warmington; Lord; McDowell	Max Lord; Carlton	2:13
16.	"Him Jung Un"	Goulbourne; Lord; McDowell; Robert Richardson	Bobby Raps; Max Lord	1:41
17.	"Let It Breathe"	Goulbourne; Rex Kudo; The Kount; Aaron Paris; Boring; Charlie Coffeen; Erik Hörstedt; McDowell	Rex Kudo; The Kount; Aaron Paris; Joba; Charlie Coffeen; Erk; Carlton McDowell	2:05
18.	"Mandalorian"	Goulbourne; Shady El Sayed; Ronald Spence, Jr.; RicoOnTheKeys	Ronny J; Shadyboy; RicoOnTheKeys	1:31
19.	"Jump"	Goulbourne; Nvbeel; D2; Yew	Nvbeel; D2; Ilykimchi	1:53
20.	"Shibuya"	Goulbourne; Alec Tolkin; Lord; Joshua Goldenberg	Al B Smoov; Max Lord; Thank You Fizzle	2:36
21.	"Go!" (with Corbin)	Goulbourne; Corbin Smidzik; Chandler Ingram; Fort	Ghostrage; Beautifulmvn	3:10
Total length:				46:48

Notes

- "Jah's Interlude" is a direct sample of isolated vocals from "Hope (Freestyle)" from XXXTentacion's ? (Deluxe), originally released in September 2019.

== Charts ==
Chart performance
Chart (2024)	Peak position
Belgian Albums (Ultratop Flanders)	186
Canadian Albums (Billboard)	100
US Billboard 200	55
US Top R&B/Hip-Hop Albums (Billboard)	15
