= Gospel (song) =

Single by Rich Brian, Keith Ape, and XXXTentacion
- Released: May 12, 2017
- Recorded: 2016 (XXXTentacion); 2017 (Rich Brian & Keith Ape)
- Genre: Trap metal
- Length: 2:53
- Label: 88rising; Empire
- Songwriters: Brian Imanuel; Lee Dongheon; Jahseh Onfroy; Ronald Spence, Jr.
- Producer: Ronny J

Rich Brian singles chronology
"Back At It" (2017)	"Gospel" (2017)	"Glow Like Dat" (2017)

Keith Ape singles chronology
"Diamonds" (2016)	"Gospel" (2017)	"Achoo" (2017)

XXXTentacion singles chronology
"What in XXXTarnation" (2017)	"Gospel" / "Take a Step Back" (2017)	"Revenge" (2017)

"Gospel" is a song by Indonesian rapper Rich Brian, South Korean rapper Keith Ape, and American rapper and singer XXXTentacion. Written alongside producer Ronny J, it was released on May 12, 2017, by 88rising Music and Empire Distribution.

== Background ==
This song was first performed at Rich Brian's Rolling Loud set on May 5, 2017. In an interview with Genius about how the song came together, Rich Brian said:

I followed X on Twitter, and I mentioned him on something. My manager was like, “Oh, you fuck with X?” And then, I’m like, “Yeah. Of course.” X is actually friends with Ronny J, and I was friends with Ronny J at the time. I still am. Ronny J just FaceTimed me. They were together, and X was like, “Oh, what’s up dude? I know you.” And I was like, “Oh shit. That’s cool.” X recorded his verse right there. Ronny J already had the beat. I picked it out, because it was super cool, and I liked it. X got on it, and then after a while, the whole shit happened where he went to jail and stuff. So, we sat on the track a little bit. Then Keith Ape was like, “Yo, can I get on that?” And I was like, “Of course.” Because, everybody was like, “You should collaborate with Keith ape! You guys are both fucking Asian and shit.” Alright, whatever. Let’s do it. So, I was down. And then, X got out of jail, and he’d already had his verse on the song. Then Keith recorded his verse. I actually recorded my verse last.

== Charts ==
Chart (2017)	Peak position
New Zealand Heatseekers (RMNZ)	4
US Bubbling Under R&B/Hip-Hop Singles (Billboard)	7

== Certifications ==
Region	Certification	Certified units/sales
New Zealand (RMNZ)	Gold	15,000^{‡}
United States (RIAA)	Gold	500,000^{‡}
^{‡} Sales+streaming figures based on certification alone.
