= List of Nuyorican rappers =

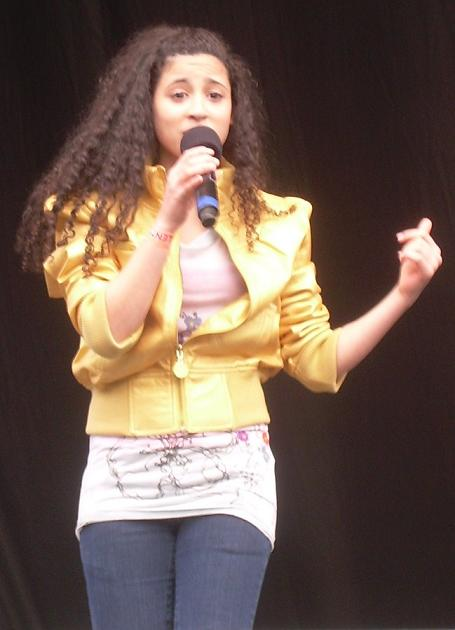
P-Star

The following is a list of notable Nuyorican/Stateside Puerto Rican

- Bia (rapper) (Medford)
- Big Pun (The Bronx)
- Bodega Bamz (New York City)
- Chino XL (The Bronx)
- CJ (rapper) (Staten Island)
- Diamond (rapper) (Atlanta)
- Fat Joe (The Bronx)
- Iann Dior (Corpus Christi)
- Jim Jones (Harlem)
- J.I the Prince of N.Y (Brooklyn)
- Joell Ortiz (Brooklyn)
- Kay Flock (The Bronx)
- Kevin Gates (Baton Rouge)
- K7 (musician) (New York City)
- Kid Buu (rapper) (Miami)
- Lin-Manuel Miranda (New York City)
- Lloyd Banks (South Jamaica)
- Nitty Scott, MC (Brooklyn)
- N.O.R.E. (Queens)
- Prince Markie Dee (Brooklyn)
- Princess Nokia (Harlem)
- Prince Whipper Whip (New York City)
- P-Star (Harlem)
- Residente (New York City)
- Rico Nasty (Palmer Park)
- Siya (Brooklyn)
- Skinnyfromthe9 (Somerville)
- Thirstin Howl III (Brooklyn)
- Tony Sunshine (The Bronx)
- Wifisfuneral (West Palm Beach)
- Wiki (rapper) (New York City)
- Young M.A (Brooklyn)
