= Take a Step Back =

Single by Ski Mask the Slump God featuring XXXTentacion

Single by Ski Mask the Slump God featuring XXXTentacion

from the album Drown in Designer and You Will Regret
- Released: May 12, 2017
- Recorded: 2016
- Genre: Punk rock; trap metal
- Length: 3:30
- Label: Victor Victor; Republic
- Songwriters: Jahseh Onfroy; Stokeley Goulbourne; Ronald Spence
- Producer: Ronny J

Ski Mask the Slump God singles chronology
"BabyWipe" (2017)	"Take a Step Back" (2017)	"Catch Me Outside" (2017)

XXXTentacion singles chronology
"What in XXXTarnation" (2017)	"Take a Step Back" / "Gospel" (2017)	"Revenge" (2017)

"Take a Step Back" is a song by American rapper Ski Mask the Slump God featuring fellow American rapper XXXTentacion. The song was released as a single for Ski Mask's mixtape You Will Regret. It was produced by Ronny J.

== Background ==
"Take a Step Back" was originally released for Ski Mask the Slump God's mixtape Drown in Designer on May 16, 2016 and as a single for Ski Mask's mixtape You Will Regret on May 12, 2017. The song has been described as a "mosh pit anthem" and as the unofficial theme of rap festivals. The song utilizes elements of punk rock and heavy metal. The song was recorded on a pair of iPhone earbuds, giving it a distorted sound, but Ski Mask said that he and XXXTentacion used it to their advantage.

A feud ensued between Ski Mask and X between late 2017 and early 2018, with Ski Mask saying he wanted to be seen as an individual rapper rather than just X's partner. X briefly said he would quit music until Ski Mask would be his friend again. At the 2018 Rolling Loud festival while Ski Mask was set to perform, the two surprised the audience with X joining Ski Mask to perform "Take A Step Back", ending the feud.

== Personnel ==
- Ski Mask the Slump God – primary artist, songwriter
- XXXTentacion – featured artist, songwriter
- Ronny J – producer, songwriter

== Certifications ==
Certifications
Region	Certification	Certified units/sales
Brazil (Pro-Música Brasil)	Gold	30,000^{‡}
New Zealand (RMNZ)	Platinum	30,000^{‡}
United Kingdom (BPI)	Silver	200,000^{‡}
United States (RIAA)	2× Platinum	2,000,000^{‡}
^{‡} Sales+streaming figures based on certification alone.
