= They Cloned Tyrone (soundtrack) =

They Cloned Tyrone (Music from and Inspired by the Netflix Film)

Soundtrack album by various artists
- Released: July 21, 2023
- Genre: Hip hop, pop
- Length: 50:32
- Label: Republic

They Cloned Tyrone (Music from and Inspired by the Netflix Film) is the soundtrack to the 2023 film of the same name, released through Republic Records on July 21, 2023. The album consisted of hip hop, pop and rock music from several artists such as Teddy Walton, Trinidad James, PJ, Ski Mask the Slump God, Erykah Badu and Diana Ross. The album also featured a remix song of Badu's "Tyrone" entitled as "Who Cloned Tyrone".

== Track listing ==
No.	Title	Artist(s)	Length
1.	"w250hz"	Uncle See'J	2:40
2.	"God's Wheel"	Teddy Walton	2:00
3.	"Sheisty"	Trinidad James	3:03
4.	"Drunk AF"	PJ	2:34
5.	"Constellation"	Ski Mask the Slump God	2:17
6.	"See The Light" (Interlude)	Jcksn Ave	1:27
7.	"Untoward"	12 oz lb cake	4:08
8.	"Winner Chicken Dinner"	Big K.R.I.T.	2:12
9.	"Feelin Good"	Saba	2:58
10.	"Nuthin'"	Ayzha Nyree	2:40
11.	"Round and Round"	FCG HEEM	2:24
12.	"Chemistry" (Interlude)	Jcksn Ave	2:01
13.	"Who Cloned Tyrone"	Erykah Badu	3:27
14.	"I Was Thinkin'"	Reggie	2:20
15.	"Love Hangover"	Diana Ross	7:46
16.	"Peeping Tom"	Fat Ron	4:04
17.	"You Ain't Gotta Go Home"	12 oz lb cake	2:31
Total length:			50:32

== Reception ==
Writing for Digital Spy, Kelechi Ehenulo summarised "Its soundtrack, laced with funk music, creates a mood before changing tune for the sounds of Al B Sure, Diana Ross and Erykah Badu." Elliott Wishnefsky of FandomWire summarised "The soundtrack is a big highlight, featuring a mix of classic soul and hip-hop tracks." Amon Warrmann of Empire wrote "the funky, bass-heavy score by Desmond Murray and Pierre Charles meshes well with the astutely curated soundtrack". Noel Murray of Los Angeles Times complimented the film's "grainy look and retro soundtrack" which is akin to a 1970s blaxploitation picture. Lovia Gyarkaye of The Hollywood Reporter wrote that the characters' motive "complements the score from composers Pierre Charles and Desmond Murray as well as Philippe Pierre and Stephanie Diaz-Matos' music supervision. The latter pair make savvy use of hits ranging from Alicia Myers' 'I Want to Thank You' to Diana Ross' 'Love Hangover' and a new mix of Erykah Badu's 'Tyrone.'" Maddy Mussen of Evening Standard wrote "The soundtrack is full of funk, soul and groove, which is used brilliantly to unsettle the viewer." Tara Brady of The Irish Times wrote that the soundtrack "seals the deal".

== Additional music ==
The following tracks were not included in the soundtrack. However, the selected tracks were included in the official playlist curated by Netflix.

- "Nite and Day" by Al B. Sure!
- "Saturday Love" by Cherrelle and Alexander O'Neal
- "Socks and Slides" by Uncle See' J and LB
- "K.O.B." by FB Boochie
- "I’d Rather Be with You" by Bootsy Collins
- "So Tired" by Twelve’len
- "Don't Stop 'Til You Get Enough" by Michael Jackson
- "What I Say" by Point 0 with Twork D, PPMG Niko Gramz
- "I Want to Thank You" by Alicia Myers
- "Nosferatu" by Ben Kenobe
- "Back That Azz Up" by Om'Mas Keith
- "I'm Going Down" by Jamie Foxx and Teyonah Parris
- "Where Dem Dollas At" by Gangsta Boo feat. DJ Paul & Juicy J
- "I Need A Hug" by Ottie James
- "Umi See" by Uncle See’ J
- "Mysterious Vibes" by The Blackbyrds
- "Sage" by Shariff Earp
- "Trial Time" by The Last Mr. Bigg
- "Chosen Don" by P50 and Yung Herm
- "I’ll Be Good" by René & Angela
- "Waiting On" by Herm and Sleebo Slick
