= Foot Fungus (song) =

2018 song by Ski Mask the Slump God

Song by Ski Mask the Slump God

from the album Stokeley
- Released: November 30, 2018
- Length: 2:09
- Label: Victor Victor; Republic
- Songwriter(s): Stokeley Goulbourne; Kenneth Blume III; Jahphet Landis; Calvin Broadus; Chad Hugo; Pharrell Williams
- Producer(s): Kenny Beats; Roofeeo

"Foot Fungus" is a song by American rapper Ski Mask the Slump God, released from his debut studio album Stokeley (2018). It was produced by Kenny Beats and Roofeeo.

== Background ==
Kenny Beats created the beat of the song around the time he was working on rapper Vince Staples' album FM!. He had decided to produce one reminiscent of 1990's music inspired by The Neptunes and Timbaland. As for the sequencing of the beat, Kenny said: "Even if you only have nine sounds in your beat, ten sounds in your beat, change shit up. So when the rapper is rapping, even if they do one flow the whole way, the way the beat's movin', the way the beat drops out and comes back in, it keeps the energy up." He also used a censor beep sound effect throughout the song, which according to him: "It makes you think of something illegal. Makes you think of something bad. If you're casually listening to this beat or to this song, these little effects are going to be the things that makes someone go, 'Oh, what was that?' It's not goin' be your kick, it's not goin' be how hard your 808 is. It's gonna be the personality you put into it that other people aren't going to."

In the song, Ski Mask the Slump God interpolates "Drop It Like It's Hot" by Snoop Dogg featuring Pharrell Williams.

== Critical reception ==
John Norris of Billboard wrote in regard to Stokeley, "the good times are delivered on tracks like the bouncing 'Foot Fungus'". Paul Thompson of Vulture included the song as one of the most minimal songs from the album, which he commented are "intriguing for the pure athleticism of the rapping."

== Charts ==
Chart (2018)	Peak position
Canada (Canadian Hot 100)	72
New Zealand Hot Singles (RMNZ)	8
US Billboard Hot 100	81
US Hot R&B/Hip-Hop Songs (Billboard)	45

== Certifications ==
Region	Certification	Certified units/sales
New Zealand (RMNZ)	Platinum	30,000^{‡}
United States (RIAA)	Platinum	1,000,000^{‡}
^{‡} Sales+streaming figures based on certification alone.
