= Killshot (song) =

2018 diss track by Eminem

Single by Eminem
- Released: September 14, 2018
- Recorded: September 2018
- Genre: Hip-hop; hardcore hip-hop; trap
- Length: 4:13
- Label: Shady; Aftermath; Interscope
- Songwriter: Marshall Mathers
- Producer: IllaDaProducer

Eminem singles chronology
"Fall" (2018)	"Killshot" (2018)	"Venom" (2018)

"Killshot" is a diss track written and recorded by American rapper Eminem. It was released on September 14, 2018, through Shady Records, Aftermath Entertainment, and Interscope Records, amidst his feud with American musician Machine Gun Kelly. It serves as Eminem's response to Kelly's diss track "Rap Devil".

Primarily produced by Illa da Producer, "Killshot" is a grimy hip-hop track composed of a minimalist beat with sharp piano keys and a deep bassline. Its lyrics target Kelly, mocking his appearance, career, and lyrical abilities while addressing his critiques from "Rap Devil". Eminem also brings up his longevity in the music industry and his influence on younger artists. The track further criticizes Kelly for trying to use their feud to elevate his career and warns him that he'll "be putting your name, next to Ja, next to Benzino" if he continues the beef.

"Killshot" was met with widespread acclaim from music critics, who praised Eminem's lyrical prowess and delivery. It broke the record for the biggest YouTube debut for a hip-hop song, accumulating 38.1 million views within 24 hours. The song charted at number one in Canada while reaching the top 10 in Hungary, New Zealand, and the United States as well as the top 20 in Australia, Ireland, Lithuania, Norway, Scotland, Slovakia, and the United Kingdom.

== Background and release ==
In 2012, Machine Gun Kelly (MGK) posted a tweet about Eminem's daughter, Hailie Mathers (who was then sixteen). The tweet read, "ok so I just saw a picture of Eminem's daughter...and I have to say, she is hot as fuck, in the most respectful way possible cuz Em is king". MGK claimed to apologize to Eminem behind the scenes. After this, in 2015, MGK claimed that Eminem banned him from going to Shade 45, a SiriusXM radio station owned by Eminem. In 2017, MGK was on Power 106 FM and did a freestyle with The LA Leakers. During this, he again claimed Eminem had banned him from Shade 45. MGK also collaborated on a song with Tech N9ne in March 2018, and sent disses towards Eminem. On August 31, 2018, Eminem released a surprise album Kamikaze in which he dissed several artists, including MGK.

On the song "Not Alike" from Kamikaze, Eminem made several disses aimed at MGK. Two days later, MGK responded to "Not Alike" with the song "Rap Devil", releasing a music video for the song as well on September 3, 2018. After MGK's response, Eminem released an interview with Sway Calloway, in which Eminem was asked about the feud. Eminem explained that he did not want to respond initially, because it would just benefit MGK's exposure. On September 14, 2018, Eminem released "Killshot". On September 19, 2018, the song was officially released as a single.

== Critical reception ==
Vulture said "Eminem's Machine Gun Kelly response is the best he's sounded in half a decade".

== Commercial performance ==
"Killshot" debuted at number three on the US Billboard Hot 100 in its first week after gaining over 38.1 million views within the first 24 hours of releasing on YouTube, making it the nineteenth-most-viewed video in the first 24 hours, and the most for an audio-only release on the YouTube platform. It also held the biggest YouTube debut for a hip-hop video ever, surpassing Kanye West's and Lil Pump's "I Love It", beating the record just the week before. This was beaten by 6ix9ine's debut of "Gooba" in 2020.

== Response ==
Machine Gun Kelly responded in a tweet, criticizing Eminem for what he perceived as a slow response. Rapper Jay Electronica criticized Eminem for a line in the song where he jokingly accused Sean "Diddy" Combs of having Tupac Shakur killed. After this, Electronica had then deactivated his social media profiles. Rapper Iggy Azalea's name was dropped in the song and she let out a series of tweets reacting to and criticizing the lyrics, calling the bars "lazy". Halsey also responded to her name being dropped in reference to her relationship with rapper G-Eazy in a tweet saying, "I'm jus saying my pops had to hear a grown man talk about his daughter getting fucked while that man simultaneously defended his own daughter." She later added, "I'm not proud. I just don't care. They can argue about record sales. My album sold more copies than each of theirs."

== Charts ==
=== Weekly charts ===
Chart (2018)	Peak position
Australia (ARIA)	11
Austria (Ö3 Austria Top 40)	42
Belgium (Ultratip Bubbling Under Flanders)	29
Canada Hot 100 (Billboard)	1
Czech Republic Singles Digital (ČNS IFPI)	27
Denmark (Tracklisten)	31
Germany (GfK)	81
Greece International Digital Singles (IFPI)	8
Hungary (Single Top 40)	6
Hungary (Stream Top 40)	15
Ireland (IRMA)	17
Lithuania (AGATA)	11
Netherlands (Single Top 100)	76
New Zealand (Recorded Music NZ)	6
Norway (VG-lista)	18
Portugal (AFP)	46
Scotland Singles (OCC)	11
Slovakia Singles Digital (ČNS IFPI)	16
Sweden (Sverigetopplistan)	23
Switzerland (Schweizer Hitparade)	30
UK Singles (OCC)	13
US Billboard Hot 100	3
US Hot R&B/Hip-Hop Songs (Billboard)	2

=== Year-end charts ===
Chart (2018)	Position
US Hot R&B/Hip-Hop Songs (Billboard)	83

== Certifications ==
Region	Certification	Certified units/sales
Australia (ARIA)	2× Platinum	140,000^{‡}
Brazil (Pro-Música Brasil)	Platinum	40,000^{‡}
Denmark (IFPI Danmark)	Gold	45,000^{‡}
New Zealand (RMNZ)	2× Platinum	60,000^{‡}
Portugal (AFP)	Platinum	10,000^{‡}
United Kingdom (BPI)	Platinum	600,000^{‡}
^{‡} Sales+streaming figures based on certification alone.

== Release history ==
Country	Date	Format	Label	Ref.
Various	September 14, 2018	Streaming (YouTube–Audiomack exclusive)	Shady; Aftermath; Interscope	
Various	September 19, 2018	Digital download	Shady; Aftermath; Interscope	

== See also ==
- List of notable diss tracks
