= Not Alike =

2018 diss song by Eminem & Royce da 5'9"

Song by Eminem featuring Royce da 5'9"

from the album Kamikaze
- Released: August 31, 2018
- Genre: Hip hop; trap
- Length: 4:48
- Label: Aftermath; Interscope; Shady
- Songwriters: Marshall Mathers; Brytavious Chambers; Ronald Spence Jr.; Ryan Montgomery
- Producers: Tay Keith; Ronny J; Eminem; Cubeatz

"Not Alike" is a diss track by American rapper Eminem featuring Royce da 5'9" from Eminem's tenth studio album Kamikaze (2018). It reached the top 40 in Australia, Canada, New Zealand, Sweden, and the United States. It was written by the artists alongside producers Tay Keith and Ronny J with more production credits going to Eminem and Cubeatz. It is a diss track aimed at several artists, most notably mgk (Machine Gun Kelly).

== Composition ==
In the first part of the song, the Tay Keith-produced instrumental that interpolates BlocBoy JB's "Look Alive", while Eminem imitates the flow of Migos' "Bad and Boujee". The second beat was produced by Ronny J. The song disses rapper Machine Gun Kelly, who called Eminem's daughter, Hailie Jade, "hot as fuck" in 2012. At the time, Kelly was 22 and Hailie was 16. The song features co-production by Cubeatz.

== Response ==
On September 3, 2018, Machine Gun Kelly released "Rap Devil", a response to Not Alike. On September 14, 2018, Eminem responded to Rap Devil, releasing the diss track "Killshot".

== Charts ==
Chart (2018)	Peak position
Australia (ARIA)	23
Austria (Ö3 Austria Top 40)	39
Canada Hot 100 (Billboard)	18
Czech Republic Singles Digital (ČNS IFPI)	17
France (SNEP)	77
Germany (GfK)	57
Greece Digital International Singles (IFPI)	5
Hungary (Stream Top 40)	18
Italy (FIMI)	48
Netherlands (Single Top 100)	50
New Zealand (Recorded Music NZ)	20
Norway (VG-lista)	24
Portugal (AFP)	21
Slovakia Singles Digital (ČNS IFPI)	7
Sweden (Sverigetopplistan)	42
US Billboard Hot 100	24
US Hot R&B/Hip-Hop Songs (Billboard)	17

== Certifications ==
Region	Certification	Certified units/sales
Australia (ARIA)	Platinum	70,000^{‡}
Brazil (Pro-Música Brasil)	Gold	20,000^{‡}
New Zealand (RMNZ)	Gold	15,000^{‡}
United Kingdom (BPI)	Silver	200,000^{‡}
United States (RIAA)	Gold	500,000^{‡}
^{‡} Sales+streaming figures based on certification alone.
