= Sin City The Mixtape =

Mixtape by Ski Mask the Slump God
- Released: June 25, 2021
- Recorded: 2021
- Genre: Hip hop
- Length: 17:32
- Labels: Victor Victor; Republic
- Producers: Ronny J; Slice; Two Five; Nuri; Kenny Beats; John Cunningham

Ski Mask the Slump God chronology
Stokeley (2018)	Sin City The Mixtape (2021)	11th Dimension (2024)

Sin City The Mixtape is the fourth mixtape by American rapper Ski Mask the Slump God. It was released on June 25, 2021 through Victor Victor Worldwide and Republic Records. The project consists of 9 solo tracks from Ski Mask and production handled by Ronny J, Slice, Two Five, Nuri, Kenny Beats and John Cunningham.

== Background and composition ==
According to an interview with XXL, the mixtape is inspired by the comic book series, Sin City, by Frank Miller and its 2005 film adaptation by Robert Rodriguez, which is one of Ski’s favorite movies. Ski Mask’s father also rapped under the name "Sin City 954", which is another inspiration for the mixtape’s title.

The cover artwork for the mixtape draws inspiration from the film Sin City, adopting a neo-noir aesthetic characterized by a predominantly black-and-white palette with red accents.

According to Hypebeast, Sin City The Mixtape consists of nine tracks with a runtime of just under 20 minutes and features a wild and menacing atmosphere comparable to that of the film of the same name.

HotNewHipHop described Ski Mask's delivery on the project as aggressive.

== Critical reception ==
Pitchfork rated Sin City the Mixtape 6.7 out of 10, praising Ski Mask the Slump God's technical rapping ability, rapid-fire flow, and the mixtape's energetic, fast-paced production. The publication also noted the extensive pop culture references on the mixtape, while criticizing some of its lyrics for lacking meaningful context. It highlighted "Lost in Time" as a more fragile song and "Mental Magneto" as an example of the more introspective side of Ski Mask's music.

== Track listing ==
Sin City The Mixtape track listing
No.	Title	Writer(s)	Producer(s)	Length
1.	"Intro"	Stokeley Goulbourne; Ronald Spence, Jr.	Ronny J	1:43
2.	"Dr. Suess"	Goulbourne; James Russell	Slice	2:33
3.	"Admit It"	Goulbourne; Spence Jr.; Leshchenko Artem Pavlovich	Ronny J; Two Five	1:33
4.	"The Matrix"	Goulbourne; Spence Jr.	Ronny J	2:10
5.	"Ya!"	Goulbourne; Nuri; Russell	Nuri; Slice	1:50
6.	"Merlin's Staff"	Goulbourne; Kenneth Charles Blume III	Kenny Beats	2:04
7.	"Lost in Time"	Goulbourne; John Cunningham	John Cunningham	2:01
8.	"Fire Hazard"	Goulbourne; Russell	Slice	1:57
9.	"Mental Magneto"	Goulbourne; Cunningham	John Cunningham	1:37
Total length:				17:32
