= Beware the Book of Eli =

Mixtape by Ski Mask the Slump God
- Released: May 11, 2018
- Recorded: 2017–2018
- Genres: Hip hop; psychedelic rap
- Length: 21:48
- Labels: Victor Victor; Republic
- Producers: ArnoldIsDead; Cubeatz; FH3 Beats; Jimmy Duval; Kashaka; Murda Beatz; Natra Average; Timbaland

Ski Mask the Slump God chronology
You Will Regret (2017)	Beware the Book of Eli (2018)	Stokeley (2018)

Singles from Beware the Book of Eli
- 1. "Bukkake" Released: December 16, 2017; 2. "Child's Play" Released: January 2, 2018; 3. "DoIHaveTheSause?" Released: February 23, 2018

Beware the Book of Eli (stylized in all caps) is the third mixtape by American rapper Ski Mask the Slump God. It was officially released on May 11, 2018, by Victor Victor Worldwide and Republic Records, after it was originally released on May 1, 2018 on SoundCloud, but was quickly taken down by his management at the time.

Recording sessions took place from 2017 to 2018, which features production from Murda Beatz, Timbaland, Jimmy Duval and Natra Average, among others. The album features guest appearances from Rich the Kid, Ronny J, Danny Towers and SahBabii.

Professional ratings
Review scores
Source	Rating
AllMusic	3/5 stars

== Track listing ==
Credits adapted from Tidal.

No.	Title	Writer(s)	Producer(s)	Length
1.	"Lost Souls" (featuring Rich the Kid)	Stokeley Goulbourne; Dimitri Roger; Christopher Gibbs	Natra Average	2:46
2.	"Run"	Goulbourne; Timothy Mosley	Timbaland	1:47
3.	"Throwaway" (featuring Ronny J)	Goulbourne; Ronald Spence Jr.; Eli Evnen	Kashaka	1:48
4.	"Coolest Monkey in the Jungle" (featuring SahBabii)	Goulbourne; Saaheem Valdery; Shane Lindstrom; Kevin Gomringer; Tim Gomringer	Murda Beatz; Cubeatz	2:32
5.	"Suicide Season"	Goulbourne; Gibbs	Natra Average	2:12
6.	"DoIHaveTheSause?"	Goulbourne; Freddy Harris III	FH3 Beats	2:58
7.	"Geekin" (featuring Danny Towers)	Goulbourne; Daniel Towers; Gibbs	Natra Average	2:25
8.	"Child's Play"	Goulbourne; James Duval; Arnold Gutierrez Jr.	Jimmy Duval; ArnoldIsDead	1:37
9.	"Dapper Dan"	Goulbourne; Gibbs	Natra Average	1:35
10.	"Bukkake" (featuring Rich the Kid)	Goulbourne; Roger; Duval	Jimmy Duval	2:01
Total length:				21:45

Notes

- All tracks are stylized in all caps, except "DoIHaveTheSause?". For example, "Suicide Season" is stylized as "SUICIDE SEASON".
- "DoIHaveTheSause?" was titled "The Bees Knees" in the original release.
- "Child's Play" was titled "Poltergeist" in the original release.
- "SkiMeetsWorld", "With Vengeance", and "Worldwide" were removed from the final track list.

== Charts ==
Chart (2018)	Peak position
Canadian Albums (Billboard)	94
New Zealand Heatseeker Albums (RMNZ)	3
US Billboard 200	50
US Top R&B/Hip-Hop Albums (Billboard)	28
