= You Will Regret =

Mixtape by Ski Mask the Slump God
- Released: June 30, 2017 (initial); February 2, 2018 (reissue)
- Recorded: 2016–2017
- Genre: Hip hop
- Length: 34:05
- Label: Victor Victor; Republic
- Producer: BeatsCraze; CashMoneyAP; Corey Nutile; DeCicco Beats; DJ Patt; Good Intent; Jimmy Duval; Khaed; Kashaka; Ooweebaby; Ronny J; Stain; Timbaland; Tony Seltzer; Wilgun

Ski Mask the Slump God chronology
Drown in Designer (2016)	You Will Regret (2017)	Beware the Book of Eli (2018)

Singles from You Will Regret
- 1. "BabyWipe" Released: April 28, 2017; 2. "Take a Step Back" Released: May 12, 2017; 3. "Catch Me Outside" Released: June 13, 2017

Professional ratings
Review scores
Source	Rating
The Needle Drop	6/10

You Will Regret (originally and alternatively titled YouWillRegret) is the second mixtape by American rapper Ski Mask the Slump God. It was originally released on June 30, 2017, by Victor Victor Worldwide and Republic Records. The mixtape was reissued, titled You Will Regret (Reloaded) on February 2, 2018, with three extra songs, all previously released as singles. It features guest appearances from XXXTentacion, MadeinTYO, and DirtyFaceSmook. The mixtape debuted at number 195 on the US Billboard 200. The mixtape was supported by three singles: "BabyWipe", "Take a Step Back", and "Catch Me Outside", which are all certified gold by the Recording Industry Association of America (RIAA).

== Track listing ==
You Will Regret
No.	Title	Writer(s)	Producer(s)	Length
1.	"Rambo"	Stokeley Goulbourne; Eli Evnen; Christian Martin	Kashaka; Phosphate	1:49
2.	"JustLikeMyPiss" (featuring MadeinTYO)	Goulbourne; Malcolm Davis; Alex Petit; Corey Nutile	CashMoneyAP; Nutile	3:12
3.	"Bird is the Word"	Goulbourne; Evnen	Kashaka	3:58
4.	"BabyWipe"	Goulbourne; Petit; Sohang Guzman	CashMoneyAP; DeCicco Beats	2:48
5.	"Gone" (Interlude)	Goulbourne; Sydney Nyamurera	BeatsCraze; Wilgun	1:42
6.	"Adventure Time" (featuring DirtyFaceSmook)	Goulbourne; Horace Skinner, Jr.; Cameron Ailiff III	Good Intent	2:37
7.	"EverTookATab?"	Goulbourne; Darius Love	Stain; Wilgun	1:36
8.	"Winnie"	Goulbourne; Patrick Ivankovich	DJ Patt; Wilgun	1:47
9.	"Energy"	Goulbourne; James Duval; Christopher Trujillo	Jimmy Duval; Wilgun	3:44
10.	"H2O" (featuring XXXTentacion)	Goulbourne; Jahseh Onfroy; Khaed Moulton	Khaed	2:19
Total length:				25:32

You Will Regret (Reloaded) – Reissue
No.	Title	Writer(s)	Producer(s)	Length
1.	"Catch Me Outside"	Stokeley Goulbourne; Melissa Elliott; Timothy Mosley	Timbaland	2:25
2.	"Take a Step Back" (featuring XXXTentacion)	Goulbourne; Jahseh Onfroy; Ronald Spence, Jr.	Ronny J	3:30
3.	"WTF!?"	Goulbourne; Antonio Hernández; Justin Flammia	Tony Seltzer; Ooweebaby	2:23
4.	"Rambo"	Goulbourne; Eli Evnen; Christian Martin	Kashaka; Phosphate	1:49
5.	"JustLikeMyPiss" (featuring MadeinTYO)	Goulbourne; Malcolm Davis; Alex Petit; Corey Nutile	CashMoneyAP; Nutile	3:12
6.	"Bird is the Word"	Goulbourne; Evnen	Kashaka	3:58
7.	"BabyWipe"	Goulbourne; Petit; Sohang Guzman	CashMoneyAP; DeCicco Beats	2:48
8.	"Gone" (Interlude)	Goulbourne; Sydney Nyamurera	BeatsCraze; Wilgun	1:42
9.	"Adventure Time" (featuring DirtyFaceSmook)	Goulbourne; Horace Skinner, Jr.; Cameron Ailiff III	Good Intent	2:37
10.	"EverTookATab?"	Goulbourne; Darius Love	Stain; Wilgun	1:36
11.	"Winnie"	Goulbourne; Patrick Ivankovich	DJ Patt; Wilgun	1:47
12.	"Energy"	Goulbourne; James Duval; Christopher Trujillo	Jimmy Duval; Wilgun	3:44
13.	"H2O" (featuring XXXTentacion)	Goulbourne; Jahseh Onfroy; Khaed Moulton	Khaed	2:19
Total length:				33:58

Notes

- "Take a Step Back" originally appeared on Ski Mask's debut mixtape Drown in Designer
- "Catch Me Outside" is a remix of "She's a Bitch" by Missy Elliott
- "Psycho" originally appeared on the SoundCloud release before being removed

Sample credits

- "JustLikeMyPiss" contains a sample of "Dujdovna pesen", written by Yordan Yankov and performed by Jeni Batinova.
- "Catch Me Outside" contain samples of "She's a Bitch", written by Melissa Elliott and Timothy Mosley and performed by Missy Elliott.

== Personnel ==
- Tony Seltzer – recording (reissue: track 3)
- Gavin Dixon – recording (reissue: track 3)
- Corey Nutile – recording (reissue: track 5)
- Kashaka – recording (reissue: track 6)
- DeCicco Beats – recording (reissue: track 7)
- Summa Sam – recording (reissue: tracks 9, 11)
- Wilgun – mixing (reissue: track 2), recording (reissue: tracks 2, 8, 10)
- Fabian Marasciullo – mixing (reissue: tracks 1, 4–13)

== Charts ==
Chart (2018)	Peak position
US Billboard 200	195
