= Burn the Hoods =

2020 single by Ski Mask the Slump God

Single by Ski Mask the Slump God
- Released: July 24, 2020
- Genre: Political hip hop; Hip hop
- Length: 1:42
- Label: Victor Victor; Republic
- Songwriters: Stokeley Clevon Goulbourne; Kiowa Roukema
- Producer: YoungKio

Ski Mask the Slump God singles chronology
"Carbonated Water" (2019)	"Burn the Hoods" (2020)	"Soda" (2020)

Music video
- "Burn the Hoods" on YouTube

"Burn the Hoods" is a song by American rapper Ski Mask the Slump God, released on July 24, 2020 through Republic Records. It was written by Ski Mask the Slump God and YoungKio and produced by YoungKio.

== Background and composition ==
In an interview with Complex, Ski Mask said that the song was originally titled "Fuck Donald Trump". He said he wanted to write a song that would express his views on white supremacy and Donald Trump. He later changed the title to "Burn the Hoods", explaining that it was a way of referencing the hoods worn by members of the Ku Klux Klan. Ski Mask stated that the song was political, but wanted to keep its presentation true to the playful style he is known for in his music. Ski Mask also said that he wanted to use his platform to express his views on issues he considered wrong.

The song is built around a production described as resembling a horror movie score. Ski Mask the Slump God delivers the track with off-kilter rhyme patterns, while his vocals are characterized by an energetic and forceful delivery.

== Personnel ==
Credits adapted from Apple Music.

- Stokeley Clevon Goulbourne – artist, songwriter
- Kiowa Roukema – songwriter, producer
- Slice - mixing engineer

== Charts ==
Chart performance for "Burn the Hoods"
Chart (2020)	Peak position
US Bubbling Under Hot 100 (Billboard)	22

== Music video ==
A music video directed by Cole Bennett was also released on July 24, 2020. The video opens with Ski Mask the Slump God standing in front of a burning Confederate flag. It then depicts Ski Mask and his crew attacking members of the Ku Klux Klan during a riot in a wooded area while wearing blue jumpsuits featuring the ''Ghostbusters'' logo.
