= Nuketown (song) =

2018 song by Ski Mask the Slump God and Juice Wrld

Song by Ski Mask the Slump God featuring Juice Wrld

from the album Stokeley
- Released: November 30, 2018
- Genre: Hip hop; hardcore hip hop; trap metal
- Length: 2:46
- Label: Victor Victor; Republic
- Songwriters: Stokeley Goulbourne; Eric Wall; Jarad Higgins
- Producer: Fresh ThPharmacy

Music video
- "Nuketown" on YouTube

"Nuketown," originally titled "Cutthroat" is a song by American rapper Ski Mask the Slump God, featuring fellow American rapper Juice Wrld. It was released as the second track of the former's debut studio album Stokeley.

== Background ==
"Nuketown" was the first track that the artists had recorded in mid-2018, being the only track that would be officially released during Juice's lifetime from the session. The track is very reminiscent of the loud aggressive tracks that Ski Mask used to release with the late XXXTentacion, with Juice Wrld paying homage to him on his verse on the track.

== Critical reception ==
The song received positive reviews. Writing for Pitchfork, Trey Alston praised the production and Ski Mask the Slump God's cadence, saying "[Ski Mask the Slump God] deflects attention from a mid-tempo, bass-heavy beat and allocates it to his jittery cadence". Donna-Claire Chesman of DJbooth labelled the song "[a] dark [shout] of the SoundCloud era".

== Music video ==
The official music video for "Nuketown" was released on October 25, 2019. Directed by Cole Bennett, the video sees Ski Mask the Slump God and Juice Wrld fighting enemies in a desert after their plane crashes. The video has over 75 million views as of January 2025.

== Chart performance ==
Chart (2018–2019)	Peak position
Canada Hot 100 (Billboard)	81
New Zealand Hot Singles (RMNZ)	10
US Billboard Hot 100	63
US Hot R&B/Hip-Hop Songs (Billboard)	32

== Certifications ==
Region	Certification	Certified units/sales
New Zealand (RMNZ)	Platinum	30,000^{‡}
United Kingdom (BPI)	Silver	200,000^{‡}
United States (RIAA)	2× Platinum	2,000,000^{‡}
^{‡} Sales+streaming figures based on certification alone.
