= Catch Me Outside 2 =

2025 single by Ski Mask the Slump God

Single by Ski Mask the Slump God
- Released: July 4, 2025
- Genre: Hip-hop
- Length: 2:06
- Label: Victor Victor; Empire
- Songwriters: Stokeley Goulbourne; Melissa Elliott; Timothy Mosley; James Smith; Taharqa Aleem; Tunde Ra Aleem; Jerry Callender; LeShaun Toureau; Isaac Wright; Malcolm McLaren; Trevor Horn; Anne Dudley
- Producer: Ski Mask the Slump God

Ski Mask the Slump God singles chronology
"Spin" (2025)	"Catch Me Outside 2" (2025)	"Broly" (2025)

Music video
- "Catch Me Outside 2" on YouTube

"Catch Me Outside 2" is a song by American rapper Ski Mask the Slump God, released on July 4, 2025. It is a sequel to his 2017 song "Catch Me Outside" and, like the prequel, is produced by Timbaland. The song samples "I'm Really Hot" by Missy Elliott.

== Composition ==
In the song, Ski Mask the Slump God raps about money, rappers trying to copy him, and his unique style, in rapid-fire delivery over the sample. He performs with a boastful and humorous tone, using punchlines and pop culture references throughout the song, including those from cartoons, anime and video games; Ski Mask compares himself to various characters such as Darth Vader and the Loch Ness Monster. He references the chorus of the original "Catch Me Outside", with some altered lyrics.

== Charts ==
Chart performance
Chart (2025)	Peak position
New Zealand Hot Singles (RMNZ)	16
US Bubbling Under Hot 100 (Billboard)	18
US Hot R&B/Hip-Hop Songs (Billboard)	26
