= The Lost Files (Ski Mask the Slump God album) =

Compilation album by Ski Mask the Slump God
- Released: July 30, 2025
- Recorded: 2014–2021
- Genre: Hip hop
- Length: 59:13
- Labels: Very Rare & Co; Empire Distribution
- Producers: Jimmy Duval; Dr. Flow; Bobby Raps; FnZ; LOTTO; DJ Patt; Timbaland; Method; Willie G; Rayayy; DJ Mooskie; Vznxm; Dr3am; Captaincrunch; BraveStarr; King Yosef; Treez Lowkey; Lanlord; MeltFaze; Makkmillion; Blackyouth; FLEABRAIN; Vinny Chango$; FH3 Beats; Bass Santana; Jamz TurnMeup

Ski Mask the Slump God chronology
11th Dimension (2024)	The Lost Files (2025)

Singles from The Lost Files
- 1. "Broly"; 2. "Fatality"; 3. "IWatchedHimDrown"

The Lost Files is the first compilation album by American rapper Ski Mask the Slump God. The compilation consists of 29 songs released between 2014 and 2021 that were initially unavailable commercially, with most having been available only on SoundCloud prior to the album's release. The compilation features guest appearances from fellow rappers XXXTentacion, Lil Pump, Denzel Curry, Craig Xen and Pollari. The project was supported by three singles in collaboration with XXXTentacion: "Broly", "Fatality" and "IWatchedHimDrown". The compilation was released on July 30, 2025 through Very Rare & Co and Empire Distribution.

== Background and release ==
The Lost Files marked Ski Mask the Slump God's first project following his signing with Empire Distribution and his first release under his new label, Very Rare & Co. The album compiled previously released tracks from earlier in his career that had not been made available on major streaming platforms. The compilation album was originally marketed as a 30-track project, however, the song "Freddy vs. Jason" with XXXTentacion was removed at the last minute due to unresolved sample-clearance issues.

== Track listing ==
The Lost Files track listing
No.	Title	Producer(s)	Length
1.	"Life is Short"	Jimmy Duval	2:20
2.	"IWatchedHimDrown" (with XXXTentacion)	Dr. Flow	1:24
3.	"Alien Sex"	Bobby Raps; FnZ; LOTTO	2:34
4.	"Where's the Blow!" (with Lil Pump)	DJ Patt	1:29
5.	"Nationwide"	Timbaland; Method	2:00
6.	"Psycho"	Rayayy	2:58
7.	"Broly" (with XXXTentacion)	DJ Mooskie	1:15
8.	"SLMD Remix (RIP Bernie Mac)"	Rayayy	2:12
9.	"Rickybobby!"	DJ Patt	2:25
10.	"I Like Bricks"	Vznxm; Dr3am	1:46
11.	"Unmask" (featuring Denzel Curry & Craig Xen)	DJ Patt; Captaincrunch	2:44
12.	"Vetty Vrocker"	Captaincrunch; DJ Patt	2:19
13.	"Apple Sauce"	Rayayy	2:21
14.	"Fatality" (with XXXTentacion)	BraveStarr	1:22
15.	"Billy & Mandy"	King Yosef	1:03
16.	"Kate Moss"	Treez Lowkey	2:15
17.	"Young Voorhees"	Lanlord	2:14
18.	"Shit Talk" (with Pollari)	DJ Patt	1:39
19.	"JFK"	MeltFaze	2:31
20.	"Pull Up"	Makkmillion	1:35
21.	"Holy"	Blackyouth	2:54
22.	"Wet"	FLEABRAIN	1:35
23.	"VR All Stars"	DJ Patt; Vinny Chango$	2:05
24.	"Chanel"	Vinny Chango$	1:06
25.	"Hell in a Cell"	Willie G	2:58
26.	"Iceberg"	FH3 Beats	1:46
27.	"Freaky Fred"	Bass Santana	2:12
28.	"Snomed"	DJ Patt	2:07
29.	"Skimeetsworld"	Jamz TurnMeup	1:54
Total length:			59:13

Notes

- "Kate Moss" has an uncredited feature from Treez Lowkey
- "VR All Stars" has an uncredited feature from Pollari
- "Chanel" had a feature from Matt Fuze on its SoundCloud version, but the feature was removed for unknown reasons.
- "Iceberg" had a feature from Kofi Harris on its SoundCloud version, but the feature was removed for unknown reasons.
- "Snomed" has an uncredited feature from DirtyFaceSmook

Samples

- "Alien Sex" samples "She's a Bitch" by Missy Elliott
- "Nationwide" samples "Hard in da Paint" by Waka Flocka Flame and "Drop" by Timbaland & Magoo
- "Psycho" samples "Psychosocial" by Slipknot
- "SLMD Remix (RIP Bernie Mac)" is a remix of "Stuntin' Like My Daddy" by Birdman & Lil Wayne
- "Apple Sauce" samples the soundtrack of Jaws

== Reception ==
The Lost Files received coverage largely centered on its archival nature and its function as a streaming-era release of Ski Mask the Slump God's earlier SoundCloud material. Hypebeast described the project as a collection of "SoundCloud classics" newly made available on streaming platforms, highlighting fan-favorite tracks and the inclusion of guest appearances from artists such as XXXTentacion, Denzel Curry, Craig Xen, Lil Pump, and Pollari.

HotNewHipHop similarly framed the album as a return to Ski Mask’s roots, characterizing it as a large-scale release of previously online-only recordings aimed at long-time listeners and streaming audiences.

In a roundup of new hip-hop releases, XXL positioned The Lost Files as a "vault" release intended for Ski Mask's established fanbase, noting that the compilation brought older tracks to digital streaming platforms and included collaborations such as "Broly" and "Fatality" with XXXTentacion.

iHeartRadio also emphasized the compilation's role in making Ski Mask's earlier songs available on major platforms, describing the album as a collection of tracks from his SoundCloud era released on streaming services for the first time.
