= BabyWipe =

Single by Ski Mask the Slump God

Single by Ski Mask the Slump God

from the album You Will Regret
- Released: April 28, 2017
- Genre: Hip hop
- Length: 2:48
- Label: Victor Victor; Republic
- Songwriters: Stokeley Goulbourne; Alex Petit; Sohang Guzman
- Producers: CashMoneyAP; DeCicco Beats

Ski Mask the Slump God singles chronology
"What in XXXTarnation" (2017)	"BabyWipe" (2017)	"Take a Step Back" (2017)

Music video
- "BabyWipe" on YouTube

"BabyWipe" is a song by American rapper Ski Mask the Slump God, released through SoundCloud on April 22, 2017. It was released to streaming services on April 28, 2017, as the lead single from his second mixtape You Will Regret (2017). The song was produced by CashMoneyAP.

== Music video ==
A music video was directed by Cole Bennett was released on September 11, 2017. Featuring psychedelic animation, it finds Ski Mask in strange scenarios that "blend 90's late night television aesthetic and sci-fi all together". They include him appearing as an astral projection, playfully rocking his head back and forth, and his face becoming distorted. In one clip, he is also in pajamas in bed while smoking.

== Certifications ==
Region	Certification	Certified units/sales
New Zealand (RMNZ)	Gold	15,000^{‡}
United States (RIAA)	Platinum	1,000,000^{‡}
^{‡} Sales+streaming figures based on certification alone.
