= Faucet Failure =

Single by Ski Mask the Slump God

from the album Stokeley
- Released: April 9, 2019
- Genre: Trap; hyphy
- Length: 2:25
- Label: Victor Victor; Republic
- Songwriters: Stokeley Clevon Goulbourne; Chase Rose; Kevin Gomringer; Tim Gomringer
- Producers: ChaseTheMoney; Cubeatz

Ski Mask the Slump God singles chronology
"Ghost Busters" (2018)	"Faucet Failure" (2019)	"Costa Rica" (2019)

Music video
- "Faucet Failure" on YouTube

"Faucet Failure" is a single by American rapper Ski Mask the Slump God from his 2018 album Stokeley, released as the only single on April 9, 2019. Prior to being released as a single, a music video was released for the track in February 2019. Later in March, it respectively peaked at numbers 87 and 55 on the US Billboard Hot 100 and the Canadian Hot 100.

== Music video ==
A music video directed by Cole Bennett was released for the song on February 26, 2019. It was called "eccentric, offbeat, and cartoonish" by XXL, as well as "psychedelic" by HotNewHipHop, and features Ski Mask the Slump God punching an elderly man in a durag, and an appearance from an ostrich.

== Charts ==
=== Weekly charts ===
Chart (2018–2019)	Peak position
Canada Hot 100 (Billboard)	55
New Zealand Hot Singles (RMNZ)	12
US Billboard Hot 100	87
US Hot R&B/Hip-Hop Songs (Billboard)	35

=== Year-end charts ===
Chart (2019)	Position
US Hot R&B/Hip-Hop Songs (Billboard)	79

== Certifications ==
Region	Certification	Certified units/sales
Denmark (IFPI Danmark)	Gold	45,000^{‡}
New Zealand (RMNZ)	2× Platinum	60,000^{‡}
United Kingdom (BPI)	Silver	200,000^{‡}
United States (RIAA)	2× Platinum	2,000,000^{‡}
^{‡} Sales+streaming figures based on certification alone.
