= Rap Devil =

2018 diss track by mgk

Single by Machine Gun Kelly

from the EP Binge
- Released: September 3, 2018
- Genre: Hip hop; trap
- Length: 4:46
- Label: Bad Boy; Interscope
- Songwriters: Colson Baker; Ronald Spence Jr.
- Producers: Ronny J; Nils

Machine Gun Kelly singles chronology
"Too Good to Be True" (2018)	"Rap Devil" (2018)	"Lately" (2018)

Music video
- "Rap Devil" on YouTube

"Rap Devil" is a diss track performed by American rapper Machine Gun Kelly. It is aimed at rapper Eminem. The song was produced by Ronny J and Nils. It was released on September 3, 2018, by Bad Boy Records and Interscope Records as a single from Kelly's second extended play, Binge. The song's title is a play on Eminem's "Rap God", and is his response to Eminem's song "Not Alike".

"Rap Devil" peaked at number 13 on the Billboard Hot 100 singles chart in the United States; "Killshot" was Eminem's response.

== Background and release ==
In 2012, Machine Gun Kelly tweeted about Eminem's daughter, Hailie Mathers: "Ok, so I just saw a picture of Eminem's daughter... and I have to say, she is hot as fuck, in the most respectful way possible cuz Em is king". At the time, Hailie was 16 years old and MGK was 22 years old. In an interview in 2015, MGK said about the tweet: "Pictures of [Hailie] had came out, and I'm like, what, 20 years old, 21 at the time? I said 'She's beautiful, but all respect due. Eminem is king. What's wrong with that? Is there a 15-year age gap where I'm a creep for that? I was 21, dawg. Certain people took it, and ran with it and hyped it up." In a 2018 interview, Machine Gun Kelly said he did not know how old Hailie was and had reacted after seeing a headline about her saying she was all grown up. Machine Gun Kelly claims that years ago, while he did not speak to Eminem directly, he did speak with Eminem's manager and agreed to delete the tweet.

Eminem then banned him from going to Shade 45, a radio station owned by Eminem. MGK also collaborated on a song with Tech N9ne and allegedly sent subliminal insults towards Eminem. On August 31, 2018, Eminem released a surprise album, Kamikaze, on which he insulted several artists in multiple diss tracks, including the song "Not Alike", where he insulted MGK specifically.

== Response ==
Speaking about "Rap Devil" in a YouTube interview with Sway Calloway, Eminem stated "it's not bad for him". Eminem then released a response diss track, "Killshot", on September 14, 2018. The official audio track on YouTube has over 499 million views as of August 2025.

== Music video ==
A music video for the song was released on WorldStarHipHop's YouTube channel and website on September 3, 2018.

== Personnel ==
Credits adapted from Tidal.

- Machine Gun Kelly – composition, vocals, recording, engineering
- Ronny J – composition, production
- Nils – composition, production
- Steve "Rock Star" Dickey – mixing
- Tony Dawsey – mastering

== Charts ==
Chart (2018)	Peak position
Australia (ARIA)	45
Canada Hot 100 (Billboard)	9
Ireland (IRMA)	11
New Zealand (Recorded Music NZ)	24
Scottish Singles Sales (Official Charts)	21
Sweden (Sverigetopplistan)	82
UK Singles (Official Charts)	15
UK Hip Hop/R&B (Official Charts)	9
US Billboard Hot 100	13
US Hot R&B/Hip-Hop Songs (Billboard)	10
US Hot Rap Songs (Billboard)	9

== Certifications ==
Region	Certification	Certified units/sales
New Zealand (RMNZ)	Platinum	30,000^{‡}
United Kingdom (BPI)	Silver	200,000^{‡}
United States (RIAA)	Platinum	1,000,000^{‡}
^{‡} Sales+streaming figures based on certification alone.

== Release history ==
Country	Date	Format	Label	Ref.
Various	September 3, 2018	Streaming (YouTube)	Bad Boy; Interscope	
Various	September 8, 2018	Digital download	Bad Boy; Interscope	

== See also ==
- List of notable diss tracks
