= Catch Me Outside =

Single by Ski Mask the Slump God

Single by Ski Mask the Slump God

from the album You Will Regret
- Released: June 13, 2017
- Genre: Hip-hop
- Length: 2:25
- Label: Victor Victor; Republic
- Songwriters: Stokeley Goulbourne; Melissa Elliott; Timothy Mosley
- Producer: Timbaland

Ski Mask the Slump God singles chronology
"Take a Step Back" (2017)	"Catch Me Outside" (2017)	"Achoo" (2017)

Music video
- "Catch Me Outside" on YouTube

"Catch Me Outside" is a song by American rapper Ski Mask the Slump God, released on June 13, 2017, as the third single from his second mixtape You Will Regret (2017). The song is a freestyle over "She's a Bitch" by Missy Elliott, produced by Timbaland. A sequel to the song, "Catch Me Outside 2", was released in 2025.

== Composition ==
In the song, Ski Mask the Slump God performs a freestyle rap over the instrumental of "She's a Bitch", while "filling every nook and cranny with his stacked rhymes" and making pop cultural references. Mitch Findlay of HotNewHipHop described the song as showing a more playful side of Ski Mask.

== Music video ==
The official music video, directed by Cole Bennett, was released on July 27, 2017. It sees Ski Mask the Slump God walking through Times Square, drinking lean and sticking his head out through a window of a car. Psychedelic animation is featured throughout the video, representing Ski Mask's hallucinations. A doll resembling Chucky from Child's Play appears in the video, seen sitting in the center of Times Square and traveling with Ski.

== Reception ==
Missy Elliott responded positively to the song, writing on Twitter, "Oh he rode the heck out of this Fiyah[!]"

== Certifications ==
Region	Certification	Certified units/sales
New Zealand (RMNZ)	Platinum	30,000^{‡}
United Kingdom (BPI)	Silver	200,000^{‡}
United States (RIAA)	Platinum	1,000,000^{‡}
^{‡} Sales+streaming figures based on certification alone.
