= Binge (EP) =

EP by Machine Gun Kelly

EP by Machine Gun Kelly
- Released: September 21, 2018
- Recorded: 2018
- Genre: Trap
- Length: 24:28
- Label: Bad Boy; Interscope
- Producer: BazeXX; Honorable C.N.O.T.E.; Hit-Boy; JP Did This 1; Nils; Ronny J; SlimXX; Negro Noodle; Stefan Gordy

Machine Gun Kelly chronology
Bloom (2017)	Binge (2018)	Hotel Diablo (2019)

Singles from Binge
- 1. "Loco" Released: August 2, 2018; 2. "Rap Devil" Released: September 3, 2018; 3. "Lately" Released: September 21, 2018

Binge (stylized in all caps) is the second extended play by American rapper Machine Gun Kelly. It was released on September 21, 2018 under Bad Boy Records and Interscope Records. The EP includes a sole guest appearance from 24hrs, along with the single "Rap Devil", a diss track directed at Eminem.

== Critical reception ==
Professional ratings
Review scores
Source	Rating
AllMusic	4/5 stars
HipHopDX	3.2/5
NME	2/5 stars
Sputnikmusic	1.5/5 stars

Binge received generally negative reviews, with critics citing lack of lyrical content, unique sound, and the artist's dependence on his feud with Eminem as reasons for low ratings. As a result, the EP has only one star on the U.S iTunes store.

== Commercial performance ==
In the United States, the EP debuted at number 24 on the Billboard 200, with first-week sales of 21,519 copies. It dropped to number 111 on the Billboard 200 in its second week selling 14,000 copies, and fell off completely in its third week.

== Track listing ==
Credits adapted from Tidal.

Binge
No.	Title	Writer(s)	Producer(s)	Length
1.	"Long Time Coming"	Colson Baker; Brandon Allen; Stephen Basil; Martez Little	SlimXX; BazeXX	1:02
2.	"Loco"	Baker; Allen; Basil	SlimXX; BazeXX	2:37
3.	"GTS"	Baker; Allen; Basil	SlimXX; BazeXX; Stefan Gordy	2:22
4.	"Rap Devil"	Baker; Ronald Spence Jr.	Ronny J; Nils	4:41
5.	"Nylon"	Baker; Allen; Basil; Earl Johnson	JP Did This 1; BazeXX	1:48
6.	"Lately"	Baker; Spence Jr.; Allen	Ronny J; SlimXX	3:15
7.	"Signs" (featuring 24hrs)	Baker; Chauncey Hollis Jr.; Robert Davis III	Hit-Boy	2:46
8.	"Get the Broom"	Baker; Carlton Mays Jr.; Stefan Gordy	C.N.O.T.E.; Negro Noodle	2:32
9.	"Live Fast Die Young"	Baker; Allen; Basil	SlimXX; BazeXX	3:14
Total length:				24:28

Notes

- All track titles are stylized in all caps.

== Charts ==
Chart (2018)	Peak position
Australian Albums (ARIA)	62
Belgian Albums (Ultratop Flanders)	98
Canadian Albums (Billboard)	17
Dutch Albums (Album Top 100)	117
Finnish Albums (Suomen virallinen lista)	47
New Zealand Albums (RMNZ)	39
US Billboard 200	24
US Top R&B/Hip-Hop Albums (Billboard)	16
