= What in XXXTarnation =

Single by XXXTentacion featuring Ski Mask the Slump God

Single by XXXTentacion featuring Ski Mask the Slump God

from the album Members Only, Vol. 3
- Released: April 20, 2017
- Recorded: 2017
- Genre: Satirical hip hop
- Length: 2:44
- Label: Bad Vibes Forever; Empire
- Songwriters: Jahseh Onfroy; Stokeley Goulbourne; STAIN
- Producer: STAIN

XXXTentacion singles chronology
| "Look at Me!" (2017) | "What in XXXTarnation" (2017) | "Gospel" / "Take a Step Back" (2017) |

Ski Mask the Slump God singles chronology
| "Life Is Short" (2016) | "What in XXXTarnation" (2017) | "BabyWipe" (2017) |

"What in XXXTarnation" (sometimes stylized as "WHAT IN XXXTARNATION!?") is a song by American rapper and singer XXXTentacion featuring fellow American rapper Ski Mask the Slump God. The song was released as a single for the Members Only mixtape Members Only, Vol. 3. It was produced by STAIN.

== Background ==
"What in XXXTarnation" was first released on XXXTentacion's SoundCloud account on April 17, 2017, along with three other songs and was released as a single on April 20, 2017. Throughout the song, X and Ski Mask the Slump God make satirical threats towards their enemies. The song was described as the "rap version of a fart joke" on an XXL article listing their top XXXTentacion songs. In 2019, Ski Mask himself sampled the song in his single "Carbonated Water".

== Artists ==
Credits adapted from Genius.

- XXXTentacion – primary artist, songwriter
- Ski Mask the Slump God – featured artist, songwriter
- STAIN – producer, songwriter
