= Jahphet Landis =

Panamanian musician (born 1984)

Jahphet Negast Landis (born 1984), known professionally as Roofeeo, is a Panamanian Drummer, DJ, and Music Producer. He is known for his participation in the Art Punk band The Death Set. Landis has a longstanding association with TV On The Radio, playing drums for the band after the death of bassist Gerard Smith and drummer Jaleel Bunton's move to Bass & Keys. He has also recorded/ played drums for Björk, Kanye West, Santigold, Spank Rock, Amanda Blank, Ninjasonik, and Theophilus London.

Landis was born in Panama on June 13, 1984. He moved to Brooklyn, New York at a young age where he learned to play drums in a local church. In 2008 Landis began DJing.

== Discography ==
- 2016: "Yours Truly, Austin Post" (Post Malone; Stoney)
- 2019: "Floor Seats" (A$AP Ferg; Floor Seats)
