= Members Only, Vol. 3 =

XXXTentacion Presents: Members Only, Vol. 3

Mixtape by Members Only
- Released: June 26, 2017
- Recorded: 2017
- Genres: Hip hop; experimental hip hop; emo rap; trap metal
- Length: 59:45
- Label: Empire
- Producers: AdamOnTheTrack; Alex Freedo; Bass Santana; Benjilluminati; Blvck Amethyst; Byou$; Cris Dinero; Diablo; Frank Dukes; HighAF; GetRichard; Khaed; Michael Piroli; Natra Average; P. Soul; Purpdogg; Rovin Hosh; Stain

Members Only chronology
Members Only, Vol. 2 (2015)	XXXTentacion Presents: Members Only, Vol. 3 (2017)	Members Only, Vol. 4 (2019)

XXXTentacion chronology
Revenge (2017)	Members Only, Vol. 3 (2017)	17 (2017)

Singles from Members Only, Vol. 3
- 1. "What in XXXTarnation" Released: April 20, 2017

Members Only, Vol. 3, also referred to by its full title XXXTentacion Presents: Members Only, Vol. 3 on streaming services, is the third and final mixtape by American hip hop group Members Only. It was released via SoundCloud on June 26, 2017. It is also the final Members Only project to be released during XXXTentacion's lifetime.

== Track listing ==
Members Only, Vol. 3
No.	Title	Writer(s)	Producer(s)	Length
1.	"Find Me (Intro)" (performed by XXXTentacion)	Jahseh Onfroy	GetRichard	2:56
2.	"Off the Wall!" (performed by XXXTentacion & Ski Mask the Slump God)	Onfroy; Stokeley Clevon Goulbourne; Dontarian Hollis	Michael Piroli; BYOU$	3:23
3.	"What in XXXTarnation" (performed by XXXTentacion & Ski Mask the Slump God)	Onfroy; Goulbourne	Stain	2:44
4.	"Wassup Bro" (performed by Craig Xen)	Craig Gordwin	HighAF; Diablo	2:17
5.	"H2O" (performed by Ski Mask the Slump God & XXXTentacion)	Onfroy; Goulbourne	Khaed	2:19
6.	"Butthole Girl" (performed by XXXTentacion, Tankhead, Robb Bank$ & Craig Xen)	Onfroy; TankHead; Richard O'Neil Burrell; Gordwin	Natra Average	3:03
7.	"Static Shock" (performed by XXXTentacion & Ski Mask the Slump God)	Onfroy; Goulbourne	Stain	1:29
8.	"Came2Kill" (performed by Kid Trunks, XXXTentacion & Craig Xen)	Onfroy; Minh Nguyen; Gordwin	Cris Dinero	1:49
9.	"Boost" (performed by XXXTentacion)	Onfroy	Stain	1:17
10.	"Chokehold" (performed by Cooliecut)		Stain; Rovin Hosh	1:25
11.	"4Peat" (performed by Robb Bank$ & Ski Mask the Slump God)	Burrell; Goulbourne	Cris Dinero	2:42
12.	"Maxipads for Everyone" (performed by XXXTentacion)	Onfroy	Stain	1:49
13.	"Slipknot" (performed by XXXTentacion, Kin$oul & Killstation)	Onfroy; Nolan Santana; Kin$oul	P. Soul	3:29
14.	"777" (performed by Kid Trunks & XXXTentacion)	Onfroy; Nguyen	Frank Dukes	3:00
15.	"Supra" (performed by Kin$oul & XXXTentacion)	Onfroy; Kin$oul	Benji Armstrong; Alex Freedo	3:56
16.	"GodDamn" (performed by Bass Santana & Kin$oul)	Bass Santana; Kin$oul	Bass Santana	2:19
17.	"Vulture" (performed by Flyboy Tarantino & Kin$oul)	Flyboy Tarantino; Kin$oul	Blvck Amethyst	3:10
18.	"Curse" (performed by Bass Santana, XXXTentacion, Cooliecut & Kin$oul)	Onfroy; Santana; Cooliecut; Kin$oul	Bass Santana	1:58
19.	"Members Only Shit" (performed by Kin$oul, Killstation & ikabodVEINS)	Kin$oul; Santana; Ikabod Veins	Bass Santana	2:38
20.	"On That Bitch" (performed by Kid Trunks, Craig Xen, Robb Bank$ & Kin$oul)	Nguyen; Burrell; Kin$oul	AdamOnTheTrack	3:30
21.	"Lol" (performed by Bass Santana, Kid Trunks & Flyboy Tarantino)	Santana; Nguyen; Tarantino	Bass Santana	3:20
22.	"Invisible Klip" (performed by Kid Trunks, Robb Bank$ & Ski Mask the Slump God)	Nguyen; Burrell; Goulbourne	Cris Dinero	2:05
23.	"Bowser" (performed by Ski Mask the Slump God & XXXTentacion)	Onfroy; Goulbourne	Purp Dogg	3:07

== Charts ==
Chart (2018)	Peak position
Belgian Albums (Ultratop Flanders)	96
Belgian Albums (Ultratop Wallonia)	156
Dutch Albums (Album Top 100)	127
