= Stokeley =

Studio album by Ski Mask the Slump God
- Released: November 30, 2018
- Recorded: 2018
- Length: 32:18
- Label: Victor Victor; Republic
- Producer: A. Lau; Binnz; ChaseTheMoney; Cubeatz; Deko; Elijah Rawk; Fresh ThPharmacy; G Koop; Kenny Beats; MadisonLST; Murda Beatz; OG Parker; Rico on the Keys; Ronny J; Roofeeo; RubiRosa; Sool Got Hits; Tee Romano; Tony Seltzer; Tupon; WondaGurl

Ski Mask the Slump God chronology
Beware the Book of Eli (2018)	Stokeley (2018)	Sin City The Mixtape (2021)

Singles from Stokeley
- 1. "Faucet Failure" Released: April 9, 2019

Professional ratings
Review scores
Source	Rating
AllMusic	4/5 stars
NME	4/5 stars
Pitchfork	7.2/10

Stokeley (stylized in all caps) is the debut studio album by American rapper Ski Mask the Slump God. It was released on November 30, 2018, by Victor Victor Worldwide and Republic Records. The album features guest appearances from Juice Wrld, Austin Lam, Lil Baby and Lil Yachty.

== Commercial performance ==
In the United States, Stokeley debuted at number 6 on the US Billboard 200 chart, earning 51,000 album-equivalent units, with 5,000 coming from pure album sales in its first week.

== Track listing ==
Credits adapted from Tidal.

No.	Title	Writer(s)	Producer(s)	Length
1.	"So High"	Stokeley Goulbourne; Adrian Lau; Antonio Hernandez; Elijah Rawk	A. Lau; Tony Seltzer; Rawk	2:29
2.	"Nuketown" (featuring Juice Wrld)	Goulbourne; Eric Wall; Jarad Higgins	Fresh ThPharmacy	2:46
3.	"Foot Fungus"	Goulbourne; Kenneth Blume III; Jahphet Landis; Calvin Broadus; Chad Hugo; Pharrell Williams	Kenny Beats; Roofeeo	2:09
4.	"La La"	Goulbourne; Ronald Spence, Jr.; Edwin Morina; Eric Mullegger	Ronny J; Tupun^{[a]}; Rico on the Keys^{[a]}	2:27
5.	"Unbothered"	Goulbourne; Blume	Kenny Beats	2:18
6.	"Save Me, Pt. 2" (featuring Austin Lam)	Goulbourne; Austin Carlisle; Wall; Melvin Bass	Fresh ThPharmacy	3:08
7.	"Adults Swim"	Goulbourne; Chase Rose	ChaseTheMoney	1:46
8.	"Far Gone" (featuring Lil Baby)	Goulbourne; Shane Lindstrom; Rasool Diaz; Dominique Jones	Murda Beatz; Sool Got Hits^{[a]}	3:56
9.	"Get Geeked"	Goulbourne; Ebony Oshunrinde; Robert Mandell; Brendon Binns	WondaGurl; Binnz^{[a]}; G Koop^{[a]}	1:45
10.	"Reborn to Rebel"	Goulbourne; Lau; Hernandez; Madison Stewart	A. Lau; Tony Seltzer; MadisonLST	2:31
11.	"Faucet Failure"	Goulbourne; Rose; Kevin Gomringer; Tim Gomringer	ChaseTheMoney; Cubeatz^{[a]}	2:25
12.	"U and I"	Goulbourne; Lau; Luis Bello	A. Lau; RubiRosa	1:52
13.	"Cat Piss" (featuring Lil Yachty)	Goulbourne; Grant Decouto; Joshua Parker; Terence Williams; Miles McCollum	OG Parker; Deko; Tee Romano	2:46
Total length:				32:18

Notes

- ^{^[a]} signifies a co-producer
- "Save Me, Pt. 2" features additional vocals from Samaria
- "La La" is stylized in all caps

Sample credits

- "Foot Fungus" contains an interpolation of "Drop It Like It's Hot", performed by Snoop Dogg and Pharrell.

== Personnel ==
Credits adapted from Tidal.

- Adrian Lau – recording (tracks 1, 5, 10, 12)
- Fresh ThPharmacy – recording (tracks 2–4, 6–8, 11, 13)
- Leighton "LG" Griffith – recording (track 9)
- Alex Tumay – mixing (tracks 1–7, 9–13)
- Thomas "Tillie" Mann – mixing (track 8)
- Joe LaPorta – mastering (all tracks)

== Charts ==
=== Weekly charts ===
Chart (2018)	Peak position
Australian Albums (ARIA)	35
Belgian Albums (Ultratop Flanders)	57
Belgian Albums (Ultratop Wallonia)	182
Canadian Albums (Billboard)	11
Danish Albums (Hitlisten)	22
Dutch Albums (Album Top 100)	27
Estonian Albums (IFPI)	12
Finnish Albums (Suomen virallinen lista)	25
Irish Albums (IRMA)	38
Latvian Albums (LAIPA)	8
New Zealand Albums (RMNZ)	24
Norwegian Albums (VG-lista)	13
Swedish Albums (Sverigetopplistan)	24
Swiss Albums (Schweizer Hitparade)	75
UK Albums (OCC)	64
US Billboard 200	6
US Top R&B/Hip-Hop Albums (Billboard)	4

=== Year-end charts ===
Chart (2019)	Position
Icelandic Albums (Plötutíóindi)	77
US Billboard 200	122
US Top R&B/Hip-Hop Albums (Billboard)	55

== Certifications ==
Region	Certification	Certified units/sales
Denmark (IFPI Danmark)	Gold	10,000^{‡}
United Kingdom (BPI)	Silver	200,000^{‡}
United States (RIAA)	Platinum	1,000,000^{‡}
^{‡} Sales+streaming figures based on certification alone.
