= Kid Buu (rapper) =

American rapper (born 1988)

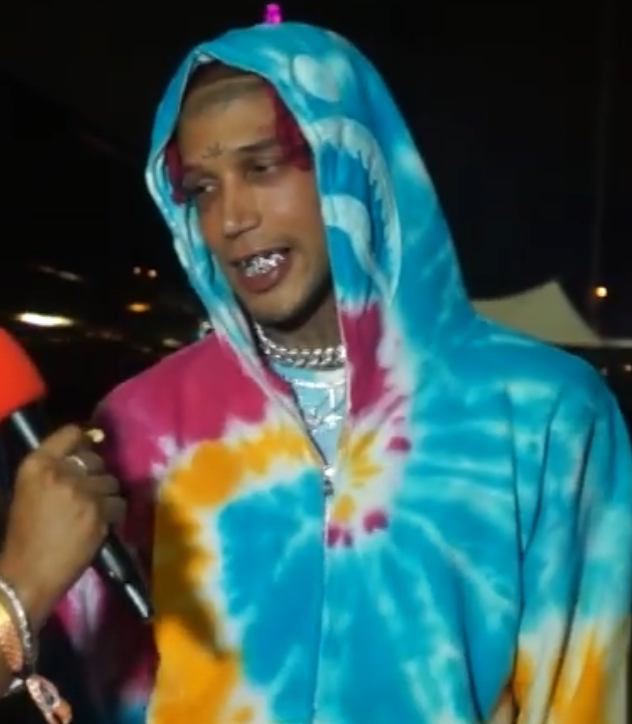
- Kid Buu in 2019

Background information
- Also known as: Humongous The God, HXTXG
- Born: Markquez Lao Santiago; April 11, 1988 (age 38); Jersey City, New Jersey, U.S.
- Genres: Hip hop; emo rap; cloud rap; trap; mumble rap; dembow
- Occupations: Singer, rapper
- Years active: 2009–present

Markquez Lao Santiago (born April 11, 1988), known professionally as Kid Buu, is an American rapper and singer based in South Miami, Florida. His career has been marked by his attempts to generate controversy as well as his run-ins with the law.

== Early life and career ==
Markquez Santiago was born on April 11, 1988, at St. Elizabeth Child Care Center in Jersey City, New Jersey. He later moved with his brother, Jason, and his mother to South Florida, specifically the Hialeah and Opa-locka areas, in search of a better life. He is of Sicilian and Puerto Rican descent.

In early 2018, Santiago changed his stage name from "Humongous The God" to "Kid Buu", in reference to Dragon Ball Z character Majin Buu.

== Personal life ==
In 2019, Santiago was convicted on charges of child abuse following a domestic dispute with then girlfriend Blac Chyna.

Santiago is a Raëlian, and claims that he is a clone.

== Discography ==
=== Studio albums ===
List of albums, with selected details
Title	Studio album details
Revenge of the Clones	Released: November 8, 2019; Label: Island Records; Format: CD, digital download, streaming

=== Mixtapes ===
List of mixtapes, with selected details
Title	Mixtape details
Man vs God	Released: August 6, 2011; Label: Self-released; Format: Digital download, streaming
Man vs God 2: Agape	Released: March 7, 2014; Label: Self-released; Format: Digital download, streaming
Man vs God 3: HXTXG	Released: September 11, 2014; Label: Self-released; Format: CD, digital download, streaming
In Gwalla We Trust	Released: February 3, 2016; Label: Global Gwalla Gang Records; Format: Digital download, streaming
Gwalla 16	Released: December 25, 2016; Label: Global Gwalla Gang Records; Format: Digital download, streaming
Kaneda	Released: April 13, 2017; Label: Global Gwalla Gang Records; Format: Digital download, streaming
Blind For Love (with Oohdem Beatz)	Released: February 13, 2018; Label: Self-released; Format: CD, digital download, streaming
Blind For Love 3	Released: January 24, 2020; Label: Island Records; Format: CD, digital download, streaming
What the Game's Been Missing	Released: March 3, 2021; Label: Valentine Enterprise; Format: Digital download, streaming
Blind for Love 4: A Perfect Love Letter	Released: January 22, 2022; Label: Valentine Enterprise; Format: CD, digital download, streaming
Pink Plan3t	Released: June 2, 2023; Label: Valentine Enterprise; Format: CD, digital download, streaming
Pink Plan3t 2.0	Released: December 23, 2023; Label: Self-released; Format: Digital download, streaming

=== Extended plays ===
List of EPs, with selected details
Title	EP details
Blind For Love 2	Released: February 14, 2019; Label: Island Records; Format: CD, digital download, streaming
