= Ski Mask the Slump God =

American rapper (born 1996)

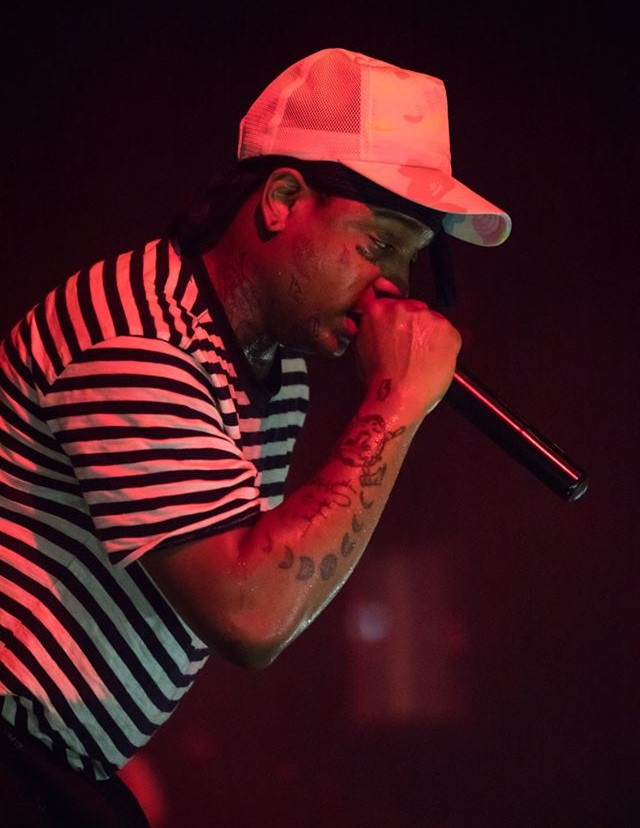
- Ski Mask the Slump God in 2018

Background information
- Also known as: Ski; Ski Mask
- Born: Stokeley Clevon Goulbourne; April 18, 1996 (age 30); Fort Lauderdale, Florida, U.S.
- Origin: Broward County, Florida, U.S.
- Genres: Experimental hip-hop; trap; punk rap; meme rap; SoundCloud rap
- Occupations: Rapper; songwriter
- Works: Ski Mask the Slump God discography
- Years active: 2014–present
- Labels: Victor Victor; Republic; Empire; Very Rare & Co
- Member of: Members Only
- Website: skimasktheslumpgod.net

Stokeley Clevon Goulbourne (born April 18, 1996), known professionally as Ski Mask the Slump God, is an American rapper. He is best known for his association with XXXTentacion, with whom he formed the hip hop collective Members Only in 2014. He is notable for his nostalgic-themed musical production and public image, often clad with multi-colored durags. He signed with Victor Victor Worldwide, an imprint of Republic Records to release his debut commercial mixtape You Will Regret (2017), which entered the Billboard 200 and spawned the platinum-certified singles "BabyWipe", "Take a Step Back" (featuring XXXTentacion), and "Catch Me Outside".

Goulbourne's third mixtape, Beware the Book of Eli (2018), peaked at number 50 on the Billboard 200. His debut studio album, Stokeley (2018), peaked at number six on the chart and spawned the Billboard Hot 100-charting songs "Faucet Failure", "Nuketown" (featuring Juice Wrld), and "Foot Fungus".

== Early life ==
Stokeley Clevon Goulbourne was born on April 18, 1996, in Fort Lauderdale, Florida. He is of Jamaican descent. He grew up listening to Busta Rhymes, Missy Elliott, Wu-Tang Clan, and Lil Wayne, among other artists. He has said that his parents often played Jamaican music around the house. Goulbourne's father—a rapper who used the stage name "Sin City"—would often force his son to focus on writing his own rap music. In 2013, Goulbourne was sent to a juvenile detention center for possession of "around $10 worth of weed", where he met XXXTentacion. The duo became friends and frequently collaborated on songs after being released from detention.

== Career ==
=== 2014–2017: Mainstream debut ===
Following Goulbourne's release from detention, he formed the rap group "Very Rare" with XXXTentacion and released his first song "Catch Me" on the streaming service SoundCloud. Goulbourne eventually co-founded XXXTentacion's collective Members Only after the release of Members Only Vol. 1, a collaboration mixtape with XXXTentacion, in 2015. The mixtape would eventually be followed up with Members Only, Vol. 2 and then Members Only, Vol. 3 on June 26, 2017.

Goulbourne released multiple singles on the SoundCloud platform including "Catch Me Outside", "Where's the Blow" featuring Lil Pump, "Stunt!" featuring UnoTheActivist, "Life Is Short", "Like a Soccer Mom", "Take a Step Back", and "BabyWipe". Goulbourne has performed twice at the Rolling Loud Festival and has released songs with other artists including Offset, Lil Yachty, A$AP Ferg, Lil Peep, Desiigner, and Denzel Curry. Goulbourne has also collaborated with artists from the 88Rising label including the Higher Brothers and Keith Ape. Goulbourne also worked with Timbaland, who he had previously said was his favorite producer.

In May 2016, Goulbourne released his first mixtape Drown in Designer, which included the songs "Take a Step Back", which was later certified Gold, and "Where's the Blow". In June 2017, Goulbourne released his debut commercial mixtape You Will Regret under Victor Victor Worldwide and Republic Records.

=== 2018–2024: Beware the Book of Eli, Stokeley, Sin City The Mixtape, and 11th Dimension ===
In May 2018, Goulbourne released his third mixtape Beware the Book of Eli, which featured the single "DoIHaveTheSause?". In June that same year, he was named one of XXL's "2018 Freshman Class". On November 30, 2018, Goulbourne released his debut studio album, Stokeley, which includes the songs "Faucet Failure" and "Nuketown" featuring Juice Wrld. The album peaked at number 6 on the Billboard 200 chart.

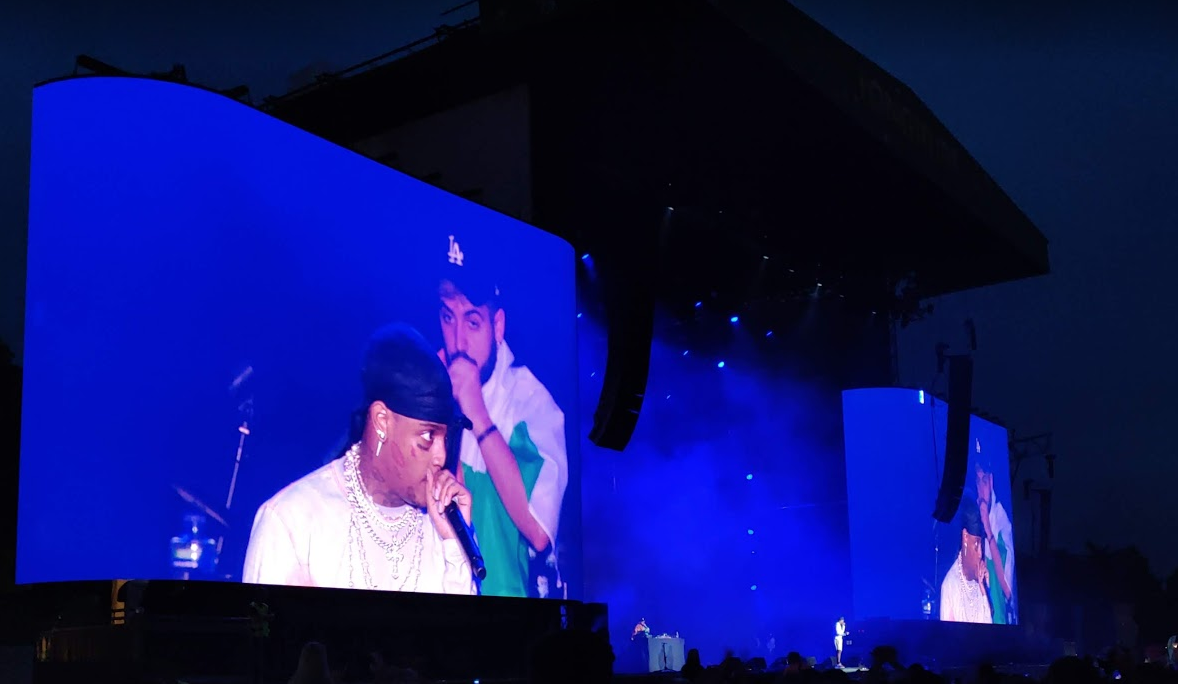
Ski Mask the Slump God on the Longitude 2019 Main Stage

Following the success of Stokeley, Goulbourne released only one single in 2019, "Carbonated Water". In July 2020, he released the single "Burn the Hoods" alongside a music video on Lyrical Lemonade. Simultaneously, he announced that his second album would release later that year, however the album was never released. Goulbourne has stated that he plans to release more music to the public.

In May 2021, Goulbourne announced a mixtape titled Sin City The Mixtape to be released in June. He released Sin City The Mixtape on June 25.

On November 21, 2023, Goulbourne announced his second studio album, 11th Dimension, and said that it is "coming so soon". On March 15, 2024, Goulbourne released the first single for his upcoming album, "Shibuya". On May 10, 2024, the second single was released, "Headrush". On June 7, 2024, Goulbourne released his second studio album, 11th Dimension. The project is supported by features from ATL Jacob, Future, XXXTentacion, Juice Wrld, Skilibeng & Corbin.

=== 2025–present: The Lost Files, Blood Sport ===
In early 2025, Goulbourne signed a deal with Empire Distribution. On July 4, 2025, Goulbourne released a new single "Catch Me Outside 2" under Victor Victor and Empire. The single was released alongside a music video directed by frequent collaborator, Cole Bennett.

On July 30, 2025, Goulbourne released The Lost Files, his first compilation album consisting of older SoundCloud tracks that were previously unavailable on streaming services. The album was released under his new label, Very Rare & Co, and Empire. The compilation is supported by 3 singles with XXXTentacion: "Fatality", "Broly", and "IWatchedHimDrown".

On April 3, 2026, Goulbourne released the single "BreakTheRules!" from his upcoming third studio album.

== Influences ==
Goulbourne has said that his musical production has been most influenced by Busta Rhymes, Missy Elliott, and Chief Keef. He has also stated he does not have any main musical influences; "I listen to every genre: rap, rock, classical, heavy metal...I listen to Adele sometimes too".

== Personal life ==
As of June 2018, Golbourne lives in Atlanta, Georgia. He had a heart condition that required surgery in March 2018.

=== Friendships ===
==== XXXTentacion ====
Goulbourne was close friends with XXXTentacion before they both started rapping. They met in a juvenile center in 2013. Goulbourne said in an interview with Adam22 that he was surprised by X's criminal charges. Whilst in jail, X had taught Goulbourne about different rapping cadences. After the duo were released, they met up with the intention of committing home invasions but instead began releasing music together. The rappers founded the collective Members Only. In 2017, Goulbourne and XXXTentacion embarked on The Revenge Tour with Craig Xen. The tour was postponed following the shooting of XXXTentacion's cousin. By late 2017, the two had parted ways and begun working on their own projects.

At the Rolling Loud Miami festival in 2018, Goulbourne and XXXTentacion were reunited, reaffirming their friendship. On June 18, 2018, XXXTentacion was murdered; Goulbourne learned of his best friend's death while on Instagram Live and tearfully informed his fans of the rapper's death.

==== Juice Wrld ====
In early 2018, Goulbourne befriended rising rapper Juice Wrld. The two went on to collaborate on the track "Nuketown", which became Goulbourne's highest-charting song on the Billboard Hot 100. It was announced that the two were working on a mixtape titled Evil Twins, but the project never released. In 2019, following the release of Juice Wrld's second album, the two embarked on the Death Race for Love Tour together along with Cole Bennett of Lyrical Lemonade.

On December 8, 2019, Juice Wrld died from a drug overdose. Goulbourne reacted emotionally to the news of the rapper's death. Goulbourne was present at Juice Wrld's funeral later that month.

==== Aftermath ====
The death of his two best friends in a span of eighteen months had a profound impact on Goulbourne. Following XXXTentacion's death, Goulbourne honored him multiple times during his own concerts; Goulbourne met XXXTentacion's son, Gekyume Onfroy, for the first time in person at a show. After Juice WRLD's untimely death, Goulbourne continued to honor Juice WRLD and XXXTentacion at Rolling Loud and other shows, including performing at three of four tribute events called Juice Wrld Day, which took place at United Center in Chicago.

== Discography ==
Studio albums

- Stokeley (2018)
- 11th Dimension (2024)

Collaborative albums

- Members Only, Vol. 4 (2019) (as part of Members Only)

== Filmography ==
Year	Title	Role	Notes	Ref.
2018	The After Party	Himself	Cameo	
2021	Juice Wrld: Into the Abyss	Himself	Documentary	
2022	Look at Me	Himself	Documentary	
2026	Rolling Loud: The Movie	Himself		
