= Ronny J =

American record producer

- Also known as: Ronny J Listen Up; Oh My God Ronny; OMGRonny
- Born: Ronald Oneil Spence Jr. September 14, 1992 (age 33); Camden, New Jersey, U.S.
- Origin: Woodbury, New Jersey, U.S.
- Genres: Hip hop; trap
- Occupations: Record producer; rapper; singer; songwriter
- Years active: 2011–present
- Labels: Indie-Pop; Atlantic

Ronald Oneil Spence Jr., professionally known as Ronny J (formerly stylized as RONNYJLI$TENUP), is an American record producer and rapper. Since the mid-2010s, he has been credited with production work for several music industry artists, including Kanye West, Eminem, Denzel Curry, XXXTentacion, Token, Smokepurpp, Lil Pump, Bhad Bhabie, Juice Wrld, Sfera Ebbasta, 6ix9ine, Ski Mask the Slump God, Machine Gun Kelly, and Iggy Azalea.

== Early life ==
Ronald Oneil Spence Jr. grew up in Woodbury, New Jersey, where he used to play drums in nursery, which got him interested in music. Ronny attended Rowan College at Gloucester County while still living in New Jersey where he met fellow Rose boy Corte$4Prez. He was also into arts and architecture before pursuing his music career. He moved to Miami, where he became part of Denzel Curry's group, C9 and Raider Klan.

== Career ==
In May 2017, Ronny J signed a deal with Independently Popular and Atlantic Records. On February 23, 2018, he released his first mixtape under Atlantic, OMGRonny. On August 14, 2020, he released his debut studio album, Jupiter.

Ronny J released the single "Emoji" on September 14, 2023; it is a collaboration with XXXTentacion released over five years after his death. The song was included on Ronny J's second album, Charged Up. It is a remake of a song originally released in 2016. Ronny J later stated on Instagram that "Emoji" is his last song with X.

== Production discography ==
=== Charted singles ===
Title	Year	Peak chart positions							Album
Title	Year	US	US R&B/HH	AUS	CAN	IRE	NZ	UK	Album
"Hi Bich" (Bhad Bhabie)	2017	68	29	—	66	—	—	—	15
"Kream" (Iggy Azalea featuring Tyga)	2018	96	—	—	54	96	—	—	Survive the Summer
"Bebe" (6ix9ine featuring Anuel AA)	2018	30	—	—	25	81	—	67	Dummy Boy
"The Ringer" (Eminem)	2018	8	7	5	5	6	2	4	Kamikaze
"Not Alike" (Eminem featuring Royce da 5'9")	2018	24	17	23	18	—	20	—	Kamikaze
"Rap Devil" (Machine Gun Kelly)	2018	13	10	45	9	11	24	15	Binge
"I Love It" (Lil Pump and Kanye West)	2018	6	5	4	1	2	1	3	Harverd Dropout
"Everything We Need" (Kanye West featuring Ty Dolla Sign and Ant Clemons)	2019	33	17	26	30	—	27	—	Jesus Is King
"Hurricane" (Kanye West and the Weeknd featuring Lil Baby)	2021	6	1	4	4	7	3	7	Donda

== Discography ==
=== Studio albums ===
- Jupiter (2020)
- Charged Up (2023)

=== Mixtapes ===
- OMGRONNY (2018)

=== Collaborative mixtapes ===
- No Name (with Lil Pump) (2021)

=== EPs ===
- Thank You, Ronny J (2016)
- RJ Please Turn Me Up (2019)

=== Collaborative EPs ===
- No Rest (2015) (with Yoshi Thompkins)
- iLoveMakonnen x Ronny J (2018) (with iLoveMakonnen)

=== Singles ===
- Bandz On Me (2013)
- Slave to My Wave (2014)
- Right Now (2014)
- Vigorous (2015)
- Crunch Time (2015)
- Ego (2015)
- Level Up (2016)
- Never Let Up (2016)
- Rep - Interlude (2016)
- Life is Changing (2016)
- Arrogant (2016)
- A Lot (2016) (featuring Mike Zombie)
- Gucci Ghost (2017)
- Wanna (2017)
- Boomerang (2017) (with Don Krez)
- Kilo (2017) (featuring Smokepurpp & Lil Pump)
- Una Noche Mas (2017)
- Monkey Nuts (2017) (with Danny Towers)
- Thriller (Forever) (2017) (featuring Ski Mask the Slump God)
- In The Flesh (2017)
- In LA (2018) (featuring MadeinTYO)
- Trixxx (2018) (featuring Lil Pump)
- Banded Up (2018) (featuring XXXTentacion)
- WOTR (2018)
- Doesn't Matter (2018)
- Ven y Cae (2018)
- Dime (2019)
- Star (2019)
- Gucci Lips (2019)
- Lights Out (2019) (featuring Ty Dolla Sign and Rich the Kid)
- Stack It Up (2019) (featuring Lil Pump)
- Goteo (Remix) (2020) (with Duki, Pablo Chill-E, C.R.O and Capo Plaza)
- It's Whatever (2020) (with Smokepurpp)
- Pop Shit (2020) (with Smokepurpp)
- Miami (2020) (with Sfera Ebbasta and Duki)
- Typical (2020)
- Rewind (2020)
- Million Dollar Mullet (2020) (with Riff Raff & Yelawolf)
- Pieces (2021)
- ChiCha (2021) (featuring Lary Over, Lil Tati and Eladio Carrion)
- Racks To The Ceiling (2021) (with Lil Pump featuring Tory Lanez)
- HunnaRound (2022) (with Xhluooo)
- Pour It Up (2022)
- Another One (2022) (with Wiz Khalifa)
- Taliban (2022)
- Breeze (2022)
- Sink or Swim (2022) (featuring Snow Banks)
- Everyday Valentine's Day (2023)
- Tik Tok (2023)
- Skate 3 (2023) (with tana)
- Millions Up (2023)
- Pa la Historiy (2023) (as J Ronny)
- Biscayne (2023)
- Danger (2023)
- Emoji (2023) (with XXXTentacion)
- Magic (2023) (with Wiz Khalifa)
- Nada Es Como Antes (2023) (with Ovi and StrangeHuman)
- Urus Music (2024)
- Fall in Love (2024)
- 67-02 (2024)
- Carta de Despedida (2024) (with Lit Killah and Milo J)
- Hotel Freestyle (2024)
- Roma (2024) (with Brray)
- Feeling Awesome (2024)
