= Niki discography =

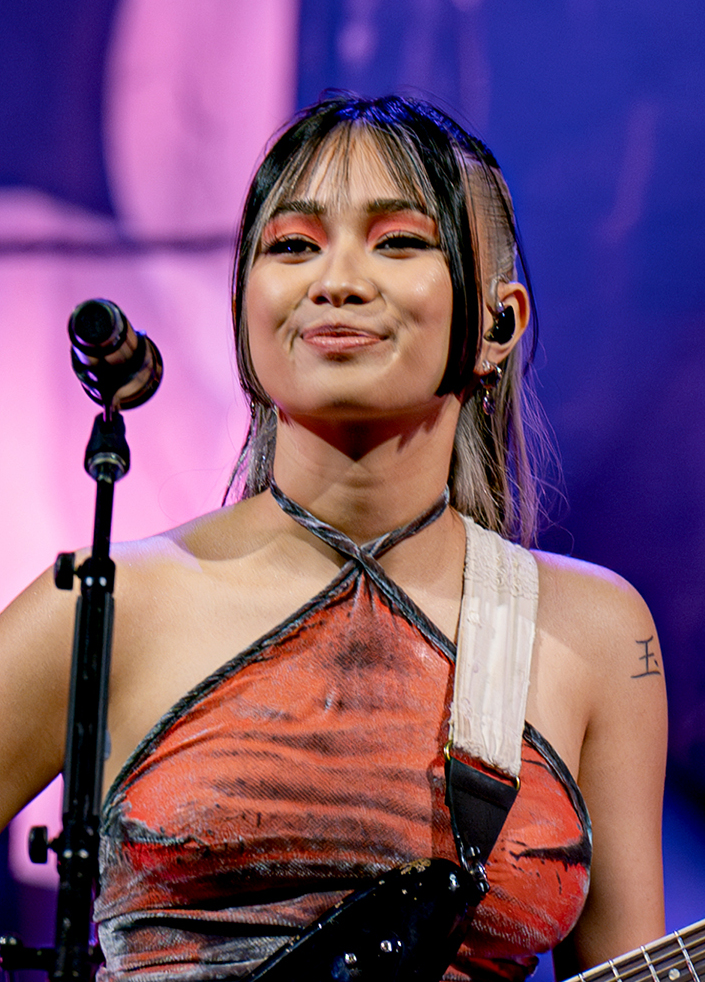
- Niki in 2024
- Studio albums: 3
- EPs: 2
- Live albums: 2
- Singles: 29

The discography of Indonesian recording artist Niki consists of three studio albums, two extended plays, and two live albums. Her debut studio album, Moonchild, was released in September 2020. Her singles "Every Summertime" and "High School in Jakarta" reached the top ten in Indonesia and Malaysia.

== Studio albums ==
List of studio albums, with release date and label shown
Title	Album details	Peak chart positions		
Title	Album details	UK Indie	UK Sales	US Curr.
Moonchild	Released: September 10, 2020; Label: 88rising, 12Tone; Formats: Digital download, streaming	—	—	—
Nicole	Released: August 12, 2022; Label: 88rising; Formats: Digital download, streaming, CD, vinyl, cassette	—	—	64
Buzz	Released: August 9, 2024; Label: 88rising; Formats: Digital download, streaming, CD, vinyl	19	77	—

== Extended plays ==
List of EPs, with release date and label shown
Title	Album details
Zephyr	Released: May 23, 2018; Label: 88rising, Empire; Formats: Digital download, streaming
Wanna Take This Downtown?	Released: May 17, 2019; Label: 88rising, 12Tone; Formats: Digital download, streaming

== Singles ==
List of singles, with year released and album name shown
Title	Year	Peak chart positions							Certifications	Album
Title	Year	IDN	MLY	NZ Hot	PHL	SGP	VIE	WW Excl. US	Certifications	Album
"Awali Hari Dengan Cinta"	2014	—	—	—	—	—	—	—		Non-album singles
"Polaroid Boy"	2016	—	—	—	—	—	—	—		Non-album singles
"Anaheim"	2017	—	—	—	—	—	—	—		Non-album singles
"See You Never"	2017	—	—	—	—	—	—	—		Non-album singles
"I Like U"	2017	—	—	—	—	—	—	—		Non-album singles
"Chilly"	2017	—	—	—	—	—	—	—		Non-album singles
"Newsflash!"	2018	—	—	—	—	—	—	—		Zephyr
"Say My Name"	2018	—	—	—	—	—	—	——		Zephyr
"Friends"	2018	—	—	—	—	—	—	—		Zephyr
"Spell"	2018	—	—	—	—	—	—	—		Zephyr
"Vintage"	2018	—	—	—	—	—	—	—		Zephyr
"Dancing with the Devil"	2018	—	—	—	—	—	—	—		Zephyr
"Warpaint"	2018	—	—	—	—	—	—	—		Head in the Clouds
"Lowkey"	2019	—	—	—	24	—	—	—		Wanna Take This Downtown?
"Indigo"	2019	—	—	—	—	—	—	—		Head in the Clouds II
"Shouldn't Couldn't Wouldn't"	2019	—	—	—	—	—	—	—		Head in the Clouds II
"La La Lost You"	2019	16	—	—	93	—	—	—		Head in the Clouds II
"Sugarplum Elegy"	2019	—	—	—	—	—	—	—		Non-album single
"Switchblade"	2020	—	—	—	—	—	—	—		Moonchild
"Selene"	2020	—	—	—	—	—	—	—		Moonchild
"Lose"	2020	—	—	—	—	—	—	—		Moonchild
"Hallway Weather"	2020	—	—	—	—	—	—	—		Non-album single
"Every Summertime"	2021	2	9	11	3	11	56	181	RIAA: Gold	Shang-Chi and the Legend of the Ten Rings: The Album
"Split"	2021	—	—	—	—	—	—	—		Non-album single
"Before"	2022	—	—	—	—	—	—	—		Nicole
"Oceans & Engines"	2022	14	—	—	33	— (Note: "Oceans & Engines" did not enter the RIAS Top Streaming Chart, but it peaked at number 28 on the RIAS Top Regional Chart.)	—	—		Nicole
"High School in Jakarta"	2022	2	6	—	—	28	—	—		Nicole
"Backburner"	2023	17	—	—	18	—	—	—		Nicole
"24"	2024	—	—	—	—	—	—N/a	—		Non-album single
"Too Much of a Good Thing"	2024	—	—	—	—	—	—N/a	—		Buzz
"Blue Moon"	2024	—	—	—	—	—	—N/a	—		Buzz
"Tsunami"	2024	—	—	—	98	—	—N/a	—		Buzz
"Buzz"	2024	—	—	—	—	—	—N/a	—		Buzz
"—" denotes releases that did not chart or were not released in that region.

== Other charted songs ==
Title	Year	Peak chart positions			Album
Title	Year	IDN Songs	PHL Songs	WW	Album
"The Apartment We Won't Share"	2022	—	94	—	Nicole
"Autumn"	2022	—	75	—	Nicole
"Take A Chance With Me"	2022	4	14	—	Nicole
"You'll Be in My Heart"	2022	1	2	107	Non-album single
"—" denotes releases that did not chart or were not released in that region.
