= Nicole World Tour =

2022–2023 concert tour by Niki

- Tour by Niki
- Promotional poster for the tour at the Eventim Apollo, London, England
- Location: North America; Asia; Australia; Europe
- Associated album: Nicole
- Start date: September 8, 2022
- End date: October 10, 2023
- No. of shows: 56

Niki concert chronology
- Nicole World Tour (2022–2023); Buzz World Tour (2024–2025)

The Nicole World Tour (also known as The Nicole Tour) was the debut headlining concert tour by Indonesian singer-songwriter Niki, launched in support of her second studio album, Nicole (2022).

The tour began on September 8, 2022, at the Malkin Bowl theater in Vancouver, Canada and concluded on October 10, 2023, at the Melkweg venue in Amsterdam, the Netherlands. The tour visited a total of 41 cities across North America, Asia, Australia, and Europe.

== Background ==
Niki planned to embark on a concert tour to promote her debut studio album, Moonchild (2020), which did not happen due to the COVID-19 pandemic. After performing in several music festivals and opening for other established musicians, Niki finally announced her first headlining tour in June 2022. The ticket went on sales on June 10, 2022.

== Critical responses ==
Chong Jinn Xiung from Tatler Asia named it one of "4 must-see concerts by Asian musicians in 2023". Rona Amparo from The Philippine Star praised Niki for her "comforting voice" and for "demonstrat[ting] her musical prowess as she played the guitar and keyboard throughout the concert".

Janice Sim from Vogue Singapore described her fashion during the tour mirrored her "youthful exuberance and stripped-back approach in her music—with everyday pieces that could easily be wardrobe staples. Of course, when paired with the artist's soulful vocals and sweet charisma, Niki has done what she's been doing best—shining on stage."

== Commercial reception ==
According to Broadway World, many dates of the 2022 leg of the tour had sold-out in the first hour of the presales, leaving a few remaining tickets for the general onsale on June 10, 2022. Niki's concert at the JIExpo Hall, Jakarta, on September 26, 2023, sold out in seven minutes, prompting her to add the second show for the next day. Total attendance for the Jakarta shows were 16,000.

The show for Pasay (Metro Manila) sold out in minutes after being on sale. In anticipation of the concert, her Filipino fans held an event called the "Backburner Party" at the Ayala Malls Manila Bay in Parañaque on September 10, 2023, featuring an impersonator of the singer similar to Taylor Sheesh.

The Kuala Lumpur show, with a total of 2,500 seats, sold out in under an hour.

== Set list ==
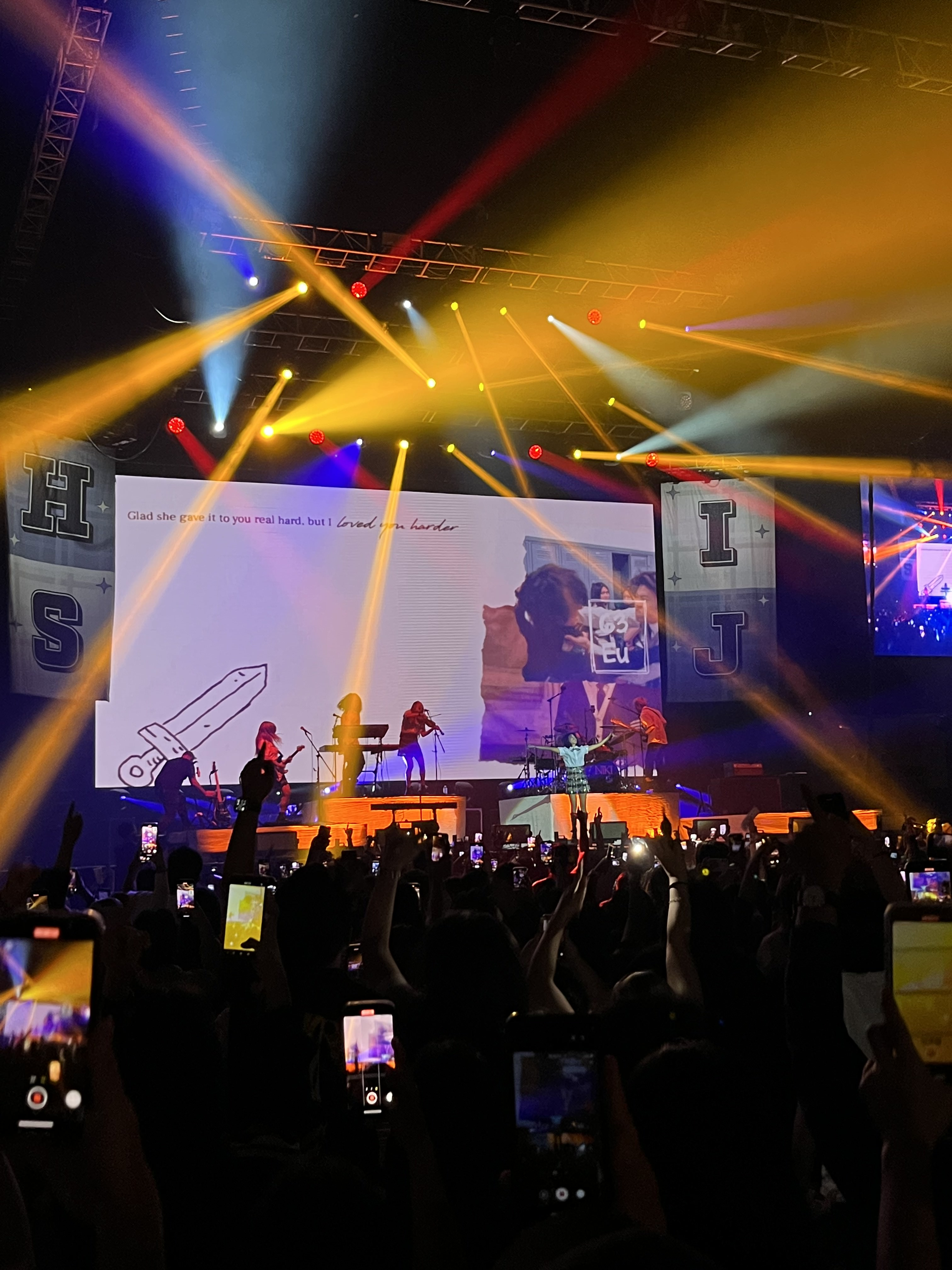
Niki performing "High School in Jakarta" at the SM Mall of Asia Arena, Pasay

The following set list is obtained from the September 13, 2023, concert in Pasay. It is not intended to represent all dates throughout the tour.

1. "Before"
2. "Keeping Tabs"
3. "Vintage"
4. "Selene"
5. "urs"
6. "Autumn"
7. "Backburner"
8. "Anaheim"
9. "Take a Chance with Me"
10. "The Apartment We Won't Share"
11. "Around"
12. "Lose"
13. "Facebook Friends"
14. "La La Lost You"
15. "Split"
16. "Oceans & Engines"

Encore

17. "High School in Jakarta"
18. "lowkey"
19. "Every Summertime"

=== Additional notes ===
- During her Jakarta shows on September 26 and 27, 2023, Niki performed a cover of "Laskar Pelangi" by Nidji after "Facebook Friends" and before "La La Lost You".

== Tour dates ==
List of 2022 concerts
Date	City	Country	Venue
September 8, 2022	Vancouver	Canada	Malkin Bowl
September 9, 2022	Seattle	United States	The Showbox
September 10, 2022	Portland	United States	Wonder Ballroom
September 13, 2022	Sacramento	United States	Ace of Spades
September 14, 2022	San Francisco	United States	Regency Ballroom
September 15, 2022	San Francisco	United States	Regency Ballroom
September 17, 2022	Santa Cruz	United States	The Catalyst
September 20, 2022	Minneapolis	United States	Varsity Theater
September 22, 2022	Toronto	Canada	Phoenix Concert Theatre
September 24, 2022	Toronto	Canada	Phoenix Concert Theatre
September 9, 2022	Detroit	United States	The Fillmore
September 27, 2022	New York City	United States	Webster Hall
September 28, 2022	New York City	United States	Webster Hall
September 30, 2022	Washington, D.C.	United States	Howard Theatre
October 1, 2022	Amherst	United States	Fine Arts Center Concert Hall
October 2, 2022	Boston	United States	Royale
October 4, 2022	Nashville	United States	Eastside Bowl
October 5, 2022	Charlotte	United States	The Underground
October 6, 2022	Atlanta	United States	Variety Playhouse
October 8, 2022	Dallas	United States	The Factory in Deep Ellum
October 9, 2022	Houston	United States	Warehouse Live
October 11, 2022	Chicago	United States	House of Blues
October 12, 2022	Chicago	United States	House of Blues
October 14, 2022	Denver	United States	Gothic Theatre
October 15, 2022	Salt Lake City	United States	The Complex
October 18, 2022	Phoenix	United States	The Van Buren
October 20, 2022	San Diego	United States	Epstein Family Amphitheater
October 22, 2022	Los Angeles	United States	The Wiltern
December 3, 2022	Jakarta	Indonesia	Community Park PIK 2 (Note: The shows on December 3–4, 2022 were part of the Head in the Clouds Festival.)
December 4, 2022	Jakarta	Indonesia	Community Park PIK 2
December 6, 2022	Singapore		Star Theater
December 8, 2022	Kuala Lumpur	Malaysia	Zepp Kuala Lumpur
December 9, 2022	Parañaque	Philippines	SM Festival Grounds (Note: The shows on December 9–10, 2022 were part of the Head in the Clouds Festival.)
December 10, 2022	Parañaque	Philippines	SM Festival Grounds
December 13, 2022	New Taipei City	Taiwan	Zepp New Taipei

List of 2023 concerts
Date	City	Country	Venue
May 13, 2023	Mexico City	Mexico	Autodromo Hermanos Rodriguez (Note: The show on May 13, 2023, was part of the Tecate Emblema Festival.)
May 21, 2023	New York City	United States	Forest Hills Stadium (Note: The show on May 21, 2023, was part of the Head in the Clouds Festival.)
August 1, 2023	Austin	United States	Moody Amphitheater
August 3, 2023	New York City	United States	The Rooftop at Pier 17
August 5, 2023	Chicago	United States	Grant Park (Note: The show on August 5, 2023, was part of the Lollapalooza festival.)
August 6, 2023	Los Angeles	United States	Brookside at the Rose Bowl (Note: The show on August 6, 2023, was part of the Head in the Clouds Festival.)
August 10, 2023	Vancouver	Canada	PNE Amphitheatre
August 12, 2023	San Francisco	United States	Golden Gate Park (Note: The show on August 12, 2023, was part of the Outside Lands festival.)
September 1, 2023	Honolulu	United States	Waikiki Shell
September 11, 2023	Bangkok	Thailand	BCC Hall
September 13, 2023	Pasay	Philippines	Mall of Asia Arena
September 15, 2023	Singapore		Padang Stage (Note: The show on September 15, 2023, was part of the 2023 Singapore Grand Prix.)
September 18, 2023	Brisbane	Australia	Fortitude Music Hall
September 21, 2023	Sydney	Australia	Hordern Pavilion
September 23, 2023	Melbourne	Australia	Festival Hall
September 26, 2023	Jakarta	Indonesia	JIExpo Hall
September 27, 2023	Jakarta	Indonesia	JIExpo Hall
October 1, 2023	Zhenjiang	China	Xinhu Park Plaza (Note: The show on October 1, 2023, was part of the Bubbling & Boiling Music and Arts Festival.)
October 6, 2023	London	England	Eventim Apollo
October 8, 2023	Paris	France	Le Trianon
October 10, 2023	Amsterdam	Netherlands	Melkweg
