= Fathia Izzati =

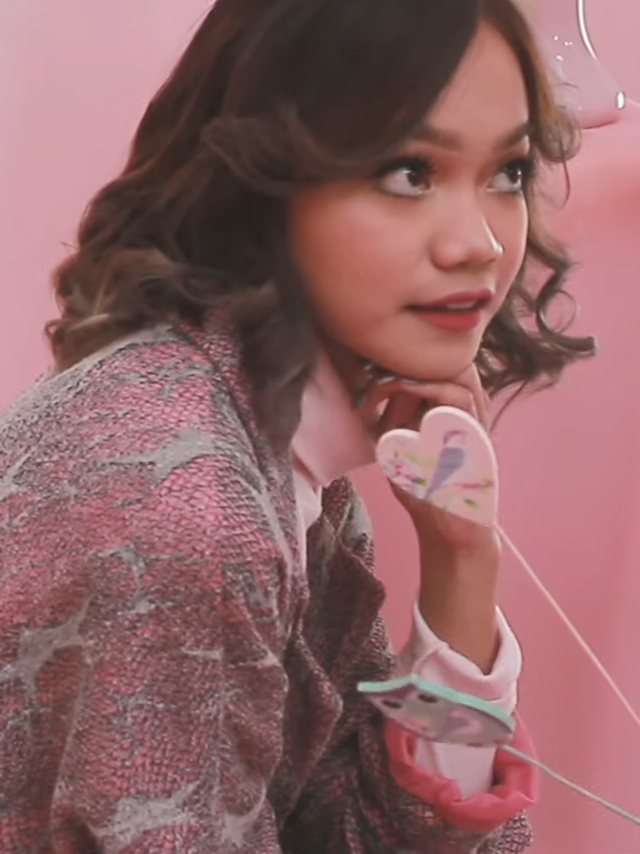
- Fathia at the GoGirl! photoshoot
- Born: Fathia Izzati Saripudin; 26 September 1994 (age 31); Jakarta, Indonesia
- Other name: Kittendust
- Education: University of Indonesia; SMA Negeri 82 Jakarta
- Occupations: YouTuber; singer; songwriter; actress
- Years active: 2011–now
- Spouse: Randa Trihatmaja (m. 2021)
- Family: Faiz Novascotia Saripudin (older brother)
- Musical career
- Genres: Alternative rock; indie pop
- Instruments: Vocals; keyboards; guitar; ukulele
- Labels: Independen; Lirico; Inpartmaint; Dominion
- Member of: Reality Club

YouTube information
- Channel: Fathia Izzati
- Genre: Vlog
- Subscribers: 680 thousand
- Views: 31 million
- Last updated: 10 September 2025

Fathia Izzati Saripudin (Arabic: فتحية عزتي شريف الدين or Fathiyyah ʿIzzatī Sharīf al-Dīn; born 26 September 1994) is an Indonesian YouTuber, singer, songwriter, and actress, best known for being the lead vocalist, keyboardist, and guitarist for the rock band Reality Club.

== Early life and education ==
Izzati was born in Jakarta on 26 September 1994 to Mohamad Hery Saripudin and Zulfanah. Her father works as a diplomat. She is the second of three siblings, with an older brother named Faiz Novascotia Saripudin and a younger sister named Farisha Aqilah Saripudin. She spent her childhood in various countries such as South Africa, Canada, and the United States due to her father’s career as a diplomat, who once served as the Consul General of Indonesia in Jeddah, Saudi Arabia. Izzati often spent 3–4 years abroad because of her father’s assignments.

While in Indonesia, Izzati pursued formal education at public schools. She studied at SMP Negeri 19 Jakarta and SMA Negeri 82 Jakarta. Izzati continued her studies at the Faculty of Law, University of Indonesia, and graduated in 2018. After graduating, she briefly worked at a law firm. However, she decided to resign from her job at a law firm.

== Career ==
Izzati started her YouTube channel on 30 May 2011. At the beginning of her career, the videos she uploaded were song covers, before she began creating other types of content. One of her most viewed videos on the platform is "21 Accents."

Izzati auditioned for the seventh season of Indonesian Idol at her school in 2012 and received a golden ticket.

Izzati is also the lead vocalist of Reality Club, which she co-founded with her brother and their friends.

In 2018, Izzati made her acting debut in a web series KZL.

== Personal life ==
On 8 August 2021, Izzati married Randa Trihatmaja at Tugu Kunstkring Paleis, Central Jakarta.. Their first child was born in 2022.

== Discography ==
=== Singles ===
- "Velvet" (with Kurosuke)
- "Misunderstood" (with Reza Oktovian)
- "Thinking About" (with Rebelsuns)
- "Hold You" (with JFlow dan JEIA)
- "Simfoni Rindu" (bersama Diskoria dan Joe Taslim)
- "LeleChester" (with Rifqy Pramudya dan Farhan)

== Filmography ==
=== Film ===
Year	Title	Role	Notes
2022	Piknik Pesona	Mutia	Segment: Gedang Renteng

=== Web series ===
Year	Title	Role	Notes
2018	KZL	Annisa	Debut Work

=== Podcast ===
- Census Nusantara (2022—now)

== Awards and nominations ==
=== With Reality Club ===
Year	Awards	Category	Nominated works	Results	Ref.
2018	Anugerah Musik Indonesia	Best Newcomer	"Is It The Answer?"	Nominated	
2018	Anugerah Musik Indonesia	Best Alternative Production Work	"Is It The Answer?"	Nominated	
2020	Anugerah Musik Indonesia	Best Pop Duo/Group/Vocal Group/Collaboration	"Telenovia"	Nominated	
2021	Anugerah Musik Indonesia	Best Pop Duo/Group/Vocal Group/Collaboration	"I Wish I Was Your Joke"	Nominated	
2023	Anugerah Musik Indonesia	Best Pop Duo/Group/Vocal Group/Alternative Collaboration	"Love Epiphany"	Won	
