= Reality Club (band) =

Indonesian indie rock band

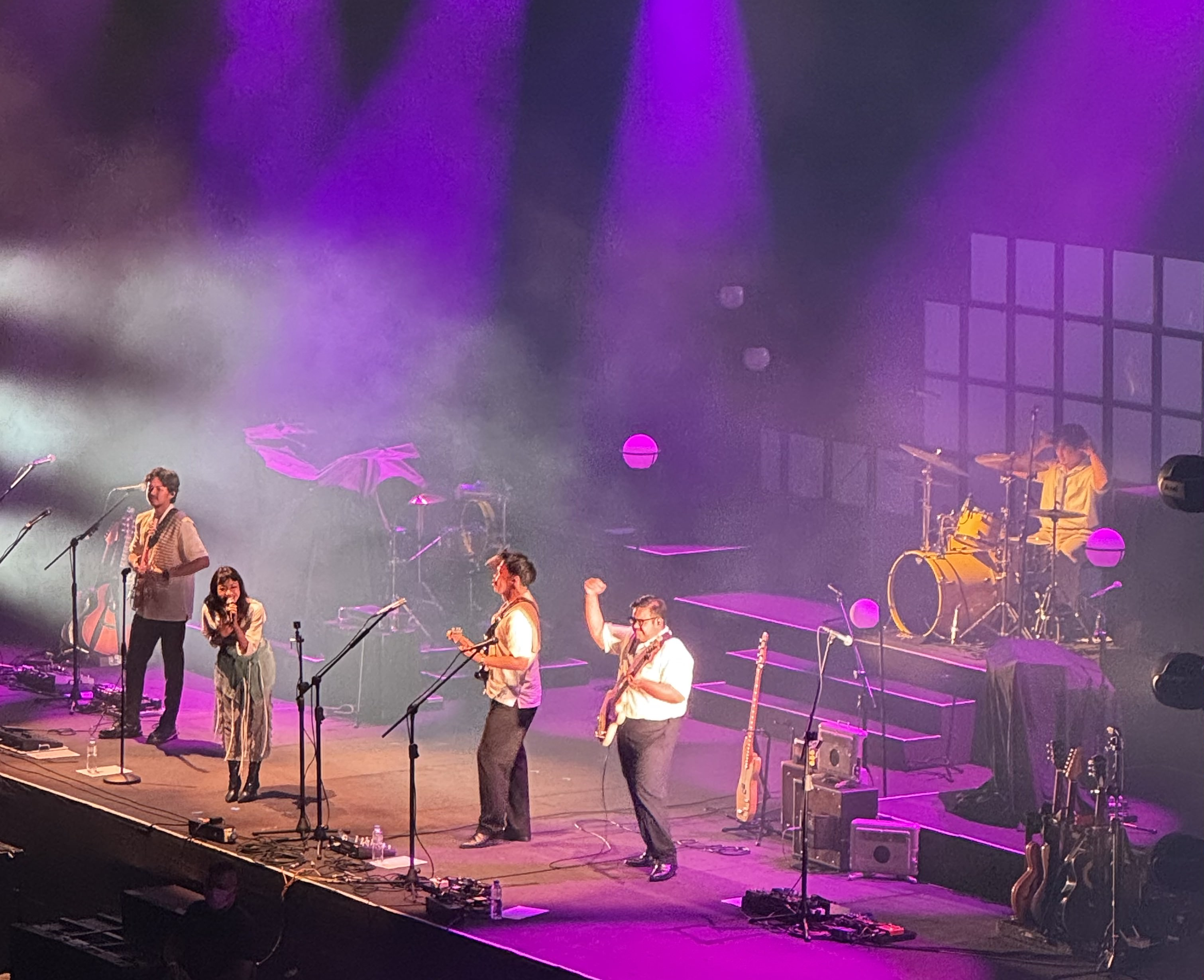
- Reality Club performing in Manila in 2025

Background information
- Origin: Jakarta, Indonesia
- Genre: Indie rock · Alternative rock · Indie pop
- Years active: 2016–present
- Labels: Dominion Records; Independent
- Members: Fathia Izzati; Nugi Wicaksono; Faiz Novascotia Saripudin; Era Patigo
- Past members: Iqbal Anggakusumah; Mayo Falmonti

Reality Club is an Indonesian indie rock band, formed in 2016, consisting of siblings Fathia Izzati and Faiz Novascotia Saripudin with Nugi Wicaksono and Era Patigo. They have released four studio albums, Never Get Better (2017), What Do You Really Know? (2019), Reality Club Presents... (2023), and Who Knows Where Life Will Take You? (2025).

== Career ==
The group was formed in 2016 by YouTuber Fathia Izzati, Era Patigo, and Mayo Falmonti as a cover band. Izzati then invited Iqbal Anggakusumah and her brother Faiz Novascotia Saripudin to join the band. Falmonti left the band after six months of formation due to personal commitments. He was then replaced by Nugi Wicaksono.

The group released their debut single "Is It The Answer?" in April 2016. It was then followed by "Things I Don't Know" in June and "Fatal Attraction" in July. 2 more singles were released in 2017, "Okay" in February and "Elastic Hearts" in July. Their debut studio album Never Get Better was released in August 2017. The group released an exclusive Japanese edition of Never Get Better in February 2019 with independent record label Inpartmaint Inc.

In June 2019, they released the lead single of then-upcoming sophomore album, "Telenovia". They released their sophomore studio album What Do You Really Know? in August 2019. The physical edition of the album was also released in Japan, Malaysia, and Singapore in 2020. In September 2020, the group released an extended play The Rush and Other Vices featuring "The Rush", a track from their second album with its extended version and a remix featuring Basboi, HNATA, Goonz, and Rino.

In February 2021, Reality Club signed a recording contract with Dominion Records, a sub-division of Universal Music Indonesia. In March 2021, they released a single "I Wish I Was Your Joke" with pop singer Bilal Indrajaya. They released single "Anything You Want" in April 2022. In November 2022, Anggakusumah left the group to focus on his solo career.

Their third studio album, Reality Club Presents…, was released in May 2023. In October 2023, the group kicked off their concert tour in Singapore, followed by five other cities around Asia. They won two Anugerah Musik Indonesia awards for Best Alternative Duo/Group/Collaboration for "Love Epiphany" and Best Alternative Album for Reality Club Presents… In March 2024, the group embarked on a North America tour. They were set to perform at the South by Southwest, but withdrew in protest of the festival's military and defense industry sponsorships amidst the Israeli genocide in Palestine. They opened for fellow Indonesian Niki on the Asian leg of her Buzz World Tour in February 2025. In April 2025, it was reported that Reality Club had joined Sun Eater as their management.

== Members ==
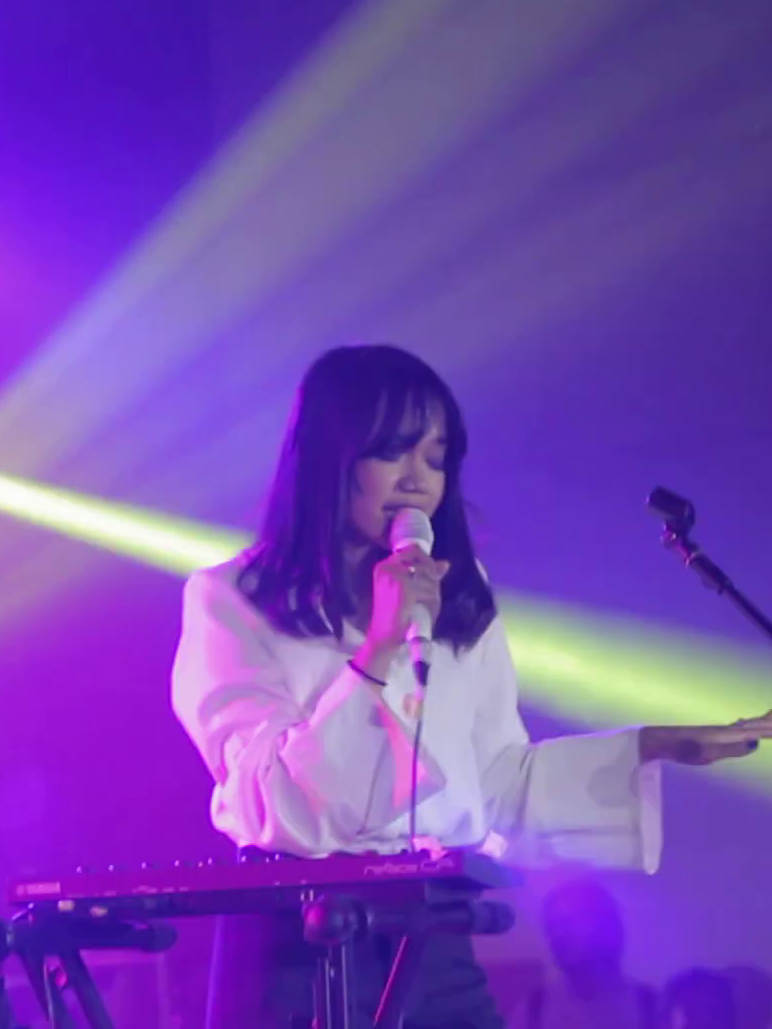
Izzati performing in 2019

Current members

- Fathia Izzati – vocals, keyboards (2016–present), guitar (2021—present)
- Faiz Novascotia Saripudin – vocals, guitar (2016–present)
- Nugi Wicaksono – bass guitar, backing vocals (2017–present)
- Era Patigo – drums (2016–present)

Past members

- Iqbal Anggakusumah – guitar (2016–2022)
- Mayo Falmonti – bass guitar (2016)

== Discography ==
=== Studio albums ===
Title	Details
Never Get Better	Released: 19 August 2017; Label: Independent
What Do You Really Know?	Released: 30 August 2019; Label: Independent
Reality Club Presents…	Released: 26 May 2023; Label: Dominion Records
Who Knows Where Life Will Take You?	Released: 27 August 2025; Label: Independent
I Don't Wanna Hate The World	Released: 31 October 2025; Label: Alarm Records
Close To You	Released: 19 February 2026; Label: Independent

=== Extended plays ===
Title	Details
The Rush and Other Vices	Released: 25 September 2020; Label: Independent

=== Live albums ===
Title	Details
Reality Club on Audiotree (Live)	Released: 21 June 2024; Label: Dominion Records
Reality Club Presents… The Show (Live At Balai Sarbini)	Released: 27 December 2024; Label: Dominion Records

=== Singles ===
Title	Year	Album
"Is It The Answer?"	2016	Never Get Better
"Things I Don't Know"	2016	Never Get Better
"Fatal Attraction"	2016	Never Get Better
"Okay"	2017	Never Get Better
"Elastic Hearts"	2017	Never Get Better
"Telenovia"	2019	What Do You Really Know?
"SSR"	2019	What Do You Really Know?
"Alexandra"	2019	What Do You Really Know?
"The Rush"	2020	What Do You Really Know?
"I Wish I Was Your Joke" (featuring Bilal Indrajaya)	2021	Reality Club Presents…
"You Let Her Go Again"	2021	Reality Club Presents…
"Tell Me I'm Wrong"	2021	Reality Club Presents…
"Anything You Want"	2022	Reality Club Presents…
"Dancing In The Breeze Alone"	2023	Reality Club Presents…
"Desire"	2023	Reality Club Presents…
"Love Epiphany"	2023	Reality Club Presents…
"Am I Bothering You?"	2023	Reality Club Presents…
"Sunny Days"	2024	Non-album singles
"Not Today"	2024	Non-album singles
"Quick! Love!"	2025	Who Knows Where Life Will Take You?
"You'll Find Lovers Like You and Me"	2025	Who Knows Where Life Will Take You?
"I Don't wanna hate The World"	2025	Non-album singles
"Close To you"	2026	Who Knows Where Life Will Take You
"Close To You/Jauh"	2026	Who Knows Where Life Will Take You
