= Buzz World Tour =

2024–2025 concert tour by Niki

- Tour by Niki
- Promotional poster for the 2024–2025 tour dates
- Location: North America; Europe; Asia; Oceania
- Associated album: Buzz
- Start date: September 5, 2024
- End date: March 15, 2025
- No. of shows: 42

Niki concert chronology
- Nicole World Tour (2022–2023); Buzz World Tour (2024–2025)

The Buzz World Tour (also known as Buzz Around the World Tour) was the second headlining concert tour by Indonesian singer-songwriter Niki, launched in support of her third studio album, Buzz (2024).

The tour began on September 5, 2024, at the Budweiser Stage in Toronto, Canada, and concluded on March 13, 2025, in Melbourne, Australia. The tour visited a total of 37 cities across North America, Asia, Australia, and Europe.

== Background ==
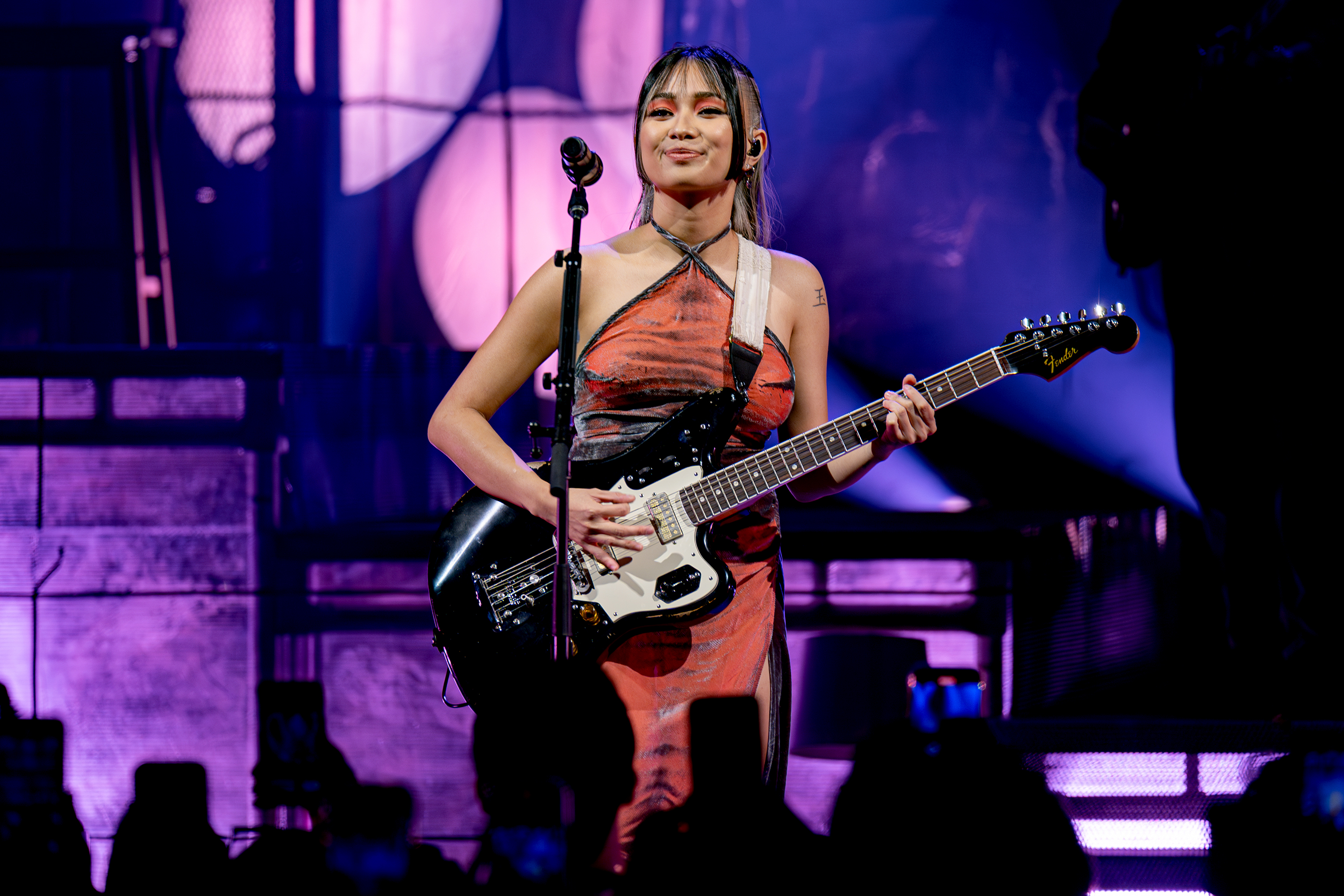
Niki performing at the Greek Theatre in Los Angeles, October 11, 2024

On May 2, 2024, Niki revealed her third studio album, Buzz, through her Instagram account. Two weeks later, on May 15, she announced her second world tour to accompany the album. This tour is her largest world tour to date, covering 42 markets across North America, Europe, Asia, and Australia.

Presale tickets for North America, Europe, and the UK were available starting May 15, 2024, with general sales beginning two days later. Presale tickets for Australia and New Zealand (the latter eventually got canceled) were available from November 21, 2024, with general sales beginning on November 26. Ticket sales for the Asian dates also began in November 2024. Supporting acts include August Ponthier and Amy Allen for North America and Europe. On January 22, 2025, she announced Reality Club and Sarah Kinsley as supporting acts for the Asia and Australian dates.

== Set list ==
The following set list is obtained from the February 11, 2025, concert in Pasay. It is not intended to represent all dates throughout the tour.

1. "Buzz"
2. "Keeping Tabs"
3. "Colossal Loss"
4. "Focus"
5. "urs"
6. "lowkey"
7. "Autumn"
8. "Did You Like Her in the Morning?" (acoustic)
9. "Take Care" (acoustic)
10. "La La Lost You" (acoustic)
11. "Blue Moon"
12. "Strong Girl"
13. "Tsunami"
14. "Oceans & Engines"
15. "Linger" (The Cranberries cover)
16. "The Apartment We Won't Share" / "Paths" (medley)
17. "Magnets"
18. "Heirloom Pain" (with a snippet of "Before")
19. "High School in Jakarta"
20. "Backburner" (with a snippet of "Take a Chance With Me")

== Tour dates ==
List of 2024 concerts
| Date (2024) | City | Country | Venue | Opening act |
|---|---|---|---|---|
| September 5 | Toronto | Canada | Budweiser Stage | August Ponthier |
| September 7 | Boston | United States | MGM Music Hall at Fenway | August Ponthier |
| September 8 | Washington, D.C. | United States | The Anthem | August Ponthier |
| September 12 | Philadelphia | United States | The Met | August Ponthier |
| September 13 (Note: The show on September 13, 2024, were part of the Capital One City Parks Foundation SummerStage.) | New York City | United States | Central Park | —N/a |
| September 16 | Charlotte | United States | Skyla Credit Union Amphitheatre | August Ponthier |
| September 17 | Cumberland (Note: Labeled as Atlanta in promotional material.) | United States | Coca-Cola Roxy | August Ponthier |
| September 19 | Houston | United States | 713 Music Hall | August Ponthier |
| September 20 | Austin | United States | Moody Theater | August Ponthier |
| September 21 | Irving (Note: Labeled as Dallas in promotional material.) | United States | Toyota Music Factory | August Ponthier |
| September 25 | Chicago | United States | Byline Bank Aragon Ballroom | August Ponthier |
| September 29 | Denver | United States | Fillmore Auditorium | August Ponthier |
| October 1 | Salt Lake City | United States | The Union Event Center | August Ponthier |
| October 3 | Berkeley | United States | Hearst Greek Theatre | August Ponthier |
| October 8 | Phoenix | United States | Arizona Financial Theatre | August Ponthier |
| October 10 | Paradise (Note: Labeled as Las Vegas in promotional material.) | United States | The Chelsea | August Ponthier |
| October 11 | Los Angeles | United States | Greek Theatre | August Ponthier |
| October 14 | San Diego | United States | Cal Coast Credit Union Open Air Theatre | August Ponthier |
| October 17 | Portland | United States | Theater of the Clouds | August Ponthier |
| October 18 | Seattle | United States | WaMu Theater | August Ponthier |
| October 19 | Vancouver | Canada | Rogers Arena | August Ponthier |
| October 27 | Brussels | Belgium | La Madeleine | Amy Allen |
| October 29 | Cologne | Germany | Palladium | Amy Allen |
| November 1 | Paris | France | Olympia | Amy Allen |
| November 2 | Tilburg (Note: Labeled as Rotterdam in promotional material.) | Netherlands | Poppodium 013 | Amy Allen |
| November 6 | Manchester | England | O2 Apollo Manchester | Amy Allen |
| November 7 | London | England | Wembley Arena | Amy Allen |
| November 10 | Dublin | Ireland | Olympia Theatre | Amy Allen |

List of 2025 concerts
| Date (2025) | City | Country | Venue | Opening act |
|---|---|---|---|---|
| February 9 | Hong Kong | | AsiaWorld–Expo Hall 5 & 7 | Reality Club |
| February 11 | Pasay (Note: Labeled as Manila in promotional material.) | Philippines | SM Mall of Asia Arena | Reality Club |
| February 12 | Pasay | Philippines | SM Mall of Asia Arena | Reality Club |
| February 14 | Jakarta | Indonesia | Beach City International Stadium | Reality Club |
| February 16 (Note: This show was originally scheduled for February 15, 2025, but was rescheduled due to scheduling conflict.) | Jakarta | Indonesia | Beach City International Stadium | Reality Club |
| February 18 | Singapore | | Singapore Indoor Stadium | Reality Club |
| February 20 | Taipei | Taiwan | Taipei International Convention Center | Reality Club |
| February 22 | Bangkok | Thailand | Central World Live, 8th Floor (Note: This show was originally scheduled to take place at Impact Exhibition Hall 5 in Pak Kret, but was changed to the 8th floor of Central World Live in Bangkok for undisclosed reasons.) | Reality Club |
| February 25 | Kuala Lumpur | Malaysia | Mega Star Arena | Reality Club |
| February 26 | Kuala Lumpur | Malaysia | Mega Star Arena | Reality Club |
| March 1 | Quezon City | Philippines | Araneta Coliseum | —N/a |
| March 5 | Fremantle (Note: Labeled as Perth in promotional material.) | Australia | Metropolis Fremantle (Note: This show was originally scheduled to take place at the Red Hill Auditorium in Perth, but was changed to Metropolis Fremantle for undisclosed reasons.) | Sarah Kinsley |
| March 9 | Sydney | Australia | Hordern Pavilion | Sarah Kinsley |
| March 13 | Melbourne | Australia | Sidney Myer Music Bowl | Sarah Kinsley |

=== Canceled shows ===
List of canceled concerts
| Date | City | Country | Venue | Reason | Ref. |
|---|---|---|---|---|---|
| September 27, 2024 | Minneapolis | United States | Minneapolis Armory | Low ticket sales | |
| March 7, 2025 | Moreton Bay (Note: Labeled as Brisbane in promotional material.) | Australia | Eatons Hill Hotel (Note: This show was originally scheduled to take place at Riverstage in Brisbane, but was changed to Eatons Hill Hotel in Moreton Bay for undisclosed reasons before ultimately getting canceled.) | Cyclone Alfred | |
| March 15, 2025 | Auckland | New Zealand | Venue never confirmed | Undisclosed | |
