= Take A Chance With Me =

2022 song by Niki

Song by Niki

from the album Nicole
- Released: August 12, 2022
- Genre: Alternative R&B; Indie pop
- Length: 5:03
- Label: 88rising
- Songwriter: Nicole Zefanya
- Producers: Niki; Reske; Jacob Ray

"Take A Chance With Me" is a song recorded by Indonesian singer-songwriter Niki. It was released as a digital single for her second album Nicole on August 12, 2022, through 88rising. Written by Nicole Zefanya and produced by Niki, Reske, and Jacob Ray, the alternative R&B and Indie pop track was designed for women who are willing to share their emotions with their loved ones. On the Billboard charts, it peaked at number four and number fourteen on Indonesia Songs and Philippines Songs respectively.

== Background and release ==
After the release of her debut album, Moonchild in 2020. She released her second album, Nicole in 2022, alongside her pre-singles, "Before", "Oceans & Engines", and "High School in Jakarta".

Her second album, Nicole, features reimagined archived songs from Niki's past, along with several new tracks. She revealed that during the pandemic, she delved into her archived YouTube videos from middle school and discovered that these songs hold a special place in her heart. Niki also shared that the collaborative process of creating songs in their collaborators' garages and living rooms was carefree and energizing, resembling a child at the playground. The record helped Niki trust his gut and gain confidence as a songwriter and producer, making it more fun and freeing.

== Composition ==
"Take A Chance With Me" is five minutes and three seconds long, composed in the key of A# with a time signature of 4/4, and has a tempo of 94 beats per minute. It was written by Nicole Zefanya and produced by Niki, Reske, and Jacob Ray. It is an alternative R&B and Indie pop track was designed for women who are willing to share their emotions with their loved ones. "Take A Chance With Me" is the final song on the album, offering a fresh start and a bittersweet homage to old 2000s songs, contrasting with the previous songs that closed the chapters of her past.

Niki described the song as her second original song posted on YouTube when she was fifteen, she also credits Reske and Jacob Ray for elevating the song above expectations, making it the album's finalé. Niki also expressed admiration for the song's lyrically innocent yet sonically sonorous nature, showcasing his years of experience as a producer. Niki also reflects on the beginning of her journey as a songwriter at fifteen, describing it as the beginning of her formative relationship and the inspiration for his coming-of-age album, which she believes is the most fitting title.

== Credits and personnel ==
Credits are adapted from Apple Music.

- Niki – vocals, songwriter, producer
- Reske – background vocals, mandolin, producer
- Jacob Ray – producer, recording engineer
- Cade Gotthardt – trumpet, horn
- Jonathan Albertelly – trumpet, horn
- Ivan Handwerk – assistant mixing engineer
- Katie Harvey – assistant mastering engineer
- Trevor Taylor – mixing engineer
- Dale Becker – mastering engineer
- Fili Filizzola – assistant mastering engineer
- Noah McCorkle – assistant mastering engineer
- Jeff Ellis – mixing engineer

== Charts ==
Chart performance for "Take A Chance With Me"
Chart (2025)	Peak position
Indonesia (Billboard)	4
Philippines (Billboard)	14
