= Buzz (Niki album) =

2024 studio album by Niki

Studio album by Niki
- Released: August 9, 2024
- Genre: Alternative pop; folk-pop
- Length: 43:48
- Label: 88rising
- Producer: Niki; Tyler Chester; Jacob Ray; James Krausse; Mark McKenna; Andy Seltzer

Niki chronology
Nicole (2022)	Buzz (2024)

Singles from Buzz
- 1. "Too Much of A Good Thing" Released: May 3, 2024; 2. "Blue Moon" Released: June 21, 2024; 3. "Tsunami" Released: July 26, 2024; 4. "Buzz" Released: August 9, 2024

Buzz is the third studio album by Indonesian singer-songwriter Niki. It was released on August 9, 2024, through 88rising. The album was preceded by four singles "Too Much of A Good Thing", "Blue Moon", "Tsunami", and "Buzz".

== Background ==
Niki released her second album, Nicole, on August 12, 2022, which became a commercial success. She later embarked on her first headlining solo world tour, the Nicole World Tour, from September 2022 to October 2023.

On January 12, 2024, just before her 25th birthday, she announced a new standalone single, "24." On May 2, 2024, Niki announced her third studio album, Buzz, via her Instagram account, along with the lead single, "Too Much of a Good Thing", which is set to be released on May 9, 2024. Two weeks later, on May 15, she announced her second world tour, Buzz World Tour, to accompany the album. This tour is her largest world tour to date, covering 44 markets across North America, Europe, Asia, and Australia.

The album consists of thirteen tracks, including three previously released singles, "Too Much of a Good Thing" on May 3, "Blue Moon" on June 21, and "Tsunami" on July 26. On August 9, 2024, a fourth and final single, "Buzz", was released alongside a music video on Niki's YouTube channel. The album's title is inspired by her love of gardening and the buzzing sound of bumblebees.

== Critical reception ==
Rhian Daly from NME stated, "Buzz is the most advanced its creator has ever sounded musically and lyrically—an album full of heady thrills and emotional lows that solidifies NIKI's place as one of music’s most incisive songwriters right now".

Bella Martin from DIY said that the album "Buzz is a delicately presented collection of quintessential singer-songwriter fare, with NIKI’s vocals shifting from a country twang to a whisper, echoing influences like Phoebe Bridgers and Elliott Smith".

== Track listing ==
Buzz track listing
No.	Title	Writer(s)	Producer(s)	Length
1.	"Buzz"	Nicole Zefanya; Jacob Ray; Mark McKenna	Niki; Ray; McKenna; Andy Seltzer	2:55
2.	"Too Much of A Good Thing"	Zefanya; Ethan Gruska	Niki; Gruska	2:52
3.	"Colossal Loss"	Zefanya; Ray	Niki; Ray; McKenna; Seltzer	3:39
4.	"Focus"	Zefanya	Niki	3:26
5.	"Did You Like Her In The Morning?"	Zefanya	Niki	3:37
6.	"Take Care"	Zefanya	Niki	2:33
7.	"Magnets"	Zefanya; Gruska	Niki; Gruska	3:37
8.	"Tsunami"	Zefanya	Niki; Seltzer; Reske^{[a]}	3:51
9.	"Blue Moon"	Zefanya	Niki; Gruska	3:46
10.	"Strong Girl"	Zefanya	Niki; Tyler Chester; James Krausse	3:35
11.	"Paths"	Zefanya	Niki; Gruska	3:10
12.	"Heirloom Pain"	Zefanya	Niki; Seltzer; Edison Lo^{[a]}	3:04
13.	"Nothing Can"	Zefanya; Ray	Niki; Ray; McKenna	3:43
Total length:				43:48

Notes

- ^{^[a]}indicates an additional producer

== Charts ==
Chart performance for Buzz
Chart (2024)	Peak position
UK Albums Sales (OCC)	77
UK Independent Albums (OCC)	19
US Heatseekers Albums (Billboard)	22
