= Zephyr (EP) =

2018 EP by Niki

EP by Niki
- Released: May 23, 2018
- Genre: R&B
- Length: 25:49
- Label: 88rising; Empire
- Producer: Niki; Scott Storch; August Grant; KC Knight

Niki chronology
Zephyr (2018)	Wanna Take This Downtown? (2019)

Singles from Zephyr
- 1. "Vintage" Released: May 16, 2018

Zephyr is the debut EP by Indonesian singer-songwriter Niki. It was released on May 23, 2018, through 88rising and Empire.

== Background ==
In 2017, Niki signed with the American record label 88rising. During her first year with the label, she released multiple standalone singles, including "See You Never," "I Like U," and "Chilly."

In May 2018, she released her debut EP, Zephyr, with the lead single, "Vintage", dropping a week earlier. In an interview with Media Group, she stated that the album was inspired by young people's love stories, as the theme is easier to grasp since it resonates with everyone. The EP consists of eight tracks, including the lead single, "Vintage". It also features four previously released standalone singles: "Newsflash!", "Say My Name", "Friends," and "Spell".

== Critical reception ==
Anna Qiang from CU Record stated, "All eight tracks in Zephyr play gracefully, akin to unwrapping a new treasure, one by one. Indeed, the number eight, symbolizing good fortune in Indonesian culture, holds its auspicious nature true through the magnificence of this album".

== Track listing ==
Zephyr track listing
No.	Title	Writer(s)	Producer(s)	Length
1.	"Newsflash!"	Nicole Zefanya	Niki	3:24
2.	"Say My Name"	Zefanya; Avedon; Ray Davon Jacobs; Conrad Sewell; Scott Storch	Storch	3:12
3.	"Friends"	Zefanya; Jacobs; Maurice Powell	August Grant	3:14
4.	"Spell"	Zefanya	Niki	3:47
5.	"Vintage"	Zefanya	Niki	2:57
6.	"Dancing with the Devil"	Zefanya; Kenneth Knight	Niki; KC Knight	2:42
7.	"Pools"	Zefanya	Niki	3:29
8.	"Around"	Zefanya	Niki	3:04
Total length:				25:49
