= Sarah Kinsley =

American singer-songwriter (born 2000)

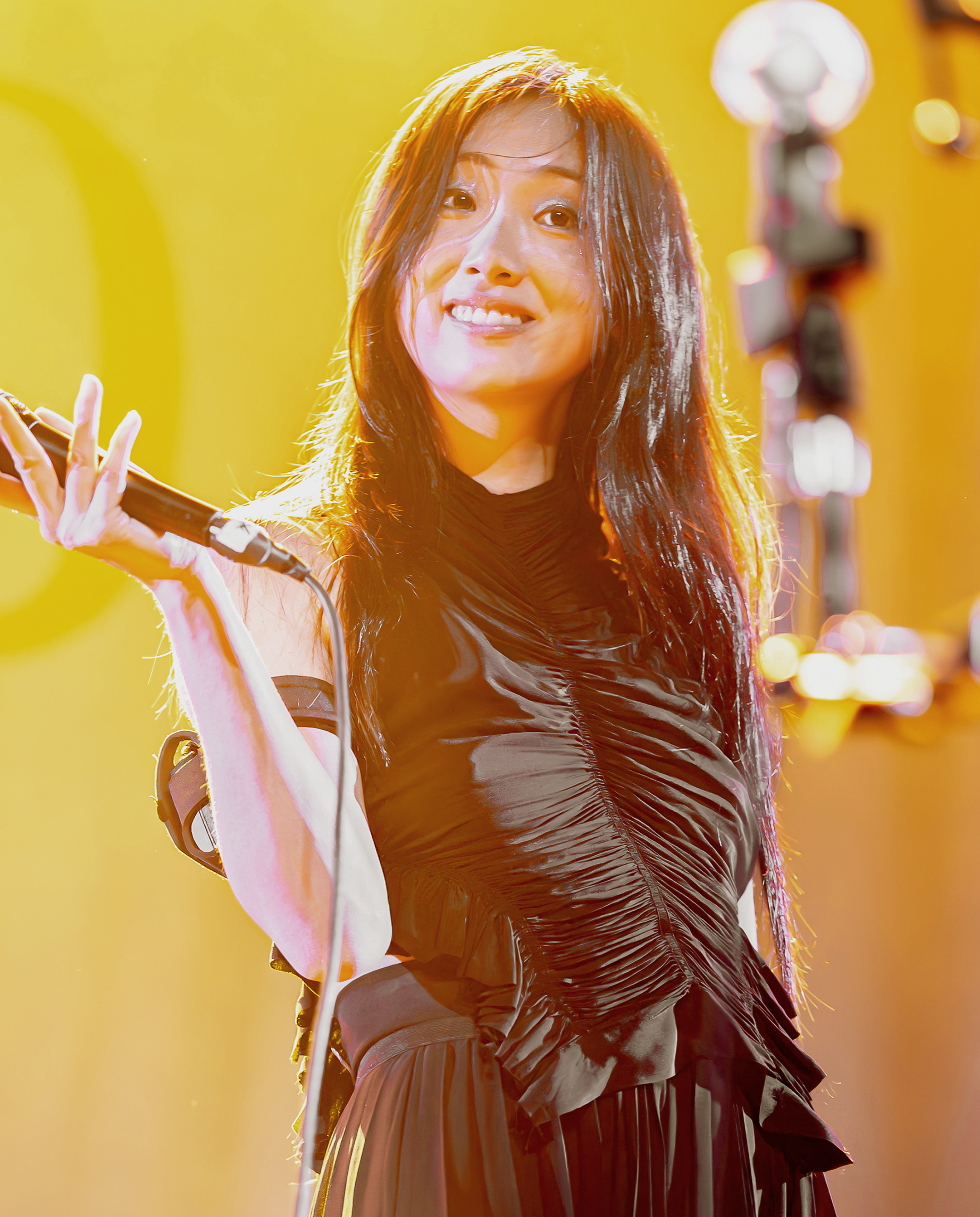
- Sarah Kinsley in 2026

Background information
- Born: Sarah Kinsley Du; July 18, 2000 (age 26); Mountain View, California, U.S.
- Origin: New York City, U.S.
- Genre: Alt pop
- Occupation: Singer-songwriter
- Instruments: Vocals; guitar; keyboards; violin; ondes Martenot
- Years active: 2019–present
- Website: www.sarahkinsleymusic.com

Sarah Kinsley (born July 18, 2000) is an American singer-songwriter. Throughout her childhood, she performed classical music in youth orchestras and eventually studied music at Columbia University, where she began to produce her own alt pop music. She has continually expressed the importance of her producing every aspect of her music due to the underrepresentation of female producers in the music industry. After her song "The King" had success on TikTok in 2021, she released an extended play (EP) of the same name, which was listed on NME's top debut projects of 2021. Kinsley followed up the project with subsequent EPs, Cypress (2022) and Ascension (2023). In 2024, she released her debut album Escaper.

== Life and career ==
Kinsley was born in 2000 in Mountain View, California, where she lived for the first five months of her life. She grew up in a small town in Connecticut and is of Chinese-American descent. On the presence of music in her early life, Kinsley said, "it was just everything. It was always there. I think that was part of the reason why I had to do music, in some form. At some point, it just became inseparable from life." As a child, Kinsley trained in classical piano and violin and performed in youth orchestras, where she earned a reputation for emotional performances. In middle school, Kinsley and her family moved to Singapore, where she attended an international school. Kinsley has cited her classical training as an important factor for her song production process. As a teenager, she began a journey into pop music, posting song covers of artists including Justin Bieber and Julia Michaels to Instagram. Kinsley was initially shy about her singing voice but found validation from the positive response to her videos.

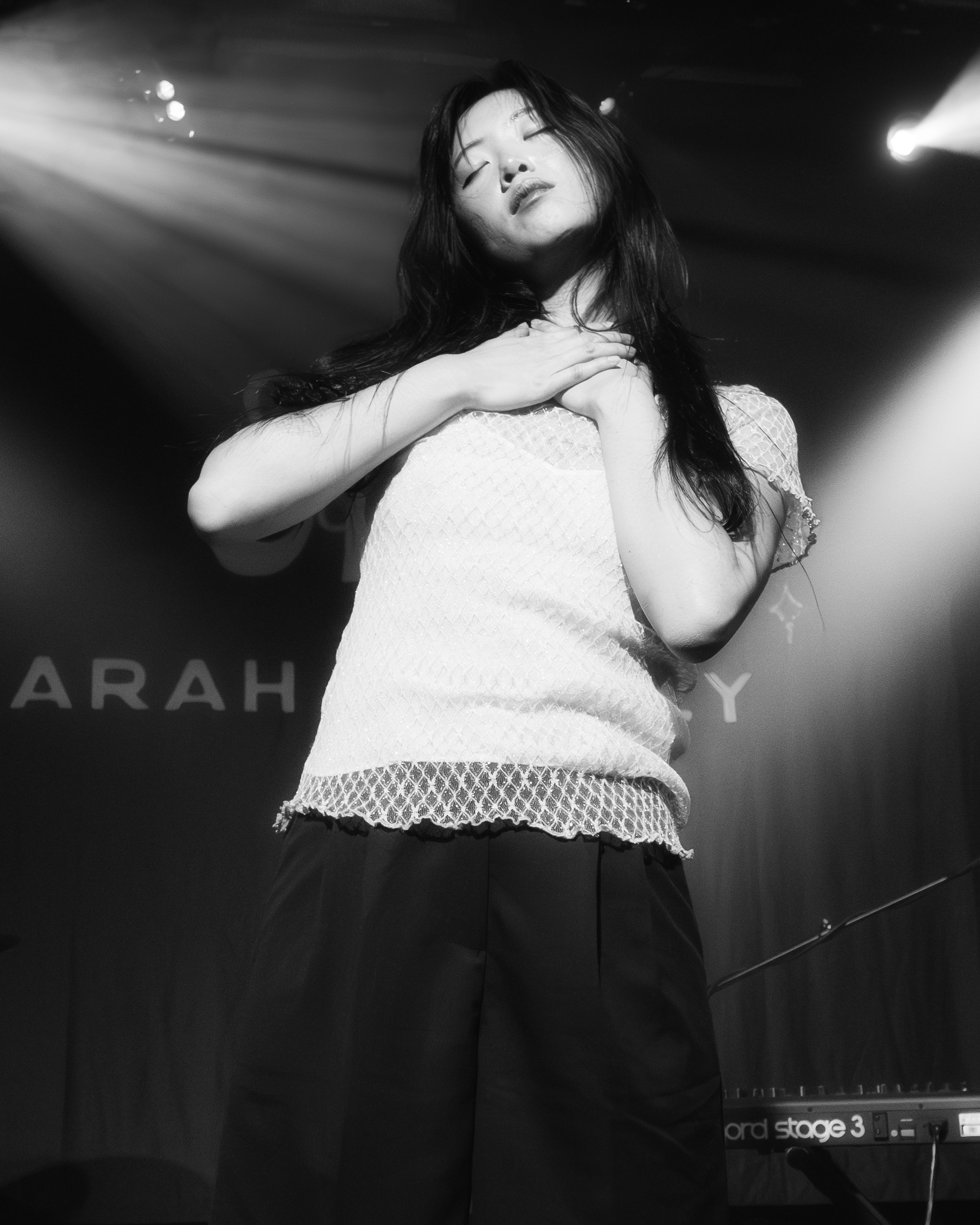
Sarah Kinsley performing.

Kinsley eventually moved to New York City. Years after she had attended the school in Singapore, she was contacted by former classmate Luc Bradford, who had become a music producer under the name ford.. He had seen her music covers online and reached out to make a song with Kinsley, and the pair released the song "Craving." Kinsley wrote the lyrics and Ford produced it. After releasing it, Kinsley said that although it gave her good contacts in the music industry, she received "twisted" compliments since she was just a feature on the song, with no input into the production. This inspired her to learn music production.

Kinsley studied music at Columbia University, where she was expected to produce and record songs, which she also released publicly. She revealed that after she submitted her 2021 single "Over + Under" for an assignment, she received a good grade in that class. Additionally, she was a member of Nonsequitur A Cappella. While studying at Columbia, Kinsley often experienced male classmates speaking over her and found it to be a male-geared environment. She explained that the music industry needs to "recognise and amplify female producers" such as herself. Kinsley met fellow musician Jane Paknia at Columbia; the two performed live together at the time, and toured the US and Europe later.

On June 4, 2021, Kinsley released the extended play (EP) The King, the title track of which went viral on TikTok. NME's Sophie Williams praised the EP. Despite it being a short EP at 20 minutes long, Williams opined that Kinsley had "meticulously crafted" the project. Williams later listed The King in NME's list of top debut projects of 2021, and Kinsley herself was listed in the publication's list of top 100 2022 emerging artists. In April 2022, Kinsley released the lead single from her third EP, "Hills of Fire". Speaking about the song to DIY magazine, she said that she wrote the song after The King had begun performing well commercially. She went with her family to California, where she was born, to escape from "the noise" of the press interviews, media and people's opinions. It was there that she formed the idea for her next EP to be bodied around "unravelling, the growth of uncertainty, the unknowing", and she felt that "Hills of Fire" embodied that. In May 2022, she released the second single, "What Was Mine". She subsequently announced that the EP would be titled Cypress, inspired by cypress trees that she kept seeing and looking out for whilst visiting California. It was released on June 10, 2022, and she supported its release with a North American tour.

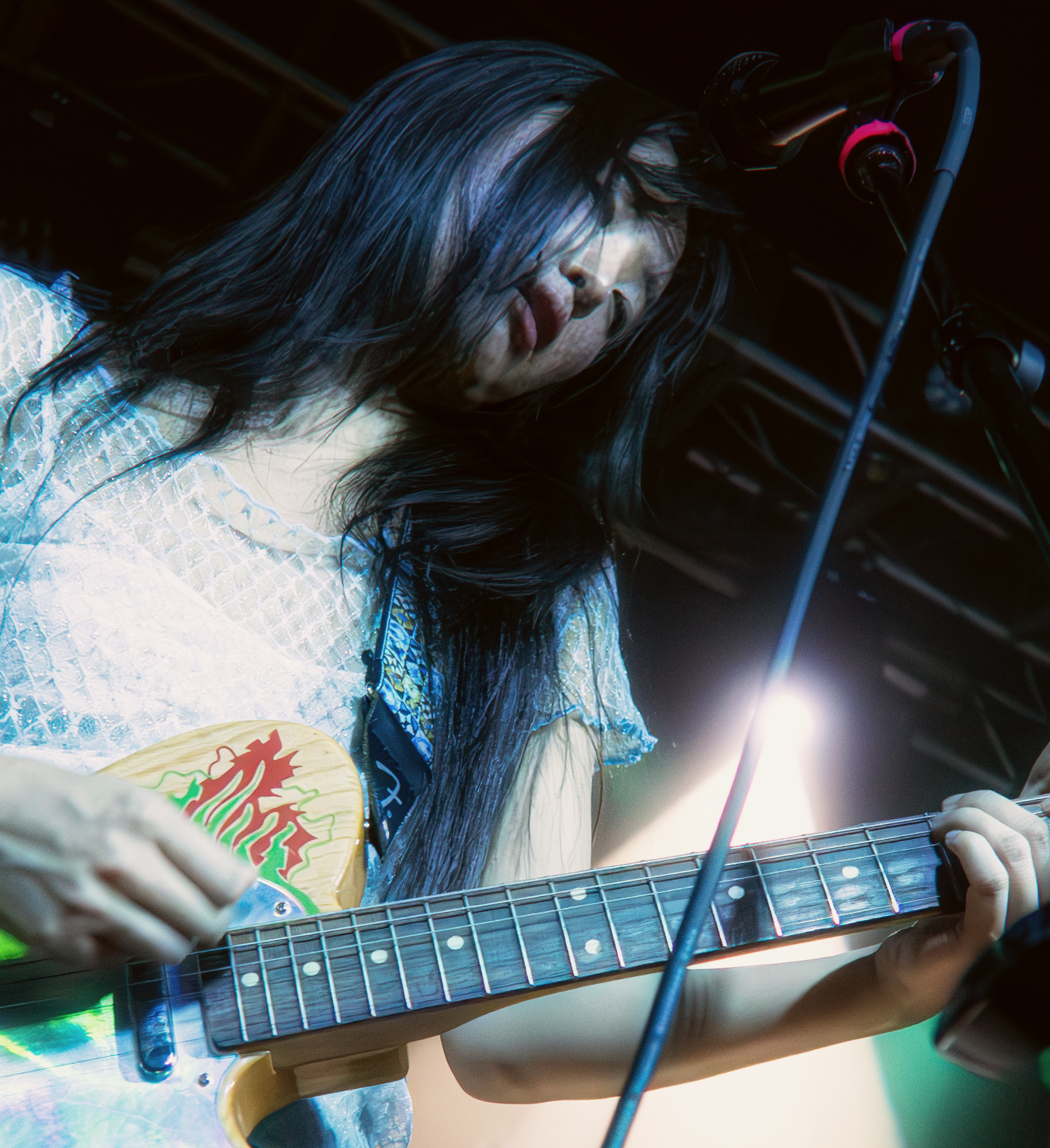
Sarah Kinsley performing at Neumos in September 2024

On October 21, 2022, Kinsley released the single "The Giver". She followed up its release with "Oh No Darling!". The song acted as the first release from her fourth EP, Ascension. The second single from the project, "Lovegod", was released on May 12, 2023.

On November 8, 2023, Vevo announced their 2024 list of "DSCVR Artists to Watch," including Sarah Kinsley on the list in the company of artists such as Chappell Roan and The Last Dinner Party.

On June 20, 2024, Kinsley released the single "Last Time We Never Meet Again", the lead single to her debut album Escaper. She then followed this up with two more singles, "Starling", on July 11, and "Realms", on August 1. The album was then released on September 6, 2024.

Over a year after the release of her debut album, Kinsley released "Fleeting," the lead single of her fifth EP of the same name. The five-track "Fleeting" EP, featuring artist Paris Paloma on track 4, was released on Friday, February 13, 2026.

== Artistry ==
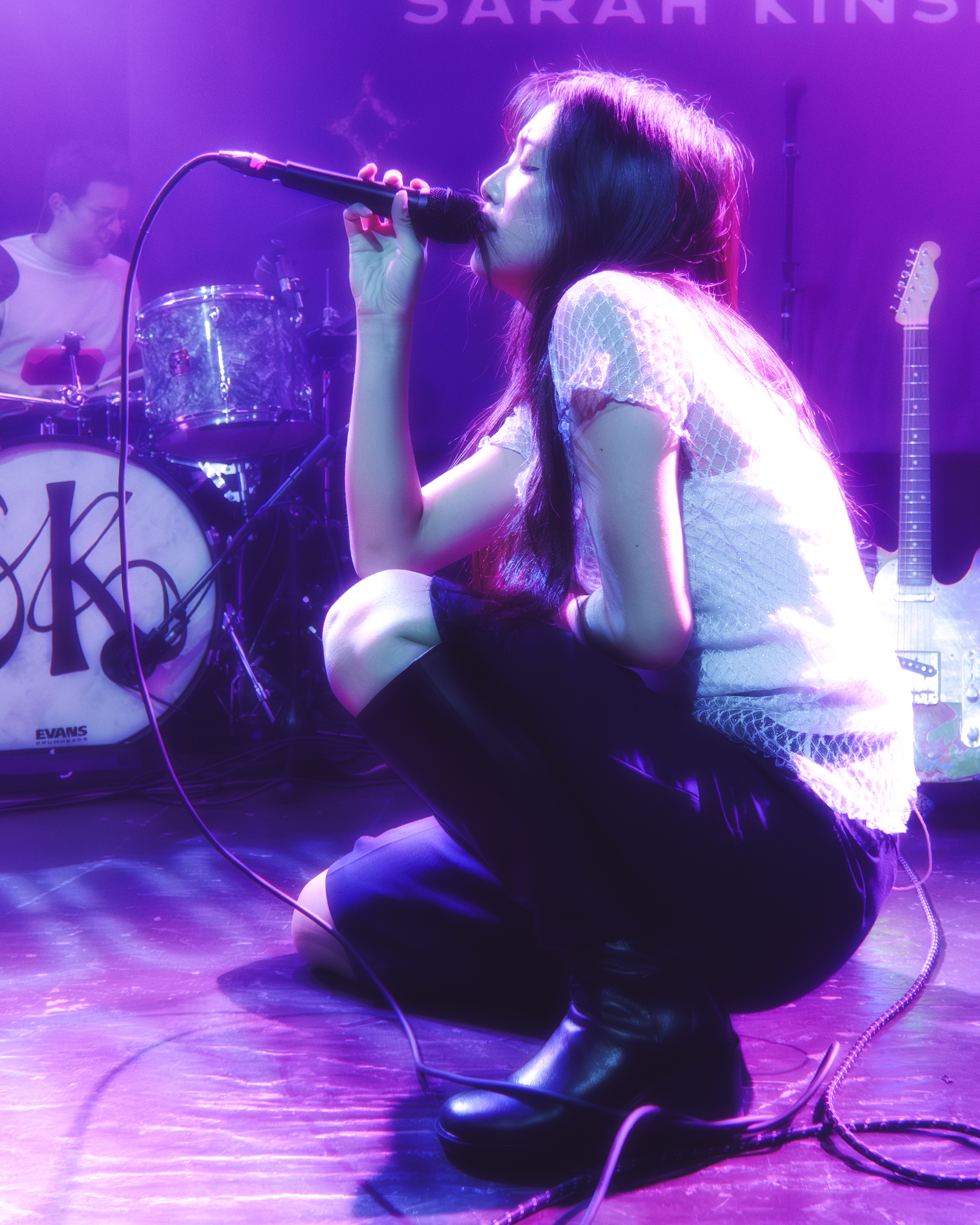
Sarah Kinsley performing.

Kinsley is mainly an alt pop singer. Kinsley has been inspired by classical music throughout her music as a result of studying it in her youth, specifically naming Chopin, Clara Schumann, Beethoven, Debussy and Ravel. She has cited New Zealand singer Lorde as a heavy inspiration for music, specifically noting the effect that her 2017 album Melodrama had on her music. She explained that she wants to create "juicy, sweet, daring, open, intimate, full songs that have no bounds" in the way that Lorde did on Melodrama. Fleetwood Mac, ABBA, Sting, the Eagles, Foreigner and Madonna have also been an inspiration for her.

== Discography ==
=== Studio albums ===
List of studio albums, with selected details
Title	Details
Escaper	Released: September 6, 2024; Format: Digital download, streaming, vinyl

=== Extended plays ===
List of extended plays, with selected details
Title	Details
The Fall	Released: April 10, 2020; Format: Digital download, streaming
The King	Released: June 4, 2021; Format: Digital download, streaming, vinyl
Cypress	Released: June 10, 2022; Format: Digital download, streaming, vinyl
Ascension	Released: June 9, 2023; Format: Digital download, streaming
Fleeting	Released: February 13, 2026

=== Singles ===
List of singles, showing year released and album name
Title	Year	Album
"Wine Stained Lips"	2019	Non-album single
"Open Your Eyes"	2019	The Fall
"Karma"	2021	The King
"Over + Under"	2021	The King
"Hills of Fire"	2022	Cypress
"What Was Mine"	2022	Cypress
"The Giver"	2022	Non-album single
"Oh No Darling!"	2023	Ascension
"Lovegod"	2023	Ascension
"Last Time We Never Meet Again"	2024	Escaper
"Starling"	2024	Escaper
"Realms"	2024	Escaper
"Fleeting"	2025	Fleeting
"Lonely Touch"	2026	Fleeting

== Tour ==
=== Headlining ===
- The Escaper Tour
- The Fleeting Tour (2026)

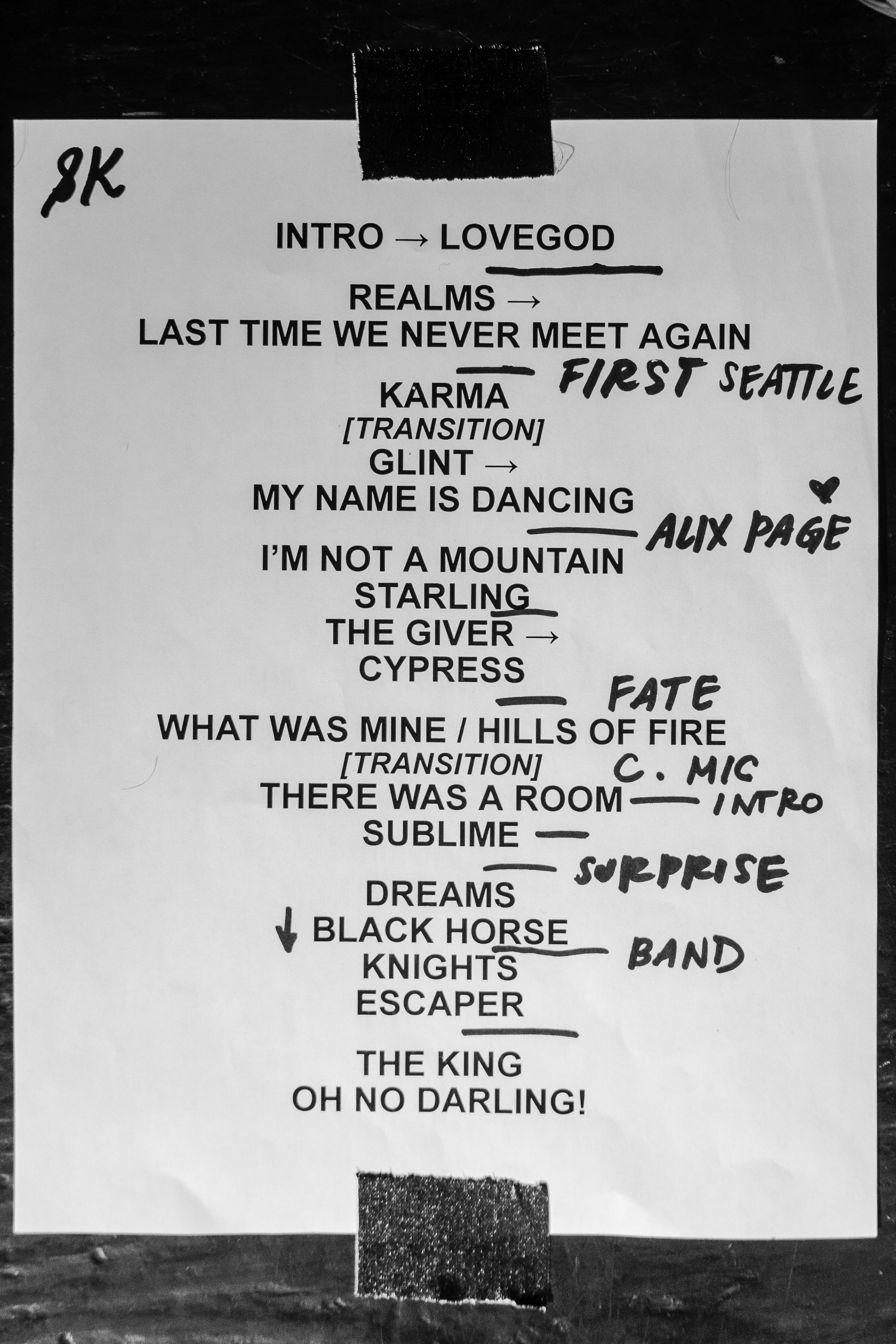
Sarah Kinsley's setlist.

=== Opening Act ===
- Mitski's The Land Is Inhospitable and So Are We Tour (Nashville only) (2024)
- Niki's Buzz World Tour (Australian dates) (2025)
