= Backburner (song) =

2022 song by Niki

Single by Niki

from the album Nicole
- Released: May 15, 2023
- Genre: Alternative R&B; alternative pop
- Length: 3:56
- Label: 88rising
- Songwriter: Nicole Zefanya
- Producers: Niki; Ethan Gruska

Niki singles chronology
"High School in Jakarta" (2022)	"Backburner" (2023)	"You'll Be In My Heart" (2022)

Music video
- "Backburner" on YouTube

"Backburner" is a song by Indonesian singer-songwriter Niki. It was released as a digital single for her second album Nicole on May 15, 2023, through 88rising. Written by Nicole Zefanya and produced by Niki and Ethan Gruska, the alternative R&B and alternative pop track explores the concept of looking back fondly at a past relationship, despite being conflicted and open to the possibility of reuniting.

== Background and release ==
After the release of her debut album, Moonchild in 2020. She released her second album, Nicole in 2022, alongside her pre-singles, "Before", "Oceans & Engines", and "High School in Jakarta".

Her second album, Nicole, features reimagined archived songs from Niki's past, along with several new tracks. She revealed that during the pandemic, she delved into her archived YouTube videos from middle school and discovered that these songs hold a special place in her heart. Niki also shared that the collaborative process of creating songs in their collaborators' garages and living rooms was carefree and energizing, resembling a child at the playground. The record helped Niki trust his gut and gain confidence as a songwriter and producer, making it more fun and freeing.

== Composition and lyrics ==
"Backburner" is three minutes and fifty-six seconds long, composed in the key of G with a time signature of 4/4, and has a tempo of 168 beats per minute. It was written by Nicole Zefanya and produced by Niki and Ethan Gruska.

Niki describes "Backburner" as a "replacement boyfriend" who offers the chance to find a compatible partner who may be exactly what one desires. Lyrically, it also explores the concept of looking back fondly at a past relationship, despite being conflicted and open to the possibility of reuniting. It tells the story of a woman who loves her crush even though she's not his priority. She's even willing to be his side interest.

== Music video ==
Directed by Isaac Ravishankara, it features her perspective on the tragic romance. Niki tries to repair the damaged connection between her and her partner by rewatching old footage to restore her fantasy world. However, her mission is unsuccessful, and her fantasy world is toppled, leaving her to rebuild the pieces.

== Critical performance ==
The song peaked in the Philippines at number eighteen on the Billboard Philippines Hot 100 charts in March 2025. The song debuted on the same month and later on peaked at number seventeen on the Billboard Indonesia Songs chart in May 2025.

== Listicles ==
Publisher	Year	Listicle	Placement	Ref.
Billboard Philippines	2025	8 Anthems For Those Not Ready To Move On	Placed	

== Credits and personnel ==
Credits are adapted from Apple Music.

- Niki — vocals, songwriter, producer
- Ethan Gruska — producer, recording engineer
- Rob Moose — arranger, violin, strings, string instrument
- Trevor Taylor — mixing engineer
- Dale Becker — mastering engineer
- Fili Filizzola — assistant mastering engineer
- Ivan Handwerk — assistant mixing engineer
- Katie Harvey — assistant mastering engineer
- Noah McCorkle — assistant mastering engineer
- Jeff Ellis — mixing engineer

== Charts ==
Chart performance for "Backburner"
Chart (2025)	Peak position
Indonesia (Billboard)	17
Philippines Hot 100 (Billboard Philippines)	18
