= Wanna Take This Downtown? =

2019 EP by Niki

EP by Niki
- Released: May 17, 2019
- Genre: R&B
- Length: 11:06
- Label: 88rising; 12Tone
- Producer: Niki; Jimmie Gutch; John Hill; Jordan Palmer; Z3N

Niki chronology
Zephyr (2018)	Wanna Take This Downtown? (2019)	Moonchild (2020)

Singles from Wanna Take This Downtown?
- 1. "Lowkey" Released: April 24, 2019

Wanna Take This Downtown? (stylized in all lowercase) is the second EP by Indonesian singer-songwriter Niki. It was released on May 17, 2019, through 88rising and 12Tone.

== Background ==
In 2017, Niki signed with the American record label 88rising. The following year, she released her debut EP, Zephyr. After its release, she began working on new music, including "Sugarplum Elegy," which came out in December 2018.

In April 2019, she released the song "Lowkey". After its release, she continued writing new songs, which eventually led to the creation of a four-song EP. In an interview with Kompas, she stated that the EP came together unexpectedly, as she initially planned to release only "Lowkey," but ended up writing "Urs" the following week.

== Critical reception ==
Robin Murray from Clash stated, "Blending R&B with elements of her own heritage, the new EP marks a remarkable comeback. Combining both classic and experimental R&B influences, the EP is infused with a deeply personal touch, thanks to her honest and candid lyricism".

== Track listing ==
Credits adapted from Spotify.

Wanna Take This Downtown? track listing
No.	Title	Writer(s)	Producer(s)	Length
1.	"Lowkey"	Nicole Zefanya; Juan Guerrieri Maril; Maisie Peters	Niki; Z3N	2:51
2.	"Urs"	Zefanya	Niki; Jimmie Gutch	2:37
3.	"Move!"	Sarah Aarons; John Hill; Jordan Palmer	Hill; Palmer	2:36
4.	"Odds"	Zefanya	Niki; Gutch	3:03
Total length:				11:06

Notes

- All track titles are stylized in lowercase.
