= Christianto Ario Wibowo =

- Born: Christianto Ario Wibowo; Jakarta, Indonesia
- Other name: Kurosuke
- Occupations: Musician; singer; songwriter
- Musical career
- Genres: Alternative rock
- Instruments: Vocals guitar
- Years active: 2012–present
- Member of: Anomalyst

Christianto Ario Wibowo, better known as Kurosuke, is an Indonesian singer. He is a vocalist of the Anomalyst band.

== Career ==
Wibowo started his career as a vocalist in Anomalyst. He then started his solo career under the name Kurosuke, by releasing his solo debut album Kurosuke on 18 Februari 2018. He released his second solo album The Tales of Roses and Wine on 25 Oktober 2019.

== Discography ==
=== Albums with Anomalyst ===
- Segara (2017)
- Cipta Rasa Karsa (2018)

=== Solo albums ===
- Kurosuke (2018)
- The Tales of Roses and Wine (2019)
