= SMA Negeri 82 Jakarta =

High school in Jakarta

Public Senior High School 82 Jakarta (Indonesian: SMA Negeri 82 Jakarta) is a public senior high school in Jakarta, Indonesia. It is located at Jl. Daha II / 15A, Kebayoran Baru, South Jakarta.
