= Every Summertime =

2021 song by Niki

Single by Niki

from the album Shang-Chi and the Legend of the Ten Rings: The Album
- Released: August 10, 2021
- Genre: Alternative R&B; soul
- Length: 3:35
- Label: Hollywood; Marvel Music; Interscope
- Songwriters: Nicole Zefanya; Jacob Ray
- Producers: Niki; Jacob Ray

Niki singles chronology
"Hallway Weather" (2020)	"Every Summertime" (2021)	"Split" (2021)

Music video
- "Every Summertime" on YouTube

"Every Summertime" is a song by Indonesian singer-songwriter Niki. It was released by Hollywood Records, Marvel Music, and Interscope Records on August 10, 2021, from the soundtrack of the Marvel Studios film Shang-Chi and the Legend of the Ten Rings, which premiered on September 3, 2021. Written and produced by Niki and Jacob Ray, it is an alternative R&B and soul track that explores two Asian college students who are falling in love in San Francisco.

The song received favorable reviews, describing it as a musical representation of Asian-American experience in the United States. Commercially, "Every Summertime" peaked at number 181 at the Billboard Global Excl. U.S. In Indonesia, it peaked at number two in Billboard Indonesia Songs. Meanwhile, in Malaysia, it went to top 10 and top 20 on two national charts, including the Billboard Malaysia Songs.

== Background and release ==
The album, Shang-Chi and the Legend of the Ten Rings: The Album featuring the film's score was released digitally by Marvel Music and Hollywood Records on September 1, 2021. Marvel Music, Hollywood Records, and Interscope Records also released four separate singles inspired by the film ahead of its release: "Lazy Susan" by 21 Savage and Rich Brian, "Every Summertime" by Niki, "Run It" by DJ Snake, Rick Ross, and Rich Brian, and "In the Dark" by Swae Lee & Jhené Aiko.

== Composition ==
"Every Summertime" is three minutes and thirty-five seconds long, composed in the key of F with a time signature of 4/4, and has a tempo of 79 beats per minute. Written and produced by Niki and Jacob Ray, it is an alternative R&B and soul track that explores two Asian college students who are falling in love in San Francisco.

"Every Summertime came together so fast–we wrote it in less than an hour! It was one of those magical moments where there's a special kind of alchemy happening whilst creating and now it's one of our favorite songs of our careers", Niki shared. In an interview with Teen Vogue, Niki shared "I think I just wanted to get at the Asian diasporic experience", "What it would look like for two first-generation Asian Americans, going to college and falling in love—that was the inspiration." She added.

Barry White was cited as an influence on Niki and her producer Jacob Ray's sleeper hit "Every Summertime". "Nobody really talks in their songs anymore", "I feel like that trend died in the ‘90s – where it’d be music and just really low voices. We were listening to them just bewildered as to how people made music back then." Niki explained.

== Music video ==
Niki has released four music videos for her song "Every Summertime". The first video, released on August 9, 2021, played by rapper and actor Dumbfoundead and Minari star Alan Kim, follows a father and son driving around a neighborhood. While the second video, released on September 4, features Niki singing and making her way through the aisles of a 99 Ranch Supermarket. The third video, released on December 11, is more autobiographical, following Niki's music journey from college student to rising superstar. The fourth video, released on February 8, 2022, is a short film that focuses on a young couple in Los Angeles in the 1970s who receive a gift box revealing a pair of shoes. The film then shifts to the present day, following an elderly man in Chinatown as he prepares for his 50th anniversary. The video flashes back to the couple's love story, culminating in the old man performing a heartwarming dance sequence in memory of his late wife at the iconic Chinatown Central Plaza.

== Reception ==
Ligaya Mishan of The New York Times wrote in an article that said, "For decades, there was little room in mainstream Western pop for women who were discernible as Asian."

Commercially, "Every Summertime" made its way to number two at Billboard Indonesia Songs in the first week since its chart debut in February 2022. Meanwhile, the track entered at number 181 in February 2022 at the Billboard Global Excl. U.S, where it marked the highest debut for Niki's song until her rendition song, You'll Be In My Heart, which also peaked at number 50 in April 2025. In the Philippines, it also made its way to number three in February 2022 at Billboard Philippines Songs, which also made its chart debut.

In January 2022, the single has reached the top 50 on Spotify's Daily Top 50 in various countries, including the Philippines, Indonesia, Thailand, Malaysia, and Singapore, and has also reached the Global Daily Viral 50. As of August 2025, the track reached over 500 million streams on Spotify.

== Credits and personnel ==
Credits are adapted from Apple Music.

- Niki — vocals, songwriter, producer
- Jacob Ray — songwriter, producer
- Dale Becker — mastering engineer
- Jeff Ellis — mixing engineer
- Bianca McClure — violin
- Camille Miller — violin
- Johan Lenox — string instrument
- Marza Wilks — cello

== Charts ==
Chart performance for "Every Summertime"
Chart (2022)	Peak position
Global Excl. US (Billboard)	181
Indonesia (Billboard)	2
Malaysia (RIM)	9
New Zealand Hot Singles (RMNZ)	11
Philippines (Billboard)	3
Singapore (RIAS)	11
Vietnam (Vietnam Hot 100)	56
