= Nicole (album) =

2022 album by Niki

Studio album by Niki
- Released: August 12, 2022
- Genre: Alternative pop; folk-pop
- Length: 46:43
- Label: 88rising
- Producer: Niki; Jacob Ray; Reske; Ethan Gruska; Tim Anderson

Niki chronology
Moonchild (2020)	Nicole (2022)	Buzz (2024)

Singles from Nicole
- 1. "Before" Released: June 3, 2022; 2. "Oceans & Engines" Released: July 8, 2022; 3. "High School in Jakarta" Released: August 5, 2022; 4. "Backburner" Released: May 15, 2023

Nicole is the second studio album by Indonesian singer-songwriter Niki. It was released on August 12, 2022, through 88rising.

== Background ==
Zefanya stated on social media that the album would be made up of old songs she posted on YouTube at the beginning of her career, saying that she had "quietly been re-recording and reimagining" those songs. While addressing and thanking her social media followers she said that through her YouTube channel, she found her "first creative outlet & community", and that her followers' support "made the dream seem a little less impossible". Zefanya cited the series of re-recorded albums American singer-songwriter Taylor Swift (known as "Taylor's Version") has been releasing as one of the inspirations behind Nicole.

The album features twelve tracks, two of them being the previously released singles "Before" and "Oceans & Engines". On August 5, 2022, a third and final song was released, titled "High School in Jakarta", alongside a music video uploaded on Zefanya's YouTube channel. The title of the album comes from Zefanya's full first name, Nicole.

== Critical reception ==
Khyne Palumar from NME stated, "On Nicole, Zefanya reconnects with her folk-pop roots, ditching the string of co-writers and savvy pop sheen of Moonchild. She instead reproduces songs written in her teens, embracing both raw confessionals and unapologetic schmaltz."

Danielle Chelosky from Uproxx said that the album "feels like a warm welcome. Her recollections of high school can make the listener feel like they're her old friend, and Zefanya is catching them up on what they've missed. Her reckonings with love are often so simultaneously thoughtful and whimsical, approaching Taylor Swift-level genius."

== Track listing ==
All tracks are written by Nicole Zefanya.

No.	Title	Producer(s)	Length
1.	"Before"	Niki; Jacob Ray	3:54
2.	"High School in Jakarta"	Niki; Ray; Reske	3:39
3.	"Backburner"	Niki; Ethan Gruska	3:56
4.	"Keeping Tabs"	Niki; Gruska	2:57
5.	"The Apartment We Won't Share"	Niki; Gruska	2:29
6.	"Facebook Friends"	Niki; Ray	3:57
7.	"Anaheim"	Niki; Ray	4:14
8.	"Milk Teeth"	Niki; Ray	2:50
9.	"Autumn"	Niki; Ray; Tim Anderson	3:52
10.	"Oceans & Engines"	Niki; Ray	5:36
11.	"On the Drive Home"	Niki; Ray	4:16
12.	"Take A Chance With Me"	Niki; Ray; Reske	5:03
Total length:			46:48

== Charts ==
Chart performance for Nicole
Chart (2023)	Peak position
US Top Current Album Sales (Billboard)	64
