= Niki (singer) =

Indonesian singer-songwriter (born 1999)

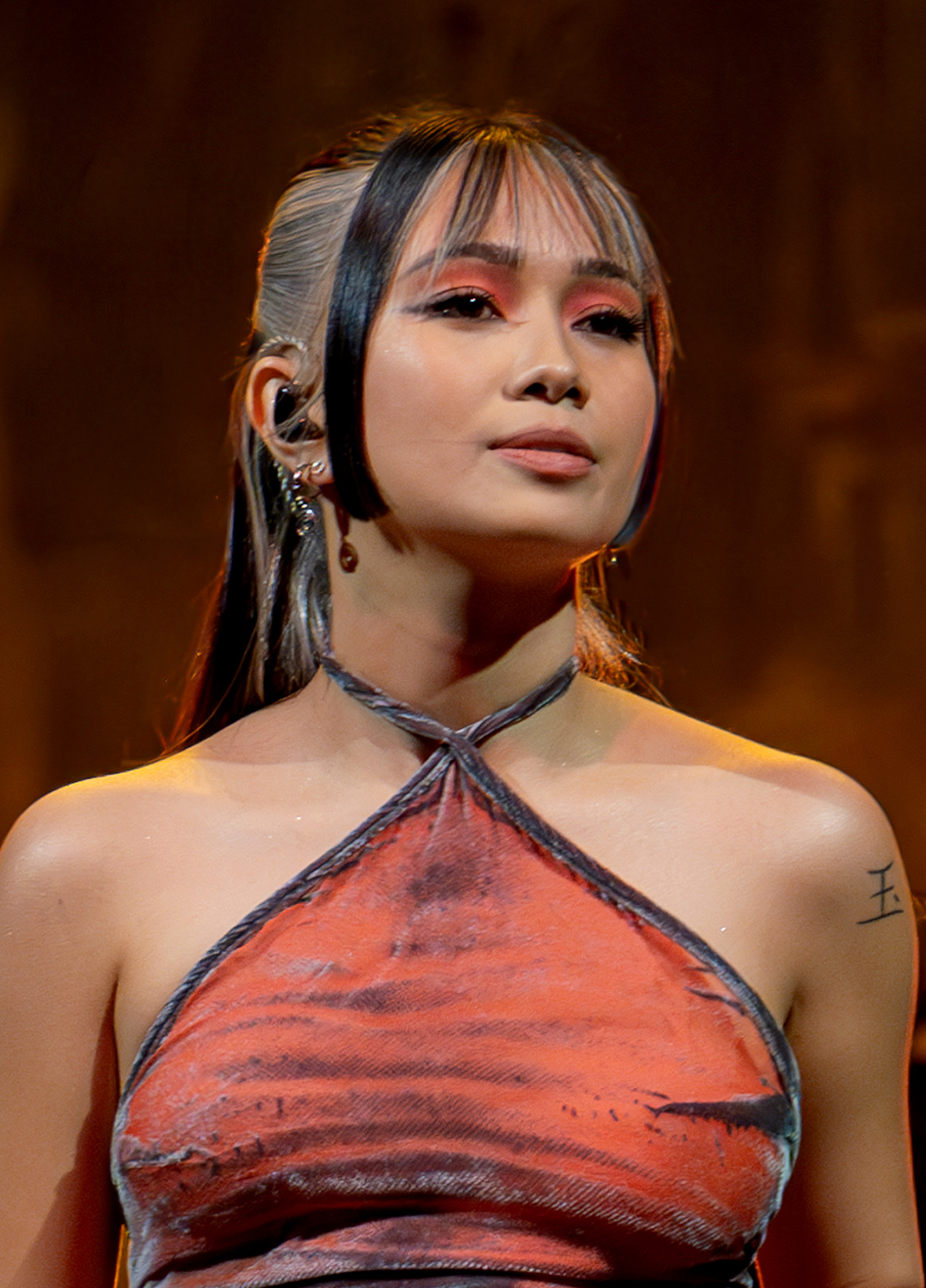
- Niki in 2024
- Born: Nicole Zefanya; January 24, 1999 (age 27); Jakarta, Indonesia
- Education: Lipscomb University
- Occupations: Singer; songwriter; record producer
- Musical career
- Genres: Alternative pop; alternative R&B
- Instruments: Vocals; guitar; ukulele; keyboards
- Years active: 2017–present
- Labels: 88rising; Empire Distribution
- Website: nikizefanya.com

Nicole Zefanya (born January 24, 1999), known professionally as Niki (stylized in all caps), is an Indonesian singer-songwriter. Having garnered global recognition for her songwriting and musicianship, she is currently based in the United States and signed with the record label 88rising. She is best known from her global hit "Every Summertime", which was part of the soundtrack for the film Shang-Chi and the Legend of the Ten Rings and later was certified gold by the RIAA for selling over 500,000 copies.

Her debut full-length studio album, Moonchild (2020), was named one of the best Asian albums of the year by NME. Niki entered the album charts in the US and the UK with Nicole (2022) and Buzz (2024). She has performed solo concerts in 17 countries across Asia, Australia, Europe, and North America during the Nicole World Tour (2022–2023) and the Buzz World Tour (2024–2025), including arena shows in Canada, England, Indonesia, Malaysia, the Philippines, and Singapore.

Niki is the most-streamed Indonesian artist, with over 5 billion streams on Spotify as of June 2025. She is the first Indonesian woman to receive a Gold certification in the US. Her hit songs include global chart entries "Every Summertime" and "You'll Be in My Heart", as well as "Lowkey", "La La Lost You", "Oceans & Engines", "High School in Jakarta", "Backburner", and "Take A Chance With Me", which all reached top 40 in several Asian countries. In 2020, Niki was listed on Forbes' 30 Under 30 Asia.

== Early life ==
Niki was born on January 24, 1999, and was raised in Jakarta, Indonesia. She is of Chinese and Minahasan descent. Niki taught herself how to play and write music from a young age, after receiving her first guitar at 9 years old. She grew up to '90s music, R&B and hip-hop, along with her mother who would sing gospel in the church. Niki attended Pelita Harapan School in Jakarta.

At 15, Niki won a contest to perform as the opening act for Taylor Swift's The Red Tour in Jakarta. As a teenager, Niki maintained a YouTube channel, on which she uploaded original songs and covers, performed on acoustic guitar and filmed in her bedroom.

== Career ==
In 2017, Niki moved from Jakarta to Nashville, Tennessee, to study music at Lipscomb University. During this time, she released her first singles "I Like U" and "See U Never" under the name Niki through the American record label 88rising. On July 20, 2018, Niki appeared on the 88rising collaborative album Head in the Clouds, contributing five songs.

On April 24, 2019, Niki released the single "Lowkey", leading into her second EP wanna take this downtown?. In October 2019, Niki appeared on 88rising's Head in the Clouds II. In support of the album, Niki released a live acoustic EP titled Niki Acoustic Sessions: Head in the Clouds II. On April 2, 2020, Niki released the single "Switchblade" and announced her debut full-length album Moonchild. This was followed by the subsequent singles "Selene" and "Lose". Moonchild was released on September 10, 2020. In support of the album, Niki premiered a livestream concert titled Moonchild Experience, which aired October 10, 2021, on YouTube and Kaskus TV. On December 15, 2020, Niki released a holiday single titled "Hallway Weather". On August 10, 2021, Niki released "Every Summertime", the lead single from the official soundtrack to Shang-Chi and the Legend of the Ten Rings. Niki contributed four songs to the film's soundtrack, which was released on September 3, 2021.

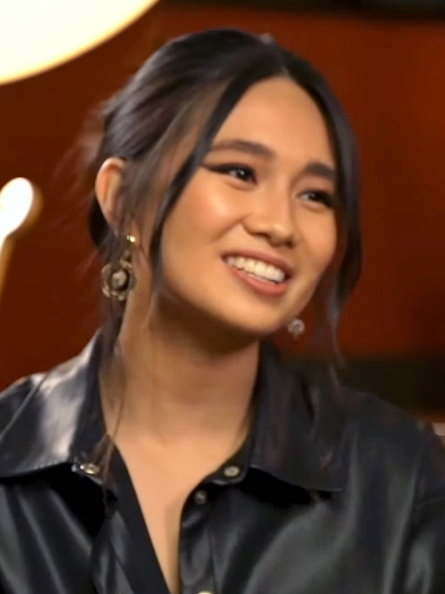
Niki in 2022

In April 2022, Niki made her debut appearance at the Coachella Valley Music and Arts Festival alongside labelmate Rich Brian, becoming the first Indonesian artists to perform at the festival.

Niki performing at The Wiltern, 2022

On June 3, 2022, Niki released the first single from her sophomore album Nicole, titled "Before". This was followed by the announcement of The Nicole Tour, her debut North American tour. Subsequent singles from Nicole include "Oceans and Engines" (released July 8, 2022) and "High School in Jakarta" (released August 5, 2022). On August 12, 2022, Nicole was released. Vanity Fair contributor Delia Cai wrote that Nicole is "a sonic time capsule of a breakup album that explores heartache in perhaps its most devastating form." NPR discussed Nicole on its All Songs Considered podcast and stated, "Something Niki does really well is get to the emotional heart of the matter."

Alongside the album, a short film titled But I'm Letting Go starring Niki and Peter Adrian Sudarso and directed by Isaac Ravishankara was released through Amazon Prime Video on August 18, 2022. The short film was supported by screening events in Los Angeles, New York, and Jakarta. In October 2022, Niki announced the Asia leg of The Nicole Tour.

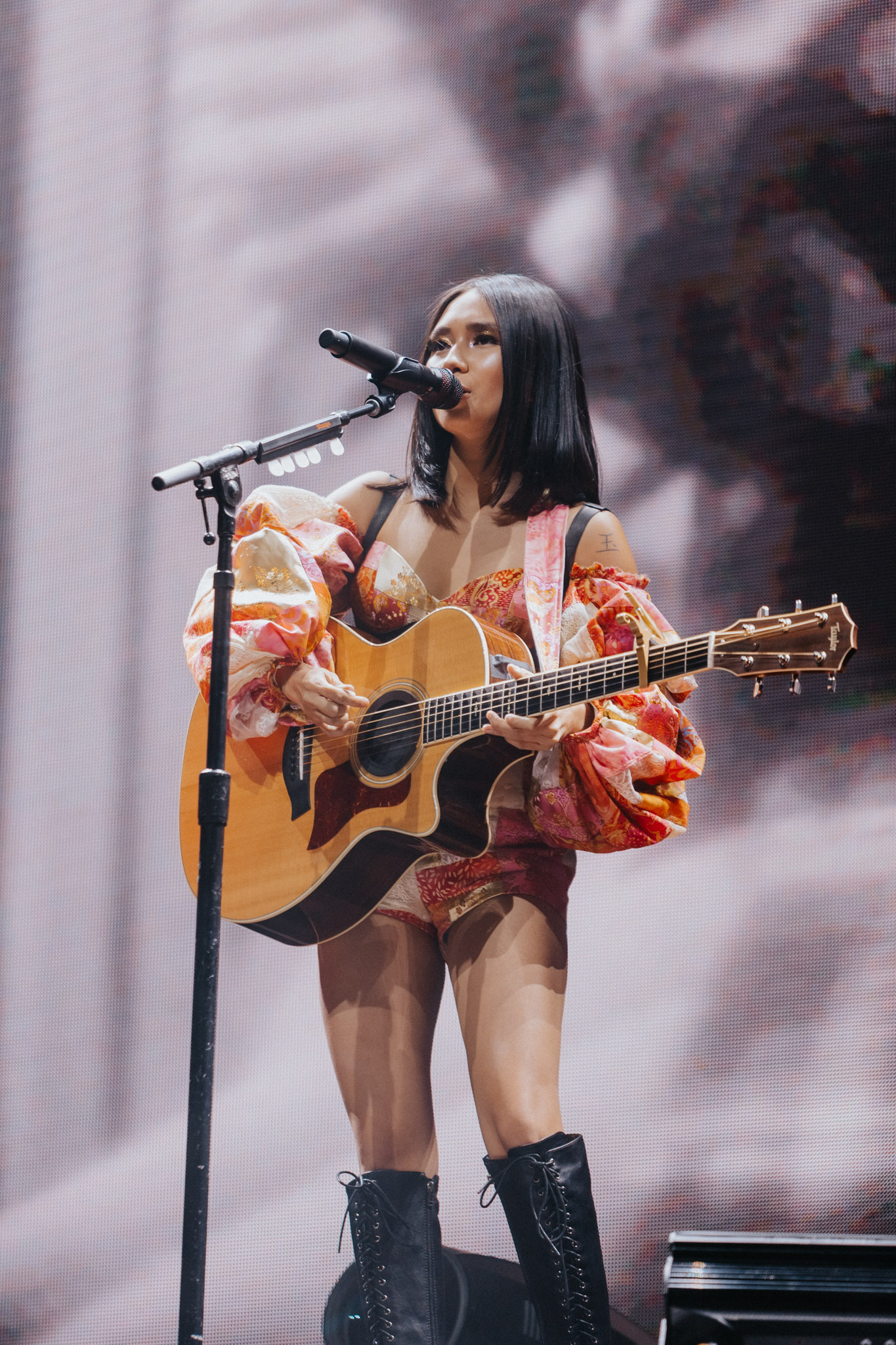
Niki performing at Head in the Clouds New York, 2023

In April 2023, Niki appeared on the cover of Vogue Singapore's "Pop" issue. In May 2023, Niki released Niki: Live at The Wiltern, her first live album. Alongside the release, she announced expanded tour dates for The Nicole Tour, which included festival performances at Lollapalooza, Outside Lands, 2023 Singapore Grand Prix and headline shows across North America, Southeast Asia, Europe, and Australia. On May 31, 2023, Niki made her debut appearance on NPR's Tiny Desk Concerts, performing "Every Summertime" alongside three songs from Nicole. NPR writer and editor Stephen Thompson wrote that the set had him "swaying, swooning and swimming in high hopes".

On January 12, 2024, Niki released the single "24", which she wrote in an attempt to synthesize her early twenties and many humbling things she had learned before turning 25. On May 3, 2024, she released "Too Much of a Good Thing", the lead single for her third album Buzz. This was followed by the announcement of Buzz World Tour (2024–2025). Subsequent singles includes "Blue Moon" (released on June 21, 2024) and "Tsunami" (released on July 26, 2024). Buzz was released on August 9, 2024.

== Discography ==
- Moonchild (2020)
- Nicole (2022)
- Buzz (2024)

== Concert tours ==
=== Headlining ===
- Nicole World Tour (2022–2023)
- Buzz World Tour (2024–2025)
- Summertime 2026 (2026)

=== Opening act ===
- Taylor Swift's The Red Tour (Jakarta only) (2014)
- Rich Brian's Australia & New Zealand Tour (2018)
- Halsey's Hopeless Fountain Kingdom Tour (All Asia dates) (2018)

== Accolades ==
Name of the award ceremony, year presented, category, nominee of the award, and the result of the nomination
Award ceremony	Year	Category	Nominee / Work	Result	Ref.
MTV Europe Music Award	2022	Best Asian Act	Niki	Nominated	
Filipino Music Awards	2025	People's Choice Awards – International Artist	Niki	Nominated	

=== Honors ===
Name of country or organization, year given, and name of honor
Country or organization	Year	Honor	Ref.
Recording Industry Association of America	2025	Gold Certification (for Every Summertime)	

=== Listicles ===
Name of publisher, year listed, name of listicle, and placement
Publisher	Year	Listicle	Placement	Ref.
Complex	2018	The Best New Artists of 2018	13th	
Forbes	2020	30 Under 30 Asia	Placed	
NME	2020	The 25 Best Asian Albums of 2020	1st	

== See also ==
- Rich Brian
- Stephanie Poetri
