= High School in Jakarta =

Single by Niki

from the album Nicole
- Released: August 5, 2022
- Length: 3:39
- Label: 88rising
- Songwriter: Nicole Zefanya
- Producers: Niki; Jacob Ray; Reske

Niki singles chronology
| "Oceans & Engines" (2022) | "High School in Jakarta" (2022) | "Backburner" (2023) |

Music video
- "High School in Jakarta" on YouTube

"High School in Jakarta" is a song by Indonesian singer-songwriter Niki. It was released by 88rising as the third and final single from her second studio album Nicole (2022) on August 5, 2022.

== Music videos ==
The music video was released alongside the single on August 5, 2022. It depicts Niki as a high school version of herself.

The video was filmed at Palisades Charter High School in Pacific Palisades, Los Angeles.

== Charts ==
Chart performance for "High School in Jakarta"
| Chart (2022) | Peak position |
|---|---|
| Indonesia (Billboard) | 2 |
| Malaysia (Billboard) | 9 |
| Malaysia International (RIM) | 6 |
| Singapore (RIAS) | 28 |
