= Moonchild (Niki album) =

Debut studio album by Indonesian singer-songwriter Niki

Studio album by Niki
- Released: September 10, 2020
- Recorded: 2018–2019
- Genre: Alternative R&B; electropop; R&B
- Length: 34:51
- Label: 88rising; 12Tone
- Producer: Bēkon; Taylor Dexter; Heavy Mellow; Niki; Pomo; Jacob Ray; Wesley Singerman; Starsmith; The Donuts

Niki chronology
Wanna Take This Downtown? (2019)	Moonchild (2020)	Nicole (2022)

Singles from Moonchild
- 1. "Switchblade" Released: April 2, 2020; 2. "Selene" Released: July 16, 2020; 3. "Lose" Released: August 13, 2020

Moonchild (stylized as MOONCHILD) is the debut studio album by Indonesian singer-songwriter Niki. It was released on September 10, 2020, by 88rising and 12Tone Music.

== Background ==
This album was composed over the course of two years. It has been described as a concept album. The album is divided into three parts. According to a press release from 12Tone Music, these three parts represent three lunar phases of self-exploration: crescent moon (innocence, curiosity, embarking); half-moon/eclipse (loss of hope, disillusionment); and the full moon (self-discovery, strength).

Speaking on the title of the album, Zefanya stated in an interview with Hypebae

The word “moonchild” came to me when I was going through a phase of being up at ungodly hours of the night strictly to write music. I realized how much more energized and stimulated I felt at night compared to the day, and I referred to myself as some “child of the moon” because of it."

== Release and promotion ==
The album was originally scheduled to be released in late 2019, but was pushed back a year later on September 10, 2020. The album's first single, "Switchblade" was released on April 2, 2020. The album's second single, "Selene" was released on July 16, 2020. The third and final single from the album, "Lose" was released on August 13, 2020.

On October 10, 2020, Zefanya held a virtual livestream concert titled the Moonchild Experience. It was streamed on YouTube for global audiences and KASKUS TV for Indonesian viewers.

In January 2021, Zefanya collaborated with clothing brand Guess, releasing clothing inspired by the album.

== Track listing ==
Credits adapted from Spotify.

No.	Title	Writer(s)	Producer(s)	Length
1.	"Wide Open (Foreword)"	Craig Balmoris; Daniel Kreiger; Daniel Tannenbaum; Nicole Zefanya; Sergiu Gherman; Tyler Mehlenbacher	Bēkon; The Donuts	2:59

Phase One
No.	Title	Writer(s)	Producer(s)	Length
2.	"Switchblade"	Jacob Ray; Zefanya	Ray; Niki	3:24
3.	"Nightcrawlers"	Tannenbaum; Ray; Zefanya; Gherman; Mehlenbacher	Bēkon; Ray; The Donuts	3:27
4.	"Selene"	Ray; Zefanya	Ray; Pomo	3:17

Phase Two
No.	Title	Writer(s)	Producer(s)	Length
5.	"Tide"	Ray; Zefanya	Ray	3:04
6.	"Pandemonium"	Balmoris; Kreiger; Tannenbaum; Zefanya; Gherman; Mehlenbacher	Bēkon; Ray; The Donuts	3:47
7.	"Lose"	Finlay Dow-Smith; Natalia Sinclair; Zefanya	Bēkon; Starsmith; Ray^{[a]}	4:16

Phase Three
No.	Title	Writer(s)	Producer(s)	Length
8.	"Plot Twist"	Zefanya	Ray; Niki	3:27
9.	"If There's Nothing Left..."	Balmoris; Kreiger; Tannenbaum; Zefanya; Gherman; Mehlenbacher	Bēkon; The Donuts	3:30
10.	"Drive On"	Balmoris; Kreiger; Tannenbaum; Zefanya; Gherman; Stuart Johnson; Mehlenbacher	Bēkon; The Donuts	3:37
Total length:				34:51

Notes

- ^{^[a]}indicates an additional producer
