= Runaway Tour (Post Malone) =

2019–20 concert tour by Post Malone

- Tour by Post Malone
- Associated album: Hollywood's Bleeding
- Start date: September 14, 2019
- End date: March 12, 2020
- Legs: 2
- No. of shows: 59
- Supporting acts: Swae Lee; Tyla Yaweh
- Attendance: 746,310
- Box office: $92,602,548

Post Malone concert chronology
- Beerbongs & Bentleys Tour (2018–2019); Runaway Tour (2019–2020); Twelve Carat Tour (2022–2023)

Runaway Tour was the fourth concert tour by American musician Post Malone, in support of his third studio album Hollywood's Bleeding (2019). The tour started in Tacoma, Washington, on September 14, 2019, and concluded in Denver, Colorado, on March 12, 2020.

== Background and development ==
On July 15, 2019, the rapper announced he would be going on tour again after he wrapped up the Beerbongs & Bentleys Tour on August 25, 2019. The tour featured the second annual Posty Fest in Arlington, and appearances at music festivals in Las Vegas and New Orleans. Swae Lee and Tyla Yaweh were announced as opening acts.

On November 19, 2019, a second North American leg was announced for 2020, with Swae Lee and Tyla Yaweh returning as opening acts.

A concert film showcasing the tour titled Post Malone: Runaway was released exclusively on Amazon Freevee on August 12, 2022.

== Reception ==
Jessica Shalvoy of Variety praised Post Malone for their efforts during his show at Inglewood, quoting that "destroying a guitar and pouring out two solo cups of what we can assume is Bud Light, finishing off his hit “Rockstar” — and fully living up to the title."

== Set list ==
This set list is from the concert on September 21, 2019, in Fresno. It is not intended to represent all shows from the tour.

1. "Hollywood's Bleeding"
2. "Better Now"
3. "Saint-Tropez"
4. "Goodbyes"
5. "Die for Me"
6. "Allergic"
7. "Candy Paint"
8. "Psycho"
9. "Enemies"
10. "Wow"
11. "Paranoid"
12. "I Fall Apart"
13. "Over Now"
14. "Take What You Want"
15. "Stay" (Acoustic)
16. "Circles"
17. "Go Flex"
18. "White Iverson"
19. "Sunflower" (with Swae Lee)
20. "Rockstar"
21. "Congratulations"

== Tour dates ==
List of 2019 concerts, showing date, city, country, venue, opening acts, tickets sold, number of available tickets and amount of gross revenue
Date	City	Country	Venue	Opening acts	Attendance	Revenue
September 14, 2019	Tacoma	United States	Tacoma Dome	Swae Lee; Tyla Yaweh	16,356 / 16,356	$1,723,450
September 16, 2019	Vancouver	Canada	Rogers Arena	Swae Lee; Tyla Yaweh	14,541 / 14,541	$1,474,400
September 17, 2019	Portland	United States	Moda Center	Swae Lee; Tyla Yaweh	12,323 / 12,323	$1,220,548
September 19, 2019	Sacramento	United States	Golden 1 Center	Swae Lee; Tyla Yaweh	13,496 / 13,496	$1,598,148
September 21, 2019	Fresno	United States	Save Mart Center	Tyla Yaweh	11,484 / 11,484	$1,395,146
September 22, 2019 (Note: The concert of September 22, 2019, at Downtown Las Vegas in Las Vegas is part of Life Is Beautiful Music & Art Festival.)	Las Vegas	United States	Downtown Las Vegas	—N/a	—N/a	—N/a
September 26, 2019	Saint Paul	United States	Xcel Energy Center	Swae Lee; Tyla Yaweh	27,543 / 27,543	$3,132,343
September 27, 2019	Saint Paul	United States	Xcel Energy Center	Swae Lee; Tyla Yaweh	27,543 / 27,543	$3,132,343
September 29, 2019	Detroit	United States	Little Caesars Arena	Swae Lee; Tyla Yaweh	14,108 / 14,108	$1,944,647
October 1, 2019	Chicago	United States	United Center	Swae Lee; Tyla Yaweh	14,585 / 14,585	$1,985,303
October 3, 2019	Toronto	Canada	Scotiabank Arena	Swae Lee; Tyla Yaweh	28,492 / 28,492	$3,083,830
October 4, 2019	Toronto	Canada	Scotiabank Arena	Swae Lee; Tyla Yaweh	28,492 / 28,492	$3,083,830
October 6, 2019	Buffalo	United States	KeyBank Center	Swae Lee; Tyla Yaweh	13,861 / 13,861	$1,483,223
October 8, 2019	Boston	United States	TD Garden	Swae Lee; Tyla Yaweh	26,437 / 26,437	$3,421,341
October 9, 2019	Boston	United States	TD Garden	Swae Lee; Tyla Yaweh	26,437 / 26,437	$3,421,341
October 11, 2019	Atlantic City	United States	Boardwalk Hall	Swae Lee; Tyla Yaweh	12,907 / 12,907	$1,746,987
October 12, 2019	Washington, D.C.	United States	Capital One Arena	Swae Lee; Tyla Yaweh	14,116 / 14,116	$2,094,690
October 14, 2019	New York City	United States	Madison Square Garden	Swae Lee; Tyla Yaweh	28,967 / 28,967	$4,227,339
October 15, 2019	New York City	United States	Madison Square Garden	Swae Lee; Tyla Yaweh	28,967 / 28,967	$4,227,339
October 17, 2019	Raleigh	United States	PNC Arena	Swae Lee; Tyla Yaweh	12,487 / 12,487	$1,585,642
October 18, 2019	Atlanta	United States	State Farm Arena	Swae Lee; Tyla Yaweh	19,561 / 19,561	$2,324,973
October 20, 2019	Miami	United States	American Airlines Arena	Swae Lee; Tyla Yaweh	10,623 / 10,623	$1,346,521
October 21, 2019	Sunrise	United States	BB&T Center	Swae Lee; Tyla Yaweh	9,402 / 9,402	$840,433
October 24, 2019	Tampa	United States	Amalie Arena	Swae Lee; Tyla Yaweh	13,901 / 13,901	$1,711,966
October 25, 2019	Jacksonville	United States	VyStar Veterans Memorial Arena	Swae Lee; Tyla Yaweh	11,009 / 11,009	$1,404,339
October 27, 2019 (Note: The concert of October 27, 2019, at City Park in New Orleans is part of Voodoo Music + Arts Experience.)	New Orleans	United States	City Park	—N/a	—N/a	—N/a
October 29, 2019	San Antonio	United States	AT&T Center	Swae Lee; Tyla Yaweh	13,790 / 13,790	$1,801,490
November 2, 2019 (Note: The concert of November 2, 2019, at AT&T Stadium in Arlington is part of Posty Fest.)	Arlington	United States	AT&T Stadium	Performers Meek Mill; Pharrell Williams; Rae Sremmurd; Jaden Smith; Dominic Fike; Doja Cat; Yella Beezy; Tyla Yaweh; Saint Jhn; Iann Dior; Beach Fossils; Snowy; Maj; Kerwin Frost; G-Eazy	—N/a	—N/a
November 4, 2019	Oklahoma City	United States	Chesapeake Energy Arena	Swae Lee; Tyla Yaweh	12,267 / 12,267	$1,600,637
November 5, 2019	Houston	United States	Toyota Center	Swae Lee; Tyla Yaweh	12,197 / 12,197	$1,690,741
November 8, 2019	Glendale	United States	Gila River Arena	Swae Lee; Tyla Yaweh	13,426 / 13,426	$1,772,859
November 10, 2019	Denver	United States	Pepsi Center	Swae Lee; Tyla Yaweh	13,745 / 13,745	$1,866,250
November 11, 2019	Salt Lake City	United States	Vivint Smart Home Arena	Swae Lee; Tyla Yaweh	11,754 / 11,754	$1,560,258
November 14, 2019	Oakland	United States	Oakland Arena	Swae Lee; Tyla Yaweh	13,601 / 13,601	$1,708,679
November 16, 2019	Anaheim	United States	Honda Center	Swae Lee; Tyla Yaweh	25,394 / 25,394	$2,878,617
November 17, 2019	Anaheim	United States	Honda Center	Swae Lee; Tyla Yaweh	25,394 / 25,394	$2,878,617
November 20, 2019	Inglewood	United States	The Forum	Swae Lee; Tyla Yaweh	24,985 / 24,985	$2,869,733
November 21, 2019	Inglewood	United States	The Forum	Swae Lee; Tyla Yaweh	24,985 / 24,985	$2,869,733

List of 2020 concerts, showing date, city, country, venue, opening acts, tickets sold, number of available tickets and amount of gross revenue
Date	City	Country	Venue	Opening acts	Attendance	Revenue
February 4, 2020	Omaha	United States	CHI Health Center	Swae Lee; Tyla Yaweh	14,501 / 14,501	$1,926,887
February 5, 2020	Kansas City	United States	Sprint Center	Swae Lee; Tyla Yaweh	13,406 / 13,406	$1,881,241
February 7, 2020	St. Louis	United States	Enterprise Center	Swae Lee; Tyla Yaweh	13,387 / 13,387	$1,920,408
February 9, 2020	Indianapolis	United States	Bankers Life Fieldhouse	Swae Lee; Tyla Yaweh	14,030 / 14,030	$2,093,697
February 11, 2020	Rosemont	United States	Allstate Arena	Swae Lee; Tyla Yaweh	12,716 / 12,716	$1,861,282
February 12, 2020	Grand Rapids	United States	Van Andel Arena	Swae Lee; Tyla Yaweh	10,924/ 10,924	$1,625,735
February 14, 2020	Toronto	Canada	Scotiabank Arena	Swae Lee; Tyla Yaweh	14,667 / 14,667	$1,246,500
February 16, 2020	Montreal	Canada	Bell Centre	Swae Lee; Tyla Yaweh	15,523 / 15,523	$1,692,240
February 18, 2020	Newark	United States	Prudential Center	Swae Lee; Tyla Yaweh	12,821 / 12,821	$1,873,212
February 19, 2020	Uniondale	United States	Nassau Veterans Memorial Coliseum	Swae Lee; Tyla Yaweh	11,374 / 11,374	$1,654,145
February 21, 2020	Philadelphia	United States	Wells Fargo Center	Swae Lee; Tyla Yaweh	14,862 / 14,862	$2,225,439
February 22, 2020	Hershey	United States	Giant Center	Swae Lee; Tyla Yaweh	8,767 / 8,767	$1,522,300
February 24, 2020	Pittsburgh	United States	PPG Paints Arena	Swae Lee; Tyla Yaweh	14,283 / 14,283	$2,173,510
February 27, 2020	Washington, D.C.	United States	Capital One Arena	Swae Lee; Tyla Yaweh	14,305 / 14,305	$1,982,638
February 29, 2020	Columbia	United States	Colonial Life Arena	Swae Lee; Tyla Yaweh	13,231 / 13,231	$1,895,616
March 1, 2020	Greensboro	United States	Greensboro Coliseum	Swae Lee; Tyla Yaweh	14,210 / 14,210	$1,656,401
March 3, 2020	Duluth	United States	Infinite Energy Arena	Swae Lee; Tyla Yaweh	9,482 / 9,482	$1,373,714
March 4, 2020	Nashville	United States	Bridgestone Arena	Swae Lee; Tyla Yaweh	13,838 / 13,838	$1,884,054
March 6, 2020	Memphis	United States	FedExForum	Swae Lee; Tyla Yaweh	12,737 / 12,737	$1,699,381
March 9, 2020	Houston	United States	Toyota Center	Swae Lee; Tyla Yaweh	11,914 / 11,914	$1,629,539
March 10, 2020	Austin	United States	Frank Erwin Center	Swae Lee; Tyla Yaweh	11,618 / 11,618	$1,581,477
March 12, 2020	Denver	United States	Pepsi Center	Swae Lee; Tyla Yaweh	13,102 / 13,102	$1,853,572
Totals for the tour					746,310 / 746,310 (100%)	$92,602,548

=== Cancelled shows ===
List of cancelled concerts, showing date, city, country, venue, reason for cancellation and reference
Date	City	Country	Venue	Reason	Ref.
March 14, 2020	Las Vegas	United States	MGM Grand Garden Arena	COVID-19 pandemic	
March 15, 2020	Phoenix	United States	Talking Stick Resort Arena	COVID-19 pandemic	
March 17, 2020	Ontario	United States	Toyota Arena	COVID-19 pandemic	
March 19, 2020	San Francisco	United States	Chase Center	COVID-19 pandemic	
March 21, 2020	Salt Lake City	United States	Vivint Smart Home Arena	COVID-19 pandemic	

== Accolades ==
Award	Year (Note: Indicates the year of ceremony. Each year is linked to the article about the awards held that year, wherever possible.)	Category	Result	Ref.
Pollstar Awards	2020	Best Hip-Hop/R&B Tour	Won	

== See also ==
- List of Billboard Boxscore number-one concert series of the 2020s
