= List of awards and nominations received by Post Malone =

Post Malone awards and nominations
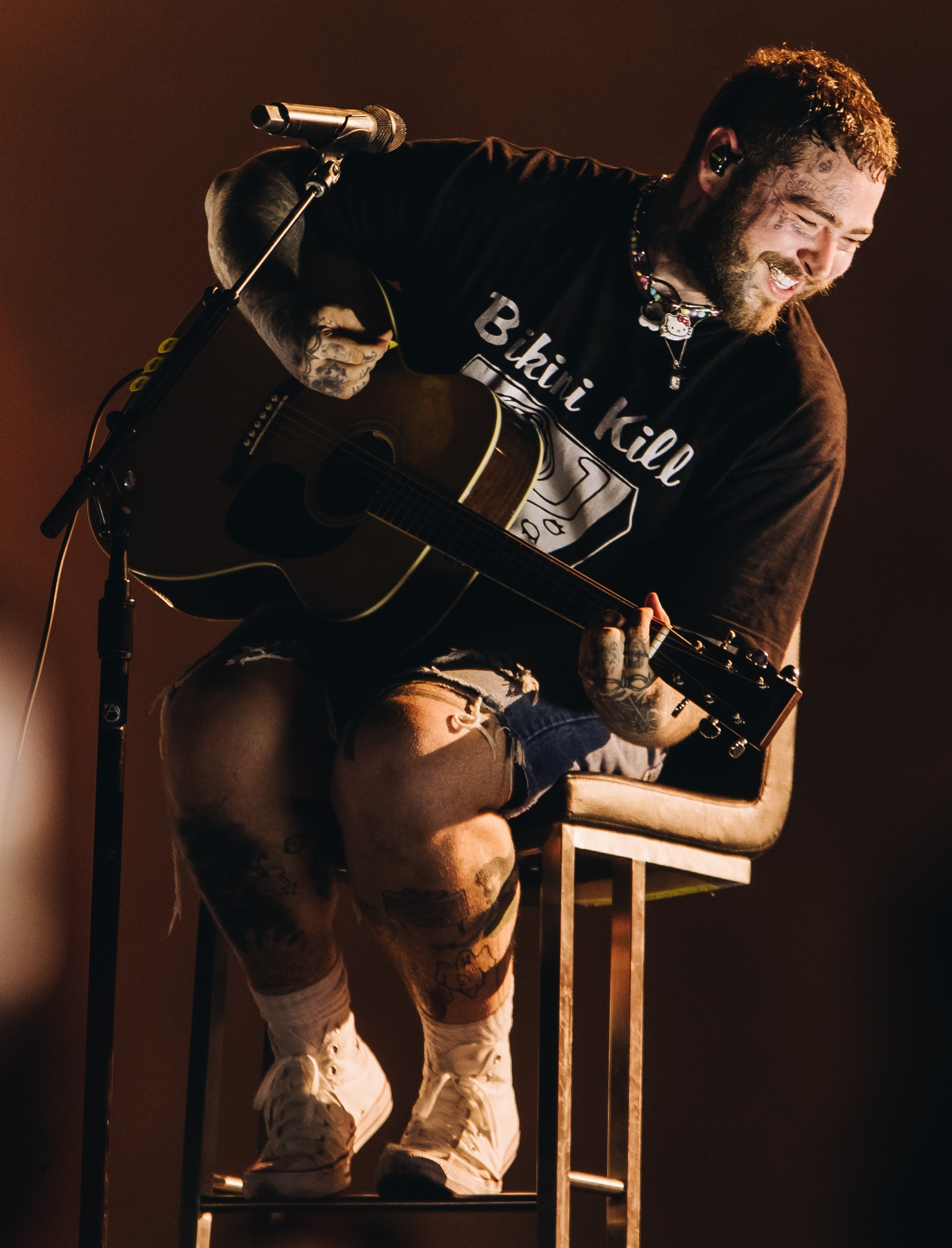
- Malone performing in 2021
Awards and nominations
Award	Wins	Nominations
American Music Awards	5	25
ASCAP Pop Music Awards	4	4
BET Hip Hop Awards	0	1
Billboard Live Music Awards	2	2
Billboard Music Awards	11	50
Country Music Association Awards	1	6
Grammy Awards	0	18
iHeartRadio Music Awards	7	25
iHeartRadio Titanium Awards	6	6
Juno Awards	1	4
MTV Europe Music Awards	1	12
MTV Video Music Awards	6	22
NRJ Awards	0	4
People's Choice Country Awards	1	4

Totals (Note: Certain award groups do not simply award one winner. They acknowledge several different recipients, have runners-up, and have third place. Since this is a specific recognition and is different from losing an award, runner-up mentions are considered wins in this award tally. For simplification and to avoid errors, each award in this list has been presumed to have had a prior nomination.)
- Wins: 58
- Nominations: 244

American musician Post Malone is the recipient of multiple awards including five American Music Awards, eleven Billboard Music Awards, six MTV Video Music Awards, seven iHeartRadio Music Awards and eighteen Grammy Awards nominations.

Post Malone received his first Grammy Award nominations at the 61st annual ceremony, with "Rockstar" being nominated for both Record of the Year and Best Rap/Sung Performance while "Better Now" garnered a nomination in Best Pop Solo Performance. Additionally, his studio album Beerbongs & Bentleys nabbed a nomination for Album of the Year. At the 62nd annual ceremony, his collaboration with Swae Lee, "Sunflower", received nominations in categories such as Record of the Year and Best Pop Duo/Group Performance.

== Awards and nominations ==
Award	Year	Recipient(s) and nominee(s)	Category	Result	Ref.
American Music Awards	2017	Himself	New Artist of the Year	Nominated	
American Music Awards	2018	Himself	Artist of the Year	Nominated	
American Music Awards	2018	Himself	Favorite Artist — Rap/Hip-Hop	Nominated	
American Music Awards	2018	Himself	Favorite Male Artist — Pop/Rock	Won	
American Music Awards	2018	Beerbongs & Bentleys	Favorite Album — Rap/Hip-Hop	Won	
American Music Awards	2018	"Rockstar" (featuring 21 Savage)	Collaboration of the Year	Nominated	
American Music Awards	2018	"Rockstar" (featuring 21 Savage)	Favorite Song — Rap/Hip-Hop	Nominated	
American Music Awards	2019	Himself	Artist of the Year	Nominated	
American Music Awards	2019	Himself	Favorite Artist - Rap/Hip-Hop	Nominated	
American Music Awards	2019	Himself	Favorite Male Artist — Pop/Rock	Nominated	
American Music Awards	2019	Hollywood's Bleeding	Favorite Album — Rap/Hip-Hop	Won	
American Music Awards	2019	"Sunflower" (with Swae Lee)	Collaboration of the Year	Nominated	
American Music Awards	2019	"Sunflower" (with Swae Lee)	Favorite Song — Pop/Rock	Nominated	
American Music Awards	2019	"Wow"	Favorite Song — Rap/Hip-Hop	Nominated	
American Music Awards	2020	Himself	Artist of the Year	Nominated	
American Music Awards	2020	Himself	Favorite Male Artist — Pop/Rock	Nominated	
American Music Awards	2020	"Circles"	Favorite Song — Pop/Rock	Nominated	
American Music Awards	2025	Himself	Artist of the Year	Nominated	
American Music Awards	2025	Himself	Favorite Country Male Artist	Won	
American Music Awards	2025	"I Had Some Help" (featuring Morgan Wallen)	Song of the Year	Nominated	
American Music Awards	2025	"I Had Some Help" (featuring Morgan Wallen)	Favorite Country Song	Won	
American Music Awards	2025	"I Had Some Help" (featuring Morgan Wallen)	Collaboration of the Year	Nominated	
American Music Awards	2025	"Fortnight" (featuring Taylor Swift)	Collaboration of the Year	Nominated	
American Music Awards	2025	F-1 Trillion	Album of the Year	Nominated	
American Music Awards	2025	F-1 Trillion	Favorite Country Album	Nominated	
APRA Music Awards	2020	"Sunflower" (with Swae Lee)	Most Performed International Work of the Year	Nominated	
ARIA Music Awards	2018	Himself	Best International Artist	Nominated	
ARIA Music Awards	2019	Himself	Best International Artist	Nominated	
ARIA Music Awards	2022	Himself	Best International Artist	Nominated	
ASCAP Pop Music Awards	2019	"Better Now"	Winning Songs	Won	
ASCAP Pop Music Awards	2019	"Psycho"	Winning Songs	Won	
ASCAP Pop Music Awards	2019	"Rockstar"	Winning Songs	Won	
ASCAP Pop Music Awards	2021	''Circles''	Song of the Year	Won	
ASCAP Rhythm & Soul Music Awards	2019	"Rockstar"	Winning Song	Won	
BBC Radio 1's Teen Awards	2019	Himself	Best International Solo Artist	Nominated	
BET Hip Hop Awards	2018	"Rockstar" (featuring 21 Savage)	Best Collabo, Duo or Group	Nominated	
Billboard Live Music Awards	2016	Purpose World Tour featuring Moxie Raia and Post Malone	Top Package	Won	
Billboard Live Music Awards	2018	Himself	Breakthrough Artist	Won	
Billboard Music Awards	2018	Himself	Top Male Artist	Nominated	
Billboard Music Awards	2018	Himself	Top Hot 100 Artist	Nominated	
Billboard Music Awards	2018	Himself	Top Song Sales Artist	Nominated	
Billboard Music Awards	2018	Himself	Top Streaming Artist	Nominated	
Billboard Music Awards	2018	Himself	Top Rap Artist	Nominated	
Billboard Music Awards	2018	Himself	Top Rap Male Artist	Nominated	
Billboard Music Awards	2018	Stoney	Top Billboard 200 Album	Nominated	
Billboard Music Awards	2018	Stoney	Top Rap Album	Nominated	
Billboard Music Awards	2018	"Rockstar" (featuring 21 Savage)	Top Hot 100 Song	Nominated	
Billboard Music Awards	2018	"Rockstar" (featuring 21 Savage)	Top Collaboration	Nominated	
Billboard Music Awards	2018	"Rockstar" (featuring 21 Savage)	Top Rap Song	Won	
Billboard Music Awards	2018	"Rockstar" (featuring 21 Savage)	Top Streaming Song (Audio)	Nominated	
Billboard Music Awards	2018	"Congratulations" (featuring Quavo)	Top Streaming Song (Audio)	Nominated	
Billboard Music Awards	2019	Himself	Top Artist	Nominated	
Billboard Music Awards	2019	Himself	Top Male Artist	Nominated	
Billboard Music Awards	2019	Himself	Top Streaming Artist	Nominated	
Billboard Music Awards	2019	Himself	Top Billboard 200 Artist	Nominated	
Billboard Music Awards	2019	Himself	Top Radio Songs Artist	Nominated	
Billboard Music Awards	2019	Himself	Top Hot 100 Artist	Nominated	
Billboard Music Awards	2019	Himself	Top Song Sales Artist	Nominated	
Billboard Music Awards	2019	Himself	Top Rap Artist	Nominated	
Billboard Music Awards	2019	Himself	Top Male Rap Artist	Nominated	
Billboard Music Awards	2019	Beerbongs & Bentleys	Top Billboard 200 Album	Nominated	
Billboard Music Awards	2019	Beerbongs & Bentleys	Top Rap Album	Nominated	
Billboard Music Awards	2019	"Better Now"	Top Hot 100 Song	Nominated	
Billboard Music Awards	2020	Himself	Top Artist	Won	
Billboard Music Awards	2020	Himself	Top Male Artist	Won	
Billboard Music Awards	2020	Himself	Top Streaming Artist	Won	
Billboard Music Awards	2020	Himself	Top Billboard 200 Artist	Won	
Billboard Music Awards	2020	Himself	Top Radio Songs Artist	Nominated	
Billboard Music Awards	2020	Himself	Top Hot 100 Artist	Won	
Billboard Music Awards	2020	Himself	Top Song Sales Artist	Nominated	
Billboard Music Awards	2020	Himself	Top Rap Artist	Won	
Billboard Music Awards	2020	Himself	Top Male Rap Artist	Won	
Billboard Music Awards	2020	Himself	Top Rap Tour	Won	
Billboard Music Awards	2020	Hollywood's Bleeding	Top Billboard 200 Album	Nominated	
Billboard Music Awards	2020	Hollywood's Bleeding	Top Rap Album	Won	
Billboard Music Awards	2020	"Sunflower" (with Swae Lee)	Top Streaming Song	Nominated	
Billboard Music Awards	2020	"Sunflower" (with Swae Lee)	Top Collaboration	Nominated	
Billboard Music Awards	2020	"Sunflower" (with Swae Lee)	Top Rap Song	Nominated	
Billboard Music Awards	2020	"Wow"	Top Rap Song	Nominated	
Billboard Music Awards	2021	Himself	Top Billboard 200 Artist	Nominated	
Billboard Music Awards	2024	Himself	Male Artist	Nominated	
Billboard Music Awards	2024	Himself	Country Artist	Nominated	
Billboard Music Awards	2024	"I Had Some Help" (featuring Morgan Wallen)	Top Collaboration	Won	
Billboard Music Awards	2024	"I Had Some Help" (featuring Morgan Wallen)	Top Country Song	Nominated	
Billboard Music Awards	2024	"I Had Some Help" (featuring Morgan Wallen)	Top Selling Song	Nominated	
Billboard Music Awards	2024	"I Had Some Help" (featuring Morgan Wallen)	Top Hot 100 Song	Nominated	
Billboard Music Awards	2024	"I Had Some Help" (featuring Morgan Wallen)	Top Streaming Song	Nominated	
Billboard Music Awards	2024	"Fortnight" (with Taylor Swift)	Top Collaboration	Nominated	
Bravo Otto	2019	Himself	Hip-Hop International	Nominated	
Camerimage	2024	"Fortnight" (featuring Taylor Swift)	Golden Frog for Best Music Video	Won	
Canadian Country Music Association Awards	2025	F-1 Trillion	Top Selling Album	Won	
Clio Awards	2019	"Sunflower" (with Swae Lee)	Animation	Bronze	
CMA Awards	2024	''I Had Some Help'' (featuring Morgan Wallen)	Song of the Year	Nominated	
CMA Awards	2024	''I Had Some Help'' (featuring Morgan Wallen)	Single of the Year	Nominated	
CMA Awards	2024	''I Had Some Help'' (featuring Morgan Wallen)	Musical Event of the Year	Nominated	
CMA Awards	2024	''I Had Some Help'' (featuring Morgan Wallen)	Video of the Year	Nominated	
CMA Awards	2025	F-1 Trillion	Album of the Year	Nominated	
CMA Awards	2025	"Pour Me a Drink" (featuring Blake Shelton)	Musical Event of the Year	Won	
Danish Music Awards	2019	Beerbongs & Bentleys	International Album of the Year	Nominated	
Danish Music Awards	2019	"Rockstar" (featuring 21 Savage)	International Hit of the Year	Nominated	
Global Awards	2018	Himself	Best RnB, Hip Hop or Grime	Nominated	
Global Awards	2019	Himself	Best Male	Nominated	
Global Awards	2020	Himself	Best RnB or Hip Hop or Grime	Nominated	
Grammy Awards	2019	"Rockstar" (featuring 21 Savage)	Record of the Year	Nominated	
Grammy Awards	2019	"Rockstar" (featuring 21 Savage)	Best Rap/Sung Performance	Nominated	
Grammy Awards	2019	Beerbongs & Bentleys	Album of the Year	Nominated	
Grammy Awards	2019	"Better Now"	Best Pop Solo Performance	Nominated	
Grammy Awards	2020	"Sunflower" (with Swae Lee)	Record of the Year	Nominated	
Grammy Awards	2020	"Sunflower" (with Swae Lee)	Best Pop Duo/Group Performance	Nominated	
Grammy Awards	2021	"Circles"	Record of the Year	Nominated	
Grammy Awards	2021	"Circles"	Song of the Year	Nominated	
Grammy Awards	2021	Hollywood's Bleeding	Album of the Year	Nominated	
Grammy Awards	2023	"I Like You (A Happier Song)" (with Doja Cat)	Best Pop Duo/Group Performance	Nominated	
Grammy Awards	2025	"Fortnight" (with Taylor Swift)	Record of the Year	Nominated	
Grammy Awards	2025	"Fortnight" (with Taylor Swift)	Song of the Year	Nominated	
Grammy Awards	2025	"Fortnight" (with Taylor Swift)	Best Music Video	Nominated	
Grammy Awards	2025	"Levii's Jeans" (with Beyoncé)	Best Pop Duo/Group Performance	Nominated	
Grammy Awards	2025	"I Had Some Help" (featuring Morgan Wallen)	Best Country Duo/Group Performance	Nominated	
Grammy Awards	2025	"I Had Some Help" (featuring Morgan Wallen)	Best Country Song	Nominated	
Grammy Awards	2025	F-1 Trillion	Best Country Album	Nominated	
Grammy Awards	2025	F-1 Trillion	Best Recording Package	Nominated	
Guild of Music Supervisors Awards	2019	"Sunflower" (with Swae Lee)	Best Song/Recording Created for a Film	Nominated	
Hungarian Music Awards	2019	Beerbongs & Bentleys	Foreign Hip-Hop Album of the Year	Nominated	
iHeartRadio Much Music Video Awards	2017	Himself	Best New International Artist	Nominated	
iHeartRadio Much Music Video Awards	2018	Himself	Artist of the Year	Nominated	
iHeartRadio Much Music Video Awards	2018	Himself	Best Hip Hop Artist or Group	Nominated	
iHeartRadio Much Music Video Awards	2018	"Rockstar" (featuring 21 Savage)	Fan Fave Single	Nominated	
iHeartRadio Music Awards	2018	"Rockstar" (featuring 21 Savage)	Hip-Hop Song of the Year	Nominated	
iHeartRadio Music Awards	2018	"Homemade Dynamite (Remix)" (with Lorde, Khalid & SZA)	Best Remix	Nominated	
iHeartRadio Music Awards	2019	Himself	Male Artist of the Year	Nominated	
iHeartRadio Music Awards	2019	Himself	Hip-Hop Artist of the Year	Nominated	
iHeartRadio Music Awards	2019	"Better Now"	Song of the Year	Nominated	
iHeartRadio Music Awards	2019	"Psycho" (featuring Ty Dolla Sign)	Hip-Hop Song of the Year	Nominated	
iHeartRadio Music Awards	2019	"Psycho" (featuring Ty Dolla Sign)	Best Music Video	Nominated	
iHeartRadio Music Awards	2020	Himself	Male Artist of the Year	Won	
iHeartRadio Music Awards	2020	Himself	Most Thumbed Up Artist of the Year	Won	
iHeartRadio Music Awards	2020	"Sunflower" (with Swae Lee)	Best Collaboration	Nominated	
iHeartRadio Music Awards	2020	"Sunflower" (with Swae Lee)	Most Thumbed Up Song of the Year	Won	
iHeartRadio Music Awards	2021	Himself	Male Artist of the Year	Nominated	
iHeartRadio Music Awards	2021	"Circles"	Song of the Year	Nominated	
iHeartRadio Music Awards	2023	"One Right Now" (with The Weeknd)	Best Collaboration	Nominated	
iHeartRadio Music Awards	2023	"I Like You (A Happier Song)" (featuring Doja Cat)	Best Collaboration	Nominated	
iHeartRadio Music Awards	2025	Himself	Artist of the Year	Nominated	
iHeartRadio Music Awards	2025	"Fortnight" (with Taylor Swift)	Best Collaboration	Nominated	
iHeartRadio Music Awards	2025	"Fortnight" (with Taylor Swift)	Best Lyrics	Won	
iHeartRadio Music Awards	2025	"Fortnight" (with Taylor Swift)	Best Music Video	Won	
iHeartRadio Music Awards	2025	"I Had Some Help" (featuring Morgan Wallen)	Song of the Year	Nominated	
iHeartRadio Music Awards	2025	"I Had Some Help" (featuring Morgan Wallen)	Best Collaboration	Nominated	
iHeartRadio Music Awards	2025	"I Had Some Help" (featuring Morgan Wallen)	Country Song of the Year	Won	
iHeartRadio Music Awards	2025	"I Had Some Help" (featuring Morgan Wallen)	Best Lyrics	Nominated	
iHeartRadio Music Awards	2025	"I Had Some Help" (featuring Morgan Wallen)	Best Music Video	Nominated	
iHeartRadio Music Awards	2025	F-1 Trillion	Album of the Year (Country)	Won	
iHeartRadio Titanium Awards	2019	"Better Now"	1 Billion Total Audience Spins on iHeartRadio Stations	Won	
iHeartRadio Titanium Awards	2019	"Psycho" (featuring Ty Dolla Sign)	1 Billion Total Audience Spins on iHeartRadio Stations	Won	
iHeartRadio Titanium Awards	2019	"Rockstar" (featuring 21 Savage)	1 Billion Total Audience Spins on iHeartRadio Stations	Won	
iHeartRadio Titanium Awards	2020	"Sunflower" (with Swae Lee)	1 Billion Total Audience Spins on iHeartRadio Stations	Won	
iHeartRadio Titanium Awards	2020	"Wow"	1 Billion Total Audience Spins on iHeartRadio Stations	Won	
iHeartRadio Titanium Awards	2020	"Circles"	1 Billion Total Audience Spins on iHeartRadio Stations	Won	
Juno Awards	2018	Stoney	International Album of the Year	Nominated	
Juno Awards	2019	Beerbongs & Bentleys	International Album of the Year	Won	
Juno Awards	2019	"Jackie Chan" (with Tiësto, Dzeko & Preme)	Dance Recording of the Year	Nominated	
Juno Awards	2020	Hollywood's Bleeding	International Album of the Year	Nominated	
LOS40 Music Awards	2018	Himself	International New Artist of the Year	Nominated	
LOS40 Music Awards	2018	Beerbongs & Bentleys	International Album of the Year	Nominated	
Melon Music Awards	2019	"Sunflower" (with Swae Lee)	Best OST	Nominated	
Melon Music Awards	2023	Himself	Best Pop Artist	Nominated	
MTV Europe Music Awards	2017	Himself	Best Hip-Hop	Nominated	
MTV Europe Music Awards	2018	Himself	Best Artist	Nominated	
MTV Europe Music Awards	2018	Himself	Best Look	Nominated	
MTV Europe Music Awards	2018	Himself	Best US Act	Nominated	
MTV Europe Music Awards	2018	"Rockstar" (featuring 21 Savage)	Best Song	Nominated	
MTV Europe Music Awards	2018	Wireless Festival	Best World Stage	Nominated	
MTV Europe Music Awards	2019	"Sunflower" (with Swae Lee)	Best Song	Nominated	
MTV Europe Music Awards	2020	"Nirvana Tribute"	Best Virtual Live	Nominated	
MTV Europe Music Awards	2022	"I Like You (A Happier Song)" (featuring Doja Cat)	Best Collaboration	Nominated	
MTV Europe Music Awards	2024	"Fortnight" (with Taylor Swift)	Best Collaboration	Nominated	
MTV Europe Music Awards	2024	"Fortnight" (with Taylor Swift)	Best Video	Won	
MTV Europe Music Awards	2024	Himself	Best Artist	Nominated	
MTV Millennial Awards Brazil	2020	"Circles"	Global Hit	Nominated	
MTV Video Music Awards	2018	Himself	Artist of the Year	Nominated	
MTV Video Music Awards	2018	"Rockstar" (featuring 21 Savage)	Song of the Year	Won	
MTV Video Music Awards	2018	"Better Now"	Song of Summer	Nominated	
MTV Video Music Awards	2019	"Goodbyes" (featuring Young Thug)	Song of Summer	Nominated	
MTV Video Music Awards	2020	Himself	Artist of the Year	Nominated	
MTV Video Music Awards	2020	"Circles"	Song of the Year	Nominated	
MTV Video Music Awards	2020	Nirvana Tribute	Best Quarantine Performance	Nominated	
MTV Video Music Awards	2022	"One Right Now" (with the Weeknd)	Best Collaboration	Nominated	
MTV Video Music Awards	2022	"I Like You (A Happier Song)" (featuring Doja Cat)	Song of Summer	Nominated	
MTV Video Music Awards	2023	"I Like You (A Happier Song)" (featuring Doja Cat)	Best Collaboration	Nominated	
MTV Video Music Awards	2024	"Fortnight" (with Taylor Swift)	Video of the Year	Won	
MTV Video Music Awards	2024	"Fortnight" (with Taylor Swift)	Song of the Year	Nominated	
MTV Video Music Awards	2024	"Fortnight" (with Taylor Swift)	Song of Summer	Won	
MTV Video Music Awards	2024	"Fortnight" (with Taylor Swift)	Best Collaboration	Won	
MTV Video Music Awards	2024	"Fortnight" (with Taylor Swift)	Best Direction	Won	
MTV Video Music Awards	2024	"Fortnight" (with Taylor Swift)	Best Cinematography	Nominated	
MTV Video Music Awards	2024	"Fortnight" (with Taylor Swift)	Best Editing	Won	
MTV Video Music Awards	2024	"Fortnight" (with Taylor Swift)	Best Visual Effects	Nominated	
MTV Video Music Awards	2024	"Fortnight" (with Taylor Swift)	Best Art Direction	Nominated	
MTV Video Music Awards	2024	"I Had Some Help" (featuring Morgan Wallen)	Best Collaboration	Nominated	
MTV Video Music Awards	2024	"I Had Some Help" (featuring Morgan Wallen)	Song of Summer	Nominated	
MTV Video Music Awards	2025	"Pour Me a Drink" (featuring Blake Shelton)	Best Collaboration	Nominated	
MTV Video Play Awards	2018	"Psycho" (featuring Ty Dolla Sign)	Winning Video	Won	
MTV Video Play Awards	2019	"Sunflower" (with Swae Lee)	Winning Video	Won	
Myx Music Awards	2024	"Fortnight" (featuring Taylor Swift)	Global Video of the Year	Nominated	
NetEase Annual Music Awards	2024	"Fortnight" (featuring Taylor Swift)	Top English Single	Won	
New Music Awards	2023	Himself and Doja Cat	TOP40 Group of the Year	Won	
Nickelodeon Kids' Choice Awards	2019	Himself	Favorite Breakout Artist	Nominated	
Nickelodeon Kids' Choice Awards	2020	Himself	Favorite Male Artist	Nominated	
Nickelodeon Kids' Choice Awards	2020	"Sunflower" (with Swae Lee)	Favorite Music Collaboration	Nominated	
Nickelodeon Kids' Choice Awards	2021	Himself	Favorite Male Artist	Nominated	
Nickelodeon Kids' Choice Awards	2023	Himself	Favorite Male Artist	Nominated	
Nickelodeon Kids' Choice Awards	2023	''I Like You (A Happier Song)'' (with Doja Cat)	Favorite Music Collaboration	Nominated	
Nickelodeon Kids' Choice Awards	2024	Himself	Favorite Male Artist	Won	
Nickelodeon Kids' Choice Awards	2024	"Fortnight" (featuring Taylor Swift)	Favorite Music Collaboration	Nominated	
Nickelodeon Kids' Choice Awards	2025	F-1 Trillion	Favorite Album	Nominated	
Nickelodeon Kids' Choice Awards	2025	Himself	Favorite Male Artist	Nominated	
NRJ Music Awards	2018	Himself	International Breakthrough of the Year	Nominated	
NRJ Music Awards	2019	Himself	International Male Artist of the Year	Nominated	
NRJ Music Awards	2024	"Fortnight" (with Taylor Swift)	International Collaboration/Duo of the Year	Nominated	
NRJ Music Awards	2024	Himself	International Male Artist of the Year	Nominated	
People's Choice Awards	2019	Himself	Male Artist of 2019	Nominated	
People's Choice Awards	2024	Himself	Male Artist of 2024	Nominated	
People's Choice Awards	2024	Himself	Hip-Hop Artist of 2024	Nominated	
People's Choice Country Awards	2024	"I Had Some Help" (featuring Morgan Wallen)	Song of the Year	Won	
People's Choice Country Awards	2024	"I Had Some Help" (featuring Morgan Wallen)	Music Video of the Year	Nominated	
People's Choice Country Awards	2024	"I Had Some Help" (featuring Morgan Wallen)	Crossover Song of the Year	Nominated	
People's Choice Country Awards	2024	"Pour Me a Drink" (featuring Blake Shelton)	Music Video of the Year	Nominated	
Pollstar Awards	2020	Beerbongs & Bentleys Tour and Runaway Tour	Best Hip-Hop/R&B Tour	Won	
Pollstar Awards	2023	Twelve Carat Tour	Best Hip-Hop Tour	Won	
Pollstar Awards	2024	''If Y’all Weren’t Here, I’d Be Crying'' Tour	Best Hip-Hop Tour	Won	
Rockbjörnen	2018	"Rockstar" (featuring 21 Savage)	Foreign Song of the Year	Nominated	
Rockbjörnen	2019	"Wow"	Foreign Song of the Year	Nominated	
Set Decorators Society of America Awards	2024	"Fortnight" (with Taylor Swift)	Best Achievement in Decor/Design of a Short Format: Webseries, Music Video or Commercial	Won	
Teen Choice Awards	2018	Himself	Choice Artist: R&B/Hip-Hop	Nominated	
Teen Choice Awards	2019	Himself	Choice Male Artist	Nominated	
Teen Choice Awards	2019	Himself	Choice Artist: R&B/Hip-Hop	Nominated	
Teen Choice Awards	2019	"Wow"	Choice Song: Male Artist	Nominated	
Teen Choice Awards	2019	"Wow"	Choice Song: R&B/Hip-Hop	Nominated	
Teen Choice Awards	2019	"Sunflower" (with Swae Lee)	Choice Song: R&B/Hip-Hop	Nominated	
Teen Choice Awards	2019	"Sunflower" (with Swae Lee)	Choice Song From a Movie	Nominated	
Urban Music Awards	2018	Himself	Best International Artist 2018	Nominated	
Urban Music Awards	2018	Himself	Artist of the Year (USA)	Nominated	
Webby Awards	2019	Post Malone pranks people with undercover record store surprise	Video – Viral	Nominated	
ZD Awards	2018	Himself	Best Foreign Act	Nominated	
