= Talk to Me Nice (disambiguation) =

"Talk to Me Nice" is a 2023 song by Tinashe.

Talk to Me Nice may also refer to:

- "Talk to Me Nice", a song by Lil Yachty from Lil Boat 2, 2018
- "Talk to Me Nice", a song by The Game from Drillmatic – Heart vs. Mind, 2022
- "Talk to Me Nice", a song by Tech Panda & Kenzani, 2023
- "Talk to Me Nice", a song by Psychic Fever from Exile Tribe, 2024
