= Brian Lee (songwriter) =

American songwriter

Brian Dong Ho Lee (c. 1981) is an American songwriter. He has co-written hits such as "Work from Home" by Fifth Harmony, "Let Me Love You" by DJ Snake and Justin Bieber, "Havana" by Camila Cabello, and "Goodbyes" by Post Malone. Lee also co-wrote "Wolves" by Selena Gomez and Marshmello and "Good Time" by Owl City and Carly Rae Jepsen, and contributed to Lady Gaga's 2011 Born This Way album, co-writing "Americano" and providing back-up vocals on "Government Hooker".

Born in Michigan and raised in Queens, New York City, Lee was trained as a classical violinist from the age of 3. He got his start in pop music with a Chicago-area band he formed called Made In Hollywood. Following the dissolution of Made In Hollywood, Lee joined the band the White Tie Affair for a short period of time.

Lee is also a producer, and has co-produced "All Night" by Icona Pop as well as the aforementioned "Goodbyes" by Post Malone. On April 24, 2020, during the COVID-19 pandemic, Lee was featured as the bassist during Post Malone's well-received Nirvana tribute show and fundraiser for the WHO COVID-19 Solidarity Response Fund.

== Songwriting discography ==
Year	Artist	Song	Album
2011	Lady Gaga	"Americano"	Born This Way
2012	Owl City & Carly Rae Jepsen	"Good Time"	The Midsummer Station and Kiss
2012	Owl City	"When Can I See You Again?"	The Midsummer Station
2012	Owl City	"I'm Coming After You"	The Midsummer Station
2012	Cassie	"Gimme That"	Non-album single
2012	Cross Gene	"One Way Love"	Timeless: Begins
2012	Girls' Generation	"The Great Escape Remix"	Non-album single
2013	Icona Pop	"All Night"	This Is... Icona Pop
2013	Selena Gomez	"The Lover In Me"	Stars Dance
2013	Ingrid Michaelson	"Afterlife"	Lights Out
2013	Michael Franti	"I Don't Wanna Go"	All People
2013	Michael Franti	"Wherever You Are "	All People
2013	Relient K	"Can't Complain"	Collapsible Lung
2013	Relient K	"That's My Jam"	Collapsible Lung
2013	Dev	"Kiss It"	Non-album single
2013	Hitomi	"Down For You"	Non-album single
2013	Daichi Miura	"Half of You"	Non-album single
2013	Sinead Burgess	"Rearviewmirror"	Non-album single
2014	Hyuna	"French Kiss"	A Talk
2014	Ricki-Lee Coulter	"Diva"	Dance in the Rain
2014	Ricki-Lee Coulter	"In The Mood"	Dance in the Rain
2014	Ricki-Lee Coulter	"Only You"	Dance in the Rain
2014	Mike Stud	"I'm Not Sorry"	Closer
2014	Andrew McMahon in the Wilderness	"All Our Lives"	Andrew McMahon in the Wilderness
2015	B2ST	"Can't Wait To Love You"	GUESS WHO?
2015	SNBRN	"Beat the Sunrise (feat. Andrew Watt)"	Non-album single
2015	Strange Talk	"When It Feels So Good"	E.V.O.L.U.T.I.O.N
2015	Andrew Watt	"High"	Ghost In My Head
2015	Conrad Sewell	"Hold Me Up"	All I Know
2015	Justin Bieber	"Hit The Ground"	Purpose
2016	Fifth Harmony	"Work from Home"	7/27
2016	DJ Snake	"Let Me Love You"	Encore
2017	Watt	"Burning Man (feat. Post Malone)"	Non-album single
2017	Kygo & Selena Gomez	"It Ain't Me"	Stargazing
2017	Ten	"夢中夢 (몽중몽; Dream In A Dream)"	Non-album single
2017	G-Dragon	"Outro. 신곡 神曲 Divina Commedia"	Kwon Ji Yong
2017	Avicii	"Lonely Together (feat. Rita Ora)"	Avīci (01)
2017	Camila Cabello	"Havana (feat. Young Thug)"	Camila
2017	Hailee Steinfeld & Alesso	"Let Me Go (feat. Florida Georgia Line & watt)"	Non-album single
2017	Rita Ora	"Anywhere"	Phoenix
2017	Selena Gomez & Marshmello	"Wolves"	Rare
2017	Camila Cabello	"Real Friends"	Camila
2018	Rita Ora	"Girls"	Phoenix
2018	Zayn & Nicki Minaj	"No Candle No Light"	Icarus Falls
2019	Blackpink	"Don't Know What To Do"	Kill This Love
2019	Martin Garrix	"Summer Days (feat. Macklemore & Patrick Stump)"	Non-album single
2019	Post Malone	"Goodbyes (feat. Young Thug)"	Hollywood's Bleeding
2019	Post Malone	"Hollywood's Bleeding"	Hollywood's Bleeding
2019	Post Malone	"Allergic"	Hollywood's Bleeding
2019	Jessi	Who Dat B	Nuna
2020	Blink-182	"Quarantine"	Non-album single
2020	Blackpink	"Lovesick Girls"	The Album
2021	Rosé	"Gone"	R
2021	Monsta X	"About Last Night"	The Dreaming
2022	Kang Daniel	"Loser (feat. Dbo)"	The Story
2022	Blackpink	"Tally"	Born Pink
2023	Blink-182	"Turn This Off!"	One More Time...
2023	Blink-182	"When We Were Young"	One More Time...
2023	Blink-182	"Childhood"	One More Time...
2024	jxdn	"When the Music Stops"	When the Music Stops
2024	jxdn	"Just Let Go"	When the Music Stops
2024	Blink-182	"Take Me In"	One More Time... Part-2
2024	Woosung	"44 (Forget Forever)"	4444
2024	Woosung	"Happy Alone"	4444
2024	Woosung	"Paper Cuts"	4444
2024	Woosung	"Found You"	4444
2024	Woosung	"Before We Die"	4444
2025	Zhao Lusi	"Black Veil Bride"	Black Veil Bride
2025	Zhao Lusi	"Don't Wanna Know"	Black Veil Bride
2026	Goldfinger	"Chasing Amy"	Nine Lives
2026	Goldfinger	"Last One Standing"	Nine Lives
2026	Goldfinger	"Derelict"	Nine Lives
2026	Goldfinger	"John Lennon"	Nine Lives
2026	Goldfinger	"Dynamite"	Nine Lives
2026	Goldfinger	"Killswitch"	Nine Lives
2026	Goldfinger	"The Punisher"	Nine Lives
