= Goodbyes (Post Malone song) =

2019 single by Post Malone featuring Young Thug

Single by Post Malone featuring Young Thug

from the album Hollywood's Bleeding
- Released: July 5, 2019
- Genre: Pop-trap
- Length: 2:54
- Label: Republic
- Songwriters: Austin Post; Jeffery Williams; Louis Bell; Brian Lee; William Walsh; Val Blavatnik; Jessie Foutz
- Producers: Brian Lee; Louis Bell

Post Malone singles chronology
"Wow" (2018)	"Goodbyes" (2019)	"Circles" (2019)

Young Thug singles chronology
"The London" (2019)	"Goodbyes" (2019)	"Old Town Road (Remix)" (2019)

Music videos
- "Goodbyes" (Rated R) on YouTube; "Goodbyes" (Rated PG) on YouTube

"Goodbyes" is a song by American rapper and singer Post Malone featuring fellow American rapper and singer Young Thug. It was released as the second single from the former's third studio album, Hollywood's Bleeding, via Republic Records on July 5, 2019, one day after Malone's 24th birthday. The song was written by the artists, Billy Walsh, Val Blavatnik, Jessie Foutz, and producers Brian Lee & Louis Bell It became Malone's seventh top 10 on the US Billboard Hot 100, as well as his sixth number-one on Billboard's Rhythmic chart. Along with "Sunflower" and "Wow", Malone achieved three consecutive US Rhythmic No. 1s to come from one album (Hollywood's Bleeding), and was the first time the feat was achieved after Drake's Scorpion spawned three chart leaders in 2018.

== Composition ==
The song talks about the end of a relationship, and was called "melodic" by Rap-Up, on which Post Malone sings the chorus: "I want you out of my head / I want you out of my bedroom tonight / There's no way I could save you / 'Cause I need to be saved too / I'm no good at goodbyes."

== Promotion ==
Post Malone announced the track and its feature and release date on social media on July 1, 2019, sharing an image styled like a film poster for the song, featuring the tagline "Too Much Pleasure Is Pain", a line from the song. He then revealed the cover art of the song on social media on July 2. He then posted a snippet of the beginning of the video of him being stabbed and killed by the enemy team on July 3. The music video was published on the day of the song's release on July 5 and the lyric video was published three days after on July 8.

== Music video ==
The original "R" rated music video was released alongside the song on July 5, and directed by Colin Tilley. It features Malone playing a gang member who dies after being repeatedly stabbed in graphic fashion by a member of a rival gang, before rising from the dead in a graveyard. Young Thug and actress Kathryn Newton also appear in the video. A "PG" version was released on July 7 which omits the graphic sequence. The "R" and "PG" rated music videos have over 316 million and 174 million views respectively, as of July 2023.

== Personnel ==
Credits adapted from Post Malone's Twitter and Tidal.

- Post Malone – principal vocalist, songwriting
- Young Thug – featured vocalist, songwriting
- Brian Lee – production, programming, all instrumentation, songwriting
- Louis Bell – production, recording, vocal production, programming, all instrumentation, songwriting
- Billy Walsh – songwriting
- Val Blavatnik – songwriting
- Jessie Foutz – songwriting
- Manny Marroquin – mixing
- Chris Galland – mixing assistant
- Robin Florent – mixing assistant
- Scott Desmarais – mixing assistant
- Jeremie Inhaber – mixing assistant
- Mike Bozzi – mastering
- Travis Brothers – design
- Bryan Rivera – design
- Collin Fletcher – design
- Anton Reva – design

== Awards and nominations ==
Year	Ceremony	Category	Result	Ref.
2019	MTV Video Music Awards	Song of Summer	Nominated	

== Charts ==
=== Weekly charts ===
Weekly chart performance for "Goodbyes"
Chart (2019)	Peak position
Australia (ARIA)	5
Austria (Ö3 Austria Top 40)	8
Belgium (Ultratop 50 Flanders)	22
Belgium (Ultratip Bubbling Under Wallonia)	1
Bolivia (Monitor Latino)	16
Canada Hot 100 (Billboard)	5
Canada CHR/Top 40 (Billboard)	12
Canada Hot AC (Billboard)	47
Czech Republic Airplay (ČNS IFPI)	35
Czech Republic Singles Digital (ČNS IFPI)	6
Denmark (Tracklisten)	7
Estonia (Eesti Tipp-40)	4
Finland (Suomen virallinen lista)	4
France (SNEP)	47
Germany (GfK)	16
Hungary (Single Top 40)	5
Hungary (Stream Top 40)	3
Ireland (IRMA)	4
Italy (FIMI)	41
Latvia (LAIPA)	2
Lithuania (AGATA)	3
Malaysia (RIM)	3
Mexico Airplay (Billboard)	28
Netherlands (Dutch Top 40)	16
Netherlands (Single Top 100)	5
New Zealand (Recorded Music NZ)	5
Norway (VG-lista)	6
Portugal (AFP)	4
Romania (Airplay 100)	17
Scottish Singles Sales (Official Charts)	13
Singapore (RIAS)	4
Slovakia Airplay (ČNS IFPI)	82
Slovakia Singles Digital (ČNS IFPI)	2
South Korea (Gaon)	157
Spain (Promusicae)	85
Sweden (Sverigetopplistan)	4
Switzerland (Schweizer Hitparade)	12
UK Singles (Official Charts)	5
US Billboard Hot 100	3
US Adult Pop Airplay (Billboard)	30
US Dance Airplay (Billboard)	5
US Hot R&B/Hip-Hop Songs (Billboard)	2
US Pop Airplay (Billboard)	4
US Rhythmic Airplay (Billboard)	1
US Rolling Stone Top 100	1

=== Year-end charts ===
Year-end chart performance for "Goodbyes"
Chart (2019)	Position
Australia (ARIA)	35
Austria (Ö3 Austria Top 40)	51
Belgium (Ultratop Flanders)	95
Canada (Canadian Hot 100)	32
Denmark (Tracklisten)	61
Germany (Official German Charts)	90
Iceland (Tónlistinn)	85
Latvia (LAIPA)	40
Netherlands (Dutch Top 40)	63
Netherlands (Single Top 100)	34
New Zealand (Recorded Music NZ)	41
Norway (VG-lista)	38
Portugal (AFP)	39
Romania (Airplay 100)	90
Sweden (Sverigetopplistan)	69
Switzerland (Schweizer Hitparade)	60
UK Singles (Official Charts Company)	79
US Billboard Hot 100	30
US Dance/Mix Show Airplay (Billboard)	33
US Hot R&B/Hip-Hop Songs (Billboard)	13
US Mainstream Top 40 (Billboard)	23
US Rhythmic (Billboard)	16
US Rolling Stone Top 100	30

== Certifications ==
Certifications for "Goodbyes"
Region	Certification	Certified units/sales
Australia (ARIA)	6× Platinum	420,000^{‡}
Belgium (BRMA)	Gold	20,000^{‡}
Brazil (Pro-Música Brasil)	2× Diamond	320,000^{‡}
Canada (Music Canada)	7× Platinum	560,000^{‡}
Denmark (IFPI Danmark)	Platinum	90,000^{‡}
France (SNEP)	Platinum	200,000^{‡}
Germany (BVMI)	Gold	200,000^{‡}
Italy (FIMI)	Platinum	70,000^{‡}
New Zealand (RMNZ)	3× Platinum	90,000^{‡}
Poland (ZPAV)	Platinum	50,000^{‡}
Portugal (AFP)	2× Platinum	20,000^{‡}
Spain (Promusicae)	Gold	30,000^{‡}
United Kingdom (BPI)	Platinum	600,000^{‡}
United States (RIAA)	3× Platinum	3,000,000^{‡}
^{‡} Sales+streaming figures based on certification alone.

== Release history ==
Region	Date	Format	Label	Ref.
Various	July 5, 2019	Digital download; streaming	Republic	
United States	July 9, 2019	Rhythmic contemporary	Republic	
Various	October 1, 2019	7-inch single; 12-inch single; CD single; Cassette single	Republic	
