= Allergic (song) =

2019 single by Post Malone

Single by Post Malone

from the album Hollywood's Bleeding
- Released: September 24, 2019
- Studio: Electric Feel
- Genre: Indie rock; pop
- Length: 2:36
- Label: Republic
- Songwriters: Austin Post; Louis Bell; Brian Lee; William Walsh; Dylan Cooper
- Producers: Brian Lee; Louis Bell

Post Malone singles chronology
"Enemies" (2019)	"Allergic" (2019)	"Writing on the Wall" (2019)

"Allergic" is a song by American musician Post Malone. It was sent to alternative radio as the fifth single from Post Malone's third studio album, Hollywood's Bleeding on September 24, 2019. The song was written by Malone alongside Billy Walsh and producers Louis Bell and Brian Lee.

The song peaked at number 37 on the US Billboard Hot 100.

== Critical reception ==
In a positive review, Max Sea from GQ called the song his favorite off the album, stating that all of the track's sporadic elements manage to work just right. Will Schube from Billboard ranked the song 14th, out of the 17 tracks on the album, in terms of the best to worst tracks, criticizing the lack of depthness in the song's lyrics.

== Personnel ==
Credits adapted from Tidal.

- Post Malone – principal vocalist, songwriting
- Brian Lee – production, programming, songwriting
- Louis Bell – production, recording, vocal production, programming, songwriting
- Kelsey Silva
- Billy Walsh – songwriting
- Simon Todkill – recording
- Manny Marroquin – mixing
- Chris Galland – mixing assistant
- Robin Florent – mixing assistant
- Scott Desmarais – mixing assistant
- Jeremie Inhaber – mixing assistant

== Charts ==
Chart (2019)	Peak position
Australia (ARIA)	45
Canada Hot 100 (Billboard)	39
Czech Republic Singles Digital (ČNS IFPI)	59
Hungary (Stream Top 40)	36
Italy (FIMI)	99
Lithuania (AGATA)	64
Netherlands (Single Top 100)	56
Norway (VG-lista)	28
Portugal (AFP)	69
Slovakia Singles Digital (ČNS IFPI)	40
Sweden (Sverigetopplistan)	55
UK Audio Streaming (OCC)	50
US Billboard Hot 100	37
US Alternative Airplay (Billboard)	33
US Rolling Stone Top 100	14

== Certifications ==
Region	Certification	Certified units/sales
Australia (ARIA)	Gold	35,000^{‡}
Brazil (Pro-Música Brasil)	Gold	20,000^{‡}
Canada (Music Canada)	Platinum	80,000^{‡}
United States (RIAA)	Platinum	1,000,000^{‡}
^{‡} Sales+streaming figures based on certification alone.

== Release history ==
Country	Date	Format	Label	Ref.
Various	September 6, 2019	Digital download; streaming	Republic	
United States	September 24, 2019	Alternative radio	Republic	
