= Saint-Tropez (song) =

2019 song by Post Malone

Song by Post Malone

from the album Hollywood's Bleeding
- Released: September 6, 2019
- Genre: Pop-trap
- Length: 2:30
- Label: Republic
- Songwriters: Austin Post; Adam Feeney; Jahaan Sweet; Billy Walsh; Paimon Jahanbin; Nima Jahanbin; Louis Bell
- Producers: Dukes; Sweet; Wallis Lane

Music video
- "Saint-Tropez" on YouTube

"Saint-Tropez" is a song by American musician Post Malone from his third studio album, Hollywood's Bleeding (2019). Its name is taken from the French town of Saint-Tropez. It was written alongside Louis Bell, Billy Walsh, and producers Frank Dukes, Jahaan Sweet, & Wallis Lane (Nima Jahanbin, Paimon Jahanbin).

The song peaked at number 18 on the US Billboard Hot 100 songs chart. The title refers to the French beach town Saint-Tropez, where the protagonist in the song claims to be.

== Critical reception ==
Will Schube from Billboard ranked the track, 16th, out of the 17 songs on the album, in terms of the best records on the project, complimenting Malone's vocals but criticizing the weakness and genericism of the track's lyrics.

== Lyrics ==
Mikael Wood from the Los Angeles Times described the song's lyrics as being about Post Malone's material comforts and the lack of fulfilling feelings like joy that he's unable to have with them.

== Music video ==
The music video for the song was released on September 11, 2019. It was filmed in the mountains of Cottonwood Heights, Utah and the town of Saint-Tropez in the French Riviera and was directed by Chris Villa. Various luxury vehicles such as the Bugatti, McLaren and Rolls-Royce are featured in the clip.

== Personnel ==
Credits adapted from Tidal.

- Post Malone – principal vocalist, songwriting
- Louis Bell – recording, songwriting, vocal production
- Frank Dukes – production, songwriting, programming
- Jahaan Sweet – production, songwriting, programming
- Wallis Lane – production, songwriting, programming
- Billy Walsh – songwriting
- Manny Marroquin – mixing
- Chris Galland – mixing assistance
- Robin Florent – mixing assistance
- Scott Desmarais – mixing assistance
- Jeremie Inhaber – mixing assistance

== Charts ==
Chart performance for "Saint-Tropez"
Chart (2019)	Peak position
Australia (ARIA)	19
Austria (Ö3 Austria Top 40)	28
Canada Hot 100 (Billboard)	10
Czech Republic Singles Digital (ČNS IFPI)	11
Denmark (Tracklisten)	15
Finland (Suomen virallinen lista)	16
France (SNEP)	103
Germany (GfK)	43
Hungary (Stream Top 40)	9
Ireland (IRMA)	12
Italy (FIMI)	46
Latvia (LAIPA)	10
Lithuania (AGATA)	9
Malaysia (RIM)	18
Netherlands (Single Top 100)	23
New Zealand (Recorded Music NZ)	17
Norway (VG-lista)	8
Portugal (AFP)	28
Singapore (RIAS)	17
Slovakia Singles Digital (ČNS IFPI)	6
Sweden (Sverigetopplistan)	10
Switzerland (Schweizer Hitparade)	29
UK Singles (OCC)	52
US Billboard Hot 100	18
US Hot R&B/Hip-Hop Songs (Billboard)	10
US Rolling Stone Top 100	5

== Certifications ==
Region	Certification	Certified units/sales
Australia (ARIA)	Platinum	70,000^{‡}
Brazil (Pro-Música Brasil)	3× Platinum	120,000^{‡}
Canada (Music Canada)	2× Platinum	160,000^{‡}
Denmark (IFPI Danmark)	Gold	45,000^{‡}
New Zealand (RMNZ)	Platinum	30,000^{‡}
Portugal (AFP)	Gold	5,000^{‡}
United Kingdom (BPI)	Silver	200,000^{‡}
United States (RIAA)	Platinum	1,000,000^{‡}
^{‡} Sales+streaming figures based on certification alone.

== Release history ==
Country	Date	Format	Label	Ref.
Various	September 6, 2019	Digital download; streaming	Republic	
