= Die for Me (Post Malone song) =

2019 song by Post Malone featuring Future and Halsey

Song by Post Malone featuring Future and Halsey

from the album Hollywood's Bleeding
- Genre: Pop-trap
- Length: 4:05
- Label: Republic
- Songwriters: Austin Post; Nayvadius Wilburn; Ashley Frangipane; Andrew Watt; Louis Bell; Nathan Perez; Billy Walsh
- Producers: Louis Bell; Andrew Watt; Happy Perez

Audio video
- "Die for Me" on YouTube

"Die for Me" is a song by American musician Post Malone featuring American rapper Future and American singer Halsey from the former's third studio album Hollywood's Bleeding (2019). It was written alongside Billy Walks and producers Andrew Watt, Louis Bell, and Happy Perez.

== Charts ==
Chart performance for "Die for Me"
Chart (2019)	Peak position
Australia (ARIA)	23
Canada Hot 100 (Billboard)	21
Denmark (Tracklisten)	30
France (SNEP)	193
Greece (IFPI)	26
Italy (FIMI)	63
Lithuania (AGATA)	40
Netherlands (Single Top 100)	38
Norway (VG-lista)	21
Portugal (AFP)	43
Sweden (Sverigetopplistan)	39
US Billboard Hot 100	20
US Hot Rap Songs (Billboard)	9
US Hot R&B/Hip-Hop Songs (Billboard)	11

== Certifications ==
Certifications for "Die for Me"
Region	Certification	Certified units/sales
Australia (ARIA)	Platinum	70,000^{‡}
Brazil (Pro-Música Brasil)	Platinum	40,000^{‡}
Canada (Music Canada)	2× Platinum	160,000^{‡}
New Zealand (RMNZ)	Gold	15,000^{‡}
United Kingdom (BPI)	Silver	200,000^{‡}
United States (RIAA)	4× Platinum	4,000,000^{‡}
^{‡} Sales+streaming figures based on certification alone.

== "Die 4 Me" ==
"Die 4 Me"

Single by Halsey
- Released: February 24, 2023
- Length: 3:35
- Label: Capitol
- Songwriters: Ashley Frangipane; Andrew Watt; Billy Walsh; Nathan Perez; Austin Post; Nayvadius Wilburn; Benjamin Levin; Magnus August Høiberg; Louis Bell
- Producers: Andrew Watt; Louis Bell; Happy Perez; Benny Blanco; Cashmere Cat

Halsey singles chronology
"Stay with Me" (2022)	"Die 4 Me" (2023)	"Lilith (Diablo IV Anthem)" (2022)

Music video
- "Die 4 Me" on YouTube

"Die 4 Me" is Halsey's reworking of the original song with Post Malone and Future. It was released as a single through Capitol Records on February 24, 2023. The song was written and produced with additions from Benny Blanco and Cashmere Cat.

=== Composition and lyrics ===
"Die 4 Me" contains two new verses containing similar themes of Halsey's original verse on "Die For Me", which is also included with slight adjustments. For example, the line "I sold fifteen million copies of a break-up note", referring to Halsey's largest song "Without Me", is updated to forty million copies.

=== Background ===
Halsey had been performing her original verse of "Die For Me" on the Love and Power Tour, responding to fan demand for the full release of a demo of the song with only herself. She then began teasing its release on social media leading up to it. In a post she said, "Big big thanks to Post Malone, Louis Bell, and Future for having me on the original release and co-signing this version finally seeing daylight."

=== Charts ===
Weekly chart performance for "Die 4 Me"
Chart (2023)	Peak position
Canada CHR/Top 40 (Billboard)	48
Global 200 (Billboard)	196
Ireland (IRMA)	68
New Zealand Hot Singles (RMNZ)	11
UK Singles (Official Charts)	85
US Billboard Hot 100	100
US Pop Airplay (Billboard)	27
