= Enemies (Post Malone song) =

Single by Post Malone featuring DaBaby

from the album Hollywood's Bleeding
- Released: September 17, 2019
- Genre: Pop-trap
- Length: 3:16
- Label: Republic
- Songwriters: Austin Post; Jonathan Kirk; Louis Bell; William Walsh
- Producer: Louis Bell

Post Malone singles chronology
"Circles" (2019)	"Enemies" (2019)	"Allergic" (2019)

DaBaby singles chronology
"Panini (DaBaby Remix)" (2019)	"Enemies" (2019)	"Intro" (2019)

"Enemies" is a song by American musician Post Malone featuring American rapper DaBaby. It was sent to rhythmic contemporary radio as the fourth single from Post Malone's third studio album, Hollywood's Bleeding on September 17, 2019. The song was written by the artists, along with Billy Walsh and producer Louis Bell. The track became Malone's seventh number one (and his fourth from Hollywood's Bleeding) and DaBaby's first on Billboard's Rhythmic Songs Chart in November 2019.

The song peaked at number 16 on the US Billboard Hot 100.

== Critical reception ==
The song received acclaim mostly for DaBaby's guest appearance. Jayson Greene at Pitchfork praised DaBaby's guest verse on the song, noting that he "crushes his turn". Writing for Vulture, Craig Jenkins thought that DaBaby even "stole the show" on the song and described his verse as a "passive-aggressive jab at backstabbing friends". However, in a review of the song's parent album, Chris DeVille from Stereogum opined that DaBaby along with Meek Mill merely delivered "the requisite rap verse on a Top 40 single". Rolling Stone's Nick Catucci pointed out how DaBaby's flow "highlights Post Malone's technical laxity as a rapper, but also his unerring instinct for what will cut through the ambient noise in the car, at the supermarket or during hour four of the frat party".

== Personnel ==
Credits adapted from Tidal.

- Post Malone – vocals, songwriting
- DaBaby – featured vocals, songwriting
- Louis Bell – production, recording, vocal production, programming, songwriting
- Billy Walsh – songwriting
- Manny Marroquin – mixing
- Chris Galland – mixing assistant
- Robin Florent – mixing assistant
- Scott Desmarais – mixing assistant
- Jeremie Inhaber – mixing assistant

== Charts ==
=== Weekly charts ===
Chart (2019)	Peak position
Australia (ARIA)	28
Canada Hot 100 (Billboard)	15
Czech Republic Singles Digital (ČNS IFPI)	22
Denmark (Tracklisten)	25
France (SNEP)	159
Greece (IFPI)	62
Hungary (Stream Top 40)	16
Italy (FIMI)	59
Lithuania (AGATA)	28
Netherlands (Single Top 100)	32
New Zealand (Recorded Music NZ)	37
Norway (VG-lista)	17
Portugal (AFP)	41
Slovakia Singles Digital (ČNS IFPI)	20
Sweden (Sverigetopplistan)	32
UK Audio Streaming (OCC)	35
US Billboard Hot 100	16
US Hot R&B/Hip-Hop Songs (Billboard)	9
US Rhythmic Airplay (Billboard)	1
US Rolling Stone Top 100	4

=== Year-end charts ===
Chart (2019)	Position
US Hot R&B/Hip-Hop Songs (Billboard)	84
Chart (2020)	Position
US Hot R&B/Hip-Hop Songs (Billboard)	100
US Rhythmic (Billboard)	33

== Certifications ==
Region	Certification	Certified units/sales
Australia (ARIA)	Platinum	70,000^{‡}
Brazil (Pro-Música Brasil)	Platinum	40,000^{‡}
Canada (Music Canada)	3× Platinum	240,000^{‡}
Denmark (IFPI Danmark)	Gold	45,000^{‡}
New Zealand (RMNZ)	Platinum	30,000^{‡}
Portugal (AFP)	Gold	5,000^{‡}
United Kingdom (BPI)	Silver	200,000^{‡}
United States (RIAA)	Platinum	1,000,000^{‡}
^{‡} Sales+streaming figures based on certification alone.

== Release history ==
Country	Date	Format	Label	Ref.
Various	September 6, 2019	Digital download; streaming	Republic	
United States	September 17, 2019	Rhythmic contemporary radio	Republic	
