= Wow (Post Malone song) =

Single by Post Malone

from the album Hollywood's Bleeding
- Released: December 24, 2018
- Recorded: 2018
- Genre: Pop-trap
- Length: 2:29
- Label: Republic
- Songwriters: Austin Post; Louis Bell; William Walsh; Adam Feeney; Carl Rosen; Anthoine Walters
- Producers: Frank Dukes; Louis Bell; Anthoine Walters

Post Malone singles chronology
"Sunflower" (2018)	"Wow" (2018)	"Goodbyes" (2019)

Music video
- "Wow." on YouTube

"Wow" (stylized as "Wow.") is a song by American musician Post Malone, released as the lead single from his third studio album, Hollywood's Bleeding (2019), via Republic Records on December 24, 2018. The song was written by Malone alongside Billy Walsh, Anthoine Walters, Carl Rosen, and producers Louis Bell and Frank Dukes.

"Wow" peaked at number two on the US Billboard Hot 100, Post Malone's sixth top 10 hit.

== Background ==
Post Malone stated earlier in December that he wished to release another "body of work" before the year was over; his previous single was "Sunflower" with Swae Lee, the lead single from the December 2018 movie Spider-Man: Into the Spider-Verse soundtrack. The song, released on Christmas Eve, was accompanied with an animated Christmas-themed visualizer which premiered on Malone's YouTube channel the same day.

Lyrically, "Wow" discusses Malone's climb to fame, wealth, and success while emceeing a club environment.

== Composition ==
"Wow" is written in the key of F-sharp minor at a tempo of 100 beats per minute.

== Critical reception ==
HipHop-N-More stated that the song felt like "more than just a throwaway", saying it "could be another big moment for Post on the charts and radio". NME called it one of Post Malone's "most stripped back recordings to date", saying his rapping over a beat is a "stark contrast" to his previous Autotuned vocals and "heavily produced" music. Billboard magazine said the song "bounces along on a tick-tock beat and deep bass thrum", further describing the song as a chronicle of Post's rise to fame.

=== Accolades ===
Year	Ceremony	Category	Result	Ref.
2019	American Music Awards	Favorite Song — Rap/Hip-Hop	Nominated	
2019	Rockbjörnen	Foreign Song of the Year	Nominated	
2019	Teen Choice Awards	Choice Song: R&B/Hip-Hop	Nominated	
2019	Teen Choice Awards	Choice Song From a Movie	Nominated	

== Commercial performance ==
"Wow." debuted at number 47 on the Billboard Hot 100. In its third week, it moved up to number 11 before ascending to the top 10, where it peaked at number two, being held off the top spot by "7 Rings" by Ariana Grande on April 6, 2019. It fell to number four the following week. Two weeks later it rose again to its peak of number two, this time blocked by the remix of "Old Town Road" by Lil Nas X featuring Billy Ray Cyrus, remaining there for another week, totaling three non-consecutive weeks in the runner-up spot. It remained in the top ten for 24 consecutive weeks.

== Remix ==
The official remix of the song, featuring fellow American rappers Roddy Ricch and Tyga, premiered on March 15, 2019. There are two versions of audio for the remix. One is the explicit version and the other is the clean edited version, which appears on the various artists compilation album Now That's What I Call Music! 71 (2019) in the United States. The music video for the remix was published on March 25, 2019, on Malone's YouTube channel. The remix also appears in the soundtrack of the videogame NBA 2K20 (2019).

== Music video ==
The music video for "Wow." was released on March 19, 2019, on Malone's YouTube channel. The "video blog-styled" video features footage of Malone with Red Hot Chili Peppers, DJ Khaled and Mike Alancourt. The video was directed by James DeFina. It has a viewing of 308 million on YouTube as of June 15, 2023. The music video for the remix of the song featuring Roddy Ricch and Tyga was released six days after on March 25, 2019, on Malone's YouTube channel.

== Personnel ==
Credits adapted from Tidal.

- Post Malone – principal vocalist, songwriting
- Louis Bell – production, recording, vocal production, programming, songwriting
- Frank Dukes – production, programming, songwriting
- Billy Walsh – songwriting
- Anthoine Walters - background vocals, songwriting
- Carl Rosen - songwriting
- Manny Marroquin – mixing
- Chris Galland – mixing assistant
- Robin Florent – mixing assistant
- Scott Desmarais – mixing assistant
- Tyga – featured vocalist, songwriting (remix)
- Roddy Ricch – featured vocalist, songwriting (remix)
- Mike Bozzi – mastering (remix)

== Charts ==
=== Weekly charts ===
Chart (2019)	Peak position
Australia (ARIA)	2
Austria (Ö3 Austria Top 40)	13
Belgium (Ultratop 50 Flanders)	20
Belgium (Ultratop 50 Wallonia)	46
Canada Hot 100 (Billboard)	3
Canada CHR/Top 40 (Billboard)	5
Czech Republic Singles Digital (ČNS IFPI)	6
Denmark (Tracklisten)	2
Estonia (Eesti Tipp-40)	2
Finland (Suomen virallinen lista)	1
France (SNEP)	75
Germany (GfK)	16
Greece International (IFPI)	2
Hungary (Stream Top 40)	2
Ireland (IRMA)	2
Italy (FIMI)	15
Latvia (LAIPA)	1
Lithuania (AGATA)	1
Lebanon (Lebanese Top 20)	11
Malaysia (RIM)	8
Mexico Airplay (Billboard)	32
Netherlands (Single Top 100)	21
New Zealand (Recorded Music NZ)	1
Norway (VG-lista)	1
Portugal (AFP)	4
Romania (Airplay 100)	68
Scottish Singles Sales (Official Charts)	20
Singapore (RIAS)	12
Slovakia Singles Digital (ČNS IFPI)	2
Spain (Promusicae)	48
Sweden (Sverigetopplistan)	2
Switzerland (Schweizer Hitparade)	11
UK Singles (Official Charts)	3
UK Hip Hop/R&B (Official Charts)	1
US Billboard Hot 100	2
US Dance Club Songs (Billboard)	42
US Dance Airplay (Billboard)	5
US Hot R&B/Hip-Hop Songs (Billboard)	1
US Pop Airplay (Billboard)	1
US Rhythmic Airplay (Billboard)	1
US Rolling Stone Top 100	16

Wow (Remix)

Chart (2019)	Peak position
New Zealand Hot Singles (RMNZ)	13

=== Year-end charts ===
Chart (2019)	Position
Australia (ARIA)	7
Austria (Ö3 Austria Top 40)	44
Belgium (Ultratop Flanders)	58
Canada (Canadian Hot 100)	9
Denmark (Tracklisten)	10
Germany (Official German Charts)	39
Iceland (Tónlistinn)	74
Ireland (IRMA)	14
Italy (FIMI)	72
Latvia (LAIPA)	4
Netherlands (Single Top 100)	80
New Zealand (Recorded Music NZ)	4
Norway (VG-lista)	19
Portugal (AFP)	17
Sweden (Sverigetopplistan)	19
Switzerland (Schweizer Hitparade)	34
UK Singles (Official Charts Company)	17
US Billboard Hot 100	5
US Dance/Mix Show Airplay (Billboard)	10
US Hot R&B/Hip-Hop Songs (Billboard)	4
US Mainstream Top 40 (Billboard)	9
US Rhythmic (Billboard)	1
US Rolling Stone Top 100	3

=== Decade-end charts ===
Chart (2010–2019)	Position
US Billboard Hot 100	64

== Certifications ==
Region	Certification	Certified units/sales
Australia (ARIA)	10× Platinum	700,000^{‡}
Belgium (BRMA)	Gold	20,000^{‡}
Brazil (Pro-Música Brasil)	2× Diamond	320,000^{‡}
Canada (Music Canada)	Diamond	800,000^{‡}
Denmark (IFPI Danmark)	2× Platinum	180,000^{‡}
France (SNEP)	Platinum	200,000^{‡}
Germany (BVMI)	Gold	200,000^{‡}
Italy (FIMI)	Platinum	50,000^{‡}
New Zealand (RMNZ)	6× Platinum	180,000^{‡}
Poland (ZPAV)	Platinum	20,000^{‡}
Portugal (AFP)	3× Platinum	30,000^{‡}
Spain (Promusicae)	Platinum	60,000^{‡}
United Kingdom (BPI)	3× Platinum	1,800,000^{‡}
United States (RIAA)	Diamond	10,000,000^{‡}
^{‡} Sales+streaming figures based on certification alone.

== Release history ==
Region	Date	Format	Label	Ref.
United States	January 8, 2019	Contemporary hit radio	Republic	
United States	January 8, 2019	Rhythmic contemporary radio	Republic	
Various	May 24, 2019	7-inch single	Republic	

== See also ==
- List of highest-certified singles in Australia
- List of number-one singles of 2019 (Finland)
- List of number-one singles from the 2010s (New Zealand)
- List of number-one songs in Norway
