= Tech Panda & Kenzani =

Indian DJ duo

- Also known as: Tech Panda & Kenzani
- Origin: Delhi, India
- Genres: Electronic dance music, Folktronica, Techno, House music
- Occupation(s): DJ, record producer
- Years active: 2010 (Independently) -present
- Labels: Sony Music Entertainment, Groovebird Records, Aluku Records
- Members: Rupinder Nanda, Kedar Santwani

Tech Panda & Kenzani are an Indian electronic DJ and music production duo based out of Delhi consisting of Rupinder Nanda - Tech Panda (born, 12 December 1986) and Kedar Santwani - Kenzani (born 26 May 1989). They are best known for their tracks "Khoyo", "Dillagi", "Dilbar" and Indian version of "Sunflower" from the film Spider-Man: Into the Spider-Verse.

== History ==
The duo was formed in around 2018. After Rupinder and Kedar met via a friend, they started talking about their artistic aspirations right away. Originally, Tech Panda and Kenzani were previously solo DJs and producers. Later, they began collaborating and performing live together and soon formed the musical duo "Tech Panda & Kenzani". Kenzani is an artist name derived from the combination of first name Kedar and last name Santwani. Tech Panda adopted his nickname from his school days, when he was called Panda for his laziness. He added the word Tech to his name to reflect his affinity for tech house music.

The duo formed the abstract genre "Indian electronica", taking inspiration from house, techno and subgenres.

== Career ==
In 2019, they released "Saawariya" together. It was featured in BBC Asian Network and MTV USA. They started primarily focusing on folktronica, Indian electronic music and Electronica eventually.

In 2021, their single "Khoyo" gained millions of streams after it was sync licensed for the Amazon Prime series "Shehar Lakhot".

In 2023, their single "Dilbar" with Rusha & Blizza went viral on Instagram with audience creating a total of 400K+ videos using the song and DSPs, gaining millions of streams within the month of release. Dilbar was also charting across Canada, UK, Dubai and Pakistan and in India Indie Charts on Spotify and No.1 in Apple Music India Music Electronic Charts for over three months. The track was later signed by Sony Music. Same year, they released another single "Kulli" which received significant coverage as well.

In June 2023, They were asked to recreate the track "Sunflower" from the film “Spider-Man: Into the Spider-Verse” to Indian musical traditions and Hindi vocals. The version was released by Sony Music Entertainment (Maddison Gate Records) and was featured in the official covers for the sequel film, “Spider-Man: Across the Spider-Verse”. The cover version featured the artist "Badal" for the Hindi Vocals.

In September 2023, They were invited as speaker for the TED event hosted independently by TCET called "The Symphony of Life".

In December 2023, They collaborated with the British rapper Raxstar and Folktronica duo Hari & Sukhmani for the single "Talk To Me Nice", which was mixed and mastered by Grammy winning producer Luca Pretolesi.

== Major Performances ==
Event	Hosted By	City	Date	Ref
DGTL Festival	DGTL	Mumbai	18 November	
MOTOSONIC	Royal Enfield	Goa	24 November 2023	
Swiggy SteppinOut Presents Tech Panda X Kenzani	Swiggy	Jaipur	5 August 2023	
The Mijwan Fashion Show	Manish Malhotra	Mumbai	31 July 2023	
Indo Warehouse: Tech Panda x Kenzani	Indo Warehouse	New York	11 June 2022	
Holi Moo! Festival - Dehradun	Holi Moo!	Dehradun	4 March 2023	
Mahindra Roots Festival	Mahindra	Mumbai	24 February 2023	
Press Play	Armani Exchange	New Delhi	11 February 2023	
Gin Extravaganza Unleashed: Retroverse Revelry	Gin Explorers Club	Gurugram	10 February 2024	
Joytown Festival	BMW	Mumbai	7 January 2023	
Road to Lolla: India	Lollapalooza	Jaipur	23 December 2022	
Zomaland	Zomato	Delhi	17 December 2022	
Swiggy SteppinOut Music Festival	Swiggy	Bangalore	10 December 2022	

== Discography ==
Title	Featuring Artist	Year
Heer	Talwiinder	2024
Talk to Me Nice	Raxstar, Hari & Sukhmani	2023
Mohabbat		2023
Dua		2023
Kulli		2023
Sunflower (From "Spider-Man:Across the Spider-Verse") (Indian Remake)	Badal	2023
Dilbar	Rusha & Blizza	2023
Gangster Disco		2022
Dillagi		2022
Gajrela		2022
Shaan		2022
Vaya		2022
Freedom		2022
Showstopper (Manish Malhotra)		2022
Ranjha		2022
Aankhen	Aamir Azher	2022
Metanoia		2022
Khoyo Remix	Kahani	2022
Doya Reprise		2022
Melancholia		2022
My Heart goes Disco		2022
Piya		2022
Raatan	Mitika Kanwar	2022
Kosha		2022
Yakeen	Aamir Azher	2021
Saawariya Reprise	Rupali Moghe	2021
Sinister		2021
Rangila		2021
Mahane		2021
Tutda Taara	Mitika Kanwar	2021
Bahaar		2021
Urja		2021
Guftagu		2021
Essence of Saundh		2021
Chidiya		2021
Daydream		2021
Ethnicity		2021
Jiya		2021
Back in Time		2021
Bhaa		2021
Colossal		2020
Laagi		2020
Falak		2020
Sauda		2020
Out of the Blue		2020
My Window at Night		2020
Uncertainty	Aneesha	2020
Infiniity		2020
You and Me		2020
Super Naani		2020
Svara		2020
Last Tear		2020
Fable		2020
Promised Land		2020
Eunoia		2020
Together		2020
Doya		2020
Closer		2020
Mat Lovely		2020
Levitate		2020
5 Am		2020
Lost In Love		2020
Duniya Sari		2020
Sadhu		2020
Poetic Love		2020
Indian Monsoon		2020
Naina		2020
Banjara		2020
Khoyo (2)		2020
Khoyo		2020
Headstart		2020
Tropical Soil		2020
Reflections		2020
Faith Above Else		2020
Calling It a Day		2020
Resurgence		2020
Saawariya		2019
Ruhani		2018
Widing System		2018
Naani		2018
