= Teen Choice Award for Choice Music – R&B/Hip-Hop Song =

Entertainment award category

The following is a list of Teen Choice Award winners and nominees for Choice Music - R&B/Hip-Hop Song.

== Winners and nominees ==
=== 2000s ===
Year	Winner	Nominees	Ref.
2000	"Thong Song" – Sisqó	"Forgot About Dre" – Dr. Dre feat. Eminem; "Holla Holla" – Ja Rule; "Hot Boyz" – Missy Elliott; "Imperial" – Rah Digga feat. Busta Rhymes; "Say My Name" – Destiny's Child; "Untitled (How Does It Feel)" – D'Angelo; "You Can Do It" – Ice Cube	
2001	"Let Me Blow Ya Mind" – Eve feat. Gwen Stefani	"Country Grammar (Hot Shit)" – Nelly; "Get Ur Freak On" – Missy Elliott; "Ms. Jackson" – OutKast; "Peaches & Cream" – 112; "Shake Ya Ass" – Mystikal; "Stutter" – Joe feat. Mystikal; "What Would You Do?" – City High	
2002	"Ain't It Funny" – Jennifer Lopez feat. Ja Rule	"Foolish" – Ashanti; "Gangsta Lovin'" – Eve feat. Alicia Keys; "Girlfriend" – *NSYNC feat. Nelly; "More Than a Woman" – Aaliyah; "Pass the Courvoisier, Part II" – Busta Rhymes feat. P. Diddy & Pharrell; "Oops (Oh My)" – Tweet feat. Missy Elliott; "What's Luv?" – Fat Joe feat. Ashanti	
2003	"Like I Love You" – Justin Timberlake	"4 Ever" – Lil' Mo feat. Fabolous; "How You Gonna Act Like That" – Tyrese; "No Letting Go" – Wayne Wonder; "Put That Woman First" – Jaheim; "Rock wit U (Awww Baby)" – Ashanti; "Snake" – R. Kelly feat. Big Tigger; "So Gone – Monica	
2004
2004	Choice R&B Track		
2004	"Yeah!" – Usher feat. Lil Jon & Ludacris	"Fell in Love with a Boy" – Joss Stone; "I Don't Wanna Know" – Mario Winans feat. Enya & P. Diddy; "If I Ain't Got You" – Alicia Keys; "Naughty Girl" – Beyoncé; "Sorry 2004" – Ruben Studdard; "Talk About Our Love" – Brandy feat. Kanye West; "Walked Outta Heaven" – Jagged Edge	
2004	Choice Hip-Hop/Rap Track		
2004	"Where Is the Love?" – The Black Eyed Peas	"All Falls Down" – Kanye West feat. Syleena Johnson; "Dirt off Your Shoulder" – Jay Z; "One Call Away" – Chingy feat. J-Weav; "Salt Shaker" – Ying Yang Twins feat. Lil Jon & The East Side Boyz; "Stand Up" – Ludacris feat. Shawnna; "Tipsy" – J-Kwon; "The Way You Move" – OutKast feat. Sleepy Brown	
2005	"1, 2 Step" – Ciara feat. Missy Elliott	"1 Thing" – Amerie; "Caught Up" – Usher; "Get Right" – Jennifer Lopez; "It's Like That" – Mariah Carey; "Let Me Love You" – Mario; "Soldier" – Destiny's Child feat. T.I. and Lil Wayne; "Touch" – Omarion	
2006
2006	Choice R&B/Hip-Hop Track		
2006	"Promiscuous" – Nelly Furtado feat. Timbaland	"Ain't No Other Man" – Christina Aguilera; "Buttons" – The Pussycat Dolls feat. Snoop Dogg; "Check on It" – Beyoncé feat. Slim Thug; "Hips Don't Lie" – Shakira feat. Wyclef Jean; "Temperature" – Sean Paul	
2006	Choice Rap Track		
2006	"Ridin'" – Chamillionaire feat. Krayzie Bone	"Lean wit It, Rock wit It" – Dem Franchize Boyz; "Shake" – Ying Yang Twins feat. Pitbull; "Snap Ya Fingers" – Lil Jon feat. E-40 & Sean Paul; "What You Know" – T.I.; "Where'd You Go" – Fort Minor feat. Holly Brook	
2007
2007	Choice R&B Track		
2007	"Beautiful Girls" – Sean Kingston	"Because of You" – Ne-Yo; "Get It Shawty" – Lloyd; "Last Night" – Diddy feat. Keyshia Cole; "Wall to Wall" – Chris Brown	
2007	Choice Rap/Hip-Hop Track		
2007	"The Way I Are" – Timbaland feat. Keri Hilson & D.O.E.	"Buy U a Drank (Shawty Snappin')" – T-Pain feat. Yung Joc; "Party Like a Rockstar" – Shop Boyz; "Pop, Lock & Drop It" – Huey; "This Is Why I'm Hot" – Mims	
2008
2008	Choice R&B Track		
2008	"Forever" – Chris Brown	"Bye Bye" – Mariah Carey; "Damaged" – Danity Kane; "Hey Baby (Jump Off)" – Bow Wow and Omarion; "Take You There" – Sean Kingston	
2008	Choice Rap/Hip-Hop Track		
2008	"Shawty Get Loose" – Lil Mama feat. Chris Brown and T-Pain	"The Anthem" – Pitbull feat. Lil Jon; "Homecoming" – Kanye West feat. Chris Martin; "Party People" – Nelly feat. Fergie; "Superstar" – Lupe Fiasco feat. Matthew Santos	
2009
2009	Choice R&B Track		
2009	"Single Ladies (Put a Ring on It)" – Beyoncé	"If This Isn't Love" – Jennifer Hudson; "Kiss Me thru the Phone" – Soulja Boy feat. Sammie; "Love Lockdown" – Kanye West; "Mad" – Ne-Yo	
2009	Choice Rap/Hip-Hop Track		
2009	"Boom Boom Pow" – The Black Eyed Peas	"Heartless" – Kanye West; "I Know You Want Me (Calle Ocho)" – Pitbull; "I Love College" – Asher Roth; "Right Round" – Flo Rida feat. Ke$ha	

=== 2010s ===
Year	Winner	Nominees	Ref.
2010
2010	Choice R&B/Hip-Hop Track		
2010	"Love the Way You Lie" – Eminem feat. Rihanna	"Carry Out" – Timbaland feat. Justin Timberlake; "Hello Good Morning" – Diddy – Dirty Money feat. T.I.; "Find Your Love" – Drake; "Wavin' Flag" – K'naan	
2011	"Run the World (Girls)" – Beyoncé	"All of the Lights" – Kanye West ft. Rihanna; "Don't Wanna Go Home" – Jason Derulo; "I Need a Doctor" – Dr. Dre ft. Eminem & Skylar Grey; "Just Can't Get Enough" – The Black Eyed Peas	
2012	"Starships" – Nicki Minaj	"Love on Top" – Beyoncé; "Take Care" – Drake feat. Rihanna; "Wild Ones" – Flo Rida feat. Sia; "Without You" – David Guetta feat. Usher	
2013	"Can't Hold Us" – Macklemore & Ryan Lewis feat. Ray Dalton	"#Beautiful" – Mariah Carey; "Diamonds" – Rihanna; "Next To Me" – Emeli Sandé; "Started from the Bottom" – Drake	
2014	"Fancy" – Iggy Azalea ft. Charli XCX	"All of Me" – John Legend; "Na Na" – Trey Songz; "Pills n Potions" – Nicki Minaj; "Turn Down for What" – DJ Snake and Lil Jon	
2015	"See You Again" – Wiz Khalifa feat. Charlie Puth	"Better Have My Money" – Rihanna; "Earned It" – The Weeknd; "FourFiveSeconds" – Rihanna, Kanye West and Paul McCartney; "I Don't Like It, I Love It" – Flo Rida feat. Robin Thicke and Verdine White; "Watch Me (Whip/Nae Nae)" – Silentó	
2016	"One Dance" – Drake feat. Wizkid & Kyla	"Chasing the Sky" – Cast of Empire feat. Terrence Howard, Jussie Smollett, & Bryshere Y. Gray; "Panda" – Desiigner; "Something New" – Zendaya feat. Chris Brown; "Team" – Iggy Azalea; "Work" – Rihanna feat. Drake	
2017	"I'm the One" – DJ Khaled feat. Justin Bieber, Quavo, Chance the Rapper, & Lil Wayne	"Glorious" – Macklemore feat. Skylar Grey; "Location" – Khalid; "Passionfruit" – Drake; "Redbone" – Childish Gambino; "That's What I Like" – Bruno Mars	
2018	"Love Lies" – Khalid & Normani	"All the Stars" – Kendrick Lamar & SZA; "Finesse (Remix)" – Bruno Mars feat. Cardi B; "God's Plan" – Drake; "Let You Down" – NF; "This Is America" – Childish Gambino	
2019	"Old Town Road [Remix]" – Lil Nas X & Billy Ray Cyrus	"Going Bad" – Meek Mill feat. Drake; "Pure Water" – Mustard & Migos; "Sunflower (Spider-Man: Into the Spider-Verse)" – Post Malone; "Talk" – Khalid; "Wow" – Post Malone	
