= Mike Bozzi =

American mastering engineer

- Born: Michael Bozzi
- Origin: Hollywood, California, U.S.
- Occupation: Mastering engineer
- Years active: 1992–present
- Website: berniegrundmanmastering.com/mike-bozzi.html

Michael Bozzi is an American mastering engineer based in Hollywood, California. He is best known for his extensive work with Kendrick Lamar, mastering all of his major studio albums including Good Kid, M.A.A.D City (2012), To Pimp a Butterfly (2015), and Damn (2017). His credits also include work for Post Malone, SZA, Tyler, the Creator, Mac Miller, and numerous other artists across hip-hop, R&B, and pop genres. He won the Grammy Award for Record of the Year in 2019 for mastering Childish Gambino's "This Is America" and has received six nominations for Album of the Year and six nominations for Record of the Year.

== Early life ==
Bozzi was raised in a musical family with deep ties to the industry. His father served as a prominent radio program director in New York and Los Angeles before transitioning to an executive role at a major record label, exposing Bozzi to various aspects of the music business from an early age. Early in his career, Bozzi worked in various music industry roles, including as an usher at the Greek Theatre, a manager in music retail for an independent label, and as an intern at A&M Records.

== Career ==
=== Bernie Grundman Mastering (1992–2015) ===
Bozzi joined Bernie Grundman Mastering in 1992 as a part-time quality control engineer, where his duties involved critical listening and creating final production masters for duplication. Within a year, he became assistant engineer to legendary mastering engineer Brian "Big Bass" Gardner, serving as his production engineer for over 20 years. During this period as Gardner's assistant, Bozzi contributed to multiplatinum and Grammy-winning projects by artists including Prince, Janet Jackson, Linkin Park, Dr. Dre, Eminem, Outkast, Katy Perry, and Christina Aguilera. Following Gardner's retirement in 2015, Bozzi took over his studio and became a lead mastering engineer at the facility.

=== Lead engineer and Kendrick Lamar collaboration ===
Bozzi's breakthrough as a lead mastering engineer came with Kendrick Lamar's album Good Kid, M.A.A.D City (2012), which earned him his first Grammy nomination for Album of the Year. This began a long-standing collaboration with Lamar, and Bozzi has since mastered all of his major releases, including To Pimp a Butterfly (2015), Untitled Unmastered (2016), and Damn (2017), as well as singles like "Humble" and "All the Stars". Bozzi has become the preferred mastering engineer for the Top Dawg Entertainment (TDE) roster, mastering releases for Schoolboy Q (including "That Part" featuring Kanye West), SZA, Jay Rock, and Ab-Soul.

=== Expansion and continued success ===
Beyond his work with Kendrick Lamar and TDE, Bozzi has mastered major releases across multiple genres. His credits include extensive work with Post Malone, mastering the albums Beerbongs & Bentleys (2018), Hollywood's Bleeding (2019), and singles including "Rockstar" (featuring 21 Savage), "Sunflower" (with Swae Lee), and "Circles". He has also mastered albums for Tyler, the Creator (Igor, 2019), Mac Miller (Balloonerism, 2025), Doja Cat ("Say So"), and numerous other artists including Ice Cube, Snoop Dogg, YG, Earl Sweatshirt, Tupac Shakur, Young Buck, and Giggs. In 2019, Bozzi received a Latin Grammy Award nomination for Best Engineered Album for Ricardo Montaner's Montaner, demonstrating his range beyond hip-hop and R&B.

== Awards and nominations ==
Year	Nominee / work	Award	Result
2013	Good Kid, M.A.A.D City	Grammy Award for Album of the Year	Nominated
2016	To Pimp a Butterfly	Grammy Award for Album of the Year	Nominated
2018	Damn	Grammy Award for Album of the Year	Nominated
2018	"Humble"	Grammy Award for Record of the Year	Nominated
2019	"All the Stars"	Grammy Award for Record of the Year	Nominated
2019	"Rockstar"	Grammy Award for Record of the Year	Nominated
2019	"This Is America"	Grammy Award for Record of the Year	Won
2019	Beerbongs & Bentleys	Grammy Award for Album of the Year	Nominated
2020	Black Panther: The Album	Grammy Award for Album of the Year	Nominated
2020	"Sunflower"	Grammy Award for Record of the Year	Nominated
2021	Hollywood's Bleeding	Grammy Award for Album of the Year	Nominated
2021	"Circles"	Grammy Award for Record of the Year	Nominated
2021	"Say So"	Grammy Award for Record of the Year	Nominated
2019	Montaner	Latin Grammy Award for Best Engineered Album	Nominated
2025	"Igual Que Un Ángel"	Latin Grammy Award for Record of the Year	Nominated

== Selected discography ==
Album/Song	Year	Artist
Good Kid, M.A.A.D City	2012	Kendrick Lamar
To Pimp a Butterfly	2015	Kendrick Lamar
Blank Face LP	2016	Schoolboy Q
Damn	2017	Kendrick Lamar
Ctrl	2017	SZA
Beerbongs & Bentleys	2018	Post Malone
"This Is America"	2018	Childish Gambino
Igor	2019	Tyler, the Creator
Hollywood's Bleeding	2019	Post Malone
Balloonerism	2025	Mac Miller
