= Circles (Post Malone song) =

2019 single by Post Malone

Single by Post Malone

from the album Hollywood's Bleeding
- Released: August 30, 2019
- Recorded: August 8, 2018
- Genre: Soft rock; downtempo; alternative rock; chillwave; pop
- Length: 3:35
- Label: Republic
- Songwriters: Austin Post; Adam Feeney; William Walsh; Kaan Güneşberk; Louis Bell; Tyler Armes
- Producers: Post Malone; Louis Bell; Frank Dukes

Post Malone singles chronology
"Goodbyes" (2019)	"Circles" (2019)	"Enemies" (2019)

Music video
- "Circles" on YouTube

"Circles" is a song by American musician Post Malone. It was released through Republic Records on August 30, 2019, as the third single from Malone's third studio album Hollywood's Bleeding (2019). It reached number one on the US Billboard Hot 100 for the week of November 30, 2019, topping the chart for three weeks, marking Post Malone's fourth number-one song, as well as his first solo effort to top the chart. The song also reached number one in Iceland, Malaysia, and New Zealand, as well as the top 10 in 20 additional countries. It was the most played song of 2020 on adult contemporary radio in the US and was also the second best-selling song in 2020 in the country. It is also certified Diamond in the US, Canada, and France, 16× Platinum in Australia, and Gold or higher in 11 additional countries. It was also nominated for Record of the Year and Song of the Year at the 63rd Annual Grammy Awards.

== Promotion ==
Post Malone premiered the song live during his Bud Light Dive Bar Tour show in New York City on August 5, 2019, where he claimed it would be released the following week. A snippet of the track was posted to Malone's YouTube channel the same day. He previewed the song in August on the Tonight Show Starring Jimmy Fallon.

== Composition ==
"Circles" is a soft rock, downtempo, alternative rock, and pop song that draws from elements of pop rock and consists of a "bouncy, melancholy" melody, alongside a "gentle acoustic groove". The chorus has been described as "compulsory singalong". It is written in the key of C major, in common time, at a tempo of 120 beats per minute. It follows a chord structure of Cmaj7–Em/B–Fmaj7–Fm, followed by Cmaj7–Em/B–Fmaj7–G6.

== Critical reception ==
The song received critical acclaim. Billboard described it as being "backed by sunny acoustic guitars, swirling percussion, and infectious melodies", and that while it has a "funky feel, the meaning is a bit more somber, detailing a relationship gone cold".

R Dub, Z90.3 director of programming, told Billboard, "For me, the staying power of 'Circles' is due to a combination of an absolutely addicting, fun, emotional, and at the same time, non-fatiguing hook, combined with relatable lyrics. Who can't relate to going in circles in so many aspects of life? Young, old, rich, poor, black, white… We're all going through it".

The song's musical backing has been frequently compared to that of Tame Impala – so much so, that Tame Impala's Kevin Parker was originally believed to be one of the song's co-writers prior to the song's release.

== Chart performance ==
On the chart dated November 30, 2019, "Circles" became Post Malone's fourth number one on the US Billboard Hot 100 and his first unaccompanied by another artist. It also marked his second Hot 100 number one of 2019, following "Sunflower" with Swae Lee, which led the chart in January. On the chart dated May 2, 2020, "Circles" broke the record for the most weeks spent in the Hot 100's top 10; 34 weeks – surpassing his own song, "Sunflower" (2019), Maroon 5 and Cardi B's "Girls Like You" (2018), and Ed Sheeran's "Shape of You" (2017), which all logged 33 weeks each in that region. It simultaneously passed the latter for the most weeks spent in the top 10 from a song's debut. It later extended its record to 39 weeks. "Circles" would keep the record for five more months before The Weeknd's "Blinding Lights" broke the record by reaching 40 weeks (and then 57 in total); it would later be surpassed again in 2021 by Dua Lipa's "Levitating," which spent a total of 41 weeks in the top 10. "Circles" spent 61 weeks on the chart before leaving in November 2020. It was also the most-played radio song of 2020.

Additionally, it became the first song to spend 30 weeks in the top 10 of Billboard's Mainstream Top 40 radio airplay chart, where it also ranked at number one for 10 weeks, becoming the first single by a solo male artist (no features) to achieve double-digit frames at number one on that chart.

Elsewhere, the song also peaked at number one in Iceland, Malaysia, and New Zealand, number two in Australia, Canada, Ireland, Norway, Singapore, and Slovakia, number three in Czech Republic, Denmark, Lithuania, Slovenia, and the UK, while reaching the top 10 in several other nations.

== Lawsuit ==
Malone filed a lawsuit against songwriter Tyler Armes for "falsely claiming that he is a co-author of the musical composition contained in the 'Circles' track". According to the complaint from Malone, he continued to work with songwriters Walsh, Gunesberk, and Bell in subsequent sessions after August 8, while Armes wasn't present in either of those sessions. The issue was settled out of court in 2023.

== Music video ==
The music video, directed by Colin Tilley, was released on September 3, 2019. As of September 2024, it has over 700 million views on YouTube. It is a medieval-style metaphor of the main theme of the song, "running in circles" in a relationship and failing to put an end to it, thus ending up getting hurt. Post Malone plays a knight in armor who has to rescue a princess locked up in a tower (but endowed with magical powers). The princess, seeing the future through a magic mirror, discovers that Post will be defeated by the enemies and burned alive. Meanwhile, Post has a hallucination in which he sees the same future and is then buried alive by zombies, but the princess awakens him with a magic blue rose (which symbolizes the unattainable). Post goes to rescue her, succeeding. But the director's choice to show again, at the end of the video, Post staring at that tragic future during the hallucination, suggests that it is bound to happen.

== Personnel ==
Credits adapted from Tidal.

Musicians

- Post Malone – vocals, programming, guitar
- Frank Dukes – programming
- Louis Bell – programming
- Kaan Gunesberk – guitar

Production

- Frank Dukes – production, songwriting
- Louis Bell – production, vocal production, songwriting
- Post Malone – production, songwriting
- Billy Walsh – songwriting
- Kaan Gunesberk – songwriting

Technical

- Louis Bell – recording
- Manny Marroquin – mixing
- Chris Galland – mixing assistant
- Robin Florent – mixing assistant
- Scott Desmarais – mixing assistant
- Jeremie Inhaber – mixing assistant
- Mike Bozzi – mastering

== Charts ==
=== Weekly charts ===
Chart (2019–2020)	Peak position
Argentina Hot 100 (Billboard)	84
Australia (ARIA)	2
Austria (Ö3 Austria Top 40)	9
Belgium (Ultratop 50 Flanders)	5
Belgium (Ultratop 50 Wallonia)	15
Brazil (Top 100 Brasil)	48
Canada Hot 100 (Billboard)	2
Canada AC (Billboard)	1
Canada CHR/Top 40 (Billboard)	1
Canada Hot AC (Billboard)	1
Chile (Monitor Latino)	17
Colombia (National-Report)	57
Croatia International Airplay (Top lista)	10
Czech Republic Airplay (ČNS IFPI)	7
Czech Republic Singles Digital (ČNS IFPI)	3
Denmark (Tracklisten)	3
Dominican Republic (SODINPRO)	46
Finland (Suomen virallinen lista)	5
France (SNEP)	77
Germany (GfK)	17
Germany Airplay (BVMI)	1
Global 200 (Billboard)	49
Hungary (Rádiós Top 40)	7
Hungary (Single Top 40)	11
Hungary (Stream Top 40)	4
Iceland (Tónlistinn)	1
Ireland (IRMA)	2
Israel Airplay (Media Forest)	13
Italy (FIMI)	20
Japan Hot 100 (Billboard)	81
Latvia (LaIPA)	2
Lebanon (Lebanese Top 20)	15
Lithuania (AGATA)	3
Malaysia (RIM)	1
Mexico Airplay (Billboard)	1
Netherlands (Dutch Top 40)	3
Netherlands (Single Top 100)	4
New Zealand (Recorded Music NZ)	1
Norway (VG-lista)	2
Paraguay (SGP)	38
Poland Airplay (ZPAV)	8
Portugal (AFP)	11
Puerto Rico (Monitor Latino)	11
Romania (Airplay 100)	10
Russia Airplay (TopHit)	8
San Marino (SMRRTV Top 50)	6
Scottish Singles Sales (Official Charts)	7
Singapore (RIAS)	2
Slovakia Airplay (ČNS IFPI)	3
Slovakia Singles Digital (ČNS IFPI)	2
Slovenia (SloTop50)	4
South Korea (Gaon)	138
Spain (Promusicae)	61
Sweden (Sverigetopplistan)	7
Switzerland (Schweizer Hitparade)	10
UK Singles (Official Charts)	3
Ukraine Airplay (TopHit)	99
US Billboard Hot 100	1
US Adult Contemporary (Billboard)	1
US Adult Pop Airplay (Billboard)	1
US Dance Club Songs (Billboard)	31
US Dance Airplay (Billboard)	2
US Pop Airplay (Billboard)	1
US Rhythmic Airplay (Billboard)	10
US Rock & Alternative Airplay (Billboard)	22
US Rolling Stone Top 100	1

=== Monthly charts ===
Monthly chart performance for "Circles"
Chart (2019)	Peak position
Latvia Airplay (LaIPA)	2

=== Year-end charts ===
Chart (2019)	Position
Australia (ARIA)	20
Austria (Ö3 Austria Top 40)	34
Belgium (Ultratop Flanders)	68
Canada (Canadian Hot 100)	49
Denmark (Tracklisten)	35
Germany (Official German Charts)	86
Iceland (Tónlistinn)	15
Ireland (IRMA)	29
Latvia (LAIPA)	27
Netherlands (Dutch Top 40)	22
Netherlands (Single Top 100)	32
New Zealand (Recorded Music NZ)	37
Paraguay (SGP)	38
Poland (ZPAV)	71
Portugal (AFP)	82
Sweden (Sverigetopplistan)	71
Switzerland (Schweizer Hitparade)	72
Tokyo (Tokio Hot 100)	12
UK Singles (OCC)	66
US Billboard Hot 100	62
US Mainstream Top 40 (Billboard)	33
US Rolling Stone Top 100	22

Chart (2020)	Position
Argentina Airplay (Monitor Latino)	40
Australia (ARIA)	7
Austria (Ö3 Austria Top 40)	49
Belgium (Ultratop Flanders)	31
Brazil Airplay (Crowley)	77
Canada (Canadian Hot 100)	5
Denmark (Tracklisten)	40
Germany (Official German Charts)	97
Hungary (Rádiós Top 40)	67
Hungary (Single Top 40)	77
Hungary (Stream Top 40)	44
Ireland (IRMA)	28
Netherlands (Dutch Top 40)	82
Netherlands (Single Top 100)	56
New Zealand (Recorded Music NZ)	20
Romania (Airplay 100)	80
Sweden (Sverigetopplistan)	85
Switzerland (Schweizer Hitparade)	53
UK Singles (OCC)	50
US Billboard Hot 100	2
US Adult Contemporary (Billboard)	3
US Adult Top 40 (Billboard)	1
US Dance/Mix Show Airplay (Billboard)	9
US Mainstream Top 40 (Billboard)	3

Chart (2021)	Position
Australia (ARIA)	66
Global 200 (Billboard)	61
Portugal (AFP)	114
US Adult Contemporary (Billboard)	14

Chart (2022)	Position
Australia (ARIA)	79
Global 200 (Billboard)	72

Chart (2023)	Position
Australia (ARIA)	87
Global 200 (Billboard)	105

=== All-time charts ===
Chart	Position
US Billboard Hot 100	19

== Certifications ==
Region	Certification	Certified units/sales
Australia (ARIA)	16× Platinum	1,120,000^{‡}
Austria (IFPI Austria)	Platinum	30,000^{‡}
Belgium (BRMA)	Platinum	40,000^{‡}
Brazil (Pro-Música Brasil)	4× Diamond	640,000^{‡}
Canada (Music Canada)	Diamond	800,000^{‡}
Denmark (IFPI Danmark)	3× Platinum	270,000^{‡}
France (SNEP)	Diamond	333,333^{‡}
Germany (BVMI)	Platinum	600,000^{‡}
Italy (FIMI)	2× Platinum	140,000^{‡}
New Zealand (RMNZ)	9× Platinum	270,000^{‡}
Poland (ZPAV)	3× Platinum	150,000^{‡}
Portugal (AFP)	6× Platinum	150,000^{‡}
Spain (Promusicae)	2× Platinum	120,000^{‡}
United Kingdom (BPI)	4× Platinum	2,400,000^{‡}
United States (RIAA)	Diamond	10,000,000^{‡}
^{‡} Sales+streaming figures based on certification alone.

== Release history ==
Region	Date	Format	Label	Ref.
Various	August 30, 2019	Digital download; streaming	Republic	
United States	September 3, 2019	Contemporary hit radio	Republic	
United States	September 16, 2019	Hot adult contemporary	Republic	
Various	November 7, 2019	7-inch single; CD single; cassette single	Republic	

== See also ==
- List of Billboard Adult Contemporary number ones of 2020
- List of Billboard Hot 100 number-one singles of 2019
- List of Billboard Hot 100 number-one singles of 2020
- List of Billboard Mexico Airplay number ones
- List of highest-certified singles in Australia
- List of number-one singles from the 2010s (New Zealand)
- List of number-one songs of 2019 (Malaysia)
