= Hollywood's Bleeding =

2019 studio album by Post Malone

Studio album by Post Malone
- Released: September 6, 2019
- Recorded: June 2018 – July 2019
- Studios: Crosby (Burbank); Electric Feel (West Hollywood); Germano; Jungle City (New York City); Gold Tooth Music (Beverly Hills); Miloco The Pool (United Kingdom); SARM (London)
- Genres: Pop; hip-hop
- Length: 50:56
- Label: Republic
- Producers: Andrew Watt; BloodPop; Brian Lee; Carter Lang; DJ Dahi; Emile Haynie; Frank Dukes; Happy Perez; Jahaan Sweet; Louis Bell; Matt Tavares; Nick Mira; Post Malone; Wallis Lane

Post Malone chronology
Beerbongs & Bentleys (2018)	Hollywood's Bleeding (2019)	Twelve Carat Toothache (2022)

Singles from Hollywood's Bleeding
- 1. "Wow" Released: December 24, 2018; 2. "Goodbyes" Released: July 5, 2019; 3. "Circles" Released: August 30, 2019; 4. "Enemies" Released: September 17, 2019; 5. "Allergic" Released: September 24, 2019; 6. "Take What You Want" Released: October 15, 2019

Hollywood's Bleeding is the third studio album by the American musician Post Malone. It was released on September 6, 2019, by Republic Records. The album features guest appearances from DaBaby, Future, Halsey, Meek Mill, Lil Baby, Ozzy Osbourne, Travis Scott, SZA, Swae Lee, and Young Thug. The production was handled mainly by Louis Bell, with contributions by Andrew Watt, BloodPop, Brian Lee, Carter Lang, DJ Dahi, Emile Haynie, Frank Dukes, and Malone himself, among others.

Hollywood's Bleeding debuted at number one on the US Billboard 200 with 489,000 album-equivalent units, of which 200,000 were pure album sales, giving Malone his second US number-one album. It was supported by six singles: "Wow", "Goodbyes", "Circles", "Enemies", "Allergic", and "Take What You Want". The first three singles peaked at number two, three, and one on the US Billboard Hot 100, respectively. The album also includes the Hot 100 number-one single, "Sunflower", a collaboration with American rapper Swae Lee, from the Spider-Man: Into the Spider-Verse soundtrack.

Hollywood's Bleeding was a drastic improvement in critical reception compared to Malone's previous two albums, receiving widely positive reviews. It was nominated for Album of the Year at the 2021 Grammy Awards. In 2022, it was certified quadruple platinum in the US.

== Background ==
On June 5, 2018, six weeks after the release of his second studio album Beerbongs & Bentleys, it was reported that Post Malone was working on his third studio album. That November, Malone stated that he was "trying to put out a new body of work" before the end of the year, but only released the single "Wow" in that time. On July 28, 2019, Malone shared that he had finished recording his upcoming third studio album, describing it as "pretty goddamn out of sight".

== Promotion ==
=== Singles ===
The album's lead single, "Wow", was released on December 24, 2018, one day before Christmas. The song was produced by Louis Bell and Frank Dukes. It peaked at number two on the US Billboard Hot 100.

The album's second single, "Goodbyes" featuring Young Thug, was released on July 5, 2019, one day after Malone's birthday. The song was produced by Brian Lee and Louis Bell. It peaked at number three on the Billboard Hot 100.

The album's third single, "Circles", was released for digital download on August 30, 2019. It was later sent to contemporary hit radio on September 3, 2019. The song was produced by Malone himself, Louis Bell, and Frank Dukes. It peaked at number one on the Billboard Hot 100.

"Enemies" featuring DaBaby, was sent to rhythmic contemporary radio on September 17, 2019, as the album's fourth single. It peaked at number 16 on the Billboard Hot 100.

"Allergic" was sent to alternative radio on September 24, 2019, as the album's fifth single. It peaked at number 37 on the Billboard Hot 100.

"Take What You Want" featuring Ozzy Osbourne and Travis Scott, was sent to contemporary hit radio on October 15, 2019, as the album's sixth single. It peaked at number eight on the Billboard Hot 100.

=== Other songs ===
A music video for the track "Saint-Tropez" was released on September 11, 2019. The song peaked at number 18 on the Billboard Hot 100.

Halsey released her own solo version of the album's seventh track, "Die for Me" in February 2023.

=== Tour ===
To further promote the album, Post announced the Runaway Tour with Swae Lee and Tyla Yaweh joining as the opening acts. The tour had two North American legs, and began September 14, 2019, in Tacoma, Washington and concluded March 12, 2020, in Denver.

== Critical reception ==
Professional ratings
Aggregate scores
Source	Rating
AnyDecentMusic?	6.9/10
Metacritic	79/100
Review scores
Source	Rating
AllMusic	4/5 stars
Clash	7/10
Consequence	B−
HipHopDX	3.4/5
HotNewHipHop	71%
NME	4/5 stars
Pitchfork	6.8/10
RapReviews	7/10
Rolling Stone	4/5 stars
Tom Hull – on the Web	B

According to the review aggregator Metacritic, Hollywood's Bleeding received "generally favorable reviews" based on a weighted average score of 79 out of 100 from ten critic scores. Aggregator AnyDecentMusic? gave it 6.9 out of 10, based on their assessment of the critical consensus.

Danny Wright of NME gave the album a positive review, saying "he's able to skillfully cherry pick from different genres[, ...] But Post Malone is the post everything star the kids have called for, a musician made for the internet-age; a goofball chameleon instinctively skilled at understanding the ways genres can merge together. These are albums made as playlists that skip seamlessly between styles". Reviewing the album for Variety, A. D. Amorosi said the album was a blend of "country, rock, hip-hop and modern soft soul" and that Malone gives the album a "refined trap-pop vibe". Neil Z. Yeung of AllMusic said "More well-executed than his previous releases and undeniably catchy, Hollywood's Bleeding is a huge step forward for the guarded superstar, one that doesn't sacrifice the essential elements that made him such a surprise hitmaker, and pushes him even further into the pop-savvy landscape where he belongs". Writing for Los Angeles Times, Mikael Wood stated, "Unlike Stoney and Beerbongs & Bentleys, this album feels composed of discrete stylistic exercises; no longer is he boiling down rap and rock and a little bit of country into a kind of smearable paste". Rolling Stone's critic Nick Catucci said, "Post Malone curates as much as he creates, and there's not a misplaced feature among the 10 spread across seven of these tracks".

Dan Weiss of Consequence wrote, "Hollywood's Bleeding is immediately Post Malone's most listenable work and may well be the catchiest album you hear in 2019, and that includes Taylor Swift". Daniel Spielberger of HipHopDX said, "Besides a few questionable features, there's nothing offensive or particularly bad about Hollywood's Bleeding. It's just Malone playing it safe and betting on the likelihood that the streaming algorithms will reward him once again". Jason Greene from Pitchfork stated, "When he's not wasting time trying to glower, he proves himself surprisingly versatile. ... There are a lot of guests on Hollywood's Bleeding, and all of them sound engaged".

=== Year-end lists ===
Select year-end rankings of Hollywood's Bleeding
Publication	List	Rank	Ref.
Billboard	50 Best Albums of 2019	13	
Complex	Best Albums of 2019	46	
NME	The 50 Best Albums of 2019	20	
Rolling Stone	50 Best Albums of 2019	47	
Uproxx	The Best Albums of 2019	41	

=== Industry awards ===
Awards and nominations for Hollywood's Bleeding
Year	Ceremony	Category	Result	Ref.
2019	American Music Awards	Favorite Album – Rap/Hip-Hop	Won	
2020	Billboard Music Awards	Top Billboard 200 Album	Nominated	
2020	Billboard Music Awards	Top Rap Album	Won	
2020	Juno Awards	International Album of the Year	Nominated	
2021	Grammy Awards	Album of the Year	Nominated	

== Commercial performance ==
Hollywood's Bleeding debuted at number one on the US Billboard 200 with 489,000 album-equivalent units, of which 200,000 were pure album sales, giving Post Malone his second US number-one album. It also marks the second-biggest week of 2019 for an album only behind Taylor Swift's Lover, and biggest in terms of streams. By the end of 2019 the album had sold 357,000 pure copies out of a sales total of 3.001 million combined units. Hollywood's Bleeding was the sixth best selling album of 2020 with 1.895 million album-equivalent units in the United States.

== Track listing ==
Hollywood's Bleeding track listing
No.	Title	Writer(s)	Producer(s)	Length
1.	"Hollywood's Bleeding"	Austin Post; Louis Bell; Brian Lee; Billy Walsh; Carter Lang	Bell; Lee	2:36
2.	"Saint-Tropez"	Post; Adam Feeney; Jahaan Sweet; Paimon Jahanbin; Nima Jahanbin; Bell; Walsh	Frank Dukes; Sweet; Wallis Lane	2:30
3.	"Enemies" (featuring DaBaby)	Post; Jonathan Kirk; Bell; Walsh	Bell	3:16
4.	"Allergic"	Post; Bell; Lee; Walsh	Bell; Lee	2:36
5.	"A Thousand Bad Times"	Post; Bell; Feeney; Walsh; Kaan Gunesberk	Bell; Frank Dukes	3:41
6.	"Circles"	Post; Bell; Feeney; Walsh; Gunesberk	Bell; Post Malone; Frank Dukes	3:34
7.	"Die for Me" (featuring Future and Halsey)	Post; Nayvadius Wilburn; Ashley Frangipane; Bell; Andrew Watt; Nathan Perez; Walsh	Bell; Happy Perez; Watt	4:05
8.	"On the Road" (featuring Meek Mill and Lil Baby)	Post; Robert Williams; Dominique Jones; Bell; Nicholas Mira; Walsh; Tavoris Hollins, Jr.	Bell; Nick Mira	3:38
9.	"Take What You Want" (featuring Ozzy Osbourne and Travis Scott)	Post; John Osbourne; Jacques Webster II; Bell; Watt; Walsh	Bell; Watt	3:49
10.	"I'm Gonna Be"	Post; Bell; Walsh	Bell	3:20
11.	"Staring at the Sun" (featuring SZA)	Post; Solána Rowe; Bell; Feeney; Walsh; Matt Tavares; Seth Nyquist	Bell; Frank Dukes; Tavares	2:48
12.	"Sunflower" (with Swae Lee; from Spider-Man: Into the Spider-Verse)	Post; Khalif Brown; Bell; Lang; Walsh	Bell; Lang	2:38
13.	"Internet"	Post; Kanye West; Dacoury Natche; Michael Tucker; Bell	Bell; DJ Dahi; BloodPop	2:03
14.	"Goodbyes" (featuring Young Thug)	Post; Jeffery Williams; Lee; Bell; Walsh; Val Blavatnik; Jessie Foutz	Bell; Lee	2:56
15.	"Myself"	Post; Joshua Tillman; Bell; Feeney; Emile Haynie	Bell; Frank Dukes; Haynie	2:38
16.	"I Know"	Post; Bell; Walsh	Bell	2:21
17.	"Wow"	Post; Bell; Feeney; Walsh; Anthoine Walters	Bell; Frank Dukes	2:29
Total length:				50:56

Notes

- "Wow" is stylized as "Wow."

== Personnel ==
Musicians

- Post Malone – lead vocals (all tracks)
- Kaan Güneşberk – programming, all instruments (tracks 5, 6)
- Anthoine Walters – background vocals (track 13)
- BloodPop – background vocals (track 17)

Technical

- Louis Bell – recording (all tracks), vocal production (all tracks)
- Simon Todkill – recording (track 4)
- Paul LaMalfa – recording (tracks 7, 9)
- Anthony Cruz – recording (tracks 8, 10)
- A. Bainz – recording (track 14)
- Shaan Singh – recording (track 14)
- Dave Rowland – recording (track 15)
- Manny Marroquin – mixing (all tracks)
- Chris Galland – mixing assistance (all tracks)
- Robin Florent – mixing assistance (all tracks)
- Scott Desmarais – mixing assistance (all tracks)
- Jeremie Inhaber – mixing assistance (all tracks)
- Mike Bozzi – mastering (all tracks)

== Charts ==
=== Weekly charts ===
Chart performance for Hollywood's Bleeding
Chart (2019–2020)	Peak position
Australian Albums (ARIA)	1
Austrian Albums (Ö3 Austria)	5
Belgian Albums (Ultratop Flanders)	1
Belgian Albums (Ultratop Wallonia)	12
Canadian Albums (Billboard)	1
Czech Albums (ČNS IFPI)	1
Danish Albums (Hitlisten)	1
Dutch Albums (Album Top 100)	1
Estonian Albums (Eesti Ekspress)	1
Finnish Albums (Suomen virallinen lista)	1
French Albums (SNEP)	11
German Albums (Offizielle Top 100)	7
Irish Albums (IRMA)	1
Italian Albums (FIMI)	3
Japan Hot Albums (Billboard Japan)	93
Japanese Albums (Oricon)	81
Latvian Albums (LAIPA)	1
Lithuanian Albums (AGATA)	1
New Zealand Albums (RMNZ)	1
Norwegian Albums (VG-lista)	1
Polish Albums (ZPAV)	18
Portuguese Albums (AFP)	11
Scottish Albums (Official Charts)	10
Slovak Albums (IFPI)	1
South Korean Albums (Gaon)	85
Spanish Albums (Promusicae)	51
Swedish Albums (Sverigetopplistan)	3
Swiss Albums (Schweizer Hitparade)	3
UK Albums (Official Charts)	1
US Billboard 200	1
US Top R&B/Hip-Hop Albums (Billboard)	1

=== Year-end charts ===
2019 year-end chart performance for Hollywood's Bleeding
Chart (2019)	Position
Australian Albums (ARIA)	8
Austrian Albums (Ö3 Austria)	34
Belgian Albums (Ultratop Flanders)	22
Belgian Albums (Ultratop Wallonia)	145
Canadian Albums (Billboard)	6
Danish Albums (Hitlisten)	6
Dutch Albums (Album Top 100)	5
French Albums (SNEP)	122
Icelandic Albums (Tónlistinn)	16
Irish Albums (IRMA)	18
Italian Albums (FIMI)	70
New Zealand Albums (RMNZ)	13
Norwegian Albums (VG-lista)	4
Swedish Albums (Sverigetopplistan)	12
Swiss Albums (Schweizer Hitparade)	50
UK Albums (OCC)	20
US Billboard 200	9
US Top R&B/Hip-Hop Albums (Billboard)	5
US Rolling Stone 200	4

2020 year-end chart performance for Hollywood's Bleeding
Chart (2020)	Position
Australian Albums (ARIA)	7
Austrian Albums (Ö3 Austria)	26
Belgian Albums (Ultratop Flanders)	27
Belgian Albums (Ultratop Wallonia)	115
Canadian Albums (Billboard)	1
Danish Albums (Hitlisten)	9
Dutch Albums (Album Top 100)	10
French Albums (SNEP)	152
German Albums (Offizielle Top 100)	98
Icelandic Albums (Tónlistinn)	12
Irish Albums (IRMA)	17
Italian Albums (FIMI)	60
New Zealand Albums (RMNZ)	10
Norwegian Albums (VG-lista)	8
Spanish Albums (PROMUSICAE)	90
Swedish Albums (Sverigetopplistan)	15
Swiss Albums (Schweizer Hitparade)	73
UK Albums (OCC)	15
US Billboard 200	1
US Top R&B/Hip-Hop Albums (Billboard)	1

2021 year-end chart performance for Hollywood's Bleeding
Chart (2021)	Position
Australian Albums (ARIA)	38
Austrian Albums (Ö3 Austria)	37
Belgian Albums (Ultratop Flanders)	67
Canadian Albums (Billboard)	12
Danish Albums (Hitlisten)	32
Dutch Albums (Album Top 100)	37
Icelandic Albums (Tónlistinn)	51
Norwegian Albums (VG-lista)	22
Swedish Albums (Sverigetopplistan)	58
UK Albums (OCC)	62
US Billboard 200	13
US Top R&B/Hip-Hop Albums (Billboard)	6

2022 year-end chart performance for Hollywood's Bleeding
Chart (2022)	Position
Australian Albums (ARIA)	57
Belgian Albums (Ultratop Flanders)	125
Canadian Albums (Billboard)	24
Danish Albums (Hitlisten)	54
Dutch Albums (Album Top 100)	60
US Billboard 200	20
US Top R&B/Hip-Hop Albums (Billboard)	10

2023 year-end chart performance for Hollywood's Bleeding
Chart (2023)	Position
Australian Albums (ARIA)	71
Belgian Albums (Ultratop Flanders)	93
Canadian Albums (Billboard)	43
Danish Albums (Hitlisten)	61
Dutch Albums (Album Top 100)	50
Icelandic Albums (Tónlistinn)	98
US Billboard 200	35
US Top R&B/Hip-Hop Albums (Billboard)	14

2024 year-end chart performance for Hollywood's Bleeding
Chart (2024)	Position
Australian Hip Hop/R&B Albums (ARIA)	36
Belgian Albums (Ultratop Flanders)	134
Danish Albums (Hitlisten)	98
US Top R&B/Hip-Hop Albums (Billboard)	62

2025 year-end chart performance for Hollywood's Bleeding
Chart (2025)	Position
US Billboard 200	184
US Top R&B/Hip-Hop Albums (Billboard)	54

== Certifications ==
Certifications for Hollywood's Bleeding
Region	Certification	Certified units/sales
Australia (ARIA)	2× Platinum	140,000^{‡}
Brazil (Pro-Música Brasil)	3× Platinum	120,000^{‡}
Canada (Music Canada)	8× Platinum	640,000^{‡}
Denmark (IFPI Danmark)	5× Platinum	100,000^{‡}
France (SNEP)	Platinum	100,000^{‡}
Germany (BVMI)	Gold	100,000^{‡}
Iceland (FHF)	—	3,663
Italy (FIMI)	2× Platinum	100,000^{‡}
New Zealand (RMNZ)	5× Platinum	75,000^{‡}
Poland (ZPAV)	3× Platinum	60,000^{‡}
Portugal (AFP)	Platinum	7,000^{‡}
Singapore (RIAS)	2× Platinum	20,000^{*}
United Kingdom (BPI)	2× Platinum	600,000^{‡}
United States (RIAA)	4× Platinum	4,000,000^{‡}
^{*} Sales figures based on certification alone.^{‡} Sales+streaming figures based on certification alone.
