= Sunflower (Post Malone and Swae Lee song) =

Single by Post Malone and Swae Lee

from the album Spider-Man: Into the Spider-Verse (Soundtrack from & Inspired by the Motion Picture)
- Released: October 18, 2018
- Genre: Dream pop; hip-hop; chillwave; R&B
- Length: 2:38
- Label: Republic
- Songwriters: Austin Post; Khalif Brown; Carl Rosen; Carter Lang; Louis Bell; William Walsh
- Producers: Carter Lang; Louis Bell

Post Malone singles chronology
"Better Now" (2018)	"Sunflower" (2018)	"Wow" (2018)

Swae Lee singles chronology
"Real Friends" (2018)	"Sunflower" (2018)	"Close to Me" (2018)

Music video
- "Sunflower" on YouTube

"Sunflower" (Note: Alternatively subtitled "(Spider Man: Into the Spider-Verse)") is a song by American musicians Post Malone and Swae Lee. It was released on October 18, 2018, as a single from the soundtrack to the 2018 animated film Spider-Man: Into the Spider-Verse, and was later included on Post Malone's third studio album Hollywood's Bleeding (2019). An official remix features fellow American singers Nicky Jam and Prince Royce.

"Sunflower" received universal acclaim from music critics. It became Malone's third and Lee's first song as a soloist to peak the US Billboard Hot 100 chart. The song ranked in the top ten of the chart for 33 weeks, at the time sharing the record for the most such weeks with "Girls Like You" by Maroon 5 featuring Cardi B and "Shape of You" by Ed Sheeran (Post Malone then broke this record with his 2019 single "Circles"). "Sunflower" also reached number one in Australia, Canada, Malaysia, and New Zealand, as well as the top ten in 12 additional countries. It has received double diamond (20-times platinum) certification by the Recording Industry Association of America (RIAA) in the US, as well as diamond in Canada, Australia, and Mexico. By December 2023, it was set to become the first song to receive the certification in the United States—signifying 20 million units in sales; the certification was finalized in February 2024. The song was the fourth-best-selling R&B song of the 2010s decade in the US. On the Billboard Global 200 singles chart, the song peaked at number 20 upon the issue date of June 24, 2023.

"Sunflower" was nominated for Record of the Year and Best Pop Duo/Group Performance at the 62nd Annual Grammy Awards.

== Background ==
Malone confirmed his involvement with Spider-Man: Into the Spider-Verse on October 2, 2018, on The Tonight Show Starring Jimmy Fallon, in which he announced that he wrote "Sunflower", which he also performs, and played a snippet of the song. On October 15, Swae Lee revealed that he would also be on the song with Malone, and released another snippet of the song. Lee said that he was "very excited" for people to listen to the song. On October 19, 2018, "Sunflower" was released as a single. Spring Aspers, head of music and creative affairs at Sony Pictures, said that "Post and Swae have delivered a song that's both heroic and emotional, which is exactly what a Spider-Man story needs. It's anthemic, but also heartfelt — the perfect soundtrack for Miles to discover the Spider-Man inside himself". Swae Lee called "Sunflower" one of his favorite collaborations in 2018, when he stated it was "because it's a movie placement [in Spider-Man: Into the Spider-Verse]. The main character sings "Sunflower" and uses my vocals to calm him down in a certain situation—like my music was therapeutic for him". Malone and Lee previously collaborated on the song "Spoil My Night" for Malone's 2018 album Beerbongs & Bentleys.

== Music video ==
On October 19, 2018, a lyric video of the song was released. The video is composed of computer-animated footage from the film. The lyrics are presented in the comic book style of the film, edited into the context of various scenes, such as graffiti scrawled by Miles Morales. As of October 2026, the lyric video has received over 3.1 billion views on YouTube.

On January 10, 2019, an official music video of the song was released, which is live action. The video contains an exclusive look at the recording session for the song showing the film logo behind Malone and Lee and a live performance. By 2023, the video had over 78 million views on YouTube.

== Critical reception ==
In Billboard, Gil Kaufman called it "a funky, dreamy ballad" after listening to a preview of the song. Israel Daramola from Spin called "Sunflower" a "glitchy, soulful record" that "will appeal to fans of the more melodic songs made by Post and Swae Lee, as they commit to full crooning throughout. It's a short and sweet, hazy little pop song that makes sense for a kid's film or possibly an MTV show about California teens". Patrick Doyle of Rolling Stone characterized the "hyper-catchy" song as "a diary of a rocky relationship, which walks the line between hip-hop and dream-pop".

== Commercial performance ==
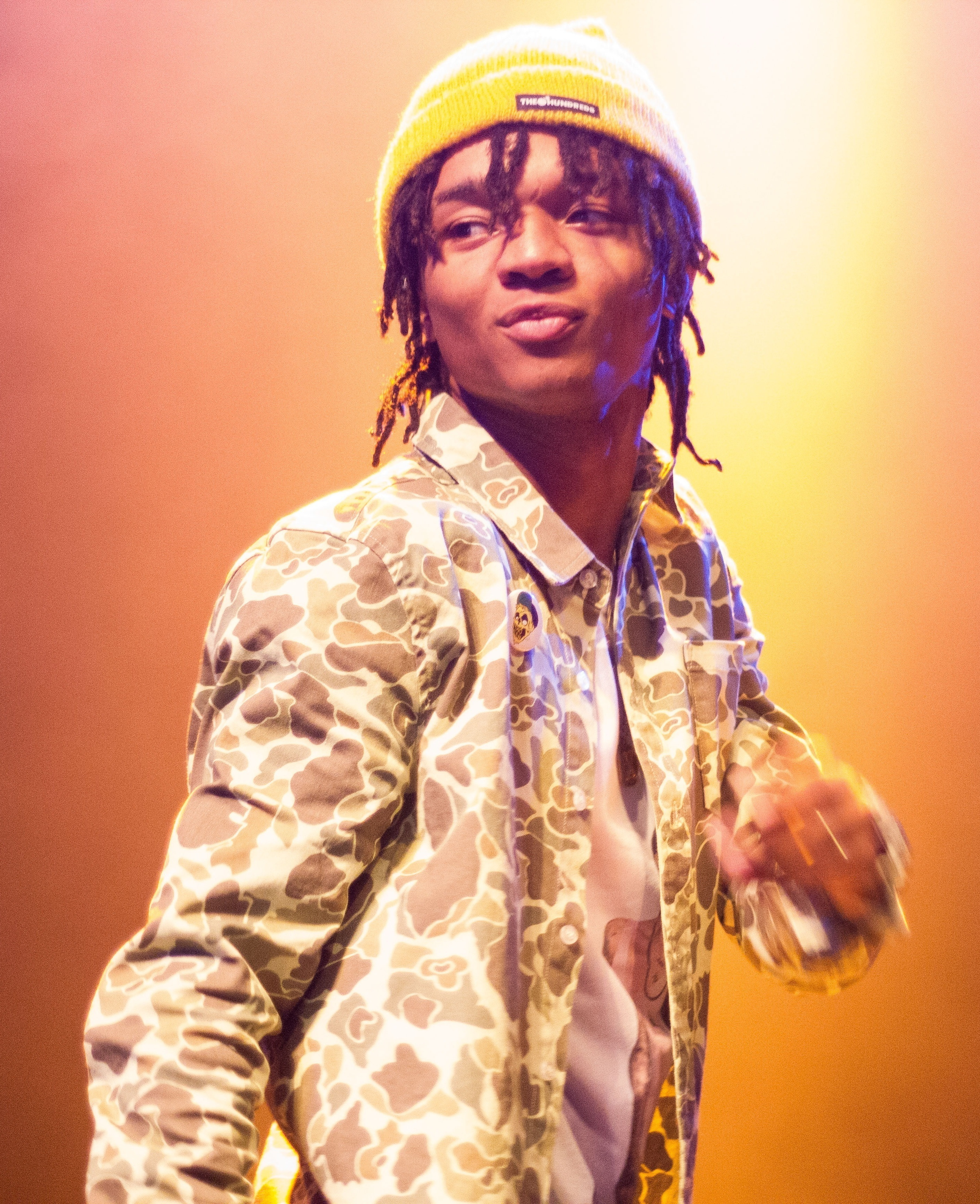
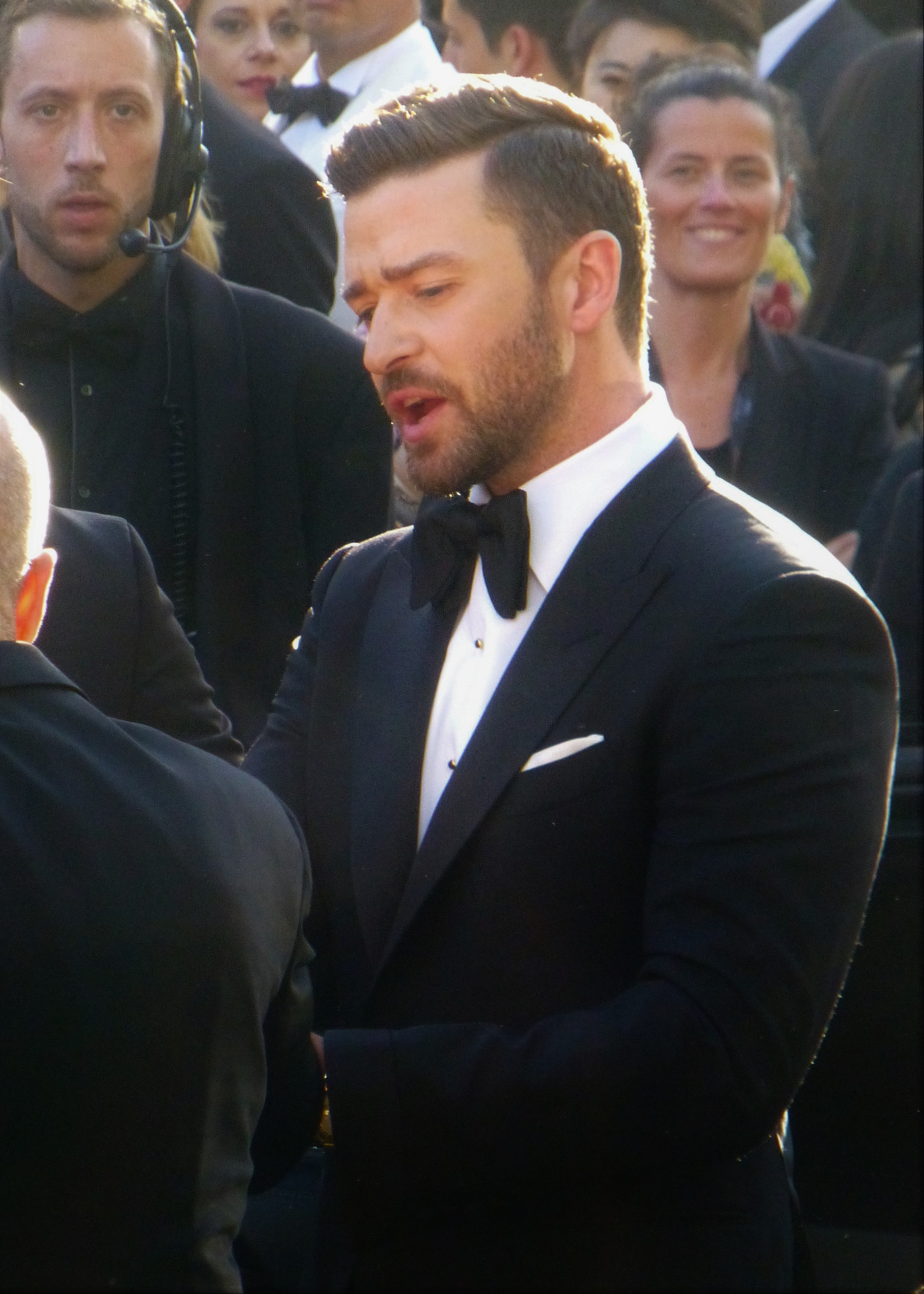
Swae Lee (left) became the first artist to top the Hot 100 as a solo artist in a lead credit after reigning with a duo or group, since Justin Timberlake in 2016.

"Sunflower" debuted at number nine on the US Billboard Hot 100. After spending three weeks in the top five, it reached number one on the chart issue dated January 19, 2019, rising from number three the previous week. It became Post Malone's third and Swae Lee's first song as a soloist to top the chart. "Sunflower" is the first song from a soundtrack to reach the top of the Hot 100 since Justin Timberlake's "Can't Stop the Feeling!" from the Trolls soundtrack (2016). Additionally, "Sunflower" is the highest-charting song from a Spider-Man franchise soundtrack, passing Chad Kroeger's "Hero", featuring Josey Scott, from Music from and Inspired by Spider-Man, which reached number three in 2002. "Sunflower" also marks the first Hot 100 number one by two co-billed male leads with no other accompanying acts since George Michael and Elton John's "Don't Let the Sun Go Down on Me" (1992). Due to the large airplay lead of "Without Me" by Halsey, "Sunflower" descended to number two the following week. It continuously shuffled within the top five the following four months, going so far as to return to the runner-up spot in March and April. The song spent 33 non-consecutive weeks in the top ten of the Hot 100, tying both Ed Sheeran's "Shape of You" and Maroon 5's "Girls Like You", featuring Cardi B, for the longest top 10 run in the chart's archives. Malone's "Circles" broke the mentioned record in 2020, spending 38 consecutive weeks in the top 10. "Sunflower" topped the Canadian Hot 100 for two consecutive weeks.

According to the IFPI, "Sunflower" was the fourth most successful song of 2019, selling 13.4 million global equivalents-units. In the US, according to Nielsen Soundscan, it was the second-best performing R&B/hip-hop song of 2019, with 6.3 million equivalent units, including 668,000 digital downloads, and the fourth-best performing song on radio on that format.

== Awards and nominations ==
Year	Ceremony	Category	Result	Ref.
2019	American Music Awards	Collaboration of the Year	Nominated	
2019	American Music Awards	Favorite Song — Pop/Rock	Nominated	
2019	Clio Awards	Animation	Bronze	
2019	Guild of Music Supervisors Awards	Best Song/Recording Created for a Film	Nominated	
2019	Melon Music Awards	Best OST	Nominated	
2019	MTV Europe Music Awards	Best Song	Nominated	
2019	Teen Choice Awards	Choice Song: R&B/Hip-Hop	Nominated	
2019	Teen Choice Awards	Choice Song From a Movie	Nominated	
2020	Grammy Awards	Record of the Year	Nominated	
2020	Grammy Awards	Best Pop Duo/Group Performance	Nominated	
2020	Billboard Music Awards	Top Streaming Song	Nominated	
2020	Billboard Music Awards	Top Collaboration	Nominated	
2020	Billboard Music Awards	Top Rap Song	Nominated	

== Charts ==
=== Weekly charts ===
Chart (2018–2024)	Peak position
Argentina Hot 100 (Billboard)	51
Australia (ARIA)	1
Austria (Ö3 Austria Top 40)	19
Belgium (Ultratop 50 Flanders)	15
Belgium (Ultratop 50 Wallonia)	14
Brazil Airplay (Top 100 Brasil)	87
Canada Hot 100 (Billboard)	1
Canada CHR/Top 40 (Billboard)	2
China Airplay/FL (Billboard)	22
Croatia International Airplay (Top lista)	44
Czech Republic Airplay (ČNS IFPI)	17
Czech Republic Singles Digital (ČNS IFPI)	7
Denmark (Tracklisten)	3
Estonia (Eesti Tipp-40)	4
Finland (Suomen virallinen lista)	8
France (SNEP)	63
Germany (GfK)	36
Global 200 (Billboard)	20
Hungary (Stream Top 40)	5
Ireland (IRMA)	3
Italy (FIMI)	33
Latvia Streaming (LaIPA)	6
Lithuania (AGATA)	3
Malaysia (RIM)	1
Mexico Airplay (Billboard)	1
Netherlands (Dutch Top 40)	19
Netherlands (Single Top 100)	33
New Zealand (Recorded Music NZ)	1
Norway (VG-lista)	6
Poland Airplay (ZPAV)	81
Portugal (AFP)	13
Puerto Rico Airplay (Monitor Latino)	10
Scottish Singles Sales (Official Charts)	15
Singapore (RIAS)	2
Slovakia Airplay (ČNS IFPI)	59
Slovakia Singles Digital (ČNS IFPI)	6
Spain (Promusicae)	96
Sweden (Sverigetopplistan)	4
Switzerland (Schweizer Hitparade)	22
UK Singles (Official Charts)	3
UK Hip Hop/R&B (Official Charts)	1
US Billboard Hot 100	1
US Adult Pop Airplay (Billboard)	29
US Dance Airplay (Billboard)	7
US Hot R&B/Hip-Hop Songs (Billboard)	1
US Pop Airplay (Billboard)	4
US Rhythmic Airplay (Billboard)	1
US Rolling Stone Top 100	6
Vietnam (Vietnam Hot 100)	55

2026 weekly chart performance for "Sunflower"
Chart (2026)	Peak position
Latvia Airplay (TopHit)	79
Malaysia (IFPI)	9
Panama Streaming (PRODUCE)	112
Philippines (IFPI)	15
Philippines Hot 100 (Billboard Philippines)	25
Poland Airplay (OLiS)	34
South Korea (Circle)	58
Thailand (Billboard)	14
Thailand (IFPI)	16

=== Year-end charts ===
Chart (2018)	Position
Australia (ARIA)	85
Chart (2019)	Position
Argentina (Monitor Latino)	81
Australia (ARIA)	4
Belgium (Ultratop Flanders)	94
Belgium (Ultratop Wallonia)	61
Canada (Canadian Hot 100)	2
Denmark (Tracklisten)	20
El Salvador (Monitor Latino)	21
France (SNEP)	148
Honduras (Monitor Latino)	43
Iceland (Tónlistinn)	56
Ireland (IRMA)	12
Latvia (LAIPA)	6
Malaysia (RIM)	3
Mexico (Monitor Latino)	9
Netherlands (Single Top 100)	100
New Zealand (Recorded Music NZ)	2
Nicaragua (Monitor Latino)	90
Norway (VG-lista)	34
Portugal (AFP)	32
Puerto Rico (Monitor Latino)	78
South Korea (Gaon)	196
Sweden (Sverigetopplistan)	20
Switzerland (Schweizer Hitparade)	74
UK Singles (OCC)	15
US Billboard Hot 100	2
US Dance/Mix Show Airplay (Billboard)	31
US Hot R&B/Hip-Hop Songs (Billboard)	2
US Mainstream Top 40 (Billboard)	14
US Rhythmic (Billboard)	3
US Rolling Stone Top 100	2
Chart (2020)	Position
Australia (ARIA)	47
UK Singles (OCC)	80
Chart (2021)	Position
Australia (ARIA)	67
Global 200 (Billboard)	41
UK Singles (OCC)	93
Chart (2022)	Position
Australia (ARIA)	51
Global 200 (Billboard)	47
US Streaming Songs (Billboard)	74
Chart (2023)	Position
Australia (ARIA)	42
Global 200 (Billboard)	47
New Zealand (Recorded Music NZ)	47
Chart (2024)	Position
Australia (ARIA)	77
Australia Hip Hop/R&B (ARIA)	12
Global 200 (Billboard)	48
Chart (2025)	Position
Global 200 (Billboard)	83

=== Decade-end charts ===
Chart (2010–2019)	Position
Australia (ARIA)	61
US Billboard Hot 100	11
US Hot R&B/Hip-Hop Songs (Billboard)	4

=== All-time charts ===
Chart (Note: As of November 2021)	Position
US Billboard Hot 100	75

== Certifications ==
Region	Certification	Certified units/sales
Australia (ARIA)	20× Platinum	1,400,000^{‡}
Belgium (BRMA)	Gold	20,000^{‡}
Brazil (Pro-Música Brasil)	5× Diamond	800,000^{‡}
Brazil (Pro-Música Brasil) F-1 Trillion Album Livestream	Diamond	160,000^{‡}
Canada (Music Canada)	Diamond	800,000^{‡}
Denmark (IFPI Danmark)	3× Platinum	270,000^{‡}
France (SNEP) with Swae Lee	Diamond	333,333^{‡}
France (SNEP) solo version	Gold	100,000^{‡}
Germany (BVMI)	Platinum	600,000^{‡}
Italy (FIMI)	2× Platinum	200,000^{‡}
Mexico (AMPROFON)	Diamond	300,000^{‡}
New Zealand (RMNZ)	12× Platinum	360,000^{‡}
Poland (ZPAV)	3× Platinum	150,000^{‡}
Portugal (AFP)	6× Platinum	150,000^{‡}
Spain (Promusicae)	2× Platinum	120,000^{‡}
United Kingdom (BPI)	6× Platinum	3,600,000^{‡}
United States (RIAA)	2× Diamond	20,000,000^{‡}
Streaming
Japan (RIAJ)	Gold	50,000,000^{†}
^{‡} Sales+streaming figures based on certification alone.^{†} Streaming-only figures based on certification alone.

== Release history ==
Region	Date	Format	Label	Ref.
Italy	October 19, 2018	Contemporary hit radio	Universal	
United States	October 23, 2018	Contemporary hit radio	Republic	
United States	October 23, 2018	Rhythmic contemporary radio	Republic	
United States	March 29, 2019	7-inch vinyl single	Republic	

== Other versions ==
- A remix of the song, featuring new lyrics performed by Nicky Jam and Prince Royce, was released on February 22, 2019, as a bonus track in a deluxe version of the soundtrack of Spider-Man: Into the Spider-Verse.
- American indie pop band Vampire Weekend covered "Sunflower" on BBC Radio 1's Live Lounge, in reference to their single of the same name from Father of the Bride (2019).
- For the sequel film, Spider-Man: Across the Spider-Verse, covers of the song in various styles and languages were done, officially released by Maddison Gate, most famously, Indian duo DJs Tech Panda & Kanzani and an Indian singer "Badal" remade the track to Indian musical traditions with Hindi vocals.

== See also ==
- List of best-selling singles in Australia
- List of highest-certified digital singles in the United States
- List of Billboard Hot 100 number-one singles of 2019
- List of Canadian Hot 100 number-one singles of 2019
- List of number-one singles of 2019 (Australia)
- List of number-one songs of 2018 (Malaysia)
