= Post Malone discography =

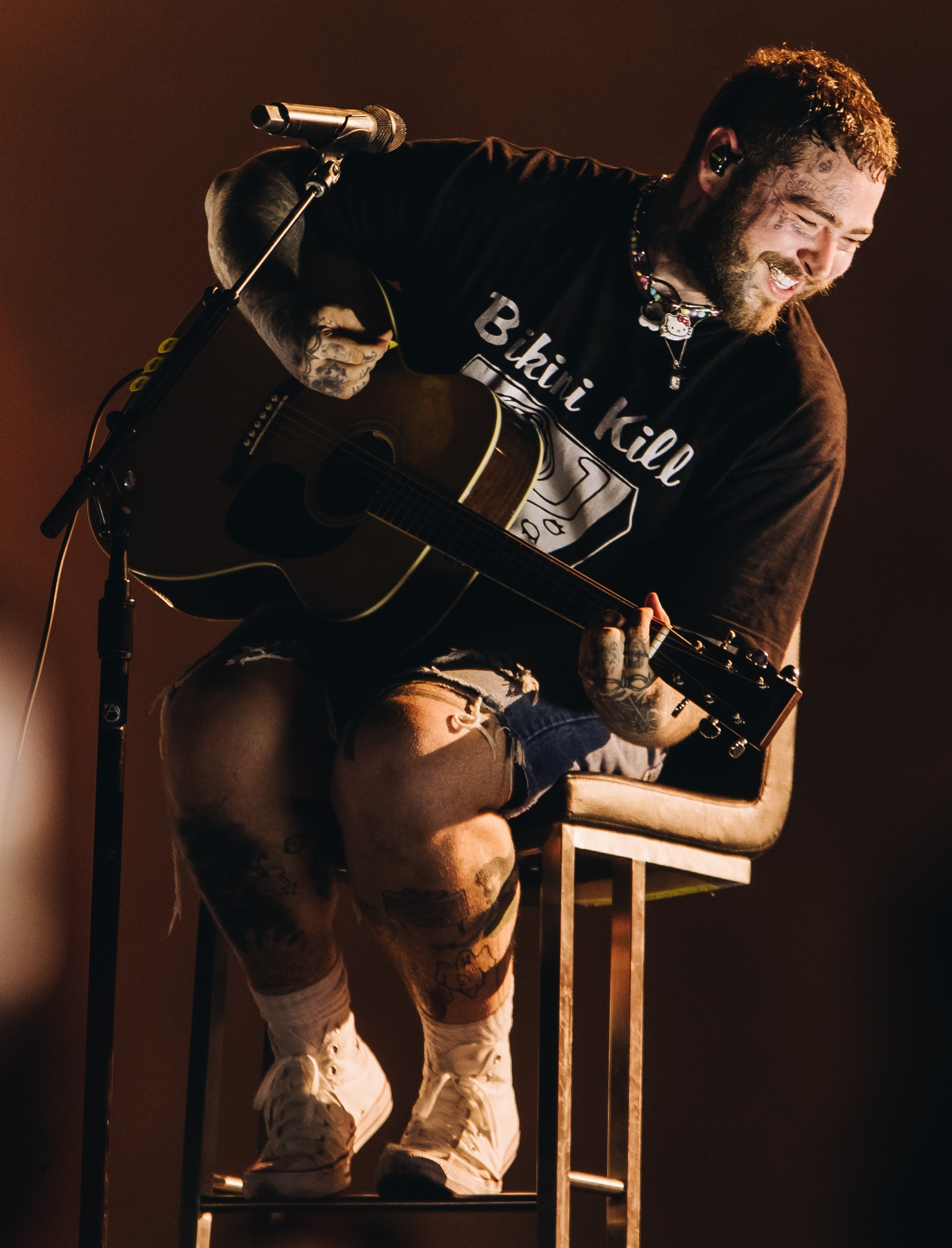
- Malone performing in 2021
- Studio albums: 6
- EPs: 1
- Live albums: 1
- Compilation albums: 1
- Singles: 43
- Music videos: 46
- Mixtapes: 3

American musician Post Malone has released six studio albums, three mixtapes, one live album, one compilation album, one extended play and 43 singles (including 13 as a featured artist), and 46 music videos. According to the Recording Industry Association of America (RIAA), he has sold 13 million albums in the United States and 95 million digital singles, making him the eighth best-selling digital artist of all time. Malone was ranked by Billboard as the tenth top artist of the 2010s. Following the release of August 26th (2016), Malone's debut studio album, Stoney (2016), peaked at number four on the US Billboard 200 and spawned the single "Congratulations" (featuring Quavo), which peaked at number eight on the US Billboard Hot 100; the album also included his top-20 debut single, "White Iverson", which peaked at number 14 on the Hot 100.

His second studio album, Beerbongs & Bentleys (2018), debuted atop the US Billboard 200, giving him his first chart-topping project. It also produced the number-one singles, "Rockstar" (featuring 21 Savage) and "Psycho" (featuring Ty Dolla Sign), respectively; as well as a top-five single, "Better Now", which peaked at number three on the Billboard Hot 100. The album also produced the top-20 single, "Ball for Me" (featuring Nicki Minaj). Later that same year, Malone released a collaboration with Swae Lee, "Sunflower", which topped the Hot 100 and became his third number-one single. His third studio album, Hollywood's Bleeding (2019), debuted atop the US Billboard 200, becoming his second chart-topping project. It also produced his fourth number-one single, "Circles", with "Sunflower", also appearing on the album. The album also produced the singles "Wow", "Goodbyes" (featuring Young Thug), and "Take What You Want" (featuring Ozzy Osbourne and Travis Scott), which peaked at numbers two, three, and eight on the US Billboard Hot 100, respectively. It also produced the top-20 single, "Enemies" (featuring DaBaby), which peaked at number 16 on the Hot 100, and the top-40 single, "Allergic". In 2020, Malone appeared, alongside Clever, on Justin Bieber's song, "Forever", which peaked at number 24 on the Hot 100. In 2021, he released the single, "Motley Crew", which peaked at number 13 on the Hot 100.

His fourth studio album, Twelve Carat Toothache (2022), debuted at number two on the US Billboard 200. It also produced two top-10 singles: "One Right Now" (with the Weeknd), which peaked at number six on the US Billboard Hot 100, and "I Like You (A Happier Song)" (featuring Doja Cat), which peaked at number three. It also produced the top-20 single, "Cooped Up" (featuring Roddy Ricch). His fifth studio album, Austin (2023), debuted at number two on the US Billboard 200 and produced the single "Chemical", which peaked at number 13 on the Billboard Hot 100. It also produced the top-40 single, "Mourning", which peaked at number 36 on the Hot 100. In 2024, Malone released a collaboration with Beyoncé titled "Levii's Jeans", which peaked at number 16 on the Hot 100. Later that same year, he guest appeared on Taylor Swift's single "Fortnight", which debuted atop the Hot 100, giving him his fifth number-one single.

On August 16, 2024, Malone released his sixth studio album, F-1 Trillion. The album spawned his sixth number-one single, "I Had Some Help" (featuring Morgan Wallen), which debuted atop the US Billboard Hot 100 in its first week. It also produced the top-20 singles, "Pour Me a Drink" (featuring Blake Shelton) and "Guy for That" (featuring Luke Combs), which debuted at numbers 12 and 17 on the Hot 100, respectively.

== Albums ==
=== Studio albums ===
List of studio albums, with release details, selected chart positions, sales and certifications
Title	Details	Peak chart positions										Sales	Certifications
Title	Details	US	AUS	CAN	DEN	IRE	NLD	NOR	NZ	SWE	UK	Sales	Certifications
Stoney	Released: December 9, 2016; Label: Republic; Formats: CD, LP, cassette, digital download, streaming	4	5	5	2	6	37	2	3	2	10	US: 303,902 (Note: The album debuted with 19,000 pure copies in its debut week in 2016 and sold 4,302 during its second week of release. During 2017 it sold 129,000 pure copies, over 89,000 copies during 2018, 28,000 copies in 2019 and 34,600 copies in 2020.)	RIAA: 5× Platinum; ARIA: 2× Platinum; BPI: 2× Platinum; GLF: Platinum; IFPI DEN: 4× Platinum; MC: 6× Platinum; RMNZ: 6× Platinum
Beerbongs & Bentleys	Released: April 27, 2018; Label: Republic; Formats: CD, LP, digital download, streaming	1	1	1	1	1	1	1	1	1	1	US: 472,000 (Note: During 2018, Beerbongs & Bentleys sold over 343,000 pure copies. It sold in addition 78,000 copies in 2019 and 51,000 copies in 2020.)	RIAA: 5× Platinum; ARIA: 3× Platinum; BPI: 2× Platinum; GLF: 2× Platinum; IFPI DEN: 6× Platinum; IFPI NOR: 3× Platinum; MC: 8× Platinum; NVPI: Platinum; RMNZ: 7× Platinum
Hollywood's Bleeding	Released: September 6, 2019; Label: Republic; Format: CD, LP, cassette, digital download, streaming	1	1	1	1	1	1	1	1	3	1	US: 544,700 (Note: During 2019, the album sold over 312,000 copies. In addition, it sold 165,700 during 2020 in the United States, 35,000 in 2021 and 32,000 in 2022.); CAN: 46,000 (Note: During 2019, the album sold 37,000 copies in Canada. It sold an additional 7,000 in 2020, and 2,000 in the first sixth months of 2021.)	RIAA: 4× Platinum; ARIA: 2× Platinum; BPI: 2× Platinum; IFPI DEN: 5× Platinum; MC: 8× Platinum; RMNZ: 5× Platinum
Twelve Carat Toothache	Released: June 3, 2022; Label: Republic, Mercury; Format: CD, LP, cassette, digital download, streaming	2	2	1	2	3	2	1	2	3	3	US: 51,000	ARIA: Gold; BPI: Gold; GLF: Gold; IFPI DEN: Platinum; MC: Platinum; RMNZ: Platinum
Austin	Released: July 28, 2023; Label: Republic, Mercury; Format: CD, LP, cassette, digital download, streaming	2	2	4	3	2	2	2	3	3	3	US: 34,000	BPI: Silver; NVPI: Gold; RMNZ: Gold
F-1 Trillion	Released: August 16, 2024; Label: Republic, Mercury; Format: CD, LP, cassette, digital download, streaming	1	2	1	4	5	1	1	1	3	1	US: 80,000	RIAA: Platinum; ARIA: Gold; BPI: Gold; IFPI DEN: Platinum; RMNZ: Platinum
The Eternal Buzz	Releasing: 2027; Label: Republic, Mercury; Format: CD, LP, cassette, digital download, streaming	To be released											
"—" denotes a recording that did not chart or was not released in that territory.

=== Live albums ===
List of live albums, with release details and selected chart positions
Title	Details	Peak chart positions			
Title	Details	US	CRO	GER	NLD
Post Malone Tribute to Nirvana	Released: April 12, 2025; Label: Republic, Mercury; Format: LP	106	21	37	46

=== Extended plays ===
List of extended plays with selected details
Title	Details
Post Malone Live from NPR's Tiny Desk	Released: October 30, 2026; Label: Republic, Mercury; Formats: Digital download, streaming

=== Compilation albums ===
List of compilation albums, with selected details
Title	Details	Peak chart positions							Certifications
Title	Details	US	US R&B /HH	AUS	CAN	IRE	NZ	UK	Certifications
The Diamond Collection	Released: April 21, 2023; Label: Republic, Mercury; Formats: CD, LP, Digital download, streaming	11	2	3	10	6	3	14	BPI: Platinum; RMNZ: 2× Platinum

== Mixtapes ==
List of mixtapes with selected details
Title	Details	Peak chart positions	
Title	Details	US	NLD
Manifest Destiny (as Austin)	Released: 2011; Label: Self-released; Formats: Digital download	—	—
Y.A.T.R.	Released: February 4, 2014; Label: Self-released; Formats: Digital download	—	—
August 26th	Released: May 12, 2016; Label: Republic; Formats: LP, Digital download, streaming	135	32

== Singles ==
=== As lead artist ===
List of singles as a lead artist, showing year of release, with selected chart positions, certifications and originating album
Title	Year	Peak chart positions										Certifications	Album
Title	Year	US	AUS	CAN	DEN	IRE	NLD	NOR	NZ	SWE	UK	Certifications	Album
"White Iverson"	2015	14	—	41	—	91	—	—	—	— (Note: "White Iverson" did not enter the Swedish Singellista Chart, but peaked at number four on the Swedish Heatseekers Chart.)	117	RIAA: Diamond; ARIA: 4× Platinum; BPI: Platinum; IFPI DEN: Platinum; MC: 7× Platinum; RMNZ: 4× Platinum	Stoney
"Too Young"	2015	—	—	—	—	—	—	—	—	—	—	RIAA: 2× Platinum; ARIA: Platinum; BPI: Silver; MC: 2× Platinum; RMNZ: Gold	Stoney
"Go Flex"	2016	76	—	74	—	63	—	—	—	54	100	RIAA: 6× Platinum; ARIA: 5× Platinum; BPI: Platinum; GLF: 2× Platinum; IFPI DEN: Platinum; MC: 7× Platinum; RMNZ: 4× Platinum	Stoney
"Deja Vu" (featuring Justin Bieber)	2016	75	—	43	—	—	—	—	— (Note: "Deja Vu" did not enter the NZ Top 40 Singles Chart, but peaked at number one on the NZ Heatseekers chart.)	— (Note: "Deja Vu" did not enter the Swedish Singellista Chart, but peaked at number 14 on the Swedish Heatseekers Chart.)	63	RIAA: Platinum; ARIA: 2× Platinum; BPI: Silver; IFPI DEN: Gold; MC: 2× Platinum; RMNZ: 2× Platinum	Stoney
"Congratulations" (featuring Quavo)	2017	8	30	14	39	35	80	—	21	34	26	RIAA: 14× Platinum; ARIA: 10× Platinum; BPI: 2× Platinum; GLF: 3× Platinum; IFPI DEN: 2× Platinum; MC: Diamond; RMNZ: 6× Platinum	Stoney
"Rockstar" (featuring 21 Savage)	2017	1	1	1	1	1	2	1	1	1	1	RIAA: Diamond; ARIA: 14× Platinum; BPI: 4× Platinum; GLF: 7× Platinum; IFPI DEN: 4× Platinum; IFPI NOR: 4× Platinum; MC: Diamond; NVPI: 4× Platinum; RMNZ: 9× Platinum	Beerbongs & Bentleys
"I Fall Apart"	2017	16	2	20	36	15	73	28	1	16	19	RIAA: Diamond; ARIA: 13× Platinum; BPI: 3× Platinum; GLF: 2× Platinum; IFPI DEN: Platinum; MC: Diamond; RMNZ: 9× Platinum	Stoney
"Candy Paint"	2017	34	19	27	18	31	82	38	6	39	65	RIAA: 3× Platinum; ARIA: 5× Platinum; BPI: Platinum; GLF: Platinum; IFPI DEN: Platinum; MC: 6× Platinum; NVPI: Gold; RMNZ: 5× Platinum	Beerbongs & Bentleys
"Psycho" (featuring Ty Dolla Sign)	2018	1	1	1	2	2	8	2	2	1	4	RIAA: Diamond; ARIA: 9× Platinum; BPI: 2× Platinum; GLF: Platinum; IFPI DEN: 2× Platinum; IFPI NOR: Platinum; MC: Diamond; NVPI: Platinum; RMNZ: 5× Platinum	Beerbongs & Bentleys
"Ball for Me" (featuring Nicki Minaj)	2018	16	14	7	—	23	61	—	—	47	70	RIAA: 3× Platinum; ARIA: 2× Platinum; BPI: Gold; MC: 4× Platinum; RMNZ: Platinum	Beerbongs & Bentleys
"Better Now"	2018	3	2	3	3	4	5	1	1	1	6	RIAA: Diamond; ARIA: 10× Platinum; BPI: 3× Platinum; GLF: Platinum; IFPI DEN: 2× Platinum; IFPI NOR: Platinum; MC: Diamond; NVPI: 2× Platinum; RMNZ: 6× Platinum	Beerbongs & Bentleys
"Sunflower" (with Swae Lee)	2018	1	1	1	3	3	33	6	1	4	3	RIAA: 2× Diamond; ARIA: 20× Platinum; BPI: 6× Platinum; IFPI DEN: 3× Platinum; MC: Diamond; RMNZ: 12× Platinum	Spider-Man: Into the Spider-Verse and Hollywood's Bleeding
"Wow"	2018	2	2	3	2	2	21	1	1	2	3	RIAA: Diamond; ARIA: 10× Platinum; BPI: 3× Platinum; IFPI DEN: 2× Platinum; MC: Diamond; RMNZ: 6× Platinum	Hollywood's Bleeding
"Goodbyes" (featuring Young Thug)	2019	3	5	5	7	4	5	6	4	4	5	RIAA: 3× Platinum; ARIA: 6× Platinum; BPI: Platinum; IFPI DEN: Platinum; MC: 7× Platinum; RMNZ: 3× Platinum	Hollywood's Bleeding
"Circles"	2019	1	2	2	3	2	4	2	1	7	3	RIAA: Diamond; ARIA: 16× Platinum; BPI: 4× Platinum; IFPI DEN: 3× Platinum; MC: Diamond; RMNZ: 9× Platinum	Hollywood's Bleeding
"Enemies" (featuring DaBaby)	2019	16	28	15	25	—	32	17	37	32	— (Note: "Enemies" did not enter the UK Singles Chart, as chart rules only allow three songs per artist to chart within the top one hundred at a time, but peaked at number 27 on the UK Streaming Chart.)	RIAA: Platinum; ARIA: Platinum; BPI: Silver; MC: 3× Platinum; RMNZ: Platinum	Hollywood's Bleeding
"Allergic"	2019	37	45	39	—	—	56	28	—	55	— (Note: "Allergic" did not enter the UK Singles Chart, as chart rules only allow three songs per artist to chart within the top one hundred at a time, but peaked at number 44 on the UK Streaming Chart.)	RIAA: Platinum; ARIA: Gold; MC: Platinum	Hollywood's Bleeding
"Take What You Want" (featuring Ozzy Osbourne and Travis Scott)	2019	8	30	8	19	37	37	12	30	24	22	RIAA: 2× Platinum; ARIA: 2× Platinum; BPI: Gold; IFPI DEN: Gold; MC: 5× Platinum; RMNZ: Platinum	Hollywood's Bleeding
"Only Wanna Be with You (Pokémon 25 Version)"	2021	74	—	58	—	55	—	34	— (Note: "Only Wanna Be with You" did not enter the NZ Top 40 Singles Chart, but peaked at number seven on the NZ Hot Singles Chart.)	33	76		Pokémon 25: The Album
"Life's a Mess II" (with Juice Wrld and Clever)	2021	97	—	68	—	—	—	—	—	—	—		Crazy
"Motley Crew"	2021	13	19	9	29	24	73	21	28	37	31	ARIA: Platinum; BPI: Silver; MC: 2× Platinum; RMNZ: Gold	Non-album single
"One Right Now" (with the Weeknd)	2021	6	9	7	12	15	35	7	19	10	20	ARIA: 3× Platinum; BPI: Gold; GLF: Platinum; IFPI DEN: Gold; IFPI NOR: Gold; MC: 3× Platinum; RMNZ: Platinum	Twelve Carat Toothache
"Cooped Up" (featuring Roddy Ricch)	2022	12	10	10	21	20	70	20	8	26	18	ARIA: Platinum; BPI: Silver; MC: Platinum; RMNZ: Platinum	Twelve Carat Toothache
"I Like You (A Happier Song)" (featuring Doja Cat)	2022	3	7	5	15	15	44	13	6	23	19	ARIA: 5× Platinum; BPI: Platinum; GLF: Gold; IFPI DEN: Gold; MC: 3× Platinum; RMNZ: 3× Platinum	Twelve Carat Toothache
"Cooped up / Return of the Mack" (with Mark Morrison and Sickick)	2022	—	—	—	—	—	—	—	—	—	—	ARIA: Platinum; RMNZ: Gold	Non-album single
"Chemical"	2023	13	13	8	16	12	12	10	15	11	11	ARIA: 3× Platinum; BPI: Platinum; IFPI DEN: Gold; RMNZ: 2× Platinum	Austin
"Mourning"	2023	36	50	40	—	31	78	—	31	55	35	ARIA: Gold; RMNZ: Gold	Austin
"Overdrive"	2023	47	68	44	—	47	—	—	— (Note: "Overdrive" did not enter the NZ Top 40 Singles Chart, but peaked at number four on the NZ Hot Singles Chart.)	50	45	RMNZ: Gold	Austin
"Dial Drunk" (with Noah Kahan)	2023	25	45	10	—	11	—	—	26	—	—	RIAA: 2× Platinum; ARIA: Gold; BPI: Platinum; MC: 5× Platinum	Stick Season (Forever)
"Enough Is Enough"	2023	56	62	52	—	57	95	20	— (Note: "Enough Is Enough" did not enter the NZ Top 40 Singles Chart, but peaked at number seven on the NZ Hot Singles Chart.)	36	52	ARIA: Gold	Austin
"I Had Some Help" (featuring Morgan Wallen)	2024	1	1	1	4	1	15	1	2	3	2	RIAA: 5× Platinum; ARIA: 9× Platinum; BPI: 2× Platinum; IFPI DEN: Platinum; RMNZ: 5× Platinum	F-1 Trillion
"Pour Me a Drink" (featuring Blake Shelton)	2024	12	33	12	—	44	—	20	37	46	34	RIAA: Platinum; BPI: Silver; RMNZ: Platinum	F-1 Trillion
"Guy for That" (featuring Luke Combs)	2024	17	18	14	—	24	99	15	20	38	25	BPI: Gold; RMNZ: Platinum	F-1 Trillion
"What Don't Belong to Me"	2024	40	—	38	—	—	—	—	— (Note: "What Don't Belong to Me" did not enter the NZ Top 40 Singles Chart, but peaked at number eight on the NZ Hot Singles Chart.)	—	—		F-1 Trillion
"Losers" (featuring Jelly Roll)	2025	25	95	27	—	—	—	—	— (Note: "Losers" did not enter the NZ Top 40 Singles Chart, but peaked at number five on the NZ Hot Singles Chart.)	— (Note: "Losers" did not enter the Swedish Singellista Chart, but peaked at number 12 on the Swedish Heatseeker Chart.)	—		F-1 Trillion
"—" denotes a recording that did not chart or was not released in that territory.

=== As featured artist ===
List of singles as a featured artist, showing year of release, selected chart positions, certifications and originating album
Title	Year	Peak chart positions										Certifications	Album
Title	Year	US	AUS	CAN	DEN	IRE	NLD	NOR	NZ	SWE	UK	Certifications	Album
"Fade" (Kanye West featuring Ty Dolla Sign and Post Malone)	2016	47	69	37	—	75	—	—	—	—	50	RIAA: 2× Platinum; BPI: Gold; RMNZ: Gold	The Life of Pablo
"Burning Man" (Watt featuring Post Malone)	2017	— (Note: "Burning Man" did not enter the Billboard Hot 100, but peaked at number 40 on the Mainstream Top 40's Alternative chart.)	—	—	—	—	—	—	—	—	—		xXx: Return of Xander Cage
"Homemade Dynamite" (Remix) (Lorde featuring Khalid, Post Malone, and SZA)	2017	92	23	54	—	—	92	—	20	84	—	ARIA: 5× Platinum; MC: Platinum; RMNZ: Platinum	Melodrama
"You" (Neptune featuring Post Malone)	2018	—	—	—	—	—	—	—	—	—	—		You (EP)
"Jackie Chan" (Tiësto and Dzeko featuring Preme and Post Malone)	2018	52	13	7	6	21	7	13	7	25	5	RIAA: 2× Platinum; ARIA: Platinum; BPI: 2× Platinum; GLF: 2× Platinum; IFPI DEN: Platinum; MC: 3× Platinum; RMNZ: 3× Platinum	The London Sessions
"Writing on the Wall" (French Montana featuring Post Malone, Cardi B, and Rvssian)	2019	56	43	18	—	—	—	19	—	40	44	RIAA: Gold; MC: Gold	Montana
"It's a Raid" (Ozzy Osbourne featuring Post Malone)	2020	—	—	—	—	—	—	—	— (Note: "It's a Raid" did not enter the NZ Top 40 Singles Chart, but peaked at number 22 on the NZ Hot Singles Chart.)	—	—		Ordinary Man
"Tommy Lee" (Tyla Yaweh featuring Post Malone)	2020	65	93	37	—	—	—	—	— (Note: "Tommy Lee" did not enter the NZ Top 40 Singles Chart, but peaked at number 4 on the NZ Hot Singles Chart.)	92	56	RIAA: Platinum; MC: Platinum; RMNZ: Gold	Non-album single
"Tap In" (Remix) (Saweetie featuring Post Malone, DaBaby, and Jack Harlow)	2020	—	—	—	—	—	—	—	—	—	—		Pretty Bitch Music
"Wolves" (Big Sean featuring Post Malone)	2020	65	—	56	—	—	—	—	—	—	—	RIAA: Platinum; RMNZ: Gold	Detroit 2
"Spicy" (Ty Dolla Sign featuring Post Malone)	2020	53	68	29	—	—	—	40	—	—	71	RMNZ: Platinum	Featuring Ty Dolla Sign
"I Did It" (DJ Khaled featuring Post Malone, Megan Thee Stallion, Lil Baby, and DaBaby)	2021	43	99	22	—	53	—	—	— (Note: "I Did It" did not enter the NZ Top 40 Singles Chart, but peaked at number seven on the NZ Hot Singles Chart.)	50	53	RIAA: Gold	Khaled Khaled
"Pickup Man" (Joe Diffie featuring Post Malone)	2023	— (Note: "Pickup Man" did not enter the Billboard Hot 100, but peaked at number five on the Bubbling Under Hot 100 ranking, which serves as a 25-position extension to the main Hot 100.)	—	80	—	—	—	—	—	—	—		Hixtape: Vol. 3: Difftape
"Fortnight" (Taylor Swift featuring Post Malone)	2024	1	1	1	2	2	8	4	1	4	1	ARIA: 5× Platinum; BPI: 2× Platinum; RMNZ: 2× Platinum; IFPI DEN: Platinum	The Tortured Poets Department
"Brother" (DJ Khaled featuring Post Malone and YoungBoy Never Broke Again)	2025	— (Note: "Brother" did not make the Billboard Hot 100, but peaked at number 30 on the Hot R&B/Hip-Hop Songs chart.)	—	—	—	—	—	—	—	—	—		Aalam of God
"Cold" (BigXthaPlug featuring Post Malone)	2025	82	—	73	—	—	—	—	— (Note: "Cold" did not enter the NZ Top 40 Singles Chart, but peaked at number 16 on the NZ Hot Singles Chart.)	—	—		I Hope You're Happy
"—" denotes a recording that did not chart or was not released in that territory.

=== Promotional singles ===
List of promotional singles, showing year released, selected chart positions, certifications and originating album
Title	Year	Peak chart positions									Certifications	Album
Title	Year	US	US R&B /HH Bub.	AUS	CAN	IRE	NOR	SWE	UK	WW	Certifications	Album
"Patient"	2016	—	8	—	97	—	—	—	—	—	RIAA: Platinum; ARIA: Platinum; MC: Platinum	Stoney
"Leave"	2016	—	—	—	—	—	—	—	—	—	RIAA: Platinum; MC: Platinum	Stoney
"I Ain't Comin' Back" (with Morgan Wallen)	2025	8	—	56	14	49	36	68	50	20		I'm the Problem
"—" denotes a recording that did not chart or was not released in that territory.

== Other charted and certified songs ==
List of other charted and certified songs, showing year released, selected chart positions, certifications and originating album
Title	Year	Peak chart positions										Certifications	Album
Title	Year	US	US R&B /HH	US Rap	AUS	CAN	IRE	NLD	NZ	SWE	UK	Certifications	Album
"Broken Whiskey Glass"	2016	—	—	—	—	—	—	—	—	—	—	MC: Platinum; RMNZ: Gold	Stoney
"Big Lie"	2016	—	— (Note: "Big Lie" did not enter the Hot R&B/Hip-Hop Songs, but peaked at number six on the Hot R&B/Hip-Hop Songs.)	—	—	—	—	—	—	—	—	RIAA: Platinum; ARIA: Platinum; BPI: Silver; MC: Platinum; RMNZ: Gold	Stoney
"No Option"	2016	— (Note: "No Option" did not enter the Billboard Hot 100, but peaked at number 18 on the Bubbling Under Hot 100 ranking, which serves as a 25-position extension to the main Hot 100.)	— (Note: "No Option" did not enter the Hot R&B/Hip-Hop Songs, but peaked at number four on the Hot R&B/Hip-Hop Songs.)	—	—	—	—	—	— (Note: "No Option" did not enter the NZ Top 40 Singles Chart, but peaked at number eight on the NZ Heatseeker Singles Chart.)	—	—	RIAA: Platinum; BPI: Silver; MC: 2× Platinum; RMNZ: Platinum	Stoney
"Cold"	2016	—	—	—	—	—	—	—	—	—	—	MC: Gold	Stoney
"Feel" (featuring Kehlani)	2016	—	—	—	—	—	—	—	—	—	—	RIAA: Platinum; MC: Platinum; RMNZ: Gold	Stoney
"Up There"	2016	—	—	—	—	—	—	—	—	—	—	RIAA: Platinum; MC: Platinum; RMNZ: Gold	Stoney
"Yours Truly, Austin Post"	2016	—	—	—	—	—	—	—	—	—	—	RIAA: Platinum; MC: Platinum	Stoney
"Hit This Hard"	2016	—	—	—	—	—	—	—	—	—	—	MC: Gold	Stoney
"Money Made Me Do It" (featuring 2 Chainz)	2016	—	—	—	—	—	—	—	— (Note: "Money Made Me Do It" did not enter the NZ Top 40 Singles Chart, but peaked at number nine on the NZ Heatseeker Singles Chart.)	—	—	RIAA: Platinum; MC: Platinum; RMNZ: Gold	Stoney
"Feeling Whitney"	2016	—	—	—	—	—	—	—	—	—	—	RIAA: Platinum; ARIA: 2× Platinum; BPI: Gold; MC: 3× Platinum; RMNZ: 2× Platinum	Stoney
"Notice Me" (Migos featuring Post Malone)	2018	52	26	24	—	35	—	—	—	—	—	RIAA: Platinum; MC: Gold; RMNZ: Platinum	Culture II
"Paranoid"	2018	11	7	7	10	6	7	33	7	16	11	RIAA: Platinum; ARIA: Platinum; BPI: Gold; MC: 2× Platinum; RMNZ: Platinum	Beerbongs & Bentleys
"Spoil My Night" (featuring Swae Lee)	2018	15	10	—	19	12	18	43	— (Note: "Spoil My Night" did not enter the NZ Top 40 Singles Chart, but peaked at number one on the NZ Heatseeker Singles Chart.)	32	— (Note: "Spoil My Night" did not enter the UK Singles Chart, as chart rules only allow three songs per artist to chart within the top one hundred at a time, but peaked at number 15 on the UK Streaming Chart.)	RIAA: Platinum; ARIA: Platinum; BPI: Silver; MC: 2× Platinum; RMNZ: Gold	Beerbongs & Bentleys
"Rich & Sad"	2018	14	9	—	21	13	21	54	26	31	— (Note: "Rich & Sad" did not enter the UK Singles Chart, as chart rules only allow three songs per artist to chart within the top one hundred at a time, but peaked at number 16 on the UK Streaming Chart.)	RIAA: Platinum; ARIA: Platinum; BPI: Gold; MC: 2× Platinum; RMNZ: Platinum	Beerbongs & Bentleys
"Over Now"	2018	24	16	13	27	20	19	60	—	34	— (Note: "Over Now" did not enter the UK Singles Chart, as chart rules only allow three songs per artist to chart within the top one hundred at a time, but peaked at number 19 on the UK Streaming Chart.)	RIAA: 2× Platinum; ARIA: Platinum; BPI: Gold; MC: 2× Platinum; RMNZ: Platinum	Beerbongs & Bentleys
"Zack and Codeine"	2018	23	15	12	32	17	22	63	—	54	— (Note: "Zack & Codeine" did not enter the UK Singles Chart, as chart rules only allow three songs per artist to chart within the top one hundred at a time, but peaked at number 16 on the UK Streaming Chart.)	RIAA: Platinum; ARIA: Platinum; BPI: Silver; MC: Platinum; RMNZ: Gold	Beerbongs & Bentleys
"Same Bitches" (featuring G-Eazy and YG)	2018	20	13	10	25	18	26	65	—	57	— (Note: "Same Bitches" did not enter the UK Singles Chart, as chart rules only allow three songs per artist to chart within the top one hundred at a time, but peaked at number 29 on the UK Streaming Chart.)	RIAA: Platinum; ARIA: Platinum; BPI: Silver; MC: 2× Platinum; RMNZ: Gold	Beerbongs & Bentleys
"Stay"	2018	17	—	—	30	15	16	66	20	48	— (Note: "Stay" did not enter the UK Singles Chart, as chart rules only allow three songs per artist to chart within the top one hundred at a time, but peaked at number 21 on the UK Streaming Chart.)	RIAA: Platinum; ARIA: 2× Platinum; BPI: Gold; MC: 3× Platinum; RMNZ: Platinum	Beerbongs & Bentleys
"Takin' Shots"	2018	29	18	15	36	22	25	72	—	52	— (Note: "Takin' Shots" did not enter the UK Singles Chart, as chart rules only allow three songs per artist to chart within the top one hundred at a time, but peaked at number 25 on the UK Streaming Chart.)	RIAA: Platinum; ARIA: Gold; BPI: Silver; MC: Platinum; RMNZ: Gold	Beerbongs & Bentleys
"Otherside"	2018	46	29	—	41	30	28	79	—	60	— (Note: "Otherside" did not enter the UK Singles Chart, as chart rules only allow three songs per artist to chart within the top one hundred at a time, but peaked at number 34 on the UK Streaming Chart.)	RIAA: Platinum; ARIA: Gold; BPI: Silver; MC: Platinum; RMNZ: Gold	Beerbongs & Bentleys
"92 Explorer"	2018	40	26	19	44	26	29	86	—	63	— (Note: "92 Explorer" did not enter the UK Singles Chart, as chart rules only allow three songs per artist to chart within the top one hundred at a time, but peaked at number 35 on the UK Streaming Chart.)	RIAA: 2× Platinum; ARIA: Platinum; BPI: Silver; MC: 2× Platinum; RMNZ: Platinum	Beerbongs & Bentleys
"Blame It on Me"	2018	47	30	—	43	32	33	94	—	72	— (Note: "Blame It on Me" did not enter the UK Singles Chart, as chart rules only allow three songs per artist to chart within the top one hundred at a time, but peaked at number 39 on the UK Streaming Chart.)	RIAA: Platinum; ARIA: Gold; BPI: Silver; MC: Platinum; RMNZ: Gold	Beerbongs & Bentleys
"Sugar Wraith"	2018	57	37	—	58	44	42	—	—	77	— (Note: "Sugar Wraith" did not enter the UK Singles Chart, as chart rules only allow three songs per artist to chart within the top one hundred at a time, but peaked at number 44 on the UK Streaming Chart.)	RIAA: Platinum; ARIA: Gold; BPI: Silver; MC: Platinum; RMNZ: Gold	Beerbongs & Bentleys
"Jonestown (Interlude)"	2018	73	45	—	—	57	51	—	—	— (Note: "Jonestown (Interlude)" did not enter the Swedish Singellista Chart, but peaked at number four on the Swedish Heatseeker Chart.)	— (Note: "Jonestown (Interlude)" did not enter the UK Singles Chart, as chart rules only allow three songs per artist to chart within the top one hundred at a time, but peaked at number 58 on the UK Streaming Chart.)	MC: Gold	Beerbongs & Bentleys
"All My Friends" (21 Savage featuring Post Malone)	2018	67	23	21	—	73	—	—	— (Note: "All My Friends" did not enter the NZ Top 40 Singles Chart, but peaked at number six on the NZ Hot Singles Chart.)	—	—		I Am > I Was
"Celebrate" (DJ Khaled featuring Travis Scott and Post Malone)	2019	52	23	19	—	37	—	—	—	—	—	RIAA: Gold	Father of Asahd
"Hollywood's Bleeding"	2019	15	—	—	17	12	8	20	18	12	11	RIAA: Platinum; ARIA: 2× Platinum; BPI: Silver; MC: 2× Platinum; RMNZ: Platinum	Hollywood's Bleeding
"Saint-Tropez"	2019	18	10	8	19	10	12	23	17	10	52	RIAA: Platinum; ARIA: Platinum; BPI: Silver; MC: 2× Platinum; RMNZ: Platinum	Hollywood's Bleeding
"A Thousand Bad Times"	2019	29	—	—	39	29	—	44	—	43	— (Note: "A Thousand Bad Times" did not enter the UK Singles Chart, as chart rules only allow three songs per artist to chart within the top one hundred at a time, but peaked at number 34 on the UK Streaming Chart.)	RIAA: Platinum; ARIA: Gold; BPI: Silver; MC: Platinum; RMNZ: Gold	Hollywood's Bleeding
"Die for Me" (featuring Future and Halsey)	2019	20	11	9	23	21	—	38	—	39	— (Note: "Die for Me" did not enter the UK Singles Chart, as chart rules only allow three songs per artist to chart within the top one hundred at a time, but peaked at number 30 on the UK Streaming Chart.)	RIAA: Platinum; ARIA: Platinum; BPI: Silver; MC: 2× Platinum; RMNZ: Gold	Hollywood's Bleeding
"On the Road" (featuring Meek Mill and Lil Baby)	2019	22	13	11	35	22	—	41	—	47	— (Note: "On the Road" did not enter the UK Singles Chart, as chart rules only allow three songs per artist to chart within the top one hundred at a time, but peaked at number 37 on the UK Streaming Chart.)	RIAA: Platinum; ARIA: Platinum; BPI: Silver; MC: 2× Platinum; RMNZ: Gold	Hollywood's Bleeding
"I'm Gonna Be"	2019	33	—	—	54	35	—	65	—	69	— (Note: "I'm Gonna Be" did not enter the UK Singles Chart, as chart rules only allow three songs per artist to chart within the top one hundred at a time, but peaked at number 49 on the UK Streaming Chart.)	RIAA: Platinum; ARIA: Gold; MC: Platinum	Hollywood's Bleeding
"Staring at the Sun" (featuring SZA)	2019	34	—	—	48	38	—	70	—	71	— (Note: "Staring at the Sun" did not enter the UK Singles Chart, as chart rules only allow three songs per artist to chart within the top one hundred at a time, but peaked at number 48 on the UK Streaming Chart.)	RIAA: Platinum; ARIA: Gold; MC: Platinum; RMNZ: Gold	Hollywood's Bleeding
"Internet"	2019	58	25	22	77	53	—	91	—	— (Note: "Internet" did not enter the Swedish Singellista Chart, but peaked at number one on the Swedish Heatseeker Chart.)	— (Note: "Internet" did not enter the UK Singles Chart, as chart rules only allow three songs per artist to chart within the top one hundred at a time, but peaked at number 67 on the UK Streaming Chart.)	MC: Gold	Hollywood's Bleeding
"Myself"	2019	52	—	—	71	47	—	85	—	89	— (Note: "Myself" did not enter the UK Singles Chart, as chart rules only allow three songs per artist to chart within the top one hundred at a time, but peaked at number 66 on the UK Streaming Chart.)	ARIA: Gold; MC: Platinum	Hollywood's Bleeding
"I Know"	2019	53	24	21	76	52	—	90	—	96	— (Note: "I Know" did not enter the UK Singles Chart, as chart rules only allow three songs per artist to chart within the top one hundred at a time, but peaked at number 69 on the UK Streaming Chart.)	ARIA: Gold; MC: Gold	Hollywood's Bleeding
"Forever" (Justin Bieber featuring Post Malone and Clever)	2020	24	13	—	29	20	23	31	32	10	29	RIAA: Gold; ARIA: Gold; RMNZ: Gold	Changes
"Livin It Up" (with Young Thug and ASAP Rocky)	2021	68	—	—	—	62	—	—	— (Note: "Livin It Up" did not enter the NZ Top 40 Singles Chart, but peaked at number eight on the NZ Hot Singles Chart.)	—	—	RMNZ: Gold	Punk
"Reputation"	2022	54	—	—	—	43	—	—	— (Note: "Reputation" did not enter the NZ Top 40 Singles Chart, but peaked at number four on the NZ Hot Singles Chart.)	— (Note: "Reputation" did not enter the Swedish Singellista Chart, but peaked at number 11 on the Swedish Heatseeker Chart.)	— (Note: "Reputation" did not enter the UK Singles Chart, as chart rules only allow three songs per artist to chart within the top one hundred at a time, but peaked at number 91 on the UK Streaming Chart.)		Twelve Carat Toothache
"Lemon Tree"	2022	53	—	—	—	35	41	—	—	— (Note: "Lemon Tree" did not enter the Swedish Singellista Chart, but peaked at number 12 on the Swedish Heatseeker Chart.)	40		Twelve Carat Toothache
"Wrapped Around Your Finger"	2022	47	—	—	—	38	—	—	— (Note: "Wrapped Around Your Finger" did not enter the NZ Top 40 Singles Chart, but peaked at number five on the NZ Hot Singles Chart.)	— (Note: "Wrapped Around Your Finger" did not enter the Swedish Singellista Chart, but peaked at number 15 on the Swedish Heatseeker Chart.)	— (Note: "Wrapped Around Your Finger" did not enter the UK Singles Chart, as chart rules only allow three songs per artist to chart within the top one hundred at a time, but peaked at number 100 on the UK Streaming Chart.)		Twelve Carat Toothache
"I Cannot Be (A Sadder Song)" (featuring Gunna)	2022	46	8	8	—	34	—	—	—	—	—		Twelve Carat Toothache
"Insane"	2022	62	14	14	—	52	—	—	—	—	—		Twelve Carat Toothache
"Love/Hate Letter to Alcohol" (featuring Fleet Foxes)	2022	70	—	—	—	55	—	—	—	—	—		Twelve Carat Toothache
"Wasting Angels" (featuring the Kid Laroi)	2022	56	—	—	30	30	—	—	— (Note: "Wasting Angels" did not enter the NZ Top 40 Singles Chart, but peaked at number three on the NZ Hot Singles Chart.)	89	—		Twelve Carat Toothache
"Euthanasia"	2022	100	—	—	—	87	—	—	—	—	—		Twelve Carat Toothache
"When I'm Alone"	2022	97	—	—	—	86	—	—	—	—	—		Twelve Carat Toothache
"Waiting for a Miracle"	2022	— (Note: "Waiting for a Miracle" did not enter the Billboard Hot 100, but peaked at number 12 on the Bubbling Under Hot 100 ranking, which serves as a 25-position extension to the main Hot 100.)	—	—	—	—	—	—	—	—	—		Twelve Carat Toothache
"New Recording 12, Jan 3, 2020"	2022	— (Note: "New Recording 12, Jan 3, 2020" did not enter the Billboard Hot 100, but peaked at number 24 on the Bubbling Under Hot 100 ranking, which serves as a 25-position extension to the main Hot 100.)	—	—	—	—	—	—	—	—	—		Twelve Carat Toothache
"Sober" (YG featuring Roddy Ricch and Post Malone)	2022	—	—	—	—	—	—	—	— (Note: "Sober" did not enter the NZ Top 40 Singles Chart, but peaked at number 19 on the NZ Hot Singles Chart.)	—	—		I Got Issues
"What You Say" (YoungBoy Never Broke Again featuring Post Malone and the Kid Laroi)	2023	—	47	—	—	—	—	—	—	—	—		Don't Try This at Home
"Don't Understand"	2023	88	—	—	—	78	—	—	— (Note: "Don't Understand" did not enter the NZ Top 40 Singles Chart, but peaked at number 11 on the NZ Hot Singles Chart.)	—	—		Austin
"Something Real"	2023	67	—	—	—	62	65	—	— (Note: "Something Real" did not enter the NZ Top 40 Singles Chart, but peaked at number eight on the NZ Hot Singles Chart.)	— (Note: "Something Real" did not enter the Swedish Singellista Chart, but peaked at number six on the Swedish Heatseeker Chart.)	—		Austin
"Novacandy"	2023	90	—	—	—	81	—	—	—	—	—		Austin
"Too Cool to Die"	2023	87	—	—	—	74	—	—	—	—	—		Austin
"Sign Me Up"	2023	— (Note: "Sign Me Up" did not enter the Billboard Hot 100, but peaked at number one on the Bubbling Under Hot 100 ranking, which serves as a 25-position extension to the main Hot 100.)	—	—	—	90	—	—	—	—	—		Austin
"Socialite"	2023	— (Note: "Socialite" did not enter the Billboard Hot 100, but peaked at number two on the Bubbling Under Hot 100 ranking, which serves as a 25-position extension to the main Hot 100.)	—	—	—	93	—	—	—	—	—		Austin
"Speedometer"	2023	— (Note: "Speedometer" did not enter the Billboard Hot 100, but peaked at number 10 on the Bubbling Under Hot 100 ranking, which serves as a 25-position extension to the main Hot 100.)	—	—	—	—	—	—	—	—	—		Austin
"Hold My Breath"	2023	— (Note: "Hold My Breath" did not enter the Billboard Hot 100, but peaked at number 17 on the Bubbling Under Hot 100 ranking, which serves as a 25-position extension to the main Hot 100.)	—	—	—	—	—	—	—	—	—		Austin
"Texas Tea"	2023	— (Note: "Texas Tea" did not enter the Billboard Hot 100, but peaked at number 17 on the Bubbling Under Hot 100 ranking, which serves as a 25-position extension to the main Hot 100.)	—	—	—	—	—	—	—	—	—		Austin
"Buyer Beware"	2023	— (Note: "Buyer Beware" did not enter the Billboard Hot 100, but peaked at number 21 on the Bubbling Under Hot 100 ranking, which serves as a 25-position extension to the main Hot 100.)	—	—	—	—	—	—	—	—	—		Austin
"Landmine"	2023	— (Note: "Landmine" did not enter the Billboard Hot 100, but peaked at number 24 on the Bubbling Under Hot 100 ranking, which serves as a 25-position extension to the main Hot 100.)	—	—	—	—	—	—	—	—	—		Austin
"Laugh It Off"	2023	— (Note: "Laugh It Off" did not enter the Billboard Hot 100, but peaked at number 25 on the Bubbling Under Hot 100 ranking, which serves as a 25-position extension to the main Hot 100.)	—	—	—	—	—	—	—	—	—		Austin
"Levii's Jeans" (with Beyoncé)	2024	16	—	—	73	41	—	—	—	—	—		Cowboy Carter
"Wrong Ones" (featuring Tim McGraw)	2024	23	—	—	—	24	—	—	— (Note: "Wrong Ones" did not enter the NZ Top 40 Singles Chart, but peaked at number two on the NZ Hot Singles Chart.)	— (Note: "Wrong Ones" did not enter the Swedish Singellista Chart, but peaked at number 11 on the Swedish Heatseeker Chart.)	—		F-1 Trillion
"Finer Things" (featuring Hank Williams Jr.)	2024	42	—	—	—	39	—	—	—	—	—		F-1 Trillion
"Have the Heart" (featuring Dolly Parton)	2024	56	—	—	—	44	—	—	—	—	—		F-1 Trillion
"Goes Without Saying" (featuring Brad Paisley)	2024	56	—	—	—	47	—	—	—	—	—		F-1 Trillion
"Nosedive" (featuring Lainey Wilson)	2024	50	—	—	—	43	—	—	—	—	—		F-1 Trillion
"Devil I've Been" (featuring Ernest)	2024	66	—	—	—	57	—	—	—	—	—		F-1 Trillion
"Never Love You Again" (featuring Sierra Ferrell)	2024	78	—	—	—	62	—	—	—	—	—		F-1 Trillion
"Missin' You Like This" (featuring Luke Combs)	2024	63	—	—	—	53	—	—	—	—	—		F-1 Trillion
"California Sober" (featuring Chris Stapleton)	2024	34	—	—	—	30	—	—	— (Note: "California Sober" did not enter the NZ Top 40 Singles Chart, but peaked at number four on the NZ Hot Singles Chart.)	93	—		F-1 Trillion
"Hide My Gun" (featuring Hardy)	2024	65	—	—	—	51	—	—	—	—	—		F-1 Trillion
"Right About You"	2024	88	—	—	—	70	—	—	—	—	—		F-1 Trillion
"M-E-X-I-C-O" (featuring Billy Strings)	2024	83	—	—	—	71	—	—	—	—	—		F-1 Trillion
"Yours"	2024	54	—	—	—	35	—	—	—	—	—		F-1 Trillion
"Take My Heart" (with Swae Lee)	2026	—	—	—	—	—	—	—	— (Note: "Take My Heart" did not enter the NZ Top 40 Singles Chart, but peaked at number 13 on the NZ Hot Singles Chart.)	—	—		Same Difference
"—" denotes a recording that did not chart or was not released in that territory.

== Guest appearances ==
List of non-single guest appearances, showing year released, other performing artist(s), and originating album
Title	Year	Other artist(s)	Album
"On God"	2015	Zuse	Trap Zuse
"Getcha Some"	2015	Chevy Woods, PJ	The 48 Hunnid Project
"Came Up"	2015	Key!	none
"Tryna Fuck Me Over"	2015	50 Cent	The Kanan Tape
"Embarrassed"	2015	Gucci Mane, Riff Raff, Lil B	East Atlanta Santa 2: The Night Guwop Stole Xmas
"The Meaning"	2016	FKi 1st	First Time for Everything (Part 1)
"OMG"	2016	Coke Boy Zack, Quavo, Velous	Here's Half
"BonBon" (Remix)	2016	Era Istrefi	none
"Camera"	2016	DJ Drama, FKi 1st, Lil Uzi Vert, Mac Miller	Quality Street Music 2
"Winner Time"	2016	Sauce Lord Rich	Know Me: King Wolf
"Write Our Names"	2016	Moxie Raia	931
"Malibu"	2016	24hrs	Sunset Blvd
"Too Late"	2017	Trae tha Truth	Tha Truth: Part Three
"Burning Man"	2017	Andrew Watt	none
"What About Me"	2018	Lil Wayne	Tha Carter V (Deluxe)
"All My Friends"	2018	21 Savage	I Am > I Was
"If I Can Dream" (From the NBC Elvis All-Star Tribute)	2019	Elvis Presley, Shawn Mendes, Darius Rucker, Blake Shelton, Carrie Underwood	The Best of the '68 Comeback Special
"Celebrate"	2019	DJ Khaled, Travis Scott	Father of Asahd
"Forever"	2020	Justin Bieber, Clever	Changes
"V12"	2020	Rich the Kid	Boss Man
"Livin It Up"	2021	Young Thug, ASAP Rocky	Punk
"Sober"	2022	YG, Roddy Ricch	I Got Issues
"What You Say"	2023	YoungBoy Never Broke Again, The Kid Laroi	Don't Try This at Home
"Levii's Jeans"	2024	Beyoncé	Cowboy Carter
"Take My Heart"	2026	Swae Lee	Same Difference

== Production discography ==
List of production (songwriting and arrangement) and non-performing songwriting credits (excluding guest appearances, interpolations, and samples)
Track(s)	Year	Credit	Artist(s)	Album
6. "I Understand"; (featuring ILoveMakonnen)	2014	Producer (with FKi 1st)	Key!, FKi	FKEYi
5. "White Iverson"	2016	Co-producer (with Rex Kudo)	Post Malone	Stoney
11. "Me or Us"	2017	Producer (with Rex Kudo and Charlie Handsome)	Young Thug	Beautiful Thugger Girls
7. "Over Now"	2018	Producer (with Louis Bell and Andrew Watt)	Post Malone	Beerbongs & Bentleys
8. "Psycho"; (featuring Ty Dolla Sign)	2018	Producer (with Louis Bell)	Post Malone	Beerbongs & Bentleys
11. "Otherside"	2018	Producer (with Louis Bell)	Post Malone	Beerbongs & Bentleys
12. "Stay"	2018	Producer (with Andrew Watt)	Post Malone	Beerbongs & Bentleys
13. "Blame It on Me"	2018	Producer (with Louis Bell)	Post Malone	Beerbongs & Bentleys
15. "Jonestown (Interlude)"	2018	Producer (with Louis Bell and Twice as Nice)	Post Malone	Beerbongs & Bentleys
17. "Candy Paint"	2018	Producer (with Louis Bell)	Post Malone	Beerbongs & Bentleys
18. "Sugar Wraith"	2018	Producer (with Louis Bell)	Post Malone	Beerbongs & Bentleys
8. "Jackie Chan"; (featuring Post Malone)	2018	Producer (with Louis Bell and Pro Logic)	Preme	Light of Day
6. "Circles"	2019	Producer (with Louis Bell and Frank Dukes)	Post Malone	Hollywood's Bleeding
7. "V12"; (featuring Post Malone)	2020	Producer (with Rex Kudo)	Rich the Kid	Boss Man
2. "Cooped Up"; (featuring Roddy Ricch)	2022	Producer (with Louis Bell)	Post Malone	Twelve Carat Toothache
3. "Lemon Tree"	2022	Producer (with Louis Bell and Charlie Handsome)	Post Malone	Twelve Carat Toothache
4. "Wrapped Around Your Finger"	2022	Producer (with Louis Bell, Andrew Watt, and Omer Fedi)	Post Malone	Twelve Carat Toothache
7. "Insane"	2022	Producer (with Louis Bell)	Post Malone	Twelve Carat Toothache
8. "Love/Hate Letter to Alcohol"; (featuring Fleet Foxes)	2022	Producer (with Louis Bell)	Post Malone	Twelve Carat Toothache
10. "Euthanasia"	2022	Producer (with Louis Bell)	Post Malone	Twelve Carat Toothache
11. "When I'm Alone"	2022	Producer (with Louis Bell)	Post Malone	Twelve Carat Toothache
12. "Waiting for a Miracle"	2022	Producer (with Louis Bell)	Post Malone	Twelve Carat Toothache
14. "New Recording 12, Jan 3, 2020"	2022	Producer (with Louis Bell)	Post Malone	Twelve Carat Toothache
16. "Hateful"	2022	Producer (with Louis Bell and Bryvn)	Post Malone	Twelve Carat Toothache: Deluxe
All tracks	2023	Producer (with Louis Bell and Andrew Watt; tracks 7 and 12 also with Max Martin and Rami Yacoub)	Post Malone	Austin

== Music videos ==
=== As lead artist ===
List of music videos, showing year released and director(s). List does not include street videos.
Title	Year	Director(s)
"White Iverson"	2015	Van Alpert
"Too Young"	2015	John Rawlins
"Boy Bandz"	2015	John Rawlins
"Go Flex"	2016	James DeFina; Chris Velona
"Congratulations" (featuring Quavo)	2017	James DeFina
"Rockstar" (featuring 21 Savage)	2017	Emil Nava
"Psycho" (featuring Ty Dolla Sign)	2018	James DeFina
"Better Now"	2018	Adam Degross
"Sunflower" (Animated video) (with Swae Lee)	2018	Olivier Mouroux; Erik Counter
"Wow" (Animated video)	2018	Jaime Restrepo
"Sunflower" (with Swae Lee)	2019	Unknown
"Wow"	2019	James DeFina
"Wow (Remix)" (featuring Roddy Ricch and Tyga)	2019	Chris Villa; James DeFina
"Goodbyes" (Rated R version) (featuring Young Thug)	2019	Colin Tilley
"Goodbyes" (Rated PG version) (featuring Young Thug)	2019	Colin Tilley
"Circles"	2019	Colin Tilley
"Saint-Tropez"	2019	Chris Villa
"Circles" (Animated video)	2019	Jaime Restrepo
"Circles" (Blue vertical video)	2020	Unknown
"Circles" (Red vertical video)	2020	Unknown
"Only Wanna Be With You (Pokémon 25 Version)"	2021	Unknown
"Motley Crew"	2021	Cole Bennett
"One Right Now"(with the Weeknd)	2021	Tanu Muino
"Cooped Up" (featuring Roddy Ricch)	2022	Andre Bato
"Insane"	2022	Unknown
"I Like You (A Happier Song)" (featuring Doja Cat)	2022	Child
"Chemical"	2023	Alfred Marroquin
"Mourning"	2023	Unknown
"I Had Some Help" (featuring Morgan Wallen)	2024	Chris Villa
"Pour Me a Drink" (featuring Blake Shelton)	2024	Chris Villa
"Guy for That" (featuring Luke Combs)	2024	Chris Villa

=== As featured artist ===
List of music videos as featured artist, showing year released and director(s).
Title	Year	Director(s)
"The Meaning" (FKi 1st featuring Post Malone)	2016	John Rawl; JMP
"Fade" (Kanye West featuring Ty Dolla Sign and Post Malone)	2016	Eli Russell Linnetz
"Burning Man" (Watt featuring Post Malone)	2017	Phillip R. López
"You" (Neptune featuring Post Malone)	2018	unknown
"Jackie Chan" (Tiësto and Dzeko featuring Preme and Post Malone)	2018	Jay Martin
"If I Can Dream" (Elvis Presley featuring Post Malone, Shawn Mendes, Darius Rucker, Blake Shelton and Carrie Underwood)	2019	unknown
"Celebrate" (DJ Khaled featuring Travis Scott and Post Malone)	2019	Joseph Kahn
"Writing on the Wall" (French Montana featuring Post Malone, Cardi B and Rvssian)	2019	Myles Whittingham; French Montana
"Forever" (Justin Bieber featuring Post Malone and Clever)	2020	Nick DeMoura
"Tommy Lee" (Tyla Yaweh featuring Post Malone)	2020	Chris Villa
"Tommy Lee" (Bonus footage version) (Tyla Yaweh featuring Post Malone)	2020	Chris Villa
"Tommy Lee (Tommy Lee Remix)" (Tyla Yaweh and Tommy Lee featuring Post Malone)	2020	Chris Villa
"Tommy Lee (Saint Jhn Remix)" (Tyla Yaweh featuring Saint Jhn and Post Malone)	2020	unknown
"Wolves" (Big Sean featuring Post Malone)	2020	Kid
"Spicy" (Ty Dolla Sign featuring Post Malone)	2020	James Larese
"Tap In (Remix)" (Saweetie featuring Post Malone, DaBaby, and Jack Harlow)	2020	KDC Visions; Aylo
"It's a Raid" (Ozzy Osbourne featuring Post Malone)	2021	Patrik Pope
"Fortnight" (Taylor Swift featuring Post Malone)	2024	Taylor Swift
