= Post Malone Live from NPR's Tiny Desk =

EP by Post Malone
- Released: October 30, 2026
- Genre: Acoustic music
- Length: 13:43
- Labels: Mercury; Republic

Post Malone chronology
Post Malone Tribute to Nirvana (2025)	Post Malone Live from NPR's Tiny Desk (2026)	The Eternal Buzz (2027)

Post Malone Live from NPR's Tiny Desk (stylized as POST MALONE Live from NPR's Tiny Desk) is the first extended play by American musician Post Malone. The EP was released on October 30, 2026, through Mercury Records and Republic Records. It features live recordings from Post Malone's Tiny Desk Concert, originally published by NPR Music on August 15, 2023.

== Background ==
Post Malone made his debut on NPR's Tiny Desk Concert series on August 15, 2023, following the release of his fifth studio album, ''Austin''. Accompanied by a full band, an orchestra, and four backing vocalists, he performed 4 songs. The performance reflected his more recent musical direction towards pop and alternative rock. At the time, Malone was also touring in support of the album.

== Reception ==
Billboard described the performance as a showcase of Malone's vocal versatility, noting that his rendition of "I Fall Apart" was transformed into an emotional, folksy ballad with the accompaniment of a string quartet and backing vocalists. The publication also highlighted the acoustic, roots-oriented arrangements of "Circles" and "Enough Is Enough", with Malone playing acoustic guitar throughout the four-song set. Billboard stated that Malone's voice sounded hoarse from the long hours of touring he has been doing. Malone admitted to being nervous after performing in front of the crowd.

Hypebeast described the concert as an intimate, stripped-back performance spanning Malone's career. It highlighted his vulnerable vocals and acoustic guitar, as well as the stripped-down arrangements of four songs, from earlier hits such as "I Fall Apart", "Sunflower" and "Circles" to "Enough Is Enough" from his latest album at the time, Austin.

== Track listing ==
Credits adapted from Apple Music.

Post Malone Live from NPR's Tiny Desk track listing
No.	Title	Writer(s)	Length
1.	"Sunflower (Live from NPR’s Tiny Desk)"	Austin Post; Khalif Brown; Louis Bell; Carter Lang; William Walsh; Carl Rosen	3:17
2.	"I Fall Apart (Live from NPR’s Tiny Desk)"	Post; Walsh; Carlo "Illangelo" Montagnese	3:23
3.	"Circles (Live from NPR’s Tiny Desk)"	Post; Bell; Walsh; Kaan Güneşberk; Adam King Feeney	3:53
4.	"Enough Is Enough (Live from NPR’s Tiny Desk)"	Post; Bell; Walsh; Max Martin; Rami Yacoub	3:25
Total length:			13:43

== Personnel ==
Musicians

- Austin Post – lead vocalist, guitar
- Hannah Juliano – vocalist
- Elliot Aguilar – vocalist
- Chauncey Matthews – vocalist
- Kola Rail – vocalist
- Destin Johnson – drums
- Emily Rosenfield – guitar
- Bobby Wooten – bass
- Louis Bell – piano
- Kevin Kuh – strings
- Francesca Dardani – strings
- Kiku Enomoto – strings
- Kirin McElwain – strings

Technical

- Bobby Carter – producer
- Suraya Mohamed – producer
- Kara Frame – director, editor, videographer
- Josh Rogosin – audio engineer
- Bob Boilen – creative director
- Maia Stern – videographer
- Joshua Bryant – videographer
- Zayrha Rodriguez – videographer
- Sofia Seidel – videographer
- Hannah Gluvna – audio assistant
- Ashley Pointer – production assistant
- Catie Dull – photographer
- Hazel Cills – Tiny Desk team
- Keith Jenkins – VP, Visuals and Music
- Anya Grundmann – Senior VP, Programming
