= The Diamond Collection =

2023 compilation album by Post Malone

Compilation album by Post Malone
- Released: April 21, 2023
- Length: 32:07
- Label: Mercury; Republic
- Producer: Post Malone; Andrew Watt; Carter Lang; Frank Dukes; Illangelo; Louis Bell; Metro Boomin; Rex Kudo; Tank God

Post Malone chronology
| Twelve Carat Toothache (2022) | The Diamond Collection (2023) | Austin (2023) |

Professional ratings
Review scores
| Source | Rating |
|---|---|
| AllMusic | 3/5 stars |

The Diamond Collection is the first compilation album by American musician Post Malone. It was released through Mercury and Republic Records on April 21, 2023. The album features guest appearances from Quavo, 21 Savage, Ty Dolla Sign, and Swae Lee as well as production from Malone himself, Rex Kudo, Metro Boomin, Frank Dukes, Louis Bell, Illangelo, Tank God, Carter Lang, and Andrew Watt. The album was released to celebrate Malone becoming the artist with the most diamond-certified singles by the Recording Industry Association of America (RIAA). It contains all the singles that were certified diamond from his first three studio albums, Stoney (2016), Beerbongs & Bentleys (2018), and Hollywood's Bleeding (2019), as well as the lead single "Chemical" from his fifth studio album Austin (2023).

On July 21, 2023, the compilation was re-released as a deluxe edition with nine additional songs that were not diamond certified at the time of release but still popular, which also included songs from his previous studio album Twelve Carat Toothache (2022). This contains additional appearances from Young Thug, Ozzy Osbourne, Travis Scott, Doja Cat, and the Weeknd. The deluxe edition of the compilation was announced on October 3, 2023, to be getting its first vinyl release for Record Store Day Black Friday 2023. At some point in 2024, the album was silently altered to reflect "Wow." reaching diamond status also. "Chemical" was moved to the deluxe section, and two more songs from Austin, "Mourning" and "Overdrive", were added as well.

== Track listing ==
The Diamond Collection track listing
| No. | Title | Writer(s) | Producer(s) | Length |
|---|---|---|---|---|
| 1. | "White Iverson" (from Stoney, 2016) | Austin Post; Trocon Roberts, Jr.; Masamune Kudo; Idan Kalai; Andre Jackson | Post Malone; Rex Kudo | 4:16 |
| 2. | "Congratulations" (featuring Quavo; from Stoney, 2016) | Post; Quavious Marshall; Leland Wayne; Adam Feeney; Carl Rosen | Metro Boomin; Frank Dukes; Bell^{[a]} | 3:40 |
| 3. | "I Fall Apart" (from Stoney, 2016) | Post; Carlo Montagnese; William Walsh | Illangelo | 3:43 |
| 4. | "Rockstar" (featuring 21 Savage; from Beerbongs & Bentleys, 2018) | Post; Shayaa Abraham-Joseph; Olufunmibi Awoshiley; Bell; Jo-Vaughn Virginie^{[b]}; Rosen^{[b]} | Bell; Tank God | 3:38 |
| 5. | "Psycho" (featuring Ty Dolla Sign; from Beerbongs & Bentleys, 2018) | Post; Tyrone Griffin, Jr.; Bell; Rosen^{[b]} | Bell; Malone | 3:41 |
| 6. | "Better Now" (from Beerbongs & Bentleys, 2018) | Post; Bell; Feeney; Walsh; Kaan Gunesberk | Bell; Dukes | 3:50 |
| 7. | "Sunflower" (with Swae Lee; from Spider-Man: Into the Spider-Verse, 2018 and Hollywood's Bleeding, 2019) | Post; Khalif Brown; Bell; Carter Lang; Walsh | Bell; Lang | 2:38 |
| 8. | "Circles" (from Hollywood's Bleeding, 2019) | Post; Bell; Feeney; Walsh; Gunesberk | Bell; Malone; Dukes | 3:34 |
| 9. | "Wow." (from Hollywood's Bleeding, 2019) | Post; Bell; Feeney; Walsh; Anthoine Walters | Bell; Frank Dukes | 2:29 |
| Total length: | | | | 31:30 |

The Diamond Collection deluxe tracks
| No. | Title | Writer(s) | Producer(s) | Length |
|---|---|---|---|---|
| 10. | "Go Flex" (from Stoney, 2016) | Post; Idan Kalai; Masamune Kudo; Ryan Vojtesak | Rex Kudo; Charlie Handsome | 2:59 |
| 11. | "Candy Paint" (from Beerbongs & Bentleys, 2018) | Post; Bell; Rosen | Bell; Malone | 3:47 |
| 12. | "Stay" (from Beerbongs & Bentleys, 2018) | Post; Wotman; Bell | Malone; Watt | 3:24 |
| 13. | "Goodbyes" (featuring Young Thug; from Hollywood's Bleeding, 2019) | Post; Jeffery Williams; Brian Lee; Bell; Walsh; Val Blavatnik; Jessie Joutz | Bell; Lee | 2:54 |
| 14. | "Take What You Want" (featuring Ozzy Osbourne and Travis Scott; from Hollywood's Bleeding, 2019) | Post; John Osbourne; Jacques Webster II; Bell; Watt; Walsh | Bell; Watt | 3:49 |
| 15. | "I Like You (A Happier Song)" (featuring Doja Cat; from Twelve Carat Toothache, 2022) | Post; Amala Dlamini; Bell; Jasper Harris; Walsh | Bell; Harris | 3:12 |
| 16. | "One Right Now" (with The Weeknd, from Twelve Carat Toothache, 2022) | Post; Abel Tesfaye; Bell; Lee; Andrew Bolooki; Walsh | Bell; Lee; Bolooki | 3:12 |
| 17. | "Chemical" (from Austin, 2023) | Post; Andrew Wotman; Bell; Walsh | Malone; Andrew Watt; Bell | 3:04 |
| 18. | "Mourning" (from Austin, 2023) | Post; Andrew Wotman; Bell | Post; Andrew Wotman; Bell | 2:27 |
| 19. | "Overdrive" (from Austin, 2023) | Post; Andrew Wotman; Bell; Walsh | Post; Andrew Wotman; Bell | 2:27 |
| 20. | "Feeling Whitney" (from Stoney, 2016) | Post; Wotman | Watt; Bell | 4:17 |
| Total length: | | | | 67:00 |

Notes

- ^{^[a]} signifies an additional producer
- ^{^[b]} signifies an uncredited writer

== Charts ==
=== Weekly charts ===
Weekly chart performance for The Diamond Collection
| Chart (2023–2024) | Peak position |
|---|---|
| Australian Albums (ARIA) | 3 |
| Canadian Albums (Billboard) | 10 |
| French Albums (SNEP) | 131 |
| Irish Albums (Official Charts) | 6 |
| New Zealand Albums (RMNZ) | 3 |
| UK Albums (Official Charts) | 14 |
| UK R&B Albums (Official Charts) | 19 |
| US Billboard 200 | 11 |
| US Top R&B/Hip-Hop Albums (Billboard) | 2 |

=== Year-end charts ===
2023 year-end chart performance for The Diamond Collection
| Chart (2023) | Position |
|---|---|
| Australian Albums (ARIA) | 27 |
| New Zealand Albums (RMNZ) | 16 |
| UK Albums (OCC) | 34 |

2024 year-end chart performance for The Diamond Collection
| Chart (2024) | Position |
|---|---|
| Australian Albums (ARIA) | 12 |
| Australian Hip Hop/R&B Albums (ARIA) | 2 |
| Canadian Albums (Billboard) | 19 |
| New Zealand Albums (RMNZ) | 12 |
| UK Albums (OCC) | 28 |
| US Billboard 200 | 20 |
| US Top R&B/Hip-Hop Albums (Billboard) | 5 |

2025 year-end chart performance for The Diamond Collection
| Chart (2025) | Position |
|---|---|
| Australian Albums (ARIA) | 25 |
| Canadian Albums (Billboard) | 50 |
| UK Albums (OCC) | 32 |
| US Billboard 200 | 40 |
| US Top R&B/Hip-Hop Albums (Billboard) | 11 |

== Certifications ==
Certifications for The Diamond Collection
| Region | Certification | Certified units/sales |
|---|---|---|
| Brazil (Pro-Música Brasil) Deluxe | 5× Diamond | 800,000^{‡} |
| New Zealand (RMNZ) | 2× Platinum | 30,000^{‡} |
| United Kingdom (BPI) | Platinum | 300,000^{‡} |
^{‡} Sales+streaming figures based on certification alone.
