= Sign Me Up =

Sign Me Up may refer to:

- "Sign Me Up", a 2023 song by Post Malone from Austin
- "Sign Me Up", a 2006 song by Ne-Yo from In My Own Words
