= The Eternal Buzz =

Studio album by Post Malone
- Released: 2027
- Recorded: 2025–2026
- Labels: Republic; Mercury

Post Malone chronology
Post Malone Live from NPR's Tiny Desk (2023)	The Eternal Buzz (2027)

The Eternal Buzz is the upcoming seventh studio album by American musician Post Malone. It is set to be released in 2027, through Republic and Mercury Records. Serving as the follow-up to his previous album, F-1 Trillion (2024), it will be a double album that features 20 tracks on each disc.

== Background and promotion ==
On April 13, 2025, Post Malone was interviewed by Billboard ahead of his headlining performance at the Coachella festival in Indio, California, in which he revealed that he had been recording his new album in Nashville, Tennessee, and had already made 35 songs. His tour guitarist, Derek Wells, added that it would be a continuation of the musician's previous album, F-1 Trillion (2024), but would also include "more fiddle, pedal steel, guitar solos". In December 2025, Malone shared through a Twitch live stream that he would be releasing two albums the following year "if everything goes [his] way". He announced the album's title and number of tracks in total on April 6, 2026.
