= Chemical (Post Malone song) =

2023 single by Post Malone

Single by Post Malone

from the album Austin
- Released: April 14, 2023
- Studio: June Audio (Provo)
- Genre: Pop rock; soft rock; synth-pop
- Length: 3:04
- Label: Republic; Mercury
- Songwriters: Austin Post; Louis Bell; Andrew Wotman; William Walsh
- Producers: Post Malone; Louis Bell; Andrew Watt

Post Malone singles chronology
"I Like You (A Happier Song)" (2022)	"Chemical" (2023)	"Mourning" (2023)

Music video
- "Chemical" on YouTube

"Chemical" is a song by American musician Post Malone. It was released through Republic and Mercury Records as the lead single from his fifth studio album, Austin, on April 14, 2023. The song was produced by Malone himself, Andrew Watt, and Louis Bell, and the three wrote it alongside Billy Walsh. One week after its release, the song appeared as the last track on Malone's first compilation album, The Diamond Collection, which was released to celebrate him becoming the artist with the most diamond-certified singles by the Recording Industry Association of America (RIAA), although the song was not certified at the time of the album's release.

== Background ==
In an early 2022 interview with Billboard ahead of the release of his fourth studio album, Twelve Carat Toothache (2022), Malone expressed plans to rebuild his artistic vision, even if that meant to compromise commercial success. "Chemical" marks his first release as a lead artist since the album. On April 12, 2023, Malone posted a clip of him listening to the song on his social media and announced the release.

== Composition ==
"Chemical" is a pop rock, soft rock, and synth-pop song that sees Malone return to his trademark sound, while the song is also accompanied by an acoustic "folk-based" guitar and "contemporary pop elements". It includes a "bright and catchy" chorus, which was described as a "contrast" to his previous moodier offerings. Despite the upbeat vibe of the chorus, the lyrical content was viewed as "on-brand" for Malone, as he opens up about his inability to let go of a seemingly toxic relationship, akin to an addiction.

== Music video ==
The accompanying official music video for "Chemical", directed by Alfred Marroquin, was released on April 14, 2023. It sees Malone in different locations, including him smoking in a car like he says in the song as well as him dancing in front of a beach, desert, lightning, and cloud backdrop. In the beginning of the video he briefly walks by a nighttime backdrop. The same backdrop can be seen at the very end of the video as he's seen sitting on top of a vehicle. In the beginning of the video and towards the middle of it, someone from behind the scenes can be seen pushing the backdrops, making way for a different backdrop. Malone also posted a lyric video, in which different angles are shown. The quality of the lyric video was reduced to create a retro effect.

== Charts ==
=== Weekly charts ===
Weekly chart performance for "Chemical"
Chart (2023–2024)	Peak position
Australia (ARIA)	13
Austria (Ö3 Austria Top 40)	21
Belgium (Ultratop 50 Flanders)	11
Belgium (Ultratop 50 Wallonia)	15
Canada Hot 100 (Billboard)	8
Canada AC (Billboard)	24
Canada CHR/Top 40 (Billboard)	2
Canada Hot AC (Billboard)	5
Czech Republic Airplay (ČNS IFPI)	1
Denmark (Tracklisten)	16
Finland (Suomen virallinen lista)	44
Germany (GfK)	24
Global 200 (Billboard)	16
Hungary (Rádiós Top 40)	36
Ireland (IRMA)	12
Italy (FIMI)	93
Japan Hot Overseas (Billboard Japan)	5
Latvia Airplay (LAIPA)	3
Lithuania (AGATA)	44
Luxembourg (Billboard)	24
Netherlands (Dutch Top 40)	3
Netherlands (Single Top 100)	12
New Zealand (Recorded Music NZ)	15
Norway (VG-lista)	10
Portugal (AFP)	52
San Marino (SMRRTV Top 50)	5
Singapore (RIAS)	30
Slovakia Airplay (ČNS IFPI)	8
Slovakia Singles Digital (ČNS IFPI)	42
South Africa (TOSAC)	37
South Korea BGM (Circle)	82
South Korea Download (Circle)	108
Suriname (Nationale Top 40)	23
Sweden (Sverigetopplistan)	11
Switzerland (Schweizer Hitparade)	21
UK Singles (Official Charts)	11
US Billboard Hot 100	13
US Adult Contemporary (Billboard)	16
US Adult Pop Airplay (Billboard)	8
US Pop Airplay (Billboard)	6
US Rhythmic Airplay (Billboard)	25
US Rock & Alternative Airplay (Billboard)	13
Vietnam (Vietnam Hot 100)	96

=== Year-end charts ===
Year-end chart performance for "Chemical"
Chart (2023)	Position
Australia (ARIA)	40
Belgium (Ultratop 50 Flanders)	23
Belgium (Ultratop 50 Wallonia)	82
Canada (Canadian Hot 100)	21
Germany (Official German Charts)	60
Global 200 (Billboard)	115
Netherlands (Dutch Top 40)	2
Netherlands (Single Top 100)	32
UK Singles (OCC)	90
US Billboard Hot 100	57
US Adult Contemporary (Billboard)	33
US Adult Top 40 (Billboard)	31
US Mainstream Top 40 (Billboard)	25
US Rock Airplay (Billboard)	36

== Certifications ==
Certifications for "Chemical"
Region	Certification	Certified units/sales
Australia (ARIA)	3× Platinum	210,000^{‡}
Belgium (BRMA)	Gold	20,000^{‡}
Brazil (Pro-Música Brasil)	3× Platinum	120,000^{‡}
Denmark (IFPI Danmark)	Gold	45,000^{‡}
Germany (BVMI)	Gold	300,000^{‡}
Italy (FIMI)	Gold	50,000^{‡}
New Zealand (RMNZ)	2× Platinum	60,000^{‡}
United Kingdom (BPI)	Platinum	600,000^{‡}
^{‡} Sales+streaming figures based on certification alone.

== Release history ==
"Chemical" release history
Region	Date	Format(s)	Label	Ref.
Various	April 14, 2023	Digital download; streaming	Republic; Mercury	
United States	April 17, 2023	Hot adult contemporary radio	Republic; Mercury	
United States	April 18, 2023	Contemporary hit radio	Republic; Mercury	
