= Post Malone =

American singer and rapper (born 1995)

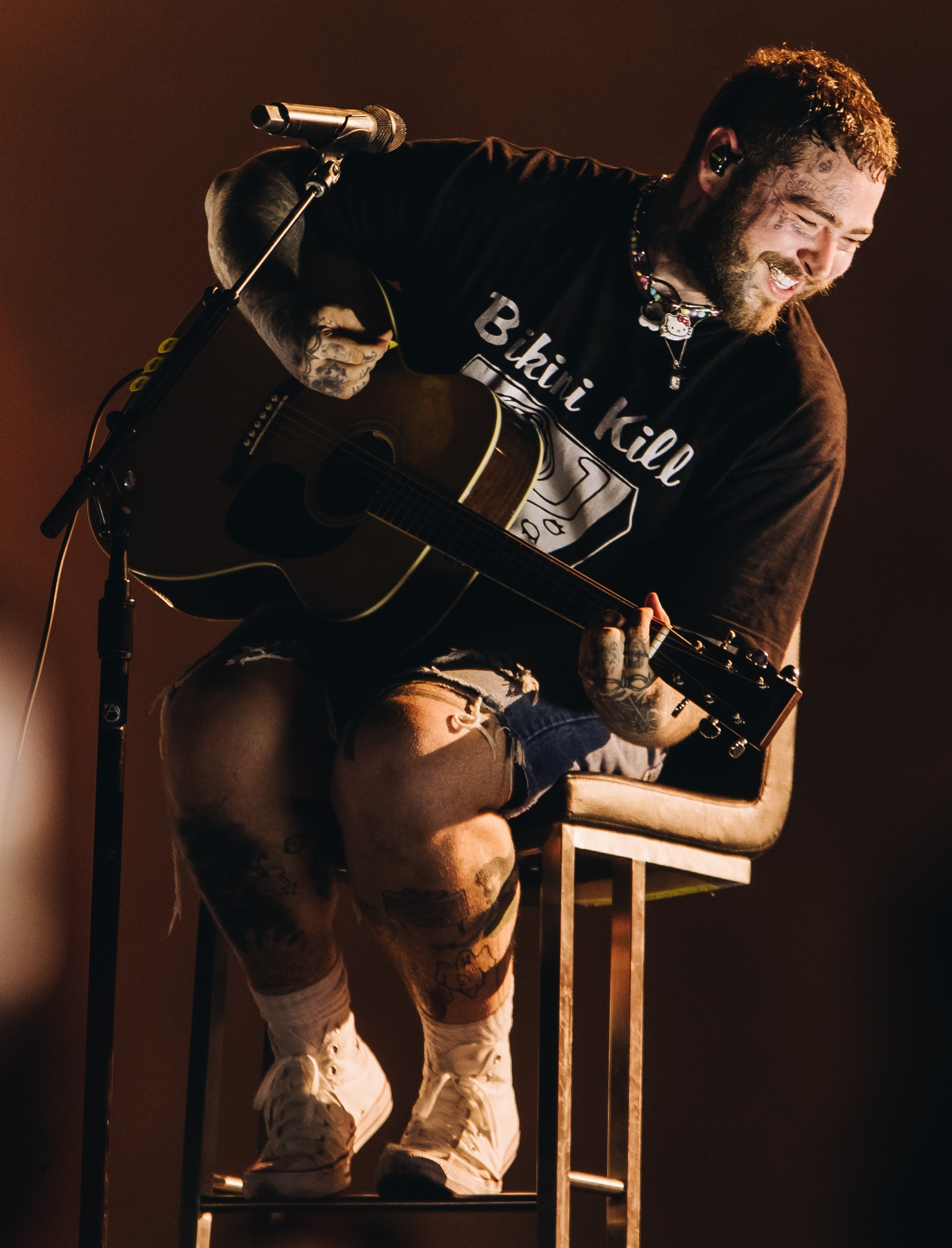
- Malone performing in 2021
- Born: Austin Richard Post; July 4, 1995 (age 31); Syracuse, New York, U.S.
- Occupations: Singer; rapper; songwriter; record producer; actor
- Years active: 2010–present
- Works: Discography; production
- Partner: Christy Lee (eng. 2026)
- Children: 1
- Awards: Full list
- Musical career
- Origin: Los Angeles, California, U.S.
- Genres: Pop; hip-hop; country; R&B
- Instruments: Vocals; guitar
- Labels: Republic; Mercury
- Formerly of: Ashley's Arrival; Love In Colors
- Website: postmalone.com

Austin Richard Post (born July 4, 1995), known professionally as Post Malone, is an American singer, rapper, songwriter, record producer, and actor. His music blends various genres including pop, hip-hop, trap, country, R&B, and rock.

Malone began his musical career in 2010, and earned mainstream recognition with his 2015 cloud rap debut single, "White Iverson". The song led him to sign with Republic Records, and served as lead single for his debut studio album, Stoney (2016), which spawned the Diamond-certified single "Congratulations" (featuring Quavo). His second album, Beerbongs & Bentleys (2018), debuted atop the US Billboard 200 and set numerous streaming records. It contained the US Billboard Hot 100 number-one singles "Rockstar" (featuring 21 Savage) and "Psycho" (featuring Ty Dolla Sign), and was nominated for Album of the Year at the 61st Grammy Awards. His third Hot 100 number-one single, "Sunflower", a duet with Swae Lee, was released for the accompanying soundtrack to the 2018 animated film Spider-Man: Into the Spider-Verse; it became the highest-certified song in RIAA history and was the first to receive a 2× Diamond certification.

Malone's third album, Hollywood's Bleeding (2019), became his second project to both debut atop the Billboard 200 and receive Grammy Award nomination for Album of the Year. It spawned the single "Circles", which spent 61 weeks on the Hot 100. Malone's fourth and fifth albums, Twelve Carat Toothache (2022) and Austin (2023), both peaked at number two on the Billboard 200. In 2024, he topped the Billboard Hot 100 twice more with his guest appearance on Taylor Swift's "Fortnight" and his first country pop song, "I Had Some Help" (featuring Morgan Wallen). The latter served as the lead single for Malone's sixth album and country music debut, F-1 Trillion (2024), which became his third number-one album on the Billboard 200."I Had Some Help" became his biggest hit after spending 6 weeks at number one and 67 total weeks on the Hot 100.

Malone is among the best-selling music artists, with over 150 million records sold in the US alone according to the RIAA. His accolades include eleven Billboard Music Awards, five American Music Awards, six MTV Video Music Awards, and eighteen Grammy Award nominations. He holds several Billboard chart records: He is the first solo lead artist to top both the Rap Airplay and Adult Contemporary charts, while "Circles" set the record for longest climb to number one (41 weeks) on the Adult Contemporary chart by a solo artist. As of 2025, Malone is second only to Drake for artists with the most diamond-certified songs, with nine to his name.

== Early life ==
Austin Richard Post was born on July 4, 1995, in Syracuse, New York. He was raised by his father, Richard Post, and his stepmother, Jodie. His father had been a DJ in his youth and introduced Malone to many genres of music including hip-hop, country, and rock. When Malone was nine years old, he and his family moved to Grapevine, Texas, after his father became the manager of concessions for the Dallas Cowboys football team. According to Malone, his first foray into professional music began when he played guitar in a local metalcore band. His interest in the genre persisted past this endeavor as he also auditioned as a guitarist for the Texas-based metalcore group Crown the Empire in 2010, but was rejected after his guitar strings broke during the audition. He credited his initial interest in learning guitar to the video game series Guitar Hero.

Malone has expressed his affinity for alternative rock music, and appeared for a DJ set at Emo Nite in Los Angeles, California, in June 2017, playing songs by My Chemical Romance at the event. He says soon afterwards he transitioned to softer rock as well as hip-hop, before beginning to experiment on FL Studio.

== Career ==
=== 2010–2016: Career beginnings, August 26th and Stoney ===
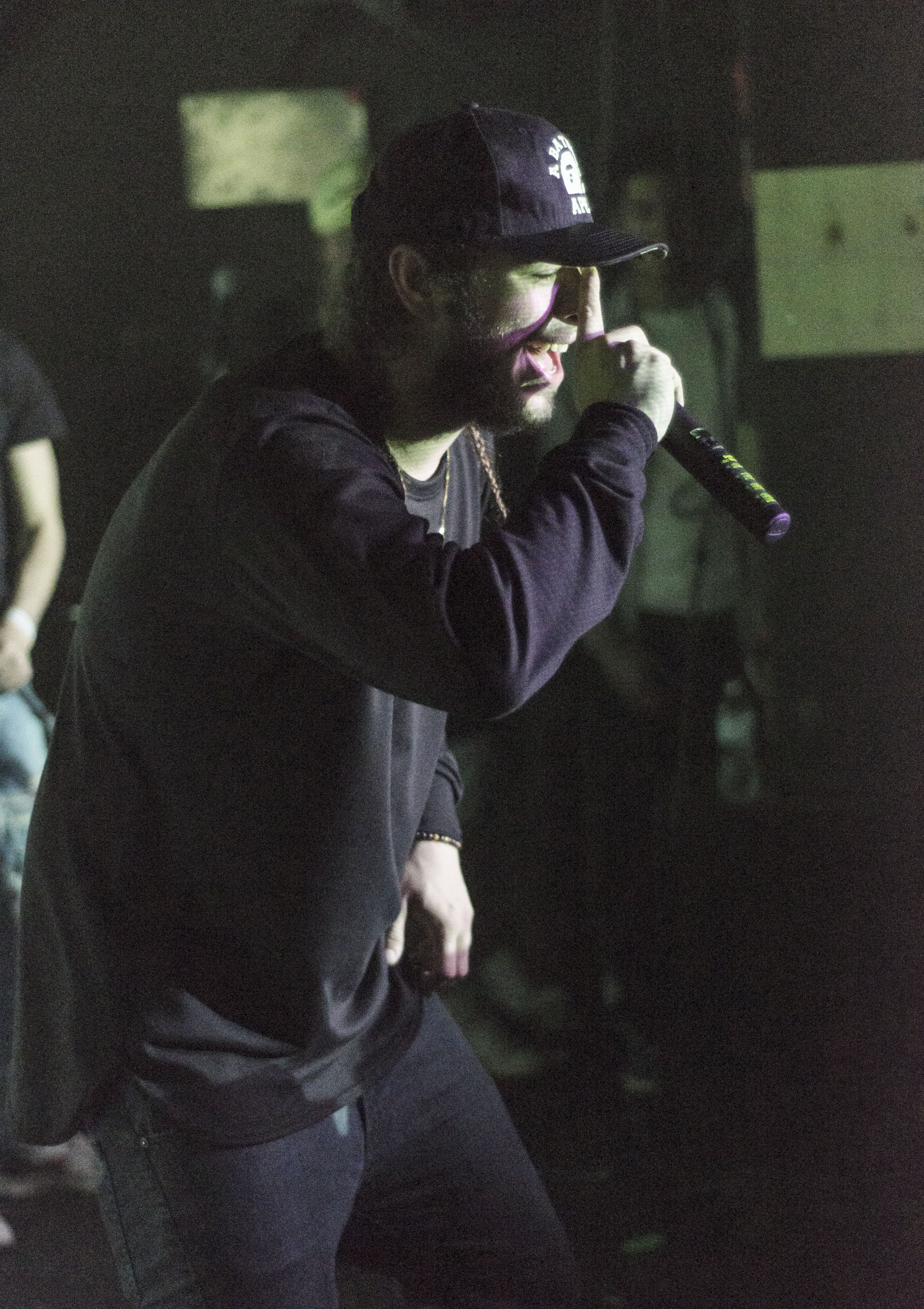
Malone performing in 2015

According to Malone, he chose "Post Malone" as his stage name when he was "14 or 15". The name was rumored to be a reference to the professional basketball player Karl Malone, but Malone later explained that "Post" is his last name, and he used a "rap name generator" to get "Malone".

In 2010, Malone reportedly played guitar in the metalcore band Ashley's Arrival (also known as Saving Summer) during his high school years. That same year, he auditioned for Crown the Empire as a guitarist. In a 2016 interview, vocalist Andy Leo recalled that Malone broke a guitar string during the audition and was not selected.

In late 2011, Malone released his oldest known solo project, an 11-track mixtape titled Manifest Destiny.

In 2013, Malone was a member of the band Love In Colors, in which he performed as a vocalist and guitarist.

At age 17, Malone, along with his friend Jazzy Eff, released a parody synth-pop ballad song called "Why Don't You Love Me" under the alias Leon DeChino, intended for a school project. The song reappeared online in 2016. Malone later referred to the DeChino alias on his song "Psycho".

At the age of 18, using audio editor Audacity, Malone released his second mixtape, Y.A.T.R., also known as Youngin' After Them Riches, in 2014. He showed it to some of his classmates at Grapevine High School. He was voted "Most Likely to Become Famous" by his classmates as a senior in high school. He worked at a Chicken Express as a teenager.

Malone later enrolled in Tarrant County College, but dropped out. After leaving college, Malone moved to Los Angeles with his longtime friend Jason Probst, a professional game streamer.

After moving to Los Angeles, Malone, Probst, and several other producers and artists formed the music group BLCKVRD and recorded music together. Several members of the group, including Malone, moved into a house in the San Fernando Valley together. While living in the San Fernando Valley, Malone met record producers FKi 1st and Sauce Lord Rich, who formed the production team FKi, as well as Rex Kudo, who produced several of Malone's tracks, including "White Iverson". Malone recorded the song two days after writing it. The lyrics of "White Iverson" allude to Basketball Hall of Fame player Allen Iverson. In February 2015, upon completion, it was uploaded to Malone's SoundCloud account. On July 19, 2015, Malone released a music video for "White Iverson". The single received praise from rappers Mac Miller and Wiz Khalifa. However the song was mocked by Earl Sweatshirt.

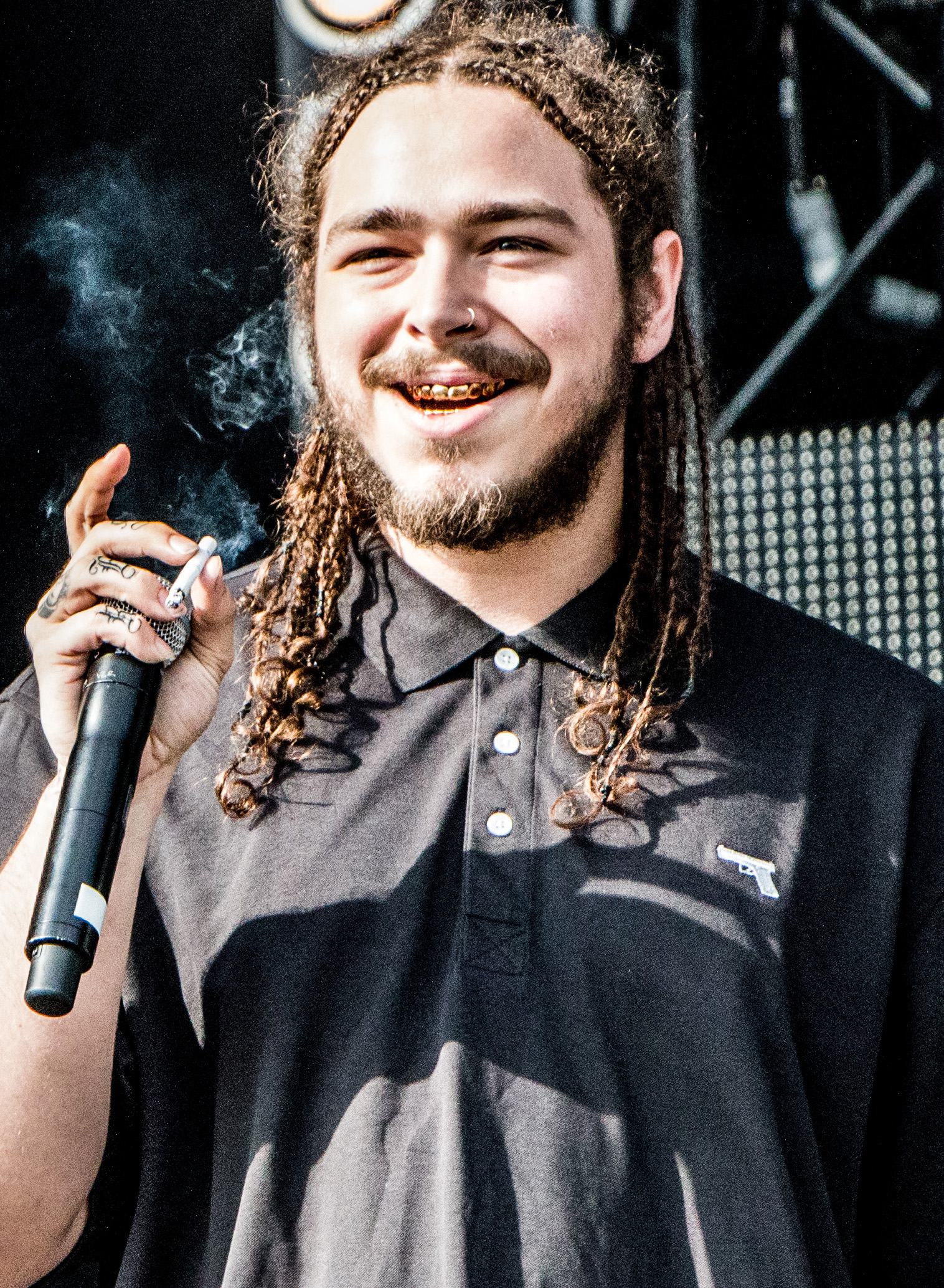
Malone at the VELD Music Festival in Canada in 2016

After hitting one million views within a month of releasing "White Iverson", Malone quickly garnered attention from record labels. In August 2015, he signed a recording contract with Republic Records. Malone went on to work with a number of prominent rappers including 50 Cent, Young Thug, Kanye West and others. In August 2015, he performed at Kylie Jenner's 18th birthday party, where he met Kanye West, who enjoyed his music, leading to him collaborating with Malone on his single "Fade" from his album The Life of Pablo (2016). Malone later began a friendship with Canadian singer Justin Bieber leading to Malone being an opening act for Bieber's Purpose World Tour (2016–17). On April 20, 2016, Malone premiered his new single, "Go Flex", on Zane Lowe's Beats 1 show.

On May 12, 2016, he released a full-length project, a mixtape, titled August 26th, the title of which was a reference to the release date of his debut album. On June 9, 2016, Malone made his national television debut on Jimmy Kimmel Live!, performing "Go Flex".

In June 2016, XXL editor-in-chief Vanessa Satten revealed Malone was considered for XXL's "2016 Freshman Class" magazine cover, but she was "told by his camp that he wasn't paying attention to hip hop so much. He was going in more of a rock/pop/country direction." However, Malone denied these claims, explaining that his latest mixtape as well as his upcoming album were both hip-hop. In August 2016, Malone issued an apology for his album, Stoney, being late. It was available for pre-order on November 4, and was finally released on December 13. Malone later called the album "mediocre", despite the success of the single "Congratulations" (featuring Quavo), Malone's first top-ten song on the Billboard Hot 100, peaking at number eight. Stoney also featured the top 100 hits "I Fall Apart" and "Deja Vu" (featuring Bieber), with the album later being certified double platinum by the RIAA in October 2017.

=== 2017–2019: Beerbongs & Bentleys and Hollywood's Bleeding ===
In February 2017, Malone revealed the title of his next project, Beerbongs & Bentleys, and was set to be released in December, before eventually being pushed back to 2018. In September, Malone released the first single from the album, "Rockstar" (featuring 21 Savage). The song peaked at number one on the Billboard Hot 100 and held the spot for eight consecutive weeks prompting Rolling Stone in 2017 to say he is "one of the most popular musicians in the country". In November of the same year, Malone released the official music video for "Rockstar", directed by Emil Nava.

On February 20, 2018, Malone previewed his new song with Ty Dolla Sign titled "Psycho". "Psycho" was released on February 23, 2018, and a tour with 21 Savage was announced. The song debuted at number 2 on the Billboard Hot 100, becoming Malone's third entry in the top 10; it would later top the charts in June of that year, becoming Malone's second number one. On April 5, 2018, Malone stated that Beerbongs & Bentleys will be released on April 27, 2018. The same day, he also premiered the song "Stay" during the Bud Lite Dive Bar show in Nashville. Upon release, Beerbongs & Bentleys broke the first day streaming records on Spotify, with 78.7 million streams worldwide. It debuted at number one on the Billboard 200 moving 461,000 album-equivalent units in its first week, with 153,000 coming from pure sales. The album was also certified platinum by the RIAA after four days and spawned three top 10 songs and six top 20 songs.

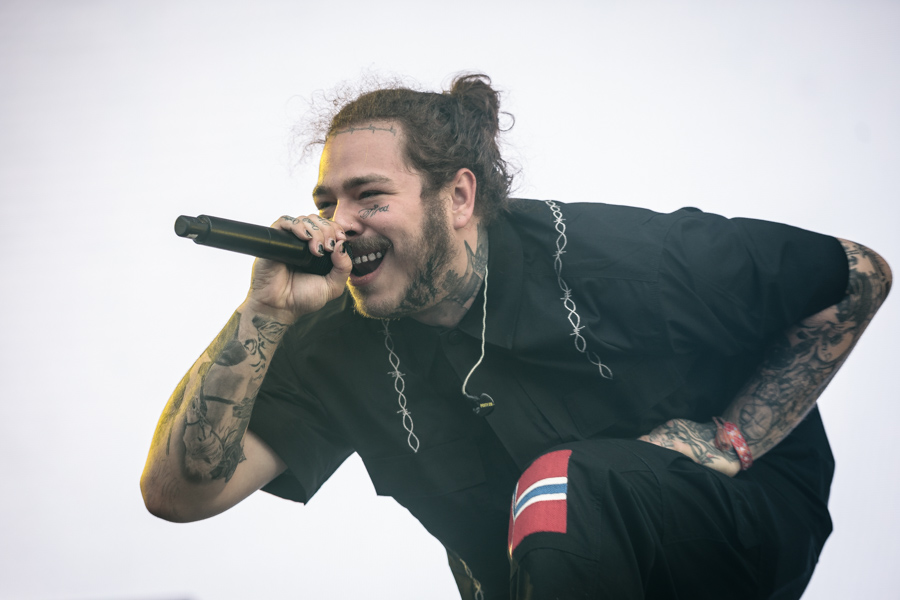
Malone performing on the main stage at Stavernfestivalen in Stavern, Norway in 2018

In an interview with Billboard in May 2018, Malone's manager announced that Malone was planning to start his own record label and film production company and Malone later won Top Rap Song at the Billboard Music Awards for "Rockstar". Malone confirmed in June 2018 that he was writing his third album, and confirmed that a festival would be taking place, organized by him, titled "Posty Fest", in Dallas, Texas on October 28. Malone promised a "blockbuster" lineup with headliners like rapper Travis Scott.

In August, Malone broke Michael Jackson's 34-year-old record for most weeks on Billboard's Top R&B/Hip-Hop Albums chart, with Stoney reaching its 77th week on the ranking compared to the 76 weeks that Thriller (1983) spent. A collaboration album with rapper Mac Miller was also teased in August 2018. During his appearance on The Tonight Show Starring Jimmy Fallon, he previewed his song "Sunflower", a collaboration with Swae Lee, from the soundtrack to the film Spider-Man: Into the Spider-Verse. In November 2018, it was confirmed Malone was recording his third album in his Utah home.

Malone was nominated for four awards at the 61st Grammy Awards for his album Beerbongs & Bentleys. Among the nominations were Album of the Year and Record of the Year. He performed with the Red Hot Chili Peppers at the awards show on February 10, 2019. In July 2019, Malone released the single "Goodbyes" (featuring Young Thug), and also announced the Runaway Tour with Swae Lee as the opener. On August 5, Malone shared a snippet of an unreleased track, "Circles", on YouTube. He then performed the song at his second annual Bud Light: Dive Bar concert and confirmed that the official song would be released the following week. That same day and on July 25, 2019, at Cheyenne Frontier Days he announced the album was finished. He released the song on August 30, 2019. He confirmed that his third studio album would be released on September 6, 2019. On August 26, 2019, Malone announced on Twitter that his third album is called Hollywood's Bleeding and would be released on September 6, 2019. The album debuted at number one on the Billboard 200, selling 489,000 album-equivalent units in its first week. Hollywood's Bleeding would also be nominated for Album of the Year at the 63rd Grammys.

=== 2020–2022: Collaborations, hiatus, and Twelve Carat Toothache ===
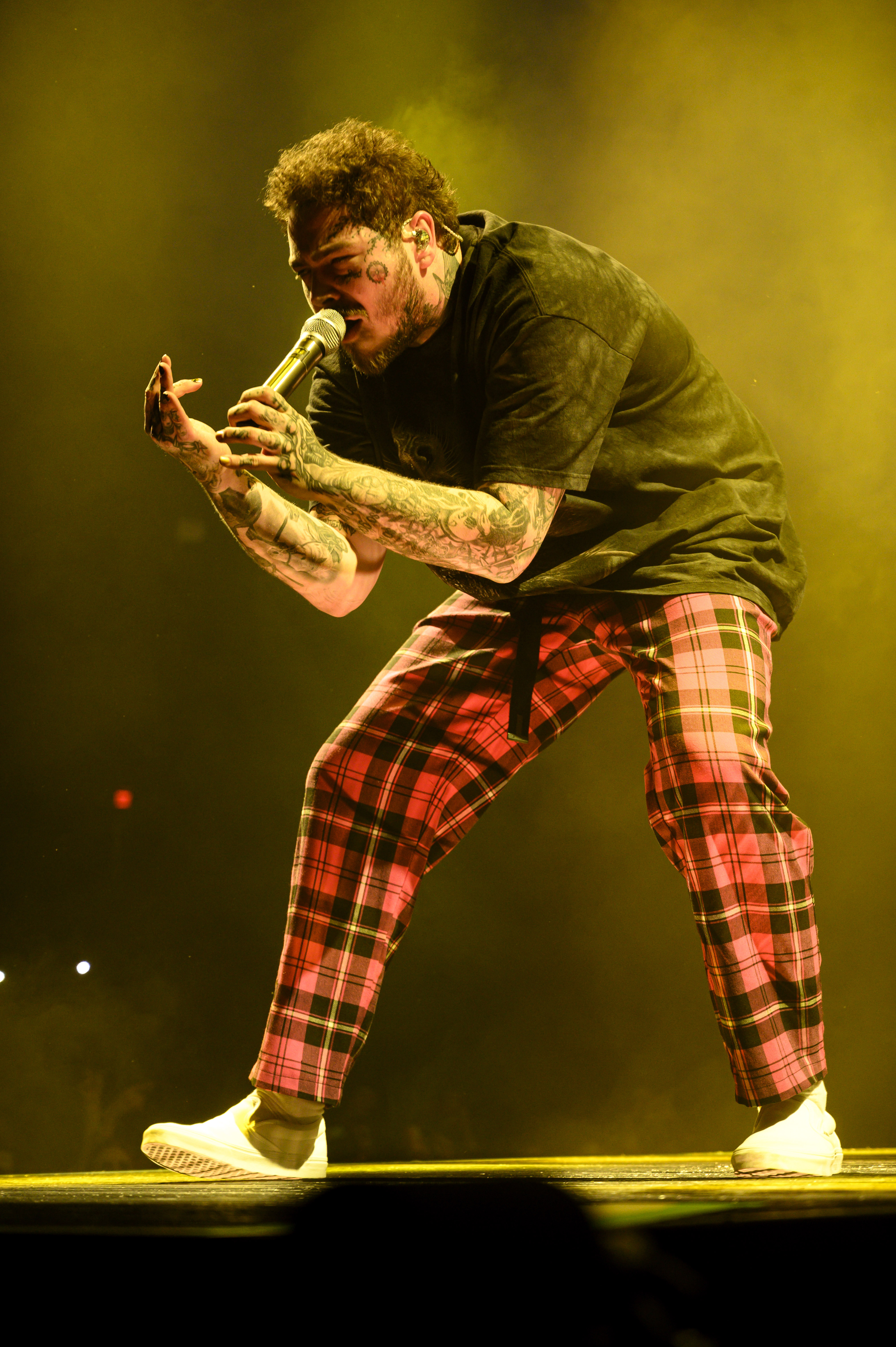
Malone performing in Rosemont, Illinois in February 2020

On March 12, 2020, Malone's concert at Denver's Pepsi Center proceeded as scheduled, drawing a sellout-crowd of 20,000, likely the last large-scale enclosed gathering in the U.S. before COVID-19 pandemic lockdowns. Malone received backlash for not cancelling his sold-out arena show amid rising concerns over the COVID-19 pandemic. Reportedly, future U.S. tour dates in March were postponed by Live Nation on March 12, 2020.

On April 24, 2020, Malone announced that a new album was in progress during a livestream performance. In late April 2020, Malone performed a livestreamed set consisting entirely of Nirvana covers from his home. Malone sang lead vocals and provided rhythm guitar for the set. He was accompanied by drummer Travis Barker, bassist Brian Lee and lead guitarist Nick Mac. The performance raised over US$5 million for the World Health Organization's COVID-19 relief fund. The performance also received praise from Nirvana's surviving members Krist Novoselic and Dave Grohl, as well as Kurt Cobain's widow Courtney Love.

In June 2020, Malone featured on Tyla Yaweh's single "Tommy Lee". The single was followed up with a remix, released July 10, 2020, featuring drums from Tommy Lee himself, as well as a re-recorded guitar instrumental. A second remix to the song, featuring rapper Saint Jhn, was released subsequently. On April 30, 2021, Malone was featured on DJ Khaled's twelfth studio album, Khaled Khaled, on the song "I Did It" also featuring DaBaby, Megan Thee Stallion, and Lil Baby.

On July 9, 2021, Malone released the single "Motley Crew" with an accompanying music video, featuring several guest stars, past collaborators and friends including Tommy Lee, Tyga, Tyla Yaweh and his manager Dre London. The music video was directed by Cole Bennett of Lyrical Lemonade. On November 5, Malone released "One Right Now" with the Weeknd, as the lead single from his upcoming fourth studio album. On January 26, 2022, during his cover story will Billboard, Malone revealed that his fourth studio album would be titled Twelve Carat Toothache. In April 2022, Republic Records relaunched Mercury Records with a new roster that includes Post Malone. On April 27, 2022, Post revealed that Twelve Carat Toothache would be released June 3, 2022. Malone released the album's second single, "Cooped Up" with Roddy Ricch, on May 12, 2022.

On May 14, 2022, he appeared as a musical guest on Saturday Night Live and performed "Cooped Up" with Ricch, as well as an unreleased song titled "Love/Hate Letter to Alcohol", in which he was joined by Fleet Foxes. Malone had previously confirmed that he had worked with Fleet Foxes frontman Robin Pecknold on a song for the album.

For the 2022 film Chip 'n Dale: Rescue Rangers, Malone covered the theme song from the 1989 television series of the same name, originally performed by Jeff Pescetto in the series and by The Jets in album releases.

On August 12, 2022, the documentary film Runaway premiered on the Amazon Prime Video channel Freevee. It showed behind the scenes moments from the first leg of the Runaway Tour in 2019, as well as performances from some of the highlighted dates, such as New York City, Chicago, and the 2019 Posty Fest in Arlington.

=== 2023: The Diamond Collection and Austin ===
In April 2023, Malone announced that he was working on a new album. On April 14, Malone released "Chemical", as the lead single from his upcoming fifth studio album. On April 21, 2023, Malone released The Diamond Collection, a nine-song compilation of his record-breaking eight RIAA Diamond-certified singles, along with the single "Chemical". On April 21, 2023, alongside The Kid Laroi, Malone appeared on "What You Say", the twenty-fourth cut of YoungBoy Never Broke Again's sixth full-length studio album, Don't Try This At Home.

On May 16, 2023, Malone announced that his fifth studio album, Austin, would be released on July 28, 2023. On May 19, "Mourning" was released as the second single from the album. On July 14, the third single, "Overdrive", was released. On September 8, the fourth single, "Enough Is Enough", was released. On July 17, 2023, Malone collaborated with Noah Kahan on a re-released version of Kahan's single "Dial Drunk" featuring a new vocal from Malone. The song charted on the Billboard Hot 100, reaching a peak of number 25.

=== 2024–present: F-1 Trillion, Post Malone Tribute to Nirvana and The Eternal Buzz ===
On February 11, 2024, Malone performed "America the Beautiful" at the Super Bowl LVIII. On February 5, the track list for Taylor Swift's eleventh studio album, The Tortured Poets Department, was revealed via her social media accounts, featuring Malone on the first track, "Fortnight". He later posted on his social media supporting this. The album was released on April 19, 2024, with "Fortnight" being chosen as the lead single and the music video being released later that day. On the day of its release, "Fortnight" set the single-day streaming record for any song on Spotify, surpassing the all-time peak previously held by Mariah Carey's song "All I Want for Christmas Is You" (1994).

On March 29, Malone was featured on the track "Levii's Jeans" off Beyoncé's eighth studio album, Cowboy Carter. On May 2, 2024, Malone announced his next single, entitled "I Had Some Help" (featuring Morgan Wallen), which released on May 10. The song earned 167 first-week adds at country radio, making it the second song in history to clear the panel in its first week after Garth Brooks in 1997 with "Longneck Bottle". It also broke Spotify's single-day country streaming record with nearly 14 million streams, debuted at No. 1 on the streaming platform's Global Daily chart and became its top male collaboration debut of all time, in addition to topping Apple Music's Global chart and Pandora's Top Thumb Hundred chart, upon release. It debuted at No. 18 on the Billboard Country Airplay chart.

On June 13, Malone announced the single "Pour Me a Drink" (featuring Blake Shelton). It was released on June 21. On June 18, Malone announced his sixth studio album, F-1 Trillion, which was released on August 16, 2024. On July 26, Malone released the third single from the album "Guy for That" (featuring Luke Combs).

On November 19, Malone announced his eighth concert tour, along with his openers, fellow American rapper, singer, and songwriter Jelly Roll and American singer-songwriter and musician Sierra Ferrell. On December 25, Malone and Beyoncé gave their first performance of "Levii's Jeans" live as part of Beyoncé's 2024 NFL Halftime Show set list. On February 17, 2025, Malone announced the European leg of the tour consisting of various festivals and headline shows, with Jelly Roll also joining as the opening act on select dates.

For the 50th anniversary celebrations for Saturday Night Live on February 14, 2025, Malone reunited with Nirvana members to perform "Smells Like Teen Spirit".

On April 12, 2025, Post Malone released his first live album titled Post Malone Tribute to Nirvana, which was exclusively released on vinyl as part of the Record Store Day. The project features recordings from a livestreamed concert originally broadcast on his YouTube channel on April 24, 2020.

On April 13, during the Coachella 2025 festival Malone announced that a new album was in progress. On April 15, Morgan Wallen announced his next single, "I Ain't Comin' Back" with Post Malone, to release on April 18. This was their second collaboration in less than a year, following "I Had Some Help".

On April 6, 2026, Malone announced his seventh studio album, The Eternal Buzz, a double album consisting of 40 tracks. On July 19, the closing ceremony of the 2026 FIFA World Cup final it was headlined by Malone. He sang the songs "Chrome Heartbreaker", "Wow" and "Sunflower" with Swae Lee.

== Musical style ==
Malone's music combines pop, hip-hop, trap, country, R&B, and rock, often falling into the styles of cloud rap, pop rap, indie folk, and rap rock. Malone's music has been described as a "melting pot of the country, grunge, hip-hop and R&B" that he grew up on, and Malone himself has been described as versatile. His vocal style has been described as "laconic". Jon Caramanica of The New York Times described Malone as "an artist who toes the line between singing and rapping, and hip-hop and spooky electric folk". Malone himself has called his music "genre-less".

Malone cites Bob Dylan, in whom he became interested around the age of 15, as an influence on his music, calling him "a genius" and "a god" though his music has been called "about as far away from Rock n' Roll as you can get". He called "Subterranean Homesick Blues" the "first rap song". He has a tattoo of Dylan as well. Malone has cited Kurt Cobain and Johnny Cash as key influences too. Malone has also cited 50 Cent, whom he called a legend, Kanye West and Key! as influences.

== Relationship with the hip-hop community ==
Malone has been called a "culture vulture" multiple times by different publications and on social media for appropriating African-American culture. California rapper Lil B wrote on Twitter in October 2017: "Post Malone is slowly turning into a white dude! Lol he's pushing it, give it a few years he gon be full country and hate blacks lol", with Malone replying in an interview, claiming that his white skin has been "used against him". In January 2018, Malone went on an intoxicated rant against people who describe him as a culture vulture. In an interview with GQ several days later, Malone said "there's a struggle being a white rapper."

In a November 2017 interview with Polish media outlet Newonce, Malone said that modern hip-hop music lacks "people talking about real shit" and added that "if you're looking to think about life, don't listen to hip-hop." He was criticized for his comments, including by fellow rappers Lil B and Vince Staples. Malone later appeared in a video on Twitter, saying that the reason for his comments was that it was a "beer-tasting" interview, and going on to say that he loves hip-hop. Newonce, however, denied that claim, stating that Malone barely drank at all during the interview. In the follow-up Malone said, "What I was saying was that when I wanna sit down and cry, I sit down and I listen to Bob Dylan and his guitar. Just like everyone else, no matter how hard you are, no matter where you're from, you're gonna have times where you sit back and reflect on your life and you listen to what you wanna listen to. For me, that's Bob Dylan."

== Other ventures ==
Since 2018, Malone has released several collaborations with footwear company Crocs. The fifth and latest collaboration was released in December 2020.

During his Runaway Tour in 2019, he released special-edition Bud Light beer cans at local stores in 15 cities. He also released multiple lines of sunglasses in collaboration with Arnette.

In December 2019, Malone collaborated with Howlin' Ray's to launch a limited-edition hot chicken sandwich called the "Ghost Malone", which is made with ghost pepper jack cheese and was exclusively available on Postmates. Malone stated that he had been eating at Howlin Ray's since he first came to Los Angeles and "When we first started talking about my own sandwich, I couldn't believe it and the name just came to me right away."

In May 2020, he launched his own line of French rosé wine, Maison No. 9, named after his favourite tarot card, the Nine of Swords. It sold out in two days upon being made available for sale. In August 2020, Post Malone invested in Envy Gaming. He became a co-owner of the organization.

An enthusiast of the collectible trading card game Magic: The Gathering, he collaborated with publisher Wizards of the Coast in 2022 to create two special supplemental sets: "Secret Lair x Post Malone: Backstage Pass", with cards featuring himself in the title and art, and "Secret Lair x Post Malone: The Lands", with cards featuring his tattoos in the art and flavor texts written by him. He also owns the unique One Ring card, which he purchased for more than $2 million.

In April 2023, Malone designed the exterior of a Raising Cane's restaurant location in Midvale, Utah.

In February 2025, Malone and Mondelez International collaborated to create limited edition Oreo cookies featuring salted caramel and shortbread flavored creme, and 9 cookie designs themed after him.

== Personal life ==
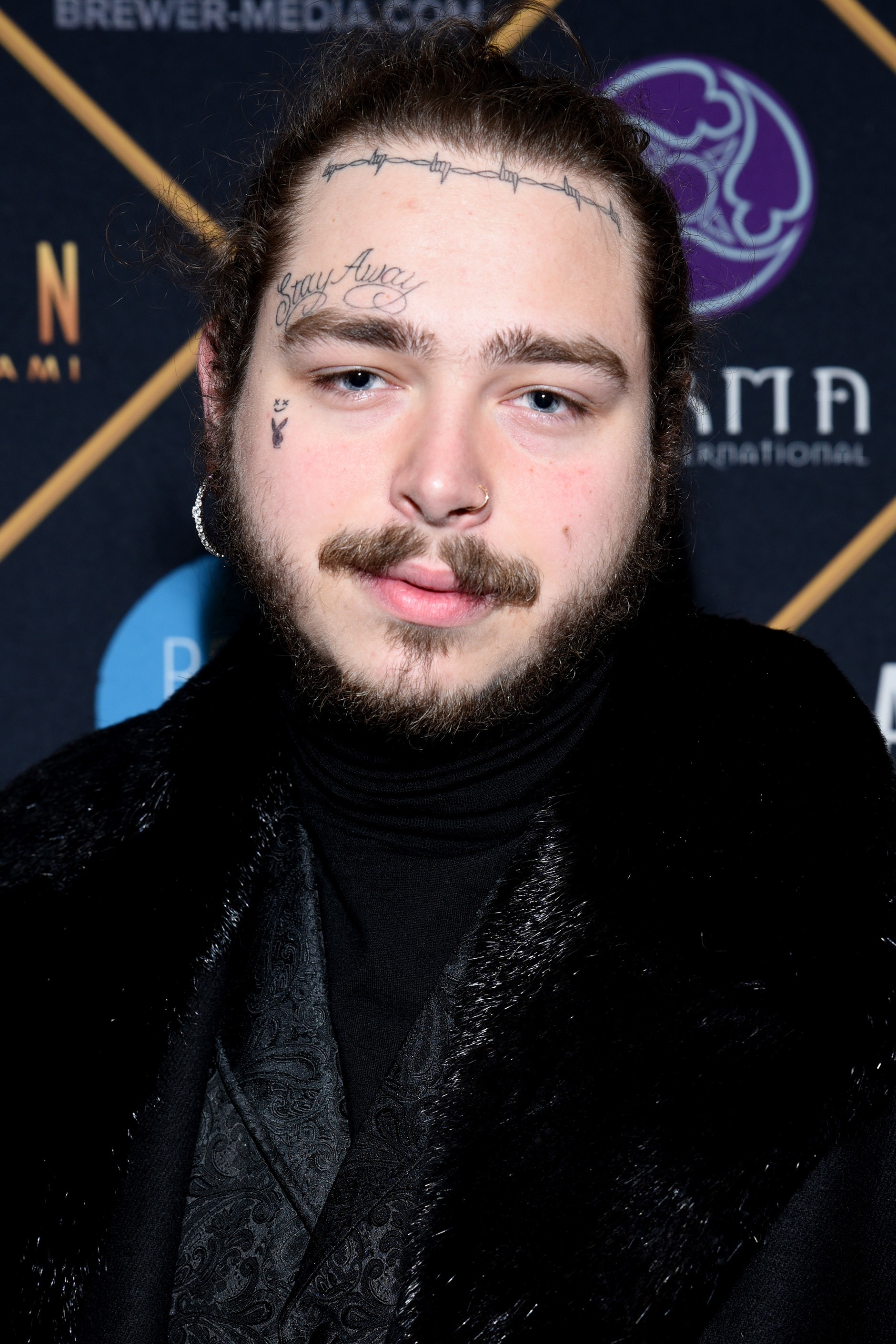
Malone in 2018

As of 2019, Malone resided in Cottonwood Heights, Utah, in a multimillion-dollar 12,700-square-foot (1,180 m^{2}) home. His former home in Los Angeles' San Fernando Valley was burglarized on September 1, 2018.

On August 21, 2018, Malone boarded a plane leaving Teterboro Airport and was scheduled to land at London Luton Airport. The tires blew out during takeoff and the plane was rerouted to Stewart International Airport for an emergency landing. The plane landed safely. Once the plane had landed, Malone tweeted about the incident, writing "i landed guys. thank you for your prayers. can't believe how many people wished death on me on this website. fuck you. but not today."

Malone was involved in a car crash on September 8, 2018. Malone's white Rolls-Royce Wraith was driving through Santa Monica, California in the early morning when it collided with another car at 3:30 am. Although no one was severely injured in the incident, several people were treated for minor injuries.

Malone was in a three-year relationship with Ashlen Diaz, ending in November 2018. In May 2022, Malone announced that he was expecting his first child with his current girlfriend. In June, during an appearance on The Howard Stern Show, Malone revealed that he and his girlfriend are engaged and had welcomed a daughter. Malone has the initials of his child, "DDP", tattooed on his forehead. The song "Yours" on his album F-1 Trillion is inspired by his daughter as he envisions her getting married when she is older. In March 2025, it was revealed that he and his fiancée had quietly split at the end of 2024. His ex-fiancée, later identified as Hee Sung "Jamie" Park, filed documents in Los Angeles in April 2025 asking the court to award her primary physical custody of their daughter. In those documents, Park checked boxes indicating that she is okay with sharing custody (if not awarded full custody) and allowing Malone to have visitations, also known as "parenting time." In the documents, Park also said that their daughter has been living with her since November 2024, and also wants Malone to cover her legal fees. On August 17, 2026, Malone got engaged to Christy Lee, a Parsons School of Design student.

=== Health ===
In March 2020, a video surfaced that showed Malone falling and behaving oddly on stage to his song, "I Fall Apart", which made fans worry about his well-being and health. Malone later said that he was "not on drugs and I feel the best I've ever fucking felt in my life". His manager Dre London likewise claimed there was no need to worry and that Malone's behavior was part of the "act". Malone's father Richard said that he does not "want to come across as dismissive to those of you who have expressed concern about Austin. Your sincerity and kindness regarding him is certainly heartwarming and appreciated."

During his 2022 interview with Howard Stern, Malone revealed he has long struggled with alcoholism, but has recovered with the help of his fiancée.

Post Malone has stated that he has depersonalization disorder induced by marijuana use, a known possible side effect of marijuana use.

=== Tattoos ===
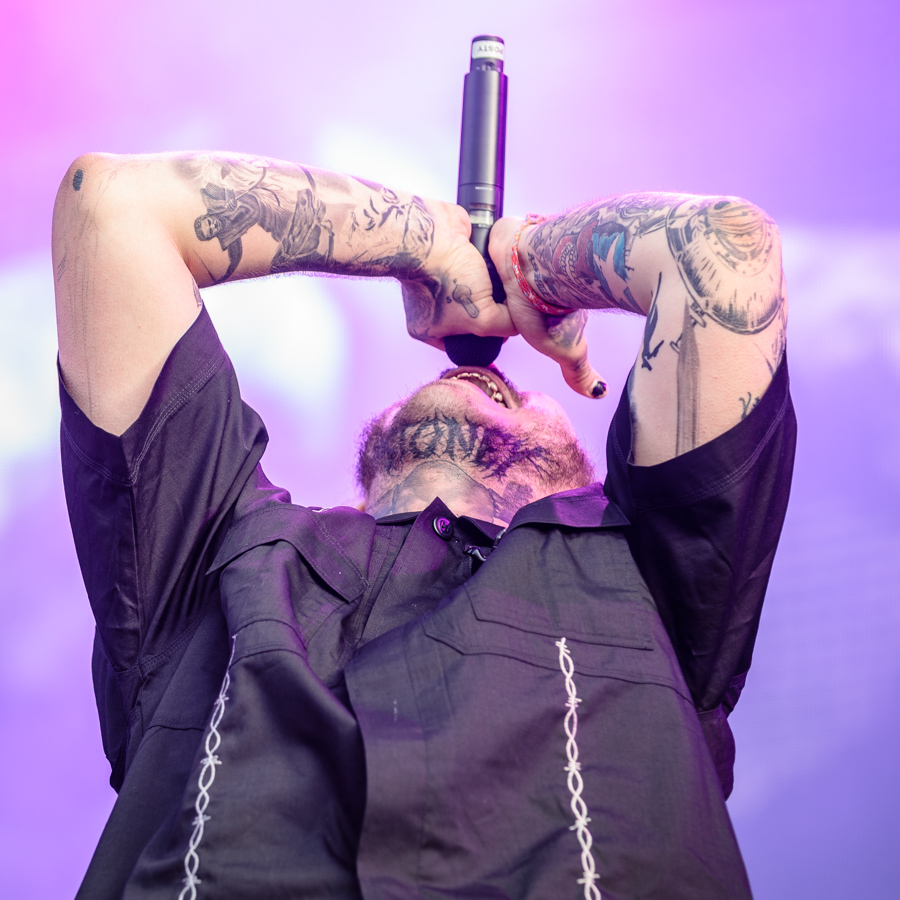
The tattoo under Post Malone's chin reads "STONEY", namesake of his debut album.

Malone has a number of tattoos that he inked himself and has also inked tattoos on several friends and acquaintances. As of early 2021, he has at least 78 tattoos.

=== Political views ===
Malone has a tattoo of U.S. president John F. Kennedy on his arm, and has said that Kennedy was "the only President to speak out against the crazy corruption stuff that's going on in our government nowadays." In December 2016, Malone stated that if asked to perform at Donald Trump's presidential inauguration the following month he would not have been opposed, though felt neither Trump nor Hillary Clinton were fit for president of the United States and expressed his support for Bernie Sanders during the election cycle.

Malone later expressed a dislike for Trump in a November 2017 interview for Rolling Stone. In the same interview, he revealed that he has a large collection of guns and believes it is an American right to own and operate guns. Malone also expressed a strong interest in conspiracy theories when he said, "There's crazy shit that goes on that we can't explain." During a trip to Canada in 2018, Malone was interviewed and when asked what the "biggest lie is", he replied "The biggest lie in the world is the U.S. government. It's a fucking reality show and I think there's gonna be a lot of weird shit that happens within our generation that really changes the way of the world."

=== Religious views ===
Post Malone grew up in a Christian household in a family of church attendees. As of November 2017, he is not religiously affiliated.

== Filmography ==
Film
Year	Title	Role	Notes
2018	Spider-Man: Into the Spider-Verse	Brooklyn Bystander (voice)	Cameo
2020	Spenser Confidential	Squeeb	Credited as Austin Post
2021	Wrath of Man	Robber #6	
2022	Runaway	Self	
2023	Spider-Man: Across the Spider-Verse	Brooklyn Bystander (voice)	Uncredited cameo; archive recording from Into the Spider-Verse.
2023	Teenage Mutant Ninja Turtles: Mutant Mayhem	Ray Fillet (voice)	Credited as Austin Post
2024	This Is Me... Now: A Love Story	Leo	
2024	Kids Are Growing Up: A Story About a Kid Named Laroi	Self	Documentary
2024	Road House	Carter Ford	Credited as Austin Post
2024	Dear Santa	Self	
2025	Happy Gilmore 2	DJ Omar Gosh	

Television
Year	Title	Role	Notes
2017–2019	FishCenter Live	Self	2 appearances Musical guest
2018	Ghost Adventures	Self	"The Slaughter House"
2022	Saturday Night Live	Musical guest	Season 47, episode 20: "Selena Gomez/Post Malone"
2023	Impractical Jokers	Self	Episode: "Post Malone"
2024	Tales of the Teenage Mutant Ninja Turtles	Ray Fillet (voice)	Credited as Austin Post
2025	SNL50: The Homecoming Concert	Self	Musical guest
2026	Strom on Sesame Street	Self	Musical guest

Video games
Year	Title	Notes	Ref.
2024	WWE 2K24	Soundtrack Curator and DLC – "Post Malone & Friends Pack"	
2024	Hunt: Showdown 1896	Event – "Post Malone's Murder Circus" (as The Deposed King & Ringmaster)	
2025	Hunt: Showdown 1896	Event – "Post Malone's Murder Circus Encore" (as the Disciple of Death)	

== Discography ==
Studio albums

- Stoney (2016)
- Beerbongs & Bentleys (2018)
- Hollywood's Bleeding (2019)
- Twelve Carat Toothache (2022)
- Austin (2023)
- F-1 Trillion (2024)
- The Eternal Buzz (2027)

== Tours ==
=== Headlining ===
- Hollywood Dreams Tour (2016)
- Stoney Tour (2017)
- Beerbongs & Bentleys Tour (2018–2019)
- Runaway Tour (2019–2020)
- Twelve Carat Tour (2022–2023)
- ''If Y'all Weren't Here, I'd Be Crying'' Tour (2023)
- F-1 Trillion Tour (2024)
- Big Ass Stadium Tour (2025)
- Big Ass Stadium Tour 2 (2026)

=== Opening act ===
- Fetty Wap – Welcome to The Zoo Tour (2016)
- Justin Bieber – Purpose World Tour (2016)
- Future – Future Hndrxx Tour (2017)
- Red Hot Chili Peppers – Global Stadium Tour (2023)
