= Enough Is Enough (Post Malone song) =

2023 single by Post Malone

Single by Post Malone

from the album Austin
- Released: September 8, 2023
- Genre: Pop; indie pop
- Length: 2:45
- Label: Republic
- Songwriters: Austin Post; William Walsh; Louis Bell; Max Martin; Rami Yacoub
- Producers: Post Malone; Louis Bell; Rami Yacoub; Max Martin

Post Malone singles chronology
"Dial Drunk" (2023)	"Enough Is Enough" (2023)	"Pickup Man" (2023)

Lyric video
- "Enough Is Enough" on YouTube

"Enough Is Enough" is a song by American musician Post Malone. It was sent to Italian contemporary hit radio through Republic and Mercury Records as the fourth and final single from his fifth studio album, Austin, on September 8, 2023. The song was produced by Malone himself, Louis Bell, Max Martin, and Rami Yacoub, and the four wrote it alongside Billy Walsh.

== Composition and lyrics ==
"Enough Is Enough" is a pop and indie pop song built over a guitar melody that Malone played himself and an electric piano melody with Jack Antonoff-inspired drums, in which he sings about his struggles with alcohol: "2 A.M., they ran out of lemonade / So I shot that vodka straight anyway". The song is an introspective track that sees him showing remorse for drinking in the past. Clayton Purdom of Rolling Stone described the chorus of the song to be "endearingly Toto-esque" and catchy.

== Charts ==
=== Weekly charts ===
Weekly chart performance for "Enough Is Enough"
Chart (2023)	Peak position
Australia (ARIA)	62
Canada Hot 100 (Billboard)	52
Czech Republic Airplay (ČNS IFPI)	16
Global 200 (Billboard)	62
Ireland (IRMA)	57
Netherlands (Dutch Top 40)	26
Netherlands (Single Top 100)	95
New Zealand Hot Singles (RMNZ)	7
Norway (VG-lista)	20
Portugal (AFP)	168
San Marino (SMRRTV Top 50)	12
Slovakia Airplay (ČNS IFPI)	97
Sweden (Sverigetopplistan)	36
UK Singles (OCC)	52
US Billboard Hot 100	56
US Hot Rock & Alternative Songs (Billboard)	5

=== Year-end charts ===
Year-end chart performance for "Enough Is Enough"
Chart (2023)	Position
US Hot Rock & Alternative Songs (Billboard)	80

== Certifications ==
Region	Certification	Certified units/sales
Australia (ARIA)	Gold	35,000^{‡}
Brazil (Pro-Música Brasil)	Gold	20,000^{‡}
^{‡} Sales+streaming figures based on certification alone.

== Release history ==
Release history for "Enough Is Enough"
Region	Date	Format	Label	Ref.
Italy	September 8, 2023	Radio airplay	Universal	
