= Levii's Jeans =

2024 song by Beyoncé and Post Malone

Song by Beyoncé and Post Malone

from the album Cowboy Carter
- Released: March 29, 2024
- Studio: Electric Feel (Los Angeles); Westlake Recording (West Hollywood, California)
- Genre: Country pop; R&B
- Length: 4:17
- Label: Parkwood; Columbia
- Composers: Beyoncé; Nile Rodgers; Terius Gesteelde-Diamant
- Lyricists: Beyoncé; Austin Post; Gesteelde-Diamant; Shawn Carter
- Producers: Beyoncé; The-Dream

Lyric video
- "Levii's Jeans" on YouTube

"Levii's Jeans" is a song by American singer Beyoncé and American rapper and singer Post Malone. It is the seventeenth track on her eighth studio album, Cowboy Carter (2024), which was released on March 29, 2024, through Parkwood Entertainment and Columbia Records. The song is named after the jeans of American clothing brand Levi Strauss & Co.

At the 67th Annual Grammy Awards the song was nominated for Best Pop Duo/Group Performance, becoming Beyoncé's first nomination in the category and Malone's third.

== Background and composition ==
Many interpreted the song as an ode to fashion retailer Levi Strauss & Co., as they were one of the only fashion brands to support Destiny's Child early in their career (as they struggled to be styled by high-end designers and brands when breaking into the music industry), appearing in a popular Levi's "Low Rise Jeans" advertising campaign.

The song was written by the singers themselves with Jay-Z and The-Dream, with collaboration on the composition by Nile Rodgers. In an interview with The New York Times, Malone explained that he and Beyoncé did not meet to write the lyrics, instead he received part of the demo of the song directly to his home in Utah from a Parkwood Entertainment representative, talking to Beyoncé by calls and texts.

== Critical reception ==
The song was considered among the best tracks on the album, as well as among the best collaborations by both singers. Critics noted that the song is Malone's first non-covered song concerning the country genre.

Tyler Chin of GQ appreciated "using the iconic dungarees as a metaphor for the love of her life" and that the association with the jeans "makes perfect sense for her to pay tribute to the preferred bottoms of old west gunslingers and modern-day ranch hands alike", finding the juxtaposition of Post Malone's "vibrato-wielding" to Beyoncé "sensual". Ken Tucker of NPR Music stated that the collaboration is "a deceptively simple tune " which "sounds like a great, lost, hit single from the '60s". Spencer Kornhaber of The Atlantic wrote that the song "sounds like the product of the modern Nashville music machine" with "sort of warm, sexy R&B", describing it as a "deliciously ironic fashion".

== Levi's campaign ==
After the track's release on Cowboy Carter, Levi's changed their Instagram name to "Levii's", adding an extra "i" to match the stylized title of the song. They then saw an opportunity to better market their brand to a female audience by using the song commercially. On September 30, 2024, the brand announced a global campaign with Beyoncé titled "Reiimagine" that will stretch into 2025. It is based on women's history with the brand and is split into four "chapters", the first being a reimagined commercial of the company's 1985 "Laundrette" television spot. Levi's have described the partnership as "the biggest one [they've] ever done," and expect Beyoncé's impact to help bring in a boost to $2 billion in sales. The first commercial starring Beyoncé amassed 2.4 billion impressions in under a month.

== Live performances ==
=== 2024 NFL Halftime show ===
On December 25, 2024, Beyoncé and Post Malone gave their first performance of "Levii's Jeans" live as part of Beyoncé's 2024 NFL Halftime Show set list.

=== Cowboy Carter Tour ===
Starting April 28, 2025, Beyoncé performed "Levii's Jeans" as part of the Cowboy Carter Tour setlist.

== Commercial performance ==
"Levii's Jeans" debuted at number 16 on the Billboard Hot 100 and at number 5 on the Hot Country Songs, becoming Beyoncé's fourth top-five song on the Hot Country Songs, charting simultaneously at "Texas Hold 'Em", "II Most Wanted", and "Jolene". It also became Malone's first top-ten song on the Hot Country Songs and his second entry after his re-recording of the song "Pickup Man" by Joe Diffie, which peaked at number 34.

== Charts ==
Chart performance for "Levii's Jeans"
Chart (2024)	Peak position
Canada Hot 100 (Billboard)	41
France (SNEP)	169
Global 200 (Billboard)	20
Portugal (AFP)	70
US Billboard Hot 100	16
US Hot Country Songs (Billboard)	5

== Certifications ==
Certifications for "Levii's Jeans"
Region	Certification	Certified units/sales
Brazil (Pro-Música Brasil)	Platinum	40,000^{‡}
^{‡} Sales+streaming figures based on certification alone.
