= Overdrive (Post Malone song) =

2023 single by Post Malone

Single by Post Malone

from the album Austin
- Released: July 14, 2023
- Genre: Pop; soft rock
- Length: 2:28
- Label: Republic; Mercury
- Songwriters: Austin Post; Louis Bell; Andrew Wotman; William Walsh
- Producers: Post Malone; Louis Bell; Andrew Watt

Post Malone singles chronology
"Mourning" (2023)	"Overdrive" (2023)	"Dial Drunk" (2023)

"Overdrive" is a song by American musician Post Malone. It was released through Republic and Mercury Records as the third single from his fifth studio album, Austin, on July 14, 2023. The song was produced by Malone himself, Andrew Watt, and Louis Bell, and the three wrote it alongside Billy Walsh.

== Charts ==
=== Weekly charts ===
Weekly chart performance for "Overdrive"
Chart (2023–2024)	Peak position
Australia (ARIA)	68
Canada Hot 100 (Billboard)	44
Global 200 (Billboard)	55
Iceland (Tónlistinn)	31
Ireland (IRMA)	47
Japan Hot Overseas (Billboard Japan)	7
Netherlands (Single Tip)	3
New Zealand Hot Singles (RMNZ)	4
Norway (VG-lista)	27
South Korea BGM (Circle)	64
South Korea Download (Circle)	118
Sweden (Sverigetopplistan)	50
UK Singles (OCC)	45
US Billboard Hot 100	47
US Hot Rock & Alternative Songs (Billboard)	5

=== Year-end charts ===
Year-end chart performance for "Overdrive"
Chart (2023)	Position
US Hot Rock & Alternative Songs (Billboard)	60

== Certifications ==
Certifications for "Overdrive"
Region	Certification	Certified units/sales
Brazil (Pro-Música Brasil)	Gold	20,000^{‡}
New Zealand (RMNZ)	Gold	15,000^{‡}
^{‡} Sales+streaming figures based on certification alone.
