= Mourning (Post Malone song) =

2023 single by Post Malone

Single by Post Malone

from the album Austin
- Released: May 19, 2023
- Genre: Trap-pop
- Length: 2:28
- Label: Republic; Mercury
- Songwriters: Austin Post; Louis Bell; Andrew Wotman
- Producers: Post Malone; Louis Bell; Andrew Watt

Post Malone singles chronology
| "Chemical" (2023) | "Mourning" (2023) | "Overdrive" (2023) |

Music video
- "Mourning" on YouTube

"Mourning" is a song by American musician Post Malone. It was released through Republic and Mercury Records as the second single from his fifth studio album, Austin, on May 19, 2023. The song was produced by Malone himself, Andrew Watt, and Louis Bell. Malone announced the song four days before its release and also announced the album. The music video was shot in Scotland when he was there to perform for his Twelve Carat Tour, which he described as "absolutely stunning".

== Composition and lyrics ==
On the trap-pop song, Malone sings about drinking while having late night parties and hurting the morning after. The song is centered around a two-chord progression and he expresses his desire to stay drunk and not want to become sober, while he also calls out fake friends who only want him for his money and expensive lifestyle. Malone also feels that he does not know how to speak to anybody about what he is going through.

== Charts ==
=== Weekly charts ===
Weekly chart performance for "Mourning"
| Chart (2023–2024) | Peak position |
|---|---|
| Australia (ARIA) | 50 |
| Australia Hip Hop/R&B (ARIA) | 12 |
| Canada Hot 100 (Billboard) | 40 |
| Global 200 (Billboard) | 44 |
| Ireland (IRMA) | 31 |
| Japan Hot Overseas (Billboard Japan) | 11 |
| Lebanon (Lebanese Top 20) | 19 |
| Netherlands (Single Top 100) | 78 |
| New Zealand (Recorded Music NZ) | 31 |
| Norway (VG-lista) | 27 |
| Portugal (AFP) | 170 |
| South Korea BGM (Circle) | 197 |
| South Korea Download (Circle) | 142 |
| Sweden (Sverigetopplistan) | 55 |
| Switzerland (Schweizer Hitparade) | 71 |
| UK Singles (OCC) | 35 |
| US Billboard Hot 100 | 36 |
| US Adult Pop Airplay (Billboard) | 40 |
| US Pop Airplay (Billboard) | 18 |
| US Rhythmic Airplay (Billboard) | 8 |

=== Year-end charts ===
Year-end chart performance for "Mourning"
| Chart (2023) | Position |
|---|---|
| US Rhythmic (Billboard) | 46 |

== Certifications ==
Certifications for "Mourning"
| Region | Certification | Certified units/sales |
|---|---|---|
| Australia (ARIA) | Gold | 35,000^{‡} |
| New Zealand (RMNZ) | Gold | 15,000^{‡} |
| Brazil (Pro-Música Brasil) | Gold | 20,000^{‡} |
^{‡} Sales+streaming figures based on certification alone.
