= Austin (album) =

Studio album by Post Malone
- Released: July 28, 2023
- Studio: Henson (Los Angeles)
- Genres: Pop; indie pop; pop rock
- Length: 51:27
- Labels: Mercury; Republic
- Producers: Post Malone; Andrew Watt; Louis Bell; Max Martin; Rami Yacoub

Post Malone chronology
The Diamond Collection (2023)	Austin (2023)	F-1 Trillion (2024)

Singles from Austin
- 1. "Chemical" Released: April 14, 2023; 2. "Mourning" Released: May 19, 2023; 3. "Overdrive" Released: July 14, 2023; 4. "Enough Is Enough" Released: September 8, 2023

Austin is the fifth studio album by American musician Post Malone. It was released through Mercury and Republic Records on July 28, 2023. The bonus version of the album was released five days later, and included a new track. Production was handled by Malone himself, Andrew Watt, Louis Bell, Max Martin, and Rami Yacoub. Austin was supported by four singles: "Chemical", "Mourning", "Overdrive", and "Enough Is Enough". A departure from the hip-hop and R&B-influenced sounds of its predecessors, it is a guitar-based pop, indie pop, and pop rock album, and is Malone's first and only project not to feature any guest appearances.

Austin received generally positive reviews from music critics and debuted at number two on Billboard 200 chart, in which it earned 113,000 album-equivalent units, of which 34,000 units were pure album sales.

== Background and promotion ==
On May 15, 2023, Malone posted a video on Instagram to announce the album, which is titled after his real first name. The message hinted at a different artistic approach, possibly intensifying the sound of his fourth studio album, Twelve Carat Toothache (2022). Malone revealed that he played the guitar on every single song on the album, calling the creation process a "fun experience". He described the outcome as the "most challenging and rewarding music" he had ever made, which was a product of constantly making himself work to make it. That same day, Malone also announced a summer North American tour called the If Y'all Weren't Here, I'd Be Crying Tour to accompany the release of the album, which later became a world tour that started on July 8 and ended on December 3, 2023.

=== Singles ===
On April 14, 2023, Malone released the lead single of the album, "Chemical". The second single of the album, "Mourning", was released on May 19. The third single, "Overdrive", was released on July 14. The fourth and final single, "Enough Is Enough", was sent to Italian contemporary hit radio, on September 8, 2023.

== Critical reception ==
Professional ratings
Aggregate scores
Source	Rating
AnyDecentMusic?	5.5/10
Metacritic	66/100
Review scores
Source	Rating
AllMusic	4.5/5 stars
American Songwriter	3.5/5 stars
Clash	7/10
Hot Press	8/10
The Independent	2/5 stars
NME	4/5 stars
The Observer	3/5 stars
Pitchfork	5.5/10
Slant Magazine	2/5 stars
Spectrum Culture	40%

According to the review aggregator Metacritic, Austin received "generally favorable reviews" based on a weighted average score of 66 out of 100 from ten critic scores. Aggregator AnyDecentMusic? gave it 5.5 out of 10, based on their assessment of the critical consensus.

Neil Z. Yeung of AllMusic praised the album, stating, "Melodic and heartfelt, Austin surprises at nearly every turn, whether that's by an unexpected sonic detour or the simple fact that Post Malone has never sounded this fearless". Erica Campbell of NME wrote that Malone's "shift from trap beats and hip-hop delivery to purer pop suits [him] well, proving that slowing down can be a creative advantage, especially when you're heading in the right direction", while Clash's Robin Murray described Austin as "an album that dares to buck trends, and at its best can be genuinely moving". Variety critic Chris Willman said, "It sounds like sobering stuff on paper. But on record, a lot of these songs play out as breezily as Styles' "As It Was". It's a record that's in constant conflict with itself, using candor and humor as a self-conscious form of denial, maybe; the easygoing infectiousness of the music always is reassuring us that there's nothing to worry about amid all this conspicuous consumption". Reviewing the album for American Songwriter, Thomas Galindo stated, "While his 17 new songs don't amount to a flawless masterpiece, they do paint a picture of a Post Malone who not only knows he needs to turn things around, but also intends to at any cost".

Rolling Stone's Clayton Purdom wrote that "even if Austin is Post's guitar record, it's not his rock record", and found that "plenty of it works" even if "the immense self-loathing with which the record introduces itself finds no clear resolution by the end, despite many allusions on otherwise-peppy songs". Paul Attard of Slant Magazine commented that "little on the album could be regarded as hip-hop-oriented" as its tracks "are primarily structured around stadium-sized pop hooks", which he found "all follow the same overly simplistic pop structure". Writing for Pitchfork, Brad Shoup felt that Austin "is Post at his strongest: audaciously raiding the entire pop toolkit" and "even after forsaking Los Angeles for Utah, his life remains a movie: loaded with state-of-the-industry pyrotechnics, bristling with guns, and littered with synergistic product tie-ins", which makes the album "in directorial terms, a one-for-me situation: a passion project secured with almost a decade at the summit of pop rap as collateral". Riff Magazine wrote that Austin was "influenced by '80s and '90s alternative rock," which tended to "slow down the middle of the album."

== Commercial performance ==
In the United States, Austin debuted at number two on Billboard 200 chart, earning 113,000 album-equivalent units (including 34,000 in pure album sales) in its first week. This became Malone's fifth top-five album on the chart after all his previous studio albums reached the top five. The album also accumulated a total of 101.14 million on-demand streams of the album's songs.

== Track listing ==
All tracks produced by Post Malone, Andrew Watt, and Louis Bell, except where noted.

Austin track listing
No.	Title	Writer(s)	Length
1.	"Don't Understand"	Austin Post; Andrew Wotman; Louis Bell	3:03
2.	"Something Real"	Post; Wotman; Bell; Billy Walsh	3:25
3.	"Chemical"	Post; Wotman; Bell; Walsh	3:04
4.	"Novacandy"	Post; Wotman; Bell; Walsh	3:17
5.	"Mourning"	Post; Wotman; Bell	2:28
6.	"Too Cool to Die"	Post; Wotman; Bell; Walsh	3:25
7.	"Sign Me Up" (producers: Post Malone, Bell, Max Martin, Rami Yacoub)	Post; Bell; Martin; Yacoub; Walsh	3:19
8.	"Socialite"	Post; Wotman; Bell; Walsh	3:20
9.	"Overdrive"	Post; Wotman; Bell; Walsh	2:28
10.	"Speedometer"	Post; Wotman; Bell	2:42
11.	"Hold My Breath"	Post; Wotman; Bell	3:29
12.	"Enough Is Enough" (producers: Post Malone, Bell, Martin, Yacoub)	Post; Bell; Martin; Yacoub; Walsh	2:45
13.	"Texas Tea" (producers: Post Malone, Bell, Yacoub)	Post; Bell; Yacoub; Walsh	2:20
14.	"Buyer Beware"	Post; Wotman; Bell	2:53
15.	"Landmine"	Post; Wotman; Bell	3:05
16.	"Green Thumb"	Post; Wotman; Bell	2:39
17.	"Laugh It Off"	Post; Wotman; Bell	4:06
Total length:			51:27

Bonus track
No.	Title	Writer(s)	Length
18.	"Joy"	Post; Wotman; Bell	4:47
Total length:			56:14

== Personnel ==
Musicians

- Post Malone – vocals, guitar (all tracks); drums (tracks 3, 7, 12, 15), tambourine (3), programming (4, 6), drum programming (5), piano (8, 15), bass guitar (12)
- Louis Bell – programming (all tracks), piano (1–6, 8–11, 14, 15, 17, 18), drum programming (2, 3, 5–10, 12–15, 17, 18), bass programming (2, 4–10, 12–14, 17, 18), keyboards (2–10, 12–14, 17, 18)
- Andrew Watt – guitar (1–6, 8–11, 14–17), bass guitar (1, 3, 6, 8–11, 14, 17, 18), drums (2–4, 6, 8–11, 14, 17, 18), keyboards (3), programming (4, 17, 18), piano (10)
- David Campbell – string arrangement (1, 9, 11), conductor (11)
- Paula Hochhalter – violin (1), cello (9, 11)
- Josefina Vergara – violin (1)
- Tammy Hatwan – violin (1)
- Mick Jagger – maracas (3)
- Max Martin – guitar, piano (7, 12); bass guitar (7), keyboards (12)
- Rami Yacoub – bass guitar (7), guitar (13)
- Jacob Braun – cello (9, 11)
- Rodney Wirtz – viola (9, 11)
- Linnea Powell – viola (9, 11)
- Luke Maurer – viola (9, 11)
- Songa Lee – violin (9, 11)
- Sara Parkins – violin (9, 11)
- Philip Vaiman – violin (9, 11)
- Neil Samples – violin (9, 11)
- Michele Richards – violin (9, 11)
- Joel Pargman – violin (9, 11)
- Mario De Leon – violin (9, 11)
- Charlie Bisharat – violin (9, 11)

Technical

- Mike Bozzi – mastering
- Mark "Spike" Stent – mixing
- Marco Sonzini – engineering (1–4, 6, 8–11, 14–18)
- Paul Lamalfa – engineering (1–4, 6, 8–11, 14–18)
- Louis Bell – engineering (4, 5, 7, 12, 13, 15)
- Jed Jones – engineering (13, 15), engineering assistance (2, 3, 6, 8, 9)
- Joe Dougherty – engineering assistance (1, 2, 10, 11, 14, 16, 17, 18)
- Braden Bursteen – engineering assistance (2, 4, 15)
- Tommy Turner – engineering assistance (2, 4, 15)
- Kelsey Porter – engineering assistance (14, 17, 18)
- Marc VanGool – guitar technician, studio technician

== Charts ==
=== Weekly charts ===
Weekly chart performance for Austin
Chart (2023)	Peak position
Australian Albums (ARIA)	2
Australian Hip Hop/R&B Albums (ARIA)	2
Austrian Albums (Ö3 Austria)	3
Belgian Albums (Ultratop Flanders)	5
Belgian Albums (Ultratop Wallonia)	7
Canadian Albums (Billboard)	4
Danish Albums (Hitlisten)	3
Dutch Albums (Album Top 100)	2
Finnish Albums (Suomen virallinen lista)	10
French Albums (SNEP)	10
German Albums (Offizielle Top 100)	4
Hungarian Albums (MAHASZ)	16
Icelandic Albums (Tónlistinn)	4
Irish Albums (Official Charts)	2
Italian Albums (FIMI)	8
Japanese Digital Albums (Oricon)	22
Japanese Hot Albums (Billboard Japan)	63
Lithuanian Albums (AGATA)	11
New Zealand Albums (RMNZ)	3
Norwegian Albums (VG-lista)	2
Polish Albums (ZPAV)	16
Portuguese Albums (AFP)	7
Scottish Albums (Official Charts)	7
Spanish Albums (Promusicae)	18
Swedish Albums (Sverigetopplistan)	3
Swiss Albums (Schweizer Hitparade)	2
UK Albums (Official Charts)	3
US Billboard 200	2
US Top Alternative Albums (Billboard)	1

=== Year-end charts ===
Year-end chart performance for Austin
Chart (2023)	Position
Australian Albums (ARIA)	100
US Billboard 200	158

== Certifications ==
Certifications for Austin
Region	Certification	Certified units/sales
Netherlands (NVPI)	Gold	18,600^{‡}
New Zealand (RMNZ)	Gold	7,500^{‡}
United Kingdom (BPI)	Silver	60,000^{‡}
^{‡} Sales+streaming figures based on certification alone.
