= Coachella 2025 =

Music festival in California, U.S.

- Lineup poster
- Dates: Weekend 1: April 11, 2025–April 13, 2025; Weekend 2: April 18, 2025–April 20, 2025
- Locations: Empire Polo Club, Indio, California, United States
- Previous event: Coachella 2024
- Next event: Coachella 2026
- Website: coachella.com

Coachella 2025 was a music and arts festival that took place at the Empire Polo Club in Indio, California on April 11–13 and April 18–20, 2025. It is the 24th edition of the festival. The headlining performers were Lady Gaga, Green Day, Post Malone, and Travis Scott. The festival spanned two weekends, featuring a mix of rock, pop, hip-hop, electronic, and indie artists.

== Background ==
The Coachella Valley Music and Arts Festival, sometimes referred to as "Coachella Festival" or simply "Coachella," is held annually at the Empire Polo Club in Indio, United States. Founded by Paul Tollett and Rick Van Santen in 1999, the event features musical artists from many genres of music, including rock, pop, indie, hip hop and electronic dance music, as well as art installations and sculptures.

== Lineup ==
Post Malone was widely reported to be the Coachella Sunday headliner on November 19, 2024 when the announced dates for his Big Ass Stadium Tour included two shows in Indio, California that coincided with the previously confirmed dates for the festival. Though no official confirmation was initially made that Post Malone would be headlining, Coachella subsequently released the initial wave of performers the following day on November 20, two months earlier than their usual announcement date, which included Malone atop the bill on Sunday. The other two headliners, Lady Gaga on the Friday and Green Day on the Saturday, were also revealed on the poster. While originally not being attached to a specific day, Travis Scott was given a special performance slot and has been subsequently referred to as one of the headliners of the festival. Lady Gaga is the only return headliner, having previous topped the bill at the 2017 festival and is only the second woman to headline Coachella twice, following Björk, who performed in 2002 and 2007. Scott was announced to headliner the 2020 edition of the festival which was cancelled due to the COVID-19 pandemic. The lineup also includes a set by the Go-Go's, the band's first performance together since their disbandment in 2022. The Los Angeles Philharmonic, conducted by Gustavo Dudamel, made history when they became the first classical orchestra to perform at Coachella. Both Anitta and FKA Twigs were announced on the lineup, but cancelled for various reasons.

=== Coachella Stage ===
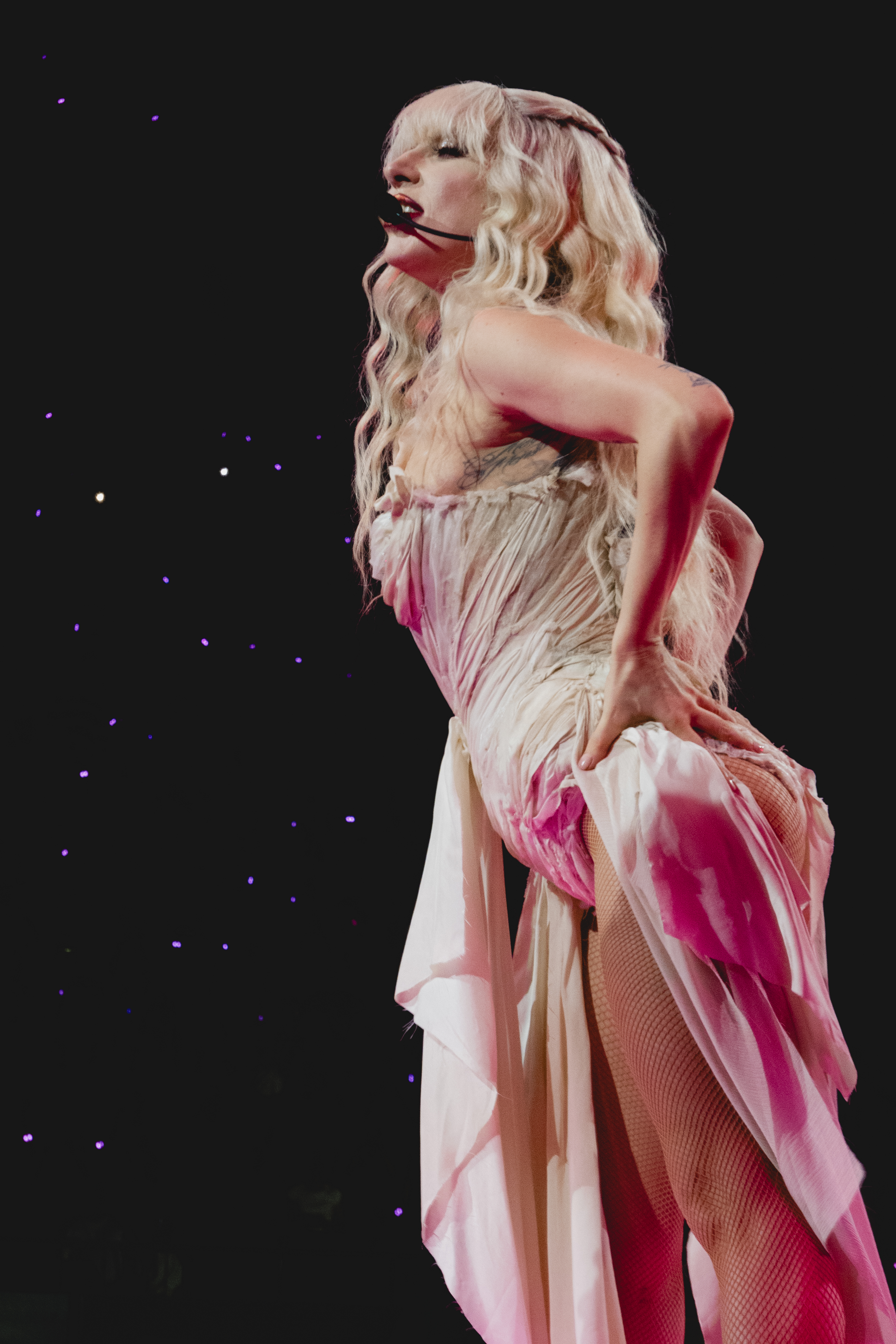
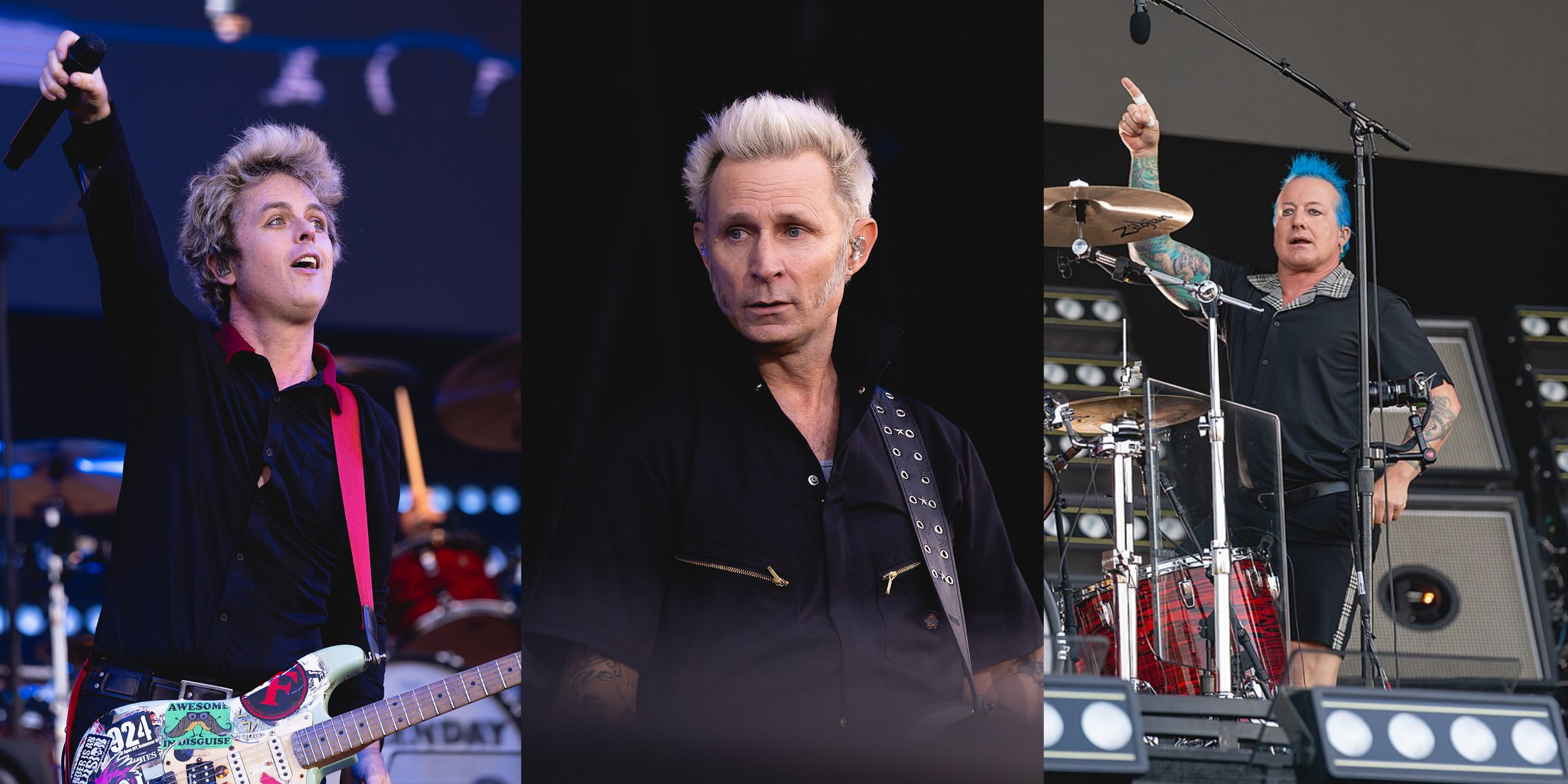
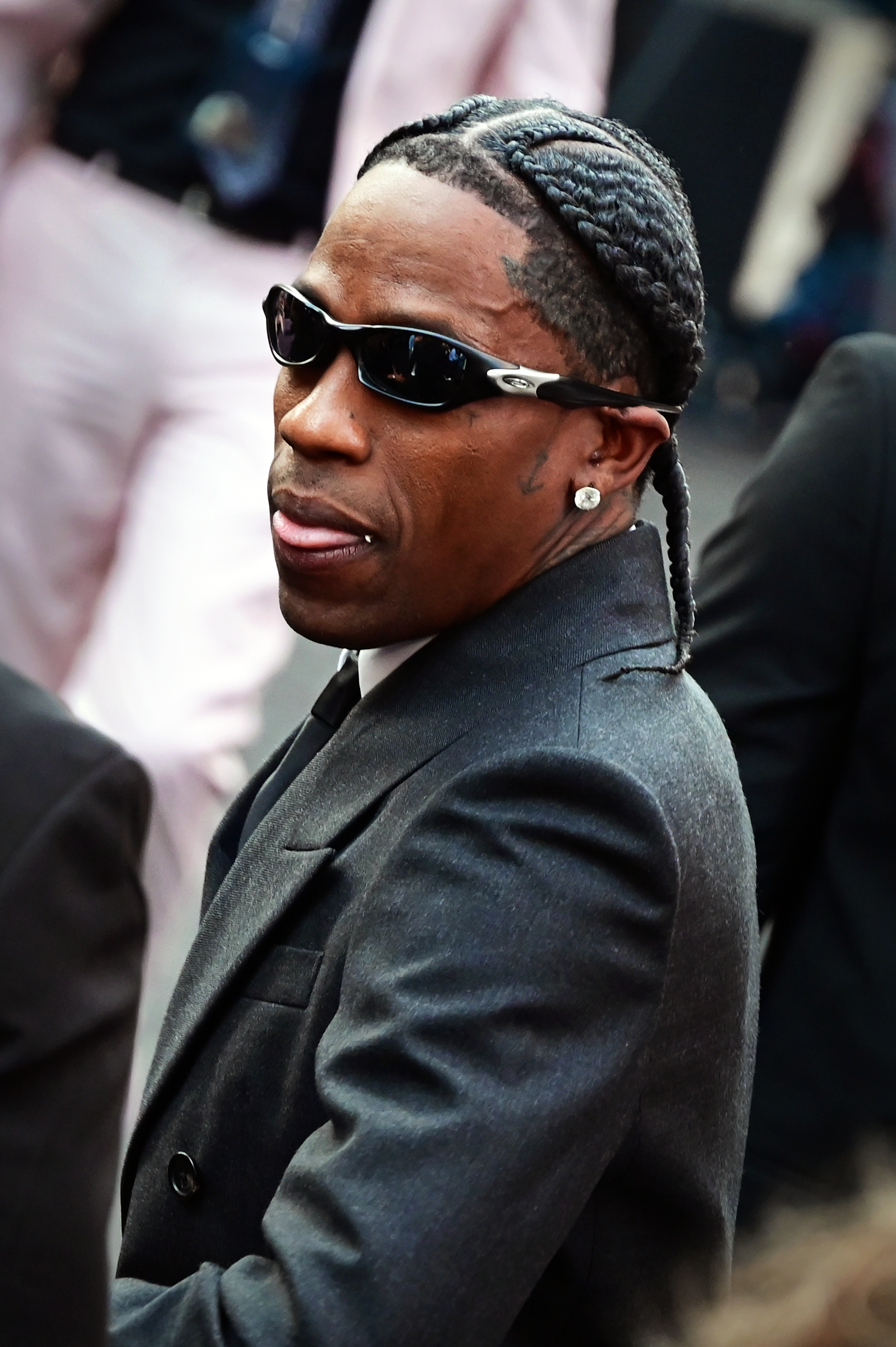
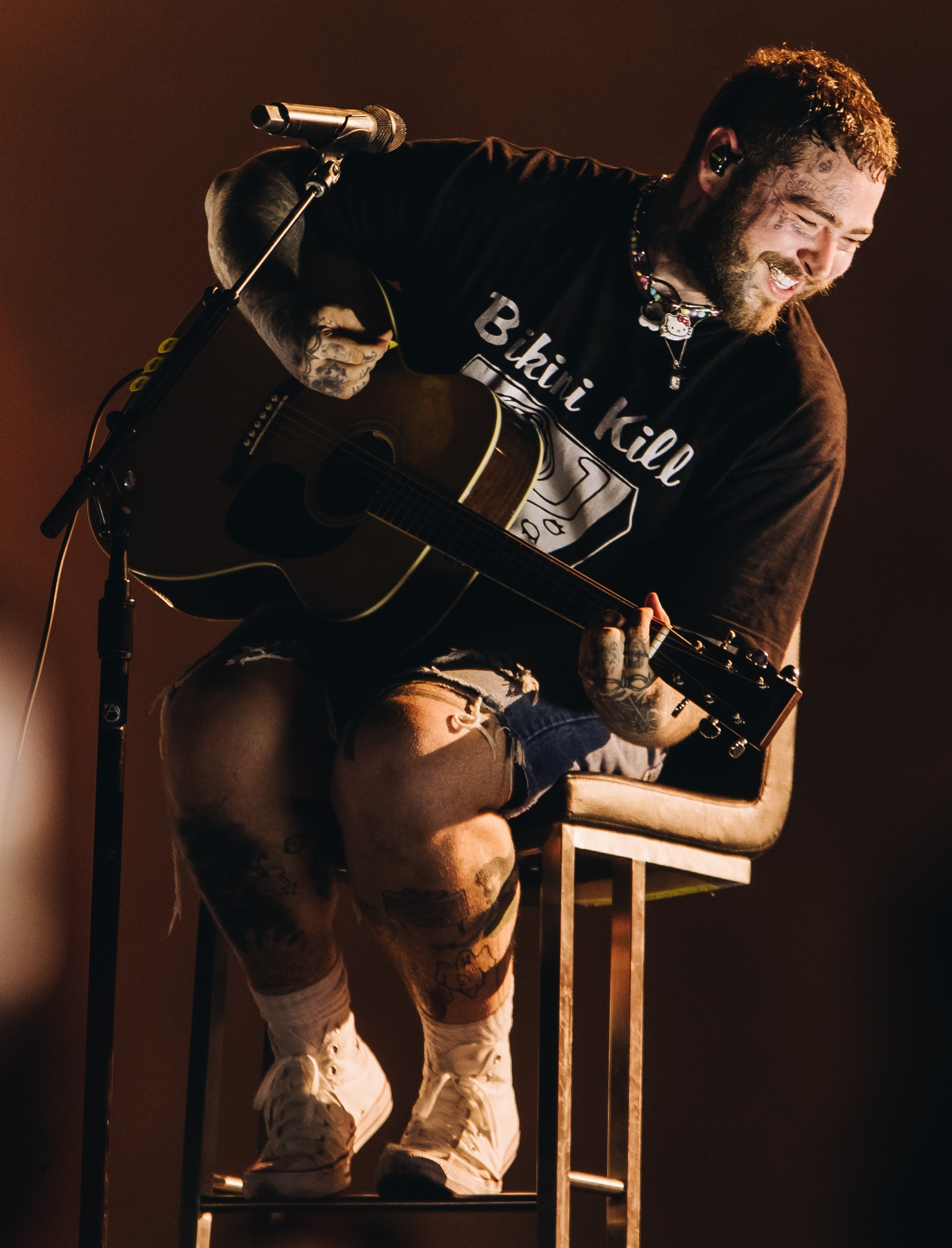
Coachella headliners Lady Gaga, Green Day, Travis Scott, and Post Malone

Friday	Saturday	Sunday
Lady Gaga^{[A]}; Missy Elliott; Benson Boone^{[B]}; Marina Diamandis; Thee Sacred Souls; Gabe Real	Travis Scott; Green Day; Charli XCX^{[C]}; T-Pain; Jimmy Eat World; Skrause	Post Malone^{[D]}; Megan Thee Stallion^{[E]}; Junior H^{[F]}; Beabadoobee; Shaboozey^{[G]}; Jaqck Glam

A. Lady Gaga's set featured a guest appearance from Gesaffelstein during the first weekend.
B. Benson Boone's set featured a guest appearance from Brian May during the first weekend.
C. Charli XCX's set featured guest appearances from Troye Sivan, Lorde, and Billie Eilish during the first weekend, and Addison Rae during the second weekend.
D. Post Malone's set featured guest appearances from Jelly Roll and Ed Sheeran during the second weekend.
E. Megan Thee Stallion's set featured guest appearances from Courtney LaPlante of Spiritbox during the first weekend, and Queen Latifah, Victoria Monét and Ciara during both weekends.
F. Junior H's set featured guest appearances from Tito Double P and Peso Pluma during the first weekend, and Peso Pluma during the second weekend.
G. Shaboozey's set featured a guest appearance from Noah Cyrus during the first weekend.

==== Headline sets ====
Lady Gaga
1. "Bloody Mary"
2. "Abracadabra”
3. "Judas"
4. "Scheiße"
5. "Garden of Eden"
6. "Poker Face"
7. "Perfect Celebrity"
8. "Disease"
9. "Paparazzi"
10. "Alejandro"
11. "The Beast"
12. "Killah"
13. "Zombieboy"
14. "Die with a Smile"
15. "How Bad Do U Want Me"
16. "Shadow of a Man" (with elements of "Kill for Love")
17. "Born This Way"
18. "Shallow"
19. "Vanish into You"
20. "Bad Romance"
Green Day
1. "American Idiot"
2. "Holiday"
3. "Know Your Enemy"
4. "Boulevard of Broken Dreams"
5. "One Eyed Bastard"
6. "Longview"
7. "Welcome to Paradise"
8. "Hitchin' a Ride"
9. "Brain Stew"
10. "St. Jimmy"
11. "21 Guns"
12. "Minority"
13. "Basket Case"
14. "When I Come Around"
15. "Wake Me Up When September Ends"
16. "Jesus of Suburbia"
17. "Bobby Sox"
18. "Good Riddance (Time of Your Life)"
Travis Scott
1. "Crush"
2. "Aye"
3. "Kick Out" (unreleased at the time)
4. "Dumb" (unreleased at the time)
5. "Backrooms"
6. "Type Shit"
7. "Nightcrawler"
8. "Mamacita"
9. "Hyaena"
10. "Thank God"
11. "Modern Jam"
12. "Praise God"
13. "Butterfly Effect"
14. "Sirens"
15. "Skyfall"
16. "Highest in the Room"
17. "Upper Echelon"
18. "Stargazing"
19. "My Eyes"
20. "Skeletons"
21. "90210"
22. "I Know ?"
23. "No Bystanders"
24. "Fein"
25. "Sicko Mode"
26. "Antidote"
27. "Goosebumps"
28. "Telekinesis"
Post Malone
1. "Texas Tea"
2. "Wow"
3. "Better Now"
4. "Lemon Tree"
5. "Wrong Ones"
6. "Go Flex"
7. "I Fall Apart"
8. "Losers"
9. "Goodbyes"
10. "M-E-X-I-C-O"
11. "What Don't Belong to Me"
12. "Circles"
13. "White Iverson"
14. "Psycho"
15. "Dead at the Honky Tonk"
16. "Rockstar"
17. "I Had Some Help"
18. "Congratulations"
19. "Sunflower"

=== Outdoor Theatre ===
Friday	Saturday	Sunday
Parcels; The Marías; Tyla^{[A]}; The Go-Go's^{[B]}; Seun Kuti & Egypt 80; Tiffany Tyson	The Original Misfits; Above & Beyond; Clairo^{[C]}; Gustavo Dudamel & Los Angeles Philharmonic^{[D]}; Japanese Breakfast^{[E]}; Tink; Megatone	Polo & Pan; Zedd^{[F]}; Jennie^{[G]}; Still Woozy; Keshi; Meute

A. Tyla's set featured a guest appearance from Becky G during the first weekend, and WizTheMc during the second weekend.
B. The Go-Go's set featured a guest appearance from Billie Joe Armstrong during the first weekend.
C. Clairo's set was introduced by Bernie Sanders and featured a guest appearance from Claud during weekend one.
D. Gustavo Dudamel and the LA Philharmonic's set featured guest appearances from Laufey, Maren Morris, Becky G, Ca7riel & Paco Amoroso, Zedd, and LL Cool J during weekend one, and Laufey, Natasha Bedingfield, Ca7riel & Paco Amoroso, Dave Grohl, and Cynthia Erivo during weekend two.
E. Japanese Breakfast's set featured a guest appearance from Ginger Root during weekend one.
F. Zedd's set featured guest appearances from Bea Miller, Elley Duhé, Maren Morris, The Ollam, John Mayer, and Julia Michaels during the first weekend, and Bea Miller, Incubus, Alessia Cara, and LA Philharmonic during the second weekend.
G. Jennie's set featured a guest appearance from Kali Uchis during the first weekend.

=== Sonora Tent ===
Friday	Saturday	Sunday
HiTech; Speed; Los Mirlos; Kneecap; Julie; Tops; Vs Self; Glixen; Doom Dave	El Malilla; Vtss; Blonde Redhead; Underscores^{[A]}; Judeline; Together Pangea; Prison Affair; Triste Juventud x TÓTEM	Snow Strippers; Ginger Root; Circle Jerks; Soft Play; Wisp; Bob Vylan; Kumo 99; Sin Rastro

A. Underscores' set featured a guest appearance from Danny Brown.

B. Kneecap's set featured a guest appearance from Hasan Piker during weekend two.

=== Gobi Tent ===
Friday	Saturday	Sunday
Indo Warehouse; Ca7riel & Paco Amoroso; Artemas; A. G. Cook^{[A]}; D4vd; 4Batz; Maribou State; Parisi; Saison	Rawayana^{[B]}; Beth Gibbons; Darkside; 2hollis; Viagra Boys; Glass Beams; Medium Build; Elusive	Amyl and the Sniffers; Arca^{[C]}; BigXthaPlug; Mohamed Ramadan; Amaarae; The Beaches; Hope Tala; WaveGroove

A. A. G. Cook's set featured a guest appearance from Danny Brown during weekend one, and Kesha during weekend two.
B. Rawayana's set featured guest appearances from Bebo Dumont, Rafa Pabön, Danny Ocean, and Akapellah during weekend one.
C. Arca's set featured guest appearances from Tokischa and Addison Rae during weekend one, and Hikaru Utada during weekend two.

=== Mojave Tent ===
Friday	Saturday	Sunday
The Prodigy; Miike Snow; Eyedress; Djo; Lola Young; Saint Jhn; Ravyn Lenae; Sincerely, Manolo	The Dare; Ed Sheeran^{[A]}; HorsegiirL; Hanumankind; Iván Cornejo^{[B]}; Sam Fender^{[C]}; Yo Gabba Gabba!^{[D]}; Weezer; Record Safari	Kraftwerk; Basement Jaxx; Rema; Jessie Murph; Muni Long; Fcukers; Pennywild

A. Ed Sheeran performed for the first time at Coachella and only during weekend two.
B. Iván Cornejo's set featured a guest appearance from Cigarettes After Sex during weekend one.
C. Sam Fender's set featured a guest appearance from Adam Granduciel during weekend two.
D. Yo Gabba Gabba!'s set featured guest appearances from Flavor Flav, DJ Lance Rock, Thundercat, "Weird Al" Yankovic, Paul Williams, and Portugal. The Man. Alongside appearances from characters including Domo, Bozo the Clown, The Teletubbies, and Billy Bob of The Rock-afire Explosion.

=== Sahara Tent ===
Friday	Saturday	Sunday
Mustard^{[A]}; GloRilla; Yeat; Lisa; Sara Landry; Three 6 Mafia; Chris Lorenzo; Austin Millz; Massio	Keinemusik; Mau P; Enhypen; Shoreline Mafia; Disco Lines; Alok^{[B]}; Salute; Talón	XG; Ty Dolla Sign^{[C]}; Chase & Status; Boris Brejcha; Sammy Virji; Ben Böhmer; Interplanetary Criminal; Tom Breu

A. Mustard's set featured guest appearances from Tyga, 2 Chainz, YG, Big Sean, Roddy Ricch, and Ella Mai
B. Alok's set featured a guest appearance from Ava Max.
C. Ty Dolla Sign's set featured guest appearances from YG, Blxst, Tyga, D-Loc, Roddy Ricch, Leon Thomas, and Wiz Khalifa during weekend one, and Freddie Gibbs, D-Loc, Feid, Leon Thomas, and George Clinton during weekend two.

=== Yuma Tent ===
Friday	Saturday	Sunday
Vintage Culture; Chris Stussy; Pete Tong b2b Ahmed Spins; Tinlicker; Beltran; Damian Lazarus; Shermanology; Moon Boots; Coco & Breezy; Erez	Eli Brown; Amelie Lens; Mind Against b2b Massano; Infected Mushroom; Indira Paganotto; Klangkuenstler; Layton Giordani; DJ Gigola; HAAi	Dixon b2b Jimi Jules; Francis Mercier; Dennis Cruz; Sparrow & Barbossa; Tripolism; Desiree; AMÉMÉ; Yulia Niko

=== Quasar Stage ===
Friday	Saturday	Sunday
The Martinez Brothers x Loco Dice; Coco & Breezy x Kaleena Zanders	Barry Can't Swim x 2manydjs x Salute; Fcukers x HAAi	Tiësto; Odd Mob

== See also ==
- Mayhem promotional concerts
