= Big Ass Stadium Tour =

2025–2026 concert tour by Post Malone

- Tour by Post Malone
- Promotional poster
- Location: Asia; Europe; North America; Oceania
- Associated album: F-1 Trillion
- Start date: April 29, 2025
- End date: October 24, 2026
- Legs: 3
- No. of shows: 80
- Supporting acts: Jelly Roll; Sierra Ferrell; Wyatt Flores; Chandler Walters
- Attendance: 1.06 million
- Box office: $169,711,711

Post Malone concert chronology
- F-1 Trillion Tour (2024); Big Ass Stadium Tour (2025–2026)

The Big Ass Stadium Tour was the eighth concert tour by American musician Post Malone, in support of his sixth studio album, F-1 Trillion (2024). The tour's first leg began in Salt Lake City on April 29, 2025, and concluded in London on September 21. Its second leg, subtitled Big Ass Stadium Tour Part 2, began in Fort Lauderdale on April 10, 2026, and concluded in Austin on October 24.

== Background ==
On November 19, 2024, Post Malone announced his eighth headlining concert tour, and his first all-stadium tour. Jelly Roll and Sierra Ferrell were also announced as the tour's primary opening acts. Tickets went on sale on November 26, with various presales that ran from November 20 to November 25.

On February 17, 2025, Post Malone announced the European leg of the tour, which consisted of festival appearances alongside headlining stadium concerts, with Jelly Roll joining as the opening act on most dates. Tickets went on general sale four days later. On May 8, extra dates in London and Berlin were added. On September 5, the London shows were rescheduled from September 7 and September 8 to September 20 and September 21, respectively, due to the London Underground strikes.

On May 5, 2026, the show in Tampa was rescheduled and five other American dates were cancelled, with Malone citing scheduling conflicts. On August 28, 2026, Post Malone postponed all Asian, Australian and New Zealand dates indefinitely without explanation, offering refunds.

== Set list ==
This set list is representative of the show in Salt Lake City on April 29, 2025. It is not representative of all concerts for the duration of the tour.

1. "Texas Tea"
2. "Wow"
3. "Better Now"
4. "Lemon Tree"
5. "Wrong Ones"
6. "Go Flex"
7. "Hollywood's Bleeding"
8. "I Fall Apart"
9. "Losers" (with Jelly Roll)
10. "Goodbyes"
11. "M-E-X-I-C-O"
12. "What Don't Belong to Me"
13. "Feeling Whitney"
14. "Never Love You Again"
15. "Circles"
16. "White Iverson"
17. "Psycho"
18. "Finer Things"
19. "Pour Me a Drink"
20. "Dead at the Honky Tonk"
21. "Rockstar"
22. "I Had Some Help"
23. "Sunflower"
24. "Congratulations"

=== Notes ===
- On both the September 20 and September 21 shows in London, Post Malone performed "Broken Whiskey Glass", "Take What You Want", "Stay", and "I Ain't Comin' Back". "M-E-X-I-C-O", "Never Love You Again", "Finer Things", and "Pour Me a Drink" were removed from the setlist.

== Tour dates ==
List of 2025 concerts
Date (2025)	City	Country	Venue	Opening act(s)	Attendance	Revenue
April 29	Salt Lake City	United States	Rice–Eccles Stadium	Jelly Roll; Sierra Ferrell	40,551 / 40,551	$6,204,677
May 3	Paradise (Note: Promoted as Las Vegas.)	United States	Allegiant Stadium	Jelly Roll; Sierra Ferrell	52,890 / 52,890	$9,310,455
May 7	San Antonio	United States	Alamodome	Jelly Roll; Sierra Ferrell	43,347 / 43,347	$5,741,964
May 9	Arlington	United States	AT&T Stadium	Jelly Roll; Sierra Ferrell	52,702 / 52,702	$9,524,853
May 11	Atlanta	United States	Mercedes-Benz Stadium	Jelly Roll; Sierra Ferrell	42,400 / 42,400	$5,501,373
May 13	St. Louis	United States	Busch Stadium	Jelly Roll; Sierra Ferrell	40,854 / 40,854	$6,371,038
May 16 (Note: This show is part of the Sand In My Boots Festival.)	Gulf Shores	United States	Gulf Shores Beach	—N/a	—N/a	—N/a
May 18	Detroit	United States	Ford Field	Jelly Roll; Sierra Ferrell	47,917 / 47,917	$8,775,771
May 20	Minneapolis	United States	U.S. Bank Stadium	Jelly Roll; Sierra Ferrell	47,803 / 47,803	$7,665,363
May 22	Chicago	United States	Wrigley Field	Jelly Roll; Sierra Ferrell	39,207 / 39,207	$8,060,930
May 24	Philadelphia	United States	Citizens Bank Park	Jelly Roll; Chandler Walters	42,222 / 42,222	$7,237,459
May 26	Toronto	Canada	Rogers Centre	Jelly Roll; Chandler Walters	38,285 / 38,285	$7,041,410
May 28	Hershey	United States	Hersheypark Stadium	Jelly Roll; Sierra Ferrell	29,630 / 29,630	$4,852,504
May 29	Pittsburgh	United States	PNC Park	Jelly Roll; Sierra Ferrell	39,641 / 39,641	$6,231,078
May 31	Foxborough	United States	Gillette Stadium	Jelly Roll	51,782 / 51,782	$10,819,615
June 2	Landover (Note: Promoted as Washington, D.C.)	United States	Northwest Stadium	Jelly Roll	29,081 / 29,081	$3,335,847
June 4	New York City	United States	Citi Field	Jelly Roll; Wyatt Flores; Chandler Walters	35,585 / 35,585	$5,871,210
June 8	Miami Gardens (Note: Promoted as Miami.)	United States	Hard Rock Stadium	Jelly Roll; Wyatt Flores	32,939 / 32,939	$3,548,320
June 10	Orlando	United States	Camping World Stadium	Jelly Roll; Wyatt Flores	38,819 / 38,819	$6,137,940
June 13	Ridgedale	United States	Thunder Ridge Nature Arena	Jelly Roll; Wyatt Flores	19,739 / 19,739	$2,651,625
June 15	Denver	United States	Empower Field at Mile High	Jelly Roll; Wyatt Flores	55,639 / 55,639	$8,527,843
June 19	Inglewood (Note: Promoted as Los Angeles.)	United States	SoFi Stadium	Jelly Roll; Wyatt Flores; Chandler Walters	45,458 / 45,458	$4,825,988
June 21	Glendale	United States	State Farm Stadium	Wyatt Flores; Chandler Walters	50,365 / 50,365	$6,194,580
June 24	Boise	United States	Albertsons Stadium	Jelly Roll; Wyatt Flores	36,578 / 36,578	$6,548,569
June 26	Seattle	United States	T-Mobile Park	Jelly Roll; Wyatt Flores	41,648 / 41,648	$7,310,461
June 28	Portland	United States	Providence Park	Jelly Roll; Wyatt Flores	31,125 / 31,125	$5,333,378
July 1	San Francisco	United States	Oracle Park	Jelly Roll	34,895 / 34,895	$6,087,460
August 8 (Note: This show is part of Untold Festival.)	Cluj-Napoca	Romania	Cluj Arena	—N/a	—N/a	—N/a
August 10 (Note: This show is part of Sziget Festival.)	Budapest	Hungary	Óbudai-sziget	—N/a	—N/a	—N/a
August 12	Prague	Czech Republic	Letňany	—N/a	—	—
August 13 (Note: This show is part of Frequency Festival.)	St. Pölten	Austria	Green Park	—N/a	—N/a	—N/a
August 15 (Note: This show is part of Bittersweet Festival.)	Poznań	Poland	Citadel Park	—N/a	—N/a	—N/a
August 16 (Note: This show is part of Lovestream Festival.)	Bratislava	Slovakia	Vajnory Airport	—N/a	—N/a	—N/a
August 18	Berlin	Germany	Parkbühne Wuhlheide	Jelly Roll	—	—
August 19	Berlin	Germany	Parkbühne Wuhlheide	Jelly Roll	—	—
August 21	Kaunas	Lithuania	Darius and Girėnas Stadium	Justinas Jarutis	—	—
August 23	Horsens	Denmark	Nordstern Arena	—N/a	—	—
August 27 (Note: This show is part of I-Days Festival.)	Milan	Italy	Hippodrome of San Siro	—N/a	—N/a	—N/a
August 29 (Note: This show is part of Zürich Openair.)	Zürich	Switzerland	Festivalgelände Glattbrugg	—N/a	—N/a	—N/a
August 30 (Note: This show is part of Superbloom Festival.)	Munich	Germany	Olympiapark	—N/a	—N/a	—N/a
September 3	Nanterre (Note: Promoted as Paris.)	France	Paris La Défense Arena	Jelly Roll	—	—
September 5	Hanover	Germany	Heinz-von-Heiden-Arena	Jelly Roll	—	—
September 9	Arnhem	Netherlands	GelreDome	Jelly Roll	—	—
September 12	Barcelona	Spain	Estadi Olímpic Lluís Companys	Jelly Roll	—	—
September 14	Lisbon	Portugal	Estádio do Restelo	Jelly Roll	—	—
September 20 (Note: Rescheduled from September 7 and 8, 2025, due to the London Underground strikes.)	London	England	Tottenham Hotspur Stadium	Jelly Roll	—	—
September 21	London	England	Tottenham Hotspur Stadium	Jelly Roll	—	—

List of 2026 concerts
Date (2026)	City	Country	Venue	Opening act(s)	Attendance	Revenue
April 10 (Note: This show is part of Tortuga Music Festival.)	Fort Lauderdale	United States	Lauderdale Beach Park	—N/a	—N/a	—N/a
April 26 (Note: This show is part of Stagecoach Festival.)	Indio	United States	Empire Polo Club	—N/a	—N/a	—N/a
May 16 (Note: This show is part of Boots in the Park Albuquerque.)	Albuquerque	United States	Balloon Fiesta Park	—N/a	—N/a	—N/a
May 31 (Note: This show is part of Gulf Coast Jam.)	Panama City Beach	United States	Frank Brown Park	—N/a	—N/a	—N/a
June 7 (Note: This show is part of Carolina Country Music Fest.)	Myrtle Beach	United States	Burroughs & Chapin Pavilion Place	—N/a	—N/a	—N/a
June 9	Charlotte	United States	Bank of America Stadium	Jelly Roll; Carter Faith	—	—
June 12	Indianapolis	United States	Lucas Oil Stadium	Jelly Roll; Carter Faith	—	—
June 16	Toronto	Canada	Rogers Stadium	Jelly Roll; Carter Faith	—	—
June 20 (Note: This show is part of Barefoot Music Festival.)	Wildwood	United States	Wildwood Beach	—N/a	—N/a	—N/a
June 22	East Hartford	United States	Pratt & Whitney Stadium at Rentschler Field	Jelly Roll; Carter Faith	—	—
June 25	Cleveland	United States	Huntington Bank Field	Jelly Roll; Carter Faith	—	—
June 27 (Note: This show is part of Summerfest.)	Milwaukee	United States	American Family Insurance Amphitheater	Carter Faith	—N/a	—N/a
June 30	Nashville	United States	Nissan Stadium	BigXthaPlug; Carter Faith	—	—
July 2	Columbus	United States	Historic Crew Stadium	HARDY	—	—
July 8 (Note: Rescheduled from May 29, 2026, due to scheduling conflicts.)	Tampa	United States	Raymond James Stadium	Jelly Roll; Carter Faith	—	—
July 11	Fayetteville	United States	Donald W. Reynolds Razorback Stadium	Jelly Roll; Carter Faith	—	—
July 15	Kansas City	United States	Kauffman Stadium	Jelly Roll; Carter Faith	—	—
July 17	Ames	United States	Jack Trice Stadium	Jelly Roll; Carter Faith	—	—
July 21	Missoula	United States	Washington-Grizzly Stadium	Jelly Roll; Carter Faith	—	—
July 24	Edmonton	Canada	Commonwealth Stadium	Jelly Roll; Carter Faith	—	—
July 28	Salt Lake City	United States	Rice-Eccles Stadium	Jelly Roll; Carter Faith	—	—
August 29 (Note: This show is part of YQM Country Fest.)	Dieppe	Canada	Site MusiquArt Site	—N/a	—N/a	—N/a
October 24 (Note: This show is set to be part of the 2026 United States Grand Prix.)	Austin	United States	Circut of the Americas	—N/a	—N/a	—N/a
Total

=== Postponed shows ===
Date (2026)	City	Country	Venue	Opening act(s)
September 16	Hong Kong		Kai Tak Stadium	Don Toliver
September 19	Kaohsiung	Taiwan	Kaohsiung National Stadium	Don Toliver
September 22	Bangkok	Thailand	Rajamangala Stadium	Don Toliver
September 25	Singapore		Singapore National Stadium	Don Toliver
September 27	Kuala Lumpur	Malaysia	TM National Stadium	Don Toliver
September 29	Bocaue (Note: Promoted as Manila.)	Philippines	Philippine Arena	Don Toliver
October 2	Goyang (Note: Promoted as Seoul.)	South Korea	Goyang Stadium	Don Toliver
October 6	Yokohama (Note: Promoted as Tokyo.)	Japan	K-Arena Yokohama	Don Toliver
October 9	Melbourne	Australia	Marvel Stadium	Don Toliver
October 10 (Note: This show is set to be part of the Strummingbird Festival.)	Ballarat (Note: Promoted as Newington)	Australia	Victoria Park	—N/a
October 12	Brisbane	Australia	Suncorp Stadium	Don Toliver
October 15	Sydney	Australia	ENGIE Stadium	Don Toliver
October 17	Newcastle (Note: Promoted as Newcastle East)	Australia	Foreshore Park	—N/a
October 18	Sunshine Coast (Note: Promoted as Bokarina)	Australia	Kawana Sports Precinct	—N/a
October 21	Auckland	New Zealand	Go Media Stadium	Don Toliver

== Cancelled dates ==
List of cancelled concerts
Date (2026)	City	Country	Venue	Reason
May 13	El Paso	United States	Sun Bowl	Scheduling conflicts
May 19	Waco	United States	McLane Stadium	Scheduling conflicts
May 23	Baton Rouge	United States	Tiger Stadium	Scheduling conflicts
May 26	Birmingham	United States	Protective Stadium	Scheduling conflicts
June 5	Oxford	United States	Vaught-Hemingway Stadium	Scheduling conflicts
July 25	Edmonton	Canada	Commonwealth Stadium	Weather
