= Post Malone Tribute to Nirvana =

Post Malone Tribute to Nirvana "Good Luck Mr. Malone"

Live album by Post Malone
- Released: April 12, 2025
- Recorded: April 24, 2020
- Genres: Grunge; alternative rock
- Length: 42:09
- Labels: Mercury; Republic
- Producer: Post Malone

Post Malone chronology
F-1 Trillion (2024)	Post Malone Tribute to Nirvana "Good Luck Mr. Malone" (2025)	Post Malone Live from NPR's Tiny Desk (2026)

Post Malone Tribute to Nirvana also referred to by its full title Post Malone Tribute to Nirvana "Good Luck Mr. Malone" is the first live album released by Post Malone. It features recordings from a livestreamed concert originally broadcast on his YouTube channel on April 24, 2020, during which he performed covers of songs by Nirvana. The live album was released exclusively on vinyl on April 12, 2025, as part of the Record Store Day.

== Background ==
In April 2020 during the height of the COVID-19 pandemic, Post Malone hosted a livestreamed tribute concert for Nirvana on his YouTube channel. The goal was to raise funds for coronavirus relief efforts. The concert happened at his home in Salt Lake City, Utah. He was joined by drummer Travis Barker, bassist Brian Lee and guitarist Nick Mack, and all four musicians wore flowery dresses to further pay tribute to Nirvana's frontman, Kurt Cobain. To follow social distancing rules each musician played from a room, in the house. Their performance brought in $500,000 for the COVID-19 Solidarity Response Fund. Google matched some of the donations helping to boost the total.

Post Malone admired Nirvana way before the tribute, since he already covered Nirvana's song "Lithium" during the Coachella in 2016. He also has the words "Stay Away", a reference to Nirvana's song of the same name, tattooed above his right eyebrow, as well as a portrait of Kurt Cobain on one of his fingers. Before organizing the livestream, he sought the approval of Kurt Cobain's daughter, Frances Bean Cobain, as well as his widow, Courtney Love. In a June 2022 interview with Howard Stern, Malone explained that Cobain had been a major musical inspiration to him and that he wanted to ensure that the tribute would not offend anyone.

== Reception ==
Courtney Love, widow of Kurt Cobain, expressed her enthusiasm for Malone's performance in a series of Instagram posts following the livestream. She praised the tribute, describing it as giving her "goosebumps", and congratulated Malone on the performance, adding that she had "nothing but love" for him. Nirvana bassist Krist Novoselic, praised the performance on social media, writing that Malone and his band were "on fire" and that he was proud of them. Meanwhile, Nirvana's drummer Dave Grohl described the performance as "really cool", adding that Malone seemed "perfectly comfortable" performing the band's songs.

== Track listing ==
All the tracks are produced by Post Malone.

All tracks are written by Kurt Cobain, except where noted.

Post Malone Tribute to Nirvana track listing
No.	Title	Writer(s)	Length
1.	"Drain You (live)"		3:17
2.	"Come As You Are (Live)"		3:19
3.	"Lounge Act (Live)"		2:26
4.	"School (Live)"		2:03
5.	"Heart Shaped Box (Live)"		4:57
6.	"Something In The Way (Live)"		3:03
7.	"About A Girl (Live)"		2:46
8.	"Stay Away (Live)"		2:41
9.	"Lithium (Live)"		3:43
10.	"Breed (Live)"		2:45
11.	"On A Plane (Live)"		3:00
12.	"Very Ape (Live)"		1:49
13.	"Territorial Pissings (Live)"	Cobain; Chet Powers	2:07
14.	"In Bloom (Live)"		4:13
Total length:			42:09

== Personnel ==
Musicians

- Post Malone – vocals, guitar (all tracks)
- Kurt Cobain – songwriting (all tracks)
- Chet Powers – songwriting (13)
- Brian Lee – guitar (all tracks), bass, violin
- Nick McMullen – guitar (all tracks), bass, background vocals
- Travis Barker – drums (all tracks)

Technical

- Trent Woodman – mixing and mastering (all tracks)
- Willie Linton – mixing and mastering (all tracks)
