= August 26th (mixtape) =

Mixtape by Post Malone

Mixtape by Post Malone
- Released: May 12, 2016
- Recorded: 2014–2016
- Length: 37:47
- Label: Republic
- Producers: FKi; Post Malone; Cashio; Charlie Handsome; Louis Bell; ILoveMakonnen; Rex Kudo

Post Malone chronology
| Y.A.T.R (2014) | August 26th (2016) | Stoney (2016) |

August 26th (also titled August 26 on streaming services) is the third mixtape and major label debut by American musician Post Malone. It was released on May 12, 2016, by Republic Records on DatPiff. The mixtape features guest appearances from Larry June, 2 Chainz, FKi 1st, Jeremih, Lil Yachty, Jaden Smith, and Teo.

For its tenth anniversary, the mixtape re-released onto streaming services on August 26, 2026.

== Background ==
The title was initially a reference to the release date of his debut studio album Stoney (2016), however, August 26, 2016, passed without its release. On August 27, 2016, Post Malone issued an apology for the delay of the release of his album, citing several problems, placing a blame on both himself and his team for failing to come through with the album. He concluded the letter by promising the release of the album would materialize soon later in the year. The album was eventually released on December 9, 2016.

The mixtape was produced by Post Malone with the help of Atlanta Rapper FKi 1st. In an interview, Post recalled how FKi showed him the ropes of music production and the music industry. The two built the vibe of the album around parties; most of the mixtape was produced while Post and FKi when there was "like 15–20 people in the studio." The album was completed while Post Malone was touring as an opening act for Justin Bieber in his Purpose World Tour.

The track "Money Made Me Do It" featuring 2 Chainz was included as a bonus track on the deluxe edition of Stoney.

== Critical reception ==
Initial reception of the mixtape was mixed. Pitchfork gave the mixtape a 5.2/10, calling Post's lyricism weak and repetitive, admiring when he embraces his punk and rock background, and ultimately describing the mixtape as "falling down an acoustic rap cover k-hole." XXL gave the mixtape a lukewarm review, and while they noted moments of quality in the project, ultimately said that the mixtape was a "warm up for his debut album... than an actual standalone mixtape".

== Track listing ==
August 26th track listing
| No. | Title | Writer(s) | Producer(s) | Length |
|---|---|---|---|---|
| 1. | "Never Understand" (featuring Larry June) | Austin Post; Leonard Hendricks III; Trocon Roberts | FKi 1st; Post Malone | 4:31 |
| 2. | "Money Made Me Do It" (featuring 2 Chainz) | Post; Tauheed Epps; Roberts | FKi 1st; Louis Bell^{[a]} | 3:50 |
| 3. | "Git wit U" | Post; Ben Bell; L. Bell | L. Bell | 2:24 |
| 4. | "God Damn" (featuring FKi 1st) | Post; Roberts; Ryan Vojtesak | FKi 1st; Charlie Handsome | 3:01 |
| 5. | "Fuck" (featuring Jeremih) | Post; Jeremy Felton; Roberts | FKi 1st | 3:34 |
| 6. | "40 Funk" | Post; Roberts; Makonnen Sheran | FKi 1st; iLoveMakonnen | 4:24 |
| 7. | "Monta" (featuring Lil Yachty) | Post; Idan Kalai | Cashio | 3:55 |
| 8. | "Hollywood Dreams / Comedown" | Post; L. Bell; Stevie Nicks; Roberts | FKi 1st; L. Bell | 5:02 |
| 9. | "Lonely..." (featuring Jaden and Téo) | Post; Mateo Arias; Roberts; Jaden Smith | FKi; Post Malone | 4:15 |
| 10. | "Oh God" | Post; Rex Kudo | Post Malone; Kudo | 2:51 |
| Total length: | | | | 37:47 |

=== Notes ===
- ^{^[a]} signifies an additional producer
- "Hollywood Dreams / Comedown" contains elements of "Dreams" (1977), written by Stevie Nicks and performed by Fleetwood Mac.

== Charts ==
Chart performance for August 26th
| Chart (2026) | Peak position |
|---|---|
| Australian Hip Hop/R&B Albums (ARIA) | 21 |
| Belgian Albums (Ultratop Flanders) | 79 |
| Danish Vinyl Albums (Hitlisten) | 23 |
| Dutch Albums (Album Top 100) | 32 |
| Scottish Albums (Official Charts) | 82 |
| UK Albums Sales (Official Charts) | 76 |
| UK R&B Albums (Official Charts) | 6 |
| US Billboard 200 | 135 |
| US Top R&B/Hip-Hop Albums (Billboard) | 41 |
