= Stoney (album) =

2016 studio album by Post Malone

- Standard cover

Studio album by Post Malone
- Released: December 9, 2016
- Recorded: 2015–2016
- Studios: Chalice (Hollywood); Electric Feel (Hollywood); Germano (New York City); Perfect Sound (Los Angeles); Serenity West (Los Angeles); Platinum Sound (New York City); The Gold House (Los Angeles); Kudo (Pacific Palisades); The Mekanics (West Palm Beach)
- Genre: Hip-hop
- Length: 50:40
- Label: Republic
- Producers: Louis Bell; Cashio; Frank Dukes; Rico Evans; FKi 1st; Foreign Teck; Charlie Handsome; Illangelo; Rex Kudo; Post Malone; Metro Boomin; Justin Mosely; Mustard; Roofeeo; Leon Thomas III; Pharrell Williams; Vinylz

Post Malone chronology
August 26th (2016)	Stoney (2016)	Beerbongs & Bentleys (2018)

Alternative cover
- Physical release cover

Singles from Stoney
- 1. "White Iverson" Released: February 4, 2015; 2. "Too Young" Released: October 9, 2015; 3. "Go Flex" Released: April 21, 2016; 4. "Deja Vu" Released: September 9, 2016; 5. "Congratulations" Released: January 31, 2017; 6. "I Fall Apart" Released: October 17, 2017

Stoney is the debut studio album by the American musician Post Malone, released on December 9, 2016, by Republic Records. After rising to prominence with his debut single "White Iverson" in 2015, Malone signed to Republic and began working on his debut album. His debut mixtape, August 26th, was released in May 2016. It was titled after the original planned release date for Stoney, though it was subsequently delayed. The album features guest appearances from Justin Bieber, Kehlani, and Quavo. Production was handled by a variety of record producers, including Malone himself, Louis Bell, Frank Dukes, FKi 1st, Charlie Handsome, Illangelo, Metro Boomin, Mustard, Roofeeo, Leon Thomas III, Pharrell Williams, and Vinylz, among others.

Stoney is primarily a hip-hop album that contains influences from country, pop, and R&B. Its lyrics generally revolve around money, luxury, drugs, and women, and its instrumentals feature heavy bass and trap snares reminiscent of club music. Malone aimed to create a unique sound in hip-hop, as he found much of the music in the genre was cliché. He incorporated his guitar-playing and influences from rock music with the goal of making an innovative sound. The album was promoted by six singles, including the three US Diamond-certified songs "White Iverson", "Congratulations", and "I Fall Apart". The Stoney Tour took place across the United States throughout September and October 2017.

Stoney received mixed reviews, with critics enjoying the hooks presented but finding its songwriting generic. The album received several award nominations, including Top Billboard 200 Album at the 2018 Billboard Music Awards. The album debuted at number six on the Billboard 200 and later peaked at number four on the chart, and also topped the Top R&B/Hip-Hop Albums chart. It eventually reached its 77th week in the top 10 of the latter chart, breaking a record set by Michael Jackson's Thriller (1982). It was certified five-times platinum by the Recording Industry Association of America (RIAA) and double platinum by the British Phonographic Industry (BPI).

== Background ==
Post Malone moved to Los Angeles when he was 18 years old after he was recommended working at Stevie B's studio by a friend, where he met FKi 1st. Malone released his debut single "White Iverson" in February 2015, which was produced with the help of FKi 1st. It became his breakout song, and afterward he began working with high-profile musicians such as Kanye West, Scott Storch, and Justin Bieber. He then signed to Republic Records during 2015. During February and March 2015, he toured with Fetty Wap on the Welcome to the Zoo tour alongside Monty. Malone also served as one of the opening acts for Bieber's Purpose World Tour throughout 2016. During May 2016, Malone released his debut mixtape August 26th, which was titled after the original planned release date of Stoney.

In June 2016, XXL editor-in chief Vanessa Satten, revealed that Malone was considered to be on XXL's "2016's Freshmen Class" magazine cover, however, she was told by Malone's team that he was not focused on making hip-hop. They further stated, "He was going into more of a rock / pop / country direction." Malone denied these claims, saying: "My love of music should never be questioned... I shouldn't be chastised for expressing myself in whichever way I see fit." He went on to explain that his mixtape, as well as his then-upcoming album are both hip-hop: "I have a hip-hop album coming out in August... I made a hip hop mixtape promoting my hip hop album." He also worked with West and Ty Dolla Sign on the song "Fade", which officially released during September 2016. From September to November 2016, Malone embarked on the Hollywood Dreams Tour with Jazz Cartier and Larry June, and FKi 1st. The title of Stoney is in reference to Malone's old nickname, "Stoney Maloney".

== Development ==
Malone began recording "White Iverson" two days after it was written. While staying at his house, he made the beat alongside FKi 1st of the production duo FKi, and later, Malone wrote the lyrics. They stayed up until 7 a.m., and Malone wanted to record it while the rest of the people staying at the house wanted to go to sleep. Raye Rich of FKi showed Malone how to use Pro Logic to get the main idea of the song down. After Rich heard what it sounded like, he knew he needed to record it. Malone called the process "a perfect culmination of everything". Pharrell Williams contacted Malone and the two met at Bonnaroo, when the former said "Let's get into the studio". After the Bonnaroo festival was done, the two met in a recording studio in Los Angeles, and eventually created "Up There". Halfway through recording Stoney, Malone wanted to hear every track that he was working, and picked out a track that the producer Frank Dukes had made. During January 2016, Bieber visited Malone while he was in the studio, and Bieber heard the track that Dukes made and wanted to appear on the song. Bieber started to freestyle in the recording booth, and he would trade ideas with Malone. The track ended up being the song "Deja Vu". There was also speculation about an appearance from West on the album, but it did not come into fruition. He only wanted to work with people he liked on both a personal level and an artist level, stating "I just wanted to make a body of work that was not only dope to hear, but you could hear the vibes that we captured working together" in an interview with iHeartRadio.

On Stoney, Malone also had the goal of creating music that separated himself from other hip-hop musicians. As he believed much of the music in the genre was cliché, he wanted to blend his guitar-playing and rock music into one sound that is "really fresh". Speaking with The Dallas Morning News, he described the album as "a full culmination of [his] work for the past year or so", and simply wanted to have fun and play the type of music he enjoys. Across the album, he was inspired by rock, rap, and country; genres that his father would listen to. He was also inspired by the music of Hank Williams, Dwight Yoakam, and Fleet Foxes on the deluxe edition tracks "Leave" and "Feeling Whitney". He did not want "White Iverson" to dictate his sound for the rest of his career, and simply described it as "[allowing] [his] music to be heard on a large scale". He also commented about how everything on Stoney "came together naturally" in an interview with HipHopDX.

== Composition ==
=== Overview ===
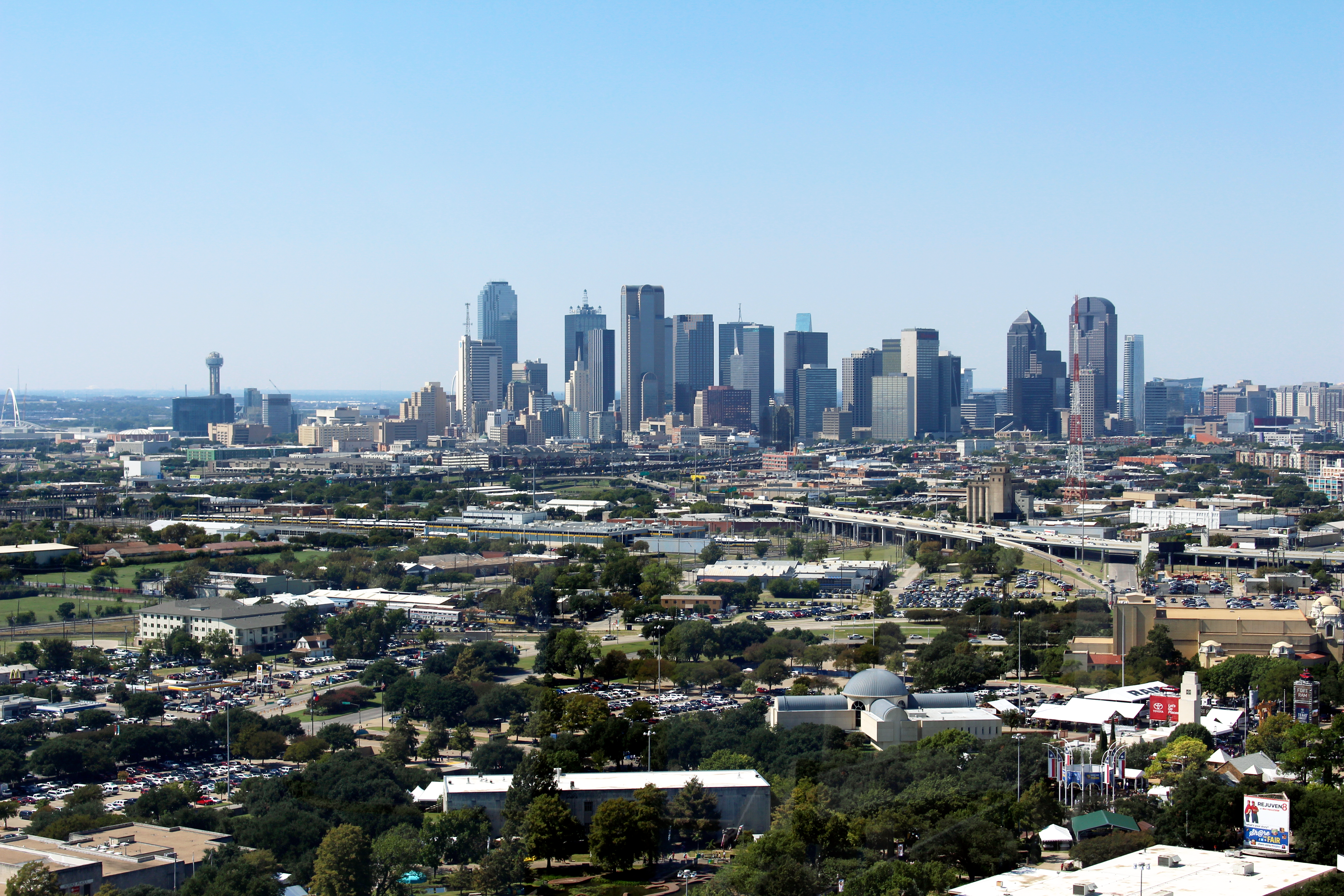
The sound of Stoney is a reflection of the influences that Malone took from his time living in the Dallas–Fort Worth area.

The standard edition of Stoney includes 14 tracks; the deluxe edition contains four additional tracks. The album predominately has a hip-hop sound with elements of R&B. Malone's natural vibrato is shown in the album, alongside lyrics that delve into money, luxury, drugs, and women. Malone generally sing-raps over the album's woozy production. The album's sound is characterized by the influences that he absorbed while living in the Dallas–Fort Worth area. This includes the people of the area, the sound, and its atmosphere. For HipHopDX, Eric Diep wrote that on the album, Malone shifts from pop, to country, to "made for radio" hip-hop. Anya Zoledziowski from Exclaim! highlighted the album's club music sound, due to the heavy bass and trap snares. AllMusic's Neil Z. Yeung described the album's tracks as "bleed[ing] indistinguishably into one another", and that the album "provides an appropriate soundtrack for a certain type of recreational rest and relaxation".

=== Songs ===
Stoney's opening track is "Broken Whiskey Glass", a country track that contains "outlaw grit" according to Yeung. Zoledziowski thought that it could "befit a country-western soundtrack", but commented how it doesn't fit the rest of the album. "Big Lie" contains a "booming" Mustard beat that was compared to Rihanna's Anti and Rae Sremmurd's SremmLife 2 (both 2016) by Pitchfork's Matthew Ramirez. He also mentioned the song's hook as being one of the strongest on the album. The laid-back pop and R&B "Deja Vu" contains a feature from Bieber; his appearance was called "as buttery as ever" by Matthew Schnipper from Pitchfork. It begins with a church organ as Malone's warbled voice sings atop the organ and a surf guitar. As the two sing the hook, they are accompanied by an "echoed coo". The track is about the beginning stages of Malone's relationship with his then-girlfriend. It drew numerous comparisons Drake's song "Hotline Bling" from 2015. "No Option" showcases Malone's vocals being pushed "to the limit" as described by Yeung. Diep wrote that it has the potential to chart on the Billboard Hot 100. Yeung wrote that, alongside the album's other guest appearances, River Tiber's background vocals on "Cold" "bolster Stoney with both atmosphere and credibility". "White Iverson" contains "subtly hypnotizing" production and vocals that "wander through the song like a conversation" per Complex. The vocals switch between singing and rapping, and is written about women, drugs, parties, and contains references to basketball. Its title is a reference to the basketball player Allen Iverson. Ramirez described it as "sleepy-eyed".

"I Fall Apart", a breakup song that was compared to Staind by Ramirez, shares experience of heartbreak. Over acoustic guitars, he sings about wanting to the numb the pain of the breakup using alcohol using his vibrato. The following "Patient" highlights Malone expressing his frustrations about the music industry and the price of fame. Referencing Stone Cold Steve Austin on "Go Flex", he sings about the challenges that come with pursuing relationships and chasing money atop faint acoustic guitar strums. With a "foot-stomp chorus" and the use of echoes that was compared to the Lumineers, it also uses tambourines and drums that are reminiscent of classic rock. "Feel" is a pop song that features vocals from Kehlani, which Glenn Gamboa from Newsday called Kehlani's "star turn". "Too Young", a trap song created with ASAP Yams in mind, is about Malone wanting to live long enough to see his success and enjoying the results of his work using his raw sing-song vocals. Featuring Quavo, "Congratulations" uses a trap beat to celebrate how being famous has changed Malone's life. The penultimate track of the standard edition, "Up There", showcases Malone's soft singing flowing over a piano melody. It features a bass-and-snare beat that is gentler compared to the rest of the album. The final track, "Yours Truly, Austin Post", begins with Malone announcing that he needs a "Bud Light break". The track has a hazy atmosphere, and is about him coming down from the "high of [his] life".

From the deluxe edition of Stoney, "Leave" is a country-influenced pop ballad that is about moving on from a past relationship. It incorporates guitar strings into its mix. "Hit This Hard" is followed by "Money Made Me Do It" featuring 2 Chainz, a trap song that pays homage to Bankroll Fresh. "Feeling Whitney" is an acoustic country song that delves into Malone's drug abuse.

== Promotion and release ==
The release of Stoney was announced on July 20, 2016, with its release date planned for August 26 of that year, until it was eventually delayed. He has since apologized for the delay of the album past its planned release date. When speaking on why the album was delayed, Malone commented: "We're just figuring things out […] I think we're making a sound that's super fresh, hip, original, very fly" in an interview with Real 92.3. During the same interview, he also revealed the album's guests, including Bieber, Quavo, Kehlani, and Williams. On November 3, 2016, he announced the album's eventual release date of December 9, its track list, and the album cover. The cover was photographed Nabil Elderkin, and depicts Malone in a pensive mood, resting his chin on his hands, against an orange background. The album cover is a part of a set of photographs that were taken during a photoshoot. The other photographs were included in the album's packaging and press photos. Commenting on the concept behind the cover, Malone said, it "comes from me being myself and remaining calm despite everything around me changing super quick".

Stoney was supported by several singles. Its lead single, "White Iverson" debuted at 84 and later peaked at number 14 on the Billboard Hot 100; it was certified diamond in the United States by the Recording Industry Association of America (RIAA). It was followed by "Too Young" on October 9, 2015. It was certified two-times platinum by the RIAA. "Go Flex" is the album's third single, released on April 21, 2016. It peaked at number 76 on the Hot 100 and was certified six-times platinum by the RIAA. Featuring Bieber, "Deja Vu" was leaked online one day before it was released on September 9, 2016. It peaked at number 75 on the Hot 100 and was certified platinum by the RIAA. "Congratulations" featuring Quavo was released as a promotional single on November 3, 2016, but was later sent to rhythmic radio on January 31, 2017. Malone's first single in the Hot 100 top 10, it peaked at number eight on the chart and was certified diamond and 14-times platinum by the RIAA. The album's final single, "I Fall Apart", was released to radio on October 17, 2017, after a live performance video of the song went viral on Twitter. It peaked at number 16 on the Hot 100 and was certified diamond by the RIAA. Stoney was also supported by two promotional singles. "Patient" was released as the first promotional single on November 18, 2016. It was certified platinum by the RIAA. The second promotional single was "Leave", from the album's deluxe edition, was released on December 2, 2016. It was certified platinum by the RIAA.

On June 9, 2016, Malone made his national television debut on Jimmy Kimmel Live!, performing the song, "Go Flex". During September 2016, he previewed "Congratulations" on the Hollywood Dreams Tour. He also performed "Congratulations" on July 30, 2017, with John Mayer and Tommy Lee. Throughout September and October 2017, he embarked on the Stoney Tour across the United States.

== Critical reception ==
Stoney ratings
Review scores
Source	Rating
AllMusic	2/5 stars
Exclaim!	6/10
HipHopDX	3.7/5
Newsday	B
Pitchfork	4.5/10

Stoney was met with mixed reviews from critics. In a review for HipHopDX, Diep acknowledged Malone's blend of pop, country and hip-hop. He mentioned how "Stoney adds to the canon of releases from Kodie Shane, D.R.A.M., and Rae Sremmurd who are redefining its standards through their curiosity and made directly for a younger audience". He lauded Malone's music, calling it "refreshing" and described him as "an emerging talent who can craft melodic hooks and infectious songs that stick". Writing for Exclaim!, Zoledziowski praised Stoney's emotional depth in songs such as "I Fall Apart" and "Feeling Whitney", and thought "Up There" was the best song on the album. However, she also expressed that though "White Iverson" is enjoyable, it seems out of place in the album's context, alongside "Broken Whiskey Glass" and "Leave". She summarized by saying she did not think that it was one of the strongest releases of the year, but thought that it showcases "Malone's ongoing ability to generate hits".

Writing a review for Newsday, Gamboa said that Malone's style on Stoney "generally pales in comparison to the inventiveness and the surprise" of "White Iverson". He also believed that though it is a promising album, it "doesn't quite live up to its potential". For Pitchfork, Ramirez gave Stoney a negative review, giving it a 4.5 out of ten rating. He wrote that although "White Iverson" was catchy, it did not warrant a 68-minute album. He thought that the problem with the album is at the source: "This thing is completely soulless". He gave Malone credit for his attempt at authenticity, but overall believed that Malone's commentary on topics such as relationships, drugs, and alcohol is not memorable and does not provide a new perspective. He concluded the review by stating, "I have a perhaps wishfully optimistic hope that Stoney could mark the end of a specific kind of rap album: the spiffy cash-in after the viral hit or mixtape run". Though Yeung from AllMusic believed that Malone's music is respectful of the hip-hop genre and culture, "there still seems to be something missing in the calculated white-guy-does-hip-hop formula". Stoney was considered the 50th best album of the year by the staff from Pigeons & Planes.

In an October 2017 interview with Paper magazine, Malone called Stoney "mediocre", and later told Nardwuar that he thought "White Iverson" was his only "good song" in December 2017.

=== Industry awards ===
Awards and nominations for Stoney
Year	Ceremony	Category	Result	Ref.
2018	Billboard Music Awards	Top Billboard 200 Album	Nominated	
2018	Billboard Music Awards	Top Rap Album	Nominated	
2018	Juno Awards	International Album of the Year	Nominated	

== Commercial performance ==
Stoney debuted at number six on the US Billboard 200 with 58,000 album-equivalent units, of which 19,000 were pure album sales. In its second week, the album dropped to number 23 on the chart, selling an additional 30,000 units. On June 6, 2018, the album was certified three-times platinum by the Recording Industry Association of America (RIAA) for combined sales and album-equivalent units of over three million units. On the week of October 28, 2017, the album peaked at number four on the US Billboard 200. By the end of 2017, Stoney had sold 1,564,000 album-equivalent units with 128,000 being pure sales. On Billboard's Top R&B/Hip-Hop Albums chart dated August 11, 2018, Stoney reached its 77th week in the top 10, breaking a record set by Michael Jackson's Thriller (1982). By September 2018, Stoney had sold 1,044,000 album-equivalent units that year. On April 22, 2021, the album was certified five-times platinum by the RIAA.

== Track listing ==
Stoney standard edition
No.	Title	Writer(s)	Producer(s)	Length
1.	"Broken Whiskey Glass"	Austin Post; Trocon Roberts, Jr.; Masamune Kudo; Idan Kalai	FKi 1st; Rex Kudo; Cashio	3:53
2.	"Big Lie"	Post; Dijon McFarlane; Louis Bell; Te Whiti Warbrick; Carl Rosen; Lewis Hughes; Nicholas Audino	Mustard; Bell^{[a]}; Twice as Nice^{[b]}	3:27
3.	"Deja Vu" (featuring Justin Bieber)	Post; Justin Bieber; Adam Feeney; Anderson Hernandez; Matthew Tavares; Kaan Güneşberk; Roberts; Bell; Rosen; Julian Swirsky	Frank Dukes; Vinylz	3:54
4.	"No Option"	Post; Roberts; Kalai; Bell; Bieber; Michael Hancock; Michael McGinnis; Christopher Rude	FKi 1st; Cashio; Bell^{[a]}	2:59
5.	"Cold"	Post; Roberts; Feeney	FKi 1st; Frank Dukes; Bell^{[a]}	4:28
6.	"White Iverson"	Post; Roberts; Kudo; Kalai; Andre Jackson	Post Malone; Rex Kudo	4:16
7.	"I Fall Apart"	Post; Carlo Montagnese; Billy Walsh	Illangelo	3:43
8.	"Patient"	Post; Bell; Rosen	Bell	3:14
9.	"Go Flex"	Post; Kalai; Kudo; Ryan Vojtesak	Rex Kudo; Charlie Handsome	2:59
10.	"Feel" (featuring Kehlani)	Post; Kehlani Parrish; Roberts; Kalai; Vojtesak	FKi 1st; Cashio; Charlie Handsome; Bell^{[a]}	3:17
11.	"Too Young"	Post; Michael Hernandez; Carlos Suarez; Justin Mosley	Foreign Teck; Rico Evans; Mosley	3:57
12.	"Congratulations" (featuring Quavo)	Post; Quavious Marshall; Leland Wayne; Feeney; Bell; Rosen	Metro Boomin; Frank Dukes; Bell^{[a]}	3:40
13.	"Up There"	Post; Pharrell Williams; Bell; Rosen	Williams; Bell^{[a]}	3:14
14.	"Yours Truly, Austin Post"	Post; Leon Thomas III; Jahphet Landis; Bell; Rosen	Thomas; Roofeeo; Bell^{[a]}	3:39
Total length:				50:40

Stoney deluxe edition
No.	Title	Writer(s)	Producer(s)	Length
15.	"Leave"	Post; Kudo; Vojtesak; Kalai	Rex Kudo; Charlie Handsome; Cashio	5:24
16.	"Hit This Hard"	Post; Montagnese; Walsh	Illangelo	4:09
17.	"Money Made Me Do It" (featuring 2 Chainz)	Post; Tauheed Epps; Roberts	FKi 1st; Bell^{[a]}	3:44
18.	"Feeling Whitney"	Post; Andrew Wotman	Watt; Bell^{[a]}	4:17
Total length:				68:14

=== Notes ===
- ^{^[a]}signifies an additional producer
- ^{^[b]}signifies a co-producer
- "Deja Vu" features background vocals from Kaan Güneşberk
- "Cold" features background vocals from River Tiber
- "Go Flex" features background vocals from Charlie Handsome and Peter Lee Johnson
- "Leave" features background vocals from Peter Lee Johnson
- "Feeling Whitney" features background vocals from Andrew Watt and Josh Gudwin

==== Sample credits ====
- "Big Lie" contains an interpolation from "Clouds", as performed by Gigi Masin.
- "No Option" contains excerpts from "Levitate", written by Michael Hancock, Michael McGinnis, and Christopher Rude, as performed by Viigo.

== Personnel ==
Credits adapted from the album's liner notes.

=== Recording locations ===
- Recorded at Kudo Studio (Pacific Palisades, Los Angeles) (tracks 1 and 9), Serenity West Recording (Los Angeles) (tracks 2–5, 7, and 14), Perfect Sound Studios (Los Angeles) (tracks 3, 5, and 10), The Gold House (Los Angeles) (track 6), Electric Feel Studios (Hollywood) (tracks 8, 12, and 13), Platinum Sound Recording Studios (New York City) (track 10), The Mekanics Studio (West Palm Beach, Florida) (track 11), Chalice Recording Studios (Hollywood) (track 13), and Germano Studios (New York City) (track 13)
- Mixed at Larrabee Studios (Universal City, California) (tracks 2–5, and 7–14) and The Gold House (Los Angeles) (track 6)
- Mastered at Bernie Grundman Mastering (Los Angeles) (tracks 1–5, and 7–14) and The Gold House (Los Angeles) (track 6)

=== Musicians ===
- Post Malone – guitar (tracks 1, 15, 18)
- Peter Lee Johnson – strings (tracks 1, 9, 15), guitar (tracks 9, 15)
- Matthew Tavares – guitar, bass, keyboards (track 3)
- Frank Dukes – percussion (track 3)
- Vinylz – percussion (track 3)
- Andrew Watt – guitar (tracks 4, 18), bass, string arrangement (track 18)
- Charlie Handsome – drums (track 9, 10), guitar (track 9), keyboards (track 10), bass (track 15)
- Rex Kudo – drums (tracks 9, 15)
- Idan Kalai – bass, drums, keyboards (track 10)
- Brent Paschke – electric guitars (track 13)
- Leon Thomas – guitars, bass (track 14)
- Khari Mateen – cello (track 18)
- Jessy Greene – cello (track 18), violin (track 18)

=== Production ===
- Rex Kudo – recording (tracks 1, 6, 15)
- Idan Kalai – recording (tracks 1, 6, 15)
- Andrew Maury – mixing (tracks 1, 15)
- Mike Bozzi – mastering (tracks 1–5, 7–10, 12–17)
- Louis Bell – recording (tracks 2–5, 8, 12, 14)
- Alex Pavone – recording assistance (tracks 2–6, 14, 16)
- Manny Marroquin – mixing (tracks 2–5, 7–14, 16, 17)
- Chris Galland – mixing assistance (tracks 2–5, 7–14, 16, 17)
- Robin Florent – mixing assistance (tracks 2–5, 7–14, 16, 17)
- Scott Desmarais – mixing assistance (tracks 2–5, 7–14, 16, 17)
- Jeff Jackson – mixing assistance (tracks 2–5, 7, 8, 10, 12–14, 16, 17)
- Illangelo – recording (tracks 7, 16)
- Ike Schultz – mixing assistance (tracks 9, 11)
- Big Bass Brian – mastering (track 11)
- Adam Feeney – recording (track 12)
- Andrew Coleman – recording (track 13)
- Dave Rowland – recording (track 13)
- Mike Larson – additional recording (track 13)
- David Kim – recording assistance (track 13)
- Josh Gudwin – recording (track 18), mixing (track 18)
- Nicolas Essig – recording (track 18)

=== Visuals and design ===
- Bryan Rivera – art director
- Travis Brothers – art director
- Henock Sileshi – art director
- Bobby Greenleaf – art director
- Nabil Elderkin – photography

== Charts ==
=== Weekly charts ===
2016–2020 chart performance for Stoney
Chart (2016–2020)	Peak position
Australian Albums (ARIA)	5
Austrian Albums (Ö3 Austria)	58
Belgian Albums (Ultratop Flanders)	23
Canadian Albums (Billboard)	5
Danish Albums (Hitlisten)	2
Dutch Albums (Album Top 100)	37
Finnish Albums (Suomen virallinen lista)	7
French Albums (SNEP)	81
German Albums (Offizielle Top 100)	72
Irish Albums (IRMA)	6
Italian Albums (FIMI)	47
Latvian Albums (LaIPA)	2
New Zealand Albums (RMNZ)	3
Norwegian Albums (VG-lista)	2
Scottish Albums (Official Charts)	97
Swedish Albums (Sverigetopplistan)	2
Swiss Albums (Schweizer Hitparade)	48
UK Albums (Official Charts)	10
US Billboard 200	4
US Top R&B/Hip-Hop Albums (Billboard)	1

2025 chart performance for Stoney
Chart (2025)	Peak position
Portuguese Albums (AFP)	81

=== Year-end charts ===
2017 year-end chart performance for Stoney
Chart (2017)	Position
Australian Albums (ARIA)	34
Canadian Albums (Billboard)	8
Danish Albums (Hitlisten)	7
French Albums (SNEP)	195
Icelandic Albums (Plötutíóindi)	5
New Zealand Albums (RMNZ)	11
Swedish Albums (Sverigetopplistan)	8
UK Albums (OCC)	51
US Billboard 200	7
US Top R&B/Hip-Hop Albums (Billboard)	5

2018 year-end chart performance for Stoney
Chart (2018)	Position
Australian Albums (ARIA)	13
Canadian Albums (Billboard)	6
Danish Albums (Hitlisten)	7
Estonian Albums (IFPI)	6
Icelandic Albums (Plötutíóindi)	21
Irish Albums (IRMA)	23
New Zealand Albums (RMNZ)	8
Swedish Albums (Sverigetopplistan)	13
UK Albums (OCC)	42
US Billboard 200	8
US Top R&B/Hip-Hop Albums (Billboard)	5

2019 year-end chart performance for Stoney
Chart (2019)	Position
Australian Albums (ARIA)	25
Belgian Albums (Ultratop Flanders)	77
Canadian Albums (Billboard)	23
Danish Albums (Hitlisten)	28
Icelandic Albums (Plötutíóindi)	48
Irish Albums (IRMA)	37
New Zealand Albums (RMNZ)	21
Norwegian Albums (VG-lista)	34
Swedish Albums (Sverigetopplistan)	41
UK Albums (OCC)	61
US Billboard 200	24
US Top R&B/Hip-Hop Albums (Billboard)	15

2020 year-end chart performance for Stoney
Chart (2020)	Position
Australian Albums (ARIA)	55
Belgian Albums (Ultratop Flanders)	111
Canadian Albums (Billboard)	43
Danish Albums (Hitlisten)	60
Dutch Albums (Album Top 100)	97
New Zealand Albums (RMNZ)	33
Norwegian Albums (VG-lista)	29
Swedish Albums (Sverigetopplistan)	79
US Billboard 200	45
US Top R&B/Hip-Hop Albums (Billboard)	27

2021 year-end chart performance for Stoney
Chart (2021)	Position
Australian Albums (ARIA)	78
Belgian Albums (Ultratop Flanders)	177
Danish Albums (Hitlisten)	85
Norwegian Albums (VG-lista)	39
US Billboard 200	67
US Top R&B/Hip-Hop Albums (Billboard)	34

2022 year-end chart performance for Stoney
Chart (2022)	Position
Australian Albums (ARIA)	89
US Billboard 200	91
US Top R&B/Hip-Hop Albums (Billboard)	87

2023 year-end chart performance for Stoney
Chart (2023)	Position
Australian Albums (ARIA)	83
US Billboard 200	109
US Top R&B/Hip-Hop Albums (Billboard)	83

2024 year-end chart performance for Stoney
Chart (2024)	Position
Australian Hip Hop/R&B Albums (ARIA)	37

=== Decade-end charts ===
Decade-end chart performance for Stoney
Chart (2010–2019)	Position
US Billboard 200	6

== Certifications and sales ==
Certifications and sales for Stoney
Region	Certification	Certified units/sales
Australia (ARIA)	2× Platinum	140,000^{‡}
Austria (IFPI Austria)	Gold	7,500^{*}
Brazil (Pro-Música Brasil)	Gold	20,000^{‡}
Canada (Music Canada)	6× Platinum	480,000^{‡}
Denmark (IFPI Danmark)	4× Platinum	80,000^{‡}
France (SNEP)	Gold	50,000^{‡}
Germany (BVMI)	Gold	100,000^{‡}
Iceland (Tónlistinn)	—	4,001
Italy (FIMI)	Gold	25,000^{‡}
Mexico (AMPROFON)	Platinum	60,000^{‡}
New Zealand (RMNZ)	6× Platinum	90,000^{‡}
Poland (ZPAV)	Platinum	20,000^{‡}
Portugal (AFP)	Gold	3,500^{‡}
Singapore (RIAS)	Gold	5,000^{*}
Sweden (GLF)	Platinum	30,000^{‡}
United Kingdom (BPI)	2× Platinum	600,000
United States (RIAA)	5× Platinum	5,000,000^{‡}
^{*} Sales figures based on certification alone.^{‡} Sales+streaming figures based on certification alone.
