= Yours (Post Malone song) =

2024 song by Post Malone

Song by Post Malone

from the album F-1 Trillion
- Released: August 16, 2024
- Length: 3:19
- Label: Mercury; Republic
- Songwriters: Austin Post; Louis Bell; Ryan Vojtesak; Ashley Gorley; Taylor Philips
- Producers: Bell; Charlie Handsome

Lyric video
- "Yours" on YouTube

"Yours" is a song by American musician Post Malone from his sixth studio album, F-1 Trillion (2024). It was produced by Louis Bell and Charlie Handsome.

== Background ==
In an interview with People, Post Malone said the song was inspired by his thoughts of his daughter's future wedding. He first shared a snippet of the song on social media on June 16, 2024 (Father's Day). He later performed the song "A Night in Nashville", a concert sponsored by Bud Light at the Marathon Music Works in Nashville, Tennessee on July 16, 2024.

== Composition ==
The song is about Post Malone's daughter marrying in the future, directly addressing her imaginary spouse. The instrumental consists of acoustic and pedal steel guitar and a drum pattern; After an intro of pedal steel, Malone reflects on his feelings of heartbreak when he has to give his daughter away.

== Critical reception ==
Neil Z. Yeung of AllMusic wrote the song "digs into an even deeper emotional well, showcasing how much he's matured and shifted life priorities in such a short span." Carl Wilson of Slate gave a critical review, considering it "possibly the least appealing song on F-1 Trillion" and commenting "it serves a degree of daddy-daughter possessive ick rarely seen since Bob Carlisle's 1997 embarrassment 'Butterfly Kisses.'"

== Charts ==
Chart performance for "Yours"
Chart (2024)	Peak position
Canada Hot 100 (Billboard)	35
Global 200 (Billboard)	109
US Billboard Hot 100	54
US Hot Country Songs (Billboard)	21
