= Guy for That =

2024 single by Post Malone featuring Luke Combs

Single by Post Malone featuring Luke Combs

from the album F-1 Trillion
- Released: July 26, 2024
- Length: 2:44
- Label: Republic; Mercury
- Songwriters: Austin Post; Luke Combs; Louis Bell; Ryan Vojtesak; Jonathan Hoskins; Ernest Keith Smith; James McNair
- Producers: Louis Bell; Charlie Handsome; Jonathan Hoskins

Post Malone singles chronology
"Pour Me a Drink" (2024)	"Guy for That" (2024)	"What Don't Belong to Me" (2024)

Luke Combs singles chronology
"Ain't No Love in Oklahoma" (2024)	"Guy for That" (2024)	"Backup Plan" (2025)

Music video
- "Guy for That" on YouTube

"Guy for That" is a song by American musician Post Malone featuring American country singer Luke Combs. It was released through Republic and Mercury Records as the third single from Malone's sixth studio album, F-1 Trillion, on July 26, 2024. Malone and Combs wrote the song with producers Louis Bell, Charlie Handsome, and Hoskins, alongside Ernest and James McNair. Malone posted a snippet of the song on social media in February 2024 before announcing its title and release date on July 22, 2024. Lyrically, both of them compare a broken relationship to a broken-down old car in terms of needing to be fixed.

== Music video ==
The official music video for "Guy for That" premiered on July 26, 2024. It starts with Malone and Combs walking out of a building into portable toilets. Once inside, a truck carrying the toilets starts driving and they end up in the middle of Nashville, Tennessee and do an impromptu street performance for fans on Broadway, before the video ends with them returning to their original location.

== Personnel ==
Credits adapted from Tidal.

- Post Malone – vocals
- Luke Combs – vocals
- Wes Hightower – background vocals
- Aaron Sterling – drums
- Derek Wells – acoustic guitar, electric guitar
- Craig Young – bass guitar
- Paul Franklin – steel guitar
- Dave Cohen – keyboards
- Larry Franklin – fiddle
- Andrew Boullianne – assistant engineer
- Collin Reynolds – assistant engineer
- Grant Morgan – assistant engineer
- Charlie Handsome – producer, programming
- Louis Bell – producer, vocal producer, programming, recording
- Ryan Gore – mixing
- Ted Jensen – mastering engineer
- Trent Woodman – recording

== Charts ==
=== Weekly charts ===
Weekly chart performance for "Guy for That"
Chart (2024–2025)	Peak position
Australia (ARIA)	18
Australia Country Hot 50 (The Music)	1
Canada Hot 100 (Billboard)	14
Canada Country (Billboard)	1
Global 200 (Billboard)	22
Ireland (IRMA)	24
Japan Hot Overseas (Billboard Japan)	13
Netherlands (Single Top 100)	99
New Zealand (Recorded Music NZ)	20
Norway (VG-lista)	15
South Korea BGM (Circle)	181
South Korea Download (Circle)	138
Sweden (Sverigetopplistan)	38
UK Singles (Official Charts)	25
US Billboard Hot 100	17
US Country Airplay (Billboard)	5
US Hot Country Songs (Billboard)	7

=== Year-end charts ===
2024 year-end chart performance for "Guy for That"
Chart (2024)	Position
US Hot Country Songs (Billboard)	51

2025 year-end chart performance for "Guy for That"
Chart (2025)	Position
Canada Country (Billboard)	16
US Country Airplay (Billboard)	37
US Hot Country Songs (Billboard)	43

== Certifications ==
Certifications for "Guy for That"
Region	Certification	Certified units/sales
Brazil (Pro-Música Brasil)	Platinum	40,000^{‡}
New Zealand (RMNZ)	Platinum	30,000^{‡}
United Kingdom (BPI)	Gold	400,000^{‡}
^{‡} Sales+streaming figures based on certification alone.
