= Too Young (Post Malone song) =

Single by Post Malone

from the album Stoney
- Released: October 9, 2015
- Length: 3:57
- Label: Republic
- Songwriters: Austin Post; Trocon Roberts Jr.; Michael Hernandez; Carlos Suarez; Justin Mosley; Jordan Mosley; Steven Bolden
- Producers: Foreign Teck; Rico Evans; Mosley

Post Malone singles chronology
"White Iverson" (2015)	"Too Young" (2015)	"Go Flex" (2016)

Music video
- "Too Young" on YouTube

"Too Young" is a song by American musician Post Malone. It was officially released through Republic Records on October 9, 2015, as the second single from his debut studio album, Stoney (2016). Malone wrote the song alongside producers Foreign Teck, Rico Evans, and Justin Mosley. The song was dedicated to Christian Taylor and rappers ASAP Yams and Chinx, who died prior to its release.

== Background ==
Post Malone said in an interview with Genius that "After A$AP Yams passed I recorded this song, so it's kind of an ode to him. We weren't friends but I think it was so cool how he was a cultural icon and he inspired so many people to do what they wanted to do. And he had such an influence on the youth of today. I think it was a tragedy that he went so soon. I just thought it was the right thing, to pay tribute to him. Then, in Dallas, this kid Christian Taylor passed. And he was on to this song before he was killed, and that is surreal. I was living with a kid in Dallas and I don’t know what happened but apparently the cops shot him and a couple days before he was killed he did the lyrics to my song. That is a crazy scenario. Fans have said it means a lot to them and I think that’s cool how a song reminds us that we can reach others with a different perspective and it can mean something to them as well. Everybody can relate to something in a certain way".

== Music video ==
The song's accompanying music video premiered on October 22, 2015 on Post Malone's Vevo account on YouTube. The music video was directed by John Rawlins.

== Charts ==
Chart (2016)	Peak position
US Bubbling Under R&B/Hip-Hop Singles (Billboard)	8

== Certifications ==
Region	Certification	Certified units/sales
Australia (ARIA)	Platinum	70,000^{‡}
Brazil (Pro-Música Brasil)	Platinum	60,000^{‡}
Canada (Music Canada)	2× Platinum	160,000^{‡}
New Zealand (RMNZ)	Gold	15,000^{‡}
Portugal (AFP)	Gold	10,000^{‡}
United Kingdom (BPI)	Silver	200,000^{‡}
United States (RIAA)	2× Platinum	2,000,000^{‡}
^{‡} Sales+streaming figures based on certification alone.

== Release history ==
Region	Date	Format	Ref.
United States	October 9, 2015	Digital download	
