= Deja Vu (Post Malone song) =

Single by Post Malone featuring Justin Bieber

from the album Stoney
- Released: September 9, 2016
- Genre: Pop; R&B
- Length: 3:50
- Label: Republic
- Songwriters: Austin Post; Justin Bieber; Adam Feeney; Anderson Hernandez; Matthew Tavares; Matthew Samuels; Kaan Güneşberk; Trocon Roberts Jr.; Louis Bell; Carl Rosen; Julian Swirsky
- Producers: Frank Dukes; Vinylz

Post Malone singles chronology
"Go Flex" (2016)	"Deja Vu" (2016)	"Fade" (2016)

Justin Bieber singles chronology
"Let Me Love You" (2016)	"Deja Vu" (2016)	"Despacito" (remix) (2017)

Audio video
- "Deja Vu" on YouTube

"Deja Vu" is a song by American musician Post Malone featuring Canadian singer Justin Bieber. It was released through Republic Records, as the fourth single from the former's debut studio album, Stoney (2016). The first collaboration between the two artists, they wrote the song alongside Matthew Tavares, Kaan Güneşberk, FKi 1st, Louis Bell, Carl Rosen, Julkeyz, and producers Frank Dukes and Vinylz.

Upon its release, the single charted at number 75 on the Billboard Hot 100 in the United States. It also topped the New Zealand Heatseekers charts, and made charts in Canada, France, the Netherlands, Scotland, Switzerland, and the United Kingdom, peaking within the top 20 in Sweden. It would later be certified 2× Platinum in Australia, Canada, and New Zealand, and was certified Platinum in the United States.

== Background ==
Before collaborating, Malone opened for Bieber on the Purpose World Tour, to support Bieber's fourth studio album, Purpose (2015), which led to the two artists developing a friendship. Malone was halfway through recording Stoney producer Frank Dukes played him an unfinished instrumental that he had come up with. In January 2016, Bieber visited Malone in the studio, in which he heard the beat and wanted to get on the song. Bieber immediately took to the beat and ended up recording his vocals, what would become the finished version of "Deja Vu" in the booth, with him and Malone going back and forth with ideas. After Bieber finished, Malone put the song together with the help of Bell and the others who were involved. Bell referred to the session as a high-pressure situation that "kept [him] on [his] toes" while he engineered and recorded the track. "Deja Vu" leaked online a day before its official release.

== Composition and lyrics ==
"Deja Vu" is a laid-back pop song with a deep R&B groove involving "wistful, detuned guitar riffs". It opens with a church organ that backs the track. Several critics made comparisons to Drake's "Hotline Bling" in regards to the song's sound. In particular, The Fader's David Renshaw said it "has an almost 'Hotline Bling'-esque tempo", while Madeline Roth of MTV News, Danny Schwartz of HotNewHipHop, and Billboard's Colin Stutz noted similarities between the two with the song's start. In a different comparison, Dana Getz of Entertainment Weekly wrote that it "features a slow fizz, cha-cha inflected beat akin to a drowsier take on Drake's 'One Dance'".

"Deja Vu" is about an on-and-off-again love where "Malone helms sluggish, lovesick verses". An echoed coo accompanies Malone and Bieber as they sing the hook, with the latter repeating before delivering his verse: "Tell me is that deja vu? / 'Cause you want me and I want you."

== Commercial performance ==
In the United States, the single charted at number 75 on the Billboard Hot 100 and at number 29 on the Rhythmic Airplay chart, and peaked at number 25 on the Hot R&B/Hip-Hop Songs chart. It was additionally certified Platinum by the Recording Industry Association of America (RIAA) for equivalent sales of 1,000,000 units in the United States. In Australia, although the single did not chart, it was certified 2× Platinum by the Australian Recording Industry Association (ARIA) for equivalent sales of 140,000 units in the country. In Canada, the single charted at number 43 on the Canadian Hot 100, and was certified 2× Platinum by Music Canada (MC) for equivalent sales of 160,000 units in the country. In Denmark, although the single did not chart, it was certified Gold by IFPI Danmark for equivalent sales of 45,000 units in the country.

In France, the single charted at number 151 on the French Singles Chart. In the Netherlands, the single charted at number 30 on the Dutch Single Top 100 chart. In New Zealand, the single topped the New Zealand Heatseekers charts, its highest position on any chart it made. It was also certified 2× Platinum by Recorded Music New Zealand (RMNZ) for equivalent sales of 60,000 units in the country. In Portugal, although the single did not chart, it was certified Gold by Associação Fonográfica Portuguesa (AFP) for equivalent sales of 5,000 units in the country. In Scotland, the single charted at number 44 on the Scottish Singles Chart. In Sweden, the single charted at number 14 on the Sweden Heatseeker chart. In the United Kingdom, the single charted at number 63 on the UK Singles Chart and was certified Gold by the British Phonographic Industry (BPI) for equivalent sales of 400,000 units in the country.

== Credits and personnel ==
- Post Malone – lead vocals, songwriting
- Justin Bieber – featured vocals, songwriting
- Frank Dukes – production, songwriting, programming, percussion
- Vinylz – production, songwriting
- Matthew Tavares – songwriting, guitar, bass guitar, keyboards
- Kaan Güneşberk – songwriting, background vocals
- FKi 1st – songwriting
- Louis Bell – songwriting
- Carl Rosen – songwriting
- Julkeyz – songwriting
- Manny Marroquin – mixing
- Louis Bell – recording
- Alex Pavone – other contributions

== Charts ==
Chart (2016)	Peak position
Canada Hot 100 (Billboard)	43
France (SNEP)	151
Netherlands (Single Tip)	30
New Zealand Heatseekers (RMNZ)	1
Scotland Singles (OCC)	44
Sweden Heatseeker (Sverigetopplistan)	14
UK Singles (OCC)	63
US Billboard Hot 100	75
US Hot R&B/Hip-Hop Songs (Billboard)	25
US Rhythmic Airplay (Billboard)	29

== Certifications ==
Region	Certification	Certified units/sales
Australia (ARIA)	2× Platinum	140,000^{‡}
Canada (Music Canada)	2× Platinum	160,000^{‡}
Denmark (IFPI Danmark)	Gold	45,000^{‡}
New Zealand (RMNZ)	2× Platinum	60,000^{‡}
Portugal (AFP)	Gold	5,000^{‡}
United Kingdom (BPI)	Gold	400,000^{‡}
United States (RIAA)	Platinum	1,000,000^{‡}
^{‡} Sales+streaming figures based on certification alone.

== Release history ==
Country	Date	Format	Label	Ref.
United States	September 9, 2016	Digital download; streaming	Republic	
United States	September 20, 2016	Rhythmic contemporary radio	Republic	
