= Congratulations (Post Malone song) =

2017 single by Post Malone

- Cover art for the remix

Single by Post Malone featuring Quavo

from the album Stoney
- Released: January 31, 2017
- Recorded: August 2016
- Genre: Hip-hop; trap
- Length: 3:40
- Label: Republic
- Songwriters: Austin Post; Quavious Marshall; Leland Wayne; Adam Feeney; Louis Bell; Carl Rosen
- Producers: Metro Boomin; Frank Dukes; Louis Bell

Post Malone singles chronology
"Fade" (2016)	"Congratulations" (2017)	"Rockstar" (2017)

Quavo singles chronology
"Good Drank" (2017)	"Congratulations" (2017)	"Want Her" (2017)

Music video
- "Congratulations" on YouTube

"Congratulations" is a song by American musician Post Malone featuring American rapper Quavo. The song, at first released as a promotional single from Malone's debut studio album Stoney (2016) on November 4, 2016, was released on January 31, 2017, as the fifth official single from the album. Malone and Quavo wrote the song with Carl Rosen and producers Metro Boomin, Frank Dukes, and Louis Bell. A remix, which includes an additional feature from fellow American rapper Future, was released on June 16, 2017.

== Background ==
Producers Frank Dukes, Metro Boomin, and Louis Bell began working with Post Malone on tracks for his debut album after the success of the single "White Iverson." During the writing process, they were watching the 2016 Summer Olympics and were inspired to create a triumphant song. At one point during the session, Post's manager Dre London shouted 'congratulations,' inspiring the chorus of the song.

Post Malone debuted the track while performing in Austin, Texas in September 2016, two months before the song's official release.

On May 9, 2017, the track was performed to Post Malone by a mariachi band, commissioned by Indonesian rapper Rich Brian.

On June 16, 2017, the official remix was released featuring an additional verse from Future.

== Composition ==
The song is written in the key of F♯ major with a tempo of 110 beats per minute.

== Music video ==
The song's accompanying music video premiered on January 23, 2017, on Post Malone's Vevo account on YouTube. The music video was directed by James DeFina. It features cameo appearances from Murda Beatz, Metro Boomin, Frank Dukes, and fellow members of the Migos crew. As of June 2025, the music video has been viewed over 1.6 billion times.

== Chart performance ==
The song peaked at number eight on the US Billboard Hot 100, becoming Post Malone's second top 20 hit, following his debut single, "White Iverson", and first top 10 hit, and has spent a total of 50 weeks on the chart. The song was later certified Diamond (11× Platinum) by the Recording Industry Association of America (RIAA) for combined sales and streaming equivalent units of over 11 million units in the United States.

== Personnel ==
Adapted from TIDAL.

Production

- Frank Dukes – production, songwriting; programming
- Metro Boomin – production, songwriting; programming
- Louis Bell – additional production, songwriting
- Post Malone – songwriting; vocals
- Carl Rosen – songwriting
- Quavo – songwriting; vocals

Technical

- Frank Dukes – recording
- Louis Bell – recording
- Manny Marroquin – mixing
- Chris Galland – assistant mixer
- Jeff Jackson – assistant mixer

== Charts ==
=== Weekly charts ===
Chart (2017–2018)	Peak position
Australia (ARIA)	30
Austria (Ö3 Austria Top 40)	68
Belgium (Ultratip Bubbling Under Flanders)	34
Belgium (Ultratip Bubbling Under Wallonia)	28
Canada Hot 100 (Billboard)	14
Czech Republic Singles Digital (ČNS IFPI)	48
Denmark (Tracklisten)	39
France (SNEP)	19
Germany (GfK)	88
Ireland (IRMA)	35
Latvia (DigiTop100)	27
Netherlands (Single Top 100)	80
New Zealand (Recorded Music NZ)	21
Portugal (AFP)	13
Scotland Singles (Official Charts)	75
Slovakia Singles Digital (ČNS IFPI)	54
Sweden (Sverigetopplistan)	34
Switzerland (Schweizer Hitparade)	77
UK Singles (Official Charts)	26
UK Hip Hop/R&B (Official Charts)	17
US Billboard Hot 100	8
US Hot R&B/Hip-Hop Songs (Billboard)	5
US Dance Airplay (Billboard)	10
US Pop Airplay (Billboard)	23
US Rhythmic Airplay (Billboard)	5

=== Year-end charts ===
Chart (2017)	Position
Australia (ARIA)	36
Brazil (Pro-Música Brasil)	182
Canada (Canadian Hot 100)	17
Denmark (Tracklisten)	61
Iceland (Tónlistinn)	32
New Zealand (Recorded Music NZ)	21
Portugal (AFP)	17
Sweden (Sverigetopplistan)	74
UK Singles (Official Charts Company)	62
US Billboard Hot 100	10
US Hot R&B/Hip-Hop Songs (Billboard)	6
US Rhythmic (Billboard)	12
Chart (2018)	Position
Australia (ARIA)	100
Portugal (AFP)	104
US Streaming Songs (Billboard)	72

== Certifications ==
Region	Certification	Certified units/sales
Australia (ARIA)	10× Platinum	700,000^{‡}
Brazil (Pro-Música Brasil)	3× Diamond	750,000^{‡}
Canada (Music Canada)	Diamond	800,000^{‡}
Denmark (IFPI Danmark)	2× Platinum	180,000^{‡}
France (SNEP)	Platinum	200,000^{‡}
Germany (BVMI)	Gold	200,000^{‡}
Italy (FIMI)	Platinum	50,000^{‡}
Mexico (AMPROFON)	Platinum+Gold	90,000^{‡}
New Zealand (RMNZ)	6× Platinum	180,000^{‡}
Poland (ZPAV)	2× Platinum	40,000^{‡}
Portugal (AFP)	3× Platinum	30,000^{‡}
Spain (Promusicae)	Platinum	60,000^{‡}
United Kingdom (BPI)	3× Platinum	1,800,000^{‡}
United States (RIAA)	14× Platinum	14,000,000^{‡}
Streaming
Sweden (GLF)	3× Platinum	24,000,000^{†}
^{‡} Sales+streaming figures based on certification alone.^{†} Streaming-only figures based on certification alone.

== Release history ==
Country	Date	Format	Label	Ref.
United States	November 4, 2016 (Note: Release as a promotional single.)	Digital download; streaming	Republic	
United States	January 31, 2017	Rhythmic contemporary radio	Republic	

== See also ==
- List of highest-certified singles in Australia
