= Pour Me a Drink =

2024 single by Post Malone featuring Blake Shelton

Single by Post Malone featuring Blake Shelton

from the album F-1 Trillion
- Released: June 21, 2024
- Genre: Country pop
- Length: 3:15
- Label: Republic; Mercury
- Songwriters: Austin Post; Louis Bell; Ryan Vojtesak; John Byron; Rocky Block; Jordan Dozzi
- Producers: Louis Bell; Charlie Handsome

Post Malone singles chronology
"I Had Some Help" (2024)	"Pour Me a Drink" (2024)	"Guy for That" (2024)

Blake Shelton singles chronology
"Purple Irises" (2024)	"Pour Me a Drink" (2024)	"Texas" (2024)

Music video
- "Pour Me a Drink" on YouTube

"Pour Me a Drink" is a song by American musician Post Malone featuring American country music singer Blake Shelton. It was released through Republic and Mercury Records as the second single from Malone's sixth studio album, F-1 Trillion, on June 21, 2024. Malone wrote the song with producers Louis Bell and Charlie Handsome, alongside John Byron, Rocky Block, and Jordan Dozzi. "Pour Me a Drink" is a country pop song.

== Release and promotion ==
On May 24, 2024, Malone previewed a snippet of the song through social media. On June 13, Malone announced that a single, "Pour Me a Drink" featuring Shelton, would be released on June 21.

== Accolades ==
Awards and nominations for "Pour Me a Drink"
Organization	Year	Category	Result	Ref.
People's Choice Country Awards	2024	The Music Video of 2024	Nominated	

== Personnel ==
Credits adapted from AllMusic.

- Post Malone – vocals
- Blake Shelton – vocals
- Aaron Sterling – drums
- Brent Mason – electric guitar
- Bryan Sutton – acoustic guitar
- Derek Wells – electric guitar
- Justin Schipper – steel guitar
- Craig Young – bass guitar
- Dave Cohen – keyboards
- Larry Franklin – fiddle
- Andrew Boullianne – assistant engineer
- Collin Reynolds – assistant engineer
- Grant Morgan – assistant engineer
- Charlie Handsome – producer
- Louis Bell – producer, programming, recording
- Ryan Gore – mixing
- Ted Jensen – mastering engineer
- Trent Woodman – recording

== Charts ==
=== Weekly charts ===
Weekly chart performance for "Pour Me a Drink"
Chart (2024)	Peak position
Australia (ARIA)	33
Australia Country Hot 50 (The Music)	46
Canada Hot 100 (Billboard)	12
Canada Country (Billboard)	1
Global 200 (Billboard)	18
Ireland (IRMA)	44
Japan Hot Overseas (Billboard Japan)	8
New Zealand (Recorded Music NZ)	37
Norway (VG-lista)	20
South Korea BGM (Circle)	126
South Korea Download (Circle)	165
Suriname (Nationale Top 40)	29
Sweden (Sverigetopplistan)	46
UK Singles (OCC)	34
US Billboard Hot 100	12
US Country Airplay (Billboard)	1
US Hot Country Songs (Billboard)	3

=== Year-end charts ===
2024 year-end chart performance for "Pour Me a Drink"
Chart (2024)	Position
Canada (Canadian Hot 100)	55
US Billboard Hot 100	76
US Country Airplay (Billboard)	49
US Hot Country Songs (Billboard)	22

2025 year-end chart performance for "Pour Me a Drink"
Chart (2025)	Position
Canada Country (Billboard)	31
US Country Airplay (Billboard)	30
US Hot Country Songs (Billboard)	50

== Certifications ==
Certifications for "Pour Me a Drink"
Region	Certification	Certified units/sales
New Zealand (RMNZ)	Platinum	30,000^{‡}
United Kingdom (BPI)	Silver	200,000^{‡}
United States (RIAA)	Platinum	1,000,000^{‡}
^{‡} Sales+streaming figures based on certification alone.
