= London Underground strikes =

Labour union action disrupting travel

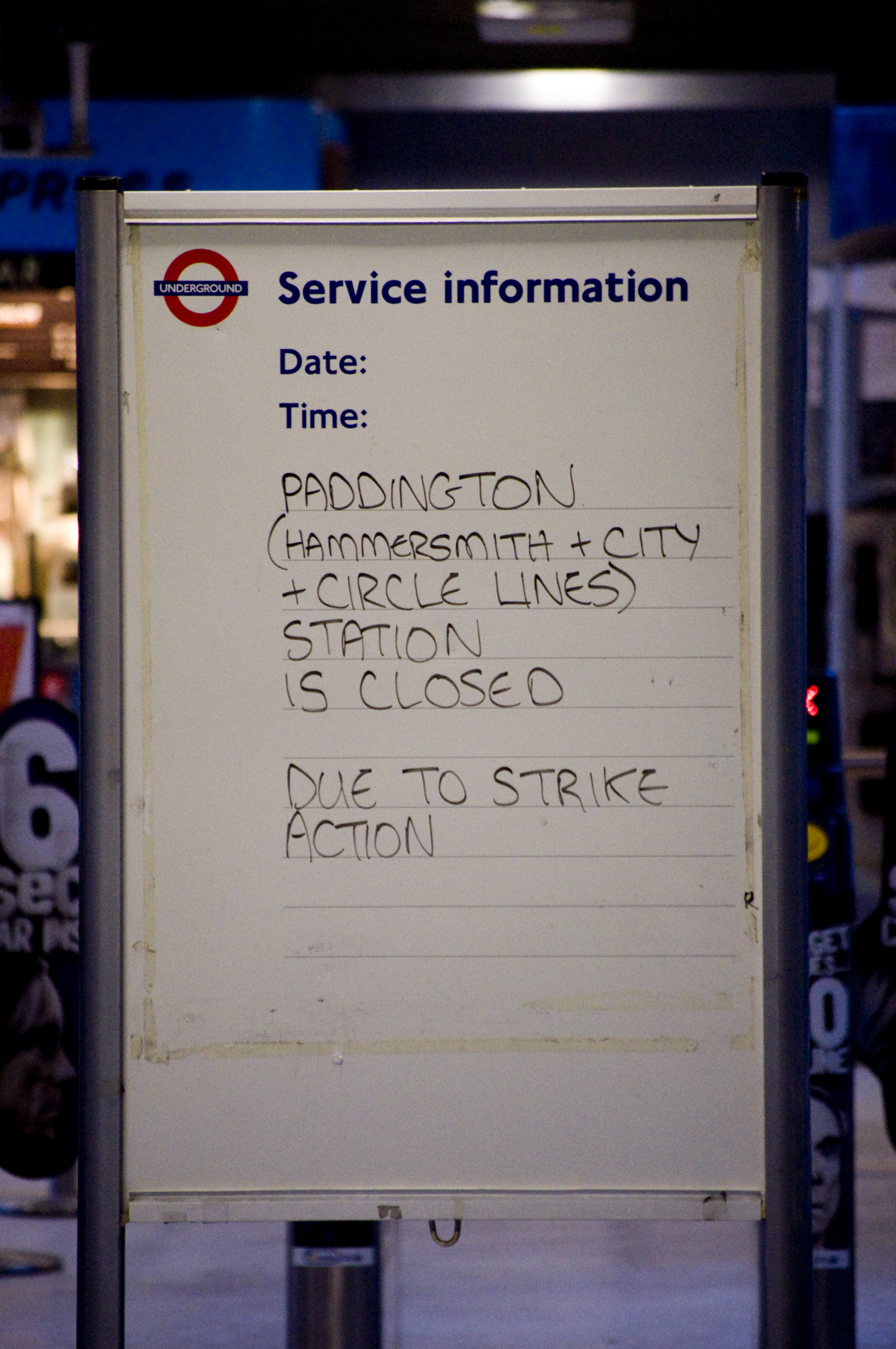
Tube Strike sign at Paddington.

London Underground strikes refers to the industrial action organised by trade unions which affect the London Underground rapid transit network. Described as "one of Britain's most strike-prone industries", trade unions, predominantly the National Union of Rail, Maritime and Transport Workers (RMT), which represent workers on the network, and Associated Society of Locomotive Engineers and Firemen (ASLEF), which represent Tube drivers, have launched strikes in response to disputes over job reductions, pensions, pay, safety, and working conditions.

== Background ==
Transport for London is the umbrella government body that operates the London Underground, through its subsidiary, London Underground Limited (LUL). Most workers on the network are represented by RMT, while ASLEF predominantly represent the train drivers. Other bodies also launch strike action, including the Transport Salaried Staffs' Association (TSSA).

== History ==
From 2000 to 2008, the RMT balloted for industrial action at least 50 times, resulting in member votes for strike action on 18 occasions. Overall, there were 30 separate strikes during this period.

== Response and impact ==
During the Tube strike on 19 August 2022, an increase in commuters in London was attributed to use of alternative transport methods, such as buses or public cycling, or using Tube lines unaffected by strikes, such as the Elizabeth Line. However, these modes of transport often quickly reach capacity during peak travel times.

The Tube strike on 10 November 2022 are estimated to have cost London's economy £14 million in lost output in one day, according to the Centre for Economics and Business Research: an estimated 78,000 commuters were unable to travel.

From 8 to 11 September 2025, London Underground staff staged strikes that shut down nearly all Tube lines, with only the Elizabeth line and London Overground unaffected.

=== Legislation ===
On 7 December 2022, a bill requiring minimum levels of service to be maintained on transport networks in order to launch strikes, was introduced to Parliament, but was not debated.

== List of strikes and closures ==
Start	End	Participants	Nature of dispute	Notes
2010-09-06 17:00, 2100 BST	2010-09-07 2100 BST	RMT, TSSA	Removal of 800 safety-critical jobs. "RMT are up in arms at TfL's attempts to get volunteers to help people's travel plans."	"Boris Bikes part of plans to mitigate effects of London tube strike".
2010-10-03 1830 BST	2010-10-04 1900 BST	RMT, TSSA	800 job losses	24-hour strike, during which TfL claimed 40% of services were running; union leaders asked Prime Minister David Cameron to intervene
2010-11-28	2010-11-29	RMT, TSSA	LU cutting 800 jobs, largely ticket office staff; unions say staff cuts affect safety and ability to combat crime, terrorism	Fourth in a series of one-day strikes
2011-06-19 2100 BST	2011-06-20 0300 BST	RMT	Sacking of Northern Line driver Arwyn Thomas; LU claimed it was due to abusive behaviour toward colleagues, while RMT claimed it was punitive for being a union activist	First of four planned walkouts; only six hours long, it led to accusations that RMT was staging "pointless" strikes to enable further strikes; on 22 June 2011, a tribunal ruled that the sacking was unfair; on 24 June 2011, further strikes cancelled after London Underground reinstated the Tube driver at the centre of the dispute
2014-02-04	2014-02-06	RMT, TSSA	Protest against plans to cut 750 jobs, automate ticket sales, close ticket offices	Two-thirds of services halted during 48-hour strike; second 48-hour strike called off
2014-04-28	2014-04-30 2100 BST	RMT	Plans to close all ticket offices and loss of 960 jobs	Network-wide closure; per London Underground, 52% of services were running on 30 April 2014
2016-12-24	2016-12-25	RMT	Tube station staffing and impact on safety after cutting 900 front-line jobs and closing ticket offices; per TFL, "Christmas and New Year Working"	Called off on 22 December 2016, but Hammersmith & City and District Lines were closed
2017-01-08 1800 GMT	2017-01-09 1800 GMT	RMT	In response to the cutting of 900 station jobs; per TfL, "Station Staffing and Safety Arrangements"	"This action has been forced on us by savage cuts to jobs that have reduced London Underground to an under-staffed death trap at a time of heightened security and safety alert."
2022-06-06	2022-06-07 0800 BST	RMT on some lines	Jobs and pensions	Complete suspension of Piccadilly Line; Bakerloo and Jubilee Lines remained open; other lines reported closed despite TfL claiming "good service" elsewhere
2022-06-21	2022-06-22	RMT	Compulsory redundancies and pensions	Timed to coincide with the first of three National Rail strike days; some reduction in TfL service on the other days where track is shared
2022-08-19	2022-08-20 0800 BST	RMT, Unite	Pensions, jobs, and working conditions	Timed to coincide with major industrial action by 40,000 RMT members working for Network Rail and 14 train operators on 18 and 20 August 2022
2022-11-10	2022-11-11	RMT, Unite	Jobs and pensions	Nine out of eleven London Underground stations closed; Central and Northern Lines partially open
2022-11-25	2022-11-25	RMT at some Tube stations	Reduction of 600 station staff jobs	Some stations opened later or closed earlier, including Euston, Green Park, Heathrow Terminals 2 & 3, Heathrow Terminal 4, Heathrow Terminal 5, Hatton Cross, Hounslow West, King's Cross St Pancras, and Victoria
2023-03-15	2023-03-18	RMT at all the Tube stations	Thousands of union staff walked out in a dispute over pensions and working arrangements.	All stations were closed.
2024-01-05	2024-01-11	RMT	Below-inflation pay increase of 5%	
2025-09-07	2025-09-12	RMT	"Pay, fatigue management, shift patterns and a reduction in hours."	Most Underground service was suspended, with some lines only receiving a partial service.

== See also ==
- 2022–2024 United Kingdom railway strikes
