= Losers (song) =

2024 single by Post Malone featuring Jelly Roll

Single by Post Malone featuring Jelly Roll

from the album F-1 Trillion
- Released: January 9, 2025
- Genre: Country
- Length: 3:29
- Label: Mercury; Republic
- Songwriters: Austin Post; Louis Bell; Ryan Vojtesak; Ernest Smith; Ashley Gorley; Chandler Walters; Joe Reeves
- Producers: Bell; Charlie Handsome

Post Malone singles chronology
"What Don't Belong to Me" (2024)	"Losers" (2025)	"Cold" (2025)

Jelly Roll singles chronology
"Liar" (2024)	"Losers" (2025)	"Hard Fought Hallelujah (Remix)" (2025)

Lyric video
- "Losers" on YouTube

"Losers" is a song by American musician Post Malone from his sixth studio album, F-1 Trillion (2024). It features American rapper Jelly Roll and was produced by Louis Bell and Charlie Handsome. The song was sent to Italian radio stations as the album's fifth single on January 9, 2025.

== Background ==
On August 8, 2024, Post Malone teased the song on social media with a clip of its chorus. The song is dedicated to "losers" and people who have been rejected by society.

== Critical reception ==
Robin Murray of Clash regarded F-1 Trillion to be "at its strongest" when Post Malone "aligns himself with country rebels and outliers", citing "Losers" as an example.

== Charts ==
=== Weekly charts ===
Weekly chart performance for "Losers"
Chart (2024)	Peak position
Australia (ARIA)	95
Canada Hot 100 (Billboard)	27
New Zealand Hot Singles (RMNZ)	5
Global 200 (Billboard)	52
Sweden Heatseeker (Sverigetopplistan)	12
US Billboard Hot 100	25
US Hot Country Songs (Billboard)	12

=== Year-end charts ===
2024 year-end chart performance for "Losers"
Chart (2024)	Position
US Hot Country Songs (Billboard)	93

== Certifications ==
Certifications for "Losers"
Region	Certification	Certified units/sales
Brazil (Pro-Música Brasil)	Gold	20,000^{‡}
^{‡} Sales+streaming figures based on certification alone.
