= What Don't Belong to Me =

2024 single by Post Malone

Single by Post Malone

from the album F-1 Trillion
- Released: September 12, 2024
- Genre: Country pop; synth-pop
- Length: 3:27
- Label: Mercury; Republic
- Songwriters: Austin Post; Louis Bell; Ryan Vojtesak; Ernest Smith; Ashley Gorley; James Maddocks
- Producers: Bell; Charlie Handsome

Post Malone singles chronology
"Guy for That" (2024)	"What Don't Belong to Me" (2024)	"Losers" (2025)

Lyric video
- "What Don't Belong To Me" on YouTube

"What Don't Belong to Me" is a song by American musician Post Malone from his sixth studio album, F-1 Trillion. It was sent to Italian radio station as the album's fourth single on September 12, 2024. The song was produced by Louis Bell and Charlie Handsome.

== Critical reception ==
Joseph Hudak of Rolling Stone called the song "a harmless slice of pop country that has more in common with Brett Young than Steve Young". Neil Z. Yeung of AllMusic wrote the song "digs into an even deeper emotional well, showcasing how much he's matured and shifted life priorities in such a short span." Meaghan Garvey of Pitchfork described the song as "perhaps left off his last record and gussied up with pedal steel." With respect to his style of country music of F-1 Trillion, Neil McCormick of The Telegraph remarked that Post Malone "proves genuinely good at this stuff, with a sharp lyrical wit and sweet singing voice that rises to heights of soulful passion when needs be, notably on the disco flecked What Don't Belong to Me". Ammar Kalia of The Observer wrote that Malone's voice "shines through, dropping the post-production processing to [...] yearn on the soulful What Don't Belong to Me."

== Charts ==
Chart performance for "What Don't Belong to Me"
Chart (2024)	Peak position
Canada Hot 100 (Billboard)	38
Global 200 (Billboard)	87
New Zealand Hot Singles (RMNZ)	8
US Billboard Hot 100	40
US Hot Country Songs (Billboard)	16
