= F-1 Trillion =

2024 studio album by Post Malone

Studio album by Post Malone
- Released: August 16, 2024
- Recorded: 2023–2024
- Genres: Country; country pop
- Length: 59:42
- Labels: Mercury; Republic
- Producers: Louis Bell; Charlie Handsome; Jonathan Hoskins

Post Malone chronology
Austin (2023)	F-1 Trillion (2024)	Post Malone Tribute to Nirvana (2025)

Singles from F-1 Trillion
- 1. "I Had Some Help" Released: May 10, 2024; 2. "Pour Me a Drink" Released: June 21, 2024; 3. "Guy for That" Released: July 26, 2024; 4. "What Don't Belong to Me" Released: September 12, 2024; 5. "Losers" Released: January 9, 2025

F-1 Trillion is the sixth studio album by American musician Post Malone. It was released through Mercury and Republic Records on August 16, 2024. The album marks Malone's transition to country music and features guest appearances from Tim McGraw, Hank Williams Jr., Morgan Wallen, Blake Shelton, Dolly Parton, Brad Paisley, Luke Combs, Lainey Wilson, Jelly Roll, Ernest, Sierra Ferrell, Chris Stapleton, Hardy, and Billy Strings. The album was produced by Louis Bell, Charlie Handsome, and Jonathan Hoskins.

The album was supported by the release of five singles: "I Had Some Help", "Pour Me a Drink", "Guy for That", "What Don't Belong to Me", and "Losers". Upon release, F-1 Trillion received mostly positive reviews from music critics and charted at number one in Canada, the Netherlands, New Zealand, Norway, the United Kingdom, and the United States. An extended edition of the album, subtitled Long Bed, was released twelve hours after the standard edition.

== Background and composition ==
I split my time between a lot of different things because I am happily obligated to do concerts and show love to my fans and then I'm happily obligated to write music and make beats by myself, and I'm happily obligated to, you know, take care of my family. So, it's a lot of time, and it's about finding that space to allot that time. If I get another year to myself, maybe I'll make a fucking country album.

— Post Malone to The Howard Stern Show in 2022

In June 2022, Malone was interviewed by The Howard Stern Show, in which he was asked by host Howard Stern about potentially making a country album in the future: "To be honest, there's nothing stopping me from taking a camera or setting up in my studio in Utah and just recording a country album [to put] on YouTube. I'm allowed to do that. I'm a human being". Malone began exploring country music for the first time in 2023, when he appeared on a re-recording of "Pickup Man" by Joe Diffie, reaching the Hot Country Songs chart for the first time at number 34. In March 2024, he appeared on Beyoncé's country album Cowboy Carter as a featured artist on the track "Levii's Jeans", later peaking at number 5 on the Hot Country Songs chart. F-1 Trillion features collaborations with numerous artists from the country genre, including Tim McGraw, Hank Williams Jr., Morgan Wallen, Blake Shelton, Dolly Parton, Brad Paisley, Luke Combs, Lainey Wilson, Jelly Roll, Ernest, Sierra Ferrell, Chris Stapleton, Hardy, and Billy Strings, while the album's production was handled by Louis Bell, Charlie Handsome, and Hoskins. It is a country album with country pop elements. In an interview with Apple Music, Malone explained the recording and writing process of the album:

"I've always wanted to make a record like this, but for the longest time, it seems so inaccessible because I don't know how the hell it works. But going in there and meeting Derek and Larry Franklin and Paul Franklin and Craig and Dave Cohen and Aaron, and it was just, like, so cool. And then it's crazy to watch Derek Charta a playthrough of a voice memo and chart it and then go in there and they know it immediately. But we would go for like a week at a time or like a week and a half and around work and everything, and we would go and just write. And there's a lot of writers on these songs because we just sat and we stayed up till, like, six in the morning. All the buddies came in. We all just drank and fucking tossed shit around. And I learned that that's nothing usually, how it goes. Instead, we have, like, Luke and Mo and Hardy, and we're just sitting. And we got so many writers and not even necessarily there to write, just to, like, jam and then hang out."

== Promotion ==
=== Singles ===
On May 10, 2024, Malone released the lead single of the album, "I Had Some Help", which features American country music singer Morgan Wallen. Commercially, the song debuted atop the Billboard Hot 100 with the highest weekly sales and streams since 2020, giving Malone his sixth number-one song. On May 16, 2024, Malone performed the unreleased song "Never Love You Again" and "I Had Some Help" at the 59th Academy of Country Music Awards in Frisco, Texas. On June 21, 2024, Malone released the second single of the album, "Pour Me a Drink", featuring American country music singer Blake Shelton, and also shared the album's cover art. On July 16, Malone performed at Music City's Marathon Music Works in Nashville, Tennessee. The set included the unreleased songs "Yours" and "Hide My Gun", with HARDY joining him for the latter song. On July 26, 2024, Malone released the third single of the album, "Guy for That", which features American country music singer Luke Combs. The track listing of the album was confirmed on July 31 via social media. An extended edition of the album, subtitled Long Bed, was released less than 12 hours after its release, featuring nine additional tracks. "What Don't Belong to Me" was sent to Italian radio stations as the album's fourth single on September 12, 2024, followed by "Losers" featuring Jelly Roll on January 9, 2025.

=== Tour ===
On June 25, 2024, Malone shared the dates for the F-1 Trillion Tour, which began on September 8, 2024, at the Utah First Credit Union Amphitheatre in West Valley City, Utah, and concluded on October 27, 2024, at the Germania Insurance Amphitheater in Austin, Texas.

== Critical reception ==
Professional ratings
Aggregate scores
Source	Rating
AnyDecentMusic?	6.4/10
Metacritic	71/100
Review scores
Source	Rating
AllMusic	3.5/5 stars
Clash	7/10
The Guardian	3/5 stars
The Independent	4/5 stars
The Observer	3/5 stars
Pitchfork	7.0/10
Rolling Stone	3.5/5 stars
The Spectator	B
Spectrum Culture	56%
The Telegraph	4/5 stars

According to the review aggregator Metacritic, F-1 Trillion received "generally favorable reviews" based on a weighted average score of 71 out of 100 from nine critic scores. Aggregator AnyDecentMusic? gave it 6.4 out of 10, based on their assessment of the critical consensus.

Robin Murray of Clash gave the album a positive review, commending Malone's creativity and his commercial appeal. Murray states that even though F-1 Trillion at times is "struggling beneath its own weight", the album "is a love letter to the genre". Neil Z. Yeung from AllMusic reviewed F-1 Trillion positively, describing the album as "full-on country foray" and opining that the album will please fans of the country music genre. In a positive review, Joseph Hudak of Rolling Stone wrote that the album would have benefited from containing fewer features and more solo songs from Malone. Hudak praised "the most stripped-down" tracks, highlighting "Never Love You Again", "Missin' You Like This", and "M-E-X-I-C-O". Writing for The Independent, Helen Brown praised Malone's songwriting skills and states that the album showcases his skills in songcraft. She wrote that although F-1 Trillion "loses some of his distinctive sound – and has none of the cool experiments of Beyoncé's record – it also showcases his undeniable songcrafting [sic] chops. Drivetime DJs are going to love it, and their listeners are all going to feel they're at the wheels of beaten-up American trucks".

Writing for Pitchfork, Meaghan Garvey opined that Malone's "shift to fun, low-stakes pop-country feels so right, you wonder why it took so long". Garvey comments further on Malone's entry into the country music scene, writing that "there's enough proof here that Post has the voice, demeanor, and goodwill to easily ingratiate himself into the Nashville scene". Neil McCormick of The Telegraph commended the album, writing that it represents "pure good ol' boy country" and that "Malone proves genuinely good at this stuff, with a sharp lyrical wit and sweet singing voice that rises to heights of soulful passion when needs be, notably on the disco flecked 'What Don't Belong to Me' and twisty alt-folk of 'Nosedive'".

In a mixed review, Michael Cragg of The Guardian believed the album to be "a little formulaic" and in need of more risk-taking by Malone. Cragg wrote that "there's a lot to enjoy about F-1 Trillion, and it feels tailor-made for chart domination, but as much as Malone felt hip hop was limiting his oeuvre, it at least gifted him moments to really let loose, as on the ludicrous epic 'Take What You Want' featuring Ozzy Osbourne and Travis Scott. On F-1 Trillion, trussed up in full country cosplay, he's shooting a little too straight". In a review for Consequence, Mary Siroky wrote that "F-1 Trillion is enjoyable because Post Malone came to have fun — and, more importantly, to commit fully to a genre he has clearly long enjoyed and admired. He did the work, and it paid off. The tunes are accessible and perfectly aligned with what so many people love about the genre, but if Malone continues in this vein, the things he should chase are those moments where his heart is totally on the line". Garvey opined that "most of the collaborations are solid" on the record, praising Dolly Parton's performance on "Have The Heart", while criticizing the song "Hide My Gun" and the opening track "Wrong Ones" for their lack of energy. Ammar Kalia of The Observer described F-1 Trillion as "surprisingly enjoyable", while deeming it too long, "overly polished and missing the instrumental virtuosity central to the genre".

== Commercial performance ==
In the United States, F-1 Trillion debuted at number one on the Billboard 200 chart, earning 250,000 album-equivalent units, including 80,000 in pure album sales. With the deluxe edition included, the album's tracks earned a total of 212.86 million on-demand streams in its first week. It is Malone's third album to reach number one on the chart, and sixth album to reach the top-ten. In the United Kingdom, the album debuted atop the UK Albums Chart, becoming Malone's third to debut at that position. The album also topped the charts in Canada, the Netherlands, New Zealand and Norway.

== Accolades ==
Awards and nominations for F-1 Trillion
Organization	Year	Category	Result	Ref.
Grammy Awards	2025	Best Country Album	Nominated	
Grammy Awards	2025	Best Recording Package	Nominated	
Canadian Country Music Association Awards	2025	Top Selling Album	Won	
Country Music Association Awards	2025	Album of the Year	Nominated	

Year-end lists
Publication	Rank	List
Billboard	1	The 10 Best Country Albums of 2024
Holler	9	The 25 Best Country Albums of 2024
Taste of Country	1	The 10 Best Country Albums of 2024

== Track listing ==
All tracks produced by Louis Bell and Charlie Handsome, with "I Had Some Help", "Guy for That", and "Devil I've Been" also being additionally produced by Jonathan Hoskins.

F-1 Trillion track listing
No.	Title	Writer(s)	Length
1.	"Wrong Ones" (featuring Tim McGraw)	Austin Post; Louis Bell; Ryan Vojtesak; Luke Combs; Ernest Keith Smith; James McNair	3:15
2.	"Finer Things" (featuring Hank Williams Jr.)	Post; L. Bell; Vojtesak; Combs; Smith; Josh Thompson; McNair	3:05
3.	"I Had Some Help" (featuring Morgan Wallen)	Post; Morgan Wallen; L. Bell; Vojtesak; Jonathan Hoskins; Smith; Ashley Gorley; Chandler Walters	2:58
4.	"Pour Me a Drink" (featuring Blake Shelton)	Post; L. Bell; Vojtesak; John Byron; Rocky Block; Jordan Dozzi	3:15
5.	"Have the Heart" (featuring Dolly Parton)	Post; L. Bell; Vojtesak; Lainey Wilson; Bradley Paisley; Gorley	3:03
6.	"What Don't Belong to Me"	Post; L. Bell; Vojtesak; Smith; Gorley; James Maddocks	3:27
7.	"Goes Without Saying" (featuring Brad Paisley)	Post; L. Bell; Vojtesak; Gorley; Thompson; Chase McGill; Joe Reeves	3:32
8.	"Guy for That" (featuring Luke Combs)	Post; Combs; L. Bell; Vojtesak; Hoskins; Smith; McNair	2:44
9.	"Nosedive" (featuring Lainey Wilson)	Post; L. Bell; Vojtesak; Combs; Smith; Billy Walsh; McNair	3:12
10.	"Losers" (featuring Jelly Roll)	Post; L. Bell; Vojtesak; Smith; Gorley; Walters; Reeves	3:29
11.	"Devil I've Been" (featuring Ernest)	Post; Smith; L. Bell; Vojtesak; Hoskins; Walters	3:02
12.	"Never Love You Again" (featuring Sierra Ferrell)	Post; L. Bell; Vojtesak; Chris Tompkins; Rhett Akins	3:06
13.	"Missin' You Like This" (featuring Luke Combs)	Post; Combs; L. Bell; Vojtesak; Michael Hardy; Gorley; McNair	3:42
14.	"California Sober" (featuring Chris Stapleton)	Post; Chris Stapleton; L. Bell; Vojtesak; Mark Holman	3:24
15.	"Hide My Gun" (featuring Hardy)	Post; Hardy; L. Bell; Vojtesak; Smith; Walsh; Alexander Izquierdo	3:40
16.	"Right About You"	Post; L. Bell; Vojtesak; Smith; Walters	3:03
17.	"M-E-X-I-C-O" (featuring Billy Strings)	Post; L. Bell; Vojtesak; McGill	2:35
18.	"Yours"	Post; L. Bell; Vojtesak; Gorley; Taylor Philips	3:19
Total length:			57:51

F-1 Trillion: Long Bed extended track listing
No.	Title	Writer(s)	Length
1.	"Fallin' in Love"	Post; L. Bell; Vojtesak; Smith; Thompson; Block	2:51
2.	"Dead at the Honky Tonk"	Post; L. Bell; Vojtesak; Smith; Gorley; Byron	3:33
3.	"Killed a Man"	Post; L. Bell; Vojtesak; Geoff Warburton; Joe Fox; Jimi Bell	3:05
4.	"Ain't How it Ends"	Post; L. Bell; Vojtesak; Smith; Gorley; Reeves	3:21
5.	"Hey Mercedes"	Post; L. Bell; Vojtesak	3:22
6.	"Go to Hell"	Post; L. Bell; Vojtesak	4:27
7.	"Two Hearts"	Post; L. Bell; Vojtesak; Smith; Dean Dillon; Jessie Jo Dillon	3:26
8.	"Who Needs You"	Post; L. Bell; Vojtesak; Smith; Walters; Blake Pendergrass	2:49
9.	"Back to Texas"	Post; L. Bell; Vojtesak; Yuval Haim Chain; Hero Delano; Thompson; Block	2:47
Total length:			87:44

== Personnel ==
Musicians

- Post Malone – lead vocals
- Craig Young – bass
- Aaron Sterling – drums
- Derek Wells – electric guitar (all tracks), acoustic guitar (tracks 8, 9, 15)
- Larry Franklin – fiddle
- Dave Cohen – keyboards
- Louis Bell – programming
- Charlie Handsome – programming
- Paul Franklin – pedal steel (tracks 1–4, 6, 9–11, 13–15, 18), steel guitar (8)
- Wes Hightower – background vocals (tracks 1, 2, 6–8, 12–18)
- Bryan Sutton – acoustic guitar (tracks 1, 3, 4, 6, 7, 10–13, 16, 17)
- Tim McGraw – vocals (track 1)
- Todd Lombardo – acoustic guitar (tracks 2, 5, 14, 18)
- Hank Williams Jr. – vocals (track 2)
- Morgan Wallen – vocals (track 3)
- Brent Mason – electric guitar (tracks 4, 7, 12, 16, 17)
- Justin Schipper – steel guitar (track 4), pedal steel (7, 12, 16)
- Blake Shelton – vocals (track 4)
- Dolly Parton – vocals (track 5)
- Brad Paisley – electric guitar, vocals (track 7)
- Luke Combs – vocals (tracks 8, 13)
- Lainey Wilson – vocals (track 9)
- Jelly Roll – vocals (track 10)
- Ernest – vocals (track 11)
- Sierra Ferrell – vocals (track 12)
- Chris Stapleton – vocals (track 14)
- Hardy – vocals (track 15)
- Billy Strings – vocals (track 17)

Technical

- Louis Bell – production, engineering, vocal production
- Charlie Handsome – production
- Hoskins – co-production (tracks 3, 8)
- Ted Jensen – mastering
- Ryan Gore – mixing
- Trent Woodman – engineering (tracks 1–7, 9–18)
- Eric Lutkins – engineering (track 1)
- Byron Gallimore – vocal engineering (track 1)
- Joey Moi – vocal engineering (tracks 3, 15)
- Scott Hendricks – vocal engineering (track 4)
- Andrew Boullianne – engineering assistance
- Collin Reynolds – engineering assistance
- Grant Morgan – engineering assistance (tracks 1–8, 10–18)
- Nick Mac – engineering assistance (tracks 1, 2, 15)
- Ryan Oswald – engineering assistance (tracks 1, 2, 15)

== Charts ==
=== Weekly charts ===
Weekly chart performance for F-1 Trillion
Chart (2024–2025)	Peak position
Australian Albums (ARIA)	2
Australian Country Albums (ARIA)	1
Austrian Albums (Ö3 Austria)	5
Belgian Albums (Ultratop Flanders)	4
Belgian Albums (Ultratop Wallonia)	15
Canadian Albums (Billboard)	1
Czech Albums (ČNS IFPI)	10
Danish Albums (Hitlisten)	4
Dutch Albums (Album Top 100)	1
Finnish Albums (Suomen virallinen lista)	19
French Albums (SNEP)	21
German Albums (Offizielle Top 100)	5
Greek Albums (IFPI)	23
Icelandic Albums (Tónlistinn)	6
Irish Albums (Official Charts)	5
Italian Albums (FIMI)	24
Japanese Digital Albums (Oricon)	20
Japanese Hot Albums (Billboard Japan)	92
Lithuanian Albums (AGATA)	43
New Zealand Albums (RMNZ)	1
Norwegian Albums (VG-lista)	1
Polish Albums (ZPAV)	33
Portuguese Albums (AFP)	10
Scottish Albums (Official Charts)	3
Slovak Albums (ČNS IFPI)	13
Spanish Albums (Promusicae)	12
Swedish Albums (Sverigetopplistan)	3
Swiss Albums (Schweizer Hitparade)	2
UK Albums (Official Charts)	1
UK Country Albums (Official Charts)	1
US Billboard 200	1
US Top Country Albums (Billboard)	1

Chart (2026)	Peak position
Greek Albums (IFPI) Long Bed edition	94

=== Year-end charts ===
2024 year-end chart performance for F-1 Trillion
Chart (2024)	Position
Australian Albums (ARIA)	62
Australian Country Albums (ARIA)	10
Canadian Albums (Billboard)	43
US Billboard 200	62
US Top Country Albums (Billboard)	15

2025 year-end chart performance for F-1 Trillion
Chart (2025)	Position
Australian Albums (ARIA)	51
Canadian Albums (Billboard)	16
New Zealand Albums (RMNZ)	47
US Billboard 200	18
US Top Country Albums (Billboard)	4

== Certifications ==
Certifications for F-1 Trillion
Region	Certification	Certified units/sales
Australia (ARIA)	Gold	35,000^{‡}
Brazil (Pro-Música Brasil)	Gold	20,000^{‡}
Denmark (IFPI Danmark)	Gold	10,000^{‡}
New Zealand (RMNZ)	Platinum	15,000^{‡}
United Kingdom (BPI)	Gold	100,000^{‡}
United States (RIAA)	Platinum	1,000,000^{‡}
^{‡} Sales+streaming figures based on certification alone.
