= Wrong Ones =

2024 song by Post Malone featuring Tim McGraw

Song by Post Malone featuring Tim McGraw

from the album F-1 Trillion
- Released: August 16, 2024
- Genre: Country; roots rock
- Length: 3:15
- Label: Republic; Mercury
- Songwriters: Austin Post; Louis Bell; Ryan Vojtesak; Luke Combs; Ernest Keith Smith; James McNair
- Producers: Bell; Charlie Handsome

Lyric video
- "Wrong Ones" on YouTube

"Wrong Ones" is a song by American musician Post Malone featuring American country singer Tim McGraw. It was released on August 16, 2024, from Malone's sixth studio album, F-1 Trillion. Malone wrote the song with producers Louis Bell and Charlie Handsome, alongside Luke Combs, Ernest, and James McNair.

== Background ==
On August 5, 2024, Malone released a teaser video for "Wrong Ones" in which features Malone out in a field sporting clays with his shotgun. "Wrong Ones" is a country and roots rock song without a bridge.

== Critical reception ==
Max Buondonno of Country Central referred to the song as "the electrifying instrumentals set the perfect stage for collaborator Tim McGraw to shine".

== Charts ==
Chart performance for "Wrong Ones"
Chart (2024)	Peak position
Canada Hot 100 (Billboard)	24
Global 200 (Billboard)	43
New Zealand Hot Singles (RMNZ)	2
Sweden Heatseeker (Sverigetopplistan)	11
US Billboard Hot 100	23
US Hot Country Songs (Billboard)	11
