= Go Flex =

Single by Post Malone

from the album Stoney
- Released: April 21, 2016
- Genre: Hip-hop
- Length: 3:01
- Label: Republic
- Songwriters: Austin Post; Masamune Kudo; Idan Kalai; Ryan Vojtesak
- Producers: Charlie Handsome; Rex Kudo

Post Malone singles chronology
"Too Young" (2015)	"Go Flex" (2016)	"Deja Vu" (2016)

Music video
- "Go Flex" on YouTube

"Go Flex" is a song by American musician Post Malone. It was released through Republic Records as the third single from his debut studio album, Stoney, on April 21, 2016. Malone wrote the song alongside Cashio and producers Rex Kudo and Charlie Handsome.

== Music video ==
The song's accompanying music video premiered on April 28, 2016, on Post Malone's Vevo account on YouTube. The video features a cameo appearance by Lia Marie Johnson. As of February 2024, the video has received more than 430 million views on YouTube.

== Commercial performance ==
"Go Flex" debuted at number 94 on the Billboard Hot 100 for the chart dated May 14, 2016. It re-entered at number 100 for the chart dated October 14, 2017, over a year later, reaching a new peak of number 88, two weeks later. It spent 11 weeks on the charts. The song was certified 6× Platinum by the Recording Industry Association of America (RIAA) for sales of over six million units in the United States. In 2018, the song was covered by Canadian singer-songwriter Charlotte Cardin.

== Charts ==
Chart (2016–2018)	Peak position
Canada Hot 100 (Billboard)	74
Czech Republic Singles Digital (ČNS IFPI)	82
Ireland (IRMA)	63
Latvia (DigiTop100)	44
Portugal (AFP)	58
Slovakia Singles Digital (ČNS IFPI)	63
Sweden (Sverigetopplistan)	54
UK Singles (OCC)	100
US Billboard Hot 100	76
US Hot R&B/Hip-Hop Songs (Billboard)	30
US Rhythmic Airplay (Billboard)	29

== Certifications ==
Region	Certification	Certified units/sales
Australia (ARIA)	5× Platinum	350,000^{‡}
Brazil (Pro-Música Brasil)	2× Platinum	120,000^{‡}
Canada (Music Canada)	7× Platinum	560,000^{‡}
Denmark (IFPI Danmark)	Platinum	90,000^{‡}
France (SNEP)	Gold	100,000^{‡}
Germany (BVMI)	Gold	200,000^{‡}
Italy (FIMI)	Gold	25,000^{‡}
New Zealand (RMNZ)	4× Platinum	120,000^{‡}
Poland (ZPAV)	Gold	25,000^{‡}
Portugal (AFP)	Platinum	10,000^{‡}
United Kingdom (BPI)	Platinum	600,000^{‡}
United States (RIAA)	6× Platinum	6,000,000^{‡}
Streaming
Sweden (GLF)	2× Platinum	16,000,000^{†}
^{‡} Sales+streaming figures based on certification alone.^{†} Streaming-only figures based on certification alone.
