= White Iverson =

Single by Post Malone

from the album Stoney
- Released: February 4, 2015
- Recorded: 2014
- Genre: Cloud rap; hip-hop; pop
- Length: 4:14
- Label: Republic
- Songwriters: Austin Post; Trocon Roberts Jr.; Idan Kalai; Masamune Kudo; Ikenna Asonye; Andre Jackson; Nikhil Lal
- Producer: Post Malone

Post Malone singles chronology
"White Iverson" (2015)	"Too Young" (2015)

Music video
- "White Iverson" on YouTube

"White Iverson" is the debut single by American musician Post Malone. It was released through Republic Records on August 14, 2015, as the lead single from his debut studio album, Stoney (2016). It was originally released on February 4, 2015, through Malone's SoundCloud account. Malone produced and wrote it alongside FKi 1st and Rex Kudo. It peaked at number 14 on the Billboard Hot 100 songs chart in the United States. The single is widely known as the song that garnered him mainstream attention.

== Background and release ==
Post moved to Los Angeles and met FKi 1st, who introduced him to Rex Kudo, who in turn helped him produce "White Iverson". Post recorded the song two days after he wrote it. He thought of the name after getting braids in his hair, thinking he looked like a "White Iverson", a reference to the professional basketball player, Allen Iverson. Upon completion in February 2015, it was uploaded to Post's SoundCloud account. It quickly brought him attention from record labels, gaining over a million plays the month it was uploaded. He decided to sign with Republic Records.

== Music video ==
The song's accompanying music video, edited and directed by Van Alpert, premiered on July 19, 2015, on Post Malone's YouTube account. Since its release, the music video has received over 1 billion views on YouTube.

Post said in an episode of the h3h3Productions podcast that the music video cost $5,000 and took only a day to make. He also commented that Rolls-Royce Motor Cars contacted the owner of the car following the release, stating they were incorrectly using the car.

== Remix ==
The official remix was released on December 7, 2015, featuring French Montana and Rae Sremmurd. Lil Wayne also released a remix to "White Iverson" entitled "Too Young" for his mixtape No Ceilings 2. The song also shares the same title of Malone's second official single, which is, as well, the second single from his debut album Stoney. Rapper Montana of 300 released a remix titled "White Iverson/Milly Rock Remix".

== Chart performance ==
"White Iverson" debuted at number 84 on the Billboard Hot 100 for the chart dated September 26, 2015, and peaked at number 14 for the chart dated January 23, 2016. The song was certified Diamond by the Recording Industry Association of America (RIAA) for sales of ten million digital copies. The song has earned both 1 billion streams on Spotify and 1 billion views on YouTube.

== Charts ==
=== Weekly charts ===
Chart (2015–2017)	Peak position
Canada Hot 100 (Billboard)	41
Ireland (IRMA)	91
Latvia (DigiTop100)	89
Portugal (AFP)	71
UK Singles (OCC)	117
US Billboard Hot 100	14
US Hot R&B/Hip-Hop Songs (Billboard)	5
US Pop Airplay (Billboard)	27
US Rhythmic Airplay (Billboard)	1

=== Year-end charts ===
Chart (2016)	Position
US Billboard Hot 100	65
US Hot R&B/Hip-Hop Songs (Billboard)	31
US Rhythmic (Billboard)	29

== Certifications ==
Region	Certification	Certified units/sales
Australia (ARIA)	4× Platinum	280,000^{‡}
Brazil (Pro-Música Brasil)	2× Platinum	120,000^{‡}
Canada (Music Canada)	7× Platinum	560,000^{‡}
Denmark (IFPI Danmark)	Platinum	90,000^{‡}
Germany (BVMI)	Gold	200,000^{‡}
Italy (FIMI)	Gold	25,000^{‡}
New Zealand (RMNZ)	4× Platinum	120,000^{‡}
Portugal (AFP)	Platinum	20,000^{‡}
Spain (Promusicae)	Gold	30,000^{‡}
United Kingdom (BPI)	Platinum	600,000^{‡}
United States (RIAA)	Diamond	10,000,000^{‡}
^{‡} Sales+streaming figures based on certification alone.
