= Mark Morrison discography =

- Studio albums: 2
- Extended plays: 2
- Singles: 20

The discography of British R&B singer Mark Morrison includes two studio albums, two EPs and 20 singles.

== Albums ==
List of studio albums, with selected chart positions and certifications
Title	Album details	Peak chart positions										Certifications
Title	Album details	UK	AUS	AUT	CAN	FRA	GER	NLD	SWE	SWI	US	Certifications
Return of the Mack	Released: 22 April 1996 (UK); Labels: Mack Life, Atlantic; Formats: CD, LP, cassette	4	24	22	32	44	27	23	29	5	76	BPI: Gold; MC: Gold
Innocent Man	Released: 1 May 2006 (UK); Labels: Mack Life, Mona; Formats: CD, digital download	—	—	—	—	—	—	—	—	—	—	
"—" denotes a recording that did not chart or was not released in that territory.

== Extended plays ==
List of EPs, with selected chart positions
Title	EP details	Peak chart positions
Title	EP details	UK
Only God Can Judge Me	Released: 15 September 1997 (UK); Labels: Mack Life, Atlantic; Formats: CD, LP, cassette	50
I Am What I Am	Released: 7 July 2014; Label: Mack Life; Format: Digital download	—

== Singles ==
=== As lead artist ===
List of singles as a lead artist, with selected chart positions and certifications, showing year released and album name
Title	Year	Peak chart positions										Certifications	Album
Title	Year	UK	AUS	AUT	FRA	GER	NLD	NZ	SWE	SWI	US	Certifications	Album
"Where Is Our Love"	1993	—	—	—	—	—	—	—	—	—	—		Non-album single
"Crazy"	1995	19	—	—	—	—	—	—	—	—	—		Return of the Mack
"Let's Get Down"	1995	39	—	—	—	—	—	—	—	—	—		Return of the Mack
"Return of the Mack"	1996	1	2	7	12	5	6	3	2	7	2	BPI: Platinum; ARIA: Platinum; BVMI: Gold; RIAA: 5× Platinum; SNEP: Silver	Return of the Mack
"Crazy" (Remix)	1996	6	18	—	—	68	—	22	46	—	—		Return of the Mack
"Trippin'"	1996	8	—	—	—	—	—	39	—	—	—		Return of the Mack
"Horny"	1996	5	—	—	—	92	79	45	30	—	—	BPI: Silver	Return of the Mack
"Moan & Groan"	1997	7	—	—	—	—	—	44	—	—	76		Return of the Mack
"Who's the Mack!"	1997	13	—	—	—	—	—	35	—	—	—		Only God Can Judge Me
"Best Friend" (featuring Gabrielle and Conner Reeves)	1999	23	—	—	—	—	—	50	—	—	—		Innocent Man
"Just a Man" / "Backstabbers"	2004	48	—	—	—	—	—	—	—	—	—		Innocent Man
"Innocent Man" (featuring DMX)	2006	46	—	—	—	—	—	—	—	—	—		Innocent Man
"Dance 4 Me" (featuring Tanya Stephens)	2007	—	—	—	—	—	—	—	—	—	—		Innocent Man
"N.A.N.G. 2.0" (featuring Crooked I and Shonie)	2013	—	—	—	—	—	—	—	—	—	—		I Am What I Am
"2Morrow" (featuring Erene, Devlin and Crooked I)	2014	—	—	—	—	—	—	—	—	—	—		Non-album singles
"My Life 2.0" (featuring Rick Ross and Tory Lanez)	2016	—	—	—	—	—	—	—	—	—	—		Non-album singles
"Return of the Mack" (SeeB Remix) (with SeeB)	2017	—	—	—	—	—	—	—	—	—	—		Non-album singles
"I Am What I Am" (Florian Paetzold Remix)	2017	—	—	—	—	—	—	—	—	—	—		Non-album singles
"Trippin' On Me" (with David Zowie)	2018	—	—	—	—	—	—	—	—	—	—		Non-album singles
"My Life" (with Tep No)	2020	—	—	—	—	—	—	—	—	—	—		Non-album singles
"Cooped Up / Return of the Mack" (with Post Malone and Sickick)	2022	—	—	—	—	—	—	—	—	—	—	ARIA: Gold	Non-album singles
"Okayyy We Back" (with Andy Mineo)	2025	—	—	—	—	—	—	—	—	—	—		The And
"—" denotes a recording that did not chart or was not released in that territory.

=== As featured artist ===
List of singles as a featured artist, with selected chart positions and certifications, showing year released and album name
Title	Year	Peak chart positions			Album
Title	Year	UK	NZ Hot	US	Album
"I'm On 3.0" (Trae tha Truth featuring T.I., Dave East, Tee Grizzley, Royce da 5'9", Curren$y, DRAM, Snoop Dogg, Fabolous, Rick Ross, Chamillionaire, G-Eazy, Styles P, E-40, Mark Morrison and Gary Clark, Jr.)	2017	—	—	—	Tha Truth, Pt. 3
"Provide" (G-Eazy featuring Chris Brown and Mark Morrison)	2021	98	3	64	These Things Happen Too (Deluxe)
"—" denotes a recording that did not chart or was not released in that territory.

== Guest appearances ==
Year	Song	Album
2000	"Baccstabbers" (Daz Dillinger featuring Mark Morrison & Tray Deee)	R.A.W.
2007	"Innocent Man (Misunderstood)" (Cassidy featuring Mark Morrison)	B.A.R.S. The Barry Adrian Reese Story
2012	"I'm On 2.0" (Trae featuring Mark Morrison, Big K.R.I.T., Jadakiss, J. Cole, Kendrick Lamar, B.o.B, Tyga, Gudda Gudda & Bun B)	Tha Blackprint
2016	"The Mack" (Nevada featuring Mark Morrison & Fetty Wap)	Non-album single
