= Twelve Carat Tour =

2022–2023 concert tour by Post Malone

- Tour by Post Malone
- Location: North America; Australia; Europe
- Associated album: Twelve Carat Toothache
- Start date: September 10, 2022
- End date: May 20, 2023
- Legs: 3
- No. of shows: 63
- Supporting acts: Zack Bia; Roddy Ricch; Smitty; Rae Sremmurd
- Attendance: 726,693
- Box office: $93,739,349

Post Malone concert chronology
- Runaway Tour (2019–2020); Twelve Carat Tour (2022–2023); If Y'all Weren't Here, I'd Be Crying Tour (2023)

The Twelve Carat Tour was the fifth concert tour by American musician Post Malone, in support of his fourth studio album Twelve Carat Toothache (2022). The tour began in Omaha on September 10, 2022, and concluded in Amsterdam on May 20, 2023.

== Background ==
On June 13, 2022, Post Malone announced his fourth concert tour, along with his opener, fellow American rapper and singer Roddy Ricch, who joined him on the European leg of the Beerbongs & Bentleys Tour in 2019. On June 17, additional shows were added in Toronto, Boston, New York City, Inglewood, and Los Angeles. During the first week of touring, it was announced on Zack Bia's Instagram that he would provide an opening DJ set on the shows Roddy Ricch was absent from.

On September 17, 2022, Post was performing at his St. Louis concert when he fell onstage due to a trapdoor for his acoustic guitar not being shut. Despite the fall, he finished the show in a condensed form and went on with the tour the following night. A week later, Post had to postpone his second Boston concert to October 10 due to waking up with stabbing pains and cracking noises from the spot which he hit his ribs when he fell onstage the week prior. He returned to the tour on schedule three nights later even though his hospitalization revealed he had a minor rib fracture.

On February 28, 2023, Post announced the European leg of the tour, with Rae Sremmurd joining as the opening act on most dates.

== Set list ==
This set list is from the concert on September 11, 2022 in Saint Paul. It is not intended to represent all concerts for the duration of the tour.

1. "Reputation"
2. "Wow."
3. "I Like You (A Happier Song)"
4. "Wrapped Around Your Finger"
5. "Better Now"
6. "Psycho"
7. "Candy Paint"
8. "I Fall Apart"
9. "Euthanasia"
10. "Stay"
11. "Go Flex"
12. "Circles"
13. "Love/Hate Letter to Alcohol"
14. "Take What You Want"
15. "When I'm Alone"
16. "Over Now"
17. "Rockstar"
18. "Insane"
19. "Cooped Up" (with Roddy Ricch)
20. "Sunflower"
21. "One Right Now"
22. "Congratulations"

Encore

23. "White Iverson"

== Tour dates ==
List of 2022 concerts
Date (2022)	City	Country	Venue	Opening Act(s)	Attendance	Revenue
September 10	Omaha	United States	CHI Health Center	Smitty	13,345 / 13,345	$1,796,289
September 11	Saint Paul	United States	Xcel Energy Center	Roddy Ricch	13,953 / 13,953	$1,963,288
September 14	Chicago	United States	United Center	Roddy Ricch	13,094 / 13,094	$1,879,551
September 15	Milwaukee	United States	Fiserv Forum	Roddy Ricch	11,146 / 11,146	$1,365,687
September 17	St. Louis	United States	Enterprise Center	Roddy Ricch	12,703 / 12,703	$1,729,229
September 18	Columbus	United States	Nationwide Arena	Roddy Ricch	13,075 / 13,075	$1,956,158
September 20	Toronto	Canada	Scotiabank Arena	Zack Bia	25,802 / 25,802	$3,232,912
September 21	Toronto	Canada	Scotiabank Arena	Zack Bia	25,802 / 25,802	$3,232,912
September 23	Boston	United States	TD Garden	Zack Bia	12,331 / 12,331	$1,899,475
September 27	Cleveland	United States	Rocket Mortgage FieldHouse	Zack Bia	12,246 / 12,246	$1,417,937
September 28	Pittsburgh	United States	PPG Paints Arena	Zack Bia	12,912 / 12,912	$1,786,319
October 1	Detroit	United States	Little Caesars Arena	Zack Bia	13,054 / 13,054	$2,180,000
October 2	Indianapolis	United States	Gainbridge Fieldhouse	Zack Bia	11,156 / 11,156	$1,729,983
October 4	Washington, D.C.	United States	Capital One Arena	Roddy Ricch; Zack Bia	13,045 / 13,045	$1,647,248
October 6	Philadelphia	United States	Wells Fargo Center	Roddy Ricch; Zack Bia	12,531 / 12,531	$1,785,961
October 7	Newark	United States	Prudential Center	Roddy Ricch; Zack Bia	12,138 / 12,138	$1,660,269
October 9	Elmont (Note: Labeled as Belmont Park in promotional material.)	United States	UBS Arena	Roddy Ricch; Zack Bia	12,713 / 12,713	$1,384,574
October 10 (Note: The concert of October 10, 2022 at TD Garden in Boston was originally scheduled for September 24, but was rescheduled due to hospitalization following Post falling onstage during the St. Louis show on September 17.)	Boston	United States	TD Garden	Zack Bia	—	—
October 12	New York City	United States	Madison Square Garden	Roddy Ricch; Zack Bia	24,880 / 24,880	$3,286,899
October 13	New York City	United States	Madison Square Garden	Roddy Ricch; Zack Bia	24,880 / 24,880	$3,286,899
October 15	Columbia	United States	Colonial Life Arena	Roddy Ricch; Zack Bia	12,240 / 12,240	$1,793,476
October 16	Nashville	United States	Bridgestone Arena	Roddy Ricch; Zack Bia	12,742 / 12,742	$2,002,795
October 18	Atlanta	United States	State Farm Arena	Roddy Ricch; Zack Bia	11,639 / 11,639	$1,275,002
October 21	Dallas	United States	American Airlines Center	Roddy Ricch; Zack Bia	12,826 / 12,826	$2,027,802
October 22	Austin	United States	Moody Center	Roddy Ricch; Zack Bia	11,263 / 11,263	$1,690,911
October 25	Houston	United States	Toyota Center	Roddy Ricch; Zack Bia	11,103 / 11,103	$2,020,282
October 26	Fort Worth	United States	Dickies Arena	Roddy Ricch; Zack Bia	11,860 / 11,860	$1,473,785
October 28	Tulsa	United States	BOK Center	Zack Bia	12,222 / 12,222	$1,443,581
October 30	Denver	United States	Ball Arena	Zack Bia; Antonio Diego	10,750 / 10,750	$1,893,423
November 1	Salt Lake City	United States	Vivint Arena	Roddy Ricch; Zack Bia	12,805 / 12,805	$1,843,745
November 3	Portland	United States	Moda Center	Roddy Ricch; Zack Bia	13,123 / 13,123	$1,377,477
November 5	Seattle	United States	Climate Pledge Arena	Roddy Ricch; Zack Bia	14,159 / 14,159	$2,043,329
November 6	Vancouver	Canada	Rogers Arena	Smiley; Micky Weekes	13,632 / 13,632	$1,894,627
November 10	Inglewood (Note: Labeled as Los Angeles in promotional material.)	United States	The Forum	Roddy Ricch; Zack Bia	26,918 / 26,918	$3,091,880
November 11	Inglewood	United States	The Forum	Roddy Ricch; Zack Bia	26,918 / 26,918	$3,091,880
November 13	Paradise (Note: Labeled as Las Vegas in promotional material.)	United States	T-Mobile Arena	Roddy Ricch; Zack Bia	14,381 / 14,381	$2,392,925
November 15	Los Angeles	United States	Crypto.com Arena	Roddy Ricch; Zack Bia	—	—
November 16	Los Angeles	United States	Crypto.com Arena	Roddy Ricch; Zack Bia	—	—

List of 2023 concerts
Date (2023)	City	Country	Venue	Opening Act(s)	Attendance	Revenue
January 21 (Note: Concerts in New Zealand and Australia were performed as opening act of the Unlimited Love Tour by American rock band Red Hot Chili Peppers.)	Auckland	New Zealand	Mount Smart Stadium	—N/a	—	—
January 26	Dunedin	New Zealand	Forsyth Barr Stadium	—N/a	—	—
January 29	Brisbane	Australia	Suncorp Stadium	—N/a	—	—
February 2	Sydney	Australia	Accor Stadium	—N/a	—	—
February 4	Sydney	Australia	Accor Stadium	—N/a	—	—
February 7	Melbourne	Australia	Marvel Stadium	—N/a	—	—
February 9	Melbourne	Australia	Marvel Stadium	—N/a	—	—
February 12	Perth	Australia	Optus Stadium	—N/a	—	—
April 22	Oslo	Norway	Telenor Arena	Kamelen	—	—
April 25	Stockholm	Sweden	Avicii Arena	Rae Sremmurd	—	—
April 26	Copenhagen	Denmark	Royal Arena	Rae Sremmurd	—	—
April 28	Antwerp	Belgium	Sportpaleis	Rae Sremmurd	—	—
April 30	Zürich	Switzerland	Hallenstadion	Rae Sremmurd	—	—
May 1	Cologne	Germany	Lanxess Arena	Rae Sremmurd	—	—
May 4	London	England	The O_{2} Arena	Rae Sremmurd	—	—
May 6	London	England	The O_{2} Arena	Rae Sremmurd	—	—
May 7	London	England	The O_{2} Arena	Rae Sremmurd	—	—
May 9	Dublin	Ireland	3Arena	Rae Sremmurd	—	—
May 10	Dublin	Ireland	3Arena	Rae Sremmurd	—	—
May 13	Glasgow	Scotland	OVO Hydro	Rae Sremmurd	—	—
May 14	Birmingham	England	Resorts World Arena	Rae Sremmurd	—	—
May 16	Manchester	England	AO Arena	Rae Sremmurd	—	—
May 17	Manchester	England	AO Arena	Rae Sremmurd	—	—
May 19	Amsterdam	Netherlands	Ziggo Dome	Rae Sremmurd	—	—
May 20	Amsterdam	Netherlands	Ziggo Dome	Rae Sremmurd	—	—
Total					726,693 / 726,693	$93,739,349
