= Mann's World =

2011 studio album by Mann

Studio album by Mann
- Released: August 2, 2011
- Recorded: 2009–2011
- Genre: Hip hop; pop-rap
- Length: 28:54
- Label: Beluga Heights; Def Jam; Mercury
- Producer: J. R. Rotem, Fingazz, David D.A. Doman

Singles from Mann's World
- 1. "Text" Released: February 23, 2010; 2. "Buzzin'" Released: October 19, 2010; 3. "The Mack" Released: May 23, 2011

Mann's World is the debut studio album by American rapper Mann, released through Def Jam Recordings, Beluga Heights and Mercury Records on August 2, 2011. The album was preceded by the singles "Text", "Buzzin'" and "The Mack" which were released in April and October 2010, and in May 2011, respectively.

== Background and singles ==
On April 16, 2010, the first single "Text" featuring Jason Derulo was issued.

The second single from Mann's World, "Buzzin'", is based on producer J.R. Rotem's chopped 'n' screwed sample of the 1986 Nu Shooz pop/soul song "I Can't Wait" and Ohio Players' 1973 single "Funky Worm". It was released on October 25, 2010, and the song climbed into the Top 20 on Rhythmic stations across the nation and Top 10 in Los Angeles, Miami, Phoenix, Denver and more.

The third single, "The Mack" featuring Snoop Dogg and Iyaz, was released on May 23, 2011. Mann said prior to the release of the album: "this album is going to be a mixture between Chronic, 2001 and Graduation, I want nothing less than perfection".

== Track listing ==
No.	Title	Writer(s)	Producer(s)	Length
1.	"Mann's Intro"	Mann, J. R. Rotem	J. R. Rotem	0:41
2.	"Gold Herringbone"	Mann, J. R. Rotem, L. Haywood	J. R. Rotem	3:29
3.	"The Mack" (featuring Iyaz & Snoop Dogg)	Mann, Snoop Dogg, Keidran Jones, Mark Morrison,	J. R. Rotem	3:34
4.	"Buzzin' (Remix)" (featuring 50 Cent)	Mann, J. R. Rotem, C. Battey, S. Battey, J. Smith, 50 Cent	J. R. Rotem	3:44
5.	"Wanna Go Back"	Mann, J. R. Rotem, M. Landon, Jason Derülo, L. Caesar, J. Woloschuk	J. R. Rotem	3:30
6.	"Get It Girl" (featuring T-Pain)	Mann, T-Pain, J. R. Rotem, Claude Kelly, Theron M. Thomas, Timothy J. Thomas, M. James, H. Faltermeyer	J. R. Rotem	3:07
7.	"Reminisce" (featuring Ty Dolla $ign)	Mann, J. R. Rotem, T. Griffin, C. Battey, S. Battey, P. Phillips, C. Penn, M. Buchwald, P. Kanter	J. R. Rotem	3:27
8.	"Dance the Night Away"	Mann, J. Stary, S. Garrett	Fingazz	3:35
9.	"Shaded Up Chillin"	Mann, J. R. Rotem	J. R. Rotem	3:47
Total length:				28:54

iTunes Store bonus track
No.	Title	Writer(s)	Producer(s)	Length
10.	"Text" (featuring Jason Derulo)	Mann, Jason Derülo, David Doman	J. R. Rotem, David D.A. Doman	3:15

Notes

- The iTunes Store bonus track version contains the music videos for "Buzzin' (Remix)" and "The Mack".
- Track 2, "Gold Herringbone", contains elements of "Nuthin' but a 'G' Thang", as written and performed by Dr. Dre and Snoop Dogg.
- Track 4, "Buzzin' (Remix)", is based around samples of Nu Shooz' 1986 recording "I Can't Wait", written by John Smith.
- Track 3, "The Mack", is a cover version (featuring vocals from Snoop Dogg and Iyaz) of the original "Return of the Mack", as written and performed by Mark Morrison.
- Track 6, "Get It Girl", mostly samples the "Beverly Hills Cop theme", this song has also been sampled by producer J. R. Rotem for the song "Strobelight" by K-Young, and featured Mann. The song includes a sample of "Axel F", as produced by Harold Faltermeyer. The song also samples Family Guy's Peter Griffin for the line.
- Track 7, "Reminisce", samples the single "They Reminisce Over You (T.R.O.Y.)" by Pete Rock & CL Smooth. The Saxophone is played by Jason Goldman and features uncredited vocals by Ty$.

== Charts ==
Chart (2011)	Peak position
UK Album Chart	67
UK Digital Albums Chart	40
UK R&B Albums Chart	11

== Release history ==
Region	Date	Edition (Format)	Catalog	Label
United Kingdom	July 25, 2011	Standard edition (CD / digital download)		Island Def Jam
United States	August 9, 2011	Standard edition (CD / digital download)		Island Def Jam
