= Poolside =

Poolside may refer to:

- Poolside (band), a Los Angeles "Daytime Disco" band
- Poolside (album), 1986, by Nu Shooz
- Poolsuite, formerly Poolside FM, an Internet radio service
- Poolside AI, foundation model company
- The area surrounding a swimming pool
