= Innocent Man =

Innocent Man may refer to:

== Literature ==
- An Innocent Man, a 1988 novel by Sandra Kitt
- The Innocent Man: Murder and Injustice in a Small Town, a nonfiction book by John Grisham

== Film and TV ==
- An Innocent Man (film), a 1989 film directed by Peter Yates
- The Innocent Man (South Korean TV series), a 2012 television series
- The Innocent Man (2018 TV series), American docu-series on Netflix
- "An Innocent Man", a 1993 episode of Walker, Texas Ranger
- "An Innocent Man", a 1994 episode of Pie in the Sky
- "An Innocent Man", a 2004 episode of Jack & Bobby
- "An Innocent Man", a 2010 episode of The Deep End
- "An Innocent Man" (Arrow), a 2012 episode of Arrow
- "The Innocent Man", an episode of Boston Legal
- "He Kane Hewaʻole", unofficially translated as "An Innocent Man", an episode of Hawaii Five-0

== Music ==
=== Albums ===
- An Innocent Man, a 1983 album by Billy Joel
- Innocent Man, a 1993 album by Wayne Wade
- Innocent Man (Mark Morrison album), 2006

=== Songs ===
- "An Innocent Man" (song), a 1983 single by Billy Joel from the album An Innocent Man
- "Innocent Man", a song from the 1997 Sherrié Austin album Words
- "Innocent Man (Misunderstood)", a 2007 single by Cassidy
- "Innocent Man", a song from the 2017 Rag'n'Bone Man album Human
