= Return of the Mac (disambiguation) =

Return of the Mac is a 2007 album by American rapper Prodigy.

Return of the Mac may also refer to:

- Return of the Mac (TV series), a 2017 television series starring Joey McIntyre
- Return of the Mack (album), by Mark Morrison (1996)
  - "Return of the Mack", a single from the album
