= Point of No Return (Nu Shooz song) =

Single by Nu Shooz

from the album Poolside
- B-side: "Goin' Thru the Motions"
- Released: September 1986
- Recorded: 1986
- Genre: Freestyle, synthpop
- Length: 4:23 (album version); 3:34 (video version)
- Label: Atlantic
- Songwriters: John Smith, Valerie Day

Nu Shooz singles chronology
| "I Can't Wait" (1986) | "Point of No Return" (1986) | "Don't Let Me Be the One" (1986) |

Audio sample
- "Nu Shooz - Point Of No Return": file; help

"Point of No Return" is the title of the second single taken from the Nu Shooz album Poolside. The song spent one week at #1 on the Billboard Hot Dance Club Play chart in September 1986. It also peaked at #28 on the Billboard Hot 100 chart and #36 on the R&B chart in the U.S., as well as topping out at #48 on the UK singles chart. The song was mixed by Shep Pettibone.

== Music video ==
The music video features band member Valerie Day walking on the Hollywood Walk of Fame and entering a ballet studio, meeting up with her husband John Smith and opening a closet full of sneakers and dancing shoes animated with stop motion (including pixilation). Valerie and John start dancing themselves as well. The shoes also form the flags of United States, UK, France, and Canada. The video ends with Valerie and John walking in stop motion and pixilation with the shoes. The video was directed by Wayne Isham.

== Charts ==
| Chart (1986–1987) | Peak position |
|---|---|
| Canada Top Singles (RPM) | 23 |
| New Zealand (Recorded Music NZ) | 18 |
| Switzerland (Schweizer Hitparade) | 23 |
| UK Singles (Official Charts) | 48 |
| US Billboard Hot 100 | 28 |
| US Dance Club Songs (Billboard) | 1 |
| US Hot R&B/Hip-Hop Songs (Billboard) | 36 |
| West Germany (GfK) | 24 |

== See also ==
- List of number-one dance singles of 1986 (U.S.)
