= I Can't Wait (Nu Shooz song) =

1986 single by Nu Shooz

- Sleeve of 1986 US reissue

Single by Nu Shooz

from the album Tha's Right and Poolside
- B-side: "Make Your Mind Up"
- Released: February 1986
- Genre: Freestyle; pop; R&B
- Length: 5:25 (album version); 3:38 (single/dutch mix)
- Label: Atlantic
- Songwriter: John Smith
- Producers: John Smith; Rick Waritz

Nu Shooz singles chronology
"I Can't Wait" (1986)	"Point of No Return" (1986)

Music video
- "I Can't Wait" on YouTube

"I Can't Wait" is a song by American group Nu Shooz, included on the band's second album, Tha's Right (1985). The song was remixed by Dutch DJ and producer Peter Slaghuis: this remixed version is the one that appears on the group's 1986 album, Poolside.

In the United States, the remixed version of the song reached number one on the Billboard Dance/Disco Club Play chart and number three on the Billboard Hot 100. In the United Kingdom and West Germany, the song reached number two, while in Canada, it peaked at number one. The single returned to the Billboard charts in 2015, where it peaked at number 17 on the Dance/Electronic Digital Songs chart.

== Background ==
Instrumentalist John Smith would try to write songs in batches of 10 and have two a week ready for rehearsals in Portland, Oregon. He bought a new Teac-3440 4-track recorder in 1983, and "I Can't Wait" was one of the first songs he recorded on it. He scribbled out the lyrics in fifteen minutes as the band was loading up gear to go to rehearse it, and his wife, singer Valerie Day, approved.

== Critical reception ==
John Leland's writeup in a Spin magazine column wrote about the single, saying: "You can listen to this record as many times as you want and still not have any strong impressions that human beings actually made it. In other words, it's the perfect disco record."

== Music video ==
The music video was directed by Jim Blashfield. It contains animations and has a hint of the very surreal. The plot has Valerie Day singing the song sitting at a desk, repairing a coffeepot, while tools and other oddities pass into the frame and out again. Her dog sits nearby, wearing sunglasses.

== Personnel ==
Personnel are taken from the liner notes of the Tha's Right album.

- Valerie Day – lead vocals, congas, percussion
- John Smith – guitars
- Mark Bosnian – keyboards, vocals
- Danny Schauffler – tenor saxophone
- Lewis Livermore – trumpet
- Gary Fountaine – bass guitar
- Peter K. Williams – drums
- Shannon Day, Lori Lamphear-Rosenfeld – backing vocals
- Nate Phillips – Moog bass

== Charts ==
=== Weekly charts ===
Chart (1986)	Peak position
Australia (Kent Music Report)	11
Austria (Ö3 Austria Top 40)	16
Belgium (Ultratop 50 Flanders)	9
Canada Retail Singles (The Record)	2
Canada Top Singles (RPM)	1
Europe (European Hot 100 Singles)	6
France (SNEP)	24
Ireland (IRMA)	10
Netherlands (Dutch Top 40)	11
Netherlands (Single Top 100)	9
New Zealand (Recorded Music NZ)	3
Switzerland (Schweizer Hitparade)	4
UK Singles (Official Charts)	2
US Billboard Hot 100	3
US 12-inch Singles Sales (Billboard)	2
US Adult Contemporary (Billboard)	38
US Dance/Disco Club Play (Billboard)	1
US Hot Black Singles (Billboard)	2
West Germany (GfK)	2

=== Year-end charts ===
Chart (1986)	Rank
Australia (Kent Music Report)	66
Canada Top Singles (RPM)	9
Europe (European Hot 100 Singles)	29
Netherlands (Dutch Top 40)	95
New Zealand (RIANZ)	17
UK Singles (OCC)	38
US Billboard Hot 100	26
West Germany (Media Control)	23

== Certifications ==
Region	Certification	Certified units/sales
Canada (Music Canada)	Gold	50,000^{^}
United Kingdom (BPI)	Silver	250,000^{^}
United States (RIAA)	Gold	500,000^{^}
^{^} Shipments figures based on certification alone.

== Cover version and samples ==
- The song was covered in 2002 by the UK garage girl group Ladies First. It was a UK top 20 hit, reaching number 19.
- The song was sampled by American singer Vanessa Williams for her 1997 song "Happiness".
- The song was sampled by American rapper Mann for his 2010 song "Buzzin".
- French DJ and producer Bob Sinclar remixed the song in 2026, featuring vocals from Canadian singer Kiesza. It came out 40 years after the original, with a tempo increasing to 126 BPM.

== See also ==
- List of number-one dance hits (United States)
