= Twelve Carat Toothache =

Studio album by Post Malone
- Released: June 3, 2022
- Recorded: January 2020 – January 2022
- Studios: Crosby (Burbank); Electric Feel (West Hollywood); Germano; Jungle City (New York City); Gold Tooth Music (Beverly Hills); Miloco The Pool (United Kingdom); Sarm (London)
- Genres: Pop; hip-hop
- Length: 43:18
- Labels: Mercury; Republic
- Producers: Andrew Bolooki; Andrew Watt; Brian Lee; Bryvn; Charlie Handsome; Frankie XY; Hector Soundz; Jasper Harris; Louis Bell; Omer Fedi; Post Malone; Taurus

Post Malone chronology
Hollywood's Bleeding (2019)	Twelve Carat Toothache (2022)	The Diamond Collection (2023)

Singles from Twelve Carat Toothache
- 1. "One Right Now" Released: November 5, 2021; 2. "Cooped Up" Released: May 12, 2022; 3. "I Like You (A Happier Song)" Released: June 7, 2022

Twelve Carat Toothache is the fourth studio album by American musician Post Malone. It was released on June 3, 2022, by Mercury and Republic Records. The album contains 14 tracks and includes guest appearances from Roddy Ricch, Doja Cat, Gunna, Fleet Foxes, the Kid Laroi, and the Weeknd. The deluxe edition was later released on June 7, including two new tracks, "Waiting For Never" and "Hateful".

Twelve Carat Toothache was supported by three singles: "One Right Now", "Cooped Up", and "I Like You (A Happier Song)". The album received generally favorable reviews from critics. It debuted at number two on the US Billboard 200, earning 121,000 album-equivalent units in its first week. The album is Post Malone's fourth top-five album in the US.

== Background ==
On April 24, 2020, Post Malone announced that a new album is in progress during a live stream performance. On July 21, 2020, Malone was interviewed by The Wall Street Journal, in which he said:

To be honest, I think everyone in America is going a little bit crazy sitting at home all day. So I've gone a little bit crazy, and I wanted to take more steps outside of my comfort range and make music that I think – to me – is some of the best I've made. I probably say that every album cycle, but for me it feels so special. I want to make an album that will uplift and show that people are not alone in their times of loneliness and worry and that at the end of the day we all just need to show love to everyone on the planet and figure things out. So we're working pretty hard, and I think we're making some incredible stuff.

On April 23, 2021, his manager, Dre London, shared that he and Malone had agreed that he would release two projects in 2021, which however, did not happen. On January 10, 2022, London revealed that Twelve Carat Toothache had been completed and was ready to be released, but said that Republic Records and its parent label, Universal Music Group, had been delaying its release.

On January 26, 2022, Malone was interviewed by Billboard. He felt that the songs on the album "speak more to how I'm feeling at the moment: the ups and downs and the disarray and the bipolar aspect of being an artist in the mainstream". American record producer Louis Bell, a close friend and frequent collaborator of Malone, felt that it blends "molten lava and fire" and "cyan blues and whites". Due to the COVID-19 pandemic, Malone was unable to go on tour, which gave him less incentive to make as much music. The album contains 14 songs and runs for 43 minutes, making it Malone's shortest album to date. Malone announced two additional songs "Waiting for Never" and "Hateful" for release on June 7.

== Release and promotion ==
On April 11, 2022, Malone's manager Dre London announced via Instagram that the album would be released in May 2022. On April 23, 2022, Malone took to Instagram live, previewing some of the album's songs. Among those songs, he played "Love/Hate Letter to Alcohol", a collaboration with Fleet Foxes's Robin Pecknold, which details Post's' "struggle with alcohol". Malone said the band is one of his favorites, and praised Pecknold as "the most beautiful fucking vocalist". Post described "Wasting Angels", featuring the Kid Laroi, as being about "a celebration of life and a human spirit to be able to fight no matter what". He also previewed a song called "Wrapped Around Your Finger", as well as the Doja Cat-assisted "I Like You (A Happier Song)", which sees the two "playfully" going back and forth. On April 27, 2022, Malone announced that the album will be released on June 3, 2022. On May 14, 2022, he appeared as a musical guest on Saturday Night Live and performed "Cooped Up" with Roddy Ricch, as well as "Love/Hate Letter to Alcohol", joined by Fleet Foxes. Malone had previously confirmed that he had worked with Fleet Foxes frontman Robin Pecknold on a song for the album. Twelve Carat Toothache was released on June 3, 2022, through Mercury Records and Republic Records. The standard edition was released on cassette, CD, digital download, and streaming, with a pre-order for the vinyl release going live days later. The bonus tracks of deluxe edition, "Waiting for Never" and "Hateful", were released to streaming services on June 7, 2022.

=== Singles ===
On November 2, 2021, Malone and the Weeknd posted a 7-second snippet of the song titled "PM&TW-ORN-Update.5.nonhyped.w1.mp3" on their Instagram accounts. The post received over 150,000 likes in just an hour. While it was initially unknown what the title of the song was going to be, Malone's manager Dre London revealed that the collaboration would be titled "One Right Now". On November 5, 2021, Malone released "One Right Now" with the Weeknd, as the lead single from the album. The song marks the first time the artists appeared on a song together. The song was produced by Louis Bell, Brian Lee, and Andrew Bolooki. It debuted and peaked at number six on the Billboard Hot 100.

Malone released the album's second single, "Cooped Up" with Roddy Ricch, on May 12, 2022. It debuted and peaked at number 12 on the Billboard Hot 100.

"I Like You (A Happier Song)" featuring Doja Cat, was sent to US contemporary hit radio as the third single from the album on June 7, 2022. It debuted at number nine and peaked at number three on the Billboard Hot 100.

=== Tour ===
On June 13, 2022, to further promote the album, Post announced the North American leg of his upcoming concert tour, the Twelve Carat Tour, which was later extended to Europe. The tour began on September 10 in Omaha, Nebraska, and concluded on May 20, 2023 in Amsterdam, the Netherlands. Roddy Ricch and Rae Sremmurd joined as the opening acts on most North American and European dates, respectively.

== Critical reception ==
Professional ratings
Aggregate scores
Source	Rating
AnyDecentMusic?	5.6/10
Metacritic	68/100
Review scores
Source	Rating
AllMusic	3.5/5 stars
Beats Per Minute	65%
Clash	5/10
The Daily Telegraph	4/5 stars
Exclaim!	3/10
HipHopDX	2.5/5
MusicOMH	3/5 stars
NME	4/5 stars
Pitchfork	6.6/10
Rolling Stone	3.5/5 stars

According to the review aggregator Metacritic, Twelve Carat Toothache received "generally favorable reviews" based on a weighted average score of 68 out of 100 from fifteen critic scores. Aggregator AnyDecentMusic? gave it 5.6 out of 10, based on their assessment of the critical consensus.

Rhian Daly from NME enjoyed the album, saying, "The occasional outdated attitude and some light filler material here and there aside, Twelve Carat Toothache is another step up for Post Malone. It's a record that feels distinctively, inimitably him and succeeds in his goal of sharing his truth". Writing for The Daily Telegraph, Kathleen Johnston stated, "Despite what the polished sonics might suggest, Twelve Carat Toothache is an ambitious record with real range, proving that Post has found his groove as America's kaleidoscopic king of new-era pop". Jon Caramanica of The New York Times praised the album, stating, "Some of Post Malone's brightest sounds to date: "Wrapped Around Your Finger" has 1950s sweetness and 1980s syntheticness, and "I Cannot Be (a Sadder Song)" has a bubbly undertow that recalls some of the squeakiest K-pop. "One Right Now", with the Weeknd, is more zippy dyspepsia. But even the chirpy moments don't detract from the album's tonal consistency". In a positive review, Variety's Chris Willman said, "Twelve Carat Toothache finally feels like a transitional album for one of pop's biggest stars. (And we do mean pop, not hip-hop) ... But with no small help from Bell, who's the best kind of musical enabler, Malone's turns of melodic phrase and aptitude for true confessions are making him a far more interesting artist than we could have guessed even a couple of albums ago". AllMusic's Neil Z. Yeung wrote, "While the rap-preferring fans will still gravitate to his first two efforts, listeners with an appreciative ear for his genre-sampling maturation into the mainstream will find Twelve Carat Toothache to be a fascinating emotional exploration of a conflicted artist who can't help but churn out star-making hits at the expense of his own happiness". Maura Johnston of Rolling Stone said, "His fourth album is full of big-name cameos, sweeping gestures, and pensive vibes".

In his review, Matthew Strauss of Pitchfork states, "Post Malone's fourth studio album is slick, streamlined, and a little less vulgar and ostentatious than his earlier work—a sign that he's taking himself more seriously, for better or worse". Beats Per Minute critic JT Early said, "Don't let the sparkly façade fool you – Post isn't afraid to let you know he's just as much a human being, with all its accompanying messes and drama, as the rest of us". In a mixed review, Clash's Robin Murray stated, "Neither one thing or another, the lack of definition on the project results in something quietly rebellious, but curiously unsatisfying". Mackenzie Cummings-Grady of HipHopDX said, "Lukewarm contributions from Doja Cat, the Kid Laroi, Roddy Ricch and others can't help Post Malone get out of the quicksand. He continues to be pulled in an obvious direction of glitzy Hollywood stardom but instead, maintains a chokehold on comfortability". Reviewing the album for Consequence, Paolo Ragusa stated, "Twelve Carat Toothache feels thrown together and incomplete. Post Malone did himself a favor by limiting the run time of the LP, but if he's championing quality over quantity, the quality has to be more incisive, specific, vulnerable, and holistic".

== Commercial performance ==
Twelve Carat Toothache debuted at number two on the US Billboard 200 with 121,000 album-equivalent units, including 21,000 pure album sales. Its tracks earned a total of 127.82 million on-demand streams. The album is Post Malone's fourth top-five album in the US. Twelve Carat Toothache was the twenty-sixth best-selling album of the year according to Hits, still according to the magazine, the album has moved a total of 747,000 album-equivalent units by the end of 2022, including 51,000 pure album sales, 149,000 song sales, 872 million audio-on-demand streams, and 52 million video-on-demand streams.

== Track listing ==
Twelve Carat Toothache track listing
No.	Title	Writer(s)	Producer(s)	Length
1.	"Reputation"	Austin Post; Louis Bell	Bell	4:08
2.	"Cooped Up" (featuring Roddy Ricch)	Post; Rodrick Moore Jr.; Bell; Billy Walsh	Bell; Post Malone	3:05
3.	"Lemon Tree"	Post; Ryan Vojtesak; Bell; Walsh; Brian Lee	Charlie Handsome; Bell; Malone	4:03
4.	"Wrapped Around Your Finger"	Post; Bell; Andrew Watt; Omer Fedi; Walsh	Bell; Malone; Watt; Fedi	3:13
5.	"I Like You (A Happier Song)" (featuring Doja Cat)	Post; Amala Dlamini; Bell; Jasper Harris; Walsh	Bell; Harris	3:12
6.	"I Cannot Be (A Sadder Song)" (featuring Gunna)	Post; Sergio Kitchens; Bell; Taurus Currie Jr.; Walsh	Bell; Taurus	2:49
7.	"Insane"	Post; Bell; Walsh	Malone; Bell	2:49
8.	"Love/Hate Letter to Alcohol" (featuring Fleet Foxes)	Post; Bell; Robin Pecknold	Bell; Malone	3:03
9.	"Wasting Angels" (featuring the Kid Laroi)	Post; Charlton Howard; Bell; Walsh	Bell	4:03
10.	"Euthanasia"	Post; Bell	Bell; Malone	2:25
11.	"When I'm Alone"	Post; Bell; Walsh	Malone; Bell	3:15
12.	"Waiting for a Miracle"	Post; Bell	Malone; Bell	2:21
13.	"One Right Now" (with the Weeknd)	Post; Abel Tesfaye; Bell; Lee; Andrew Bolooki; Walsh	Bell; Lee; Bolooki	3:12
14.	"New Recording 12, Jan 3, 2020"	Post; Bell	Malone; Bell	1:32
Total length:				43:18

Deluxe edition bonus tracks
No.	Title	Writer(s)	Producer(s)	Length
15.	"Waiting for Never"	Post; Bell; Bryan Yepes; Francisco Bejar; Hector Garcia; Walsh; Jessica Foutz; Timothy Bloom	Bell; Bryvn; Frankie XY; Hector Soundz	3:16
16.	"Hateful"	Post; Bell; Yepes; Foutz	Malone; Bell; Bryvn	2:59
Total length:				49:33

Japan special edition bonus tracks
No.	Title	Writer(s)	Producer(s)	Length
1.	"Psycho" (featuring Ty Dolla Sign)	Post; Tyrone Griffin, Jr.; Bell; Rosen^{[b]}	Bell; Malone	3:41
2.	"Wow."	Post; Bell; Feeney; Walsh; Anthoine Walters	Bell; Frank Dukes	2:29
3.	"Saint-Tropez"	Post; Adam Feeney; Jahaan Sweet; Paimon Jahanbin; Nima Jahanbin; Bell; Walsh	Frank Dukes; Sweet; Wallis Lane	2:30
4.	"Circles"	Post; Bell; Feeney; Walsh; Gunesberk	Bell; Malone; Dukes	3:34
5.	"Mötley Crew"	Post; Kostov; Levin; Doman; Chikwendu; Bell	Bell; Doman	3:04
6.	"Better Now"	Post; Bell; Feeney; Walsh; Kaan Gunesberk	Bell; Dukes	3:50
7.	"I Fall Apart"	Post; Carlo Montagnese; William Walsh	Illangelo	3:43
8.	"Take What You Want" (featuring Ozzy Osbourne and Travis Scott)	Post; John Osbourne; Jacques Webster II; Bell; Watt; Walsh	Bell; Watt	3:49
9.	"Sunflower" (with Swae Lee)	Post; Khalif Brown; Bell; Carter Lang; Walsh	Bell; Lang	2:38
10.	"Rockstar" (featuring 21 Savage)	Post; Shayaa Abraham-Joseph; Olufunmibi Awoshiley; Bell; Jo-Vaughn Virginie^{[b]}; Rosen^{[b]}	Bell; Tank God	3:38
11.	"Congratulations" (featuring Quavo)	Post; Quavious Marshall; Leland Wayne; Adam Feeney; Carl Rosen	Metro Boomin; Frank Dukes; Bell^{[a]}	3:40

== Personnel ==
Musicians

- Post Malone – vocals (all tracks), drums (2), programming (3, 7, 8, 10–12, 14, 16), bass (4), acoustic guitar (8)
- Louis Bell – programming (1–16), drums (2, 8, 13); keyboards, synthesizer (8, 13); bass (8), choir arrangement (9); synth bass, synth pads (13)
- Charlie Handsome – programming (3)
- Brian Lee – violin (3), programming (13)
- Andrew Watt – guitar (4)
- Omer Fedi – guitar (4)
- Jasper Harris – programming (5)
- Doja Cat – vocals (5)
- Gunna – rap vocals (6)
- Robin Pecknold – acoustic guitar (8)
- Dana Nielsen – background vocals, choir arrangement (9)
- Charissa Nielsen – background vocals (9)
- India Carney – background vocals (9)
- Jonathan Mouton – background vocals (9)
- The Kid Laroi – rap vocals (9)
- The Weeknd – vocals (13)
- Andrew Bolooki – programming, synthesizer (13)
- Taurus – programming (6)
- Bryvn – programming (15, 16)
- Frankie XY – programming (15)
- Hector Soundz – programming (15)

Technical

- Mike Bozzi – mastering (1–16)
- Manny Marroquin – mixing (1–13)
- Louis Bell – mixing (14–16), engineering (1–16), vocal production (all tracks), editing (14)
- Chris Dennis – engineering (1–6, 8–10, 12)
- Nick McMullen – engineering (1, 3, 10, 15, 16)
- Andrew Bolooki – engineering (5)
- Post Malone – engineering (14)
- Anthony Vilchis – mixing assistance (1–12)
- Chris Galland – mixing assistance (1–12)
- Trey Station – mixing assistance (1–12)
- Zach Pereyra – mixing assistance (1–12)
- Elijah Ibarra – engineering assistance (1, 5)
- Christian Amadeus – engineering assistance (2, 4, 7)
- Shane Moloney – engineering assistance (3, 4, 7)
- Mate Gere – engineering assistance (5, 9)
- Joey Mora – engineering assistance (7)

== Charts ==
=== Weekly charts ===
Weekly chart performance for Twelve Carat Toothache
Chart (2022)	Peak position
Australian Albums (ARIA)	2
Australian Hip Hop/R&B Albums (ARIA)	1
Austrian Albums (Ö3 Austria)	6
Belgian Albums (Ultratop Flanders)	7
Belgian Albums (Ultratop Wallonia)	17
Canadian Albums (Billboard)	1
Czech Albums (ČNS IFPI)	8
Danish Albums (Hitlisten)	2
Dutch Albums (Album Top 100)	2
Finnish Albums (Suomen virallinen lista)	4
French Albums (SNEP)	27
German Albums (Offizielle Top 100)	10
Irish Albums (IRMA)	3
Italian Albums (FIMI)	11
Japanese Hot Albums (Billboard Japan)	89
Lithuanian Albums (AGATA)	6
New Zealand Albums (RMNZ)	2
Norwegian Albums (VG-lista)	1
Polish Albums (ZPAV)	32
Portuguese Albums (AFP)	34
Scottish Albums (Official Charts)	49
Slovak Albums (IFPI)	2
Spanish Albums (Promusicae)	11
Swedish Albums (Sverigetopplistan)	3
Swiss Albums (Schweizer Hitparade)	6
UK Albums (Official Charts)	3
UK R&B Albums (Official Charts)	2
US Billboard 200	2
US Top R&B/Hip-Hop Albums (Billboard)	1

=== Year-end charts ===
2022 year-end chart performance for Twelve Carat Toothache
Chart (2022)	Position
Australian Albums (ARIA)	65
Belgian Albums (Ultratop Flanders)	198
Canadian Albums (Billboard)	36
Danish Albums (Hitlisten)	45
Dutch Albums (Album Top 100)	84
Lithuanian Albums (AGATA)	75
New Zealand Albums (RMNZ)	48
Swedish Albums (Sverigetopplistan)	84
US Billboard 200	63
US Top R&B/Hip-Hop Albums (Billboard)	27

2023 year-end chart performance for Twelve Carat Toothache
Chart (2023)	Position
US Billboard 200	138
US Top R&B/Hip-Hop Albums (Billboard)	82

== Certifications ==
Certifications for Twelve Carat Toothache
Region	Certification	Certified units/sales
Australia (ARIA)	Gold	35,000^{‡}
Belgium (BRMA)	Gold	10,000^{‡}
Canada (Music Canada)	Platinum	80,000^{‡}
Denmark (IFPI Danmark)	Platinum	20,000^{‡}
New Zealand (RMNZ)	Platinum	15,000^{‡}
Poland (ZPAV)	Gold	10,000^{‡}
Sweden (GLF)	Gold	15,000^{‡}
United Kingdom (BPI)	Gold	100,000^{‡}
^{‡} Sales+streaming figures based on certification alone.

== Release history ==
Release dates and formats for Twelve Carat Toothache
Region	Date	Label(s)	Format(s)	Edition	Ref.
Various	June 3, 2022	Mercury; Republic	CD; digital download; streaming	Standard	
Various	June 7, 2022	Mercury; Republic	Digital download; streaming	Deluxe	
Various	June 24, 2022	Mercury; Republic	Cassette	Standard	
Various	February 10, 2023	Mercury; Republic	Vinyl	Standard	
