= Poolside (album) =

Studio album by Nu Shooz
- Released: May 9, 1986
- Recorded: January–March 1986
- Studios: Sunset Sound Factory (Los Angeles, CA); Atlantic Studios (New York, NY); Lorber Studio (Los Angeles, CA); Cascade Recording (Portland, OR); Spectrum Studios (Portland, OR)
- Genres: Latin freestyle; synth-pop
- Length: 36:59
- Labels: Atlantic; 81647
- Producers: John Smith; Rick Waritz

Nu Shooz chronology
Tha's Right (1985)	Poolside (1986)	Told U So (1988)

Singles from Poolside
- 1. "I Can't Wait" Released: January 20, 1986; 2. "Point of No Return" Released: June 1986

Professional ratings
Review scores
Source	Rating
AllMusic	4.5/5 stars

Poolside is the third studio album by the American pop–Latin freestyle–electronic dance music duo Nu Shooz. It was released on May 9, 1986, through Atlantic Recording Corporation. Recording sessions took place at Sunset Sound Factory and Lorber Studio in Los Angeles, Atlantic Studios in New York, Cascade Recording and Spectrum Studios in Portland. Production was handled by John Smith and Rick Waritz, with Jeff Lorber, Marlon McClain and Shep Pettibone serving as associate producers.

At the time, the band was creating music in both the synthpop and freestyle genres. It was the band's first major-label release (an earlier album, Can't Turn It Off, was released by the Nebula Circle label in 1982 and a not-heavily promoted EP, Tha's Right was released in 1985), and it was responsible for its breakthrough on the pop and dance charts in both the United States and the United Kingdom.

The album peaked number 16 in Canada, number 23 in Switzerland, number 25 in New Zealand, number 27 on the US Billboard 200, number 30 in Germany, number 32 in the UK Albums Chart, and number 79 in Australia. It was certified Gold by the Recording Industry Association of America on October 2, 1986, for sales of over 500,000 units in the United States. It also reached Gold certification by Canadian Recording Industry Association on November 6, 1986, selling over 50,000 copies in Canada.

The album spawned two singles: "I Can't Wait", and "Point of No Return". Its lead single, "I Can't Wait", became the group's most successful song, topping the RPM 100 Singles chart and reaching top ten in Germany, the UK, New Zealand, the US, Switzerland, the Netherlands, and number 11 in Australia. The song was certified Silver by British Phonographic Industry and Gold by Music Canada and the RIAA. It was also featured in films (Son of Rambow, You Don't Mess with the Zohan, Hot Tub Time Machine, The Dirt), TV series (Entourage, The Cleveland Show, Young Rock), and video games (Grand Theft Auto: Episodes from Liberty City). The single "Point of No Return" made it to No. 18 in New Zealand, No. 23 in Canada and Switzerland, No. 24 in Germany, No. 28 in the US, and No. 48 in the UK. It was used in the 1987 film Campus Man.

== Track listing ==
All songs written by John Smith, except where noted.

No.	Title	Writer(s)	Length
1.	"Lost Your Number"		5:43
2.	"I Can't Wait"		5:25
3.	"Don't Let Me Be the One"		4:23
4.	"Goin' Thru the Motions"	Smith; Valerie Day	4:01
5.	"You Put Me in a Trance"	Smith; Catón Lyles	4:20
6.	"Point of No Return"	Smith; Day	4:23
7.	"Secret Message"	Smith; Jeff Lorber; Lewis Livermore	3:30
8.	"Don't You Be Afraid"		5:14
Total length:			36:59

== Personnel ==
Nu Shooz

- Valerie Day – vocals, percussion
- John Smith – keyboards, guitars, producer, arrangements

Instrumentalists

- Shannon Day – backing vocals
- Lori Lamphear – backing vocals (track 2)
- Jeff Lorber – keyboards, associate producer, additional rhythm arrangements
- Ron Regan – keyboards, saxophone
- Steve Reid – keyboards
- Gary Fountaine – bass
- Nathaniel Phillips – bass
- Marty Higgins – drums
- Danny Schauffler – saxophone (track 2)
- Lewis Livermore – trumpet

Technical

- Rick Waritz – producer, arrangements, management
- Marion McClain – associate producer
- Shep Pettibone – associate producer, mixing (tracks: 1, 3, 6)
- Tchad Blake – engineer
- Ellen Fitton – engineer
- Mike Moore – engineer, mix down engineer
- Fritz Richmond – engineer
- Jim Rodgers – engineer
- Stephen Shelton – engineer
- Bobby Warner – engineer
- Joe Arlotta – mix down engineer
- Jay Mark – mix down engineer
- Andy Wallace – mix down engineer
- Peter Slaghuis – mixing (track 2)
- Freddy Batsone – mixing (tracks: 4, 7)
- Timmy Regisford – mixing (tracks: 5, 8)
- Dennis King – LP mastering
- Barry Diament – CD mastering
- Bob Defrin – art direction, design
- Javier Romero – cover illustration

== Charts ==
=== Weekly charts ===
Weekly chart performance for "Poolside"
Chart (1986)	Peak position
Australian Albums (Kent Music Report)	79
Canada Top Albums/CDs (RPM)	16
German Albums (Offizielle Top 100)	30
New Zealand Albums (RMNZ)	25
Swiss Albums (Schweizer Hitparade)	23
UK Albums (Official Charts)	32
US Billboard 200	27

=== Year-end charts ===
Year end chart performance for "Poolside"
Chart (1986)	Position
Canada Top Albums/CDs (RPM)	75
US Billboard 200	90

=== Singles ===
Year	Title	Peak chart positions										Certifications
Year	Title	US	US R&B	US Dan	AUS	CAN	GER	NLD	NZ	SWI	UK	Certifications
1986	"I Can't Wait"	3	2	1	11	1	2	9	3	4	2	BPI: Silver; MC: Gold; RIAA: Gold
1986	"Point of No Return"	28	36	1	—	23	24	—	18	23	48	
1986	"—" denotes a recording that did not chart or was not released in that territory.											

== Certifications ==
Region	Certification	Certified units/sales
Canada (Music Canada)	Gold	50,000^{^}
United States (RIAA)	Gold	500,000^{^}
^{^} Shipments figures based on certification alone.
