= Buzzin' (Mann song) =

Single by Mann

from the album Mann's World
- Released: October 25, 2010
- Recorded: 2010
- Genre: Hip-hop
- Length: 3:16 (original); 3:44 (feat. 50 Cent)
- Label: Beluga Heights; Def Jam
- Songwriters: Mann; J.R. Rotem; The Jackie Boyz; 50 Cent
- Producer: J.R. Rotem

Mann singles chronology
"Text" (2010)	"Buzzin'" (2010)	"The Mack" (2011)

50 Cent singles chronology
"Here We Go Again" (2010)	"Buzzin" (2011)	"Haters" (2011)

Music video
- "Buzzin'" on YouTube

"Buzzin'" is a song by the American hip-hop artist Mann. Written by Mann, the Jackie Boyz and J.R. Rotem and produced by the latter, the song was released as a single on October 25, 2010, as the second single from Mann's debut album Mann's World. "Buzzin'" is built on samples of Nu Shooz' 1986 recording "I Can't Wait", written by John Smith. The official remix of the song, featuring rapper 50 Cent, was released as a single on December 21, 2010.

== Music video ==
The music video (directed by Jessy Terrero) was released to YouTube on December 23, 2010. with cameo appearances from Nipsey Hussle. The music video on YouTube has received over 35 million views as of April 2024.

== Chart performance ==
The song marked Mann's first appearance on the Billboard Hot 100 when it debuted at number 95 on the week ending 29 January 2011, and peaked at number 61. The song debuted at number 112 on the UK Singles Chart on the week ending March 12, 2011, and peaked at number 6.

Chart (2011)	Peak position
German Youth Airplay Chart	17
Ireland (IRMA)	20
Latvia (European Hit Radio)	38
Scottish Singles Sales (Official Charts)	8
UK Singles (Official Charts)	6
UK Hip Hop/R&B (Official Charts)	2
US Billboard Hot 100	61
US Hot R&B/Hip-Hop Songs (Billboard)	70
US Hot Rap Songs (Billboard)	13
US Pop Songs (Billboard)	39
US Heatseekers Songs (Billboard)	1

== Release history ==
Release dates and formats for "Buzzin'"
Region	Date	Format	Label(s)	Ref.
United States	November 16, 2010	Mainstream airplay	Mercury	
