= Nu Shooz =

American band

- Origin: Portland, Oregon, U.S.
- Genre: Freestyle, R&B, new wave, pop, soul
- Years active: 1979–2019
- Labels: Atlantic; Poolside
- Members: John Smith; Valerie Day
- Website: www.nushoozmusic.com

Nu Shooz is an American R&B group fronted by the husband-and-wife team of John Smith and Valerie Day, based in Portland, Oregon. Nu Shooz released four albums in the U.S. during the 1980s. Poolside, their third album, brought the group's sound to a wider audience.

== Career ==
Nu Shooz formed in 1979 in a lineup that originally featured twelve members. This incarnation of the group released its debut album Can't Turn It Off in 1982. Although the album saw limited success, the band continued on, reducing its lineup to seven members over the next several years.

Nu Shooz originally released the single "I Can't Wait" in Portland in April 1985 on Poolside Records. The original session occurred at Cascade Recording in Portland in the fall of 1984 and was also featured on the band's sparsely distributed second album, Tha's Right, in 1985. "I Can't Wait" became popular on Portland radio stations at that time, but Nu Shooz was turned down by every major label. A copy of the song made it to the Netherlands, where it was remixed by Peter Slaghuis. This version is known as the 'Dutch Mix.' The remix came back into the United States as an import on Dutch label Injection Records. This version got the attention of Atlantic Records, which signed the band to a contract in January 1986.

Nu Shooz scored two major hits. "I Can't Wait" climbed to No. 2 on the R&B charts and No. 3 on the Billboard Hot 100 chart in June 1986 and spent fifteen weeks in the Top 40, and it also hit No. 1 on the Hot Dance Club Play chart earlier that year. Its follow-up, "Point of No Return," was remixed by Shep Pettibone and topped the dance chart in September 1986; the song peaked at No. 28 on the Hot 100 and No. 35 on the R&B chart. Both singles were on the album Poolside, which charted on Billboard's 200 chart at No. 27, and sold 500,000 copies in the U.S., garnering gold record RIAA certification on October 2, 1986.

In 1987, Nu Shooz was nominated for a Grammy Award in the Best New Artist category, based on its breakthrough success the previous year. In 1988, the band released the album Told U So, which had its final chart entries to date: "Should I Say Yes?" hit No. 17 on the R&B chart and No. 41 on the Hot 100, and the track "Are You Lookin' for Somebody Nu" topped out at No. 2 on the dance chart. The album peaked at No. 93 on the Billboard 200. "Time Will Tell" was supposed to be the first single from the third album for Atlantic, which was titled Eat & Run, but the album was never released.

In 2007, Nu Shooz was inducted into the Oregon Music Hall of Fame. Also that year, Smith and Day formed a spin-off band called Nu Shooz Orchestra with a sound they called "Jazz-Pop-Cinema." They released one album, Pandora's Box, in 2010 along with music videos for the songs "Spy vs Spy" (directed by Mike Wellins) and "Right Before My Eyes" (animated by Smith and Day’s son Malcolm Smith.) The following year, "I Can't Wait" was sampled in the hit song "Buzzin'" by Mann.

In 2012, the band released Kung Pao Kitchen, a return to their '80s roots. A year later, they got their live group back together for the first time in twenty years and joined the '80s-era tour Super Freestyle Explosion. A cover of "I Can't Wait", performed by Icona Pop and produced by Questlove, was used in a 2015 series of Target commercials.

Nu Shooz continued to record and perform through the 2010s, releasing their album Bagtown in 2016. In 2019, Nu Shooz retired from performing to pursue solo ventures.

== Discography ==
=== Studio albums ===
Year	Album details	Peak chart positions									Certifications
Year	Album details	US	US R&B	AUS	CAN	GER	NLD	NZ	SWI	UK	Certifications
1982	Can't Turn It Off: Release date: 1982; Label: Nebula Circle	—	—	—	—	—	—	—	—	—	
1985	Tha's Right: Release date: March 1, 1985; Label: Poolside	—	—	—	—	—	—	—	—	—	
1986	Poolside: Release date: May 5, 1986; Label: Atlantic	27	18	79	16	30	—	25	23	32	US: Gold; CAN: Gold
1988	Told U So: Release date: March 28, 1988; Label: Atlantic	93	49	—	—	—	72	—	—	—	
2010	Pandora's Box: Release date: June 10, 2010; Label: NSO Music	—	—	—	—	—	—	—	—	—	
2012	Kung Pao Kitchen: Release date: June 28, 2012; Label: NSO Music	—	—	—	—	—	—	—	—	—	
2016	Bagtown: Release date: May 21, 2016; Label: NSO Music	—	—	—	—	—	—	—	—	—	
"—" denotes a recording that did not chart or was not released in that territory.

=== Singles ===
Year	Title	Peak chart positions										Certifications	Album
Year	Title	US	US Dan	US R&B	AUS	CAN	GER	NLD	NZ	SWI	UK	Certifications	Album
1985	"I Can't Wait"	—	—	—	—	—	—	—	—	—	—		Tha's Right
1985	"Goin' Too Far"	—	—	—	—	—	—	—	—	—	—		Tha's Right
1986	"I Can't Wait" (remix)	3	1	2	11	1	2	9	3	4	2	US: Gold; CAN: Gold; UK: Silver	Poolside
1986	"Point of No Return"	28	1	36	—	23	24	—	18	23	48		Poolside
1986	"Don't Let Me Be the One"	—	39	—	—	—	—	—	—	—	—		Poolside
1988	"Should I Say Yes"	41	—	17	—	—	—	83	—	—	—		Told U So
1988	"Are You Lookin' for Somebody Nu"	—	2	—	—	—	—	—	—	—	—		Told U So
1988	"Driftin'"	—	—	—	—	—	—	—	—	—	—		Told U So
1992	"Time Will Tell"	—	—	—	—	—	—	—	—	—	—		Eat & Run (Unreleased)
"—" denotes a recording that did not chart or was not released in that territory.

=== Other releases ===
- Nu Shooz: Then and Now DVD (NSO Music LLC, 2006)

== See also ==
- List of number-one dance hits (United States)
- List of artists who reached number one on the US Dance chart
- List of one-hit wonders in the United States
- Music of Oregon

== Other sources ==
- The Billboard Book of Top 40 Hits, 6th Edition - 1996 - BPI Communications - ISBN 978-0823076321
