= Horny (Mark Morrison song) =

1996 single by Mark Morrison

Single by Mark Morrison

from the album Return of the Mack
- Released: 19 December 1996
- Genre: R&B
- Length: 3:34
- Label: Atlantic
- Songwriters: M. Morrison, P. Chill
- Producers: M. Morrison, P. Chill, Cutfather & Joe

Mark Morrison singles chronology
"Trippin'" (1996)	"Horny" (1996)	"Moan and Groan" (1997)

"Horny" is a song by British R&B musician Mark Morrison. It was released in December 1996 as the sixth single from his debut album, Return of the Mack. The song features guest rap vocals by Q-Tee and peaked at number five on the UK Singles Chart. The song also contains an uncredited sample of "Encore" by Cheryl Lynn.

== Critical reception ==
A reviewer from Music Week rated the song four out of five, writing, "Not the most commercial track from Return Of The Mack, but easily the most funky, this streetwise single sounds stronger the more spins it gets."

== Track listings ==
CD1:

1. "Horny (C&J Radio Edit)"
2. "Horny (D-Influence Slick Mix)"
3. "Horny (Mindspell Vocal Beatdown Mix)"
4. "Horny (Album Version)"

CD2:

1. "Horny (C&J Extended Mix)"
2. "Horny (Mack Edit)"
3. "Return of the Mack (C&J Radio Edit)"
4. "Candy (featuring Daddy Wattsie)"

== Charts ==
=== Weekly charts ===
Chart (1996–1997)	Peak position
Finland (Suomen virallinen lista)	14
Germany (Media Control)	92
Netherlands (Dutch Top 40 Tipparade)	17
Netherlands (Single Top 100)	79
New Zealand (RIANZ)	45
Scotland (OCC)	24
Sweden (Topplistan)	30
UK Singles (OCC)	5
UK Hip Hop/R&B (Official Charts)	1

=== Year-end charts ===
Chart (1997)	Position
UK Singles (OCC)	160
