= Innocent Man (Misunderstood) =

Single by Cassidy featuring Mark Morrison

from the album B.A.R.S. The Barry Adrian Reese Story
- Released: September 18, 2007
- Genre: Hip hop
- Length: 4:12
- Label: Full Surface, J Records, Epic Records
- Songwriters: Barry Adrian Reese, Kaseem Dean, Mark Morrison
- Producers: Swizz Beatz, The Individualz

Cassidy singles chronology
"My Drink n My 2 Step" (2007)	"Innocent Man (Misunderstood)" (2007)	"Drumma Bass" (2010)

Mark Morrison singles chronology
"Dance 4 Me" (2007)	"Innocent Man (Misunderstood)" (2007)	"Innocent Man (Remix EP)" (2008)

"Innocent Man (Misunderstood)" is a song by American hip hop recording artist Cassidy. It was officially released on September 18, 2007 as the second single from his third studio album, B.A.R.S. The Barry Adrian Reese Story (2007). The song, which was produced by Cassidy's longtime mentor and frequent collaborator Swizz Beatz, features vocals from English R&B singer Mark Morrison, sampling his song "Innocent Man".

== Background ==
In an interview with FMQB Radio, Cassidy gave insight on the song:

'Innocent Man' is talking about the situation I went through when I was locked up for the murder and two attempts, It talks about what I was going through and how I was feeling before it happened, after it happened, and how I feel now. I think it says a lot, and it tells you a lot about me. It's definitely going to be my second single because it brings my story to light. And this is what the album is based on — the Barry Reese story. I wanted to tell my story, my real life story, not just about being an entertainer, but the story about [being] Barry Reese.

== Charts ==
Chart (2007)	Peak position
US Bubbling Under Hot 100 Singles (Billboard)	3
