= I Am What I Am (Mark Morrison EP) =

EP by Mark Morrison
- Released: 7 July 2014
- Recorded: 2010–2013
- Genre: Hip hop; R&B
- Length: 28.03
- Label: MackLife Records
- Producer: Mark Morrison

Mark Morrison chronology
| Innocent Man (2006) | I Am What I Am (2014) |

Singles from I Am What I Am
- 1. "N.A.N.G. 2.0" Released: 20 October 2013

I Am What I Am is the second extended play by English hip hop and R&B musical recording artist Mark Morrison. It was released in the United Kingdom on MackLife Records on 7 July 2014. The EP has received mixed to positive reviews from critics.

== Background ==
Recording started in 2010, and the EP was also first announced in 2010.

A music video for N.A.N.G. 2.0 was uploaded to YouTube on 21 October 2013 at a total of four minutes and 9 seconds. To coincide with the songs and video theme, it was released in October, which is National Domestic Violence Awareness Month (in United States). The video was premiered by KarenCivil.com.

A music video for the title track I Am What I Am was uploaded to YouTube on 12 May 2014 at a total of two minutes and 54 seconds. The video premiered on Vice Noisey.

== Reception ==
Musiceyz.co.uk wrote "Mark's voice is heavily treated making him sound a bit too synthed and computerized." Jonny Abrams of Rocksucker gave a negative review of I Am What I Am, feeling that "It might have gotten away with it had the song itself not been so listless", naming it one of the week's worst singles.

"I Am What I Am" (Mark Sparks Remix), which featured American rapper and Slaughterhouse member Crooked I, debuted on the SingersRoom.com website on 16 May 2013. It became the number 1 most played single that week, on the website's IndieRotation Singles Chart. The song was supported by Vibe, who added it to their V-Playlist and reviewed the track saying "It's been a while since we've heard from Mr. Morrison. However, his new soulful track has been worth the wait". DJBooth.net rated the Mark Sparks remix of "I Am What I Am" 4 out of 5 stars, with a positive review calling it an "anthemic cut, expanding the original’s aural palette with 808s, swirling synths and a brand new chopped-n-screwed outro". DJ Blaze of DJBooth also commented "This beat by Mark Sparks is tough and Mark Morrison ripped this. Good feature by Crooked I. Banger!"

== Track listing ==
All tracks written by Mark Morrison.

| No. | Title | Length |
|---|---|---|
| 1. | "I Am What I Am" | 2:54 |
| 2. | "N.A.N.G. 2.0" (featuring Crooked I and Shonie) | 4:03 |
| 3. | "My Life" | 3:28 |
| 4. | "Wanna Be Your Man 2.0" (featuring Young Buck and K.O. McCoy) | 4:26 |
| 5. | "Father Forgive Them" (featuring Trae tha Truth, Keith Murray, Black Rob, Crooked I and Beenie Man) | 5:00 |
| 6. | "I Don't Want 2 Die" (featuring DMX) | 4:25 |
| 7. | "I Am What I Am" (Remix) | 3:43 |
