= Poolsuite =

Internet radio service

- Former name: Poolside.FM
- Website type: Music streaming
- Available in: English
- Founded: 2014; 12 years ago
- Founder: Marty Bell
- Website: https://poolsuite.net
- Native clients on: Android; iOS; macOS; visionOS

Poolsuite, formerly Poolside.FM, is an Internet radio service primarily playing dance-pop music using a retro style user interface. The team behind Poolsuite has also launched Vacation, a line of sunscreen, and Manor DAO, a decentralized autonomous organization funded through sales of non-fungible tokens (NFT).

== Internet radio ==
Poolsuite began as Poolside.FM in 2014, when founder Marty Bell launched an upbeat 1980s music Tumblr site, streaming music from SoundCloud. Bell was, at the time, living with his parents in the Scottish Highlands, and sought an escape from the rainy Scottish climate. In collaboration with Grant MacLennan, Bell in 2019 relaunched Poolside as a standalone web site, using a Classic Mac OS-styled desktop environment to play 1980s music and video loops of 1980s and 1990s television and movie clips. The company released an iOS mobile app in 2020, styled like a Nokia 3310 mobile phone.

The Internet radio service received generally good reviews. "The two-man team behind Poolside.FM has done a fantastic job at ensuring that the songs match the videos, creating an overall experience that drips teenage dreams and summer heat," wrote a reviewer for The Verge, with the caveat that the scantily-clad women make the site potentially not safe for work. "This free and playful music app born from a passion project with friends will fix your frame of mind on frivolity and irreverence, especially when paired with its nostalgically campy social media channels and website," wrote a reviewer for Charleston Grit, endorsing the service as particularly enticing during the COVID-19 pandemic.

== Sunscreen ==
In April 2021, Bell announced "Vacation by Poolside FM", a "leisure-enhancing sunscreen", in collaboration with entrepreneurs Lach Hall and Dakota Green. The group raised funding using a 42-page pitch "novella," with 1980s-themed imagery, and attracted angel investors including Kat Cole, Trevor McFedries, and Maisie Williams, and venture capitalists such as Brand Foundry Ventures and BFG Partners.

Vacation positioned its sunscreen as a premium product line with advertising inspired by vintage Club Med ads that emphasized leisure rather than medical benefits. The company sells additional products under the Vacation brand, including a $60 eau de toilette that was frequently out of stock, and a perpetually "sold out" hovercraft. The product's scent was created in collaboration with perfumers Carlos Huber and Rodrigo Flores-Roux.

== Event space ==
In 2022, Poolsuite announced Manor DAO, a decentralized autonomous organization that intended to buy a villa and use it to host events. The project cited Il Pelicano in Italy and Chateau Marmont in Los Angeles as aesthetic inspirations. Bell announced that Manor DAO would be funded by limited edition non-fungible tokens (NFT). NFT holders would have influence over the manor's location and decoration, and would be allowed to stay at its guest house.
