= One Right Now =

2021 single by Post Malone and The Weeknd

Single by Post Malone and the Weeknd

from the album Twelve Carat Toothache
- Released: November 5, 2021
- Genre: Electro-funk; electropop; synth-pop
- Length: 3:13
- Label: Republic
- Songwriters: Austin Post; Abel Tesfaye; Andrew Bolooki; William Walsh; Brian Lee; Louis Bell; Andre Jackson
- Producers: Louis Bell; Brian Lee; Andrew Bolooki

Post Malone singles chronology
"Motley Crew" (2021)	"One Right Now" (2021)	"Cooped Up" (2022)

The Weeknd singles chronology
"Moth to a Flame" (2021)	"One Right Now" (2021)	"La Fama" (2021)

Music video
- "One Right Now" on YouTube

"One Right Now" is a song by American musician Post Malone and Canadian singer the Weeknd. It was released through Republic Records on November 5, 2021, as the lead single from Malone's fourth studio album, Twelve Carat Toothache (2022). The artists wrote the song with Billy Walsh and producers Louis Bell, Brian Lee, and Andrew Bolooki. Musically, the style of "One Right Now" has been described as electro-funk and synth-pop.

== Background ==
The Weeknd initially wrote and recorded the song during recording sessions for his fourth studio album, After Hours. Although it wasn't included on the record, an 11-second snippet of the demo was leaked online in December 2020. On November 2, 2021, Post Malone and the Weeknd posted a 7-second snippet of the song titled "PM&TW-ORN-Update.5.nonhyped.w1.mp3" on their Instagram accounts. The post received over 150,000 likes in one hour. It was initially unknown what the title of the collaboration would be until Malone's manager Dre London revealed the title "One Right Now". The song marks the first time the artists appeared on a song together.

== Composition ==
"One Right Now" is an electropop and emo-influenced electro-funk, robo-funk, and synth-pop song that is set in the key of D♭ major. Based on the teaser, the sound was described as "a synthy midtempo club track". It sees the two "harmonizing over an upbeat instrumental". Writing for Billboard, Starr Bowenbank referred to the instrumental as a "poppy synth beat". Alex Zidel of HotNewHipHop predicted that the song will "dominate the radio for the remainder of the year, and likely well into next". For the radio version, The Weeknd replaced his lyric censors from the official clean version with the newly recorded lyrics "You think it's so easy messin' with my feelings" and "You probably slap all my enemies". Post Malone left his lyric censors as they were. They both sang "That you told me that he fucked you on" twice, separate then together, and tying to Post Malone's record label, it was also left censored.

== Music video ==
The music video for "One Right Now", directed by Tanu Muino, was released on November 15, 2021. In the video, Malone and the Weeknd engage in a shootout with each other's teams. It features the two artists as "vengeful enemies" in an "elaborate scenario," according to Rolling Stone, that ends in a shoot-out where both are killed after shooting each other at the same time. The video also mentioned MoonPay, a cryptocurrency company that had paid Post Malone and The Weeknd for the placement.

== Personnel ==
Credits adapted from Tidal and Genius.

- Post Malone – vocals, songwriting
- The Weeknd – vocals, songwriting
- Louis Bell – songwriting, production, recording engineering, vocal production, keyboards, synthesizer, programming, drums
- Andrew Bolooki – songwriting, production, programming, synthesizer
- Brian Lee – songwriting, production
- Billy Walsh – songwriting
- Manny Marroquin – mixing
- Mike Bozzi – mastering

== Charts ==
=== Weekly charts ===
Weekly chart performance for "One Right Now"
Chart (2021–2023)	Peak position
Australia (ARIA)	9
Austria (Ö3 Austria Top 40)	34
Belgium (Ultratop 50 Flanders)	43
Canada Hot 100 (Billboard)	7
Canada AC (Billboard)	33
Canada CHR/Top 40 (Billboard)	15
Canada Hot AC (Billboard)	29
Czech Republic Airplay (ČNS IFPI)	51
Czech Republic Singles Digital (ČNS IFPI)	54
Denmark (Tracklisten)	12
Finland (Suomen virallinen lista)	13
France (SNEP)	133
Germany (GfK)	45
Global 200 (Billboard)	9
Greece International (IFPI)	22
Iceland (Tónlistinn)	15
India International Singles (IMI)	8
Ireland (IRMA)	15
Italy (FIMI)	64
Lithuania (AGATA)	15
Mexico Airplay (Billboard)	33
Netherlands (Dutch Top 40)	25
Netherlands (Single Top 100)	35
New Zealand (Recorded Music NZ)	19
Norway (VG-lista)	7
Portugal (AFP)	33
Singapore (RIAS)	18
Slovakia (Singles Digitál Top 100)	26
South Africa (RISA)	32
South Korea (Gaon)	172
Sweden (Sverigetopplistan)	10
Switzerland (Schweizer Hitparade)	20
UK Singles (Official Charts)	20
US Billboard Hot 100	6
US Adult Contemporary (Billboard)	15
US Adult Pop Airplay (Billboard)	13
US Dance Airplay (Billboard)	19
US Pop Airplay (Billboard)	5
US Rhythmic Airplay (Billboard)	1

=== Year-end charts ===
2022 year-end chart performance for "One Right Now"
Chart (2022)	Position
Australia (ARIA)	72
Canada (Canadian Hot 100)	50
Global 200 (Billboard)	91
US Billboard Hot 100	30
US Adult Contemporary (Billboard)	42
US Adult Top 40 (Billboard)	31
US Mainstream Top 40 (Billboard)	16
US Rhythmic (Billboard)	9

== Certifications ==
Certifications for "One Right Now"
Region	Certification	Certified units/sales
Australia (ARIA)	3× Platinum	210,000^{‡}
Brazil (Pro-Música Brasil)	3× Platinum	120,000^{‡}
Canada (Music Canada)	3× Platinum	240,000^{‡}
Denmark (IFPI Danmark)	Gold	45,000^{‡}
France (SNEP)	Gold	100,000^{‡}
Italy (FIMI)	Gold	50,000^{‡}
New Zealand (RMNZ)	Platinum	30,000^{‡}
Norway (IFPI Norway)	Gold	30,000^{‡}
Poland (ZPAV)	Gold	25,000^{‡}
Portugal (AFP)	Gold	5,000^{‡}
Spain (Promusicae)	Gold	30,000^{‡}
United Kingdom (BPI)	Gold	400,000^{‡}
Streaming
Sweden (GLF)	Platinum	8,000,000^{†}
^{‡} Sales+streaming figures based on certification alone.^{†} Streaming-only figures based on certification alone.

== Release history ==
Release history for "One Right Now"
Region	Date	Format	Label	Ref.
Various	November 5, 2021	CD single; digital download; streaming	Republic	
Italy	November 5, 2021	Contemporary hit radio	Universal	
United States	November 9, 2021	Contemporary hit radio	Republic	
