= I Like You (A Happier Song) =

2022 single by Post Malone & Doja Cat

Single by Post Malone featuring Doja Cat

from the album Twelve Carat Toothache
- Released: June 3, 2022
- Genre: Pop rap; R&B
- Length: 3:13
- Label: Republic; Mercury
- Songwriters: Austin Post; Amala Dlamini; Louis Bell; Jasper Harris; William Walsh
- Producers: Jasper Harris; Louis Bell

Post Malone singles chronology
"Cooped Up" (2022)	"I Like You (A Happier Song)" (2022)	"Chemical" (2023)

Doja Cat singles chronology
"Vegas" (2022)	"I Like You (A Happier Song)" (2022)	"Kill Bill" (remix) (2023)

Music video
- "I Like You (A Happier Song)" on YouTube

"I Like You (A Happier Song)" is a song by American rapper and singer Post Malone featuring fellow American rapper and singer Doja Cat. The song was written by the artists alongside Billy Walsh and producers Louis Bell and Jasper Harris. It was sent to US contemporary hit radio as the third single from Malone's fourth studio album, Twelve Carat Toothache, on June 3, 2022. The song reached number three on the Billboard Hot 100, giving Malone his eleventh top-10 hit on the chart and Doja her sixth. It was also nominated for Best Pop Duo/Group Performance at the 65th Grammy Awards.

== Critical reception ==
Ben Devlin of MusicOMH praised the chemistry between Post Malone and Doja Cat on the song. Conversely, Robin Murray of Clash said that "Doja Cat seems wasted on the frothy 'I Like You (A Happier Song)'".

Writing for Billboard, Lyndsey Havens ranked it the third best song on Twelve Carat Toothache, noting it "impossible not to smile" at its titular lyric, "I like you, I do," further going on to praise Doja Cat's verse and harmonies which make the song "sweeter."

== Commercial performance ==
Following the release of Twelve Carat Toothache, "I Like You (A Happier Song)" debuted at number nine on the Billboard Hot 100. The song later peaked at number three in its 16th week on the chart. It was the most successful release from the album, as well as Post Malone's highest-charting single since "Circles".

== Music video ==
The music video, filmed in Ojai, California, was released on July 26, 2022. On September 8, 2022, a follow-up video subtitled "Even More" which features BTS footage of the original video was released.

As of November 2024, the videos have respectively received over 163 million and 38 million views.

== Charts ==
=== Weekly charts ===
Weekly chart performance for "I Like You (A Happier Song)"
Chart (2022–2023)	Peak position
Australia (ARIA)	7
Austria (Ö3 Austria Top 40)	51
Belgium (Ultratop 50 Wallonia)	31
Canada Hot 100 (Billboard)	5
Canada AC (Billboard)	46
Canada CHR/Top 40 (Billboard)	1
Canada Hot AC (Billboard)	6
Czech Republic Airplay (ČNS IFPI)	56
Czech Republic Singles Digital (ČNS IFPI)	42
Denmark (Tracklisten)	15
France (SNEP)	166
Germany (GfK)	59
Global 200 (Billboard)	7
Greece International (IFPI)	18
Hungary (Rádiós Top 40)	35
Iceland (Tónlistinn)	16
Ireland (IRMA)	15
Italy (FIMI)	86
Japan Hot Overseas (Billboard Japan)	8
Lithuania (AGATA)	29
Luxembourg (Billboard)	18
Malaysia (Billboard)	18
Malaysia International (RIM)	10
Netherlands (Single Top 100)	44
New Zealand (Recorded Music NZ)	6
Norway (VG-lista)	13
Portugal (AFP)	20
Romania (Radiomonitor)	17
San Marino (SMRRTV Top 50)	19
Singapore (RIAS)	12
Slovakia (Singles Digitál Top 100)	35
South Africa Streaming (TOSAC)	26
South Korea (Gaon)	186
Suriname (Nationale Top 40)	1
Sweden (Sverigetopplistan)	23
Switzerland (Schweizer Hitparade)	38
UK Singles (OCC)	19
US Billboard Hot 100	3
US Adult Contemporary (Billboard)	21
US Adult Pop Airplay (Billboard)	8
US Dance/Mix Show Airplay (Billboard)	12
US Pop Airplay (Billboard)	1
US Rhythmic Airplay (Billboard)	1
Venezuela Airplay (Record Report)	90
Vietnam (Vietnam Hot 100)	9

=== Year-end charts ===
2022 year-end chart performance for "I Like You (A Happier Song)"
Chart (2022)	Position
Australia (ARIA)	27
Belgium (Ultratop 50 Wallonia)	136
Canada (Canadian Hot 100)	20
Denmark (Tracklisten)	95
Global 200 (Billboard)	87
New Zealand (Recorded Music NZ)	42
US Billboard Hot 100	26
US Adult Top 40 (Billboard)	49
US Mainstream Top 40 (Billboard)	14
US Rhythmic (Billboard)	6

2023 year-end chart performance for "I Like You (A Happier Song)"
Chart (2023)	Position
Australia (ARIA)	72
US Billboard Hot 100	75
US Adult Top 40 (Billboard)	46
US Mainstream Top 40 (Billboard)	16

== Certifications ==
Certifications for "I Like You (A Happier Song)"
Region	Certification	Certified units/sales
Australia (ARIA)	5× Platinum	350,000^{‡}
Brazil (Pro-Música Brasil)	2× Platinum	80,000^{‡}
Canada (Music Canada)	3× Platinum	240,000^{‡}
Denmark (IFPI Danmark)	Platinum	90,000^{‡}
France (SNEP)	Gold	100,000^{‡}
Italy (FIMI)	Gold	50,000^{‡}
New Zealand (RMNZ)	3× Platinum	90,000^{‡}
Poland (ZPAV)	Gold	25,000^{‡}
Portugal (AFP)	Platinum	10,000^{‡}
Spain (Promusicae)	Gold	30,000^{‡}
United Kingdom (BPI)	Platinum	600,000^{‡}
Streaming
Sweden (GLF)	Gold	4,000,000^{†}
^{‡} Sales+streaming figures based on certification alone.^{†} Streaming-only figures based on certification alone.

== Release history ==
Release history for "I Like You (A Happier Song)"
Region	Date	Format	Label(s)	Ref.
United States	June 7, 2022	Contemporary hit radio	Republic; Mercury	
Italy	June 10, 2022	Radio airplay	Universal	
