= Only God Can Judge Me (EP) =

EP by Mark Morrison
- Released: 15 September 1997
- Recorded: 1996–1997
- Genre: Hip hop; R&B
- Length: 23:00
- Label: Mack Life Records; WEA
- Producer: Mark Morrison

Mark Morrison chronology
| Return of the Mack (1996) | Only God Can Judge Me (1997) | Innocent Man (2006) |

Singles from Only God Can Judge Me
- 1. "Who's the Mack!" Released: 21 August 1997

Only God Can Judge Me is the debut EP released by British singer Mark Morrison and the follow-up to his successful debut studio album, Return of the Mack. The title originated from his on-stage protest during the BRIT Awards when it was emblazoned in front of his black long-sleeve top.

The EP was released in the U.S. as The Judgement. It contains the UK top 20 hit "Who's the Mack!".

== Reception ==
Johnny Cigarattes of the NME complained about the EP only containing three new tracks, giving the release 7/10 if reviewed as an EP but -7/10 if reviewed as a "mini-album".

== Track listing ==
1. "Headlines"
2. "Who's the Mack!"
3. "Lord's Prayer Pt. 1"
4. "Only God Can Judge Me"
5. "NEC 96"
6. "Macklife"
7. "Lisa at Lunchtime"
8. "Blackstabbers"
9. "Lord's Prayer Pt. 2"

== Samples ==
- The track "Who's the Mack!" samples the DJ Quik song "Dollaz & Sense".
- The tracks "Headlines" and "Only God Can Judge Me" use elements from The Roots' track "What They Do".
