= Motley Crew (song) =

Song by Post Malone

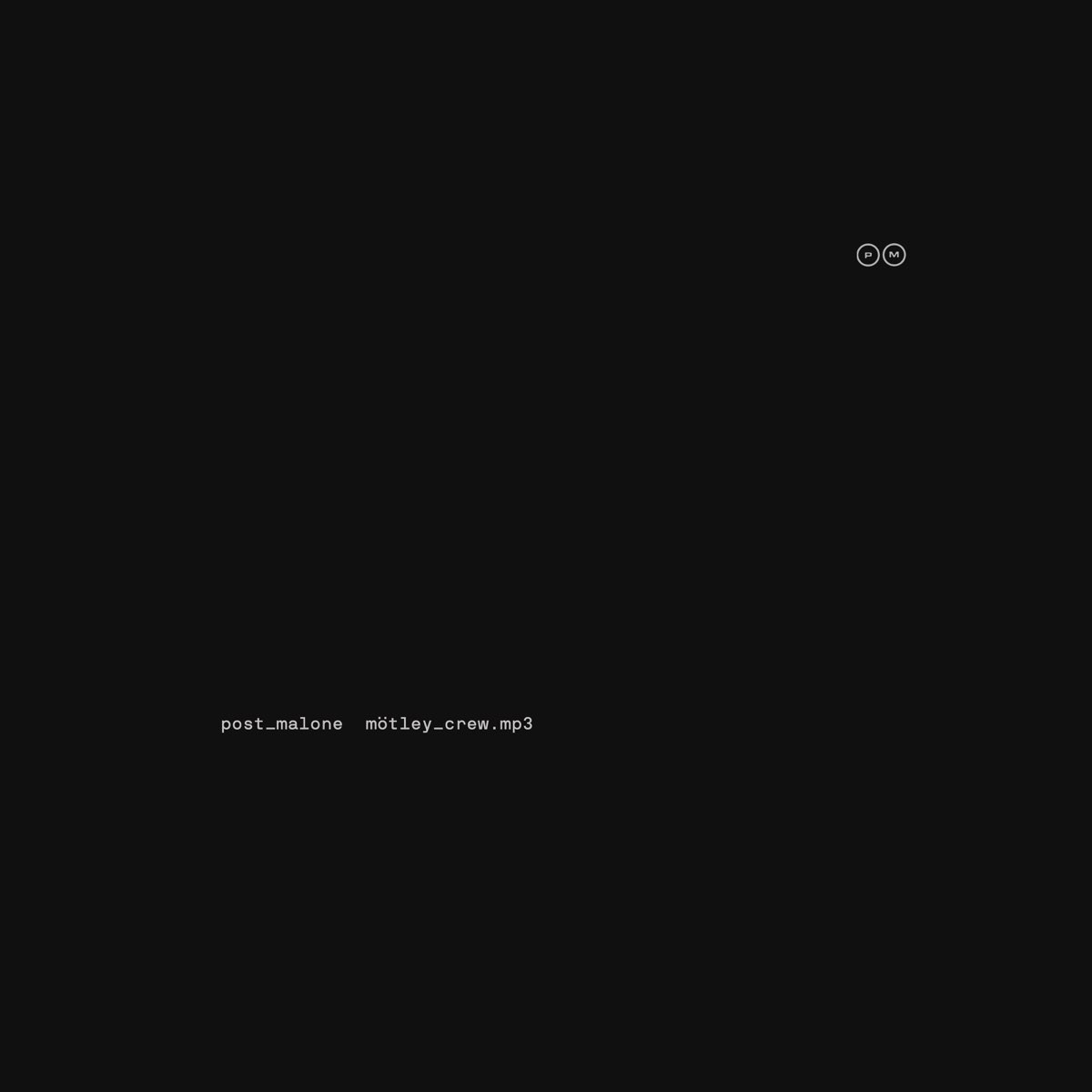

Single by Post Malone
- Released: July 9, 2021
- Genre: Trap
- Length: 3:04
- Label: Republic
- Songwriters: Austin Post; Daniel Kostov; Daniel Levin; David Doman; Ezemdi Chikwendu; Louis Bell
- Producers: Louis Bell; D.A. Got That Dope

Post Malone singles chronology
"I Did It" (2021)	"Motley Crew" (2021)	"One Right Now" (2021)

Music video
- "Motley Crew" on YouTube

"Motley Crew" is a song by American musician Post Malone, released on July 9, 2021, through Republic Records. The song marked his first solo release in almost two years.

== Background ==
Post Malone's manager Dre London previewed "Motley Crew" on July 4, 2021, to celebrate American Independence Day, and Post's birthday.

== Music video ==
The video was shot at Auto Club Speedway in Fontana, California, and thus features a racing motif with cameo appearances by NASCAR drivers Denny Hamlin and Bubba Wallace. The video also features drummer Tommy Lee, who drives Malone around the track in a custom convertible. Lee's band, Mötley Crüe, serve as the song's titular inspiration. The video also features cameos from Malone's previous collaborators, including Saint Jhn, Tyla Yaweh, Tyga, Ty Dolla Sign, Big Sean and French Montana. Rapper Pressa, singer Baby Santana, and Malone's manager Dre London all make appearances as well. The video was directed by Cole Bennett. The music video was uploaded to Bennett's Lyrical Lemonade channel the same day as the song's release; it was subsequently posted to Malone's own channel on July 12, 2021.

== Charts ==
=== Weekly charts ===
Weekly chart performance for "Motley Crew"
Chart (2021)	Peak position
Australia (ARIA)	19
Austria (Ö3 Austria Top 40)	36
Canada Hot 100 (Billboard)	9
Canada CHR/Top 40 (Billboard)	31
Czech Republic Singles Digital (ČNS IFPI)	17
Denmark (Tracklisten)	29
Finland (Suomen virallinen lista)	18
France (SNEP)	194
Germany (GfK)	33
Global 200 (Billboard)	13
Greece International (IFPI)	87
Hungary (Stream Top 40)	20
Ireland (IRMA)	24
Lithuania (AGATA)	21
Netherlands (Single Top 100)	73
New Zealand (Recorded Music NZ)	28
Norway (VG-lista)	21
Portugal (AFP)	44
Slovakia (Singles Digitál Top 100)	10
South Korea (Gaon)	179
Sweden (Sverigetopplistan)	37
Switzerland (Schweizer Hitparade)	38
UK Singles (OCC)	31
UK Hip Hop/R&B (OCC)	6
US Billboard Hot 100	13
US Hot R&B/Hip-Hop Songs (Billboard)	3
US Pop Airplay (Billboard)	22
US Rhythmic Airplay (Billboard)	6

=== Year-end charts ===
Year-end chart performance for "Motley Crew"
Chart (2021)	Position
Canada (Canadian Hot 100)	89
US Hot R&B/Hip-Hop Songs (Billboard)	70
US Rhythmic (Billboard)	50

== Certifications ==
Certifications for "Motley Crew"
Region	Certification	Certified units/sales
Australia (ARIA)	Platinum	70,000^{‡}
Brazil (Pro-Música Brasil)	Platinum	40,000^{‡}
Canada (Music Canada)	2× Platinum	160,000^{‡}
Denmark (IFPI Danmark)	Gold	45,000^{‡}
New Zealand (RMNZ)	Gold	15,000^{‡}
Poland (ZPAV)	Gold	25,000^{‡}
United Kingdom (BPI)	Silver	200,000^{‡}
^{‡} Sales+streaming figures based on certification alone.
