= Mann (rapper) =

American rapper

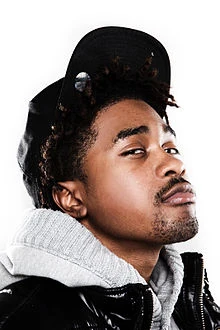
- Mann in 2012

Background information
- Born: Dijon Shariff Thames; July 17, 1991 (age 35); Los Angeles, California, U.S.
- Genres: Pop rap
- Occupations: Rapper; singer; songwriter
- Years active: 2008–present
- Labels: Peace Life Quality; FoLife; Beluga Heights; Island Def Jam; Mercury

Dijon Shariff Thames (born July 17, 1991), better known by his stage name Mann (often stylized in all caps), is an American rapper. Based in Los Angeles, he was discovered by record producer J. R. Rotem and signed with his label Beluga Heights Records in 2008. Mann is perhaps best known for his 2010 single "Buzzin'" (featuring 50 Cent), which entered the Billboard Hot 100.

He is the founder of the label Peace Life Quality Recordings.

Since 2008, Mann has released four albums and six mixtapes, and has collaborated with Jason Derulo, Jermaine Dupri, T-Pain, Kendrick Lamar, Frank Ocean, and Ty Dolla Sign, among others. Mann's latest album, It's Over With, was released on January 30, 2024.

== Early life ==
Thames grew up in Los Angeles, California, and attended Alexander Hamilton High School.

== Discography ==
=== Studio albums ===
- Mann's World (2011)
- The Grey Area (2014)
- South Of Pico (2018)
- West LA Baby (2020)
- CashApp$YumpyD (2021)
- It's Over With (2024)

=== EPs ===
- Fairfax & Pico (2017)
- Live from the 3 (2018)

=== Independent albums ===
- West LA Diaries Vol. 1: Vintage Cutz (2010)
- West LA Diaries Vol. 2: Near Life Experience (2011)
- West LA Diaries Vol. 3: Birthday Philosophy (2011)

=== Mixtapes ===
- Tell a Friend (2011)
- The Re-Introduction (2012)
- FMOV: Freshmann on Varsity (2012)
- The L.I.S.A. EP (2013)
- The Expansion Tape (2013)
- CAYD2 (2022)

=== Singles ===
==== As lead artist ====
List of singles, with selected chart positions, showing year released and album name
| Title | Year | Peak chart positions | | | | | | | Album |
| Title | Year | US | US R&B/HH | US Rap | AUS | IRE | SCO | UK | Album |
|---|---|---|---|---|---|---|---|---|---|
| "Ghetto Girl" (featuring Sean Kingston) | 2008 | — | — | — | — | — | — | — | Non-album singles |
| "We Are the World 25 for Haiti" (as part of Artists for Haiti) | 2010 | 2 | — | — | 18 | 9 | — | 50 | Non-album singles |
| "Text" (featuring Jason Derulo) | 2010 | — | — | — | — | — | — | — | Mann's World |
| "Buzzin'" (solo or remix featuring 50 Cent) | 2010 | 61 | 70 | 13 | — | 20 | 8 | 6 | Mann's World |
| "The Mack" (featuring Snoop Dogg and Iyaz) | 2011 | — | — | — | 68 | — | 36 | 28 | Mann's World |
| "Bend Ya" (featuring Kendrick Lamar and Frank Ocean) | 2013 | — | — | — | — | — | — | — | |
"—" denotes a title that did not chart, or was not released in that territory.

==== As featured artist ====
List of singles, showing year released and album name
| Title | Year | Peak chart positions | | Album |
| Title | Year | US Pop | UK | Album |
|---|---|---|---|---|
| "Music Sounds Better with U" (Big Time Rush featuring Mann) | 2011 | 26 | 61 | Elevate |
| "Dance with You" (Lucien featuring Mann) | 2012 | — | — | Non-album singles |
| "Dominoes" (Jess Wright featuring Mann) | 2013 | — | — | Non-album singles |
"—" denotes a title that did not chart, or was not released in that territory.

=== Guest appearances ===
List of non-single guest appearances, with other performing artists, showing year released and album name
| Title | Year | Other artist(s) | Album |
|---|---|---|---|
| "OMG" | 2010 | Fly Guys | Facegang |
| "Go Ahead" | 2010 | Casey Veggies | Sleeping In Class |
| "Better" | 2010 | BEeFF | All Style, No Substance |
| "Do What You Does" | 2011 | Trev Case | Wake Up |
| "When It Goes to Five" | 2011 | Shawn Chrystopher | I Wear Glasses 3 |
| "This Ain't Water" | 2011 | Starting Six | Let's Talk About S6x |
| "Reppin My City" | 2011 | Bobby Brackins | —N/a |
| "Bruh" | 2011 | Fly Guys, Shawn Chrystopher | Facegang 2 |
| "Live It Up" | 2011 | Kid Ink | Daydreamer |
| "Champion" | 2011 | Shawn Chrystopher | Silent Films For The Blind |
| "Crew Party" | 2012 | YMTK, Symba | —N/a |
| "Hit It On Top" | 2012 | Bobby Brackins | Stay On It |
| "Nineties" | 2012 | Audio Push | Inland Empire |
| "Cat Daddy" (Remix) | 2012 | The Rejectz, Tyga, Dorrough, Chamillionaire | —N/a |
| "Garcia Vega" | 2012 | BEeFF | Leaders of the Fake World |
| "Get Money" | 2012 | Timati, Mims | Swagg |
| "Fan of Me" | 2013 | Eric Bellinger | Born II Sing, Vol. 2 |
| "That's All" | 2013 | Jetpack Jones, Brock Berrigan | The 3rd Eye Initiative |
| "Tuition" | 2014 | BEeFF | #BEeFF |
| "Chill" | 2014 | Prince Sole, YMTK | Sunset Champagne + Cocaine |
| "Smoke Something" | 2016 | YMTK | Broad Life |
| "Prove It To Me" | 2016 | YMTK, Buddy | Broad Life |
