= Cooped Up =

2022 single by Post Malone and Roddy Rich

Single by Post Malone featuring Roddy Ricch

from the album Twelve Carat Toothache
- Released: May 12, 2022
- Genre: Pop rap
- Length: 3:05
- Label: Mercury; Republic
- Songwriters: Austin Post; Rodrick Moore Jr.; Louis Bell; William Walsh
- Producers: Post Malone; Louis Bell

Post Malone singles chronology
"One Right Now" (2021)	"Cooped Up" (2022)	"I Like You (A Happier Song)" (2022)

Roddy Ricch singles chronology
"Too Easy (Remix)" (2021)	"Cooped Up" (2022)	"How" (2022)

Music video
- "Cooped Up" on YouTube

"Cooped Up" is a song by American musician Post Malone featuring American rapper Roddy Ricch. It was released through Mercury Records and Republic Records on May 12, 2022, as the second single from Malone's fourth studio album Twelve Carat Toothache.

== Music video ==
The music video, directed by Andre Bato, was released on May 18, 2022.

== Remix ==
In October 2022, Malone, Mark Morrison and Sickick released a mashup of "Cooped Up" and "Return of the Mack", as "Cooped up / Return of the Mack". The song went viral on social media, then was made available for retail purchase. It was later certified Platinum by the Australian Recording Industry Association (ARIA).

== Live performances ==
On May 14, 2022, he appeared as a musical guest on Saturday Night Live and performed "Cooped Up" with Ricch.

== Personnel ==
Credits adapted from Tidal and Genius.

- Post Malone – vocals, songwriting, drums
- Roddy Ricch – vocals, songwriting
- Louis Bell – songwriting, production, recording engineering, vocal production, keyboards, synthesizer, programming, drums
- Billy Walsh – songwriting

== Charts ==
=== Weekly charts ===
Weekly chart performance for "Cooped Up"
Chart (2022)	Peak position
Australia (ARIA)	10
Austria (Ö3 Austria Top 40)	51
Canada Hot 100 (Billboard)	10
Canada CHR/Top 40 (Billboard)	44
Czech Republic Singles Digital (ČNS IFPI)	73
Denmark (Tracklisten)	21
Germany (GfK)	54
Global 200 (Billboard)	17
Iceland (Tónlistinn)	21
Ireland (IRMA)	20
Lithuania (AGATA)	50
Netherlands (Single Top 100)	70
New Zealand (Recorded Music NZ)	8
Norway (VG-lista)	20
Portugal (AFP)	10
Singapore (RIAS)	22
Slovakia (Singles Digitál Top 100)	14
South Africa Streaming (TOSAC)	16
South Korea Download (Gaon)	124
Sweden (Sverigetopplistan)	26
Switzerland (Schweizer Hitparade)	40
UK Singles (OCC)	18
UK Hip Hop/R&B (OCC)	6
US Billboard Hot 100	12
US Hot R&B/Hip-Hop Songs (Billboard)	5
US Pop Airplay (Billboard)	40
US Rhythmic Airplay (Billboard)	1
Vietnam (Vietnam Hot 100)	91

Chart performance for "Cooped Up / Return of the Mack"
Chart (2022)	Peak position
US Bubbling Under Hot 100 (Billboard)	23

=== Year-end charts ===
2022 year-end chart performance for "Cooped Up"
Chart (2022)	Position
US Hot R&B/Hip-Hop Songs (Billboard)	25
US Rhythmic (Billboard)	12

== Certifications ==
Certifications for "Cooped Up"
Region	Certification	Certified units/sales
Australia (ARIA)	Gold	35,000^{‡}
Australia (ARIA) for "Cooped Up / Return of the Mack"	Platinum	70,000^{‡}
Brazil (Pro-Música Brasil)	Platinum	40,000^{‡}
Canada (Music Canada)	Platinum	80,000^{‡}
New Zealand (RMNZ)	Platinum	30,000^{‡}
New Zealand (RMNZ) for "Cooped Up / Return of the Mack"	Gold	15,000^{‡}
Portugal (AFP)	Gold	5,000^{‡}
United Kingdom (BPI)	Silver	200,000^{‡}
^{‡} Sales+streaming figures based on certification alone.
