= Mark Morrison =

British singer (born 1972)

- Born: Mark Anthony Joseph Morrison; 12 May 1972 (age 54); Hanover, West Germany
- Origin: Leicester, England
- Genre: R&B
- Occupation: Singer
- Instrument: Vocals
- Years active: 1993–present
- Labels: WEA; Death Row; Mack Life
- Website: www.markmorrison.com

Mark Anthony Joseph Morrison (born 12 May 1972) is a German-born British R&B singer best known for his 1996 platinum hit song "Return of the Mack", which was immediately met with success upon its release in several European countries. In the following year, the song peaked at No. 2 in the United States.

Morrison's debut album, also titled Return of the Mack, became a multi-platinum success and produced five UK Top 10 singles, a record for a British debut album. Over the following decades he remained active through collaborations and high-profile samples of his work, including features with DMX, Cassidy, Trae tha Truth, G-Eazy, and Post Malone, as well as several commercially successful remixes of "Return of the Mack".

His career has also been marked by significant § Legal issues that received widespread media attention and affected his public profile. In later years he has remained active in public life, including briefly expressing interest in running for Mayor of Leicester, and has since established his residence in Florida.

== Early life ==
Morrison was born in Hanover, West Germany. He is of Barbadian descent. Morrison later lived in Leicester, England, until moving to the US city of West Palm Beach, Florida, at age 11. After graduating from Palm Beach Lakes High School in 1990, Morrison returned to Leicester.

== Career ==
Morrison's first official recording was the 1993 vinyl release "Where Is Our Love", pressed on his own private Joe'Mel label.

In mid-1995, Morrison released his debut single, "Crazy", which became a Top 20 hit in the UK and was a club favourite. The follow-up single, "Let's Get Down", also entered the Top 40. They were followed in the spring of 1996 by "Return of the Mack", which became a smash international hit, spending two weeks at the top of the UK Singles Chart.

His debut album, also titled Return of the Mack, followed and became a multi-platinum success. It reached number four in the UK chart and sold 3 million albums worldwide. It spun off several more hit singles over the next year: "Crazy", "Trippin'", "Horny" and "Moan & Groan" would all reach the UK Top 10, making him the first artist in British pop history to have five Top 10 hits from a debut album.

Although his career was going well, Morrison was constantly in trouble with the police. In 1997, he was imprisoned. The same year he received numerous nominations: four Brit Award nominations, a Mercury Prize nomination, an MTV Europe Music Award nomination, and five MOBO Award nominations. "Return of the Mack" began to climb its way to No. 2 on the American Billboard charts, receiving platinum status. It stayed on the Billboard charts for a lengthy 40 weeks. Morrison had one further minor US hit, 1997's "Moan & Groan," which went to number 76.

Morrison performed at the 1997 Brit Awards. The performance influenced WEA and Morrison to release Only God Can Judge Me, a nine-track EP which contains live performances, interviews, prayers and three full-length songs, including "Who's the Mack!", which reached No. 13 in the UK.

Morrison appeared on the 1999 Brit Awards where he presented an award, introduced Whitney Houston and announced his return to music. In September 1999, a single titled "Best Friend" (featuring Conner Reeves and Gabrielle) became Morrison's ninth Top 40 hit single, reaching No. 23 on the UK Singles Chart. The following year, it was announced by Billboard that Morrison had signed a five-year worldwide deal with Death Row Records founder Suge Knight, making him the first, and only, European (British) artist to be signed with Death Row Records, in a deal which saw Death Row Records UK operating as an independent record label in conjunction with the Ritz Music Group (a company known for its success with Irish country music artists such as Daniel O'Donnell).

He later signed to footballer Kevin Campbell's 2 Wikid label in 2003. His only release for the label, a single entitled "Just a Man"/"Backstabbers", was a minor UK hit, reaching No. 48 in the UK Singles Chart in August 2004.

In May 2006, Morrison released the limited-edition CD/DVD album entitled Innocent Man in the United Kingdom on his private label, Mack Life Records. The title track, "Innocent Man" (featuring DMX) was released in March 2006. It was well received and reached No. 46 on the UK Singles Chart. In 2007, he was featured on hip-hop artist Cassidy's single titled "Innocent Man (Misunderstood)" from the album B.A.R.S. The Barry Adrian Reese Story. The track sampled Morrison's vocals from "Innocent Man" and charted on Billboard's Bubbling Under Hot 100 Singles chart.

On 29 January 2007, he released the single titled "Dance 4 Me" (featuring Tanya Stephens). It was the fourth single to be released from his album Innocent Man. The official music video was directed by Ray Kay.

In 2012, Morrison appeared as a guest feature on Houston rapper Trae tha Truth's "I'm On 2.0" which featured notable rappers Big K.R.I.T., Jadakiss, J. Cole, Kendrick Lamar, B.o.B, Tyga, Gudda Gudda and Bun B. A music video for "I'm On 2.0" starring Morrison and all artists featured was released on 3 June. Also in June 2012, he announced the release of a new single titled "Ain't No Good". The single was set to be released 29 July 2013 and paid homage to the charity Refuge. The single was unsuccessful, and shelved before release. It would ultimately remain unreleased.

In June 2013, Morrison released the music video to "I Am What I Am" shot by DIS Guise of Visionnaire Pictures, with the release date set for the single on iTunes of 1 September 2013.

On 20 October 2013, he released a single titled "N.A.N.G. 2.0" featuring Crooked I and Shonie.

On 7 July 2014, Morrison released an EP titled I Am What I Am. The EP included the singles "I Am What I Am" and "N.A.N.G. 2.0", with five additional new songs.

In September 2016, American DJ Nevada remixed "Return of the Mack" for its 20th anniversary, retitling it "The Mack". Nevada's version features the re-recorded vocals of Morrison, and additional vocals from American rapper Fetty Wap.

In May 2017, a series of Burger King commercials for Mac and Cheetos featured a remix of Morrison's classic, entitled "Return of the Mac and Cheetos".

In July 2020, McDonald's featured "Return of the Mack" in a UK television commercial, as part of a post-COVID-19 lockdown promotional campaign to mark the resumption of services and the gradual reopening of restaurants.

In 2021, Morrison was featured alongside Chris Brown on G-Eazy's single "Provide", as the song samples "Return of the Mack".

In October 2022, Morrison, Post Malone and Sickick released a mashup of "Cooped Up" and "Return of the Mack". The song went viral on social media, then was made available for retail purchase.

== Personal life ==
In October 2020, Morrison publicly stated that he would consider challenging Peter Soulsby to become the next Mayor of Leicester. His bid ended in September 2022.

In October 2022, Morrison bought a house in Florida, paying $2 million in cash. He bought a second home in Palm Beach Gardens, Florida in December 2023.

== Legal issues ==
Morrison has faced various criminal charges during his career, including a 1997 conviction for attempting to bring a firearm aboard an airliner, for which he served three months in jail just as his hit song "Return of the Mack" began rising up the US Billboard charts. In 1998, he failed to appear in court on charges of possessing an offensive weapon, choosing to instead fly to Barbados. He was arrested and remanded into custody upon his return to the United Kingdom. He was later cleared of the offensive weapon charge.

He was convicted of affray for his part in a brawl resulting in one fatality and sentenced to community service. Morrison was later incarcerated in Wormwood Scrubs for a year for paying a lookalike (Gabriel Maferika) to perform his court-appointed community service in his stead, while Morrison himself went on tour. While in prison, Morrison reportedly converted to Islam and attempted to change his name to Abdul Rahman. Also in 1998, Morrison was banned from driving for six months and fined £1,380 after twice being caught driving without a licence.

In 2002, Morrison was arrested on suspicion of kidnapping and car theft. He was released on bail, but a policeman was later arrested on suspicion of taking a bribe from Morrison in return for his release. Morrison failed to appear in court to face the charges and a warrant was issued for his arrest.

In 2004, he was arrested and spent a night in custody, after a fracas in which a platinum and diamond medallion was snatched from around his neck during a confrontation at a Leicester nightclub.

In 2009, Morrison was arrested for an assault in London.

== Discography ==
=== Studio albums ===
- Return of the Mack (1996)
- Innocent Man (2006)

== Awards and nominations ==
| Year | Organization | Nominee / work | Category | Result | Ref. |
|---|---|---|---|---|---|
| 2025 | We Love Awards | "Okayyy We Back" (Andy Mineo featuring Mark Morrison) | Rap / Hip Hop Song of the Year | Nominated | |

== See also ==
- List of one-hit wonders in the United States
