= Return of the Mack =

1996 single by Mark Morrison

- Standard UK/European cover art

Single by Mark Morrison

from the album Return of the Mack
- Released: 4 March 1996
- Genre: R&B; new jack swing; ragga; soul
- Length: 4:34 (UK album version); 7:20 (US album version)
- Label: WEA
- Songwriter: Mark Morrison
- Producers: Mark Morrison; Phil Chill; Cutfather & Joe

Mark Morrison singles chronology
"Let's Get Down" (1995)	"Return of the Mack" (1996)	"Crazy (remix)" (1996)

Music video
- "Return of the Mack" on YouTube

Alternate cover
- US single cover

"Return of the Mack" is a song written and performed by British R&B singer-songwriter Mark Morrison, released by WEA Records as the third single from his debut album, Return of the Mack (1996). Produced by Morrison with Phil Chill and Cutfather & Joe, the song received positive reviews from music critics, appearing on Billboard magazine's "Top Songs of the '90s" and "500 Best Pop Songs of All Time" lists in 2019 and 2023, respectively.

Released in the United Kingdom on 4 March 1996, "Return of the Mack" topped the UK Singles Chart for two weeks the following month. The song then became a hit in Australia and Europe, entering the top 10 in multiple countries. In January 1997, it was released in the United States and reached number two on the Billboard Hot 100 that June, becoming Morrison's highest-charting hit in the US. The accompanying music video was directed by Jake Nava, featuring Morrison performing in an underground club.

== Background and composition ==
The song's beat is sampled from the song "Genius of Love" by American band Tom Tom Club. "Games" by Chuckii Booker was also sampled, as well as fragments from "UFO" by ESG, "Rocket in the Pocket" by Cerrone, and "Feel The Heartbeat" by The Treacherous Three.

== Critical reception ==
Larry Flick from Billboard magazine felt that UK crooner Mark Morrison "energizes a deflated U.S. R&B scene" with the song, noting that he "shows international promise with fresh lyrics and vocals, and classic soul production reminiscent of R&B's '80s heyday." Matt Diehl from Entertainment Weekly remarked that Morrison "comes off more like a funked-up Seal, promising revenge to a deceitful lover in a warbly croon. The end result is an odd but infectious new-jack-swing variation on 'Hey Joe', buoyed by bubbly beats and the insistent title refrain." Another EW editor, Leah Greenblatt, described the track as a "new-jackalicious breakup jam". Tom Ewing of Freaky Trigger noted that "the music certainly has his back – the rubbery basslines cocooning the song, the satisfying crunch of the drums, the light keyboard touches helping Morrison glide along his comeback trail." He added that it "is a pleasure to listen to, a well-tailored suit of sound."

Caroline Sullivan from The Guardian concluded in her album review, "He plays the sunglasses-at-night role to perfection on the album's title (and best) track". A reviewer from Music Week gave it four out of five, adding that the singer "looks to maintain the momentum of his hit 'Crazy' with another assured mix of R&B and ragga." Ralph Tee from the Record Mirror Dance Update gave it a top score of five out of five, writing, "This simply is every bit as good as what you would get from an American r&b act on a major label — and the song's better than most of what's coming out from across the pond of late." He added further, "The urban street production is a perfect vehicle for Mark's Jamaica-style tinged soul vocal on a song that deserves to be a smash, or an anthem at the very least."

== Chart performance ==
"Return of the Mack" reached number one in the United Kingdom during its sixth week on the UK Singles Chart, on 14 April 1996, and spent two weeks at the top. It entered the top 10 in Austria, Belgium (Flanders and Wallonia), Denmark, Germany, Ireland, the Netherlands, Norway, Sweden and Switzerland, as well as on the Eurochart Hot 100, on which it peaked at number five. Outside Europe, "Return of the Mack" reached number one in Zimbabwe, number two in Australia, and number three in New Zealand. In North America, it peaked at number two on the US Billboard Hot 100 and number 17 on the Canadian RPM 100 Hit Tracks chart. It additionally topped the Billboard Rhythmic Top 40 and RPM Dance charts. The single is certified platinum or higher in Australia, New Zealand, the UK and the US.

== Music video ==
The music video for "Return of the Mack" was directed by British director Jake Nava. It begins with Morrison arriving in London by Concorde flight in the evening. In his car (a silver Mercedes-Benz SL-Class) travelling towards the city, he starts singing. He has flashbacks of himself and his girlfriend, now ex. The car then stops in front of his ex and her new boyfriend standing by the street. The singer sings as he watches the new couple. Later he arrives at an underground club and hands the DJ a record which is immediately played. Shortly afterwards, the ex shows up in the club with her new guy. Standing in the crowd of dancing people, Morrison sings towards his ex. Then (in a flashback of the breakup) he sits down at a desk, inside an office. The ex comes in and sits down. They are confronting each other, and she ends up getting up, letting the chair fall as she leaves, looking at Morrison with a regretful face. The video ends with a close-up of Morrison sitting in the office in thoughts, while he smiles to the camera.

The ex-girlfriend is played by then unknown model Suzannah Agrippa miming to a featured vocal performance by Angie Brown. Numerous other extras were friends of the director.

== Impact and legacy ==
In December 1996, Melody Maker ranked "Return of the Mack" number nine in their list of "Singles of the Year", writing, "Forever playing in the mini-cab home, smooth and assured and absolutely f**ing diamond-sharp, Mark Morrison ruled supreme. The first great British swing record." In 2007, Stylus Magazine ranked it number 40 on its list of the "Top 50 One-Hit Wonders", stating that "over plush keyboards, fake turntable scratches, and a rhythm track that will be around 'til time immemorial, Morrison relates his griefs with an ex who he's returned to—what? Gloat in her face? Point out he's still surviving, even thriving? Nope, he's really returned to show what sleek R&B grooves and odd vocal cadences he's developed since being dumped." In August 2012, Polish Porcys ranked "Return of the Mack" number 71 in their list of "100 Singles 1990-1999".

In 2017, Billboard magazine ranked it number five in their list of "The 100 Greatest Pop Songs of 1997", writing, "From its first seconds, 'Return' busts through the wall like the Kool-Aid Man, and just picks up stream from there, more undeniable in its boom-bap strut with each You liiiiiied to me braying and Once again! ad lib. Between this, Vanilla Ice's 'Ice Ice Baby' and Backstreet Boys' 'Everybody (Backstreet's Back)', the '90s proved beyond a doubt that you don't need to be gone in the first place to have a triumphant banger proclaiming your return." Same year, BuzzFeed ranked it number 48 in their list of "The 101 Greatest Dance Songs of the '90s". In 2019, Billboard ranked it number 102 in their ranking of "Billboard's Top Songs of the '90s" while in October 2023, it was ranked number 318 in their "500 Best Pop Songs of All Time". In 2020, British footballer and MC Kamakaze (a.k.a. Matt Robinson) named it one of "The Best Tunes from the 90's", saying, "Leicester's longest standing hold in pop music ever I think. Instant club banger anywhere or anytime."

In April 2026, the song went viral on the platform TikTok when accompanying highlights of Paul George, with some fans dubbing it the "unwashed anthem".

== Formats and track listings ==
- CD single – Europe
1. "Return of the Mack" (C&J Radio Edit) – 3:32
2. "Return of the Mack" (Joe T. Vannelli Light Radio Edit) – 3:57
3. "Return of the Mack" (C&J Street Mix/UK Album Version) – 4:34
4. "Return of the Mack" (Terence Dackombe Mind Tricks Mix) – 3:46
5. "Return of the Mack" (D-Influence Mix) – 4:29
6. "Return of the Mack" (Full Crew Mix) – 3:56
7. "Return of the Mack" (Sir Gant Mix) – 4:58
- 12-inch maxi – Europe
1. "Return of the Mack" (C&J Street Mix/UK Album Version) – 4:34
2. "Return of the Mack" (D-Influence Mix) – 4:29
3. "Return of the Mack" (Joe T. Vannelli Light Mix) – 7:30
4. "Return of the Mack" (Joe T. Vannelli X-tended Corvette Mix) – 6:44
- CD maxi and 12-inch maxi – US
1. "Return of the Mack" (C&J X-Tended Radio Edit/US Album Version) – 7:20
2. "Return of the Mack" (Da Beatminerz Remix) - 4:32
3. "Return of the Mack" (Accappella of the Mack) - 2:56
4. "Trippin'" (C&J Street Mix) – 4:19
5. "Trippin'" (Salaam Remi Mix) – 4:22
6. "Return of the Mack" (Instrumental) – 5:49
- CD single – US
1. "Return of the Mack" (C&J Edit) - 3:32
2. "Return of the Mack" (Da Beatminerz Remix) - 4:32

== Charts ==
=== Weekly charts ===
Chart (1996–1998)	Peak position
Australia (ARIA)	2
Austria (Ö3 Austria Top 40)	7
Belgium (Ultratop 50 Flanders)	12
Belgium (Ultratop 50 Wallonia)	7
Canada (Nielsen SoundScan)	6
Canada Top Singles (RPM)	17
Canada Dance/Urban (RPM)	1
Croatia (HR Top 40)	1
Denmark (Tracklisten)	5
Europe (Eurochart Hot 100)	5
Europe (European Dance Radio)	1
France (SNEP)	12
Germany (GfK)	5
Iceland (Íslenski Listinn Topp 40)	14
Ireland (IRMA)	2
Israel (Israeli Singles Chart)	13
Italy (Musica e dischi)	24
Italy Airplay (Music & Media)	2
Netherlands (Dutch Top 40)	3
Netherlands (Single Top 100)	6
New Zealand (Recorded Music NZ)	3
Norway (VG-lista)	4
Scottish Singles Sales (Official Charts)	5
Sweden (Sverigetopplistan)	2
Sweden (Swedish Dance Chart)	1
Switzerland (Schweizer Hitparade)	7
UK Singles (Official Charts)	1
UK Hip Hop/R&B (Official Charts)	1
UK Airplay (Music Week)	1
UK Club Chart (Music Week)	7
US Billboard Hot 100	2
US Hot R&B Singles (Billboard)	4
US Maxi-Singles Sales (Billboard)	3
US Rhythmic Top 40 (Billboard)	1
US Top 40/Mainstream (Billboard)	3
Zimbabwe (ZIMA)	1

Chart (2023)	Peak position
Malta (Radiomonitor)	18

=== Year-end charts ===
Annual chart rankings
Chart (1996)	Position
Australia (ARIA)	8
Belgium (Ultratop 50 Flanders)	82
Belgium (Ultratop 50 Wallonia)	59
Europe (European Hit Radio)	8
Europe (Eurochart Hot 100)	17
France (SNEP)	36
Germany (Media Control)	25
Netherlands (Dutch Top 40)	21
Netherlands (Single Top 100)	54
New Zealand (RIANZ)	17
Sweden (Topplistan)	19
Sweden (Swedish Dance Chart)	3
Switzerland (Schweizer Hitparade)	34
UK Singles (OCC)	5
UK Airplay (Music Week)	3

Chart (1997)	Position
Canada Dance/Urban (RPM)	3
US Billboard Hot 100	8
US Hot R&B Singles (Billboard)	13
US Maxi-Singles Sales (Billboard)	14
US Rhythmic Top 40 (Billboard)	1
US Top 40/Mainstream (Billboard)	15

=== Decade-end charts ===
Chart (1990–1999)	Position
US Billboard Hot 100	100

== Certifications ==
Region	Certification	Certified units/sales
Australia (ARIA)	Platinum	70,000^{^}
Denmark (IFPI Danmark)	Gold	45,000^{‡}
France (SNEP)	Silver	125,000^{*}
Germany (BVMI)	Gold	250,000^{^}
New Zealand (RMNZ)	5× Platinum	150,000^{‡}
United Kingdom (BPI)	3× Platinum	1,800,000^{‡}
United States (RIAA)	5× Platinum	5,000,000^{‡}
^{*} Sales figures based on certification alone.^{^} Shipments figures based on certification alone.^{‡} Sales+streaming figures based on certification alone.

== Release history ==
Region	Date	Format(s)	Label(s)	Ref.
United Kingdom	4 March 1996	CD; 12-inch vinyl; cassette	WEA	
United States	21 January 1997	Rhythmic contemporary radio	Atlantic	
United States	11 February 1997	CD	Atlantic	
United States	18 February 1997	Contemporary hit radio	Atlantic	

== Mann version ==
"The Mack"

Single by Mann featuring Iyaz and Snoop Dogg

from the album Mann's World
- Released: 23 May 2011
- Recorded: 2011
- Genre: G-funk
- Length: 3:35
- Label: The Island Def Jam Music Group
- Songwriters: Mark Morrison; Calvin Cordozar Broadus, Jr.; Dijon Thames; Jonathan Rotem; Keidran Jones
- Producer: J.R. Rotem

Mann singles chronology
"Buzzin'" (2010)	"The Mack" (2011)	"Music Sounds Better with U" (2011)

Snoop Dogg singles chronology
"If I Was You (OMG)" (2011)	"The Mack" (2011)	"Young, Wild & Free" (2011)

Iyaz singles chronology
"Gonna Get This" (2010)	"The Mack" (2011)	"Pretty Girls" (2011)

American rapper Mann released a cover version of the song, featuring vocals from Snoop Dogg and Iyaz. His version is simply titled "The Mack". The single was released in the United Kingdom on 23 May 2011 as a digital download and in the United States on 5 July 2011.

=== Music video ===
A music video to accompany the release of "The Mack" was first released onto YouTube on 23 June 2011 at a total length of three minutes and fifty-five seconds. It features Mann, Iyaz and Snoop Dogg, at a pool party that starts off in the day into the night and they are surrounded by women. Mark is also shown entering London Heathrow Airport and then driving a car.

=== Track listing ===
No.	Title	Length
1.	"The Mack" (feat. Snoop Dogg & Iyaz)	3:35

=== Charts ===
Chart (2011)	Peak position
Australia (ARIA)	68
Australian Urban (ARIA)	20
Belgium (Ultratip Bubbling Under Flanders)	25
Belgium (Ultratip Bubbling Under Wallonia)	38
Scottish Singles Sales (Official Charts)	36
UK Hip Hop/R&B (Official Charts)	10
UK Singles (Official Charts)	28

=== Release history ===
Country	Date	Format	Label
United Kingdom	23 May 2011	Digital download	The Island Def Jam Music Group

== Nevada version ==
"The Mack"

Single by Nevada featuring Mark Morrison and Fetty Wap
- Released: 23 September 2016
- Genre: Tropical house
- Length: 2:47
- Label: Straightforward; Nourishing; Capitol
- Songwriters: Mark Morrison; William Maxwell; Jonathan White; Daniel Stephenson

Nevada singles chronology
"The Mack" (2016)	"Don’t Call Me" (2018)

Mark Morrison singles chronology
"MYLIFE 2.0" (2016)	"The Mack" (2016)	"Return of the Mack (SeeB Remix)" (2017)

Fetty Wap singles chronology
"Different Now" (2016)	"The Mack" (2016)	"With You" (2017)

American DJ Nevada remixed the song and retitled the release "The Mack", 20 years after the release of the original version Nevada's version features the re-recorded vocals of Mark Morrison, and additional vocals from American rapper Fetty Wap. The song was written by Morrison, William Maxwell, Daniel Stephenson, and Jonathan White. It was released to digital download through Straightforward Music, Nourishing Music, and Capitol Records on 23 September 2016.

=== Charts ===
==== Weekly charts ====
Chart (2016–2017)	Peak position
Australia (ARIA)	9
Austria (Ö3 Austria Top 40)	38
Belgium (Ultratip Bubbling Under Flanders)	5
Belgium (Ultratip Bubbling Under Wallonia)	22
Canada Hot 100 (Billboard)	79
Czech Republic Singles Digital (ČNS IFPI)	30
Germany (GfK)	33
Hungary (Single Top 40)	28
Ireland (IRMA)	14
Italy (FIMI)	53
Netherlands (Single Top 100)	46
New Zealand (Recorded Music NZ)	7
Portugal (AFP)	50
Scottish Singles Sales (Official Charts)	15
Slovakia Singles Digital (ČNS IFPI)	45
Sweden (Sverigetopplistan)	83
Switzerland (Schweizer Hitparade)	66
UK Singles (Official Charts)	14
US Dance Club Songs (Billboard)	4

==== Year-end charts ====
Chart (2016)	Position
Australia (ARIA)	97

==== Certifications ====
Region	Certification	Certified units/sales
Australia (ARIA)	2× Platinum	140,000^{‡}
Brazil (Pro-Música Brasil)	Gold	30,000^{‡}
Denmark (IFPI Danmark)	Gold	45,000^{‡}
Germany (BVMI)	Gold	200,000^{‡}
Italy (FIMI)	Gold	25,000^{‡}
New Zealand (RMNZ)	2× Platinum	60,000^{‡}
United Kingdom (BPI)	Platinum	600,000^{‡}
United States (RIAA)	Gold	500,000^{‡}
^{‡} Sales+streaming figures based on certification alone.

=== Release history ===
Country	Date	Format	Label	Version	Ref.
Worldwide	23 September 2016	Digital download	Straightforward; Nourishing; Capitol	Original	
Italy	28 October 2016	Contemporary hit radio	Universal	Original	
Worldwide	25 November 2016	Remixes Release	Straightforward Music	Crazy Couzinz Remix/David Zowie Remix	

== "Cooped Up / Return of the Mack" ==
In October 2022, Post Malone, Morrison and Sickick released a mashup of "Cooped Up" and "Return of the Mack", as "Cooped Up / Return of the Mack". The song went viral on social media, then was made available for retail purchase.

=== Certifications ===
Certifications for "Cooped Up / Return of the Mack"
Region	Certification	Certified units/sales
Australia (ARIA)	Gold	35,000^{‡}
New Zealand (RMNZ)	Gold	15,000^{‡}
^{‡} Sales+streaming figures based on certification alone.
