= Innocent Man (Mark Morrison album) =

2006 studio album by Mark Morrison

Studio album by Mark Morrison
- Released: 29 April 2002 (shelved) • 1 May 2006
- Recorded: 1999–2002
- Genres: Hip hop; gangsta rap; R&B
- Length: 60:33
- Labels: Mack Life; Mona
- Producers: Co-Stars; Mark Morrison

Mark Morrison chronology
Only God Can Judge Me (1997)	Innocent Man (2002)	I Am What I Am (2014)

Singles from Innocent Man
- 1. "Best Friend" Released: 8 August 1999; 2. "Just a Man / Backstabbers" Released: 16 August 2004; 3. "Innocent Man" Released: 10 April 2006; 4. "Dance 4 Me" Released: 5 February 2007

Innocent Man is the second studio album by British hip hop and R&B recording artist Mark Morrison, and released in the UK with a limited edition DVD release. It's Morrison's second full-length studio album and first since Return of the Mack in 1996.

The album was originally slated for an 29 April 2002 release on Death Row Records, with promotional copies and album samplers of the project being released, but the album was shelved due to label conflicts. In December 2004, Morrison attempted to release the album through his then-label 2 Wikid Records, but this did not happen as the project was again put on hold due to the label owner, famous footballer Kevin Campbell having disagreements with Morrison. The project was set for an April 2005 release, but it was again pushed back until 2006 when it was finally released on his own independent record label. The album subsequently failed to chart.

== Critical reception ==
The album received generally positive reviews. The Guardian gave it three stars, describing it as a "credible return". The Independent viewed the album as a clear improvement over Morrison's previous work.

== Track listing ==
1. "Innocent Man" featuring DMX
2. "Blackstabbers" featuring Daz Dillinger and Tray Deee
3. "Dance 4 Me" featuring Tanya Stephens
4. "Lately" featuring Elephant Man
5. "Friday"
6. "Nigga Ain't No Good"
7. "Best Friend" featuring Gabrielle and Conner Reeves
8. "Just a Man"
9. "Time To Creep" featuring Isyss
10. "Love You Bad"
11. "That's Life"
12. "Damn Damn Damn" featuring Adina Howard
13. "Wanna Be Your Man"
14. "Journeys" featuring Mica Paris and All Saints Road Community Choir
15. "Just a Man" featuring Alexander O'Neal (Bonus track)
16. "Innocent Man" featuring Tippa Irie (Bonus track)
