= Valerie Day =

American singer (born 1959)

- Born: November 20, 1959 (age 66); Portland, Oregon, U.S.
- Genres: Pop; jazz; R&B; blue-eyed soul
- Occupation: Singer
- Website: www.valeriedaysings.com

Valerie Day (born November 20, 1959) is an American pop and jazz singer. Born in Portland, Oregon, she is a fourth-generation Oregonian, and grew up in a musical family. She is the lead singer and a founding member of the 1980s dance band Nu Shooz, with her husband John Smith.

Day's performances with Nu Shooz had mixed reviews. She and Smith were credited with "rewriting the book" on Portland's R&B sound. One reviewer at the Seattle Times described her as having a "tough but perky wholesome image," and praised her dancing and conga playing, but opined that she over-used a certain vocal hook, and was reluctant to step out as the star of the group.

Day has taken on other musical genres. In the late 1990s she was a featured singer in the Woody Hite Big Band. She recorded an album of duets with pianist Tom Grant in 2005.

Also in 2005, Day won a contest to have an image of her lips used in the new corporate logo for Portland's Hot Lips Pizza as part of the company's 21st anniversary.

From 2010 to 2014, Day was an adjunct professor at Portland State University, where she taught Contemporary/Jazz Voice.
