= Return of the Mack (album) =

Studio album by Mark Morrison
- Released: 22 April 1996
- Recorded: 1995–1996
- Genre: R&B
- Length: 48:49
- Labels: Mack Life; Atlantic; Warner
- Producers: Mark Morrison; Phil Chill; Cutfather; Joe; Brockpocket for CBL

Mark Morrison chronology
Return of the Mack (1996)	Only God Can Judge Me (1997)

Singles from Return of the Mack
- 1. "Crazy" Released: 7 April 1995; 2. "Let's Get Down" Released: 20 September 1995; 3. "Return of the Mack" Released: 18 March 1996; 4. "Crazy (Remix)" Released: 16 July 1996; 5. "Trippin'" Released: 17 October 1996; 6. "Horny" Released: 19 December 1996; 7. "Moan and Groan" Released: 5 March 1997

Return of the Mack is the debut album by English-Barbadian singer-songwriter Mark Morrison. It was first released through his Mack Life Records imprint in the United Kingdom and then released by Atlantic Records in the United States, with distribution via Warner Music Group on 22 April 1996. The album includes the titular song "Return of the Mack", which stayed on the US Billboard charts for 41 weeks. Upon its release, Return of the Mack received mixed reviews from music critics, who praised Morrison's strong voice and entertaining songs, but described the album as having weak production. The album stayed for 38 weeks on the UK Albums Chart, where it debuted and peaked at number 4, and was certified Platinum by the British Phonographic Industry (BPI). On the US Billboard 200, the album reached number 76. The album has since sold over three million copies worldwide.

The album made Morrison the first artist in British pop history to have five top-ten singles from their debut album chart on the UK singles chart. These singles were "Return of the Mack", "Crazy (Remix)", "Trippin'", "Horny" and "Moan and Groan". The first single, "Crazy", became a top-twenty hit in the United Kingdom; a remix was later released, which peaked at number 6 in the UK. "Return of the Mack" became an international hit, spending two weeks at number one on the UK singles chart, and one week at number 2 on the US Billboard Hot 100. The song was listed at number 8 on the Billboard 200 year-end chart for 1997 and was certified Platinum by the Recording Industry Association of America (RIAA). Morrison became the first black male solo artist to reach number one on the UK singles chart in the 1990s. In 1997, he received four Brit Awards nominations, a Mercury Prize nomination, a MTV's Europe Music Awards nomination, and five Music of Black Origin Awards (MOBO) nominations. He would win the Best R&B song in the 1996's MOBO Awards for "Return of the Mack".

== Background ==
The album was released on 22 April 1996 through his own record label, Mack Life Records. The album was largely self-produced by Morrison, and was recorded over a two-year period. The album's release was preceded by the release of three singles.

== Release and promotion ==
At the 1997 Brit Awards held on 24 February 1997, he performed "Return of the Mack".

== Singles ==
The debut song "Crazy" became a top 20 hit in the UK. It was later featured in the 1997 film Speed 2: Cruise Control and appeared on the film's soundtrack album. The second single was "Let's Get Down".

== Critical reception ==
Professional ratings
Review scores
Source	Rating
AllMusic	4/5 stars
Entertainment Weekly	B
The Guardian	3/5 stars

Return of the Mack received mixed reviews from music critics. Entertainment Weekly writer Matt Diehl wrote "its title, "Return of the Mack" sounds like another rap tale of gangsta paradise; instead, Mark Morrison comes off more like a funked-up Seal, promising revenge to a deceitful lover in a warbly croon." He goes on to add, "the end result is an odd but infectious new-jack-swing variation on Hey Joe, buoyed by bubbly beats and the insistent title refrain."

== Track listing ==
Standard edition
No.	Title	Music	Producer(s)	Length
1.	"Home Part 1 (Interlude)"	Billy Moss	Mark Morrison, Phil Chill	1:08
2.	"Crazy"	Jim Abbiss	Mark Morrison, Phil Chill, Mykaell Riley	3:41
3.	"Let's Get Down"	Marcellus Fernandes	Brockpocket for CBL	3:53
4.	"Get High with Me"	R. Herrington, Mark Taylor, Phil Chill	Mark Taylor, Phil Chill	3:58
5.	"Moan and Groan"	Phil Bodger, Billy Moss, Don E	Phil Chill	5:27
6.	"Return of the Mack" (C&J Street Mix)	R. Herrington, Phil Chill, Al Christie, Mike McEvoy	Phil Chill, Mark Morrison, Cutfather, Joe	3:45
7.	"I Like"	Marcellus Fernandes	Brockpocket for CBL	3:49
8.	"Trippin'"	Billy Moss, Phil Chill, Don E	Mark Morrison, Phil Chill	4:45
9.	"Tears for You" (featuring Mica Paris)	Phil Bodger, Phil Chill, Mike McEvoy	Mark Morrison, Phil Chill,	4:43
10.	"Horny"	Mike McEvoy, Phil Chill, Jim Abbiss	Mark Morrison, Phil Chill	2:59
11.	"I Really Love You"	Phil Bodger, Phil Chill	Mark Morrison, Phil Chill	4:06
12.	"Crazy" (D-Influence Mix)		D-Influence, Mark Morrison, Phil Chill, Mykaell Riley	4:21
13.	"Home Part 2 (Interlude)"	Billy Moss	Mark Morrison, Phil Chill	1:16

US version
No.	Title	Length
1.	"Crazy" (D-Influence Mix)
2.	"Let's Get Down" (D-Influence Mix)
3.	"Get High with Me"
4.	"Moan and Groan" (C&J Extended Mix)
5.	"Return of the Mack" (C&J X-Tended Radio Edit)
6.	"I Like" (D-Influence Mix)
7.	"Trippin'" (C&J Mix)
8.	"Horny" (C&J Extended Mix)
9.	"Tears for You"
10.	"Candy"
11.	"Return of the Mack" (Da Beatminerz Remix)
12.	"Crazy" (Phil Chill Radio Edit)

== Charts ==
=== Weekly charts ===
Weekly chart performance for Return of the Mack
Chart (1996–1997)	Peak position
Australian Albums (ARIA)	24
Austrian Albums (Ö3 Austria)	22
Dutch Albums (Album Top 100)	23
French Albums (SNEP)	44
German Albums (Offizielle Top 100)	27
Swedish Albums (Sverigetopplistan)	29
Swiss Albums (Schweizer Hitparade)	5
UK Albums (Official Charts)	4
US Billboard 200	76
US Top R&B/Hip Hop Albums (Billboard)	30

Chart performance
Chart (2026)	Peak position
Croatian International Albums (HDU)	21

=== Year-end charts ===
Year-end chart performance for Return of the Mack
Chart (1996)	Position
UK Albums (OCC)	80

== Certifications ==
Certifications for Return of the Mack
Region	Certification	Certified units/sales
Canada (Music Canada)	Gold	50,000^{^}
New Zealand (RMNZ)	Platinum	15,000^{‡}
United Kingdom (BPI)	Gold	100,000^{^}
^{^} Shipments figures based on certification alone.^{‡} Sales+streaming figures based on certification alone.

== Release history ==
Release history for Return of the Mack
Region	Date	Label(s)	Format
United Kingdom	22 April 1996	Mack Life, Warner Music Group	CD, cassette, vinyl
United States	22 March 1997	Mack Life, Warner Music Group	CD, cassette, vinyl
