= 2018 in American music =

The following is a list of events and releases that happened in 2018 in music in the United States.

== Notable events ==
=== January ===
- 8 – Zac Brown Band performed "The Star-Spangled Banner" and Kendrick Lamar performed the halftime show at the 2018 College Football Playoff National Championship in Atlanta.
- 19 – Phillip Phillips released his first album in four years, Collateral.
- 12 – Camila Cabello's debut solo album Camila made her the youngest artist to top the Billboard 200 with a debut set since her later-to-be boyfriend Shawn Mendes' 2015 debut Handwritten.
- 26 – In a legal settlement, the music publisher for "We Shall Overcome" agreed that the song is public domain.
- 28 – The 60th Annual Grammy Awards, hosted by James Corden, took place at Madison Square Garden in New York City. It was the first time since 2003 that the show took place in New York City. Bruno Mars took home the most awards with six including Album of the Year with 24K Magic.

=== February ===
- 2 – Justin Timberlake released his first album in five years, Man of the Woods.
- 4 – P!nk performed "The Star-Spangled Banner" and Justin Timberlake performed at halftime at Super Bowl LII at U.S. Bank Stadium in Minneapolis.
- 9 – MGMT released their first album in five years, Little Dark Age.
  - Dashboard Confessional released Crooked Shadows, their first studio album in nearly nine years.

=== March ===
- 2 – Joan Baez released her first album in ten years, Whistle Down the Wind
  - The Breeders released All Nerve, their first studio album in ten years.
- 11 – The 2018 iHeartRadio Music Awards took place at The Forum in Inglewood, California.
- 16 – Scotty McCreery released his first album in five years, Seasons Change.
  - Stone Temple Pilots released their second self-titled album, their first studio album in eight years, their first with current vocalist Jeff Gutt and their first since the departures and deaths of former vocalists Scott Weiland and Chester Bennington.

=== April ===
- 6 – Thirty Seconds to Mars released their first album in five years, America.
  - Underoath released their first album in eight years, Erase Me.
- 11 – The Music Modernization Act, a bill that would reform how music rates are set & how songwriters and artists are paid, passes the United States House Committee on the Judiciary unanimously 32-0
- 13 – John Prine released his first album of original music in thirteen years.
- 15 – The 53rd Academy of Country Music Awards took place at the MGM Grand Garden Arena in Las Vegas. Reba McEntire returned to host for the first time in six years.
  - Cardi B's debut album Invasion of Privacy debuted atop the Billboard 200 setting multiple streaming records among female acts.
- 20 – A Perfect Circle released their first album in fourteen years, Eat the Elephant.
  - J. Cole released KOD, which debuted at number one on the Billboard 200, as well as breaking the first day streaming record on Spotify, which was later broke by Post Malone's Beerbongs & Bentleys and Drake's Scorpion.
- 25 – The Music Modernization Act passes in the United States House of Representatives unanimously 415–0.
- 27 – Godsmack released their first album in four years, When Legends Rise.
- 27 – Janelle Monáe released her first album in five years, Dirty Computer.

=== May ===
- 4 – Belly released Dove, their first studio album in 23 years.
- 9 – Taylor Swift began her record-breaking reputation stadium tour in Glendale Arizona.
- 20 – The Billboard Music Awards took place at the MGM Grand Garden Arena in Las Vegas hosted by Kelly Clarkson. This was the first ceremony to air on NBC.
- 21 – Maddie Poppe won the sixteenth season of American Idol. Caleb Lee Hutchinson is named runner up.
- 22 – Brynn Cartelli won the fourteenth season of The Voice. At age 15, Cartelli is the third youngest to ever win the show. Britton Buchanan was named runner up. Kyla Jade and Spensha Baker finished third and fourth place respectively.
- 25 – Korn frontman, Jonathan Davis released his debut solo album Black Labyrinth.

=== June ===
- 2 – BTS scored a #1 album on the Billboard 200 with Love Yourself 轉 'Tear', making it the highest ranking Asian album on the chart and the first foreign language #1 album since 2006.
- 8 – Dave Matthews Band released their first album in six years, Come Tomorrow. The album became their seventh consecutive to debut at #1 on the Billboard 200.
  - Sugarland released their first album in eight years, Bigger.
- 15 – Christina Aguilera released her first album in six years, Liberation.
- 18 – Rapper XXXTentacion is murdered in Florida.
- 29 – Guns N' Roses rereleased Appetite for Destruction with remastered songs.

=== July ===
- 2 – Cardi B became the first female rapper to attain multiple number one singles on the Billboard Hot 100.
- 27 – Daughtry released their first album in five years, Cage to Rattle.

=== August ===
- 10 – Jason Mraz released his first album in four years, Know.
  - Nicki Minaj released her first album in four years, Queen.
- 16 – The Queen of Soul, Aretha Franklin died at her home in Detroit, Michigan, at the age of 76. The official cause of death was pancreatic cancer of the neuroendocrine type.
- 20 – The MTV Video Music Awards took place from Radio City Music Hall in New York City.
- 24 – Alice in Chains released their first album in five years, Rainier Fog.

=== September ===
- 7 – Lenny Kravitz released his first album in four years, Raise Vibration.
  - Rapper Mac Miller died in his home at the age of 26. The official cause of death was a drug overdose.
- 8 – BTS scored their second #1 album on the Billboard 200 with Love Yourself 結 'Answer', making them the only Asian Act to do so.
- 14 – Carrie Underwood released Cry Pretty, which broke multiple records. She became the first female country artist ever to top the Billboard Artist 100.
  - Tony Bennett released his first collaborative album in four years, Love is Here to Stay with Diana Krall
- 18 – A modified version of the Music Modernization Act passes the United States Senate unanimously, sending bill back to House.
- 19 – For their first and only collaboration, Columbia Records releases a single between both deceased rappers Lil Peep and XXXTentacion, Falling Down. This marks XXXTentacion's first single since his untimely murder in June 2018.
- 21 – Slash featuring Myles Kennedy and The Conspirators released their first album in four years, Living the Dream.
- 24 – Cardi B extends her record for having the most number-ones for a female rapper (total of 3 so far) with the collaboration Girls Like You with Maroon 5.
- 25 – Music Modernization Act passes the House unanimously again. Bill sent to President Donald Trump to be signed.
- 28 – Mudhoney released their first album in five years, Digital Garbage.
  - After a four-year delay, Lil Wayne releases Tha Carter V, which is his first album since being released from Cash Money Records in June 2018.

=== October ===
- 5 – Steve Perry released his first solo album in twenty-four years, Traces.
  - Mario released his first album in nine years, Dancing Shadows.
- 9 – The American Music Awards took place at the Microsoft Theatre. The show shifted from Sunday to Tuesday, and moved up from November to October. Taylor Swift opened up the show performing "I Did Something Bad" and won four awards, making her the most awarded female artist in American Music Awards history surpassing Whitney Houston and the second most awarded overall artist, just behind Michael Jackson.
- 11 – President Trump signs the Music Modernization Act into law.
- 26 – The Black Eyed Peas released their first album in eight years, Masters of the Sun Vol. 1. This is their first album without Fergie since her departure from the band in early 2018, and their first album as a trio since their 2000 album Bridging the Gap.

=== November ===
- 2 – Pistol Annies released their first albums in five years, Interstate Gospel
  - Tenacious D released their album in six years, Post Apocalypto.
- 9 – J Mascis released his first album in four years, Elastic Days.
  - – Imagine Dragons released their fourth album, Origins.
  - Lil Peep released his posthumous album Come Over When You're Sober, Pt. 2.
- 14 – The 52nd CMA Awards took place live from the Bridgestone Arena in Nashville, Tennessee. Brad Paisley and Carrie Underwood was hosting eleventh year in a row.
- 16 – Mariah Carey released her first album in four years, Caution.
  - The Smashing Pumpkins released their first studio album in four years, Shiny and Oh So Bright, Vol. 1 / LP: No Past. No Future. No Sun.; it was also their first studio album to feature co-founder and guitarist James Iha since 2000's Machina II/The Friends & Enemies of Modern Music. Drummer Jimmy Chamberlin, who had left the band in 2009, also made his return on this album.
- 30 – Frank Loesser's popular 1949 song "Baby, It's Cold Outside" is withdrawn from radio airwaves in Cleaveland, Ohio due to the sexually suggestive lyrics, which have been compromised for nearly 7 decades. This ban was also seen as a factor from the sexual allegations against Bill Cosby.

=== December ===
- 3 – After a ten-year hiatus Hootie & the Blowfish appeared on the Today Show to announce that the band is back together, and will come out with a new album and tour in 2019.
- 7 – John Mellencamp released his fourth consecutive album in the last four years, Other Peoples Stuff
  - – Ice Cube released his first album in eight years, Everythang's Corrupt.
- 14 – Bruce Springsteen released his first commercial live album in eleven years Springsteen On Broadway
- 18 – Chevel Shepherd won the fifteenth season of The Voice. Chris Kroeze was the runner-up. Kirk Jay and Kennedy Holmes finished third and fourth place respectively.
- 20 – The Recording Industry of America published the year's top certified songs and albums. Eleven albums were certified Platinum during the year, including three multi-Platinum.
- 21 – Reel Big Fish released their first album in six years, Life Suck's Let's Dance.

== Bands reformed ==
- Bleeding Through
- Daron Malakian and Scars on Broadway
- The Distillers
- Framing Hanley
- The Gaslight Anthem
- Hootie & the Blowfish
- Hot Chelle Rae
- Mötley Crüe
- The Raconteurs
- Static-X

== Bands formed ==
- Gone West
- Kids See Ghosts
- Pattern-Seeking Animals
- Royal Coda

== Bands on hiatus ==
- At the Drive-In
- Fifth Harmony
- Hoops
- Say Anything

== Bands disbanded ==
- 7 Seconds
- Balance and Composure
- Brand New
- Company of Thieves
- Darkness Divided
- Dirge Within
- Iron Man
- A Lot Like Birds
- Minus the Bear
- The Orwells
- The Pizza Underground
- Sleeping Giant
- Soundgarden
- The Strypes
- The Thermals
- Vattnet
- Young and in the Way

== Albums released in 2018 ==
=== January ===
Date	Album	Artist	Genre (s)
1	POST-	Jeff Rosenstock	Punk rock; indie rock; power pop
5	Ephorize	Cupcakke	Hip hop
12	Wrong Creatures	Black Rebel Motorcycle Club	Rock
12	Vale	Black Veil Brides	Rock
12	Blue Madonna	Børns	Alternative rock; indie pop; psychedelic pop
12	Camila	Camila Cabello	Pop
12	Encore	Anderson East	Country
12	What Happens Next	Joe Satriani	Instrumental rock
12	it's not us	Umphrey's McGee	Rock
19	M A N I A	Fall Out Boy	Alternative rock
19	Let the Record Play	Moon Taxi	Indie pop; alternative rock
19	Defy	Of Mice & Men	Metalcore; nu metal
19	Sweetzerland Manifesto	Joe Perry	Rock
19	Collateral	Phillip Phillips	Pop rock
19	The House	Porches	Synth-pop
19	Starcrawler	Starcrawler	Rock
19	I Like Fun	They Might Be Giants	
19	I Can Feel You Creep Into My Private Life	tUnE-yArDs	Art pop; indie pop; indie rock
26	The Dangerous Summer	The Dangerous Summer	Alternative rock; emo
26	Culture II	Migos	Hip hop; trap
26	Snares Like a Haircut	No Age	Noise rock; art punk
26	Freedom's Goblin	Ty Segall	Garage rock; indie rock; psychedelic rock
26	Entertainment	Waterparks	Rock

=== February ===
Date	Album	Artist	Genre (s)
2	Here Come the Runts	AWOLNATION	Alternative rock
2	Man of the Woods	Justin Timberlake	Pop
9	Coma Noir	The Atlas Moth	Post-metal
9	Crooked Shadows	Dashboard Confessional	Emo; alternative rock
9	Sleepwalkers	Brian Fallon	Alternative rock; folk rock; punk rock
9	King Soon Come	Foxy Brown	Hip hop
9	Black Panther: The Album	Kendrick Lamar; various	Hip hop; soundtrack
9	Little Dark Age	MGMT	Alternative rock; indie rock
16	Twin Fantasy (Face to Face)	Car Seat Headrest	Indie rock
16	By the Way, I Forgive You	Brandi Carlile	Pop
16	Chromance	David Cook	Pop rock; rock
16	Sir	Fischerspooner	Electroclash
16	Pop Evil	Pop Evil	Hard rock
16	If There Is Light, It Will Find You	Senses Fail	Emo; pop punk
16	What a Time to Be Alive	Superchunk	Indie rock; punk rock
23	Cry No More	Danielle Nicole	Soul; blues
23	41	Reggie and the Full Effect	Alternative rock; pop-punk
23	Loner	Caroline Rose	Indie pop; indie rock
23	All at Once	Screaming Females	Punk rock; indie rock
23	Time & Space	Turnstile	Hardcore punk
23	The Lost Mile	Vertical Horizon	Alternative rock

=== March ===
Date	Album	Artist	Genre (s)
2	You're Not Alone	Andrew W.K.	Hard rock
2	All Nerve	The Breeders	Alternative rock
2	Nudes	Lucius	Indie pop; indie rock
2	Everything Was Beautiful, and Nothing Hurt	Moby	Electronica
2	Mt. Joy	Mt. Joy	Indie rock
2	A Productive Cough	Titus Andronicus	Punk rock; indie rock
3	Clean	Soccer Mommy	Indie rock
9	Automata I	Between the Buried and Me	Progressive metal
9	Francis Trouble	Albert Hammond, Jr.	Indie rock; indie pop
9	Year of the Tiger	Myles Kennedy	Americana; blues; country; rock
9	Silver Lining	Jake Miller	Pop
9	Tearing at the Seams	Nathaniel Rateliff & the Night Sweats	Rock; folk rock; indie folk; soul
9	The Neighbourhood	The Neighbourhood	Alternative rock
9	White Is Relic/Irrealis Mood	of Montreal	Indie rock; electropop
9	Get Your Fight On	Suicidal Tendencies	Rock
16	I'll Be Your Girl	The Decemberists	Indie rock
16	Seasons Change	Scotty McCreery	Country
16	Bible of Love	Snoop Dogg	Gospel; Soul
16	Stone Temple Pilots	Stone Temple Pilots	Alternative rock; hard rock
16	That's How We Do It	Trailer Choir	Country
16	?	XXXTentacion	Trap; alternative rock; emo hip hop
16	There's A Riot Going On	Yo La Tengo	Indie rock; experimental rock; noise pop
23	Hard Feelings	Blessthefall	Metalcore
23	Space Gun	Guided by Voices	Lo-Fi
23	Pilot	Hot Mulligan	Emo; pop punk
23	Castles	Lissie	Rock
23	Beasts of Burgundy	Squirrel Nut Zippers	Jazz; swing revival
23	Boarding House Reach	Jack White	Rock
30	Motel Bouquet	Caitlin Canty	Americana
30	Off to the Races	Jukebox the Ghost	Power pop; indie pop; alternative rock
30	Expectations	Hayley Kiyoko	Dream pop
30	Golden Hour	Kacey Musgraves	Country pop
30	The Awakening	The Red Jumpsuit Apparatus	Alternative rock; Christian rock; hard rock

=== April ===
Date	Album	Artist	Genre (s)
6	Invasion of Privacy	Cardi B	Hip hop
6	The Deconstruction	Eels	Rock
6	Electric Café	En Vogue	R&B; pop
6	Bark Your Head Off, Dog	Hop Along	Indie rock
6	Isolation	Kali Uchis	R&B
6	How to: Friend, Love, Freefall	Rainbow Kitten Surprise	Indie rock; alternative rock
6	America	Thirty Seconds to Mars	Electronica; art pop
6	Erase Me	Underoath	Alternative rock; hard rock; post-hardcore
6	The Louder I Call, the Faster It Runs	Wye Oak	Indie rock
13	Rearview Town	Jason Aldean	Country
13	Ember	Breaking Benjamin	Alternative metal; post-grunge
13	Love Rush	Rachael Cantu	Indie pop; indie rock
13	Ruiner	Nothing,Nowhere	Emo rap; indie rock
13	Treehouse	Sofi Tukker	EDM; dance-pop; alternative dance
13	Joyride	Tinashe	R&B; Hip hop
13	Quinceañera	Vendetta Red	Alternative rock
20	Family Tree	Black Stone Cherry	Hard rock; Southern rock; alternative rock
20	Kingdom Come	Kottonmouth Kings	Hip hop; rap rock; alternative hip hop
20	Vide Noir	Lord Huron	Indie rock; indie folk
20	Pinkus Abortion Technician	Melvins	Experimental rock
20	Volunteer	Old Crow Medicine Show	Americana
20	Never Gonna Die	Pennywise	Punk rock
20	Eat the Elephant	A Perfect Circle	Alternative rock; alternative metal; art rock
20	The Sciences	Sleep	Doom metal
27	Critical Equation	Dr. Dog	Rock
27	When Legends Rise	Godsmack	Hard rock; heavy metal
27	Bad Frequencies	Hawthorne Heights	Alternative rock; post-hardcore
27	Dirty Computer	Janelle Monáe	Pop; Hip hop; R&B
27	Beerbongs & Bentleys	Post Malone	Hip hop
27	Twerp Verse	Speedy Ortiz	Indie rock; noise pop
27	Megaplex	We Are Scientists	Indie rock

=== May ===
Date	Album	Artist	Genre (s)
3	Thirteen (EP)	William Ryan Key	Indie pop
4	Dove	Belly	Alternative rock; jangle pop
4	All These Hellos	Louise Goffin	Pop
4	The Horizon Just Laughed	Damien Jurado	Indie rock; indie folk
4	Almost Everyday	Matt and Kim	Indie pop
4	Attention Attention	Shinedown	Rock
4	The Make It All Show	Skating Polly	Alternative rock
11	7	Beach House	Dream pop
11	Kiss Yr Frenemies	Illuminati Hotties	Indie pop; indie rock
11	Floating Features	La Luz	Surf music
11	Unusual	Marian Hill	Electronic; synth-pop
11	Voicenotes	Charlie Puth	Pop
11	All I See Is War	Sevendust	Alternative metal
18	Goodbye Sunshine, Hello Nighttime	Family of the Year	Indie pop; indie folk
18	Goodbye & Good Riddance	Juice WRLD	Hip-Hop
18	And Justice For None	Five Finger Death Punch	Hard rock
18	Saved	Now, Now	Indie pop; dream pop
18	Wide Awake!	Parquet Courts	Rock; indie rock
18	Sparkle Hard	Stephen Malkmus and the Jicks	Indie rock
18	Only For You	Nedelle Torrisi	Indie rock
25	Black Labyrinth	Jonathan Davis	Hard rock; rock
25	Push Pull	Hoobastank	Alternative rock

=== June ===
Date	Album	Artist	Genre (s)
1	God's Favorite Customer	Father John Misty	Indie rock; indie folk
1	Cinematic	Owl City	Electronic; pop
1	The Future And The Past	Natalie Prass	Pop; indie pop
1	Nightstand	Tancred	Indie rock; indie pop
1	Ye	Kanye West	Hip hop
8	The Mountain	Dierks Bentley	Country
8	I Hope You're Happy	Blue October	Rock; alternative rock
8	Madly in Love at the End of the World	The Clarks	Rock; alternative country
8	Artificial Selection	Dance Gavin Dance	Post-hardcore; experimental rock
8	Come Tomorrow	Dave Matthews Band	Rock
8	Kids See Ghosts	Kids See Ghosts	Hip hop
8	Lush	Snail Mail	Indie rock
8	Bigger	Sugarland	Country
15	Liberation	Christina Aguilera	Pop; dance
15	Mixed Reality	Gin Blossoms	Alternative rock
15	Sunnyland	Mayday Parade	Pop punk
15	While We're at It	The Mighty Mighty Bosstones	Ska punk
15	Nasir	Nas	Hip hop
15	Post Traumatic	Mike Shinoda	Pop rock; electronic; hip hop
15	Living Proof	State Champs	Pop punk; pop rock
16	Everything Is Love	The Carters	Hip hop
22	Dan + Shay	Dan + Shay	Country
22	Soldier On	Mona	Alternative rock
22	Bad Witch	Nine Inch Nails	Industrial rock
22	Pray for the Wicked	Panic! at the Disco	Pop rock
22	Expectations	Bebe Rexha	Pop; dance
22	K.T.S.E.	Teyana Taylor	R&B
22	Petaluma	This Wild Life	Emo; acoustic
22	Mindset	Vacationer	Electropop; dream pop
22	Kids in the Night	Weathers	Alternative rock; indie rock
29	The Gift of Gab	E-40	Hip hop
29	Fight the Good Fight	The Interrupters	Ska punk; pop punk
29	Uniform Distortion	Jim James	Rock
29	Scorpion	Drake	Hip hop; R&B; pop

=== July ===
Date	Album	Artist	Genre (s)
6	Strings and Bling	Nasty C	Hip hop; trap; emo rap
6	Sun on The Square	The Innocence Mission	Alternative rock; indie pop
6	I'll tell You What!	RP Boo	Electronic
6	Six	We the Kings	Pop rock; pop punk
13	Automata II	Between the Buried and Me	Progressive metal
13	Ordinary Corrupt Human Love	Deafheaven	Black metal; heavy metal
13	Lamp Lit Prose	Dirty Projectors	Alternative R&B; Indie pop
13	Composure	Real Friends	Pop punk; emo
13	Everyday Life, Everyday People	Slightly Stoopid	Psychedelic rock; reggae rock
20	Dictator	Daron Malakian and Scars on Broadway	Rock; alternative metal
20	Hive Mind	The Internet	Soul; R&B
20	Take Me to the Disco	Meg Myers	Pop rock; indie rock
25	MxPx	MxPx	Punk rock
27	Songs For The Saints	Kenny Chesney	Country
27	Cage to Rattle	Daughtry	Rock; pop rock
27	Lifers	Cody Jinks	Country
31	Mutations	The Pink Spiders	Garage rock

=== August ===
Date	Album	Artist	Genre (s)
3	Golden Age	Houndmouth	Alternative country; indie rock; indie pop
3	Finding It Hard to Smile	lovelytheband	Pop rock; indie pop
3	Gutters	Middle Class Rut	Indie rock; alternative rock
3	Swimming	Mac Miller	Hip hop
3	To The Sunset	Amanda Shires	Americana; folk; country folk
3	Astroworld	Travis Scott	Hip hop; psychedelic rap
10	Solarize	Capital Cities	Indie pop
10	Shooter	Shooter Jennings	Country rock; southern rock
10	Meet Me At The River	Dawn Landes	Folk; Pop
10	Queen	Nicki Minaj	Hip hop
10	Know	Jason Mraz	Pop; pop rock
10	Jake Shears	Jake Shears	Pop
10	Life's a Trip	Trippie Redd	Hip hop
17	Belmont	Belmont	Pop-punk; alternative rock
17	Thank You for Today	Death Cab for Cutie	Indie rock; alternative rock
17	Sweetener	Ariana Grande	Pop; R&B; trap
17	Be the Cowboy	Mitski	Indie rock
17	Cool Patrol	Ninja Sex Party	Comedy rock
17	Smote Reverser	Oh Sees	Garage rock; punk rock
17	All of It	Cole Swindell	Country
24	Rainier Fog	Alice in Chains	Heavy metal; doom metal; sludge metal; grunge
24	Marauder	Interpol	Indie rock
24	Performance	White Denim	Indie rock
24	Parallel Universe	Plain White T's	Pop punk; pop rock
24	Sun Machine	Rubblebucket	Indie pop
31	Is This Thing Cursed?	Alkaline Trio	Punk rock; pop punk
31	Return of the Trill	Bun B	Hip hop
31	Kamikaze	Eminem	Hip hop
31	Weed Kitchen	Iron & Wine	Folk; folk rock
31	Magus	Thou	Doom metal

=== September ===
Date	Album	Artist	Genre (s)
7	Book of Bad Decisions	Clutch	Hard rock; stoner rock; blues rock
7	Whitey Ford's House of Pain	Everlast	
7	Magick Songs	JEFF the Brotherhood	Rock; indie rock
7	Raise Vibration	Lenny Kravitz	Rock; funk rock; hard rock
7	Adult Contemporary	Milo Greene	Indie pop
14	Bright to Death	Film School	Indie rock
14	Generation Rx	Good Charlotte	Pop punk; alternative rock
14	Hiding Place	Tori Kelly	Gospel; pop
14	Palms	Thrice	Post-hardcore
14	Cry Pretty	Carrie Underwood	Country
21	Coordinates (EP)	The Band Perry	Pop
21	They Are The Shield	Toby Driver	Avant Garde; pop
21	Mission Bell	William Fitzsimmons	Indie folk
21	Bridges	Josh Groban	Classical crossover; pop
21	Subject to Flooding	Jagwar Twin	Alternative rock; indie rock
21	Living the Dream	Slash featuring Myles Kennedy and The Conspirators	Hard rock; heavy metal
21	Proper Dose	The Story So Far	Pop punk
21	Suck It	The Supersuckers	Rock
27	Make Room	Destroy Boys	Punk rock
28	Detonate	Ballyhoo!	Alternative rock; punk rock
28	Disease	Beartooth	Hardcore punk; metalcore; pop punk
28	Dancing Queen	Cher	Pop
28	The Trip Home	The Crystal Method	Electronica
28	Fuzzybrain	Dayglow	Indie pop; alternative rock
28	New York Narcotic	The Knocks	Electronic
28	Digital Garbage	Mudhoney	Alternative rock; punk rock
28	For My Crimes	Marissa Nadler	Folk rock; indie rock; dream pop
28	Boom Boom Room (Side B)	Palaye Royale	Art rock; glam rock
28	Tha Carter V	Lil Wayne	Southern hip hop; Hip hop

=== October ===
Date	Album	Artist	Genre (s)
5	Mi Vida Local	Atmosphere	Hip hop
5	Vaxis – Act I: The Unheavenly Creatures	Coheed and Cambria	Progressive rock
5	Gold Rush	Max Frost	Indie pop; alternative rock
5	S'Only Natural	Hellogoodbye	Indie pop
5	Possible Dust Clouds	Kristin Hersh	Folk; pop
5	A Star Is Born	Lady Gaga & Bradley Cooper	Country; rock; pop
5	Malibu Nights	LANY	Electronic; electropop; dream pop
5	Drip Harder	Lil Baby & Gunna	Hip hop; trap
5	Dancing Shadows	Mario	R&B; pop; trap; electronic; experimental
5	Dime Trap	T.I.	Hip Hop, Rap
5	Mercury Retrograde	Tantric	Post-grunge; alternative metal
5	Trench	Twenty One Pilots	Alternative hip hop; pop rock; alternative rock
12	In Our Wake	Atreyu	Metalcore; alternative metal
12	Bad Behavior	Broncho	Indie rock; indie pop
12	Bunny	Matthew Dear	Electropop
12	Love Is Magic	John Grant	Folk rock; indie rock; alternative rock
12	The Atlas Underground	Tom Morello	Alternative rock; rock; folk
12	In the Drink	Justin Courtney Pierre	Indie rock
12	Mirror Master	Young the Giant	Indie rock; alternative rock
19	Last Building Burning	Cloud Nothings	Indie rock
19	Evolution	Disturbed	Hard rock; heavy metal
19	Anthem of the Peaceful Army	Greta Van Fleet	Hard rock; blues rock
19	Shake the Spirit	Elle King	Americana; pop rock; indie pop
19	Fair Enough (EP)	Minus the Bear	Indie rock
19	10 Lives	Saliva	Nu metal
19	C O M A	Sunflower Dead	Hard rock; heavy metal
19	Live from the Ryman	Jason Isbell	Americana; alternative country; southern rock
26	Masters of the Sun Vol. 1	The Black Eyed Peas	Political hip hop
26	Southern Ground Sessions (EP)	Blackberry Smoke	Hard rock; country rock; southern rock
26	Goners	Laura Gibson	Folk; indie rock
26	A Legendary Christmas	John Legend	Christmas
26	Loverboy/Dog Days	Miserable	Rock
26	Christmas Is Here!	Pentatonix	A capella; Christmas
26	9	Saves the Day	Pop punk; emo

=== November ===
Date	Album	Artist	Genre (s)
1	White Bronco	Action Bronson	Hip hop
2	Winter in the Air	David Archuleta	Christmas
2	Cheer	Drug Church	Punk rock; grunge
2	Fame	Mikky Ekko	Indie pop; alternative rock
2	Interstate Gospel	Pistol Annies	Country
2	This Is My Dinner	Sun Kil Moon	Folk rock; indie rock; alternative rock
2	Poison	Swizz Beatz	Hip Hop
2	Post-Apocalypto	Tenacious D	Alternative rock; hard rock; comedy rock
2	Not All Heroes Wear Capes	Metro Boomin	Hip hop; trap
9	Neon Future III	Steve Aoki	Electro house
9	Experiment	Kane Brown	Country
9	Singular	Sabrina Carpenter	Pop
9	The Capitol Studios Sessions	Jeff Goldblum & The Mildred Snitzer Orchestra	Jazz
9	Bought to Rot	Laura Jane Grace & The Devouring Mothers	Punk rock; indie rock
9	String Theory	Hanson	Orchestral pop
9	Origins	Imagine Dragons	Rock
9	Somewhere At The Bottom Of The River	La Dispute	Punk rock; indie rock; acoustic
9	Elastic Days	J Mascis	Alternative rock; hardcore punk; stoner rock
9	The Messenger	Rhett Miller	Alternative country; rock
9	Take Good Care	The Revivalists	Rock; alternative rock
9	Come Over When You're Sober, Pt. 2	Lil Peep	Hip hop
9	The Pimp Tape	Too Short	Hip hop
16	Upside Down Flowers	Andrew McMahon in the Wilderness	Alternative rock; pop rock
16	Caution	Mariah Carey	Pop; R&B; Hip hop
16	In the Future Your Body Will Be the Furthest Thing from Your Mind	Failure	Alternative rock; post-grunge
16	Faithful Fairy Harmony	Josephine Foster	Folk; art song; psychedelic rock
16	Broken	Memphis May Fire	Nu metal; hard rock
16	Acoustic Live Vol 1	Needtobreathe	Southern rock; country rock; indie rock
16	Circles	P.O.D.	Christian metal; rap metal; nu metal
16	Shiny and Oh So Bright, Vol. 1 / LP: No Past. No Future. No Sun.	The Smashing Pumpkins	Alternative rock; rock
23	Solo Anthology The best of Lindsey Buckingham	Lindsey Buckingham	Rock; pop
23	The Black Light 20th Anniversary	Calexico	Americana; indie rock; latin rock
23	Origins	Dan Reed Network	Hard rock; funk rock
23	A Million And One	My Brightest Diamond	Indie rock; baroque pop
30	Virtue (EP)	William Ryan Key	Indie pop
30	Afterlife	Light Years	Pop punk
30	Multisensory Aesthetic Experience	Mae	Emo; pop punk
30	Baker's Dozen Live At MSG	Phish	Rock; funk
30	Whole New Life	Reverend Horton Heat	Rockabilly; country
30	WARM	Jeff Tweedy	Alternative rock

=== December ===
Date	Album	Artist	Genre (s)
7	Superfecta	7horse	Rock
7	Persona Non Grata	Authority Zero	Ska punk; punk rock; reggae rock
7	This Will All Blow Over In Time	Cold War Kids	Indie rock; blues rock
7	Everythang's Corrupt	Ice Cube	Hip hop
7	Other Peoples Stuff	John Mellencamp	Pop; rock
7	Damned If You Do	Metal Church	Hard rock; heavy metal
7	Ticket to L.A.	Brett Young	Country
10	My Murdered Remains	They Might Be Giants	Alternative rock
10	The Escape Team	They Might Be Giants	Alternative rock
14	Icy Colors Change	Azealia Banks	R&B; hip hop; dance
14	The Lost Tapes	Valerie Carter	Soul; country rock
14	Dying To Live	Kodak Black	R&B; hip hop
14	Meet You In The Shadows	Outrageous Cherry	Pop; rock
14	Springsteen On Broadway	Bruce Springsteen	Pop; rock
14	Telling All My Secrets	Mitchell Tenpenny	Country
21	I Am > I Was	21 Savage	Hip hop
21	Hoodie SZN	A Boogie wit da Hoodie	Hip hop
21	Championships	Meek Mill	Hip hop
21	Am I a Girl?	Poppy	Dance; pop
21	Life Sucks...Let's Dance!	Reel Big Fish	Ska punk
21	Bunker Studio Sessions	Vérité	Indie pop, Electropop
24	X 100pre	Bad Bunny	Latin trap; hip hop; reggaetón
28	Go Dej Go Vol 1	Dej Loaf	Hip hop
28	Apalachain	Glasses Malone	Hip hop
28	Erase The Pain	Palisades	Post hardcore; electronicore
28	Sweat	Swizz Beatz	Hip hop
28	Tresures from the Temple	Thievery Corporation	Chill out; electronica
28	Call Me – Jazz from the Penthouse	Jack Wilson	Jazz

== Top songs on record ==
=== Billboard Hot 100 No. 1 Songs ===
- "Girls Like You" – Maroon 5 feat. Cardi B (7 weeks)
- "God's Plan" – Drake (11 weeks)
- "Havana" – Camila Cabello feat. Young Thug (1 week)
- "I Like It" – Cardi B, Bad Bunny and J Balvin (1 week)
- "In My Feelings" – Drake (10 weeks)
- "Nice for What" – Drake (8 weeks)
- "Perfect" – Ed Sheeran and Beyoncé (2 weeks in 2017, 4 weeks in 2018)
- "Psycho" – Post Malone feat. Ty Dolla Sign (1 week)
- "Sad!" – XXXTentacion (1 week)
- "Sicko Mode" – Travis Scott (1 week)
- "Thank U, Next" – Ariana Grande (6 weeks)
- "This Is America" – Childish Gambino (2 weeks)

=== Billboard Hot 100 Top 20 Hits ===
All songs that reached the Top 20 on the Billboard Hot 100 chart during the year, complete with peak chart placement.

- "1985" – J. Cole (#20)
- "A Holly Jolly Christmas" – Burl Ives (#12)
- "All I Want for Christmas Is You" – Mariah Carey (#6)
- "All Mine" – Kanye West (#11)
- "All the Stars" – Kendrick Lamar and SZA (#7)
- "Apeshit" – The Carters (#13)
- "ATM" – J. Cole (#6)
- "Back to You" – Selena Gomez (#18)
- "Bad!" – XXXTentacion (#16)
- "Bad at Love" – Halsey (#5)
- "Ball for Me" – Post Malone feat. Nicki Minaj (#16)
- "Barbie Dreams" – Nicki Minaj (#18)
- "Bartier Cardi" – Cardi B feat. 21 Savage (#14)
- "Be Careful" – Cardi B (#11)
- "Believer" – Imagine Dragons (#4 in 2017, #16 in 2018)
- "Better Now" – Post Malone (#3)
- "Big Bank" – YG feat. 2 Chainz, Big Sean and Nicki Minaj (#16)
- "Bodak Yellow" – Cardi B (#1 in 2017, #10 in 2018)
- "Boo'd Up" – Ella Mai (#5)
- "Breathin" – Ariana Grande (#12)
- "Call Out My Name" – The Weeknd (#4)
- "Can't Be Broken" – Lil Wayne (#17)
- "Can't Take a Joke" – Drake (#18)
- "Changes" – XXXTentacion (#18)
- "Chun-Li" – Nicki Minaj (#10)
- "Dedicate" – Lil Wayne (#14)
- "Delicate" – Taylor Swift (#12)
- "Diplomatic Immunity" – Drake (#7)
- "Don't Cry" – Lil Wayne feat. XXXTentacion (#5)
- "Don't Matter to Me" – Drake feat. Michael Jackson (#9)
- "Drip Too Hard" – Lil Baby and Gunna (#4)
- "Eastside" – Benny Blanco, Halsey and Khalid (#16)
- "Elevate" – Drake (#14)
- "Emotionless" – Drake (#8)
- "End Game" – Taylor Swift feat. Ed Sheeran and Future (#18)
- "Fake Love" – BTS (#10)
- "Fall" – Eminem (#12)
- "Falling Down" – Lil Peep and XXXTentacion (#13)
- "Feel It Still" – Portugal. The Man (#4 in 2017, #12 in 2018)
- "Fefe" – 6ix9ine, Nicki Minaj and Murda Beatz (#3)
- "Filthy" – Justin Timberlake (#9)
- "Finesse" – Bruno Mars and Cardi B (#3)
- "Freaky Friday" – Lil Dicky feat. Chris Brown (#8)
- "Friends" – Marshmello and Anne-Marie (#11)
- "Ghost Town" – Kanye West (#16)
- "Girls Like You" – Maroon 5 feat. Cardi B (#1)
- "God Is a Woman" – Ariana Grande (#8)
- "God's Plan" – Drake (#1)
- "Going Bad" – Meek Mill feat. Drake (#6)
- "Gucci Gang" – Lil Pump (#3 in 2017, #4 in 2018)
- "Gummo" – 6ix9ine (#12 in 2017, #13 in 2018)
- "Happier" – Marshmello and Bastille (#3)
- "Havana" – Camila Cabello feat. Young Thug (#1)
- "Heaven" – Kane Brown (#15)
- "High Hopes" – Panic! at the Disco (#5)
- "Him & I" – G-Eazy and Halsey (#14)
- "I Fall Apart" – Post Malone (#16)
- "I Get the Bag" – Gucci Mane feat. Migos (#11 in 2017, #19 in 2018)
- "I Like It" – Cardi B, Bad Bunny and J Balvin (#1)
- "I Love It" – Kanye West and Lil Pump (#6)
- "I'm Upset" – Drake (#7)
- "Idol" – BTS feat. Nicki Minaj (#11)
- "In My Blood" – Shawn Mendes (#11)
- "In My Feelings" – Drake (#1)
- "It's the Most Wonderful Time of the Year" – Andy Williams (#10)
- "Jingle Bell Rock" – Bobby Helms (#13)
- "Jocelyn Flores" – XXXTentacion (#19)
- "Kamikaze" – Eminem (#16)
- "Kevin's Heart" – J. Cole (#8)
- "Killshot" – Eminem (#3)
- "KOD" – J. Cole (#10)
- "Let It Fly" – Lil Wayne feat. Travis Scott (#10)
- "Let You Down" – NF (#12)
- "Lights Down Low" – MAX feat. Gnash (#20)
- "Look Alive" – BlocBoy JB feat. Drake (#5)
- "Love" – Kendrick Lamar feat. Zacari (#11)
- "Love Lies" – Khalid and Normani (#9)
- "Lucid Dreams" – Juice WRLD (#2)
- "Lucky You" – Eminem feat. Joyner Lucas (#6)
- "Meant to Be" – Bebe Rexha feat. Florida Georgia Line (#2)
- "Mia" – Bad Bunny feat. Drake (#5)
- "Mine" – Bazzi (#11)
- "Mo Bamba" – Sheck Wes (#6)
- "Mob Ties" – Drake (#13)
- "Mona Lisa" – Lil Wayne feat. Kendrick Lamar (#2)
- "Money" – Cardi B (#13)
- "Moonlight" – XXXTentacion (#13)
- "Motiv8" – J. Cole (#15)
- "MotorSport" – Migos, Nicki Minaj and Cardi B (#6 in 2017, #7 in 2018)
- "Natural" – Imagine Dragons (#13)
- "Never Be the Same" – Camila Cabello (#6)
- "Never Recover" – Lil Baby and Gunna feat. Drake (#15)
- "New Rules" – Dua Lipa (#6)
- "Nice for What" – Drake (#1)
- "No Brainer" – DJ Khaled feat. Justin Bieber, Chance the Rapper and Quavo (#5)
- "No Limit" – G-Eazy feat. ASAP Rocky and Cardi B (#4)
- "No Tears Left to Cry" – Ariana Grande (#3)
- "Nonstop" – Drake (#2)
- "Paranoid" – Post Malone (#11)
- "Perfect" – Ed Sheeran and Beyoncé (#1)
- "Photograph" – J. Cole (#14)
- "Plug Walk" – Rich the Kid (#13)
- "Pray for Me" – The Weeknd and Kendrick Lamar (#7)
- "Psycho" – Post Malone feat. Ty Dolla Sign (#1)
- "Rap Devil" – Machine Gun Kelly (#13)
- "Ric Flair Drip" – Offset and Metro Boomin (#13)
- "Rich & Sad" – Post Malone (#14)
- "River" – Eminem feat. Ed Sheeran (#11)
- "Rockin' Around the Christmas Tree" – Brenda Lee (#11)
- "Rockstar" – Post Malone feat. 21 Savage (#1 in 2017, #2 in 2018)
- "Sad!" – XXXTentacion (#1)
- "Same Bitches" – Post Malone feat. G-Eazy and YG (#20)
- "Say Something" – Justin Timberlake feat. Chris Stapleton (#9)
- "Shallow" – Lady Gaga and Bradley Cooper (#5)
- "Shape of You" – Ed Sheeran (#1 in 2017, #13 in 2018)
- "Sicko Mode" – Travis Scott (#1)
- "Sorry Not Sorry" – Demi Lovato (#6 in 2017, #15 in 2018)
- "Spoil My Night" – Post Malone feat. Swae Lee (#15)
- "Stargazing" – Travis Scott (#8)
- "Stay" – Post Malone (#17)
- "Stir Fry" – Migos (#8)
- "Sunflower" – Post Malone and Swae Lee (#4)
- "Survival" – Drake (#17)
- "Taki Taki" – DJ Snake feat. Selena Gomez, Ozuna and Cardi B (#11)
- "Talk Up" – Drake feat. Jay-Z (#20)
- "Taste" – Tyga feat. Offset (#8)
- "Thank U, Next" – Ariana Grande (#1)
- "The Christmas Song (Merry Christmas to You)" – Nat King Cole (#17)
- "The Middle" – Zedd, Maren Morris and Grey (#5)
- "The Ringer" – Eminem (#8)
- "This Is America" – Childish Gambino (#1)
- "Thunder" – Imagine Dragons (#4)
- "Too Good at Goodbyes" – Sam Smith (#4 in 2017, #7 in 2018)
- "Trip" – Ella Mai (#11)
- "Uproar" – Lil Wayne (#7)
- "Wake Up in the Sky" – Gucci Mane, Bruno Mars and Kodak Black (#11)
- "Walk It Talk It" – Migos feat. Drake (#10)
- "Watch" – Travis Scott feat. Lil Uzi Vert and Kanye West (#16)
- "What Lovers Do" – Maroon 5 feat. SZA (#9 in 2017, #17 in 2018)
- "What's Free" – Meek Mill feat. Rick Ross and Jay-Z (#20)
- "Whatever It Takes" – Imagine Dragons (#12)
- "Without Me" – Halsey (#2)
- "Yes Indeed" – Lil Baby and Drake (#6)
- "Yikes" – Kanye West (#8)
- "Young Dumb & Broke" – Khalid (#18)
- "Youngblood" – 5 Seconds of Summer (#7)
- "Zeze" – Kodak Black feat. Travis Scott and Offset (#2)

== Deaths ==
- January 1 – Betty Willis, 76, R&B singer
- January 2 – Rick Hall, 86, music producer
- January 3 – Josiah Boyd, 32, heavy metal bassist (A Hill to Die Upon)
- January 9 – Denise LaSalle, 78, R&B singer
- January 12 – Danny Woods, 73, soul singer (Chairmen of the Board)
- January 15 – Edwin Hawkins, 74, gospel singer
- January 20 – Fredo Santana, 27, rapper
- January 23 – Lari White, 53, country singer
- January 26 – Buzz Clifford, 76, pop singer
- January 28 – Eddie Shaw, 80, blues saxophonist
- January 30 – Mark Salling, 35, pop singer and actor
- January 31 –
  - Del Delker, 93, gospel singer
  - Leah LaBelle, 31, American Idol contestant
- February 2 – Dennis Edwards, 74, R&B singer
- February 3 – Leon Chancler, 65, rock and jazz singer
- February 7 – Pat Torpey, 64, hard rock drummer and singer
- February 8 –
  - John Perry Barlow, 70, songwriter
  - Algia Mae Hinton, 88, blues singer
- February 9 – Craig MacGregor, 68, rock bassist
- February 11 – Tom Rapp, 70, rock singer
- February 12 –
  - Vic Damone, 89, singer
  - Daryle Singletary, 46, country singer and songwriter
- February 13 –
  - Scott Boyer, 70, rock singer and guitarist
  - Billy Johnson, 42, emo and noise rock drummer (Reggie and the Full Effect)
- February 16 – Barbara Alston, 74, R&B singer (The Crystals)
- February 19 – Norm Rogers, 69, drummer (The Jayhawks, Cows)
- February 24 – Bud Luckey, 83, voice actor and singer
- March 1 – Bill Burkette, 75, pop singer (The Vogues)
- March 2 – Brandon Jenkins, 48, red dirt country singer, songwriter
- March 12 –
  - Nokie Edwards, 82, guitarist
  - Craig Mack, 46, rapper
- March 13 – Charlie Quintana, 56, rock drummer
- March 14 – Steve Mandell, 76, bluegrass guitarist and banjoist
- March 16 – Buell Neidlinger, 82, jazz cellist and bassist
- March 18 – Killjoy, 48, death metal singer
- March 19 – Hazel Smith, 83, country singer, songwriter, and journalist
- March 27 –
  - Bert Nievera, 81, singer (Society of Seven)
  - Kenny O'Dell, 73, country singer and songwriter
- March 28 – Caleb Scofield, 39, bassist (Cave In, Old Man Gloom and Zozobra)
- March 30 – Alias, 41, rapper and producer
- April 1 – Audrey Morris, 89, jazz singer
- April 4 – Don Cherry, 94, pop singer
- April 5 – Cecil Taylor, 89, jazz musician
- April 10 – Yvonne Staples, 80, soul singer (The Staple Singers)
- April 17 – Randy Scruggs, 64, songwriter
- April 20 – Avicii, 28, Swedish electronic musician, DJ, and songwriter
- April 23 – Bob Dorough, 94, jazz singer and pianist
- April 26 – Charles Neville, 79, R&B and jazz saxophonist
- April 30 – Tim Calvert, 52, heavy metal guitarist (Forbidden, Nevermore)
- May 1 – Jabo Starks, 79, funk and R&B drummer
- May 4 – Tony Kinman, cowpunk singer and bassist (The Dils, Rank and File, Blackbird)
- May 5 – Dick Williams, 91, pop singer
- May 7 – Gayle Shepard, 81, pop singer (Shepherd Sisters)
- May 10 – Ben Graves, 46, horror punk drummer (Murderdolls, Dope)
- May 11 – Matt Marks, 38, classical keyboardist (Alarm Will Sound)
- May 13 – Glenn Branca, 69, composer and guitarist
- May 19 –
  - Reggie Lucas, 65, jazz guitarist and pop songwriter
  - Patricia Morison, 103, actress and show tunes singer
- May 28 – Josh Martin, 46, grindcore guitarist (Anal Cunt)
- June 2 – Wayne Secrest (68), bassist (Confederate Railroad)
- June 3 – Clarence Fountain, 88, gospel singer (The Blind Boys of Alabama)
- June 4 – Jalal Mansur Nuriddin, 73, spoken word poet
- June 5 –
  - Jimmy Gonzalez, 67, Tejano singer (Mazz)
  - Ralph Santolla, 51, heavy metal guitarist
- June 7 – Al Capps, 79, arranger, composer and record producer
- June 10 – Neal E. Boyd, 42, opera singer
- June 11 – Wayne Dockery, 76, jazz bassist
- June 13 – D.J. Fontana, 87, rock and roll drummer
- June 15 –
  - Nick Knox, 60, drummer
  - Matt Murphy, 88, blues guitarist
- June 16 – Rebecca Parris, 66, jazz singer
- June 18 –
  - XXXTentacion, 20, rapper, singer, songwriter
  - Jimmy Wopo, 21, rapper
- June 19 – Lowrell Simon, 75, singer
- June 21 – David Corcoran, 64, rock drummer (Duke Jupiter)
- June 22 – Vinnie Paul, 54, heavy metal drummer (Hellyeah, Pantera, Damageplan)
- June 24 – George Cameron, 70, drummer (The Left Banke)
- June 26 – Ed Simmons, 101, classical conductor
- June 27 – Steve Soto, 54, punk rock guitarist
- June 29 – Eugene Pitt, 80, doo-wop singer (The Jive Five)
- June 30 – Dean Webb, 81, mandolinist (The Dillards)
- July 2 –
  - Henry Butler, 68, jazz pianist
  - Bill Watrous, 79, jazz trombonist
- July 3 – Richard Swift, 41, singer songwriter
- July 6 – Vince Martin, 81, folk singer
- July 7 – Brett Hoffman, 51, heavy metal singer
- July 8 – Tab Hunter, 86, actor and pop singer
- July 15 – Theryl DeClouet, 66, jazz funk and R&B singer
- July 27 – Mark Shelton, 60, heavy metal guitarist (Manilla Road)
- August 2 – Neil Argo, 71, film and television composer
- August 4 – Lorrie Collins, 76, singer and guitarist (The Collins Kids)
- August 14 – Jill Janus, 42, heavy metal singer
- August 16 – Aretha Franklin, 76, R&B/soul singer, and songwriter
- August 17 – Danny Pearson, 65, soul singer
- August 20 – Eddie Willis, 82, R&B/soul guitarist (The Funk Brothers)
- August 22 –
  - Ed King, 68, guitarist, bassist (Strawberry Alarm Clock, Lynyrd Skynyrd)
  - Lazy Lester, 85, blues singer and guitarist
- August 24 – DJ Ready Red, hip hop DJ (Geto Boys)
- August 25 – Kyle Pavone, 28, heavy metal singer (We Came as Romans)
- August 29 – Tony Camillo, 90, record producer and arranger (Bazuka)
- September 1 – Randy Weston, 92, jazz pianist
- September 4 – Don Gardner, 87, R&B Singer-Songwriter
- September 5 – Nasty Savage, 50 thrash metal bass player
- September 7 – Mac Miller, 26, rapper and singer
- September 8 – Chelsi Smith, 43, beauty pageant winner and singer
- September 10 – Johnny Strike, 70, punk singer and guitarist (Crime)
- September 14 – Max Bennett, 90, jazz and pop bassist
- September 16 – Big Jay McNeely, 91, saxophonist
- September 28 – Marty Balin, 76, founder of Jefferson Starship and solo artist
- September 29 – Otis Rush, 84, blues singer and guitarist
- October 1 – Jerry Gonzalez, 69 Latin jazz trumpeter
- October 3 – John Von Ohlen, 77, jazz drummer
- October 4 – Hamiet Bluiett, 78, jazz saxophonist
- October 5 – Bernadette Carol, 74, pop singer (The Angels)
- October 8 – Tim Chandler, 48, bass guitarist
- October 12 – Andrew Goessling, 59, progressive bluegrass musician (Railroad Earth)
- October 17 – Oil Herbert, 48, metalcore guitarist (All That Remains)
- October 18 – Randolph Hokanson, 103, classical pianist
- October 24 –
  - Wah Wah Watson, 67, R&B funk guitarist
  - Tony Joe White, 75, swamp rock singer songwriter and guitarist
- October 25 – Sonny Fortune, 79, jazz saxophonist
- October 26 – Baba Oje, 87, rapper and musician (Arrested Development)
- October 27 –
  - Freddie Hart, 91, country singer
  - Teddy Scott, 82, R&B singer (The G-Clefs)
  - Todd Youth, 47, rock guitarist
- October 29 –
  - Jimmy Farrar, 67, southern rock singer
  - Young Greatness, 34, rapper
- October 30 –
  - Hardy Fox, 73, avant-garde composer (The Residents)
  - Beverly McClellan, 49, blues and folk singer
- October 31 – Kenny Marks, 67, gospel singer
- November 1 – Dave Rowland, 74, country singer (Dave & Sugar)
- November 2 – Roy Hargrove, 49, jazz trumpeter
- November 3 –
  - Thomas Diaz, 32, emo singer (The World Is a Beautiful Place & I Am No Longer Afraid to Die)
  - Glenn Schwartz, 77, R&B guitarist
- November 4 – Josh Fauver, 39, indie rock bassist
- November 7 – Scott Herrick, pop singer (The Arbors)
- November 15 – Roy Clark, 85, country singer, songwriter, host of Hee Haw
- November 17 – Cyril Pahinui, 68, Hawaiian guitarist
- November 21 – Devin Lima, 41, pop singer (LFO)
- November 27 – Johnny Maddox, 91, Pianist
- November 28 – Roger Neumann, 77, jazz saxophonist
- November 29 – Erik Lindmark, 46, death metal singer and guitarist (Deeds of Flesh)
- December 1 –
  - Jody Williams, 83, blues musician
  - Calvin Newborn, 85, jazz guitarist
- December 2 – Perry Robinson, 80, jazz musician
- December 6 – Ace Cannon, 84, saxophonist
- December 7 –
  - The Mascara Snake, 70, avant-garde clarinetist
  - Lucas Starr, 34, metalcore and Christian guitarist
- December 13 – Nancy Wilson, 81, jazz singer
- December 14 – Joe Osborn, 81, bass guitarist
- December 15 – Jerry Chesnut, 87, songwriter
- December 22 – Jimmy Work, 94, country singer-songwriter
- December 24 –
  - James Calvin Wilsey, 61, rock guitarist
  - Jerry Riopelle, 77, singer-songwriter, musician, record producer

== See also ==
- 2010s in music
