= Paranoid (Post Malone song) =

2018 song by Post Malone

Song by Post Malone

from the album Beerbongs & Bentleys
- Released: April 27, 2018
- Length: 3:41
- Label: Republic
- Songwriters: Austin Post; Idan Kalai; Louis Bell; Billy Walsh; Alexander Krashinsky
- Producers: Cashio; Blueysport (co.); Bell (add.)

"Paranoid" is a song by American musician Post Malone and the opening track of his second studio album Beerbongs & Bentleys (2018). It was produced by Cashio, with co-production from Blueysport and additional production from Louis Bell.

== Background ==
During his performance at the Rolling Loud festival in 2021, Post Malone revealed that his inspiration for writing the song was from losing trust in his best friend in the music industry.

== Composition ==
In the song, Post Malone sings about being convinced that his enemies are following him, sleeping with a gun beside him, family and friends turning against him, and the overall feeling that he cannot trust anyone. He also compares himself to whistleblower Edward Snowden at one point. Evan Rytlewski of Pitchfork described Malone's singing in the song as 'guttural, belted delivery".

== Charts ==
Chart (2019)	Peak position
Australia (ARIA)	10
Austria (Ö3 Austria Top 40)	20
Canada Hot 100 (Billboard)	6
Denmark (Tracklisten)	10
France (SNEP)	164
Germany (GfK)	51
Ireland (IRMA)	7
Italy (FIMI)	60
Netherlands (Single Top 100)	33
New Zealand (Recorded Music NZ)	7
Norway (VG-lista)	16
Portugal (AFP)	12
Sweden (Sverigetopplistan)	16
UK Singles (OCC)	11
US Billboard Hot 100	11
US Hot R&B/Hip-Hop Songs (Billboard)	7

== Certifications ==
Region	Certification	Certified units/sales
Australia (ARIA)	Platinum	70,000^{‡}
Brazil (Pro-Música Brasil)	Platinum	40,000^{‡}
Canada (Music Canada)	2× Platinum	160,000^{‡}
Denmark (IFPI Danmark)	Gold	45,000^{‡}
New Zealand (RMNZ)	Platinum	30,000^{‡}
Portugal (AFP)	Gold	5,000^{‡}
United Kingdom (BPI)	Gold	400,000^{‡}
United States (RIAA)	Platinum	1,000,000^{‡}
^{‡} Sales+streaming figures based on certification alone.
