= Beerbongs & Bentleys =

2018 album by Post Malone

- CD copies are packaged as depicted; the digital artwork features a squared, off-white background

Studio album by Post Malone
- Released: April 27, 2018
- Recorded: 2016–2018
- Studios: Atrium (Calabasas); Electric Feel; Henson (Hollywood); Quad (New York City); Suite 100 (Atlanta)
- Genres: Pop; R&B; hip-hop; trap
- Length: 64:26
- Label: Republic
- Producers: Andrew Watt; Aubrey Robinson; Cashio; Frank Dukes; London on da Track; Louis Bell; Post Malone; Prep Bijan; Roark Bailey; Scott Storch; Swish; Tank God; Teddy Walton

Post Malone chronology
Stoney (2016)	Beerbongs & Bentleys (2018)	Hollywood's Bleeding (2019)

Vinyl cover

Singles from Beerbongs & Bentleys
- 1. "Rockstar" Released: September 15, 2017; 2. "Candy Paint" Released: October 20, 2017; 3. "Psycho" Released: February 23, 2018; 4. "Ball for Me" Released: May 8, 2018; 5. "Better Now" Released: May 25, 2018

Beerbongs & Bentleys is the second studio album by the American musician Post Malone. It was released by Republic Records on April 27, 2018. The album features guest appearances from Swae Lee, 21 Savage, Ty Dolla Sign, Nicki Minaj, G-Eazy, and YG. It includes production from frequent collaborators Louis Bell and Frank Dukes, alongside London on da Track, Andrew Watt, Tank God, Twice as Nice, Teddy Walton, Scott Storch, and PartyNextDoor, among others.

Beerbongs & Bentleys was a huge increase in commercial success compared to Malone's debut album Stoney (2016), topping the US Billboard 200 with 461,000 album-equivalent units generated in its first week, 153,000 of which were in pure sales. It also broke streaming records on Spotify having gained 47.9 million streams in the US in the first day of its release. The album was supported by five singles: "Rockstar", "Candy Paint", "Psycho", "Ball for Me", and "Better Now", with "Rockstar" and "Psycho" reaching number one on the US Billboard Hot 100. The album broke the record for the most simultaneous top 20 entries on the Hot 100 with nine songs in the top 20 of the chart.

Beerbongs & Bentleys received generally mixed reviews, with critics pointing to its overall lack of musical diversity—the rock influenced track "Over Now" and country folk track "Stay" were particularly praised for showcasing this sonic shift that was lacking throughout the album. Despite the underwhelming reception, Beerbongs & Bentleys was included in several year-end lists of the best albums of 2018, was nominated for Album of the Year at the 2019 Grammy Awards, and won the American Music Award for Favorite Rap/Hip Hop Album. As of 2025, it has been certified platinum in 16 countries, including a five-times platinum certification in the US.

== Background ==
Post Malone signed a record deal with Republic Records in 2015, following the success of his debut single "White Iverson". He also worked with high-profile musicians like Kanye West and Scott Storch, and toured with Fetty Wap and Justin Bieber during 2016. Released on December 9, 2016, his debut album Stoney was commercially successful; it was certified five-times platinum by the Recording Industry Association of America (RIAA), and produced three diamond-certified singles: "White Iverson", "Congratulations" featuring Quavo, and "I Fall Apart". During February 2017, he worked with Andrew Watt on the single "Burning Man". During May 2017, he performed at Rolling Loud in Miami, and also performed at North by Northeast the following month.

== Composition ==
Musically, Beerbongs & Bentleys has been described as pop R&B, hip-hop, and trap, with elements of pop rap.

== Promotion and release ==
Malone announced Beerbongs & Bentleys in a tweet on December 29, 2016, a week after previewing a song from the album. It originally targeted a June 2017 release date, though it was delayed, and Malone promised for it "to be out before the end of [2017]". During a podcast interview with h3h3Productions, he announced a release date of December 1, 2017. By November 21, it was confirmed that it would be delayed again, and Malone later apologized, stating: "I'm sorry to let you down, but I need to make sure this album is perfect for you. I'm gonna keep working my ass off and make the best fucking album ever".

The album's lead single, "Rockstar" featuring 21 Savage, was released for digital download on September 15, 2017. It was later sent to rhythmic and contemporary hit radio on September 26, 2017. The song peaked at number one on the US Billboard Hot 100, becoming Post Malone and 21 Savage's first number-one song.

The album's second single, "Candy Paint", was released on October 20, 2017. The song peaked at number 34 on the Billboard Hot 100.

The album's third single, "Psycho" featuring Ty Dolla Sign, was released for digital download on February 23, 2018. It was later sent to rhythmic contemporary radio on February 27, 2018. The song debuted at number two and later peaked at number one on the Billboard Hot 100.

"Ball for Me" featuring Nicki Minaj, was sent to rhythmic contemporary radio on May 8, 2018, as the album's fourth single. The song peaked at number 16 on the Billboard Hot 100.

"Better Now" was sent to UK contemporary hit radio on May 25, 2018 and US contemporary hit radio on June 5, 2018, as the album's fifth single. The song peaked at number three on the Billboard Hot 100.

== Critical reception ==
Beerbongs & Bentleys ratings
Aggregate scores
Source	Rating
AnyDecentMusic?	4.8/10
Metacritic	51/100
Review scores
Source	Rating
AllMusic	2.5/5 stars
Consequence	C−
Exclaim!	8/10
The Guardian	2/5 stars
HotNewHipHop	70%
NME	2/5 stars
Pitchfork	5.6/10
Rolling Stone	2/5 stars
Sputnikmusic	2.8/5
The Times	1/5 stars

According to the review aggregator Metacritic, Beerbongs & Bentleys received "mixed or average reviews" based on a weighted average score of 51 out of 100 from ten critic scores. Aggregator AnyDecentMusic? gave it 4.8 out of 10, based on their assessment of the critical consensus.

Alexis Petridis of The Guardian complimented the album's production, hooks and Post Malone's voice, but criticized Malone's lyrics: "Over a protracted period of time – and Beerbongs & Bentleys goes on and on like a charity telethon – there's a paucity of original ideas, the sense that he has virtually nothing to say for himself, and that whatever he has, has already been said umpteen times before with considerably more skill, wit and impact." Larry Bartleet of NME described the album as "voguish, trap-flavoured blandness", concluding Beerbongs & Bentleys is "more of a stultifying moodboard than an album with something to say" and that "its 18 tracks are homogenous playlist fodder targeted at the streaming machine". Andrew Unterberger of Billboard commented that "the album doesn't throw enough different looks at listeners to justify its 18-track length, leading to an inevitable second-half sag" but "it does have a couple moments that see Post stretching his musical boundaries, to promising effect".

Neil Z. Yeung of AllMusic said, "Beerbongs & Bentleys is an apt reflection of his lavish lifestyle and his subsequently begotten hardships, but its attempts at sincerity work only when Post Malone stops trying so hard". Evan Rytlewski of Pitchfork concluded that Beerbongs & Bentleys "plays to Post's greatest strength: his melodic instincts. His best hooks are so tuneful and airless they directly target the ear's pleasure centers", but "Post Malone's singular, dour mood wears thin and grows stale after too long".

Daniela Campos of Exclaim! wrote that the album represents "a focus on a rock-star rapper's lifestyle that's being pushed to the forefront for the public eye to decipher". Jordan M. of Sputnikmusic saying "This moment of fuzzed-out, fucked-up pop music with questionably scant odes to rap music is not designed for posterity. To his credit, Post gets that, and is content to make overlong albums where every song can be a single. Not every song on Beerbongs & Bentleys can be a single, but there's enough of them hiding in there to make it one of 2018's more rewarding releases". The rock influenced track "Over Now" and country folk track "Stay" were particularly praised for showcasing a sonic change.

=== Year-end lists ===
Select year-end rankings of Beerbongs & Bentleys
Publication	List	Rank	Ref.
Billboard	50 Best Albums of 2018	38	
Complex	50 Best Albums of 2018	23	
GQ (Russia)	The Best Music Albums of 2018	7	
Idolator	The 25 Best Albums of 2018	20	
Uproxx	The 50 Best Albums of 2018	40	

=== Industry awards ===
Awards and nominations for Beerbongs & Bentleys
Year	Ceremony	Category	Result	Ref.
2018	American Music Awards	Favorite Album – Rap/Hip-Hop	Won	
2018	LOS40 Music Awards	International Album of the Year	Nominated	
2019	Billboard Music Awards	Top Billboard 200 Album	Nominated	
2019	Billboard Music Awards	Top Rap Album	Nominated	
2019	Danish Music Awards	International Album of the Year	Nominated	
2019	Grammy Awards	Album of the Year	Nominated	
2019	Hungarian Music Awards	Foreign Hip-Hop Album of the Year	Nominated	
2019	Juno Awards	International Album of the Year	Won	

== Commercial performance ==
In the United States, on the day of its release, Beerbongs & Bentleys broke streaming records on Spotify. The album achieved 47.9 million streams in the US and 78,744,000 streams globally on the music service within 24 hours.

The album debuted at number one on the US Billboard 200, opening with 461,000 album-equivalent units in its first week, with 153,000 coming from pure sales. It logged the largest week of the year for an album, and the biggest streaming week ever with 431.3 million on-demand audio streams in the country, surpassing the previous record held by Drake's More Life (2017), which started with 384.8 million. In its second week, Beerbongs & Bentleys achieved 193,000 album-equivalent sales, 24,000 of which were pure sales, raising its two-week total to 663,000 album-equivalent sales. It remained atop the chart for a third week, with 147,000 album-equivalent units, including 18,000 pure sales. The following week, the album fell to number two with 123,000 album-equivalent units following the debut of Love Yourself: Tear by the Korean boy band BTS. On April 22, 2021, it was certified five-times platinum by the Recording Industry Association of America (RIAA) for combined sales, streaming and track-sale equivalents of five million units in the United States.

On May 12, 2018, Beerbongs & Bentleys broke the record for the most simultaneous top 20 entries on the US Billboard Hot 100 songs chart with nine songs in the top 20 of the Hot 100, shattering the previous record of six, which was shared by the Beatles and J. Cole. The Beatles held the record for 54 years, as they charted six songs in the top 20 on charts dated April 11 and 18, 1964. J. Cole tied the mark on May 5, 2018. Malone also broke the record for the most simultaneous top 40 Hot 100 hits: 14.

In the United Kingdom, Beerbongs & Bentleys debuted at number one, moving 46,000 album-equivalent units in its first week, with 35,000 units coming from streaming, giving Post Malone the third biggest opening week of streams for an album in the UK of all time.

In 2018, Beerbongs & Bentleys was ranked as the third most popular album of the year on the Billboard 200. The album finished 2018 having sold over 3,251,000 album-equivalent units in the US, with over 374,000 being pure sales. During 2019, it sold 1,258,000 album-equivalent units in the US, with over 78,000 being pure sales.

== Track listing ==
Beerbongs & Bentleys track listing
No.	Title	Writer(s)	Producer(s)	Length
1.	"Paranoid"	Austin Post; Idan Kalai; Louis Bell; Billy Walsh; Alexander Krashinsky	Cashio; Blueysport^{[a]}; Bell^{[b]}	3:41
2.	"Spoil My Night" (featuring Swae Lee)	Post; Khalif Brown; Adam Feeney; Teddy Walton; Bell	Frank Dukes; Walton	3:14
3.	"Rich & Sad"	Post; Feeney; Walsh; Bell	Frank Dukes	3:26
4.	"Zack and Codeine"	Post; Scott Storch; Diego Ave; Bell	Storch; Ave^{[a]}; Leon "RoccStar" Youngblood, Jr.^{[a]}; Tariq Bright^{[b]}	3:24
5.	"Takin' Shots"	Post; Jahron Brathwaite; Bell; David Hughes; Walsh	Bell; Prep Bijan; PartyNextDoor^{[a]}	3:36
6.	"Rockstar" (featuring 21 Savage)	Post; Shayaa Abraham-Joseph; Olufunmibi Awoshiley; Bell; Jo-Vaughn Virginie^{[c]}; Carl Rosen^{[c]}	Bell; Tank God	3:38
7.	"Over Now"	Post; Andrew Watt; Bell; Tommy Lee	Bell; Post Malone; Watt	4:07
8.	"Psycho" (featuring Ty Dolla Sign)	Post; Tyrone Griffin, Jr.; Bell; Rosen^{[c]}	Bell; Malone	3:41
9.	"Better Now"	Post; Bell; Feeney; Walsh; Kaan Gunesberk	Bell; Frank Dukes	3:50
10.	"Ball for Me" (featuring Nicki Minaj)	Post; Onika Maraj; Bell	Bell	3:26
11.	"Otherside"	Post; Bell	Bell; Malone	3:48
12.	"Stay"	Post; Wotman; Bell	Malone; Watt	3:24
13.	"Blame It on Me"	Post; Bell	Bell; Malone	4:21
14.	"Same Bitches" (featuring G-Eazy and YG)	Post; Gerald Gillum; Keenon Jackson; Samuel Ahana; Bell; Walsh; Kalai; Rod Argent	Swish; Cashio^{[b]}	3:32
15.	"Jonestown" (interlude)	Post; Bell; Te Whiti Warbrick; Nick Audino; Lewis Hughes	Bell; Malone; Twice as Nice^{[b]}	1:52
16.	"92 Explorer"	Post; London Holmes; Bell; Aubrey Robinson; Kendall Roark Bailey; Jaison Harris	London on da Track; Robinson; Roark Bailey	3:31
17.	"Candy Paint"	Post; Bell; Rosen^{[c]}	Bell; Malone	3:47
18.	"Sugar Wraith"	Post; Bell	Bell; Malone	3:48
Total length:				64:26

Japanese edition (bonus tracks)
No.	Title	Writer(s)	Producer(s)	Length
19.	"I Fall Apart"	Post; Carlo Montagnese; Billy Walsh	Illangelo	3:43
20.	"Congratulations"	Post; Leland Wayne; Feeney; Bell	Metro Boomin; Frank Dukes; Bell^{[b]}	3:43
21.	"Deja Vu" (featuring Justin Bieber)	Post; Justin Bieber; Feeney; Anderson Hernandez; Matthew Tavares; Gunesberk; Julian Swirsky; Bell	Frank Dukes; Vinylz	3:54
Total length:				75:30

Notes

- ^{^[a]} signifies a co-producer
- ^{^[b]} signifies an additional producer
- ^{^[c]} signifies an uncredited writer
- "Takin' Shots" features background vocals by PartyNextDoor
- "Stay" features background vocals by Watt

Sample credits

- "Same Bitches" contains interpolations from "Time of the Season", written by Rod Argent.
- "92 Explorer" contains interpolations from "Money Counter", written by Jaison Harris.

== Personnel ==
Musicians

- Austin Post – lead vocals (all tracks), guitar (tracks 7, 12)
- Andrew Watt – guitar, bass (tracks 7, 12), keyboards (track 7)
- Tommy Lee – drums (track 7)
- Louis Bell – drum programming, keyboards (track 7)
- Twice as Nice – drum programming (track 15)

Technical

- Louis Bell – recording (tracks 1–11, 13, 15–18), vocal production
- Ethan Stevens – recording (track 6)
- Lorenzo Cardona – recording (track 6)
- Samuel Ahana – recording (track 14)
- Roark Bailey – recording (track 16)
- Manny Marroquin – mixing (tracks 1–3, 4–11, 13, 14, 16, 18)
- David Nakaji – mixing (tracks 3, 15)
- Spike Stent – mixing (track 12)
- Joe Fitz – mixing (track 17)
- Chris Galland – mixing assistance (tracks 1, 2, 4–11, 13, 14, 16, 18)
- Robin Florent – mixing assistance (tracks 1, 2, 4–11, 13, 14, 16, 18)
- Scott Desmarais – mixing assistance (tracks 1, 2, 4–11, 13, 14, 16, 18)
- Mike Bozzi – mastering

== Charts ==
=== Weekly charts ===
Chart performance for Beerbongs & Bentleys
Chart (2018–2019)	Peak position
Australian Albums (ARIA)	1
Austrian Albums (Ö3 Austria)	2
Belgian Albums (Ultratop Flanders)	1
Belgian Albums (Ultratop Wallonia)	9
Canadian Albums (Billboard)	1
Czech Albums (ČNS IFPI)	2
Danish Albums (Hitlisten)	1
Dutch Albums (Album Top 100)	1
Finnish Albums (Suomen virallinen lista)	1
French Albums (SNEP)	13
German Albums (Offizielle Top 100)	4
Irish Albums (IRMA)	1
Italian Albums (FIMI)	6
Japanese Albums (Oricon)	162
New Zealand Albums (RMNZ)	1
Norwegian Albums (VG-lista)	1
Portuguese Albums (AFP)	33
Scottish Albums (Official Charts)	6
Slovak Albums (IFPI)	1
Swedish Albums (Sverigetopplistan)	1
Swiss Albums (Schweizer Hitparade)	3
UK Albums (Official Charts)	1
US Billboard 200	1
US Top R&B/Hip-Hop Albums (Billboard)	1

=== Year-end charts ===
2018 year-end chart performance for Beerbongs & Bentleys
Chart (2018)	Position
Australian Albums (ARIA)	4
Austrian Albums (Ö3 Austria)	25
Belgian Albums (Ultratop Flanders)	17
Belgian Albums (Ultratop Wallonia)	112
Canadian Albums (Billboard)	3
Danish Albums (Hitlisten)	1
Dutch Albums (MegaCharts)	5
French Albums (SNEP)	86
German Albums (Offizielle Top 100)	63
Icelandic Albums (Tónlistinn)	5
Irish Albums (IRMA)	5
Italian Albums (FIMI)	56
New Zealand Albums (RMNZ)	4
Swedish Albums (Sverigetopplistan)	3
Swiss Albums (Schweizer Hitparade)	65
UK Albums (OCC)	6
US Billboard 200	3
US Top R&B/Hip-Hop Albums (Billboard)	2

2019 year-end chart performance for Beerbongs & Bentleys
Chart (2019)	Position
Australian Albums (ARIA)	12
Austrian Albums (Ö3 Austria)	68
Belgian Albums (Ultratop Flanders)	23
Belgian Albums (Ultratop Wallonia)	184
Canadian Albums (Billboard)	4
Danish Albums (Hitlisten)	10
Dutch Albums (Album Top 100)	72
French Albums (SNEP)	172
Icelandic Albums (Tónlistinn)	23
Irish Albums (IRMA)	21
Italian Albums (FIMI)	86
New Zealand Albums (RMNZ)	10
Norwegian Albums (VG-lista)	11
Swedish Albums (Sverigetopplistan)	19
UK Albums (OCC)	25
US Billboard 200	5
US Top R&B/Hip-Hop Albums (Billboard)	1

2020 year-end chart performance for Beerbongs & Bentleys
Chart (2020)	Position
Australian Albums (ARIA)	28
Belgian Albums (Ultratop Flanders)	64
Canadian Albums (Billboard)	20
Danish Albums (Hitlisten)	31
Dutch Albums (Album Top 100)	35
Icelandic Albums (Tónlistinn)	54
Irish Albums (IRMA)	47
New Zealand Albums (RMNZ)	24
Norwegian Albums (VG-lista)	25
Swedish Albums (Sverigetopplistan)	48
UK Albums (OCC)	61
US Billboard 200	23
US Top R&B/Hip-Hop Albums (Billboard)	11

2021 year-end chart performance for Beerbongs & Bentleys
Chart (2021)	Position
Australian Albums (ARIA)	63
Belgian Albums (Ultratop Flanders)	144
Canadian Albums (Billboard)	33
Danish Albums (Hitlisten)	55
Dutch Albums (Album Top 100)	63
Icelandic Albums (Tónlistinn)	91
US Billboard 200	50
US Top R&B/Hip-Hop Albums (Billboard)	23

2022 year-end chart performance for Beerbongs & Bentleys
Chart (2022)	Position
Australian Albums (ARIA)	69
Canadian Albums (Billboard)	49
Danish Albums (Hitlisten)	74
US Billboard 200	71
US Top R&B/Hip-Hop Albums (Billboard)	30

2023 year-end chart performance for Beerbongs & Bentleys
Chart (2023)	Position
Australian Albums (ARIA)	65
Belgian Albums (Ultratop Flanders)	200
US Billboard 200	86
US Top R&B/Hip-Hop Albums (Billboard)	38

2024 year-end chart performance for Beerbongs & Bentleys
Chart (2024)	Position
Australian Hip Hop/R&B Albums (ARIA)	43

=== Decade-end charts ===
Decade-end chart performance for Beerbongs & Bentleys
Chart (2010–2019)	Position
Australian Albums (ARIA)	91
US Billboard 200	5

== Certifications ==
Certifications for Beerbongs & Bentleys
Region	Certification	Certified units/sales
Australia (ARIA)	3× Platinum	210,000^{‡}
Belgium (BRMA)	Gold	10,000^{‡}
Brazil (Pro-Música Brasil)	Platinum	40,000^{‡}
Canada (Music Canada)	8× Platinum	640,000^{‡}
Denmark (IFPI Danmark)	6× Platinum	120,000^{‡}
France (SNEP)	Platinum	100,000^{‡}
Germany (BVMI)	Gold	100,000^{‡}
Iceland (Tónlistinn)	—	4,333
Italy (FIMI)	Platinum	50,000^{‡}
Mexico (AMPROFON)	Platinum	60,000^{‡}
Netherlands (NVPI)	Platinum	40,000^{‡}
New Zealand (RMNZ)	7× Platinum	105,000^{‡}
Norway (IFPI Norway)	3× Platinum	60,000^{‡}
Poland (ZPAV)	2× Platinum	40,000^{‡}
Portugal (AFP)	Platinum	15,000^{^}
Singapore (RIAS)	Platinum	10,000^{*}
Sweden (GLF)	2× Platinum	60,000^{‡}
United Kingdom (BPI)	2× Platinum	600,000^{‡}
United States (RIAA)	5× Platinum	5,000,000^{‡}
^{*} Sales figures based on certification alone.^{^} Shipments figures based on certification alone.^{‡} Sales+streaming figures based on certification alone.

== Release history ==
Release dates and formats for Beerbongs & Bentleys
Region	Date	Label(s)	Format(s)	Ref.
Various	April 27, 2018	Republic	CD; digital download	
Japan	June 27, 2018	Universal Music Japan	CD	
Various	November 23, 2018	Republic	Vinyl	
