= Stay (Post Malone song) =

2018 song by Post Malone

Song by Post Malone

from the album Beerbongs & Bentleys
- Studio: Henson (Hollywood, California)
- Genre: Acoustic; country folk
- Length: 3:28
- Label: Republic
- Songwriters: Austin Post; Andrew Watt; Louis Bell
- Producers: Post Malone; Andrew Watt

"Stay" is a song by American musician Post Malone from his second studio album Beerbongs & Bentleys (2018). He wrote and produced it with Andrew Watt, with Louis Bell also receiving a writing credit. The song is an acoustic ballad with lyrics that center on a failing relationship.

== Writing and production ==
Post Malone and Andrew Watt started to work on "Stay" after the singer expressed his wish to create folk music and use live instrumentation. They met up at the Henson Recording Studios in Los Angeles where they wrote the song together. While recording its instrumental, they played two guitars at the same time, with Watt using a 1946 Martin O-18 and Malone using a 1953 Gibson J-45.

The working title of the song was "George Forever", a reference to George Harrison. Before the release of Beerbongs & Bentleys, they decided to change the title to "Stay".

== Music and lyrics ==
"Stay" is an acoustic ballad. It is composed in the key of C major, with a tempo of 86 beats per minute. Malone's vocals span from C_{3} to G_{4}. Billboard said of the track that it has a "1970s AM radio vibe" and described it as "a hybrid of Britpop melody and emo bloodiness". Writing for The Line of Best Fit, Ross Horton described the song's genre as country folk.

The lyrics center on a falling relationship. Larry Bartleet of NME noted that Malone also sings about his bad habits and their effects, comparing this record to "Feeling Whitney", a bonus track from the artist's first studio album Stoney.

== Release and promotion ==
On April 4, 2018, a preview of "Stay" was posted on Yahoo! Entertainment's website. Later that day, Malone performed it on stage for the first time during a live show played in Nashville, Tennessee as part of Bud Light's Dive Bar tour. The performance was simultaneously live streamed online.

On February 10, 2019, Malone performed a three-songs medley during the 61st Annual Grammy Awards ceremony. He started by performing "Stay" on the main stage while playing an acoustic guitar. It was followed by a solo rendition of "Rockstar" performed by the singer in a smokey tunnel. He carried on by joining the Red Hot Chili Peppers on the main stage for a joint performance of the band's 2016 single "Dark Necessities".

== Critical reception ==
Writing for Vanity Fair, Erin Vanderhoof praised the song's lyrics, calling "Stay" a "testament to Malone's skills as a songwriter". Beth Smith of Melodic, wrote that it is "lyrically one of the strongest tracks of the album" and thought that it helped showcasing the singer's vocal ability.

== Commercial performance ==
In the US, "Stay" debuted at 17 on the Billboard Hot 100 songs chart dated May 12, 2018. It was one of the singer's nine entries on the chart's top 20 that week, making him the singer with the most simultaneous top 20 songs, surpassing the record formerly held by The Beatles and J. Cole. On March 13, 2019, "Stay" was certified platinum by the Recording Industry Association of America (RIAA) for track-equivalent sales of one million units.

== Cover version ==
A cover of "Stay" was recorded by Australian pop rock band 5 Seconds of Summer and released in August 2018 for Spotify Singles alongside a toned-down version of their own single "Lie to Me". Most of the vocals were provided by Luke Hemmings and Michael Clifford. The band's drummer Ashton Irwin explained on Twitter that they chose to cover this song because they find it "beautifully written", comparing it to the work of The Beatles.

== Charts ==
Chart (2018)	Peak position
Australia (ARIA)	30
Austria (Ö3 Austria Top 40)	65
Canada Hot 100 (Billboard)	15
Czech Republic Singles Digital (ČNS IFPI)	51
Denmark (Tracklisten)	38
Greece (IFPI)	39
Ireland (IRMA)	16
Netherlands (Single Top 100)	66
Netherlands (Tipparade)	15
New Zealand (Recorded Music NZ)	20
Norway (VG-lista)	37
Portugal (AFP)	20
Slovakia Singles Digital (ČNS IFPI)	24
Sweden (Sverigetopplistan)	46
UK Audio Streaming (Official Charts)	21
US Billboard Hot 100	17

== Certifications ==
Region	Certification	Certified units/sales
Australia (ARIA)	Gold	35,000^{‡}
Brazil (Pro-Música Brasil)	2× Platinum	80,000^{‡}
Canada (Music Canada)	3× Platinum	240,000^{‡}
Denmark (IFPI Danmark)	Gold	45,000^{‡}
New Zealand (RMNZ)	Platinum	30,000^{‡}
Portugal (AFP)	Platinum	10,000^{‡}
United Kingdom (BPI)	Gold	400,000^{‡}
United States (RIAA)	Platinum	1,000,000^{‡}
^{‡} Sales+streaming figures based on certification alone.
