= List of highest-certified singles in Australia =

This is a list of highest-certified singles in Australia according to the Australian Recording Industry Association (ARIA). Since 1983, ARIA certifies a single Platinum for shipment of 70,000 copies across Australia. Single figures can include "qualifying streams" since July 2015. Since March 2022 this also includes Official Content streams on YouTube. According to the ARIA rules, a "single" is a product that may include up to five songs, thus including various EPs, which are also listed here.

All singles in this list must have won at least 10× ARIA Platinum Awards (700,000 copies). Prior to 1989, the values of the certifications were different, and a dearth of published data has made it difficult to source earlier release numbers.

The highest certified song in Australia is the 2011 "Somebody That I Used to Know" by Gotye featuring Kimbra, certified 26× Platinum, denoting 1,820,000 equivalent units.

== Highest-certified singles in Australia ==
List of highest-certified singles in Australia, according to ARIA's accreditations
Accreditation	Certified units	Title	Performer nationality	Artist	Year released
30× Platinum	2,100,000	"Youngblood"	Australia	5 Seconds Of Summer	2018
26× Platinum	1,820,000	"Somebody That I Used to Know"	Australia, New Zealand	Gotye featuring Kimbra	2011
25× Platinum	1,750,000	"Mr. Brightside"	US	The Killers	2005
23× Platinum	1,610,000	"Heat Waves"	UK	Glass Animals	2020
23× Platinum	1,610,000	"Someone You Loved"	UK	Lewis Capaldi	2019
22× Platinum	1,540,000	"Blinding Lights"	Canada	The Weeknd	2019
22× Platinum	1,540,000	"Roar"	US	Katy Perry	2013
22× Platinum	1,540,000	"Uptown Funk"	UK, US	Mark Ronson featuring Bruno Mars	2015
21× Platinum	1,470,000	"Counting Stars"	US	OneRepublic	2013
20× Platinum	1,400,000	"Closer"	US	The Chainsmokers featuring Halsey	2016
20× Platinum	1,400,000	"Lose Yourself"	US	Eminem	2003
20× Platinum	1,400,000	"Sunflower"	US	Post Malone and Swae Lee	2019
19× Platinum	1,330,000	"Dance Monkey"	Australia	Tones and I	2019
19× Platinum	1,330,000	"Say You Won't Let Go"	UK	James Arthur	2016
19× Platinum	1,330,000	"Shake It Off"	US	Taylor Swift	2014
18× Platinum	1,260,000	"Bad Guy"	US	Billie Eilish	2019
18× Platinum	1,260,000	"Love the Way You Lie"	US, Barbados	Eminem featuring Rihanna	2010
18× Platinum	1,260,000	"Pumped Up Kicks"	US	Foster The People	2012
18× Platinum	1,260,000	"Take Me to Church"	Ireland	Hozier	2014
17× Platinum	1,190,000	"All of Me"	US	John Legend	2013
17× Platinum	1,190,000	"Eastside"	US	Benny Blanco featuring Halsey and Khalid	2018
17× Platinum	1,190,000	"Moves like Jagger"	US	Maroon 5 featuring Christina Aguilera	2011
17× Platinum	1,190,000	"One Dance"	Canada, Nigeria, UK	Drake featuring Wizkid and Kyla	2016
17× Platinum	1,190,000	"Shape of You"	UK	Ed Sheeran	2017
17× Platinum	1,190,000	"Something Just Like This"	US, UK	The Chainsmokers and Coldplay	2017
17× Platinum	1,190,000	"Thunder"	US	Imagine Dragons	2017
17× Platinum	1,190,000	"We Found Love"	Barbados, UK	Rihanna featuring Calvin Harris	2011
17× Platinum	1,190,000	"Without Me"	US	Eminem	2002
16× Platinum	1,120,000	"Be Alright"	Australia	Dean Lewis	2018
16× Platinum	1,120,000	"Circles"	US	Post Malone	2019
16× Platinum	1,120,000	"Firework"	US	Katy Perry	2010
16× Platinum	1,120,000	The Love Club EP	New Zealand	Lorde	2013
16× Platinum	1,120,000	"Perfect"	UK	Ed Sheeran	2017
16× Platinum	1,120,000	"Riptide"	Australia	Vance Joy	2013
16× Platinum	1,120,000	"Save Your Tears"	Canada	The Weeknd	2020
16× Platinum	1,120,000	"Sex On Fire"	US	Kings of Leon	2008
16× Platinum	1,120,000	"Shallow"	US	Lady Gaga and Bradley Cooper	2019
16× Platinum	1,120,000	"Stay"	Australia, Canada	The Kid Laroi and Justin Bieber	2021
15× Platinum	1,050,000	"Believer"	US	Imagine Dragons	2017
15× Platinum	1,050,000	"Blank Space"	US	Taylor Swift	2014
15× Platinum	1,050,000	"Call Me Maybe"	Canada	Carly Rae Jepsen	2012
15× Platinum	1,050,000	"Cold Heart (PNAU Remix)"	UK, Albania	Elton John and Dua Lipa	2021
15× Platinum	1,050,000	"Dancing on My Own"	UK	Calum Scott	2016
15× Platinum	1,050,000	"Dreams"	UK, US	Fleetwood Mac	1977
15× Platinum	1,050,000	"Hey, Soul Sister"	US	Train	2010
15× Platinum	1,050,000	"Love Story"	US	Taylor Swift	2009
15× Platinum	1,050,000	"Love Yourself"	Canada	Justin Bieber	2016
15× Platinum	1,050,000	"Old Town Road"	US	Lil Nas X	2019
15× Platinum	1,050,000	"Party Rock Anthem"	US, UK	LMFAO featuring Lauren Bennett and GoonRock	2011
15× Platinum	1,050,000	"Poker Face"	US	Lady Gaga	2008
15× Platinum	1,050,000	"Shut Up and Dance"	US	Walk the Moon	2014
15× Platinum	1,050,000	"Starboy"	Canada, France	The Weeknd featuring Daft Punk	2016
15× Platinum	1,050,000	"Umbrella"	Barbados, US	Rihanna featuring Jay-Z	2007
15× Platinum	1,050,000	"Wake Me Up"	Sweden	Avicii	2013
15× Platinum	1,050,000	"Walking On A Dream"	Australia	Empire of the Sun	2008
14× Platinum	980,000	"Africa"	US	Toto	1983
14× Platinum	980,000	"Battle Scars"	Australia, US	Guy Sebastian featuring Lupe Fiasco	2011
14× Platinum	980,000	"Candle in the Wind 1997" / "Something About the Way You Look Tonight"	UK	Elton John	1997
14× Platinum	980,000	"Chasing Cars"	UK	Snow Patrol	2006
14× Platinum	980,000	"Humble"	US	Kendrick Lamar and Skrillex	2017
14× Platinum	980,000	"Just Dance"	US	Lady Gaga featuring Colby O'Donis	2008
14× Platinum	980,000	"Only Girl (In the World)"	Barbados	Rihanna	2010
14× Platinum	980,000	"Party in the U.S.A."	US	Miley Cyrus	2009
14× Platinum	980,000	"Rockstar"	US	Post Malone featuring 21 Savage	2017
14× Platinum	980,000	"Stay"	Barbados, US	Rihanna featuring Mikky Ekko	2012
14× Platinum	980,000	"Stay with Me"	UK	Sam Smith	2014
14× Platinum	980,000	"Wonderwall"	UK	Oasis	1995
13× Platinum	910,000	"All I Want for Christmas Is You"	US	Mariah Carey	1994
13× Platinum	910,000	"All the Stars"	US	Kendrick Lamar	2018
13× Platinum	910,000	"Can't Hold Us"	US	Macklemore & Ryan Lewis featuring Ray Dalton	2011
13× Platinum	910,000	"Cruel Summer"	US	Taylor Swift	2023
13× Platinum	910,000	"Dark Horse"	US	Katy Perry	2013
13× Platinum	910,000	"Diamonds"	Barbados	Rihanna	2012
13× Platinum	910,000	"Don't Stop Believin'"	US	Journey	1981
13× Platinum	910,000	"Drops Of Jupiter"	US	Train	2001
13× Platinum	910,000	"Girls Like You"	US	Maroon 5 featuring Cardi B	2018
13× Platinum	910,000	"Halo"	US	Beyoncé	2008
13× Platinum	910,000	"I Fall Apart"	US	Post Malone	2017
13× Platinum	910,000	"I Gotta Feeling"	US	The Black Eyed Peas	2009
13× Platinum	910,000	"Just Give Me a Reason"	US	Pink featuring Nate Ruess	2013
13× Platinum	910,000	"Lovely"	US	Billie Eilish and Khalid	2018
13× Platinum	910,000	"Payphone"	US	Maroon 5 featuring Wiz Khalifa	2012
13× Platinum	910,000	"Shotgun"	UK	George Ezra	2018
13× Platinum	910,000	"Sorry"	Canada	Justin Bieber	2015
13× Platinum	910,000	"Thinking Out Loud"	UK	Ed Sheeran	2014
13× Platinum	910,000	"Unforgettable"	Morocco, US	French Montana featuring Swae Lee	2017
13× Platinum	910,000	"What Makes You Beautiful"	UK	One Direction	2011
12× Platinum	840,000	"1955"	Australia	Hilltop Hoods featuring Montaigne and Tom Thum	2016
12× Platinum	840,000	"Another Love"	UK	Tom Odell	2012
12× Platinum	840,000	"As It Was"	UK	Harry Styles	2022
12× Platinum	840,000	"Beautiful Things"	US	Benson Boone	2024
12× Platinum	840,000	"Cosby Sweater"	Australia	Hilltop Hoods	2014
12× Platinum	840,000	"Don't Stop the Music"	Barbados	Rihanna	2007
12× Platinum	840,000	"God's Plan"	Canada	Drake	2018
12× Platinum	840,000	"The Hills"	Canada	The Weeknd	2015
12× Platinum	840,000	"S&M"	Barbados	Rihanna	2011
12× Platinum	840,000	"Sexy and I Know It"	US	LMFAO	2011
12× Platinum	840,000	"Smells Like Teen Spirit"	US	Nirvana	1991
12× Platinum	840,000	"Starships"	Trinidad and Tobago	Nicki Minaj	2012
12× Platinum	840,000	"Summertime Sadness"	US, France	Lana Del Rey and Cedric Gervais	2012
12× Platinum	840,000	"This Is What You Came For"	UK, Barbados	Calvin Harris featuring Rihanna	2016
12× Platinum	840,000	"Watermelon Sugar"	UK	Harry Styles	2020
11× Platinum	770,000	"All About That Bass"	US	Meghan Trainor	2014
11× Platinum	770,000	"Apologize"	US	Timbaland featuring OneRepublic	2007
11× Platinum	770,000	"Bad Romance"	US	Lady Gaga	2009
11× Platinum	770,000	"Big Jet Plane"	Australia	Angus & Julia Stone	2010
11× Platinum	770,000	"California Gurls"	US	Katy Perry featuring Snoop Dogg	2010
11× Platinum	770,000	"Can't Feel My Face"	Canada	The Weeknd	2015
11× Platinum	770,000	"Can't Stop the Feeling"	US	Justin Timberlake	2016
11× Platinum	770,000	"Crazy in Love"	US	Beyoncé	2003
11× Platinum	770,000	"Despacito"	Puerto Rico, Canada	Luis Fonsi and Daddy Yankee featuring Justin Bieber	2017
11× Platinum	770,000	"Don't You Worry Child"	Sweden	Swedish House Mafia featuring John Martin	2012
11× Platinum	770,000	"FourFiveSeconds"	Barbados, US, UK	Rihanna, Kanye West, and Paul McCartney	2015
11× Platinum	770,000	"Good 4 U"	US	Olivia Rodrigo	2021
11× Platinum	770,000	"Drivers License"	US	Olivia Rodrigo	2021
11× Platinum	770,000	"Enter Sandman"	US	Metallica	1991
11× Platinum	770,000	"Happy"	US	Pharrell Williams	2014
11× Platinum	770,000	"Hey Ya!"	US	Outkast	2003
11× Platinum	770,000	"I Ain't Worried"	US	OneRepublic	2022
11× Platinum	770,000	"I Knew You Were Trouble"	US	Taylor Swift	2012
11× Platinum	770,000	"Last Friday Night (T.G.I.F.)"	US	Katy Perry	2011
11× Platinum	770,000	"Last Night"	US	Morgan Wallen	2023
11× Platinum	770,000	"Livin' On A Prayer"	US	Bon Jovi	1986
11× Platinum	770,000	"Memories"	US	Maroon 5	2019
11× Platinum	770,000	"The Monster"	US, Barbados	Eminem featuring Rihanna	2013
11× Platinum	770,000	"Not Afraid"	US	Eminem	2010
11× Platinum	770,000	"The Real Slim Shady"	US	Eminem	2000
11× Platinum	770,000	"Skinny Love"	UK	Birdy	2011
11× Platinum	770,000	"Stitches"	Canada	Shawn Mendes	2015
11× Platinum	770,000	"Sugar"	US	Maroon 5	2015
11× Platinum	770,000	"Super Bass"	Trinidad and Tobago	Nicki Minaj	2011
11× Platinum	770,000	"Teenage Dream"	US	Katy Perry	2010
11× Platinum	770,000	"There's Nothing Holdin' Me Back"	Canada	Shawn Mendes	2017
11× Platinum	770,000	"Thrift Shop"	US	Macklemore & Ryan Lewis featuring Wanz	2012
11× Platinum	770,000	"Waves"	Australia	Dean Lewis	2016
11× Platinum	770,000	"What Do You Mean?"	Canada	Justin Bieber	2015
11× Platinum	770,000	"When the Party's Over"	US	Billie Eilish	2018
10× Platinum	700,000	"The A Team"	UK	Ed Sheeran	2011
10× Platinum	700,000	"Bad Habits"	UK	Ed Sheeran	2021
10× Platinum	700,000	"Better Now"	US	Post Malone	2018
10× Platinum	700,000	"Birds of a Feather"	US	Billie Eilish	2024
10× Platinum	700,000	"Congratulations"	US	Post Malone	2017
10× Platinum	700,000	"Espresso"	US	Sabrina Carpenter	2024
10× Platinum	700,000	"Flowers"	US	Miley Cyrus	2023
10× Platinum	700,000	"Gangnam Style"	South Korea	Psy	2012
10× Platinum	700,000	"Geronimo"	Australia	Sheppard	2014
10× Platinum	700,000	"Hall of Fame"	Ireland, US	The Script featuring Will.i.am	2012
10× Platinum	700,000	"Havana"	US	Camila Cabello featuring Young Thug	2017
10× Platinum	700,000	"The Horses"	Australia	Daryl Braithwaite	1991
10× Platinum	700,000	"Hot n Cold"	US	Katy Perry	2008
10× Platinum	700,000	"I'm Not the Only One"	UK	Sam Smith	2014
10× Platinum	700,000	"In da Club"	US	50 Cent	2003
10× Platinum	700,000	Into the Flame	Australia	Matt Corby	2011
10× Platinum	700,000	"Lean On"	US, France, Denmark	Major Lazer and DJ Snake featuring MØ	2015
10× Platinum	700,000	"Let You Down"	US	NF	2017
10× Platinum	700,000	"Let Me Love You"	France, Canada	DJ Snake featuring Justin Bieber	2016
10× Platinum	700,000	"The Less I Know the Better"	Australia	Tame Impala	2015
10× Platinum	700,000	"The Middle"	Germany, US	Zedd, Maren Morris and Grey	2018
10× Platinum	700,000	"The Nosebleed Section"	Australia	Hilltop Hoods	2003
10× Platinum	700,000	"Ocean Eyes"	US	Billie Eilish	2016
10× Platinum	700,000	"Radioactive"	US	Imagine Dragons	2013
10× Platinum	700,000	"Raise Your Glass"	US	Pink	2010
10× Platinum	700,000	"Señorita"	Canada, US	Shawn Mendes and Camila Cabello	2019
10× Platinum	700,000	"Single Ladies (Put a Ring on It)"	US	Beyoncé	2008
10× Platinum	700,000	"So What"	US	Pink	2008
10× Platinum	700,000	"Stick Season"	US	Noah Kahan	2022
10× Platinum	700,000	"We Are Never Ever Getting Back Together"	US	Taylor Swift	2012
10× Platinum	700,000	"Thunderstruck"	Australia	AC/DC	1990
10× Platinum	700,000	"Too Good At Goodbyes"	UK	Sam Smith	2017
10× Platinum	700,000	"Treat You Better"	Canada	Shawn Mendes	2016
10× Platinum	700,000	"WAP"	US	Cardi B featuring Megan Thee Stallion	2020
10× Platinum	700,000	"Style"	US	Taylor Swift	2015
10× Platinum	700,000	"Sweater Weather"	US	The Neighbourhood	2012
10× Platinum	700,000	"When It Rains It Pours"	US	Luke Combs	2017
10× Platinum	700,000	"Wow	US	Post Malone	2018
10× Platinum	700,000	"You Belong with Me"	US	Taylor Swift	2009
10× Platinum	700,000	"You Shook Me All Night Long"	Australia	AC/DC	1980
10× Platinum	700,000	"Young And Beautiful"	US	Lana Del Rey and Cedric Gervais	2013

== Entries by artist ==
The artist with the most songs certified 10× Platinum or higher in Australia is Rihanna, with eleven songs. The following artists have achieved three or more songs certified 10× Platinum or higher in Australia as lead artist or featured artist.

Entries	Artist	Songs
11	Rihanna	"Diamonds, "Don't Stop the Music", "FourFiveSeconds", "Love the Way You Lie", "The Monster", "Only Girl (In the World)", "S&M", "Stay", "This Is What You Came For", "Umbrella", "We Found Love"
8	Taylor Swift	"Blank Space", "Cruel Summer", "I Knew You Were Trouble", "Love Story", "Shake It Off", "Style", "We Are Never Ever Getting Back Together", "You Belong with Me"
7	Katy Perry	"California Gurls", "Dark Horse", "Firework", "Hot n Cold", "Last Friday Night (T.G.I.F.)", "Roar", "Teenage Dream"
7	Post Malone	"Better Now", "Circles", "Congratulations", "I Fall Apart", "Rockstar", "Sunflower", "Wow"
6	Eminem	"Lose Yourself", "Love the Way You Lie", "The Monster", "Not Afraid", "The Real Slim Shady", "Without Me"
6	Justin Bieber	"Despacito", "Let Me Love You", "Love Yourself", "Sorry", "Stay", "What Do You Mean?"
5	Billie Eilish	"Bad Guy", "Birds of a Feather", "Lovely", "Ocean Eyes", "When the Party's Over"
5	Ed Sheeran	"The A Team", "Bad Habits", "Perfect", "Shape of You", "Thinking Out Loud"
5	Maroon 5	"Girls Like You", "Memories", "Moves Like Jagger", "Payphone", "Sugar"
5	The Weeknd	"Blinding Lights", "Can't Feel My Face", "The Hills", "Save Your Tears", "Starboy"
4	Lady Gaga	"Bad Romance", "Just Dance", "Poker Face", "Shallow"
4	Shawn Mendes	"Señorita", "Stitches", "There's Nothing Holdin' Me Back", "Treat You Better"
3	Beyoncé	"Crazy in Love", "Halo", "Single Ladies (Put a Ring on It)"
3	Hilltop Hoods	"1955", "Cosby Sweater", "The Nosebleed Section"
3	Imagine Dragons	"Believer, "Radioactive", "Thunder"
3	OneRepublic	"Apologize", "Counting Stars", "I Ain't Worried"
3	Pink	"Just Give Me a Reason", "Raise Your Glass", "So What"
3	Sam Smith	"I'm Not the Only One", "Stay with Me", "Too Good at Goodbyes"

== See also ==
- Australian Recording Industry Association
- List of best-selling albums in Australia
