= Candy Paint (Post Malone song) =

Single by Post Malone

from the album Beerbongs & Bentleys and The Fate of the Furious: The Album
- Released: October 20, 2017
- Genre: Hip-hop
- Length: 3:42
- Label: Republic
- Songwriters: Austin Post; Louis Bell; Carl Rosen
- Producers: Post Malone; Louis Bell

Post Malone singles chronology
| "I Fall Apart" (2017) | "Candy Paint" (2017) | "Psycho" (2018) |

"Candy Paint" is a song by American musician Post Malone from the soundtrack of the 2017 action film The Fate of the Furious. The song was released alongside the film and the rest of the soundtrack for the film. It was later released by Republic Records on October 20, 2017, as the sixth and final single from the soundtrack and the second single from Malone's second studio album, Beerbongs & Bentleys (2018).

== Background ==
Aside from references to rides, "Candy Paint" also mentions Michael Scott, the Dunder Mifflin boss from The Office played by Steve Carell.

== Chart performance ==
"Candy Paint" debuted at number 84 on the Billboard Hot 100, later peaking at number 34.

== Charts ==
=== Weekly charts ===
| Chart (2017–2018) | Peak position |
|---|---|
| Australia (ARIA) | 19 |
| Canada Hot 100 (Billboard) | 27 |
| Czech Republic Singles Digital (ČNS IFPI) | 49 |
| Denmark (Tracklisten) | 18 |
| Hungary (Stream Top 40) | 32 |
| Ireland (IRMA) | 31 |
| Latvia (DigiTop100) | 20 |
| Netherlands (Single Top 100) | 82 |
| New Zealand (Recorded Music NZ) | 6 |
| Norway (VG-lista) | 38 |
| Philippines (Philippine Hot 100) | 87 |
| Portugal (AFP) | 39 |
| Slovakia Singles Digital (ČNS IFPI) | 55 |
| Sweden (Sverigetopplistan) | 39 |
| Switzerland (Schweizer Hitparade) | 97 |
| UK Singles (Official Charts) | 65 |
| US Billboard Hot 100 | 34 |
| US Hot R&B/Hip-Hop Songs (Billboard) | 21 |

=== Year-end charts ===
| Chart (2018) | Position |
|---|---|
| Australia (ARIA) | 45 |
| New Zealand (Recorded Music NZ) | 31 |
| US Hot R&B/Hip-Hop Songs (Billboard) | 62 |

== Certifications ==
| Region | Certification | Certified units/sales |
|---|---|---|
| Australia (ARIA) | 5× Platinum | 350,000^{‡} |
| Brazil (Pro-Música Brasil) | Gold | 30,000^{‡} |
| Canada (Music Canada) | 6× Platinum | 480,000^{‡} |
| Denmark (IFPI Danmark) | Platinum | 90,000^{‡} |
| Italy (FIMI) | Gold | 25,000^{‡} |
| Netherlands (NVPI) | Gold | 20,000^{‡} |
| New Zealand (RMNZ) | 5× Platinum | 150,000^{‡} |
| Portugal (AFP) | Gold | 5,000^{‡} |
| United Kingdom (BPI) | Platinum | 600,000^{‡} |
| United States (RIAA) | 3× Platinum | 3,000,000^{‡} |
Streaming
| Sweden (GLF) | Platinum | 8,000,000^{†} |
^{‡} Sales+streaming figures based on certification alone.^{†} Streaming-only figures based on certification alone.
