= Better Now =

2018 single by Post Malone

Single by Post Malone

from the album Beerbongs & Bentleys
- Released: May 25, 2018
- Genre: Pop rap; Trap
- Length: 3:50
- Label: Republic
- Songwriters: Austin Post; Louis Bell; Adam Feeney; William Walsh; Carl Rosen; Kaan Güneşberk
- Producers: Frank Dukes; Louis Bell

Post Malone singles chronology
"Jackie Chan" (2018)	"Better Now" (2018)	"Sunflower" (2018)

Music video
- "Better Now" on YouTube

"Better Now" is a song by American musician Post Malone from his second studio album, Beerbongs & Bentleys (2018). It was written by Malone, Billy Walsh, Louis Bell and Frank Dukes, with production handled by the latter two. The song was released to UK contemporary hit radio on May 25, 2018, and US contemporary hit radio on June 5, 2018, as the album's fifth and final single.

It reached the top 10 of the music charts in the United States, the United Kingdom, Australia, Ireland, and New Zealand. The song was nominated for Best Pop Solo Performance at the 61st Annual Grammy Awards.

== Music and recording ==
In an interview with Pitchfork, producer Frank Dukes revealed information about the song's creation, stating it was "frankensteined" out of existing scraps of other studio sessions with Malone. The song's verse melody was written first, but with no words, along with a completely different beat and hook. To them, the beat did not fit the melody, and its hook felt "awkward". The vocal engineer Louis Bell then remembered an unused snippet from an old session, which was the song's chorus. It replaced the old hook in the song, and Dukes rewrote a new backing track on guitar, taking inspiration from the American band Weezer.

"Better Now" is described as a pop song. The song's sheet music, published by EMI Music Publishing at Musicnotes, shows that the song is written in the key of B♭ major, and follows a tempo of 150 beats per minute. The vocals in the song span from the low note of F3 to the high note of G4.

== Chart performance ==
"Better Now" debuted in the top ten in various countries, including at number one in Norway, number seven in the United States, and number six in the United Kingdom, becoming his third top 10 in the latter country. The single became his fifth top 10 hit in Australia, peaking at number two. It peaked at number 3 in the United States (prevented from further chart movement by Juice WRLD's "Lucid Dreams" as well as Maroon 5 and Cardi B's "Girls Like You").

Taylor Swift told Malone that she wished she had written the song, especially giving praise to its hook.

== Music video ==
The official music video for "Better Now" premiered on October 5, 2018, with B&W footage of concert performances.

== Charts ==
=== Weekly charts ===
Weekly sales chart performance for "Better Now"
Chart (2018–2019)	Peak position
Australia (ARIA)	2
Australia Urban (ARIA)	2
Austria (Ö3 Austria Top 40)	4
Belarus Airplay (Eurofest)	3
Belgium (Ultratop 50 Flanders)	16
Belgium (Ultratop 50 Wallonia)	39
Bolivia (Monitor Latino)	15
Canada Hot 100 (Billboard)	3
Canada CHR/Top 40 (Billboard)	3
Canada Hot AC (Billboard)	21
Colombia (National-Report)	100
Croatia (HRT)	59
CIS Airplay (TopHit)	6
Czech Republic Airplay (ČNS IFPI)	19
Czech Republic Singles Digital (ČNS IFPI)	2
Denmark (Tracklisten)	3
Ecuador (National-Report)	13
Finland (Suomen virallinen lista)	2
France (SNEP)	53
Germany (GfK)	11
Greece International Digital (IFPI Greece)	9
Hungary (Stream Top 40)	4
Ireland (IRMA)	4
Italy (FIMI)	42
Japan Hot 100 (Billboard)	86
Lebanon (Lebanese Top 20)	14
Netherlands (Dutch Top 40)	9
Netherlands (Single Top 100)	5
New Zealand (Recorded Music NZ)	1
Norway (VG-lista)	1
Poland Airplay (ZPAV)	46
Portugal (AFP)	2
Romania (Airplay 100)	9
Russia Airplay (TopHit)	5
Scottish Singles Sales (Official Charts)	19
Singapore (RIAS)	27
Slovakia Airplay (ČNS IFPI)	33
Slovakia Singles Digital (ČNS IFPI)	1
South Korea International (Gaon)	69
Spain (Promusicae)	47
Sweden (Sverigetopplistan)	1
Switzerland (Schweizer Hitparade)	12
UK Singles (Official Charts)	6
UK Hip Hop/R&B (Official Charts)	1
Ukraine Airplay (TopHit)	97
US Billboard Hot 100	3
US Adult Pop Airplay (Billboard)	13
US Dance Airplay (Billboard)	2
US Hot R&B/Hip-Hop Songs (Billboard)	2
US Pop Airplay (Billboard)	1
US Radio Songs (Billboard)	2
US Rhythmic Airplay (Billboard)	2
US Rolling Stone Top 100	70

=== Year-end charts ===
Annual sales chart performance for "Better Now"
Chart (2018)	Position
Australia (ARIA)	11
Austria (Ö3 Austria Top 40)	16
Belgium (Ultratop Flanders)	52
Canada (Canadian Hot 100)	14
CIS (Tophit)	56
Denmark (Tracklisten)	10
Estonia (IFPI)	9
France (SNEP)	163
Germany (Official German Charts)	35
Iceland (Plötutíóindi)	36
Ireland (IRMA)	16
Italy (FIMI)	90
Netherlands (Dutch Top 40)	57
Netherlands (Single Top 100)	26
New Zealand (Recorded Music NZ)	12
Portugal (AFP)	8
Romania (Airplay 100)	80
Russia (Tophit)	36
Sweden (Sverigetopplistan)	9
Switzerland (Schweizer Hitparade)	31
UK Singles (Official Charts Company)	21
US Billboard Hot 100	13
US Dance/Mix Show Airplay (Billboard)	16
US Hot R&B/Hip-Hop Songs (Billboard)	8
US Mainstream Top 40 (Billboard)	7
US Radio Songs (Billboard)	15
US Rhythmic (Billboard)	6
Chart (2019)	Position
Australia (ARIA)	60
Canada (Canadian Hot 100)	42
Denmark (Tracklisten)	94
Latvia (LAIPA)	49
Portugal (AFP)	92
Romania (Airplay 100)	59
US Billboard Hot 100	32
US Hot R&B/Hip-Hop Songs (Billboard)	34
US Mainstream Top 40 (Billboard)	40
US Radio Songs (Billboard)	27
US Rolling Stone Top 100	38

=== Decade-end charts ===
Decade-end sales chart performance for "Better Now"
Chart (2010–2019)	Position
US Billboard Hot 100	72
US Hot R&B/Hip-Hop Songs (Billboard)	20

== Certifications ==
Sales certifications for "Better Now"
Region	Certification	Certified units/sales
Australia (ARIA)	10× Platinum	700,000^{‡}
Austria (IFPI Austria)	Platinum	30,000^{‡}
Belgium (BRMA)	Platinum	40,000^{‡}
Brazil (Pro-Música Brasil)	3× Diamond	480,000^{‡}
Canada (Music Canada)	Diamond	800,000^{‡}
Denmark (IFPI Danmark)	2× Platinum	180,000^{‡}
France (SNEP)	Diamond	333,333^{‡}
Germany (BVMI)	Platinum	400,000^{‡}
Italy (FIMI)	Platinum	50,000^{‡}
Mexico (AMPROFON)	2× Platinum	120,000^{‡}
Netherlands (NVPI)	2× Platinum	160,000^{‡}
New Zealand (RMNZ)	6× Platinum	180,000^{‡}
Norway (IFPI Norway)	Platinum	60,000^{‡}
Poland (ZPAV)	2× Platinum	100,000^{‡}
Portugal (AFP)	4× Platinum	40,000^{‡}
Spain (Promusicae)	Platinum	60,000^{‡}
United Kingdom (BPI)	3× Platinum	1,800,000^{‡}
United States (RIAA)	Diamond	10,000,000^{‡}
Streaming
Sweden (GLF)	Platinum	8,000,000^{†}
^{‡} Sales+streaming figures based on certification alone.^{†} Streaming-only figures based on certification alone.

== Release history ==
Release formats for "Better Now"
Region	Date	Format	Label	Ref.
United Kingdom	May 25, 2018	Contemporary hit radio	Republic	
United States	June 5, 2018	Contemporary hit radio	Republic	
Italy	June 15, 2018	Contemporary hit radio	Universal	
United States	June 25, 2018	Hot adult contemporary	Republic	

== See also ==
- List of highest-certified singles in Australia
