= Sunflower Dead =

American rock band

- Origin: California, U.S.
- Genres: Heavy metal, alternative metal, hard rock
- Years active: 2012–present
- Label: Bloody Bat
- Members: Michael Del Pizzo; Jaboo
- Website: sunflowerdead.com

Sunflower Dead is an American rock band from California featuring Jamie Teissere of Droid, Michael Del Pizzo, Rob Cisneros of Terror Universal, touring percussionist Jimmy Schultz and Jaboo of Two Hit Creeper. The self-titled album from the band was ranked Album of the Week by Revolver Magazine.

== Discography ==
=== Studio albums ===
- Sunflower Dead (2012)
- It's Time to Get Weird (2015)
- C O M A (2018)
- March of the Leper (2022)

=== Singles ===
- "Wasted" (2014)
- "Dance with Death" (2015)
- "It's Time To Get Weird" (2016) #40 Active Rock Charts
- "Victim" (2018) – No. 36 Mainstream Rock Songs
- "Turn Away" (2019) – No. 37 Mainstream Rock Songs
