= Ball for Me =

Single by Post Malone featuring Nicki Minaj

from the album Beerbongs & Bentleys
- Released: May 8, 2018
- Length: 3:27
- Label: Republic
- Songwriters: Austin Post; Onika Maraj; Louis Bell
- Producer: Louis Bell

Post Malone singles chronology
| "Psycho" (2018) | "Ball for Me" (2018) | "Jackie Chan" (2018) |

Nicki Minaj singles chronology
| "Anybody" (2018) | "Ball for Me" (2018) | "Big Bank" (2018) |

"Ball for Me" is a song by American musician Post Malone featuring Trinidadian rapper Nicki Minaj. It was written by the artists and producer Louis Bell. The song was released through Republic Records on May 8, 2018, as the fourth single from Malone's second studio album, Beerbongs & Bentleys (2018), the song was also featured on the soundtrack to the EA Sports video game, Madden NFL 19. The song debuted and peaked at number 16 on the US Billboard Hot 100, reached the top 10 in Canada and the top 20 in Australia and Slovakia.

== Music video ==
The official music video for "Ball for Me" was teased by Minaj through various social media platforms on June 27, 2018. Later on Queen Radio, Minaj confirmed that the music video wouldn't be released due to the fact that Malone didn't like his visuals.

== Credits and personnel ==
Credits adapted from Post Malone's official website.

- Post Malone – vocals, composition
- Nicki Minaj – vocals, composition
- Louis Bell – composition, production, programming, recording, vocal production
- Mike Bozzi – mastering
- Scott Desmarais – mixing assistance
- Robin Florent – mixing assistance
- Chris Galland – mixing assistance
- Manny Marroquin – mixing

== Charts ==
=== Weekly charts ===
| Chart (2018) | Peak position |
|---|---|
| Australia (ARIA) | 14 |
| Austria (Ö3 Austria Top 40) | 35 |
| Canada Hot 100 (Billboard) | 7 |
| Czech Republic Singles Digital (ČNS IFPI) | 47 |
| France (SNEP) | 198 |
| Germany (GfK) | 73 |
| Ireland (IRMA) | 23 |
| Italy (FIMI) | 92 |
| Netherlands (Single Top 100) | 61 |
| Norway (VG-lista) | 37 |
| Portugal (AFP) | 39 |
| Slovakia Singles Digital (ČNS IFPI) | 19 |
| Sweden (Sverigetopplistan) | 47 |
| UK Singles (OCC) | 70 |
| US Billboard Hot 100 | 16 |
| US Hot R&B/Hip-Hop Songs (Billboard) | 11 |
| US Rhythmic Airplay (Billboard) | 9 |

=== Year-end charts ===
| Chart (2018) | Position |
|---|---|
| Canada (Canadian Hot 100) | 82 |
| US Hot R&B/Hip-Hop Songs (Billboard) | 70 |

== Certifications ==
| Region | Certification | Certified units/sales |
|---|---|---|
| Australia (ARIA) | 2× Platinum | 140,000^{‡} |
| Brazil (Pro-Música Brasil) | Platinum | 40,000^{‡} |
| Canada (Music Canada) | 4× Platinum | 320,000^{‡} |
| New Zealand (RMNZ) | Platinum | 30,000^{‡} |
| United Kingdom (BPI) | Gold | 400,000^{‡} |
| United States (RIAA) | 3× Platinum | 3,000,000^{‡} |
^{‡} Sales+streaming figures based on certification alone.

== Release history ==
| Region | Date | Format | Label | Ref. |
|---|---|---|---|---|
| Various | April 27, 2018 | Digital download; streaming | Republic | |
| United States | May 8, 2018 | Rhythmic contemporary radio | Republic | |
