= Psycho (Post Malone song) =

2018 single by Post Malone featuring Ty Dolla Sign

Single by Post Malone featuring Ty Dolla Sign

from the album Beerbongs & Bentleys
- Released: February 23, 2018
- Genre: Pop rap
- Length: 3:41 (album version); 3:27 (radio edit)
- Label: Republic
- Songwriters: Austin Post; Tyrone Griffin; Louis Bell; Carl Rosen
- Producers: Post Malone; Louis Bell

Post Malone singles chronology
"Candy Paint" (2017)	"Psycho" (2018)	"Ball for Me" (2018)

Ty Dolla Sign singles chronology
"What You Think" (2018)	"Psycho" (2018)	"Me So Bad" (2018)

Music video
- "Psycho" on YouTube

"Psycho" is a song by American musician Post Malone featuring American singer Ty Dolla Sign. It was released through Republic Records on February 23, 2018, as the third single from Malone's second studio album, Beerbongs & Bentleys (2018). The artists wrote the song with Carl Rosen and Louis Bell, the latter producing it with Malone. Lyrically, the song discusses the artists' lifestyle and explores the theme of excessive fame and trust issues. The song entered at number two on the US Billboard Hot 100 behind Drake's "God's Plan", and reached number one in June 2018, becoming Malone's second and Ty's first chart-topper.

== Release and promotion ==
Malone first teased the song on January 4, 2017, with a video of him playing the song in a studio. Over a year later on February 21, 2018, he previewed the song on Twitter with a 30-second snippet, which highlights his verse. The accompanying artwork features a wolf and a bulldozer, the latter of which has the words "Posty Co." scribed on it. The song comes with its own merch line, featuring three different long sleeve T-shirts.

== Composition ==
According to Billboard and Spin, the song has a slow-moving trap beat and melodically bears a resemblance to Post Malone's 2015 song "White Iverson". The lyrics contain a reference to Leon DeChino, a musical alias Malone used in high school.

== Critical reception ==
Sheldon Pearce of Pitchfork deemed the song a combination of "some of the least interesting raps you could possibly imagine" and "a downer that won't quit", writing that it "uses concepts that have been played out in hip-hop for years". Patrick Hosken of MTV News opined that the song "finds a late-night vibe that, away from the madness of crunching guitars, unfolds like a chill celebration of luxury". Mitch Findlay of HotNewHipHop wrote that it "continues the formula set by" Post Malone's previous single "Rockstar", and that they share "a few melodic similarities", describing "Psycho" as "more subdued" in comparison. The track was named the worst song of 2018 by Time.

== Music video ==
The official music video for "Psycho" was released on March 22, 2018, on Post Malone's Vevo YouTube channel. It was directed by James DeFina. It features Malone riding on a FV103 Spartan armored personnel carrier, in what appears to be a post apocalyptic world. Before fighting a wolf with a flamethrower when trying to rescue a homeless little girl. While Ty is revealed to be inside of the tank, and gets out with Malone amidst the wreckage of ruined aircraft.

== Credits and personnel ==
Credits adapted from Tidal.

- Post Malone – production, programming, vocals
- Ty Dolla Sign – vocals
- Louis Bell – production, programming, record engineering, vocal production
- Manny Marroquin – mixing

== Charts ==
=== Weekly charts ===
Chart (2018)	Peak position
Australia (ARIA)	1
Austria (Ö3 Austria Top 40)	5
Belgium (Ultratop 50 Flanders)	15
Belgium (Ultratip Bubbling Under Wallonia)	1
Canada Hot 100 (Billboard)	1
Colombia (National-Report)	89
Czech Republic Singles Digital (ČNS IFPI)	4
Denmark (Tracklisten)	2
El Salvador (Monitor Latino)	14
Finland (Suomen virallinen lista)	4
France (SNEP)	39
Germany (GfK)	6
Greece (IFPI Greece)	4
Hungary (Single Top 40)	27
Hungary (Stream Top 40)	2
Ireland (IRMA)	2
Italy (FIMI)	18
Lebanon (Lebanese Top 20)	16
Malaysia (RIM)	6
Netherlands (Dutch Top 40)	18
Netherlands (Single Top 100)	8
New Zealand (Recorded Music NZ)	2
Norway (VG-lista)	2
Portugal (AFP)	3
Scottish Singles Sales (Official Charts)	23
Singapore (RIAS)	19
Slovakia Singles Digital (ČNS IFPI)	1
Spain (PROMUSICAE)	62
Sweden (Sverigetopplistan)	1
Switzerland (Schweizer Hitparade)	11
UK Singles (Official Charts)	4
US Billboard Hot 100	1
US Adult Pop Airplay (Billboard)	36
US Dance Airplay (Billboard)	5
US Hot R&B/Hip-Hop Songs (Billboard)	1
US Pop Airplay (Billboard)	1
US Rhythmic Airplay (Billboard)	1

=== Year-end charts ===
Chart (2018)	Position
Australia (ARIA)	7
Austria (Ö3 Austria Top 40)	57
Belgium (Ultratop Flanders)	70
Canada (Canadian Hot 100)	8
Denmark (Tracklisten)	17
Estonia (IFPI)	11
France (SNEP)	170
Germany (Official German Charts)	74
Ireland (IRMA)	24
Italy (FIMI)	91
Netherlands (Single Top 100)	70
New Zealand (Recorded Music NZ)	4
Portugal (AFP)	18
South Korea International (Gaon)	100
Sweden (Sverigetopplistan)	14
Switzerland (Schweizer Hitparade)	89
UK Singles (Official Charts Company)	22
US Billboard Hot 100	6
US Dance/Mix Show Airplay (Billboard)	15
US Hot R&B/Hip-Hop Songs (Billboard)	4
US Mainstream Top 40 (Billboard)	12
US Rhythmic (Billboard)	5
Worldwide (IFPI)	10

Chart (2019)	Position
US Rolling Stone Top 100	100

=== Decade-end charts ===
Chart (2010–2019)	Position
US Billboard Hot 100	79
US Hot R&B/Hip-Hop Songs (Billboard)	50

== Certifications ==
Region	Certification	Certified units/sales
Australia (ARIA)	9× Platinum	630,000^{‡}
Belgium (BRMA)	Gold	10,000^{‡}
Brazil (Pro-Música Brasil)	2× Diamond	320,000^{‡}
Canada (Music Canada)	Diamond	800,000^{‡}
Denmark (IFPI Danmark)	2× Platinum	180,000^{‡}
Germany (BVMI)	Gold	200,000^{‡}
Italy (FIMI)	Platinum	50,000^{‡}
Mexico (AMPROFON)	2× Platinum	120,000^{‡}
Netherlands (NVPI)	Platinum	80,000^{‡}
New Zealand (RMNZ)	5× Platinum	150,000^{‡}
Norway (IFPI Norway)	Platinum	60,000^{‡}
Poland (ZPAV)	Gold	25,000^{‡}
Portugal (AFP)	2× Platinum	20,000^{‡}
Spain (Promusicae)	Gold	30,000^{‡}
United Kingdom (BPI)	2× Platinum	1,200,000^{‡}
United States (RIAA)	Diamond	10,000,000^{‡}
Streaming
Sweden (GLF)	Platinum	8,000,000^{†}
^{‡} Sales+streaming figures based on certification alone.^{†} Streaming-only figures based on certification alone.

== Release history ==
Region	Date	Format	Label	Ref.
Various	February 23, 2018	Digital download; streaming	Republic	
United States	February 27, 2018	Rhythmic contemporary radio	Republic	
