= Louis Bell =

American record producer (born 1982)

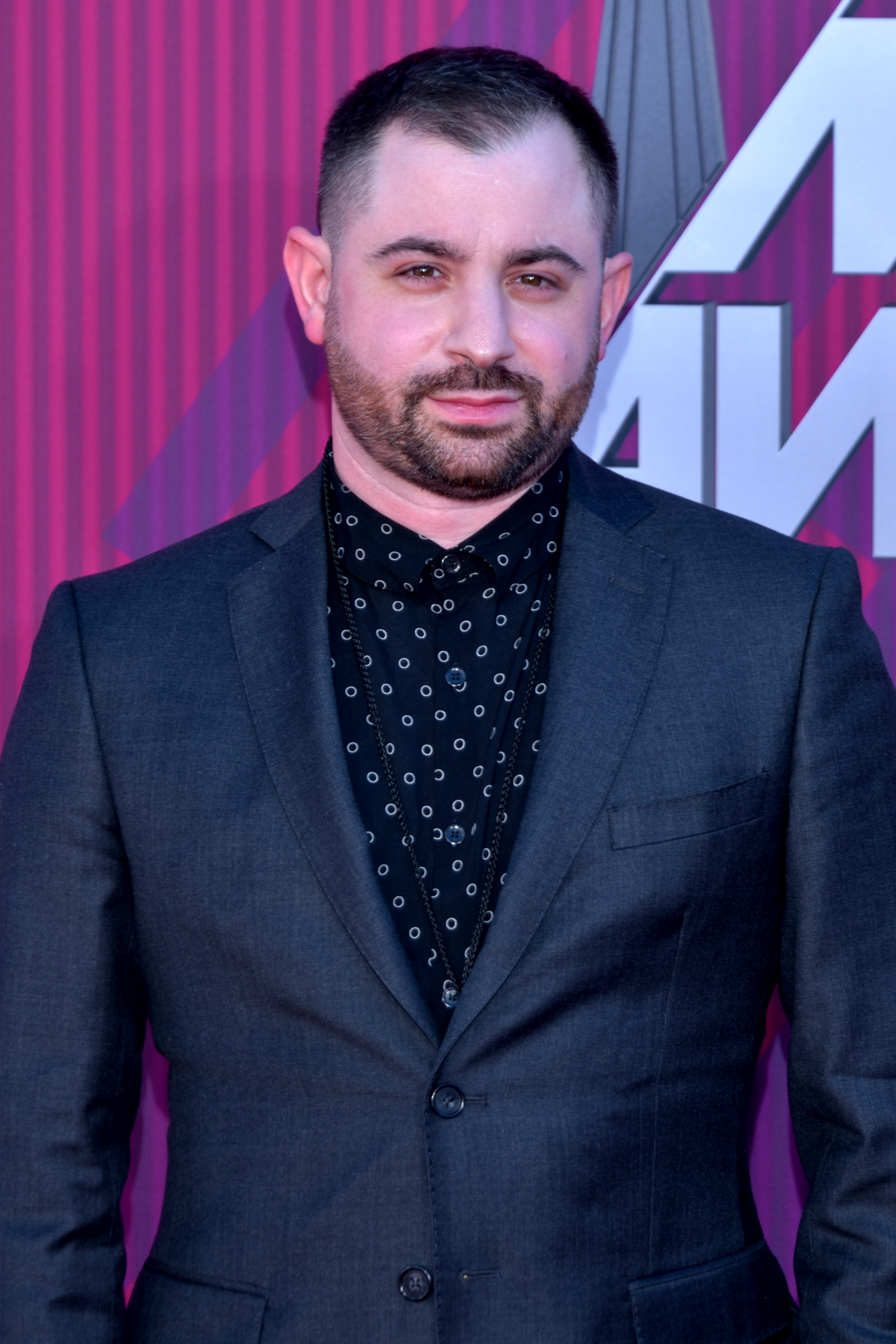
- Bell at the 2019 iHeartRadio Music Awards

Background information
- Born: Louis Russell Bell; May 27, 1982 (age 44); Quincy, Massachusetts, U.S.
- Genres: Pop; R&B; hip hop; rock
- Occupations: Record producer; vocal producer; songwriter; mixing engineer
- Years active: 2003–present
- Labels: Electric Feel; Universal

Louis Russell Bell (born May 27, 1982) is an American record producer, vocal producer, songwriter, and mixing engineer. His work includes production for Post Malone, Camila Cabello, Halsey, Justin Bieber, Miley Cyrus, 5 Seconds of Summer, Taylor Swift, Juice Wrld, DJ Khaled, Kanye West and Frank Dukes among others. A producer and writer specializing in various genres, Bell has been credited on 22 songs that have peaked within the Billboard Hot 100's top ten, including 10 number ones. Billboard called Bell's impact on the top of the charts "historic" and labeled him "pop's most prolific, accomplished and untethered freelancer of 2019".

== Life and career ==
=== Early life ===
Louis Bell was born on May 27, 1982, in Quincy, Massachusetts. He began taking piano lessons at the age of 11 and used this skill to make beats with a keyboard and the audio software Fruity Loops, which led to him developing himself as a rapper and recording himself on the computer and eventually opening his own studio in Boston where he worked with dozens of artists.

=== Career ===
In 2013, Bell moved to Los Angeles after signing with his manager Austin Rosen, CEO/Founder of Electric Feel Management. After some time working together in the studio, Bell and artist Post Malone quickly realized they had a great chemistry, and the same vision musically. The duo continued to work together on Post Malone's debut album Stoney and multiple singles including "Congratulations" that gained popularity in late 2015.

Bell's career took off in January 2016 when Justin Bieber visited him, Malone, and fellow producer Frank Dukes in the studio while finishing the Stoney album and the resulting product was the single "Deja Vu".

In August 2016, Bell's first hit song, "Let Me Love You" by Justin Bieber, DJ Snake, and co-written with a longtime collaborator Andrew Watt, made its chart-topping debut. Bell co-wrote and vocal produced the Frank Dukes & Metro Boomin co-production "Congratulations", Stoney's lead single, which debuted at Top 10 on the Billboard Hot 100 Chart followed by "Rockstar", the lead single of Malone's second album, Beerbongs & Bentleys, which held the No. 1 spot on Billboard's Hot 100 chart for eight straight weeks.

Bell has also collaborated with numerous artists including PartyNextDoor, Tyga, Juvenile, Sugar Ray, Mike Stud, OMI, Joe Budden, Andrew Watt, and many more. Bell earned a spot on Variety's 2017 Hitmakers list for his work on Malone's "Congratulations", Kygo's collaboration with Selena Gomez's "It Ain't Me", and Camila Cabello's and Young Thug's "Havana".

On July 6, 2019, Bell became only the second person to top Billboard's newly launched Hot 100 Producer chart. This was thanks to four Hot 100 charting titles, on which Bell is credited as a producer. He also reached number 3 on the Hot 100 Songwriters chart, thanks to his five songwriting credits on the Hot 100, later topping this chart on September 21, 2019.

Bell signed an exclusive publishing deal with Universal Music Publishing Group in January 2021. In April 2023, Bell became the first songwriter to have eight RIAA diamond certified singles. He is one of several artists involved in UMG's AI music incubator.

== Production and songwriting credits ==
Year	Artist	Song(s)	Album	Label	Production credit
2024	Post Malone	All Tracks (1-27)	F-1 Trillion	Republic Records, Mercury Records	Co-producer, co-writer, engineer, vocal producer, programmer
2024	Taylor Swift	"Fortnight" (featuring Post Malone)	The Tortured Poets Department	Republic Records	Vocal producer, vocal engineer
2024	Justin Timberlake	"Drown", "My Favorite Drug", "Imagination", "Selfish", "Conditions"	Everything I Thought It Was	RCA	Co-producer, co-writer, vocal producer, recording engineer, drum programming
2023	Post Malone	All Tracks (1–18)	Austin (album)	Republic Records, Mercury Records	Co-producer, co-writer, recording engineer, programmer, keyboard, drum programming
2023	The Kid Laroi	"Forever & Again"	Barbie the Album	Atlantic	Co-producer, co-writer, recording engineer, programmer, keyboard, drum programming
2023	Taylor Swift	"All of the Girls You Loved Before"	N/A	Republic Records	Co-producer, co-writer, recording engineer, programmer
2022	Post Malone	All Tracks (1–16)	Twelve Carat Toothache	Republic Records, Mercury Records	Co-writer, co-producer, programmer (1–16), drums (2, 8, 13); keyboards, synthesizer (8, 13); bass (8), choir arrangement (9); synth bass, synth pads (13)
2021	Kanye West	"Ok Ok", "Ok Ok pt 2"	Donda	Def Jam	Producer, vocal editing
2021	Kanye West	"Jail", "God Breathed", "Off the Grid", "Hurricane", "Praise God", "Jonah", "Believe What I Say", "24", "Remote Control", "Moon", "Heaven and Hell", "Donda", "Keep My Spirit Alive", "Jesus Lord", "New Again", "Lord I Need You", "Pure Souls", "Come To Life", "No Child Left Behind", "Jail Pt 2", "Jesus Lord Pt 2"	Donda	Def Jam	Vocal editing
2021	Maroon 5	"Can't Leave You Alone" (featuring Juice Wrld)	Jordi	Interscope	Producer, writer
2021	One Republic	"Forgot About You"	Human	Interscope	Producer, writer
2021	Swae Lee	"In the Dark" (featuring Jhené Aiko)	Shang-Chi and the Legend of the Ten Rings (soundtrack)	Marvel Music / Hollywood Records / Interscope Records	Producer, writer
2021	Post Malone	"Motley Crew"	N/A	Republic Records	Producer, writer
2021	24kGoldn	"Love or Lust"	El Dorado	Columbia Records	Producer, writer
2021	DJ Khaled	"I Did It" (featuring Post Malone, Meg Thee Stallion, DaBaby, and Lil Baby)	Khaled Khaled	We the Best / Epic	Writer
2021	Justin Bieber	"Deserve You", "Hold On", "Die for You" (featuring Dominic Fike), "Hailey", "I Can't Be Myself" (featuring Jaden)	Justice	Def Jam	Producer, writer
2021	Justin Bieber	"Peaches" (featuring Daniel Caesar and Giveon)	Justice	Def Jam	Writer
2020	Sam Smith	"Kids Again"	Love Goes	Capitol Records	Producer, writer
2020	Ty Dolla Sign	"Spicy" (featuring Post Malone)	Featuring Ty Dolla $ign	Atlantic	Writer
2020	Miley Cyrus	"WTF Do I Know", "Plastic Hearts", "Angels like You", "Gimme What I Want", "Midnight Sky", "Hate Me"	Plastic Hearts	RCA	Producer, writer
2020	5 Seconds of Summer	"Easier" (released in 2019) "Teeth" (released in 2019) "High" "Old Me"	Calm	Interscope	Producer, writer, vocal producer
2020	Ozzy Osbourne	"It's a Raid"	Ordinary Man	Epic	Producer, writer
2020	A Boogie wit da Hoodie	"Me and my Guitar"	Artist 2.0	Atlantic	Producer, writer
2020	Halsey	"Without Me" (featuring Juice WRLD) "Graveyard" "Still Learning"	Manic	Capitol	Producer, writer, vocal producer
2020	Justin Bieber	"Forever" (featuring Post Malone & Clever)	Changes	Def Jam	Writer, vocal producer, recording engineer
2019	Ramage	"Ya Lil" (featuring Nicki Minaj)	Al Anesa Farah - Music from the Original TV Series	Republic Records, UMG, SeVeN Pictures, Universal Music MENA, Universal Arabic Music	Producer, writer, vocal producer
2019	Camila Cabello	"Cry for Me" "Easy" "Feel It Twice" "Should've Said It" "My Oh My" (featuring DaBaby)	Romance	Epic, Syco	Producer, writer
2019	French Montana	"Writing On The Wall" (featuring Post Malone, Cardi B, & Rvssian)	Montana	Epic	Producer, writer, vocal producer, mixer
2019	Charlie Puth	"Mother"	N/A	Artist Partner and Atlantic Records	Producer, writer, vocal producer
2019	Lana Del Rey	"Fuck It, I Love You"	Norman Fucking Rockwell!	Interscope Records	Producer
2019	Taylor Swift	"I Forgot That You Existed" "Afterglow" "It's Nice to Have a Friend"	Lover	Republic Records	Co-producer, co-writer, recording engineer, programmer
2019	Charlotte Lawrence	"Why Do You Love Me"	N/A	Atlantic Records, Gold Tooth Records	Producer, writer, vocal producer
2019	Post Malone	Tracks 1–12; including "Goodbyes" (feat. Young Thug) and "Wow."	Hollywood's Bleeding	Republic Records	Producer, writer, vocal Producer
2019	Rich The Kid	"Ring Ring" (feat. Vory)	The World Is Yours 2	Interscope Records	Producer, writer
2019	Julia Michaels	"17" "Body"	Inner Monologue Part 2	Republic Records	Producer, writer, vocal producer
2019	Delacey	"My Man" (Louis Bell Remix)	N/A	Hitco	Producer, vocal editing
2019	Vory	"You Got It"	N/A	Capitol Records	Producer, writer
2019	Juice Wrld	"Fast"	Death Race for Love	Grade A Productions, Interscope Records	Producer, writer, vocal producer
2019	Jonas Brothers	"Sucker"	Happiness Begins	Republic Records	Writer
2019	Jonas Brothers	"Used To Be"	Happiness Begins	Republic Records	Producer, writer
2019	Lil Peep & iLoveMakonnen (feat. Fall Out Boy)	"I've Been Waiting"	N/A	AUTNMY, Columbia Records	Producer, writer, vocal producer
2019	Julia Michaels	"Into You"	Inner Monologue Part 1	Republic Records	Producer, writer, vocal producer
2019	DJ Khaled ft Post Malone & Travis Scott	"Celebrate"	Father of Asahd	Epic Records	
2018	21 Savage	"all my friends"	i am > i was	Slaughter Gang, Epic	Producer, writer, vocal producer, mixer
2018	Rita Ora	"Only Want You", "Hell of a Life"	Phoenix	Atlantic Records UK	Producer, writer, vocal producer
2018	Jaden Smith	"FALLEN Part 2"	The Sunset Tapes: A Cool Tape Story	MSFTSMusic, Roc Nation	Producer, writer
2018	Lil Wayne (feat. Post Malone or Sosamann)	"What About Me"	Tha Carter V	Young Money Entertainment	Writer
2018	Vince Staples (feat. Ty Dolla $ign)	"Feels Like Summer"	FM!	Def Jam Recordings	Producer, writer
2018	Little Mix	"Think About Us", "American Boy"	LM5	Syco	Producer
2018	Future & Juice Wrld	"Jet Lag", "Hard Work Pays Off"	Wrld on Drugs	Epic, Freebandz, Grade A, Interscope Records	Producer, writer, vocal producer
2018	Post Malone & Swae Lee	"Sunflower"	Spider-Man: Into the Spider-Verse (Soundtrack from & Inspired by the Motion Picture)	Republic Records	Producer, writer, vocal producer
2018	Jess Glynne	"No One"	Always in Between	Atlantic Records UK	Producer
2018	Camila Cabello (feat. Swae Lee)	"Real Friends" (reimagined version)	N/A	Epic, Syco	Producer, writer, vocal producer, mixing
2018	Bazzi (feat. Camila Cabello)	"Beautiful"	N/A	Atlantic Records	Vocal editing
2018	Benny Blanco, Halsey & Khalid	"Eastside"	Friends Keep Secrets	Friends Keep Secrets / Interscope Records	Vocal editing
2018	Bebe Rexha (feat. Tory Lanez)	"Steady"	Expectations	Warner Bros. Records	Producer, writer
2018	Why Don't We	"Hooked"	8 Letters	Atlantic Records	Vocal producer
2018	Tiësto & Dzeko (feat. Preme & Post Malone)	"Jackie Chan"	The London Sessions	Musical Freedom Ltd.	Writer, vocal producer
2018	Kris Wu	"Like That"	Antares	Interscope Records	Writer
2018	Dice SoHo (feat. Vory)	"She Will"	You Could Have	M.W.A	Producer, writer, vocal producer
2018	Jess Glynne	"I'll Be There"	Always in Between	Atlantic Records	Producer
2018	Preme (feat. Post Malone)	"Jackie Chan"	Light of Day	RCA Records	Producer, writer, vocal producer
2018	Post Malone	"Paranoid", "Spoil My Night", "Rich & Sad", "Zack and Codeine", "Takin' Shots", "Over Now", "Psycho", "Better Now", "Ball for Me", "Otherside", "Stay", "Blame It on Me", "Same Bitches", "Jonestown (Interlude)","92 Explorer", "Sugar Wraith"	Beerbongs & Bentleys	Republic Records	Executive producer, writer, vocal producer
2018	Khalid, Ty Dolla Sign & 6lack	"OTW"	N/A	LVRN / Interscope Records	Vocal producer
2018	5 Seconds of Summer	"Youngblood"	Youngblood	Capitol Records	Producer, writer, vocal producer
2018	Cardi B	"Thru Your Phone"	Invasion of Privacy	Atlantic Records	Vocal producer
2018	Shawn Mendes	"Lost in Japan"	Shawn Mendes	Island Records	Producer
2018	Halsey (feat. Big Sean & Stefflon Don)	"Alone"	Hopeless Fountain Kingdom	Astrelwerks	Producer
2018	Camila Cabello	"Never Be the Same"	Camila	Epic, Syco	Vocal editing
2018	Camila Cabello	"All These Years" "Inside Out"	Camila	Epic, Syco	Vocal producer
2018	Camila Cabello	"She Loves Control" "Into It" "Real Friends"	Camila	Epic, Syco	Writer, vocal producer
2017	Chris Brown	"Hands Up", "On Purpose"	Heartbreak on a Full Moon	RCA Records	Writer
2017	Camila Cabello (feat. Young Thug)	"Havana"	Camila	Epic, Syco	Writer, vocal producer
2017	Camila Cabello & Grey	"Crown"	Bright: The Album	Atlantic Records	Vocal producer
2017	Post Malone (feat. 21 Savage)	"Rockstar"	Beerbongs & Bentleys	Republic Records	Producer, writer, vocal producer
2017	Post Malone	"Candy Paint"	The Fate of the Furious: The Album	APG, Atlantic, UMG	Producer, writer, vocal producer
2017	Kris Wu (feat. Travis Scott)	"Deserve"	Antares	KRIS WU STUDIO	Producer, writer
2017	Lorde (feat. Khalid, Post Malone & SZA)	"Homemade Dynamite (Remix)"	N/A	UMG	Writer, vocal producer
2017	Kygo & Selena Gomez	"It Ain't Me"	Stargazing	Sony, Ultra	Vocal producer
2017	Odesza (feat. WYNNE & Mansionair)	"Line of Sight"	A Moment Apart	Counter, Ninja Tune, Foreign Family Collective	Producer, writer, vocal producer
2017	DJ Snake	"Oh Me Oh My", "4 Life", "Let Me Love You"	Encore	Interscope	Producer, writer, vocal producer
2017	Selena Gomez & Marshmello	"Wolves"	N/A	Interscope	Writer, vocal producer
2016	Post Malone	"Big Lie", "Deja Vu", "No Option", "Patient", "Congratulations", "Up There", "Yours Truly, Austin Post", "Feeling Whitney"	Stoney	Republic	Producer, writer, vocal producer
2016	Post Malone	"Money Made Me Do It", "Git Wit U", "Hollywood Dreams" / "Come Down"	August 26	Republic	Producer, writer, vocal producer

== Accolades ==
=== Grammy Awards ===
Year	Category	Work	Result	Ref.
2018	Best dance recording	"Line Of Sight"	Nominated	
2018	Best dance/electronic album	A Moment Apart	Nominated	
2019	Album of the Year	Beerbongs & Bentleys	Nominated	
2019	Record of the Year	"Rockstar"	Nominated	
2019	Best Rap/Sung Performance	"Rockstar"	Nominated^{[a]}	
2019	Best Pop Vocal Album	Camila	Nominated^{[a]}	
2019	Best Pop Solo Performance	''Better Now''	Nominated	
2020	Album of the Year	Norman Fucking Rockwell!	Nominated^{[a]}	
2020	Best Pop Vocal Album	Lover	Nominated^{[a]}	
2020	Record of the Year	"Sunflower"	Nominated	
2020	Best Pop Duo/Group Performance	"Sunflower"	Nominated^{[a]}	
2020	Best Pop Duo/Group Performance	"Sucker"	Nominated	
2021	Album of the Year	Hollywood's Bleeding	Nominated	
2021	Record of the Year	"Circles"	Nominated	
2021	Song of the Year	"Circles"	Nominated	
2022	Record of the Year	''Peaches''	Nominated	
2022	Song of the Year	''Peaches''	Nominated	
2022	Best R&B Performance	''Peaches''	Nominated	
2022	Album of the Year	Justice	Nominated	
2022	Best Rap Album	Donda	Nominated	
2022	Album of the Year	Donda	Nominated	
2023	Best Pop Duo/Group Performance	''I Like You (A Happier Song)''	Nominated	
2025	Record of the Year	''Fortnight''	Nominated	
2025	Best Country Song	''I Had Some Help''	Nominated	
2025	Best Country Duo/Group Performance	''I Had Some Help''	Nominated	
2025	Best Country Album	F-1 Trillion	Nominated	

^{^[a]}Grammy Award Winner Certificate-eligible nominations, as opposed to statuette-eligible.

=== iHeartRadio Music Awards ===
Year	Category	Work	Result
2019	Producer of the Year	Himself	Won
2019	Songwriter of the Year	Himself	Nominated
2020	Producer of the Year	Himself	Nominated
2020	Songwriter of the Year	Himself	Won
2021	Producer of the Year	Himself	Nominated
2023	Producer of the Year	Himself	Nominated
