= I Fall Apart =

Single by Post Malone

from the album Stoney
- Released: October 17, 2017
- Length: 3:43
- Label: Republic
- Songwriters: Austin Post; William Walsh; Carlo Montagnese
- Producer: Illangelo

Post Malone singles chronology
"Homemade Dynamite (Remix)" (2017)	"I Fall Apart" (2017)	"Candy Paint" (2017)

"I Fall Apart" is a song by American musician Post Malone. It was sent to rhythmic contemporary radio through Republic Records on October 17, 2017, as the sixth and final single from his debut studio album, Stoney (2016). Malone wrote the song with producer Illangelo alongside Billy Walsh. A viral performance was released on social media.

== Background ==
"I Fall Apart" was included on Post Malone's 2016 album, Stoney, and never originally released as a single, but a live performance of the song on September 24, 2017, went viral on social media.

== Chart performance ==
The song peaked at number 16 on the Billboard Hot 100 and peaked at number 19 on the UK Singles Chart, making it Post Malone's highest-charting single from Stoney in the United Kingdom.

== Charts ==
=== Weekly charts ===
Chart (2017–2018)	Peak position
Australia (ARIA)	2
Austria (Ö3 Austria Top 40)	57
Canada Hot 100 (Billboard)	20
Czech Republic Singles Digital (ČNS IFPI)	39
Denmark (Tracklisten)	36
Germany (GfK)	84
Ireland (IRMA)	15
Latvia (DigiTop100)	7
Netherlands (Single Top 100)	73
New Zealand (Recorded Music NZ)	1
Norway (VG-lista)	28
Philippines (BillboardPH Hot 100)	33
Portugal (AFP)	18
Scotland Singles (OCC)	57
Slovakia Singles Digital (ČNS IFPI)	37
Sweden (Sverigetopplistan)	16
Switzerland (Schweizer Hitparade)	94
UK Singles (OCC)	19
UK Hip Hop/R&B (OCC)	7
US Billboard Hot 100	16
US Hot R&B/Hip-Hop Songs (Billboard)	9
US Pop Airplay (Billboard)	30
US Rhythmic Airplay (Billboard)	5

=== Year-end charts ===
Chart (2017)	Position
Australia (ARIA)	73
US Hot R&B/Hip-Hop Songs (Billboard)	81
Chart (2018)	Position
Australia (ARIA)	6
Canada (Canadian Hot 100)	48
Estonia (IFPI)	48
New Zealand (Recorded Music NZ)	6
Portugal (AFP)	71
Sweden (Sverigetopplistan)	70
UK Singles (Official Charts Company)	71
US Billboard Hot 100	39
US Hot R&B/Hip-Hop Songs (Billboard)	28
US Rhythmic (Billboard)	31
Chart (2019)	Position
Australia (ARIA)	83
US Rolling Stone Top 100	84

=== Decade-end charts ===
Chart (2010–2019)	Position
Australia (ARIA)	52

== Certifications ==
Region	Certification	Certified units/sales
Australia (ARIA)	13× Platinum	910,000^{‡}
Brazil (Pro-Música Brasil)	Platinum	60,000^{‡}
Canada (Music Canada)	Diamond	800,000^{‡}
Denmark (IFPI Danmark)	Platinum	90,000^{‡}
France (SNEP)	Gold	100,000^{‡}
Germany (BVMI)	Gold	200,000^{‡}
Italy (FIMI)	Gold	25,000^{‡}
New Zealand (RMNZ)	9× Platinum	270,000^{‡}
Poland (ZPAV)	Gold	25,000^{‡}
Portugal (AFP)	2× Platinum	20,000^{‡}
Spain (Promusicae)	Gold	30,000^{‡}
United Kingdom (BPI)	3× Platinum	1,800,000^{‡}
United States (RIAA)	Diamond	10,000,000^{‡}
Streaming
Sweden (GLF)	2× Platinum	16,000,000^{†}
^{‡} Sales+streaming figures based on certification alone.^{†} Streaming-only figures based on certification alone.

== Release history ==
Country	Date	Format	Label
United States	December 9, 2016	Digital download	Republic
United States	October 17, 2017	Rhythmic contemporary radio	Republic
United States	December 12, 2017	Contemporary hit radio	Republic

== See also ==
- List of highest-certified singles in Australia
