= 2018 in hip-hop =

This article summarizes the events, album releases, and album release dates in hip-hop for the year 2018.

== Events ==
=== January ===
- On January 10, Baton Rouge rapper Kevin Gates was released from prison on parole after serving nine months of a 30-month sentence for gun possession.
- On January 19, Chicago rapper Fredo Santana died in Los Angeles from a seizure.

=== February ===
- On February 10, Ensayne Wayne, a multi-platinum producer from Memphis, was killed in a shooting in Atlanta.

=== March ===
- On March 2, Rick Ross was hospitalized due to possible pneumonia.
- On March 13, Craig Mack died from congestive heart failure.

=== April ===
- On April 16, Damn by Kendrick Lamar won the 2018 Pulitzer Prize for Music, making Lamar the first non-jazz or classical artist to win the award.
- On April 24, Meek Mill was released from prison.

=== May ===
- On May 19, Offset was hospitalised following a car accident in Atlanta, Georgia. He was released from the hospital a couple days later.
- On May 27, Brockhampton announced that Ameer Vann would no longer be a part of the group following his sexual misconduct allegations. He would be the first member to leave the group since the success of their Saturation trilogy.
- On May 29, Trippie Redd and Lil Wop were arrested in Atlanta allegedly over a brawl with rapper FDM Grady.

=== June ===
- On June 9, Lil Kim filed for bankruptcy, having a total of $4 million in debt.
- On June 12, XXL released their eleventh annual freshman list, including Lil Pump, Smokepurpp, BlocBoy JB, Stefflon Don, Wifisfuneral, YBN Nahmir, Trippie Redd, JID and Ski Mask the Slump God.
- On June 18, XXXTentacion was shot dead in his car in Deerfield Beach, Florida, the same day that Pittsburgh rapper Jimmy Wopo was shot dead in Pittsburgh, Pennsylvania, and Atlanta rapper Rich the Kid suffered a home invasion where he was robbed and shot at his home in Atlanta, Georgia (Rich the Kid, however, would survive).
- On June 21, XXXTentacion's mother announced at a candlelight vigil that the police had arrested Dedrick Williams, one of the men involved in XXXTentacion's death.
- On June 22, South African rapper Pro suffered a seizure and died at the age of 37.

=== July ===
- On July 3, 03 Greedo was sentenced to 20 years in prison.
- On July 16, Azealia Banks cancelled her upcoming album Fantasea II: The Second Wave after an appearance on Wild 'n Out where she accused the cast of "colorist" jokes. She would resume work on the album in August 2018.

=== August ===
- On August 24, Geto Boys' founding member DJ Ready Red died at the age of 53, from an apparent heart attack.

=== September ===
- On September 5, Ty Dolla $ign and his entourage were arrested in Atlanta, Georgia for possession of marijuana and cocaine.
- On September 6, Young Thug was charged with eight felonies related to drug and weapon possession.
- On September 7, Mac Miller died of a drug overdose.
- On September 13, Lil Xan announced his retirement from rapping due to Mac Miller's death.

=== October ===
- On October 10, Gilbert Izquierdo, A.K.A. Toker of Brownside, died in a suspected shooting in Mexico.
- On October 13, Chris Brown and Drake squashed their longtime beef at the Staples Center during Aubrey and The Three Amigos Tour.
- On October 24, South African rapper Hip Hop Pantsula died by suicide aged 38.
- On October 26, YNW Juvy and YNW Sakchaser were shot and killed at Fort Lauderdale, Florida.
- On October 29, New Orleans rapper Young Greatness was shot and killed at a Waffle House.

=== November ===
- On November 18, 6ix9ine was arrested by federal agents in relation to racketeering and firearm charges. 6ix9ine and five others faced trial in September 2019.

=== December ===
- On December 23, Atlanta-based DJ and producer Christian "Speakerfoxxx" Nilan died at 35.

== Released albums ==
=== January ===
| Day | Artist(s) | Album | Record label(s) | Entering chart position |
|---|---|---|---|---|
| 1 | Scallops Hotel | Sovereign Nose of Your Arrogant Face | Ruby Yacht, The Order Label | |
| 5 | Cupcakke | Ephorize | Cupcakke | |
| 10 | Lil Skies | Life of a Dark Rose | Lil Skies | Debuted at No. 23, peaked at No. 10 on the Billboard 200 |
| 12 | Maxo Kream | Punken | TSO Music Group, Kream Clicc | |
| 16 | Berner | The Big Pescado | Bern One | |
| 16 | Dave East | Paranoia 2 | Def Jam Recordings, Mass Appeal Records, From the Dirt | Debuted at No. 78 on the Billboard 200 |
| 16 | Kollision | Better Than Yesterday | Feed the Family, Quality Control Music | |
| 19 | JPEGMafia | Veteran | Deathbomb Arc | |
| 19 | Planet Asia | The Golden Buddha | Brick Records | |
| 19 | Paul Wall | Bounce Backs Over Setbacks | Oiler Mobb Ent | |
| 19 | Sir | November | Top Dawg Entertainment | |
| 26 | Cellski | Legendary | Inner City 2k | |
| 26 | Evidence | Weather or Not | Rhymesayers Entertainment | Debuted at No. 187 on the Billboard 200 |
| 26 | Mistah F.A.B. | Thug Tears | Faeva Afta | |
| 26 | Migos | Culture II | Quality Control, Capitol Records, Motown | Debuted at No. 1 on the Billboard 200 |
| 26 | Payroll Giovanni and Cardo | Big Bossin, Vol. 2 | Def Jam | |

=== February ===
| Day | Artist(s) | Album | Record label(s) | Entering chart position |
|---|---|---|---|---|
| 2 | Gunna | Drip Season 3 | YSL Records | Debuted at No. 55 on the Billboard 200 |
| 2 | Key Glock | Glock Bond | Paper Route Empire | Debuted at No. 101 on the Billboard 200 |
| 2 | Rich Brian | Amen | 88rising, Empire Distribution | Debuted at No. 18 on the Billboard 200 |
| 2 | Ski Mask the Slump God | You Will Regret (Reloaded) | Victor Victor Worldwide, Republic Records | Debuted at No. 195 on the Billboard 200 |
| 2 | Skooly | Don't You Ever Forget Me | TRU | |
| 2 | Skyzoo | In Celebration of Us | First Generation Rich, Empire | |
| 8 | 2 Chainz | The Play Don't Care Who Makes It | Def Jam | Debuted at No. 58 on the Billboard 200 |
| 9 | Audio Push | Cloud 909 | Good Vibe Tribe | |
| 9 | Kendrick Lamar and various artists | Black Panther: The Album | Top Dawg, Aftermath Entertainment, Interscope Records | Debuted at No. 1 on the Billboard 200 |
| 13 | Cozz | Effected | Dreamville Records, Interscope | |
| 14 | B.o.B | The Upside Down | Self-released | |
| 14 | Futuristic | Songs About Girls | We're The Future Records | |
| 14 | Kodak Black | Heart Break Kodak | Atlantic Records | Debuted at No. 48 on the Billboard 200 |
| 14 | Moneybagg Yo | 2 Heartless | N-Less Entertainment, Interscope, Collective Music Group, Bread Gang Entertainment | Debuted at No. 31 on the Billboard 200 |
| 14 | Daz Dillinger | Dazamataz | Dazamataz Inc., Felder Entertainment | |
| 16 | L.A.R.S. (Bizarre and King Gordy) | Last American Rock Stars | Majik Ninja Entertainment | |
| 16 | Nipsey Hussle | Victory Lap | All Money In Records, Atlantic | Debuted at No. 4 on the Billboard 200 |
| 16 | O.C. | A New Dawn | D.I.T.C. Studios | |
| 16 | Onyx | Black Rock | X-Ray Records | |
| 16 | Rejjie Snow | Dear Annie | 300 Entertainment, BMG Rights Management | |
| 16 | Showbiz | A Room Therapy | D.I.T.C. Records | |
| 16 | Tyga | Kyoto | Last Kings Records, Empire | |
| 16 | YFN Lucci | Freda's Son | Think It's A Game, Warner Bros. Records | Debuted at No. 167 on the Billboard 200 |
| 16 | Young Dolph | Niggas Get Shot Everyday | Paper Route Empire | Debuted at No. 59 on the Billboard 200 |
| 16 | Yukmouth | JJ Based on a Vill Story Three | Smoke-a-Lot Records, Empire | |
| 20 | Snoop Dogg | 220 | Doggystyle Records, Empire | |
| 23 | 6ix9ine | Day69 | ScumGang Records, TenThousand Projects | Debuted at No. 4 on the Billboard 200 |
| 23 | ASAP Ant | The Prelude | Marino Infantry Music | |
| 23 | Blac Youngsta | 2.23 | Epic | Debuted at No. 42 on the Billboard 200 |
| 23 | Black Milk | Fever | Computer Ugly Records, Mass Appeal | |
| 23 | Currensy | The Spring Collection | Jet Life | |
| 23 | EarthGang | Royalty | Spillage Village | |
| 23 | Hoodrich Pablo Juan & Brodinski | The Matrix | Broyal, Mony Powr Rspt, Empire | |
| 23 | Jericho Jackson (Elzhi and Khrysis) | Elzhi & Khrysis are Jericho Jackson | Jamla Records | |
| 23 | Mitchy Slick | Post Traumatic Stress Diego | Wrong Kind Records, Empire | |
| 23 | Ronny J | OMGRonny | Independently Popular, Atlantic | |
| 23 | SOB X RBE | Gangin | SOB x RBE, Empire | Debuted at No. 74 on the Billboard 200 |
| 23 | Stalley | Tell the Truth: Shame the Devil, Vol. 2 | Blue Collar Gang | |
| 23 | Towkio | WWW. | Towkio, Republic Records | |
| 23 | Young Scooter | Trippple Cross | Young Scooter, Empire | |
| 27 | Roc Marciano | RR2: The Bitter Dose | Marci Enterprises | |

=== March ===
| Day | Artist(s) | Album | Record label(s) | Entering chart position |
|---|---|---|---|---|
| 2 | Apathy | The Widow's Son | Dirty Version Records | |
| 2 | Chief Keef | The Leek 4 | Glo Gang, RBC Records | |
| 2 | Larry June | You're Doing Good | Warner Bros. | |
| 2 | Mozzy | Spiritual Conversations | Empire | |
| 2 | Nessly | Wild Flower | Republic | |
| 2 | Phonte | No News Is Good News | Foreign Exchange Music | |
| 2 | Skooly | Don't You Ever Forget Me 2 | TRU | |
| 2 | Tech N9ne | Planet | Strange Music, RBC, INgrooves Music Group | Debuted at No. 14 on the Billboard 200 |
| 2 | Tory Lanez | Memories Don't Die | Mad Love Records, Interscope | Debuted at No. 3 on the Billboard 200 |
| 2 | Valee | GOOD Job, You Found Me | GOOD Music, Def Jam | |
| 5 | Pouya | Five Five | Buffet Boys | |
| 6 | Killy | Surrender Your Soul | Secret Sound Club | |
| 9 | August Greene | August Greene | Self-released | |
| 9 | Lil Yachty | Lil Boat 2 | Quality Control, Capitol, Motown | Debuted at No. 2 on the Billboard 200 |
| 9 | Logic | Bobby Tarantino II | Def Jam, Visionary Music Group | Debuted at No. 1 on the Billboard 200 |
| 9 | Phoelix | Tempo | Self-released | |
| 9 | Robb Banks | Molly World | SS Records, Empire | |
| 9 | YFN Lucci | Ray Ray From Summerhill | Think It's A Game, Warner Bros. | Debuted at No. 14 on the Billboard 200 |
| 9 | Young Fathers | Cocoa Sugar | Ninja Tune | |
| 9 | 03 Greedo | The Wolf of Grape Street | Alamo | |
| 14 | Tre Capital | New Tier | D.LX, PHZMSC | |
| 16 | Bishop Nehru | Elevators: Act I & II | Nehruvia | |
| 16 | Chuck Strangers | Consumers Park | Nature Sounds, Pro Era | |
| 16 | Murs | A Strange Journey Into the Unimaginable | Strange Music, RBC, INgrooves | |
| 16 | PRhyme | PRhyme 2 | PRhyme Records, INgrooves | Debuted at No. 40 on the Billboard 200 |
| 16 | Rich Homie Quan | Rich As In Spirit | Motown, RAIS, Universal Music Group | Debuted at No. 42 on the Billboard 200 |
| 16 | Sean Price & Illa Ghee | Metal Detectors | Ruck Down Records, Duck Down Music | |
| 16 | Snoop Dogg | Bible of Love | RCA Inspiration | Debuted at No. 148 on the Billboard 200 |
| 16 | Saweetie | High Maintenance | Icy, Artistry Records, Warner Bros. | |
| 16 | Trae tha Truth | Hometown Hero | ABN, Empire | |
| 16 | XXXTentacion | ? | Bad Vibes Forever | Debuted at No. 1 on the Billboard 200 |
| 21 | Yung Bans | Yung Bans, Vol. 4 | Self-released | |
| 23 | Andre Nickatina | Pisces | 75 Girls Records | |
| 23 | Chief Keef | The Leek, Vol. 5 | Glo Gang, RBC | |
| 23 | DJ Luke Nasty | Cruise Control | Othaz Records, Empire | |
| 23 | Don Q | Don Talk | Self-released | |
| 23 | Trouble | Edgewood | Ear Drummer Records, Interscope | Debuted at No. 130 on the Billboard 200 |
| 23 | Waka Flocka Flame, Zaytoven and Big Bank | The Brick House Boyz | Brick Squad Monopoly Music, Entertainment One | |
| 23 | Westside Gunn and Mr. Green | Flygod Is Good... All The Time | Nature Sounds | |
| 28 | Currensy | Parking Lot Music | Jet Life | |
| 28 | Styles P | Nickel Bag | D-Block | |
| 29 | London Jae | Gunz & Roses | No Genre | |
| 30 | Czarface and MF Doom | Czarface Meets Metal Face | Get On Down, Silver Age | Debuted at No. 134 on the Billboard 200 |
| 30 | Don Trip | Christopher | Self-released | |
| 30 | GlokkNine | Kold Face Kold Kase | Self-released | |
| 30 | Meyhem Lauren | Glass | SRFSCHL | |
| 30 | Quelle Chris and Jean Grae | Everything's Fine | Mello | |
| 30 | Rich the Kid | The World Is Yours | Rich Forever, Interscope | Debuted at No. 2 on the Billboard 200 |
| 30 | Saint Jhn | Collection One | Godd Complexx, HITCO | |
| 30 | The Weeknd | My Dear Melancholy, | XO, Republic | Debuted at No. 1 on the Billboard 200 |
| 30 | U-God | Venom | Babygrande Records | |
| 30 | Various artists | Before Anythang: The Album | Cash Money Records | |
| 30 | Doja Cat | Amala | Kemosabe, RCA | Debuted at No. 162 on the Billboard 200 |

=== April ===
| Day | Artist(s) | Album | Record label(s) | Entering chart position |
|---|---|---|---|---|
| 5 | Saba | Care for Me | Saba Pivot | |
| 5 | Yung Bleu | Bleu Vandross | Self-released | |
| 6 | Cardi B | Invasion of Privacy | KSR, Atlantic | Debuted at No. 1 on the Billboard 200 |
| 6 | Dr. Octagon | Moosebumps: An Exploration Into Modern Day Horripilation | Bulk Recordings | |
| 6 | E-40 and B-Legit | Connected and Respected | Heavy On The Grind Entertainment | Debuted at No. 103 on the Billboard 200 |
| 6 | Famous Dex | Dex Meets Dexter | Rich Forever, 300 | Debuted at No. 12 on the Billboard 200 |
| 6 | Flatbush Zombies | Vacation in Hell | The Glorious Dead | Debuted at No. 11 on the Billboard 200 |
| 6 | Lil Xan | Total Xanarchy | Columbia Records | Debuted at No. 10 on the Billboard 200 |
| 6 | Oshun | Bittersweet, Vol. 1 | Self-released | |
| 6 | SD | Pay Attention | Truly Blessed, iHipHop Distribution | |
| 6 | Show Banga | Da Glo Up | HomeTeam, Empire | |
| 6 | Webbie & Joeazzy | T4L (Trill 4 Life) | Webbie Music | |
| 8 | Smoke DZA | Ringside 6 | Self-released | |
| 9 | DJ Esco | Kolorblind | Epic | Debuted at No. 38 on the Billboard 200 |
| 10 | Lil Duke | Reality Checc | YSL, Hoodrich | |
| 12 | Knxwledge | Gladwemet | Stones Throw Records | |
| 13 | Blu and Nottz | Gods in the Spirit, Titans in the Flesh | Coalmine Records | |
| 13 | Carnage | Battered Bruised & Bloody | Heavyweight Records, BMG Rights | |
| 13 | Jim Jones | Wasted Talent | Vamplife, Empire | Debuted at No. 131 on the Billboard 200 |
| 13 | Novelist | Novelist Guy | Self-released | |
| 13 | Peewee Longway | Spaghetti Factory | MPA Bandcamp Music Group, Empire | |
| 13 | Princess Nokia | A Girl Cried Red | Rough Trade | |
| 13 | Skizzy Mars | Are You OK? | Atlantic, Kingmaker, Please Rewind | |
| 13 | Smokepurpp and Murda Beatz | Bless Yo Trap | Alamo, Interscope, Cactus Jack Records | Debuted at No. 40 on the Billboard 200 |
| 13 | Young Thug | Hear No Evil | 300 | |
| 13 | Sinimatics | S3 | DSO | |
| 19 | ASAP TyY | Troubles of the World | Self-released | |
| 20 | Del the Funky Homosapien and Amp Live | Gate 13 | Gate13 | |
| 20 | Denmark Vessey | Sun Go Nova | Mello | |
| 20 | J. Cole | KOD | Dreamville, Roc Nation, Interscope | Debuted at No. 1 on the Billboard 200 |
| 20 | Nas | Illmatic: Live from the Kennedy Center | Mass Appeal | |
| 20 | Riff Raff | Alcoholic Alligator | X-Ray | |
| 20 | Slum Village | The Lost Scrolls, Vol. 2 (Slum Village Edition) | Ne'Astra Music | |
| 20 | Smoke DZA | Not for Sale | Babygrande | |
| 20 | Stevie Stone and JL | Kontra-Band | Strange Music, RBC, INgrooves | |
| 20 | 24hrs & Slicklaflare | 3200 Lenox RD | Private Club Records | |
| 20 | K-Rino | Mightier Than the Sword | Black Book Int., SoSouth | |
| 22 | Tadoe | The Golden One | DigiGlo | |
| 25 | Jordan Garrett | Do Not Disturb | Forever New Nations Productions | |
| 27 | Philthy Rich | The Remixes 2 | SMC Recordings, Empire | |
| 27 | Post Malone | Beerbongs & Bentleys | Republic | Debuted at No. 1 on the Billboard 200 |
| 27 | Tobi Lou | Tobi Lou and the Loop | Artclub, Empire | |
| 27 | Wiley | Godfather II | CTA | |
| 27 | YoungBoy Never Broke Again | Until Death Call My Name | Never Broke Again, Atlantic | Debuted at No. 7 on the Billboard 200 |
| 28 | Earl Swavey | 2 Way Swave | Safe Money Records | |

=== May ===
| Day | Artist(s) | Album | Record label(s) | Entering chart position |
|---|---|---|---|---|
| 4 | BlocBoy JB | Simi | Bloc Nation | Debuted at No. 28 on the Billboard 200 |
| 4 | Chris Orrick | Portraits | Mello | |
| 4 | Desiigner | L.O.D. | GOOD Music, Def Jam | Debuted at No. 161 on the Billboard 200 |
| 4 | Joey Cool | Joey Cool | Strange Music, RBC, INgrooves | |
| 4 | Key! and Kenny Beats | 777 | Hello!, D.O.T.S | |
| 4 | Killa Kyleon | Candy Paint N Texas Plates | Team Run It, RBC | |
| 4 | Preme | Light of Day | RCA | |
| 4 | Rae Sremmurd | SR3MM | Ear Drummers, Interscope | Debuted at No. 6 on the Billboard 200 |
| 4 | Rob Stone | Young Rob Stone | Grove Town Records | |
| 4 | Royce da 5'9" | Book of Ryan | Bad Half Records, Entertainment One | Debuted at No. 24 on the Billboard 200 |
| 4 | Scarlxrd | DXXM | A Lxrd Records, Island Records, Scarlxrd Limited, Universal Music Group | |
| 4 | Styles P | G-Host | The Phantom Entertainment | Debuted at No. 166 on the Billboard 200 |
| 4 | Yung Gravy | Snow Cougar | Republic | |
| 4 | 6 Dogs and Danny Wolf | 6 Wolves | Mad Love, Interscope, Trust Me Danny Records | |
| 8 | Bali Baby | Baylor Swift | Twin | |
| 8 | Wale | Self Promotion | Maybach Music Group, Every Blue Moon | |
| 11 | Ace Hood | Trust the Process II: Undefeated | Hood Nation, Empire | |
| 11 | Ballout | Glo Glacier | DigiGlo | |
| 11 | Chief Keef | The GloFiles, Pt. 1 | Glo Gang, RBC | |
| 11 | Chief Keef | The GloFiles, Pt. 2 | Glo Gang, RBC | |
| 11 | City Girls | Period | Quality Control | |
| 11 | Junglepussy | JP3 | Self-released | |
| 11 | Playboi Carti | Die Lit | AWGE, Interscope | Debuted at No. 3 on the Billboard 200 |
| 11 | Ski Mask the Slump God | Beware the Book of Eli | Republic, Victor Victor | Debuted at No. 50 on the Billboard 200 |
| 11 | Tee Grizzley | Activated | Tee Grizzley (Grizzley Gang), 300 | Debuted at No. 10 on the Billboard 200 |
| 11 | The Doppelgangaz | Aaaaggghh | Groggy Pack Entertainment | |
| 16 | Alontae | 2 Confident | Self-released | |
| 16 | ASAP Ant | Lil Black Jean Jacket | Self-released | |
| 16 | Kevin Gates | Chained to the City | Bread Winners' Association | |
| 16 | Kool Keith | Total Orgasm 5 | Junkadelic Music | |
| 17 | Boondox | Dirty Days of Night | Majik Ninja Entertainment | |
| 18 | Dice Soho | You Could Have | Asylum Worldwide | |
| 18 | Kyle | Light of Mine | Independently Popular, Atlantic | Debuted at No. 29 on the Billboard 200 |
| 18 | Lil Baby | Harder Than Ever | Quality Control, Motown, Capitol, Wolfpack Music Group, 4 Pockets Full | Debuted at No. 3 on the Billboard 200 |
| 18 | Nick Grant | Dreamin' Out Loud | Epic, Culture Republic | |
| 18 | MC Paul Barman | Echo Chamber | Mello | |
| 18 | Nav | Reckless | XO, Republic | Debuted at No. 8 on the Billboard 200 |
| 18 | Stalley | Tell the Truth: Shame the Devil, Vol. 3 | Blue Collar Gang | |
| 20 | Montana of 300 | Pray for the Devil | Fly Guy | |
| 22 | Blueprint | Two-Headed Monster | Weightless Recordings | |
| 22 | Gawne | Gawne Mad | GAWNE LLC | |
| 23 | Juice Wrld | Goodbye & Good Riddance | Grade A Productions, Interscope | Debuted at No. 15, peaked at No. 4 on the Billboard 200 |
| 24 | Shad da God | City of God | Bankroll Mafia, Hoodrich | |
| 24 | G-Eazy | The Vault | RCA | |
| 25 | ASAP Rocky | Testing | ASAP Worldwide, RCA, Polo Grounds Music | Debuted at No. 4 on the Billboard 200 |
| 25 | Big Scoob | Duality | Strange Music, RBC, INgrooves | |
| 25 | Casino | Disrespectful | Freebandz Productions, Casino Music | |
| 25 | Kid Trunks | Super Saiyan | The Kid Before Trunks, Empire | |
| 25 | Ouija Macc | Gutterwater | Psychopathic Records | |
| 25 | Pusha T | Daytona | GOOD Music, Def Jam | Debuted at No. 3 on the Billboard 200 |
| 25 | Zaytoven | Trap Holizay | Familiar Territory, Motown, Capitol | Debuted at No. 78 on the Billboard 200 |
| 30 | Currensy | The Marina | Jet Life | |
| 31 | Waka Flocka Flame | Big Homie Flock | Brick Squad Monopoly, eOne Music | |
| 31 | Ski Mask the Slump God | Get Dough Presents Ski Mask the Slump God | Get Dough Records | |

=== June ===
| Day | Artist(s) | Album | Record label(s) | Entering chart position |
|---|---|---|---|---|
| 1 | Black Thought | Streams of Thought, Vol. 1 | Human Re Sources | |
| 1 | Dizzy Wright | Don't Tell Me It Can't Be Done | Dizzy Wright, Empire | |
| 1 | Joe Moses | SuWop | Atlantic, All Out Bosses, Thump Records | |
| 1 | King Iso | Dementia | King Iso Music | |
| 1 | Kanye West | Ye | GOOD Music, Def Jam | Debuted at No. 1 on the Billboard 200 |
| 1 | Redneck Souljers | The River | Self-released | |
| 1 | Thouxanbanfauni | The Lost Files | Self-released | |
| 4 | T. Walker | Strictly4MyNegus Act II: United States of Affliction | Soul Society | |
| 6 | Chief Keef | Ottopsy | Digiglo, RBC | |
| 6 | Fetty Wap | Bruce Wayne | 300, RGF Productions | |
| 8 | Fat Nick | Generation Numb | Buffet Boys | |
| 8 | Future and various artists | Superfly | Epic | Debuted at No. 25 on the Billboard 200 |
| 8 | Ill Chris | Rise of Sensei | Republic, CLM | |
| 8 | Busdriver | Electricity Is on Our Side | Temporary Whatever | |
| 8 | Kids See Ghosts | Kids See Ghosts | GOOD Music, Def Jam, Republic | Debuted at No. 2 on the Billboard 200 |
| 8 | Wifisfuneral | Ethernet | Alamo | |
| 15 | Nas | Nasir | Def Jam | Debuted at No. 5 on the Billboard 200 |
| 15 | Jay Rock | Redemption | Top Dawg, Interscope | Debuted at No. 13 on the Billboard 200 |
| 15 | Axe Murder Boyz | Muerte | Canonize Productions, Majik Ninja, INgrooves | |
| 15 | Jacquees | 4275 | Cash Money | Debuted at No. 35 on the Billboard 200 |
| 15 | Rico Nasty | Nasty | Sugar Trap | |
| 16 | The Carters | Everything Is Love | Parkwood, Roc Nation, Sony | Debuted at No. 2 on the Billboard 200 |
| 18 | T.Y. | Summer Vibes | DSO | |
| 20 | A Boogie wit da Hoodie | International Artist | Highbridge, Atlantic | Debuted at No. 57 on the Billboard 200 |
| 22 | Death Grips | Year of the Snitch | Third Worlds, Harvest Records | |
| 22 | Freeway | Think Free | New Rothchilds | |
| 22 | Freddie Gibbs | Freddie | ESGN, Empire | Debuted at No. 142 on the Billboard 200 |
| 22 | Jedi Mind Tricks | The Bridge and the Abyss | Enemy Soil | |
| 22 | Red Cafe | Less Talk, More Hustle | Shakedown Entertainment | |
| 22 | Gunplay | Active | Black Bilderburg Group, Empire | |
| 22 | TK Kravitz | 2.0 | 300, Reckless Republic | |
| 22 | Westside Gunn | Supreme Blientele | Griselda Records | |
| 23 | Teyana Taylor | K.T.S.E. | GOOD Music, Def Jam | Debuted at No. 17 on the Billboard 200 |
| 24 | KRS-One | KRS-One: An Introduction to Hip-Hop | Self-released | |
| 26 | 03 Greedo | God Level | Golden Grenade Empire | |
| 26 | Yung Bans | Yung Bans Vol. 5 | Self-released | |
| 29 | Drake | Scorpion | Young Money, Cash Money, Republic, OVO | Debuted at No. 1 on the Billboard 200 |
| 29 | Danny! | The Book of Daniel | StarTower Music | |
| 29 | Tre Capital | Hero | D.LX | |

=== July ===
| Day | Artist(s) | Album | Record label(s) | Entering chart position |
|---|---|---|---|---|
| 6 | Big Narstie | BDL Bipolar | Dice Recordings | |
| 6 | Nasty C | Strings and Bling | Universal Music Group | |
| 6 | Future and Zaytoven | Beast Mode 2 | Epic, Freebandz | Debuted at No. 3 on the Billboard 200 |
| 6 | Meek Mill | Legends of the Summer | Maybach, Atlantic | Debuted at No. 9 on the Billboard 200 |
| 6 | Yukmouth & J-Hood | Savages | Smoke-a-Lot Records, ODG Ent., Empire | |
| 8 | Lil Xan | Heartbreak Soldiers | Columbia | |
| 8 | Jaden Smith | Syre: The Electric Album | MSFTS Music, Roc Nation | |
| 13 | G-Mo Skee | Chaly & the Filth Factory | Majik Ninja | |
| 13 | Kool Keith | Controller of Trap | Ocean Ave Records | |
| 13 | Armand Hammer | Paraffin | Backwoodz Studioz | |
| 13 | Marlowe (L'Orange & Solemn Brigham) | Marlowe | Mello | |
| 13 | Wiz Khalifa | Rolling Papers 2 | Atlantic, Rostrum Records | Debuted at No. 2 on the Billboard 200 |
| 20 | 88rising | Head in the Clouds | 88rising | Debuted at No. 76 on the Billboard 200 |
| 20 | Bootleg | The Transplant | Dayton Family Records | |
| 20 | Jay Park | Ask About Me | Roc Nation | |
| 20 | Buddy | Harlan & Alondra | RCA | |
| 27 | Dave East | Karma 2 | Mass Appeal | |
| 27 | Denzel Curry | Ta13oo | Loma Vista, Universal | Debuted at No. 28 on the Billboard 200 |
| 27 | G Herbo and Southside | Swervo | Machine, Epic, Cinematic, 150 Dream Team, 808 Mafia | Debuted at No. 15 on the Billboard 200 |
| 27 | Jazz Cartier | Fleurever | Universal Music Canada | |
| 27 | N.O.R.E. | 5E | Militainment Business, Mass | |

=== August ===
| Day | Artist(s) | Album | Record label(s) | Entering chart position |
|---|---|---|---|---|
| 3 | Lausse the Cat | The Girl, The Cat and The Tree | Velvet Blues | |
| 3 | Mac Miller | Swimming | Warner Bros., REMember | Debuted at No. 3 on the Billboard 200 |
| 3 | Travis Scott | Astroworld | Epic Records, Grand Hustle, Cactus Jack | Debuted at No. 1 on the Billboard 200 |
| 3 | YG | Stay Dangerous | 4Hunnid Records, CTE World, Def Jam | Debuted at No. 5 on the Billboard 200 |
| 3 | YNW Melly | I Am You | 300 Entertainment | Debuted at No. 192 on the Billboard 200 |
| 10 | D2x | Enjoy Life | Self-released | |
| 10 | Nicki Minaj | Queen | Young Money, Cash Money, Republic | Debuted at No. 2 on the Billboard 200 |
| 10 | Trippie Redd | Life's a Trip | TenThousand Projects, Caroline | Debuted at No. 4 on the Billboard 200 |
| 15 | Aminé | OnePointFive | Republic | Debuted at No. 53 on the Billboard 200 |
| 15 | Bones | LivingSucks | TeamSESH | |
| 17 | Avantdale Bowling Club | Avantdale Bowling Club | Years Gone By Records | |
| 17 | T-Pain | Everything Must Go Vol. 1 | Nappy Boy Entertainment | |
| 17 | YSL Records | Slime Language | YSL, 300 | Debuted at No. 8 on the Billboard 200 |
| 22 | Doe Boy and TM88 | 88 Birdz | Freebandz, RBMG Records | |
| 24 | Bas | Milky Way | Dreamville, Interscope | Debuted at No. 35 on the Billboard 200 |
| 24 | Binary Star | Lighty | Subterraneous Records | |
| 24 | Binary Star | Ears Apart | Subterraneous Records | |
| 24 | E-40 | The Gift of Gab | Sick Wid It Records | |
| 24 | Lex "The Hex" Master | Shadow King | Majik Ninja Entertainment | |
| 24 | Sadistik | Salo Sessions II | Self-released | |
| 24 | YoungBoy Never Broke Again | 4Respect | Never Broke Again | Debuted at No. 19 on the Billboard 200 |
| 24 | Comethazine | Bawskee | Alamo | Debuted at No. 136 on the Billboard 200 |
| 30 | YoungBoy Never Broke Again | 4Freedom | Never Broke Again | Debuted at No. 100 on the Billboard 200 |
| 30 | SahBabii | Squidtastic | Warner Bros. | |
| 31 | Blac Youngsta | Fuck Everybody 2 | Epic, CMG | Debuted at No. 63 on the Billboard 200 |
| 31 | Bun B | Return of the Trill | Rap-A-Lot | Debuted at No. 150 on the Billboard 200 |
| 31 | Currensy | Fire In The Clouds | Jet Life | |
| 31 | Eminem | Kamikaze | Shady Records, Aftermath, Interscope | Debuted at No. 1 on the Billboard 200 |
| 31 | Skooly | Don't You Ever Forget Me 3 | TRU | |

=== September ===
| Day | Artist(s) | Album | Record label(s) | Entering chart position |
|---|---|---|---|---|
| 6 | YoungBoy Never Broke Again | 4Loyalty | Never Broke Again | Debuted at No. 97 on the Billboard 200 |
| 7 | Everlast | Whitey Ford's House of Pain | Martyr Inc. | |
| 7 | Russ | Zoo | Columbia | Debuted at No. 4 on the Billboard 200 |
| 7 | Suicideboys | I Want to Die in New Orleans | G*59 Records | Debuted at No. 9 on the Billboard 200 |
| 7 | Trill Sammy | No Sleep Vol. 1 | Mad Love, Interscope | |
| 7 | YBN Almighty Jay, YBN Cordae and YBN Nahmir | YBN: The Mixtape | Young Boss Niggas | Debuted at No. 21 on the Billboard 200 |
| 7 | YoungBoy Never Broke Again | Decided | Never Broke Again | Debuted at No. 41 on the Billboard 200 |
| 10 | Octavian | Spaceman | Black Butter Limited | |
| 14 | Bubba Sparxxx | Rapper From the Country | New South Entertainment | |
| 14 | Noname | Room 25 | Self-released | |
| 14 | 6lack | East Atlanta Love Letter | LVRN, Interscope | Debuted at No. 3 on the Billboard 200 |
| 14 | YoungBoy Never Broke Again | 4 What Important | Never Broke Again | |
| 14 | Marlo | The Real 1 | Quality Control | |
| 14 | Kap G | No Kap | Atlantic | |
| 14 | Skippa da Flippa | Up to Something | Havin' Entertainment, RBC, BMG | |
| 14 | Killy | Killstreak | Secret Sound Club | |
| 14 | Innanet James | Keep It Clean | HighRes Global, Rostrum | |
| 18 | Roc Marciano | Behold a Dark Horse | Marci Enterprises | |
| 21 | Milo | Budding ornithologists are weary of tired analogies | Ruby Yacht, The Order Label | |
| 21 | Brockhampton | Iridescence | Question Everything, RCA | Debuted at No. 1 on the Billboard 200 |
| 21 | Lupe Fiasco | Drogas Wave | 1st and 15th Productions, Inc. | Debuted at No. 60 on the Billboard 200 |
| 21 | Machine Gun Kelly | Binge | Bad Boy, Interscope | Debuted at No. 24 on the Billboard 200 |
| 21 | Young Dolph | Role Model | Paper Route Empire | Debuted at No. 15 on the Billboard 200 |
| 21 | Father | Awful Swim | Awful Records, RCA, Williams Street Records | |
| 27 | Chief Keef | Cozart | 1017 Records, Interscope | |
| 28 | Cypress Hill | Elephants on Acid | BMG Rights | Debuted at No. 120 on the Billboard 200 |
| 28 | Lil Wayne | Tha Carter V | Young Money, Republic | Debuted at No. 1 on the Billboard 200 |
| 28 | Logic | Young Sinatra IV | Visionary, Def Jam | Debuted at No. 2 on the Billboard 200 |
| 28 | Blake | A Drip Like This | Atlantic | |
| 28 | Good Gas & FKi 1st | Good Gas, Vol. 2 | Mad Decent | |
| 28 | Zoey Dollaz | Who Don't Like Dollaz 2 | Epic | |
| 28 | SOB X RBE | Gangin 2 | SOB x RBE, Empire | Debuted at No. 191 on the Billboard 200 |
| 28 | Dom Kennedy | Volume Two | The Other Peoples Money Company | |
| 28 | Kevin Gates | Luca Brasi 3 | Atlantic | Debuted at No. 4 on the Billboard 200 |
| 28 | Lil Gnar | Gnar Lif3 | Ten Thousand Projects, Capitol | |

=== October ===
| Day | Artist(s) | Album | Record label(s) | Entering chart position |
|---|---|---|---|---|
| 4 | Rich Homie Quan | The Gif | Self-released | |
| 4 | Soulja Boy | Young Drako | SODMG, Palm Tree Entertainment | |
| 5 | Atmosphere | Mi Vida Local | Rhymesayers Entertainment | |
| 5 | T.I. | Dime Trap | Grand Hustle, Epic | Debuted at No. 13 on the Billboard 200 |
| 5 | Warm Brew | New Content | Red Bull Records | |
| 5 | Mozzy | Gangland Landlord | Mozzy Records, Empire | Debuted at No. 57 on the Billboard 200 |
| 5 | Sheck Wes | Mudboy | Cactus Jack, GOOD, Interscope | Debuted at No. 17 on the Billboard 200 |
| 5 | Lil Baby and Gunna | Drip Harder | Quality Control, YSL, Motown, Capitol, Wolfpack, 4 Pockets Full | Debuted at No. 4 on the Billboard 200 |
| 6 | Fat Trel | On the Run | Maybach, Slutty Boyz | |
| 6 | Lil Tracy | Designer Talk | Self-released | |
| 6 | Kodie Shane | Stay Tuned | Self-released | |
| 10 | T-Pain | Everything Must Go, Vol. 2 | Nappy Boy Entertainment | |
| 10 | Curtiss King | The Vault: West Coast | Self-released | |
| 10 | Ghostemane | N/O/I/S/E | Blackmage | |
| 11 | Soulja Boy | King | SODMG, Palm Tree | |
| 12 | Belly | Immigrant | Roc Nation, XO | Debuted at No. 169 on the Billboard 200 |
| 12 | Quavo | Quavo Huncho | Quality Control, Motown, Capitol | Debuted at No. 66, peaked at No. 2 on the Billboard 200 |
| 12 | Usher and Zaytoven | A | Brand Usher, RCA | Debuted at No. 31 on the Billboard 200 |
| 12 | Shy Glizzy | Fully Loaded | Glizzy Gang | Debuted at No. 35 on the Billboard 200 |
| 12 | BlocBoy JB & Empire Dott | Empire Bloc | Self-released | |
| 12 | City Morgue | City Morgue Vol 1: Hell or High Water | Republic | |
| 15 | DJ Muggs and Roc Marciano | Kaos | Soul Assassins Records | |
| 18 | Lil B | Options | Basedworld Records | |
| 18 | YoungBoy Never Broke Again and VL Deck | Kane & O-Dog | VL Deck, Empire | |
| 19 | Future and Juice Wrld | WRLD on Drugs | Epic, Freebandz, Grade A, Interscope | Debuted at No. 2 on the Billboard 200 |
| 19 | Khalid | Suncity | RCA, Right Hand | Debuted at No. 8 on the Billboard 200 |
| 19 | Lil Mosey | Northsbest | Interscope | Debuted at No. 29 on the Billboard 200 |
| 19 | Lil Reese | Normal Backwrds | X-Ray Records | |
| 19 | Lil Yachty | Nuthin' 2 Prove | Quality Control, Capitol, Motown | Debuted at No. 12 on the Billboard 200 |
| 23 | RM | mono. | Big Hit Entertainment | Debuted at No. 26 on the Billboard 200 |
| 26 | Black Eyed Peas | Masters of the Sun Vol. 1 | Interscope | |
| 26 | MihTy (Jeremih and Ty Dolla Sign) | MihTy | Def Jam, Atlantic | Debuted at No. 60 on the Billboard 200 |
| 26 | Apollo Brown & Joell Ortiz | Mona Lisa | Mello Music Group | |
| 26 | Joji | Ballads 1 | 88rising | Debuted at No. 3 on the Billboard 200 |
| 26 | MadeinTYO | Sincerely, Tokyo | Private Club | Debuted at No. 98 on the Billboard 200 |
| 26 | Mick Jenkins | Pieces of a Man | Cinematic | |
| 26 | Money Makin Miitch | The Epidemic | Lights Out Ent. | |
| 26 | Shad | A Short Story About War | Secret City Records | |
| 26 | Tory Lanez | Love Me Now? | Mad Love, Interscope | Debuted at No. 4 on the Billboard 200 |
| 30 | BlocBoy JB | Don't Think That | Bloc Nation | |
| 31 | Curren$y, Freddie Gibbs and The Alchemist | Fetti | Jet Life, ESGN, Empire | |

=== November ===
| Day | Artist(s) | Album | Record label(s) | Entering chart position |
|---|---|---|---|---|
| 1 | Action Bronson | White Bronco | Action Bronson Corp, Empire | |
| 2 | Jay Critch | Hood Favorite | Rich Forever, Interscope | Debuted at No. 86 on the Billboard 200 |
| 2 | K Camp | Rare Sound | Rare Sound, Interscope | |
| 2 | Kris Wu | Antares | Ace Unit, Interscope, Universal Music China, Go East Music | Debuted at No. 100 on the Billboard 200 |
| 2 | Metro Boomin | Not All Heroes Wear Capes | Boominati, Republic | Debuted at No. 1 on the Billboard 200 |
| 2 | Moneybagg Yo | Reset | N-Less, Interscope, Collective, Bread Gang | Debuted at No. 13 on the Billboard 200 |
| 2 | Styles P | Dime Bag | Phantom, D-Block | |
| 2 | Swizz Beatz | Poison | Swizz Beatz Productions, Epic | Debuted at No. 73 on the Billboard 200 |
| 2 | Takeoff | The Last Rocket | Quality Control, Motown, Capitol | Debuted at No. 4 on the Billboard 200 |
| 2 | Tha Chill | 4Wit80 | Bump Johnson Inc. | |
| 2 | Vince Staples | FM! | Def Jam | Debuted at No. 37 on the Billboard 200 |
| 7 | Wifisfuneral | Leave Me the Fuck Alone | Alamo, Interscope | |
| 8 | Smino | Noir | Zero Fatigue, Downtown Records, Interscope | Debuted at No. 191 on the Billboard 200 |
| 9 | Cupcakke | Eden | Self-released | |
| 9 | Lil Durk | Signed to the Streets 3 | Only the Family, Alamo, Interscope | Debuted at No. 17 on the Billboard 200 |
| 9 | Lil Peep | Come Over When You're Sober, Pt. 2 | Columbia | Debuted at No. 4 on the Billboard 200 |
| 9 | Masta Ace and Marco Polo | A Breukelen Story | Fat Beats | |
| 9 | Tee Grizzley | Still My Moment | Tee Grizzley, 300 | Debuted at No. 29 on the Billboard 200 |
| 9 | Too Short | The Pimp Tape | Dangerous Music, Empire | |
| 9 | Trippie Redd | A Love Letter to You 3 | TenThousand Projects, Caroline | Debuted at No. 3 on the Billboard 200 |
| 9 | Jay IDK | IDK & FRIENDS :) | Self-released, HXLY | |
| 14 | Warhol.SS | Chest Pains | Warhol.ss, Empire | |
| 15 | Leikeli47 | Acrylic | Hardcover, RCA | |
| 16 | 2 Chainz | Hot Wings Are a Girl's Best Friend | Gamebread, Def Jam | |
| 16 | 24hrs | Houses on the Hill | Private Club, Commission Music, BMG Rights | |
| 16 | 88Glam | 88Glam2 | XO, Republic | |
| 16 | Anderson .Paak | Oxnard | Aftermath, 12Tone Music | Debuted at No. 11 on the Billboard 200 |
| 16 | Big K.R.I.T. | Thrice X | Multi Alumni, BMG | |
| 16 | Birdman and Jacquees | Lost at Sea 2 | Cash Money | Debuted at No. 185 on the Billboard 200 |
| 16 | City Girls | Girl Code | Quality Control Music, Motown Records, Capitol Records | Debuted at No. 63 on the Billboard 200 |
| 16 | Fatboy SSE | Boobie from the Block | FatboyGang, Empire | |
| 16 | Lil Gotit | Hood Baby | Alamo | |
| 16 | Mike Will Made It | Creed II: The Album | Ear Drummers, Interscope | Debuted at No. 49 on the Billboard 200 |
| 16 | Yella Beezy | Ain't No Going Back | Pressplay Entertainment Group | Debuted at No. 76 on the Billboard 200 |
| 16 | Kirk Knight | IIWII | Pro Era, LLC. | |
| 16 | Z-Ro | Sadism | 1 Deep Entertainment, Empire | |
| 17 | Jaden Smith | The Sunset Tapes: A Cool Tape Story | MSFTS Music, Roc Nation | Debuted at No. 117 on the Billboard 200 |
| 22 | Boosie Badazz | Boosie Blues Cafe | Badazz Music Syndicate | |
| 22 | J.R. Writer, Hell Rell and 40 Cal. | The Upstage | JR Writer, Vydia | |
| 22 | Kollision | Not for Nothing | Quality Control, Feed the Family | |
| 22 | The Diplomats | Diplomatic Ties | Set Life, Empire | |
| 23 | Benny the Butcher | Tana Talk 3 | Griselda Records, Black Soprano Family | |
| 23 | Key Glock | Glockoma | Paper Route Empire | Debuted at No. 34 on the Billboard 200 |
| 23 | Paul Wall | Frozen Face, Vol. 1 | Oiler Mobb Ent | |
| 23 | Statik Selektah and Termanology | Still 1982 | ST. Records, Showoff Records | |
| 23 | Willie the Kid | Studio 28 | The Fly | |
| 26 | Black Thought and Salaam Remi | Streams of Thought, Vol. 2 | Passyunk Productions, Human Re Sources | |
| 26 | JID | DiCaprio 2 | Dreamville, Interscope | Debuted at No. 41 on the Billboard 200 |
| 27 | 6ix9ine | Dummy Boy | ScumGang, TenThousand Projects | Debuted at No. 2 on the Billboard 200 |
| 29 | Larry June | Very Peaceful | The Freeminded | |
| 30 | Earl Sweatshirt | Some Rap Songs | Tan Cressida, Columbia | Debuted at No. 17 on the Billboard 200 |
| 30 | Ghostface Killah | Ghost Files - Bronze Tape | X-Ray Records | |
| 30 | Ghostface Killah | Ghost Files - Propane Tape | X-Ray Records | |
| 30 | Lil Baby | Street Gossip | Quality Control, Motown, Capitol, Wolfpack, 4 Pockets Full | Debuted at No. 2 on the Billboard 200 |
| 30 | Meek Mill | Championships | Dream Chasers, Maybach, Atlantic | Debuted at No. 1 on the Billboard 200 |
| 30 | Peewee Longway | State of the Art | MPA Bandcamp, Empire | |
| 30 | Problem | S2 | Diamond Lane Music Group, Rostrum | |
| 30 | Ski Mask the Slump God | Stokeley | Victor Victor, Republic | Debuted at No. 6 on the Billboard 200 |
| 30 | Skinnyfromthe9 | It's an Evil World | Hitco | |
| 30 | The Alchemist | Bread | ALC, Empire | |
| 30 | Necro | The Notorious Goriest | Psychological Records | |

=== December ===
| Day | Artist(s) | Album | Record label(s) | Entering chart position |
|---|---|---|---|---|
| 4 | Rob Sonic | Defriender | SKYPIMPS MUSIC | |
| 7 | Domo Genesis | Facade Records EP | Genesis Music, Empire | |
| 7 | Gucci Mane | Evil Genius | GUWOP, Atlantic | Debuted at No. 5 on the Billboard 200 |
| 7 | Philthy Rich | Fake Love | SCMMLLC, Empire | |
| 7 | Ice Cube | Everythang's Corrupt | Lench Mob Records, Interscope | Debuted at No. 62 on the Billboard 200 |
| 7 | Token | Between Somewhere | eOne | |
| 7 | XXXTentacion | Skins | Bad Vibes Forever, Empire | Debuted at No. 1 on the Billboard 200 |
| 10 | Jehuniko | Paradise Island | Self-released | |
| 14 | Kodak Black | Dying to Live | Dollaz N Dealz, Sniper Gang, Atlantic | Debuted at No. 1 on the Billboard 200 |
| 14 | Method Man | Meth Lab Season 2: The Lithium | Hanz On Music Entertainment | |
| 14 | Vic Mensa | Hooligans | Roc Nation | |
| 14 | Various Artists | Spider-Man: Into the Spider-Verse (Original Soundtrack) | Republic | Debuted at No. 5, peaked at No. 2 on the Billboard 200 |
| 19 | Chris Webby | Next Wednesday | EightyHD | |
| 20 | YoungBoy Never Broke Again | Realer | Never Broke Again | Debuted at No. 15 on the Billboard 200 |
| 21 | Mike | War In My Pen | 10K | |
| 21 | 21 Savage | I Am > I Was | Epic, Slaughter Gang | Debuted at No. 1 on the Billboard 200 |
| 21 | A Boogie Wit da Hoodie | Hoodie SZN | Highbridge The Label | Debuted at No. 2, peaked at No. 1 on the Billboard 200 |
| 21 | Young Scooter | The Recipe | Black Migo Gang, Freebandz, 1017 Brick Squad | |
| 26 | Cormega | Mega | Aura, Red Line Music Distribution | |
| 28 | Bang Belushi | The Adventures of Bang Belushi | Middle Finger Music | |

== Highest-charting singles ==
=== United States ===
Hip hop singles from any year which charted in the 2018 Top 40 of the Billboard Hot 100
| Song | Artist | Project | Peak position |
|---|---|---|---|
| "God's Plan" | Drake | Scorpion | 1 |
| "Nice for What" | Drake | Scorpion | 1 |
| "In My Feelings" | Drake | Scorpion | 1 |
| "This Is America" | Childish Gambino | —N/a | 1 |
| "Psycho" | Post Malone featuring Ty Dolla Sign | Beerbongs & Bentleys | 1 |
| "Sad!" | XXXTentacion | ? | 1 |
| "I Like It" | Cardi B, Bad Bunny and J Balvin | Invasion of Privacy | 1 |
| "Sicko Mode" | Travis Scott | Astroworld | 1 |
| "Mona Lisa" | Lil Wayne featuring Kendrick Lamar | Tha Carter V | 2 |
| "Zeze" | Kodak Black featuring Travis Scott and Offset | Dying to Live | 2 |
| "Nonstop" | Drake | Scorpion | 2 |
| "Lucid Dreams" | Juice Wrld | Goodbye and Good Riddance | 2 |
| "Fefe" | 6ix9ine featuring Nicki Minaj and Murda Beatz | Dummy Boy | 3 |
| "Killshot" | Eminem | —N/a | 3 |
| "Better Now" | Post Malone | Beerbongs & Bentleys | 3 |
| "No Limit" | G-Eazy featuring ASAP Rocky and Cardi B | The Beautiful & Damned | 4 |
| "Drip Too Hard" | Lil Baby and Gunna | Drip Harder | 4 |
| "Look Alive" | BlocBoy JB featuring Drake | Simi | 5 |
| "No Brainer" | DJ Khaled featuring Justin Bieber, Quavo and Chance the Rapper | Father of Asahd | 5 |
| "Don't Cry" | Lil Wayne featuring XXXTentacion | Tha Carter V | 5 |
| "Mia" | Bad Bunny featuring Drake | X 100pre | 5 |
| "Lucky You" | Eminem featuring Joyner Lucas | Kamikaze | 6 |
| "ATM" | J. Cole | KOD | 6 |
| "Yes Indeed" | Lil Baby and Drake | Harder Than Ever | 6 |
| "I Love It" | Kanye West and Lil Pump | Harverd Dropout | 6 |
| "Mo Bamba" | Sheck Wes | Mudboy | 6 |
| "Going Bad" | Meek Mill featuring Drake | Championships | 6 |
| "Diplomatic Immunity" | Drake | Scary Hours | 7 |
| "Pray for Me" | The Weeknd and Kendrick Lamar | Black Panther: The Album | 7 |
| "All the Stars" | Kendrick Lamar and SZA | Black Panther: The Album | 7 |
| "Uproar" | Lil Wayne featuring Swizz Beatz | Tha Carter V | 7 |
| "I'm Upset" | Drake | Scorpion | 7 |
| "Stir Fry" | Migos | Culture II | 8 |
| "Yikes" | Kanye West | Ye | 8 |
| "Freaky Friday" | Lil Dicky featuring Chris Brown | —N/a | 8 |
| "Kevin's Heart" | J. Cole | KOD | 8 |
| "Stargazing" | Travis Scott | Astroworld | 8 |
| "The Ringer" | Eminem | Kamikaze | 8 |
| "Taste" | Tyga featuring Offset | Legendary | 8 |
| "Emotionless" | Drake | Scorpion | 8 |
| "Don't Matter to Me" | Drake featuring Michael Jackson | Scorpion | 9 |
| "Let It Fly" | Lil Wayne featuring Travis Scott | Tha Carter V | 10 |
| "Chun-Li" | Nicki Minaj | Queen | 10 |
| "Walk It Talk It" | Migos featuring Drake | Culture II | 10 |
| "KOD" | J. Cole | KOD | 10 |
| "River" | Eminem featuring Ed Sheeran | Revival | 11 |
| "Love" | Kendrick Lamar featuring Zacari | Damn | 11 |
| "All Mine" | Kanye West | Ye | 11 |
| "Be Careful" | Cardi B | Invasion of Privacy | 11 |
| "Paranoid" | Post Malone | Beerbongs & Bentleys | 11 |
| "Wake Up in the Sky" | Gucci Mane, Bruno Mars and Kodak Black | Evil Genius | 11 |
| "Let You Down" | NF | Perception | 12 |
| "Fall" | Eminem | Kamikaze | 12 |
| "Apeshit" | The Carters | Everything Is Love | 13 |
| "Ric Flair Drip" | Offset and Metro Boomin | Without Warning | 13 |
| "Plug Walk" | Rich the Kid | The World Is Yours | 13 |
| "Moonlight" | XXXTentacion | ? | 13 |
| "Mob Ties" | Drake | Scorpion | 13 |
| "Money" | Cardi B | —N/a | 13 |
| "Rap Devil" | Machine Gun Kelly | Binge | 13 |
| "Falling Down" | Lil Peep and XXXTentacion | Come Over When You're Sober, Pt. 2 | 13 |
| "Bartier Cardi" | Cardi B featuring 21 Savage | Invasion of Privacy | 14 |
| "Dedicate" | Lil Wayne | Tha Carter V | 14 |
| "Him & I" | G-Eazy and Halsey | The Beautiful & Damned | 14 |
| "Photograph" | J. Cole | KOD | 14 |
| "Rich and Sad" | Post Malone | Beerbongs & Bentleys | 14 |
| "Elevate" | Drake | Scorpion | 14 |
| "Motiv8" | J. Cole | KOD | 15 |
| "Spoil My Night" | Post Malone featuring Swae Lee | Beerbongs & Bentleys | 15 |
| "Never Recover" | Lil Baby, Gunna and Drake | Drip Harder | 15 |
| "I Fall Apart" | Post Malone | Stoney | 16 |
| "Ghost Town" | Kanye West featuring PartyNextDoor | Ye | 16 |
| "Bad!" | XXXTentacion | Skins | 16 |
| "Ball for Me" | Post Malone featuring Nicki Minaj | Beerbongs & Bentleys | 16 |
| "Watch" | Travis Scott featuring Lil Uzi Vert and Kanye West | —N/a | 16 |
| "Big Bank" | YG featuring Big Sean, 2 Chainz and Nicki Minaj | Stay Dangerous | 16 |
| "Kamikaze" | Eminem | Kamikaze | 16 |
| "Stay" | Post Malone | Beerbongs & Bentleys | 17 |
| "Survival" | Drake | Scorpion | 17 |
| "Can't Be Broken" | Lil Wayne | Tha Carter V | 17 |
| "Changes" | XXXTentacion | ? | 18 |
| "Can't Take a Joke" | Drake | Scorpion | 18 |
| "Barbie Dreams" | Nicki Minaj | Queen | 18 |
| "Jocelyn Flores" | XXXTentacion | 17 | 19 |
| "1985" | J. Cole | KOD | 20 |
| "Talk Up" | Drake featuring Jay-Z | Scorpion | 20 |
| "Same Bitches" | Post Malone featuring G-Eazy and YG | Beerbongs & Bentleys | 20 |
| "What's Free" | Meek Mill featuring Rick Ross and Jay-Z | Championships | 20 |
| "King's Dead" | Jay Rock, Kendrick Lamar, Future and James Blake | Black Panther: The Album | 21 |
| "Drip" | Cardi B featuring Migos | Invasion of Privacy | 21 |
| "8 Out of 10" | Drake | Scorpion | 21 |
| "44 More" | Logic | Bobby Tarantino II | 22 |
| "Top Off" | DJ Khaled featuring Jay-Z, Future and Beyoncé | Father of Asahd | 22 |
| "I Do" | Cardi B featuring SZA | Invasion of Privacy | 23 |
| "Zack and Codeine" | Post Malone | Beerbongs & Bentleys | 23 |
| "Greatest" | Eminem | Kamikaze | 23 |
| "New Patek" | Lil Uzi Vert | —N/a | 24 |
| "Wouldn't Leave" | Kanye West featuring PartyNextDoor | Ye | 24 |
| "Over Now" | Post Malone | Beerbongs & Bentleys | 24 |
| "What About Me" | Lil Wayne featuring Sosamann | Tha Carter V | 24 |
| "Esskeetit" | Lil Pump | Harverd Dropout | 24 |
| "Carousel" | Travis Scott | Astroworld | 24 |
| "Not Alike" | Eminem featuring Royce da 5'9" | Kamikaze | 24 |
| "Barbie Tingz" | Nicki Minaj | Queen | 25 |
| "Yosemite" | Travis Scott | Astroworld | 25 |
| "Stoopid" | 6ix9ine featuring Bobby Shmurda | Dummy Boy | 25 |
| "Plain Jane" | ASAP Ferg | Still Striving | 26 |
| "R.I.P. Screw" | Travis Scott | Astroworld | 26 |
| "Dark Side of the Moon" | Lil Wayne featuring Nicki Minaj | Tha Carter V | 26 |
| "Fine China" | Future and Juice Wrld | Wrld on Drugs | 26 |
| "Violent Crimes" | Kanye West | Ye | 27 |
| "Sandra's Rose" | Drake | Scorpion | 27 |
| "Stop Trying to Be God" | Travis Scott | Astroworld | 27 |
| "Powerglide" | Rae Sremmurd featuring Juicy J | SR3MM | 28 |
| "Ring" | Cardi B featuring Kehlani | Invasion of Privacy | 28 |
| "The Cut Off" | J. Cole featuring Kill Edward | KOD | 28 |
| "I Thought About Killing You" | Kanye West | Ye | 28 |
| "Summer Games" | Drake | Scorpion | 28 |
| "Fuck Love" | XXXTentacion featuring Trippie Redd | 17 | 28 |
| "Japan" | Famous Dex | Dex Meets Dexter | 28 |
| "Close Friends" | Lil Baby | Drip Harder | 28 |
| "Arms Around You" | XXXTentacion and Lil Pump featuring Maluma and Swae Lee | —N/a | 28 |
| "Takin' Shots" | Post Malone | Beerbongs & Bentleys | 29 |
| "Everyday" | Logic and Marshmello | Bobby Tarantino II | 29 |
| "Brackets" | J. Cole | KOD | 30 |
| "Blue Tint" | Drake | Scorpion | 30 |
| "Wake Up" | Travis Scott | Astroworld | 30 |
| "Bebe" | 6ix9ine featuring Anuel AA | Dummy Boy | 30 |
| "On Me" | Meek Mill featuring Cardi B | Championships | 30 |
| "Roll in Peace" | Kodak Black featuring XXXTentacion | Project Baby 2 | 31 |
| "Outside Today" | YoungBoy Never Broke Again | Until Death Call My Name | 31 |
| "No Bystanders" | Travis Scott | Astroworld | 31 |
| "Dangerous" | Meek Mill featuring Jeremih and PnB Rock | Championships | 31 |
| "Jaded" | Drake | Scorpion | 32 |
| "Self Care" | Mac Miller | Swimming | 33 |
| "Candy Paint" | Post Malone | Beerbongs & Bentleys | 34 |
| "Narcos" | Migos | Culture II | 36 |
| "Lemon" | N.E.R.D and Rihanna | No One Ever Really Dies | 36 |
| "No Mistakes" | Kanye West | Ye | 36 |
| "Is There More" | Drake | Scorpion | 36 |
| "5% Tint" | Travis Scott | Astroworld | 36 |
| "Famous" | Lil Wayne featuring Reginae Carter | Tha Carter V | 36 |
| "That's How You Feel" | Drake | Scorpion | 37 |
| "Whoa (Mind in Awe)" | XXXTentacion | Skins | 37 |
| "Get Up 10" | Cardi B | Invasion of Privacy | 38 |
| "Peak" | Drake | Scorpion | 38 |
| "Can't Say" | Travis Scott | Astroworld | 38 |
| "Don't Come Out the House" | Metro Boomin featuring 21 Savage | Not All Heroes Wear Capes | 38 |
| "Best Life" | Cardi B featuring Chance the Rapper | Invasion of Privacy | 39 |
| "Reborn" | Kids See Ghosts | Kids See Ghosts | 39 |
| "Normal" | Eminem | Kamikaze | 39 |
| "Dope Niggaz" | Lil Wayne featuring Snoop Dogg | Tha Carter V | 39 |
| "Uptown Vibes" | Meek Mill featuring Fabolous and Anuel AA | Championships | 39 |
| "92 Explorer" | Post Malone | Beerbongs & Bentleys | 40 |

=== United Kingdom ===
Hip hop songs from any year which charted in the 2018 Top 10 of the UK Singles Chart
| Song | Artist | Project | Peak position |
|---|---|---|---|
| "Funky Friday" | Dave and Fredo | —N/a | 1 |
| "Barking" | Ramz | Blockbuster | 2 |
| "Man's Not Hot" | Big Shaq | —N/a | 3 |

== Highest first-week consumption ==
List of albums with the highest first-week consumption (sales + streaming + track equivalent), as of December 2018 in the United States
| Number | Album | Artist | 1st-week consumption | 1st-week position | Refs |
|---|---|---|---|---|---|
| 1 | Scorpion | Drake | 732,000 | 1 | |
| 2 | Astroworld | Travis Scott | 537,000 | 1 | |
| 3 | Tha Carter V | Lil Wayne | 480,000 | 1 | |
| 4 | Beerbongs & Bentleys | Post Malone | 461,000 | 1 | |
| 5 | Kamikaze | Eminem | 434,000 | 1 | |
| 6 | KOD | J. Cole | 397,000 | 1 | |
| 7 | Invasion of Privacy | Cardi B | 255,000 | 1 | |
| 8 | Championships | Meek Mill | 229,000 | 1 | |
| 9 | Ye | Kanye West | 208,000 | 1 | |
| 10 | Culture II | Migos | 199,000 | 1 | |

== All critically reviewed albums ranked ==
=== Metacritic ===
| Number | Artist | Album | Average score | Number of reviews | Reference |
|---|---|---|---|---|---|
| 1 | Noname | Room 25 | 93 | 17 reviews | |
| 2 | Saba | Care for Me | 93 | 5 reviews | |
| 3 | Young Fathers | Cocoa Sugar | 87 | 21 reviews | |
| 4 | 03 Greedo | God Level | 87 | 4 reviews | |
| 5 | Pusha T | Daytona | 86 | 22 reviews | |
| 6 | Earl Sweatshirt | Some Rap Songs | 86 | 19 reviews | |
| 7 | Denzel Curry | Ta13oo | 86 | 6 reviews | |
| 8 | Curren$y, Freddie Gibbs & The Alchemist | Fetti | 86 | 4 reviews | |
| 9 | Travis Scott | Astroworld | 85 | 19 reviews | |
| 10 | Brockhampton | Iridescence | 85 | 11 reviews | |
| 11 | Cardi B | Invasion of Privacy | 84 | 24 reviews | |
| 12 | Kids See Ghosts | Kids See Ghosts | 84 | 18 reviews | |
| 13 | Quelle Chris & Jean Grae | Everything's Fine | 84 | 9 reviews | |
| 14 | CupcakKe | Ephorize | 84 | 7 reviews | |
| 15 | Royce Da 5'9" | Book Of Ryan | 84 | 5 reviews | |
| 16 | Freddie Gibbs | Freddie | 84 | 5 reviews | |
| 17 | Junglepussy | JP3 | 83 | 6 reviews | |
| 18 | Buddy | Harlan & Alondra | 83 | 5 reviews | |
| 19 | Dave East | Paranoia 2 | 83 | 4 reviews | |
| 20 | Takeoff | The Last Rocket | 82 | 6 reviews | |
| 21 | Vince Staples | FM! | 81 | 16 reviews | |
| 22 | Jay Rock | Redemption | 81 | 10 reviews | |
| 23 | 21 Savage | I Am > I Was | 81 | 6 reviews | |
| 24 | T.I. | Dime Trap | 81 | 5 reviews | |
| 25 | The Carters | Everything Is Love | 80 | 22 reviews | |
| 26 | Black Milk | Fever | 80 | 7 reviews | |
| 27 | JID | DiCaprio 2 | 80 | 6 reviews | |
| 28 | Nipsey Hussle | Victory Lap | 80 | 6 reviews | |
| 29 | Novelist | Novelist Guy | 79 | 8 reviews | |
| 30 | Lil Peep | Come Over When You're Sober, Pt. 2 | 79 | 7 reviews | |
| 31 | Ice Cube | Everythang's Corrupt | 79 | 5 reviews | |
| 32 | Rejjie Snow | Dear Annie | 79 | 5 reviews | |
| 33 | Flatbush Zombies | Vacation In Hell | 79 | 4 reviews | |
| 34 | Mac Miller | Swimming | 78 | 13 reviews | |
| 35 | Gucci Mane | Evil Genius | 78 | 6 reviews | |
| 36 | Metro Boomin | Not All Heroes Wear Capes | 78 | 4 reviews | |
| 37 | Meek Mill | Championships | 77 | 10 reviews | |
| 38 | Dr. Octagon | Moosebumps: An Exploration Into Modern Day Horripilation | 77 | 10 reviews | |
| 39 | Mick Jenkins | Pieces of a Man | 77 | 6 reviews | |
| 40 | CupcakKe | Eden | 77 | 5 reviews | |
| 41 | Future | Beast Mode 2 | 77 | 4 reviews | |
| 42 | Rae Sremmurd | SR3MM | 76 | 10 reviews | |
| 43 | Sheck Wes | Mudboy | 76 | 5 reviews | |
| 44 | Lil Baby & Gunna | Drip Harder | 76 | 4 reviews | |
| 45 | Cozz | Effected | 76 | 4 reviews | |
| 46 | Cypress Hill | Elephants on Acid | 75 | 11 reviews | |
| 47 | Czarface & MF Doom | Czarface Meets Metal Face | 75 | 9 reviews | |
| 48 | PRhyme | PRhyme 2 | 74 | 6 reviews | |
| 49 | Anderson .Paak | Oxnard | 73 | 18 reviews | |
| 50 | J. Cole | KOD | 73 | 14 reviews | |
| 51 | Lupe Fiasco | Drogas Wave | 73 | 5 reviews | |
| 52 | Lil Wayne | Tha Carter V | 72 | 14 reviews | |
| 53 | August Greene | August Greene | 72 | 5 reviews | |
| 54 | YG | Stay Dangerous | 71 | 16 reviews | |
| 55 | Playboi Carti | Die Lit | 71 | 7 reviews | |
| 56 | Logic | YSIV | 71 | 7 reviews | |
| 57 | Nicki Minaj | Queen | 70 | 22 reviews | |
| 58 | Migos | Culture II | 69 | 19 reviews | |
| 59 | Death Grips | Year of the Snitch | 69 | 8 reviews | |
| 60 | Westside Gunn | Supreme Blientele | 69 | 5 reviews | |
| 61 | Rich Brian | Amen | 68 | 6 reviews | |
| 62 | Drake | Scorpion | 67 | 26 reviews | |
| 63 | A$AP Rocky | Testing | 67 | 8 reviews | |
| 64 | Kanye West | Ye | 64 | 34 reviews | |
| 65 | Eminem | Kamikaze | 62 | 16 reviews | |
| 66 | Wiley | Godfather II | 61 | 5 reviews | |
| 67 | Princess Nokia | A Girl Cried Red | 61 | 5 reviews | |
| 68 | Quavo | Quavo Huncho | 60 | 6 reviews | |
| 69 | Nas | Nasir | 58 | 16 reviews | |
| 70 | Wiz Khalifa | Rolling Papers 2 | 56 | 6 reviews | |
| 71 | Bhad Bhabie | 15 | 56 | 5 reviews | |
| 72 | Big Narstie | BDL Bipolar | 55 | 5 reviews | |
| 73 | Snoop Dogg | Bible of Love | 54 | 4 reviews | |
| 74 | Lil Yachty | Nuthin' 2 Prove | 52 | 8 reviews | |
| 75 | Post Malone | Beerbongs & Bentleys | 51 | 10 reviews | |
| 76 | Lil Yachty | Lil Boat 2 | 50 | 8 reviews | |
| 77 | Lil Xan | Total Xanarchy | 49 | 7 reviews | |
| 78 | Tory Lanez | Memories Don't Die | 46 | 5 reviews | |
| 79 | XXXTentacion | Skins | 44 | 9 reviews | |
| 80 | 6ix9ine | Dummy Boy | 38 | 11 reviews | |

=== AnyDecentMusic? ===
| Number | Artist | Album | Average score | Number of reviews | Reference |
|---|---|---|---|---|---|
| 1 | Pusha T | Daytona | 8.2 | 19 reviews | |
| 2 | Saba | Care for Me | 8.2 | 6 reviews | |
| 3 | Travis Scott | Astroworld | 8.1 | 12 reviews | |
| 4 | Cardi B | Invasion of Privacy | 8.1 | 17 reviews | |
| 5 | Brockhampton | Iridescence | 8.0 | 10 reviews | |

== See also ==
- Previous article: 2017 in hip-hop
- Next article: 2019 in hip-hop
