= Aubrey & the Three Migos Tour =

2018 concert tour by Drake and Migos

- Continental tour by Drake and Migos
- Location: North America
- Associated album: Scorpion; Culture II
- Start date: August 12, 2018
- End date: November 18, 2018
- Legs: 1
- No. of shows: 54
- Supporting act: Roy Woods
- Attendance: 877,241
- Box office: $103.1 million
Drake tour chronology
Boy Meets World Tour (2017)	Aubrey & the Three Migos Tour (2018)	Assassination Vacation Tour (2019)

Aubrey & the Three Migos Tour, presented as Aubrey & The Three Migos Tour LIVE!, was a co-headlining tour by Canadian rapper Drake, and American hip hop trio Migos. The tour began on August 12, 2018, in Kansas City, and concluded on November 18, 2018, in Atlanta.

== Background ==
Drake and the Migos first collaborated in 2013 when Drake released a remix of the Migos song "Versace". The remix soon went viral and helped propel the Migos into mainstream success, with them later earning their first #1 single on the Billboard Hot 100 with Bad and Boujee in early 2017. Drake and Migos released their second collaboration, "Walk It Talk It", on January 26, 2018, when the Migos released their third studio album, Culture II. "Walk It Talk It" quickly became a hit and peaked at number 10 on the Billboard Hot 100.

On May 14, 2018, both acts announced they would tour together on the "Aubrey & the Three Migos Tour" in the summer and fall of 2018. The concert tour was supported by the Migos third studio album, Culture II, and Drake's fifth studio album, Scorpion, which was released a month after the tour's announcement.

== Set list ==
This set list is representative of the show on August 12, 2018, in Kansas City.

1. "8 Out of 10"
2. "Talk Up"
3. "Mob Ties"
4. "Started From the Bottom"
5. "Jumpman"
6. "Both"
7. "Know Yourself"
8. "Emotionless"
9. "Elevate"
10. "Can't Take a Joke"
11. "Energy"
12. "Yes Indeed"
13. "Trophies"
14. "Free Smoke"
15. "Gyalchester"
16. "Pop Style"
17. "Over"
18. "Headlines"
19. "HYFR"
20. "All Me"
21. "Blessings"
22. "For Free"
23. "The Motto"
24. "My Way (Remix)"
25. "Walk It Talk It"
26. "Versace"
27. "Hot Summer"
28. "Workin' Me"
29. "Drip"
30. "Stir Fry"
31. "Blue Tint"
32. "That's How You Feel"
33. "Don't Matter to Me"
34. "Rock with You" (Michael Jackson cover)
35. "After Dark"
36. "Jaded"
37. "Controlla"
38. "Work"
39. "One Dance"
40. "Hotline Bling"
41. "Fake Love"
42. "Nice For What"
43. "In My Feelings"
44. "Look Alive"
45. "Sicko Mode"
46. "Nonstop
47. "I'm Upset"
48. "Over My Dead Body" (interlude)
49. "God's Plan"

Drake has brought out surprise guests at some of his tour dates, which includes:

- Blocboy JB at the 2nd show in Chicago, Illinois, the 4th show in Inglewood, California, & the 3rd show in Atlanta, Georgia
- Tory Lanez at the 1st show in New York City
- French Montana at the 2nd show in Brooklyn, New York & the 1st show in Atlanta, Georgia
- Meek Mill at the 2nd show in Boston, Massachusetts and the 1st show in Philadelphia, Pennsylvania
- Big Freedia & Yung Miami of the duo group City Girls at the show in New Orleans, Louisiana
- Travis Scott at the 1st & 2nd show in Toronto, Ontario, the 4th show in New York City, the 2nd show in Houston, Texas, the 2nd show in Los Angeles, California, and the 3rd show in Inglewood, California
- Sheck Wes at the 1st show in Toronto, Ontario
- Chris Brown at the 1st show in Los Angeles, California
- LeBron James at the 2nd show in Los Angeles, California
- YG at the 4th show in Inglewood, California
- Post Malone at the 4th show in Inglewood, California
- E-40 at the 3rd show in Oakland, California
- Too $hort at the 3rd show in Oakland, California
- Bad Bunny at the 1st show in Miami, Florida
- DJ Khaled at the 1st show in Miami, Florida
- Lil Wayne at the 1st & 2nd shows in Miami, Florida
- Lil Baby at the 3rd show in Los Angeles, California & 1st & 3rd shows in Atlanta, Georgia
- Gucci Mane at the 2nd show in Atlanta, Georgia
- Trey Songz at the 3rd show in Atlanta, Georgia
- Jeezy at the 3rd show in Atlanta, Georgia
- Future at the 3rd show in Atlanta, Georgia

Migos has also brought out surprise guest as well which includes:

- Tee Grizzley at the 2nd show in Detroit, Michigan
- Cardi B at the 2nd show in New York City & the 3rd show in Los Angeles, California
- Rich the Kid at the 3rd show in New York City
- Tyga at the 2nd show in Las Vegas, Nevada and the 1st show in Los Angeles, California
- Playboi Carti at the 3rd show in Los Angeles, California
- Saweetie at the 1st & 2nd shows in Oakland, California
- Mozzy at the 3rd show in Oakland, California
- Gucci Mane at the 1st show in Miami, Florida
- Lil Yachty at the 2nd show in Atlanta, Georgia
- 21 Savage at the 3rd show in Atlanta, Georgia

== Tour dates ==
List of concerts, showing date, city, country, venue, opening act, tickets sold, number of available tickets and amount of gross revenue
Date	City	Country	Venue	Opening Act	Attendance	Revenue
Leg 1 — North America
August 12, 2018	Kansas City	United States	Sprint Center	—N/a	17,294 / 17,294	$1,703,354
August 14, 2018	Detroit	United States	Little Caesars Arena	Roy Woods	37,642 / 37,642	$3,371,154
August 15, 2018	Detroit	United States	Little Caesars Arena	Roy Woods	37,642 / 37,642	$3,371,154
August 17, 2018	Chicago	United States	United Center	Roy Woods	35,795 / 35,795	$4,133,052
August 18, 2018	Chicago	United States	United Center	Roy Woods	35,795 / 35,795	$4,133,052
August 21, 2018	Toronto	Canada	Scotiabank Arena	Roy Woods	35,356 / 35,356	$3,548,050
August 22, 2018	Toronto	Canada	Scotiabank Arena	Roy Woods	35,356 / 35,356	$3,548,050
August 24, 2018	New York City	United States	Madison Square Garden	Roy Woods	67,446 / 67,446	$8,992,078
August 25, 2018	New York City	United States	Madison Square Garden	Roy Woods	67,446 / 67,446	$8,992,078
August 27, 2018	New York City	United States	Madison Square Garden	Roy Woods	67,446 / 67,446	$8,992,078
August 28, 2018	New York City	United States	Madison Square Garden	Roy Woods	67,446 / 67,446	$8,992,078
August 30, 2018	Brooklyn	United States	Barclays Center	Roy Woods	44,007 / 44,007	$5,743,420
August 31, 2018	Brooklyn	United States	Barclays Center	Roy Woods	44,007 / 44,007	$5,743,420
September 1, 2018	Brooklyn	United States	Barclays Center	Roy Woods	44,007 / 44,007	$5,743,420
September 4, 2018	Montreal	Canada	Bell Centre	Roy Woods	30,444 / 33,016	$2,949,548
September 5, 2018	Montreal	Canada	Bell Centre	Roy Woods	30,444 / 33,016	$2,949,548
September 7. 2018	Boston	United States	TD Garden	Roy Woods	44,777 / 44,777	$5,231,440
September 8, 2018	Boston	United States	TD Garden	Roy Woods	44,777 / 44,777	$5,231,440
September 9, 2018	Boston	United States	TD Garden	Roy Woods	44,777 / 44,777	$5,231,440
September 12, 2018	Washington, D.C.	United States	Capital One Arena	Roy Woods	31,665 / 31,665	$3,886,426
September 13, 2018	Washington, D.C.	United States	Capital One Arena	Roy Woods	31,665 / 31,665	$3,886,426
September 15, 2018	Philadelphia	United States	Wells Fargo Center	Roy Woods	30,981 / 32,430	$2,980,081
September 16, 2018	Philadelphia	United States	Wells Fargo Center	Roy Woods	30,981 / 32,430	$2,980,081
September 18, 2018	Nashville	United States	Bridgestone Arena	Roy Woods	15,524 / 15,524	$1,540,401
September 24, 2018	New Orleans	United States	Smoothie King Center	Roy Woods	15,086 / 15,086	$1,558,828
September 26, 2018	Dallas	United States	American Airlines Center	Roy Woods	30,640 / 32,324	$3,735,312
September 27, 2018	Dallas	United States	American Airlines Center	Roy Woods	30,640 / 32,324	$3,735,312
September 29, 2018	Houston	United States	Toyota Center	Roy Woods	45,540 / 47,772	$5,043,922
September 30, 2018	Houston	United States	Toyota Center	Roy Woods	45,540 / 47,772	$5,043,922
October 2, 2018	Houston	United States	Toyota Center	Roy Woods	45,540 / 47,772	$5,043,922
October 5, 2018	Las Vegas	United States	MGM Grand Garden Arena	Roy Woods	27,804 / 29,278	$3,390,124
October 6, 2018	Las Vegas	United States	MGM Grand Garden Arena	Roy Woods	27,804 / 29,278	$3,390,124
October 8, 2018	Glendale	United States	Gila River Arena	Roy Woods	16,591 / 16,591	$1,772,431
October 12, 2018	Los Angeles	United States	Staples Center	Roy Woods	47,428 / 49,167	$7,172,937
October 13, 2018	Los Angeles	United States	Staples Center	Roy Woods	47,428 / 49,167	$7,172,937
October 14, 2018	Los Angeles	United States	Staples Center	Roy Woods	47,428 / 49,167	$7,172,937
October 16, 2018	Inglewood	United States	The Forum	Roy Woods	65,832 / 66,056	$8,179,408
October 17, 2018	Inglewood	United States	The Forum	Roy Woods	65,832 / 66,056	$8,179,408
October 19, 2018	Inglewood	United States	The Forum	Roy Woods	65,832 / 66,056	$8,179,408
October 20, 2018	Inglewood	United States	The Forum	Roy Woods	65,832 / 66,056	$8,179,408
October 26, 2018	Oakland	United States	Oracle Arena	Roy Woods	53,405 / 53,405	$6,092,681
October 27, 2018	Oakland	United States	Oracle Arena	Roy Woods	53,405 / 53,405	$6,092,681
October 29, 2018	Oakland	United States	Oracle Arena	Roy Woods	53,405 / 53,405	$6,092,681
November 1, 2018	Tacoma	United States	Tacoma Dome	Roy Woods	20,792 / 20,792	$2,779,938
November 3, 2018	Vancouver	Canada	Rogers Arena	Roy Woods	33,320 / 33,320	$3,652,566
November 4, 2018	Vancouver	Canada	Rogers Arena	Roy Woods	33,320 / 33,320	$3,652,566
November 6, 2018	Edmonton	Canada	Rogers Place	Roy Woods	32,236 / 32,236	$2,848,314
November 7, 2018	Edmonton	Canada	Rogers Place	Roy Woods	32,236 / 32,236	$2,848,314
November 10, 2018	St. Louis	United States	Enterprise Center	Roy Woods	17,418 / 17,418	$1,900,401
November 13, 2018	Miami	United States	American Airlines Arena	Roy Woods	36,208 / 36,208	$4,959,095
November 14, 2018	Miami	United States	American Airlines Arena	Roy Woods	36,208 / 36,208	$4,959,095
November 16, 2018	Atlanta	United States	State Farm Arena	Roy Woods	44,010 / 44,010	$5,895,151
November 17, 2018	Atlanta	United States	State Farm Arena	Roy Woods	44,010 / 44,010	$5,895,151
November 18, 2018	Atlanta	United States	State Farm Arena		44,010 / 44,010	$5,895,151
Total					877,241 / 888,739 (98.71%)	$103,060,112
