= Assassination Vacation Tour =

2019 concert tour by Drake

- Tour by Drake
- Location: Europe
- Start date: March 10, 2019
- End date: April 26, 2019
- Legs: 1
- No. of shows: 23
- Supporting acts: Tory Lanez, Tiffany Calver
- Attendance: 285,778
- Box office: US$33,851,546

Drake concert chronology
- Aubrey & the Three Migos Tour (2018); Assassination Vacation Tour (2019); It's All a Blur Tour (2023-24)

The Assassination Vacation Tour was the sixth concert tour by Canadian rapper Drake, in support of his fifth studio album Scorpion (2018). The tour commenced on March 10, 2019 in Manchester and concluded on April 26, in Amsterdam.

It was Drake's first European tour in two years and consisted of 23 shows across six cities, including seven consecutive shows in London. Tory Lanez and Tiffany Calver supported as the tour's opening acts. The tour was a box office success, selling over 285,000 tickets and grossing US$33.8 million.

== Tour dates ==
List of concerts, showing date, city, country, venue, opening acts, tickets sold, number of available tickets and amount of gross revenue
Date	City	Country	Venue	Support Act	Attendance	Gross
Europe
March 10, 2019	Manchester	England	Manchester Arena	Tory Lanez Tiffany Calver	29,441 / 30,524	$3,800,000
March 11, 2019	Manchester	England	Manchester Arena	Tory Lanez Tiffany Calver	29,441 / 30,524	$3,800,000
March 13, 2019	Paris	France	AccorHotels Arena	Tory Lanez Tiffany Calver	30,475 / 36,908	$3,500,000
March 15, 2019	Paris	France	AccorHotels Arena	Tory Lanez Tiffany Calver	30,475 / 36,908	$3,500,000
March 16, 2019	Paris	France	AccorHotels Arena	Tory Lanez Tiffany Calver	30,475 / 36,908	$3,500,000
March 19, 2019	Dublin	Ireland	3Arena	Tory Lanez Tiffany Calver	31,054 / 31,961	$4,011,580
March 21, 2019	Dublin	Ireland	3Arena	Tory Lanez Tiffany Calver	31,054 / 31,961	$4,011,580
March 22, 2019	Dublin	Ireland	3Arena	Tory Lanez Tiffany Calver	31,054 / 31,961	$4,011,580
March 26, 2019	Birmingham	England	Resorts World Arena	Tory Lanez Tiffany Calver	24,173 / 31,764	$3,517,231
March 27, 2019	Birmingham	England	Resorts World Arena	Tory Lanez Tiffany Calver	24,173 / 31,764	$3,517,231
March 28, 2019	Birmingham	England	Resorts World Arena	Tory Lanez Tiffany Calver	24,173 / 31,764	$3,517,231
April 1, 2019	London	England	The O2 Arena	Tory Lanez Tiffany Calver	98,148 / 121,847	$13,451,300
April 2, 2019	London	England	The O2 Arena	Tory Lanez Tiffany Calver	98,148 / 121,847	$13,451,300
April 4, 2019	London	England	The O2 Arena	Tory Lanez Tiffany Calver	98,148 / 121,847	$13,451,300
April 5, 2019	London	England	The O2 Arena	Tory Lanez Tiffany Calver	98,148 / 121,847	$13,451,300
April 8, 2019	London	England	The O2 Arena	Tory Lanez Tiffany Calver	98,148 / 121,847	$13,451,300
April 9, 2019	London	England	The O2 Arena	Tory Lanez Tiffany Calver	98,148 / 121,847	$13,451,300
April 11, 2019	London	England	The O2 Arena	Tory Lanez Tiffany Calver	98,148 / 121,847	$13,451,300
April 19, 2019	Antwerp	Belgium	Sportpaleis	Tory Lanez Tiffany Calver	29,092 / 31,305	$2,203,568
April 20, 2019	Antwerp	Belgium	Sportpaleis	Tory Lanez Tiffany Calver	29,092 / 31,305	$2,203,568
April 23, 2019	Amsterdam	Netherlands	Ziggo Dome	Tory Lanez Tiffany Calver	43,395 / 48,807	$3,329,130
April 25, 2019	Amsterdam	Netherlands	Ziggo Dome	Tory Lanez Tiffany Calver	43,395 / 48,807	$3,329,130
April 26, 2019	Amsterdam	Netherlands	Ziggo Dome	Tory Lanez Tiffany Calver	43,395 / 48,807	$3,329,130
Total					285,778	$33,851,546
