= 8 Out of 10 =

Song by Drake

from the album Scorpion
- Released: June 29, 2018
- Recorded: 2018
- Genre: Hip hop
- Length: 3:15
- Label: OVO Sound; Cash Money; Young Money
- Songwriters: Aubrey Graham; Matthew Samuels; Jahaan Sweet; Matthew O'Brien; Abrim Tilmon; Leon Ware; Arthur Ross
- Producers: Boi-1da; Sweet

"8 Out of 10" is a song by Canadian rapper Drake from his album, Scorpion (2018), the song has reached the top 20 in Canada and the Czech Republic.

== Commercial performance ==
=== North America ===
On July 14, 2018, "8 Out of 10" entered the charts at number 19 on the Billboard Canadian Hot 100 and remained in the top 100 until July 28, 2018. The song spent three weeks on the US Billboard Hot 100, entering the charts at number 21, its immediate peak, on July 14, 2018.

=== Europe ===
On July 12, 2018, "8 Out of 10" entered at number 17 on the Czech Republic chart, becoming Drake's second-highest-charting song from Scorpion, after "Don't Matter to Me" which peaked at number 6.

=== Internationally ===
The song has peaked in the top 40 in Australia, Greece, Norway, Portugal, Slovakia, Sweden and has charted on the charts of Austria, France, Germany, Italy and the Netherlands.

== Charts ==
Chart (2018)	Peak position
Australia (ARIA)	27
Austria (Ö3 Austria Top 40)	64
Canada Hot 100 (Billboard)	19
Czech Republic Singles Digital (ČNS IFPI)	17
France (SNEP)	102
Germany (GfK)	74
Greece International Digital Singles (IFPI)	39
Italy (FIMI)	100
Netherlands (Single Top 100)	41
Norway (VG-lista)	36
Portugal (AFP)	28
Slovakia Singles Digital (ČNS IFPI)	36
Sweden (Sverigetopplistan)	33
UK Audio Streaming (OCC)	14
US Billboard Hot 100	21
US Hot R&B/Hip-Hop Songs (Billboard)	18

== Certifications ==
Certifications for "8 Out of 10"
Region	Certification	Certified units/sales
Australia (ARIA)	Gold	35,000^{‡}
United Kingdom (BPI)	Silver	200,000^{‡}
^{‡} Sales+streaming figures based on certification alone.
