= Elevate (Drake song) =

Song by Drake

from the album Scorpion
- Recorded: 2018
- Genre: Hip hop
- Length: 3:04
- Label: OVO Sound; Cash Money; Young Money
- Songwriter(s): Aubrey Graham; Gary Fountaine; Jahron Brathwaite
- Producer(s): Nonstop da Hitman; PartyNextDoor

"Elevate" is a song by Canadian rapper Drake from his album, Scorpion (2018), The song features additional uncredited vocals by French Montana, the song has reached the top 20 in Canada and the United States.

== Charts ==
Chart (2018)	Peak position
Austria (Ö3 Austria Top 40)	58
Canada (Canadian Hot 100)	15
Czech Republic (Singles Digitál Top 100)	90
France (SNEP)	71
Germany (GfK)	67
Greece International Digital Singles (IFPI)	45
Italy (FIMI)	96
Netherlands (Single Top 100)	48
Portugal (AFP)	21
Slovakia (Singles Digitál Top 100)	47
Sweden (Sverigetopplistan)	53
UK Audio Streaming (OCC)	11
US Billboard Hot 100	14
US Hot R&B/Hip-Hop Songs (Billboard)	13

== Certifications ==
Region	Certification	Certified units/sales
Australia (ARIA)	Gold	35,000^{‡}
Brazil (Pro-Música Brasil)	Gold	20,000^{‡}
Canada (Music Canada)	Gold	40,000^{‡}
United Kingdom (BPI)	Silver	200,000^{‡}
^{‡} Sales+streaming figures based on certification alone.
