= Survival (Drake song) =

Song by Drake

from the album Scorpion
- Recorded: 2018
- Genre: Hip hop
- Length: 2:16
- Label: OVO Sound; Cash Money; Young Money
- Songwriters: Aubrey Graham; Dion Wilson; Noah Shebib; Klaus Netzle; Manuel Landy
- Producer: No I.D.

"Survival" is a song by Canadian rapper Drake from his album, Scorpion (2018), the song has reached the top 20 in Canada, Portugal, and the United States.

== Composition ==
"Survival" is a hip hop song that contains samples from Claude Larson's song "Telex" (1980).

== Commercial performance ==
=== North America ===
On July 14, 2018, "Survival" entered the Billboard Canadian Hot 100 chart at number 18 on and remained in the top 100 until July 28, 2018. The song spent two weeks on the US Billboard Hot 100, entering the chart at number 17, its immediate peak, on July 14, 2018.

=== Internationally ===
The song has peaked in the top 40 in Greece, the Netherlands, Portugal and has charted on the charts of Austria, Czech Republic, France, Germany, Italy, Slovakia, and Sweden.

== Charts ==
Chart (2018)	Peak position
Austria (Ö3 Austria Top 40)	59
Canada Hot 100 (Billboard)	18
Czech Republic Singles Digital (ČNS IFPI)	78
France (SNEP)	68
Germany (GfK)	73
Greece International Digital Singles (IFPI)	38
Italy (FIMI)	79
Netherlands (Single Top 100)	37
Portugal (AFP)	19
Slovakia Singles Digital (ČNS IFPI)	43
Sweden (Sverigetopplistan)	45
UK Audio Streaming (Official Charts)	10
US Billboard Hot 100	17
US Hot R&B/Hip-Hop Songs (Billboard)	15
