= Can't Take a Joke =

Song by Drake

from the album Scorpion
- Recorded: 2018
- Genre: Hip hop; trap
- Length: 2:44
- Label: OVO Sound; Cash Money; Young Money
- Songwriter(s): Aubrey Graham; Max Eberhardt
- Producer(s): ModMaxx

"Can't Take a Joke" is a song by Canadian rapper Drake from his album, Scorpion (2018), the song has reached the top 20 in Canada and the United States.

== Commercial performance ==
=== North America ===
On July 14, 2018, "Can't Take a Joke" entered the charts at number 16 on the Billboard Canadian Hot 100 and remained in the top 100 until August 4, 2018. The song spent four weeks on the US Billboard Hot 100, entering the charts at number 18, its immediate peak, on July 14, 2018.

=== Internationally ===
The song has peaked in the top 40 in Australia and Portugal, and has charted in France, Greece, the Netherlands, Slovakia, and Sweden.

== Charts ==
Chart (2018)	Peak position
Australia (ARIA)	36
Canada (Canadian Hot 100)	16
France (SNEP)	132
Greece International Digital Singles (IFPI)	61
Netherlands (Single Top 100)	60
Portugal (AFP)	38
Slovakia (Singles Digitál Top 100)	76
Sweden (Sverigetopplistan)	75
UK Audio Streaming (OCC)	16
US Billboard Hot 100	18
US Hot R&B/Hip-Hop Songs (Billboard)	16

== Certifications ==
Region	Certification	Certified units/sales
Australia (ARIA)	Gold	35,000^{‡}
Canada (Music Canada)	Gold	40,000^{‡}
United Kingdom (BPI)	Silver	200,000^{‡}
^{‡} Sales+streaming figures based on certification alone.
