= Jaded (Drake song) =

Song by Drake

from the album Scorpion
- Recorded: 2018
- Genre: R&B
- Length: 4:22
- Label: OVO Sound; Cash Money; Young Money
- Songwriter(s): Aubrey Graham; Noel Cadastre; Tyrone Griffin, Jr.
- Producer(s): Cadastre

"Jaded" is a song by Canadian rapper Drake from his album, Scorpion (2018). It was released along with the album on June 29, 2018. The song was co-written by Drake, singer Ty Dolla Sign, and Noel Cadastre, and was produced by the latter. It features additional background vocals by Ty Dolla Sign. R&B singer Jacquees remixed the song. Drake fans have speculated about the identity of the woman described in the lyrics.

== Critical reception ==
While comparing "Jaded' to the Aerosmith's song of the same name, Winston Cook-Wilson writing for Spin called Drake's hit a "slithering, soporific trap ballad" and The Independent, in its review of the album, wrote that the "track falls flat". Nevertheless, the song did well on various charts around the world, reaching the Top 40 in the United States and Canada.

== Charts ==
Chart (2018)	Peak position
Australia (ARIA)	64
Canada (Canadian Hot 100)	36
France (SNEP)	196
Netherlands (Single Top 100)	97
Portugal (AFP)	55
Sweden Heatseeker (Sverigetopplistan)	5
UK Audio Streaming (OCC)	39
US Billboard Hot 100	32
US Hot R&B/Hip-Hop Songs (Billboard)	24

== Certifications ==
Certifications for "Jaded"
Region	Certification	Certified units/sales
Australia (ARIA)	Gold	35,000^{‡}
United Kingdom (BPI)	Silver	200,000^{‡}
^{‡} Sales+streaming figures based on certification alone.
