= Emotionless (Drake song) =

Song by Drake

from the album Scorpion
- Released: June 29, 2018
- Studio: S.O.T.A., Toronto, CA
- Length: 5:02
- Label: OVO Sound; Cash Money; Young Money
- Songwriter(s): Aubrey Graham; Mariah Carey; Robert Clivillés; David Cole; Dion Wilson; Noah Shebib; Andrew Gowie
- Producer(s): No I.D.; 40 (co.); The 25th Hour (add.)

"Emotionless" is a song by Canadian musician Drake from his fifth studio album Scorpion (2018). Drake co-wrote the song with its producers No I.D., Noah "40" Shebib, and The 25th Hour. Mariah Carey, Robert Clivillés, and David Cole received songwriting credits for the sampling of a club remix of Carey's 1991 hit single "Emotions". Commercially, it has reached the top ten in the United Kingdom and the United States, giving Carey her 25th top-ten single as a songwriter in the latter country.

== Personnel ==
Credits adapted from the album's liner notes and Tidal.

- Noel Cadastre – recording
- Noel "Gadget" Campbell – mixing
- Greg Moffet – mixing assistance, recording assistance
- Harley Arsenault – mixing assistance, recording assistance
- Ronald Moonoo – mixing assistance
- Noah "40" Shebib – production, recording
- No I.D. – production
- The 25th Hour – production

== Charts ==
Chart (2018)	Peak position
Australia (ARIA)	12
Austria (Ö3 Austria Top 40)	52
Canada (Canadian Hot 100)	13
Czech Republic (Singles Digitál Top 100)	75
France (SNEP)	78
Germany (GfK)	68
Greece International Digital Singles (IFPI)	23
Ireland (IRMA)	13
Italy (FIMI)	97
Netherlands (Single Top 100)	30
New Zealand (Recorded Music NZ)	27
Portugal (AFP)	15
Scotland (OCC)	93
Slovakia (Singles Digitál Top 100)	38
Sweden (Sverigetopplistan)	38
UK Singles (OCC)	5
UK Hip Hop/R&B (OCC)	4
US Billboard Hot 100	8
US Hot R&B/Hip-Hop Songs (Billboard)	7

== Certifications ==
Region	Certification	Certified units/sales
Australia (ARIA)	Gold	35,000^{‡}
Canada (Music Canada)	Gold	40,000^{‡}
United Kingdom (BPI)	Silver	200,000^{‡}
^{‡} Sales+streaming figures based on certification alone.
