= Talk Up =

Song by Drake featuring Jay-Z

from the album Scorpion
- Recorded: 2018
- Genre: Hip hop
- Length: 3:44
- Label: OVO Sound; Cash Money; Young Money
- Songwriter(s): Aubrey Graham; Shawn Carter; Paul Beauregard; Leroy Bonner; O'Shea Jackson; Marshall Jones; Ralph Middlebrooks; Walter Morisson; Andrew Noland; Gregory Webster; Andre Young; Tim Moore
- Producer(s): DJ Paul

"Talk Up" is a song by Canadian rapper Drake from his album, Scorpion (2018). It features American rapper Jay-Z and additional uncredited vocals by Canadian rapper Baka Not Nice. The song reached the top 20 in Canada and the United States.

== Composition ==
"Talk Up" is a hip hop song that contains samples from N.W.A's song "Dope Man" (1987).

== Commercial performance ==
=== North America ===
On July 14, 2018, "Talk Up" entered the charts at number 17 on the Billboard Canadian Hot 100 and remained in the top 100 until July 28, 2018. The song spent eight weeks on the US Billboard Hot 100, entering the charts at number 20, its immediate peak, on July 14, 2018.

=== Internationally ===
The song peaked in the top 40 in Australia, Greece, Portugal, Slovakia and has charted on the charts of Austria, Czech Republic, France, Germany, the Netherlands and Sweden.

== Charts ==
Chart (2018)	Peak position
Australia (ARIA)	33
Austria (Ö3 Austria Top 40)	71
Canada (Canadian Hot 100)	17
Czech Republic (Singles Digitál Top 100)	61
France (SNEP)	123
Germany (GfK)	83
Greece International Digital Singles (IFPI)	40
Netherlands (Single Top 100)	54
Portugal (AFP)	26
Slovakia (Singles Digitál Top 100)	37
Sweden (Sverigetopplistan)	55
UK Audio Streaming (OCC)	22
US Billboard Hot 100	20
US Hot R&B/Hip-Hop Songs (Billboard)	17
