= BDL Bipolar =

Studio album by Big Narstie
- Released: 6 July 2018
- Genre: Hip hop
- Label: Dice Recordings

BDL Bipolar is the debut album by British rapper Big Narstie, released on 6 July 2018 on Dice Recordings. The album's title is a reference to Narstie's collective the Base Defence League.

== Critical reception ==
Professional ratings
Aggregate scores
Source	Rating
Metacritic	55/100
Review scores
Source	Rating
Clash	6/10
The Guardian	2/5 stars
Mojo	3/5 stars
Q	3/5 stars

The album received mixed reviews from critics. Rachel Aroesti of The Guardian criticised the long running time of the album and the "largely incoherent comedy skits". She said that Narstie seemed "stuck in the past" and "often seems stretched thin, resorting to lazy punning", concluding, "It all adds up to a baggy and frequently baffling record". Alex McFadyen of Clash was more positive, calling Narstie "one of grime's most introspective MCs" and stated, "there are moments on this record where he discusses emotions in a way that is rare amid the hype and excitement of so much grime, and indeed, masculine culture at large", and that "while the juxtaposition of staid instrumentals with subversive lyrics is jarring, he remains a gifted MC, worth hearing out".

== Track listing ==
BDL Bipolar track listing
No.	Title	Length
1.	"BDL Protest Intro (Skit)" (featuring Miles Pudding and Nathan Brown)	0:57
2.	"Woah"	2:34
3.	"Hello Hi 2" (featuring Ed Sheeran)	3:48
4.	"5AM" (featuring Moelogo)	4:03
5.	"Hell No" (featuring Dizmack and Izzie Gibbs)	3:44
6.	"Love Is a Game" (featuring Chu)	3:46
7.	"BDL Radical Speech (Skit)"	2:54
8.	"Grime Battle of Hastings" (featuring the Town Crier)	3:26
9.	"Charlie Sheen" (featuring Hellabandzee)	4:33
10.	"Sunshine" (featuring Craig David and Star.One)	4:21
11.	"Taxi to Brixton (Skit)"	1:16
12.	"Celebrate" (featuring Teedot and Tizzy)	3:14
13.	"Chabuddy G (Skit)"	0:11
14.	"Asian BDL (Skit)"	0:33
15.	"How You Dance" (featuring Panjabi MC and Shizzio)	3:37
16.	"Help" (featuring Laville)	5:40
17.	"Daddy Go Hard" (featuring Nina Alexis and Scouse Tremz)	5:05
18.	"Keith Lemon (Skit)"	0:27
19.	"Sloosha"	3:27
20.	"Lonely Road" (featuring Chu)	5:38
21.	"What Is It Now"	3:09
22.	"Big Bro (Skit)" (featuring Big Bro)	2:43
23.	"Sinners" (featuring Xaviour)	4:05
24.	"Control" (featuring Raleigh Ritchie)	3:43
25.	"Mae Mae (Skit)" (featuring Mae Mae)	0:50
26.	"Blood" (featuring Takura)	5:03
