= Lausse the Cat =

British hip-hop artist

Lausse the Cat is a French-British alternative hip-hop artist. Originally from Camden, London but currently residing in Leeds, Lausse the Cat first achieved a cult following on Soundcloud in the late 2010s, particularly with the release of his debut EP, The Girl, The Cat and the Tree (2018). The artist's real identity is currently unknown: Lausse the Cat is an alter ego, portrayed in his music as a lonely stray cat struggling with substance abuse and alcoholism. The artist wears a cat mask during live performances to preserve his anonymity.

== Career ==
Lausse the Cat first rose to prominence as a university student in Leeds, where he participated in the city's jazz scene, making sporadic live appearances. During one such appearance at a house party, Lausse met now regular collaborator Nix Northwest. Other artists he met during this period and began regularly collaborating with were B-ahwe and Poppy Daniels.

After the release of The Girl, the Cat and the Tree, Lausse retreated from live performance and public musical releases for several years, stating in a live event in 2024 that he was working on his second album The Mocking Stars. During his time living across Europe, speculation about the reasons behind his hiatus proliferated on social media. In November 2025, Lausse returned from his hiatus and released the album The Mocking Stars.

== Artistry ==
Lausse's songwriting has been noted for its introspection and vulnerability, as well as for its elaborately depicted characters and settings. His storylines are generally described as "noir and downbeat", with themes frequently touching upon alcoholism/substance use, melancholy, escapism and the search for meaning. The lyrics often border on surrealism, with a heavy use of narration. The artist has cited MF Doom as an artistic influence.

Musically, Lausse the Cat makes use of sonorities taken from various genres, including jazz, lo-fi, trap, grime and house. He frequently uses samples. Theo Farrant of Yahoo News UK identifies "jazzy" and "lo-fi" traits in Lausse's beats, and Richard Zagaglia of Sentireascoltare describes his instrumentation as incorporating cool jazz and bossa nova.

For each of his releases, Lausse the Cat releases cover art designed by his cousin Cals Castle.

== Discography ==
=== The Girl, The Cat and The Tree ===
Released: 3 August 2018
Label: Velvet Blues
Format: EP, Digital download

Track listing
No.	Title	Length
1.	"Intro (Soundcloud)"	0:30
2.	"Motor City"	3:18
3.	"Drink With The Leaves" (ft. The Young Wizard)	2:24
4.	"Toy's Story"	3:22
5.	"Fuccboi Lullaby"	5:04
6.	"Cat's Demise"	2:23
7.	"Belle Bouteille"	3:51

Lausse the Cat's first EP, The Girl, The Cat and The Tree, introduces recurring themes of depression, addiction, nihilism and patterns of self-destruction. Musically, it borrows heavily from jazz and lo-fi hip-hop. It features Nix Northwest as a narrator, and features raps in both French and English. The EP has attracted praise for its open and reflective discussion of topics such as mental health, casual sex, and substance abuse. Various outlets have described its overarching storyline as "unwaveringly honest and introspective", "surrealistic", "creative and unique", with "a narrative structure typical of a fairy-tale".

=== The Mocking Stars ===
Released: 6 November 2025
Label: Velvet Blues
Format: Album, Digital download

Track listing
No.	Title	Length
1.	"Blue Bossa"	6:29
2.	"I.D.W.G.A.J"	6:18
3.	"The Midnight Hour"	4:33
4.	"A Dour Sun"	0:53
5.	"The Mocking Stars"	10:45
6.	"Space Cadet Cat"	5:53
7.	"Cackles of the Mad"	1:31
8.	"Tea Party"	3:55
9.	"Keep On Walking"	5:23
10.	"The Moonlight Waltz"	3:26
11.	"Peonies for Breakfast"	5:18
12.	"Lotus Blossom"	7:56

Following a seven-year hiatus, Lausse the Cat unveiled released his first studio album, The Mocking Stars, in late 2025. It has been commented on as "an even more ambitious outing than its predecessor", and as "steeped in a cosmic atmosphere but deeply rooted in the monotony of the everyday". Similar to his first extended project, The Mocking Stars borrows heavily from jazz and features bilingual rapping, however corresponds less squarely to the lo-fi hip-hop genre, drawing on various other influences such as bossa nova and musical theatre. The album develops on previously touched-upon themes of escapism, substance abuse, loneliness and fleeting romantic attachment, explored this time through a dual/alternating thematic interplay between the allegories of night and day.
