= That's How You Feel =

Song by Drake

from the album Scorpion
- Released: June 29, 2018
- Recorded: 2016
- Genre: Hip hop
- Length: 2:37
- Label: Young Money; Cash Money; Republic
- Songwriters: Aubrey Graham; John Hyszko; Noel Cadastre; Onika Maraj
- Producer: Cadastre

"That's How You Feel" is a song by Canadian rapper Drake. It was produced by Noel Cadastre. The song samples Nicki Minaj's verse on the remix of the group PTAF's "Boss Ass Bitch". The song almost entirely features Drake rapping and only contains a few lines provided by Minaj, from her performance of her verse on "Boss Ass Bitch", live at Power 106's PowerHouse at the Honda Center in Anaheim. The song also features additional background vocals by DJ Boof.

Commercially, the song peaked at number 37 on the US Billboard Hot 100 and entered the top 30 on Hot R&B/Hip-Hop Songs charts.

== Composition ==
"That's How You Feel" is two minutes and thirty-seven seconds long and is an up-beat tempo hip-hop song. The song, which was produced by Cadastre, is built upon a sample of Minaj verse on "Boss Ass Bitch" by PTAF group.

== Critical reception ==
Andrew Buncombe wrote for Pitchfork, "Before the track even starts, you already know how this one's going to go from the title. And 'That's How I Feel' has a classic Drake feel without overstaying its welcome (the shortest track on the B side of Scorpion). From beginning to end, the instrumental doesn't really change. We're instead left with Drake's flow offering any changes that happen in the song, plus a sample of Nicki Minaj from a live show dating back to 2014..."

== Charts ==
Chart (2018)	Peak position
Australia (ARIA)	62
Canada Hot 100 (Billboard)	34
Netherlands (Single Top 100)	85
Portugal (AFP)	67
Sweden Heatseeker (Sverigetopplistan)	9
UK Audio Streaming (OCC)	38
US Billboard Hot 100	37
US Hot R&B/Hip-Hop Songs (Billboard)	26

== Certifications ==
Certifications for "That's How You Feel"
Region	Certification	Certified units/sales
Australia (ARIA)	Gold	35,000^{‡}
^{‡} Sales+streaming figures based on certification alone.
