= Mob Ties =

Single by Drake

from the album Scorpion
- Released: January 6, 2019
- Recorded: 2018
- Genre: Hip hop; trap
- Length: 3:25
- Label: Young Money; Cash Money
- Songwriters: Aubrey Graham; Matthew Samuels; Allen Ritter; Tavoris Hollins, Jr.; Dave Atkinson; Samuel Barnes; Anthony Cruz; Nasir Jones; Inga Marchand; Asheley Turner; Cory McKay; Jean-Claude Olivier
- Producers: Boi-1da; Ritter

Drake singles chronology
"Mia" (2018)	"Mob Ties" (2019)	"Going Bad" (2019)

"Mob Ties" is a song by Canadian rapper Drake from his album, Scorpion (2018). It was released as the seventh single from the album on January 6, 2019. The song was produced by Boi-1da and Allen Ritter. The song features additional background vocals by Asheley Turner. It reached the top 20 in Canada and the United States.

== Composition ==
"Mob Ties" is a trap song that contains samples from Nas's song "Affirmative Action" (1996).

== Commercial performance ==
=== North America ===
On July 14, 2018, "Mob Ties" entered the charts at number 11 and spent 13 weeks on the Billboard Canadian Hot 100 and remained in the top 100 until October 6, 2018. The song spent eight weeks on the US Billboard Hot 100, entering the charts at number 13, its immediate peak, on July 14, 2018.

=== Internationally ===
The song has peaked in the top 40 in Australia, Greece, Portugal and has charted on the charts of Austria, France, Germany, the Netherlands, Slovakia, and Sweden.

== Charts ==
=== Weekly charts ===
Chart (2018–2019)	Peak position
Australia (ARIA)	28
Austria (Ö3 Austria Top 40)	67
Canada Hot 100 (Billboard)	11
France (SNEP)	85
Germany (GfK)	82
Greece International Digital Singles (IFPI)	26
Ireland (IRMA)	92
Netherlands (Single Top 100)	45
Portugal (AFP)	31
Slovakia Singles Digital (ČNS IFPI)	56
Sweden (Sverigetopplistan)	61
UK Audio Streaming (OCC)	13
US Billboard Hot 100	13
US Hot R&B/Hip-Hop Songs (Billboard)	12

=== Year-end charts ===
Chart (2018)	Position
US Hot R&B/Hip-Hop Songs (Billboard)	94

== Certifications ==
Region	Certification	Certified units/sales
Australia (ARIA)	Platinum	70,000^{‡}
Canada (Music Canada)	Gold	40,000^{‡}
Portugal (AFP)	Gold	5,000^{‡}
United Kingdom (BPI)	Gold	400,000^{‡}
^{‡} Sales+streaming figures based on certification alone.

== Release history ==
Country	Date	Format	Label(s)	Ref.
United States	January 6, 2019	Urban contemporary radio	Young Money; Cash Money; Republic	
