= Scorpion (Drake album) =

2018 studio album by Drake

Studio album by Drake
- Released: June 29, 2018
- Studios: NightBird (West Hollywood); Ritz Carlton; S.O.T.A. (Toronto); Sandra Gale (Yolo Estate, California); Studio 5020 (Miami)
- Genres: Hip hop; R&B; pop
- Length: 89:44
- Labels: Cash Money; Republic; Young Money
- Producers: 40; Allen Ritter; Blaqnmild; Boi-1da; Capo; Cardo; DJ Paul; DJ Premier; Jahaan Sweet; ModMaxx; Murda Beatz; No I.D.; Nonstop da Hitman; Oogie Mane; Preme; Shaun Harris; Supah Mario; T-Minus; Tay Keith; TrapMoneyBenny; Wallis Lane; Yung Exclusive

Drake chronology
Scary Hours (2018)	Scorpion (2018)	The Best in the World Pack (2019)

Singles from Scorpion
- 1. "God's Plan" Released: January 19, 2018; 2. "Nice for What" Released: April 6, 2018; 3. "I'm Upset" Released: May 26, 2018; 4. "Don't Matter to Me" Released: July 6, 2018; 5. "In My Feelings" Released: July 10, 2018; 6. "Nonstop" Released: July 31, 2018; 7. "Mob Ties" Released: January 6, 2019

Scorpion is the fifth studio album by Canadian rapper Drake. It was released on June 29, 2018, by Cash Money Records, Republic Records, and Young Money Entertainment. Scorpion is a double album consisting of 25 tracks. Its first disc is primarily hip hop, while its second disc has been described as R&B and pop. It was executive produced by Drake, alongside frequent collaborator 40 and manager Oliver El-Khatib. Scorpion features guest appearances from Jay-Z and Ty Dolla Sign, as well as posthumous appearances from Michael Jackson and Static Major.

Lyrically, Scorpion sees Drake rap about topics that have been common in his discography, including anxiety, relationships, and his rise from underdog to a prominent figure in music. The production draws influence from a range of genres, including soul, ambient, quiet storm, R&B, pop, electronica, and trap.

Scorpion was supported by the singles "God's Plan", "Nice for What", "I'm Upset", "Don't Matter to Me", "In My Feelings", "Nonstop", and "Mob Ties". All seven singles reached the top twenty on the US Billboard Hot 100, with three of them reaching number one: "God's Plan", "Nice for What", and "In My Feelings". In its first day of release, Scorpion broke Spotify's one-day global record for album streams with 132.45 million streams. It also broke Apple Music's single-day record with 170 million streams, breaking Drake's own record set with More Life.

Scorpion received generally favorable reviews from critics, with praise directed at the quality of its tracks but criticism directed at the album's length as a whole. Despite this, it was a commercial success, debuting atop the US Billboard 200 with 732,000 album-equivalent units, of which 160,000 came from pure sales. The album received five nominations at the 2019 Grammy Awards, including Album of the Year, and "God's Plan" won Best Rap Song. It also won Drake a second Top Billboard 200 Album of his career at the 2019 Billboard Music Awards, among other awards. It has been certified nine-times platinum by the Recording Industry Association of America (RIAA).

== Background ==
Drake announced the album on Instagram on April 16, 2018, followed by the announcement of its release date on June 14. Two days before release, Scorpion was confirmed to be a double album, Drake's first, after a promotional billboard alluded to the format. The double album consists of a rap-oriented side and an R&B-oriented side, the two genres that Drake focuses on.

Prior to the album's release, Drake became engaged in a rivalry with American rapper Pusha T. In May 2018, after Drake released a diss track titled "Duppy Freestyle" in response to Pusha T's album Daytona, Pusha T released "The Story of Adidon" which alleged that Drake had a secret child. Scorpion finally addressed the rumor, and later Drake admitted to having a son named Adonis, with French porn actress Sophie Brussaux. In response to Pusha T's diss track, critics highlighted that the album's title, Scorpion, was a response to Drake's critics.

== Themes and production ==
Lyrically, Scorpion sees Drake rap about topics that have been common in his discography, including claustrophobia caused by his fame, complications of relationships, and boasting about his rise from the "underdog" to a prominent figure in music. The production features twisted soul samples, ambient, quiet storm, R&B, pop, electronica, and trap.

== Release and promotion ==
On January 19, 2018, Drake released the two-track extended play Scary Hours. It included the singles "Diplomatic Immunity" and "God's Plan", the latter of which served as the lead single to Scorpion after debuting at number one on the US Billboard Hot 100. Following this, Drake released the album's second single "Nice for What" on April 6, which also charted in the same position. On May 26, the third single "I'm Upset" was released. On July 6, the song "Don't Matter to Me" was sent to British contemporary hit radio as the album's fourth single. On July 10, the song "In My Feelings" was sent to the US rhythmic and contemporary hit radio as the album's fifth single. The song later went on to become the third song off the album to reach number one on the US Billboard Hot 100. "Nonstop" was released to rhythmic radio in the US as the album's sixth single on July 31. "Mob Ties" was released to urban contemporary airplay in the US as the album's seventh single on January 6, 2019.

A series of billboards promoting the album surfaced in Toronto, on June 22, while a trailer for the album was released on June 26. The album's promotion on the streaming service Spotify attracted some controversy from its subscribers for what they perceived to be excessive promotion, with Drake appearing in most of the service's editorial playlists, including ones which he had nothing to do with, such as those for electronic dance music and even gospel music. Following the release of the album, Drake also embarked on his second co-headlining tour with Migos, Aubrey & the Three Migos Tour, which began on August 12, 2018, in Kansas City.

== Critical reception ==
Professional ratings
Aggregate scores
Source	Rating
AnyDecentMusic?	6.1/10
Metacritic	67/100
Review scores
Source	Rating
AllMusic	2/5 stars
The A.V. Club	B−
The Daily Telegraph	4/5 stars
Entertainment Weekly	C+
The Guardian	3/5 stars
NME	3/5 stars
The Observer	4/5 stars
Pitchfork	6.9/10
Rolling Stone	3.5/5 stars
XXL	4/5

Scorpion was met with generally favorable reviews from critics. At Metacritic, which assigns a normalized rating out of 100 to reviews from professional publications, the album received an average score of 67, based on 26 reviews, indicating "generally favorable reviews". Aggregator AnyDecentMusic? gave it 6.1 out of 10, based on their assessment of the critical consensus.

Neil McCormick of The Daily Telegraph deemed the album's first side as a "sharply focused hip-hop album, with Drake delivering eloquent zingers," while he thought the second half "showcases Drake's flip side, sensitive R'n'B loverman." Alexis Petridis of The Guardian wrote that the album "is frequently fantastic, making a stronger claim for Drake's greatness than any amount of swaggering braggadocio", but also noted "there isn't quite enough strong material here to support its gargantuan running time." Mikael Wood of Los Angeles Times commented, "yet for all its tiresome megalomania, [the album] is so beautifully rendered—from vocals to samples to features to beats..."; though he also noted Drake "tired and tiring." Nick Flanagan of Now mentioned the A side as "mostly introspective threats, neurotic boasting and paranoia about enemies", while the B side as "the same but with a focus on women and his love life", labelling the album "well within his pocket." For The Independent, Roisin O'Connor described the album as "oddly erratic... The way he darts between different sounds is exhausting and, ultimately, messy. On certain tracks he raps like he has something to prove, on others it's like he has nothing."

In a mixed review, Andy Hutchins of Time said, "[the] ponderous choice to cleave the overstuffed Scorpion into Sides A and B results in two uneven suites of songs." while "a long-frustrating inability to self-edit mars [the album]." NME's Luke Morgan Britton noted a "lack of quality control", and felt the album "simply doesn't need to be" 25-track long. Jamieson Cox of Pitchfork described Scorpion as a "fascinating, flawed album". He praised the consistency of the album's individual songs for a "bloated streaming-era release", especially those included on side B, as well as the album's "sumptuous sound", however criticized Drake's lack of musical and lyrical development, concluding by noting a sense of redundancy in Drake's subject matter: "It's not like Drake needs to serve as a beacon of moral clarity, but this year's paternity saga—and with Scorpion, its ostensible conclusion—has revealed his shortcomings as a writer and pop personality. Whether it's 2011 or 2018, you're getting the same guy: anxious, calculating, and self-obsessed, with a golden ear and a fondness for terrible punchlines. Fatherhood hasn't made him grow up—and if you've gotten older and wiser, Scorpion just feels like the latest in a series of diminishing returns."

In a negative review, The Hollywood Reporter's Jonny Coleman said "Drake's exhausting, uneven double rap/RnB record finds the artist trying to be all things to all people." Coleman said "the best part of this double album—like much of Drake's discography—is the production. Of course, it's the result of a whopping 32 producers being commissioned for the 25 songs in the package [...] As a result, there are some interesting sonic moments, even if there isn't much cohesion outside of an affinity for low frequencies and baroque existential loops." For The Washington Post, Chris Richards considered the album "soggy", expressed discomfort about Drake using the same formula in "melody-bruised grievances", and concluded "hearing him do impersonations of more inventive artists is a specific kind of sadness that we usually see only on late night television." In his review for AllMusic, Tim Sendra concluded that the album "doesn't even come close to being one of his best; instead, it's a one-trick record stretched out into 25 endless tracks by an artist who's so deep into the self-obsessed, self-pitying rut he created for himself that he can't see daylight anymore... It's a bleak and tiring place to spend time, and one can only hope that Drake himself gets weary of it soon, too." For The Irish Times, Dean Van Nguyen described the album as "a painfully dull barrage of lifeless tunes."

=== Year-end lists ===
Select year-end rankings of Scorpion
Publication	List	Rank	Ref.
Billboard	The 50 Best Albums of 2018	15	
Clash	Clash Albums of the Year 2018	13	
Complex	The 50 Best Albums of 2018	34	
Rolling Stone	50 Best Albums of 2018	10	
Uproxx	The 50 Best Albums of 2018	43	
Vibe	30 Best Albums of 2018	6	

=== Industry awards ===
Awards and nominations for Scorpion
Year	Ceremony	Category	Result	Ref.
2018	American Music Awards	Favorite Pop/Rock Album	Nominated	
2018	American Music Awards	Favorite Rap/Hip-Hop Album	Nominated	
2018	BET Hip Hop Awards	Album of the Year	Nominated	
2019	Billboard Music Awards	Top Billboard 200 Album	Won	
2019	Billboard Music Awards	Top Rap Album	Won	
2019	Grammy Awards	Album of the Year	Nominated	

== Commercial performance ==
Scorpion was certified platinum by the Recording Industry Association of America (RIAA) a day before release due to a technicality that incorporates the track-equivalent units moved by the previously released singles "God's Plan", "Nice for What" and "I'm Upset".

In its first day of release, Scorpion broke Spotify's then-one-day global record for album streams with 132.45 million streams, more than 50 million plays greater than the previous record, set by Post Malone's Beerbongs & Bentleys two months earlier. It also broke Apple Music's single-day record with 170 million streams, breaking Drake's own record set with More Life.

In Drake's home country of Canada, Scorpion sold 70,000 album-equivalent units in its opening week. It serves as Drake's eighth number-one album in the country. The album earned 34,000 album-equivalent units in the second week, marking the third highest sales week in 2018. In 2018, Scorpion was ranked as the most popular album of the year on the Canadian Albums Chart. In 2018 the album earned 424,000 on-demand audio consumption units in the country.

In the United States, Scorpion opened atop the Billboard 200 with 732,000 album-equivalent units, which included 160,000 pure album sales, making it the biggest first week of the year at the time. It became his eighth entry in a row to top the chart and broke the country's streaming record with 745.92 million streams in its first week. Although debuting at number one, the album serves as Drake's lowest first-week pure sales of his career, selling 692,000 less pure copies than Views, and 66,000 less than More Life. All 25 tracks on the album entered the Billboard Hot 100 and Drake also became the first musician to simultaneously debut four new songs inside the top 10 of the US Hot 100, with "Nonstop" (at 2), "In My Feelings" (6), "Emotionless" (8), and "Don't Matter to Me" featuring Michael Jackson (9), and seven tracks simultaneously in the top 10 of the chart, becoming only the fourth album to have seven top 10 singles, and the first to achieve this since 1991. As of December 2019, the album has sold over 5,055,000 album-equivalent units in the US, with over 379,000 being pure sales.

In the United Kingdom, the album debuted at number one on the UK Albums Chart, with 64,000 album-equivalent units, becoming Drake's second number-one album on the chart. It remained atop the chart for a second week. In 2018, Scorpion was ranked as the fifth most popular album of the year on the UK Albums Chart. As of January 2019, Scorpion has sold over 300,000 combined sales in the United Kingdom.

== Track listing ==
A Side
No.	Title	Writer(s)	Producer(s)	Length
1.	"Survival"	Aubrey Graham; Dion Wilson; Noah Shebib; Klaus Netzle; Manuel Landy	No I.D.; 40^{[b]}	2:16
2.	"Nonstop"	Graham; Brytavious Chambers; Wilson	Tay Keith; No I.D.^{[a]}; Noel Cadastre^{[b]}	3:58
3.	"Elevate"	Graham; Gary Fountaine; Jahron Brathwaite	Nonstop da Hitman; PartyNextDoor^{[a]}	3:04
4.	"Emotionless"	Graham; Mariah Carey; Robert Clivillés; David Cole; Wilson; Shebib; Andrew Gowie	No I.D.; 40^{[a]}; The 25th Hour^{[b]}	5:02
5.	"God's Plan"	Graham; Daveon Jackson; Matthew Samuels; Shebib; Ronald LaTour; Brock Korsan	Cardo; Yung Exclusive; Boi-1da; 40^{[b]}	3:19
6.	"I'm Upset"	Graham; Jordan Ortiz	Oogie Mane	3:34
7.	"8 Out of 10"	Graham; Samuels; Jahaan Sweet; Matthew O'Brien; Abrim Tilmon; Leon Ware; Arthur Ross	Boi-1da; Sweet; OB O'Brien^{[b]}	3:15
8.	"Mob Ties"	Graham; Samuels; Allen Ritter; Tavoris Hollins, Jr.; Dave Atkinson; Samuel Barnes; Anthony Cruz; Nasir Jones; Inga Marchand; Cory McKay; Jean-Claude Olivier	Boi-1da; Ritter	3:25
9.	"Can't Take a Joke"	Graham; Max Eberhardt	ModMaxx	2:43
10.	"Sandra's Rose"	Graham; Maneesh Bidaye; Christopher Martin	DJ Premier; Maneesh^{[b]}	3:36
11.	"Talk Up" (featuring Jay-Z)	Graham; Shawn Carter; Paul Beauregard; Leroy Bonner; O'Shea Jackson; Marshall Jones; Ralph Middlebrooks; Walter Morisson; Andrew Noland; Gregory Webster; Andre Young; Tim Moore	DJ Paul; TWhy Xclusive^{[c]}	3:43
12.	"Is There More"	Graham; Nima Jahanbin; Paimon Jahanbin; Raynford Humphrey; Jeffrey Rashad; Stephen Garrett; Timothy Mosley	Wallis Lane; Preme; Rashad^{[a]}	3:46
Total length:				41:41

B Side
No.	Title	Writer(s)	Producer(s)	Length
1.	"Peak"	Graham; Shebib; Adrian Eccleston	40	3:26
2.	"Summer Games"	Graham; Shebib; Wilson; Harley Arsenault; Anthony Jefferies; Bidaye	40; No I.D.	4:07
3.	"Jaded"	Graham; Tyrone Griffin, Jr.; Noel Cadastre	Cadastre	4:22
4.	"Nice for What"	Graham; Shane Lindstrom; Shebib; Alan Bergman; Marilyn Bergman; Dennis Coles; Robert Diggs; Gary Grice; Marvin Hamlisch; Lamont Hawkins; Lauryn Hill; Jason Hunter; Russell Jones; Clifford Smith; Corey Woods; Orville Hall; Phillip Price; Bryan Williams; Byron Thomas; Glenshie Rowe	Murda Beatz; Blaqnmild^{[a]}; 40^{[b]}; Corey Litwin^{[b]}	3:30
5.	"Finesse"	Graham; James Fauntleroy; Cadastre	Cadastre	3:02
6.	"Ratchet Happy Birthday"	Graham; Brathwaite; Samuels; Dalton Tennant; Sweet; Leonard Caston; Anita Poree	Boi-1da; Sweet^{[a]}; D10^{[a]}	3:27
7.	"That's How You Feel"	Graham; Cadastre; John Hyszko; Onika Maraj	Cadastre	2:37
8.	"Blue Tint"	Graham; Nayvadius Wilburn; Jonathan Priester; Ramon Ibanga, Jr.; Danny Snodgrass, Jr.; Jabrielle Brooks	Supah Mario; Illmind^{[a]}; Taz Taylor^{[c]}; JR Hitmaker^{[c]}	2:42
9.	"In My Feelings"	Graham; Caresha Brownlee; Jatavia Johnson; Benny Workman; Shebib; Dwayne Carter, Jr.; Garrett; Darius Harrison; James Scheffer; Rex Zamor; Renetta Lowe-Bridgewater; Hall; Price	TrapMoneyBenny; Blaqnmild; 40^{[b]}	3:37
10.	"Don't Matter to Me" (with Michael Jackson)	Graham; Michael Jackson; Paul Anka; Shebib; Jefferies; Nana Rogues; Negin Djafari	40; Nineteen85	4:05
11.	"After Dark" (featuring Static Major and Ty Dolla Sign)	Graham; Garrett; Cameron Thomaz; Shebib; Musze; Melvin Ragin; Joe Kent	Capo; Shaun Harris; 40^{[a]}; Static Major^{[a]}	4:49
12.	"Final Fantasy"	Graham; Samuels; Shebib; Sweet; Michel Legrand; A. Bergman; M. Bergman	Boi-1da; 40; Sweet^{[a]}	3:39
13.	"March 14"	Graham; A. Lambert; Hue Strother; Michael Williams; Martin Prospere; Philip Coleman, Jr.; Tyler Williams; Joshua Valle; Michael Archer; Raphael Saadiq; Nathan Morris; Shawn Stockman	T-Minus; Valle^{[a]}	5:09
Total length:				48:32

Notes

- ^{^[a]} signifies a co-producer
- ^{^[b]} signifies an additional producer
- ^{^[c]} signifies an uncredited additional producer
- "Elevate" features uncredited vocals by French Montana
- "Mob Ties" features background vocals by Asheley Turner
- "Talk Up" features background vocals by Baka Not Nice
- "Is There More" features additional vocals by Nai Palm
- "Peak" features background vocals by Stefflon Don, Rhea Kpaka and Vinessa Douglas
- "Jaded" features background vocals by Ty Dolla Sign
- "Finesse" features background vocals by James Fauntleroy
- "Nice for What" features additional vocals by Big Freedia, 5th Ward Weebie and Glenshie "Bobby Jean" Rowe
- "Ratchet Happy Birthday" features background vocals by PartyNextDoor
- "That's How You Feel" features concert vocals by Nicki Minaj and background vocals by DJ Boof
- "Blue Tint" features additional vocals by Future
- "In My Feelings" features additional vocals by the City Girls
- "Don't Matter to Me" features additional vocals by Paul Anka
- "After Dark" features additional vocals by Al Wood
- "Final Fantasy" features background vocals by Daniel Daley
- "March 14" features additional vocals by James Fauntleroy

Sample credits

- "Survival" contains samples from "Telex", written by Klaus Netzle and Manuel Landy, as performed by Claude Larson.
- "Nonstop" contains samples from "My Head Is Spinning", as performed by DJ Squeeky and Mack Daddy Ju.
- "Emotionless" contains samples and excerpts from "Emotions (12" Club Mix)", written by Mariah Carey, Robert Clivillés and David Cole, as performed by Mariah Carey.
- "8 Out of 10" contains excerpts from "You're Gettin' a Little Too Smart", written by Abrim Tilmon, as performed by the Detroit Emeralds; an audio snippet of Plies; and portions and excerpts from "All the Way Round", written by Arthur Ross and Leon Ware, as performed by Marvin Gaye.
- "Mob Ties" contains interpolations from "Affirmative Action", written by Dave Atkinson, Samuel Barnes, Anthony Cruz, Nasir Jones, Inga Marchand, Cory McKay and Jean-Claude Olivier, as performed by Nas.
- "Talk Up" contains excerpts from "Dopeman", written by Leroy Bonner, O'Shea Jackson, Marshall Jones, Ralph Middlebrooks, Walter Morisson, Andrew Noland, Gregory Webster and Andre Young, as performed by N.W.A.
- "Is There More" contains interpolations from "More Than a Woman", written by Stephen Garrett and Timothy Mosley, as performed by Aaliyah.
- "Nice for What" contains samples from "Ex-Factor", written by Russell Jones, Dennis Coles, Corey Woods, Lamont Hawkins, Gary Grice, Clifford Smith, Robert Diggs, Jason Hunter, Lauryn Hill, Alan Bergman, Marilyn Bergman and Marvin Hamlisch, as performed by Lauryn Hill; "Drag Rap (Triggerman)", written by Orville Hall and Phillip Price, as performed by the Show Boys; and "Get Ya Roll On", written by Byron Thomas and Bryan Williams, as performed by Big Tymers.
- "Ratchet Happy Birthday" contains portions and excerpts from "Just Memories", written by Leonard Caston and Anita Poree, as performed by Eddie Kendricks.
- "That's How You Feel" contains samples and excerpts from "Boss", written and performed by Nicki Minaj.
- "In My Feelings" contains portions from "Lollipop", written by Dwayne Carter Jr., Stephen Garrett, Darius Harrison, James Scheffer and Rex Zamor, as performed by Lil Wayne; samples from "Smoking Gun (Acapella Version)", written and performed by Magnolia Shorty; "Drag Rap (Triggerman)", written by Orville Hall and Phillip Price, as performed by the Show Boys; and an uncredited portion from the episode "Champagne Papi" of television series Atlanta.
- "After Dark" contains samples and excerpts from "The Suite Theme", written by Musze and Melvin Ragin, as performed by Maxwell.
- "Final Fantasy" contains portions from "The Windmills of Your Mind", written by Michel Legrand, Alan Bergman and Marilyn Bergman, as performed by Dorothy Ashby.
- "March 14" contains samples and excerpts from "Lady", written by Michael Archer and Raphael Saadiq; and "Khalil", written by Nathan Morris and Shawn Stockman, as performed by Boyz II Men.

== Personnel ==
Credits adapted from the album's liner notes and Tidal.

Musicians

- Noah Shebib – additional instruments (tracks 1, 24), additional keyboards (tracks 4, 5), all instruments (tracks 14, 16, 22)
- Adrian "X" Eccelston – additional guitar (tracks 13, 23, 24)
- Dion Wilson – all instruments (track 14)
- Harley Arsenault – additional drum programming (track 14)
- Maneesh Bidaye – additional keyboards (track 14)
- Anthony Jefferies – additional keyboards (track 14), all instruments (track 22)
- Darrell Freeman – additional bass (tracks 18, 22, 23, 24)
- Noel Cadastre – all instruments (tracks 15, 17, 19)

Technical

- Noah Shebib – recording (all tracks)
- Noel Cadastre – recording (tracks 2–9, 11, 14–17, 19, 20, 23–25)
- Young Guru – recording (track 11)
- James Royo – recording (tracks 15, 24)
- Mike Gaydusek – recording (track 16)
- Quaz – recording assistance (tracks 5, 8, 15, 19, 20, 23, 24)
- Robbie Meza – recording assistance (tracks 5, 8, 15, 19, 20, 23, 24)
- Todd Norman – recording assistance (tracks 15, 24)
- Chris Quock – recording assistance (track 16)
- Noel "Gadget" Campbell – mixing (tracks 1–11, 16–24)
- Harley Arsenault – mixing assistance (all tracks), recording assistance (tracks 1, 4, 7, 8, 10, 11, 17, 18, 20–23)
- Greg Moffet – mixing assistance (all tracks), recording assistance (tracks 1, 2, 4, 7–11, 17, 18, 20–23)
- Ronald Moonoo – mixing assistance (all tracks)
- PartyNextDoor – vocal engineering (track 18)
- Eric Manco – vocal engineering (track 20)
- Parks – engineering (track 10)
- Chris Athens – mastering (all tracks)
- David "D.C." Castro – mastering assistance (all tracks)
- Lindsay Warner – DAW systems engineering (all tracks)

Additional personnel

- Deborah Mannis-Gardner – sample clearance
- Norman Wong – cover photo
- Bolade Banjo – insert photo
- Julian Consuegra – design and layout

== Charts ==
=== Weekly charts ===
Chart performance for Scorpion
Chart (2018)	Peak position
Australian Albums (ARIA)	1
Austrian Albums (Ö3 Austria)	4
Belgian Albums (Ultratop Flanders)	2
Belgian Albums (Ultratop Wallonia)	3
Canadian Albums (Billboard)	1
Czech Albums (ČNS IFPI)	1
Danish Albums (Hitlisten)	1
Dutch Albums (Album Top 100)	1
Finnish Albums (Suomen virallinen lista)	1
French Albums (SNEP)	3
German Albums (Offizielle Top 100)	8
Irish Albums (Official Charts)	1
Italian Albums (FIMI)	2
Japan Hot Albums (Billboard Japan)	82
Japanese Albums (Oricon)	90
New Zealand Albums (RMNZ)	1
Norwegian Albums (VG-lista)	1
Polish Albums (ZPAV)	36
Portuguese Albums (AFP)	13
Scottish Albums (Official Charts)	7
Slovak Albums (ČNS IFPI)	1
Spanish Albums (Promusicae)	40
Swedish Albums (Sverigetopplistan)	1
Swiss Albums (Schweizer Hitparade)	1
UK Albums (Official Charts)	1
UK R&B Albums (Official Charts)	1
US Billboard 200	1
US Top R&B/Hip-Hop Albums (Billboard)	1

=== Year-end charts ===
2018 year-end chart performance for Scorpion
Chart (2018)	Position
Australian Albums (ARIA)	7
Austrian Albums (Ö3 Austria)	65
Belgian Albums (Ultratop Flanders)	15
Belgian Albums (Ultratop Wallonia)	62
Canadian Albums (Billboard)	1
Danish Albums (Hitlisten)	4
Dutch Albums (MegaCharts)	6
French Albums (SNEP)	62
German Albums (Offizielle Top 100)	78
Icelandic Albums (Plötutíóindi)	14
Irish Albums (IRMA)	8
Italian Albums (FIMI)	55
New Zealand Albums (RMNZ)	6
Swedish Albums (Sverigetopplistan)	17
Swiss Albums (Schweizer Hitparade)	35
UK Albums (OCC)	5
US Billboard 200	2
US Top R&B/Hip-Hop Albums (Billboard)	1

2019 year-end chart performance for Scorpion
Chart (2019)	Position
Australian Albums (ARIA)	20
Belgian Albums (Ultratop Flanders)	34
Belgian Albums (Ultratop Wallonia)	151
Canadian Albums (Billboard)	5
Danish Albums (Hitlisten)	26
Dutch Albums (Album Top 100)	23
French Albums (SNEP)	131
Icelandic Albums (Plötutíóindi)	52
Irish Albums (IRMA)	25
New Zealand Albums (RMNZ)	19
UK Albums (OCC)	27
US Billboard 200	6
US Top R&B/Hip-Hop Albums (Billboard)	2

2020 year-end chart performance for Scorpion
Chart (2020)	Position
Australian Albums (ARIA)	46
Belgian Albums (Ultratop Flanders)	68
Canadian Albums (Billboard)	32
Danish Albums (Hitlisten)	71
Dutch Albums (Album Top 100)	54
New Zealand Albums (RMNZ)	39
UK Albums (OCC)	64
US Billboard 200	40
US Top R&B/Hip-Hop Albums (Billboard)	23

2021 year-end chart performance for Scorpion
Chart (2021)	Position
Australian Albums (ARIA)	75
Belgian Albums (Ultratop Flanders)	123
Canadian Albums (Billboard)	39
Danish Albums (Hitlisten)	98
US Billboard 200	54
US Top R&B/Hip-Hop Albums (Billboard)	26

2022 year-end chart performance for Scorpion
Chart (2022)	Position
Australian Albums (ARIA)	81
Belgian Albums (Ultratop Flanders)	147
Canadian Albums (Billboard)	48
US Billboard 200	65
US Top R&B/Hip-Hop Albums (Billboard)	32

2023 year-end chart performance for Scorpion
Chart (2023)	Position
Australian Albums (ARIA)	90
Belgian Albums (Ultratop Flanders)	156
Canadian Albums (Billboard)	41
US Billboard 200	47
US Top R&B/Hip-Hop Albums (Billboard)	19

2024 year-end chart performance for Scorpion
Chart (2024)	Position
Australian Hip Hop/R&B Albums (ARIA)	31
US Billboard 200	67
US Top R&B/Hip-Hop Albums (Billboard)	22

2025 year-end chart performance for Scorpion
Chart (2025)	Position
US Billboard 200	111
US Top R&B/Hip-Hop Albums (Billboard)	39

=== Decade-end charts ===
Decade-end chart performance for Scorpion
Chart (2010–2019)	Position
US Billboard 200	20

== Certifications ==
Certifications for Scorpion
Region	Certification	Certified units/sales
Australia (ARIA)	2× Platinum	140,000^{‡}
Belgium (BRMA)	Gold	10,000^{‡}
Brazil (Pro-Música Brasil)	Gold	20,000^{‡}
Canada (Music Canada)	2× Platinum	160,000^{‡}
Denmark (IFPI Danmark)	3× Platinum	60,000^{‡}
France (SNEP)	2× Platinum	200,000^{‡}
Germany (BVMI)	Gold	100,000^{‡}
Italy (FIMI)	2× Platinum	100,000^{‡}
Mexico (AMPROFON)	Platinum	60,000^{‡}
Netherlands (NVPI)	Diamond	93,000^{‡}
New Zealand (RMNZ)	5× Platinum	75,000^{‡}
Poland (ZPAV)	Platinum	20,000^{‡}
Portugal (AFP)	Platinum	7,000^{‡}
Singapore (RIAS)	Platinum	10,000^{*}
Sweden (GLF)	Platinum	30,000^{‡}
United Kingdom (BPI)	2× Platinum	600,000^{‡}
United States (RIAA)	9× Platinum	9,000,000^{‡}
^{*} Sales figures based on certification alone.^{‡} Sales+streaming figures based on certification alone.

== Release history ==
Release dates and formats for Scorpion
Region	Date	Label(s)	Format(s)	Ref.
Various	June 29, 2018	Cash Money; Republic; Young Money	Digital download; streaming	
Various	July 13, 2018	Cash Money; Republic; Young Money	CD	
Various	July 15, 2018	Cash Money; Republic; Young Money	Vinyl	
Japan	August 22, 2018	Universal Music Japan	CD	
