= Don't Matter to Me =

Single by Drake and Michael Jackson

from the album Scorpion
- Released: July 6, 2018
- Recorded: 1980 (Jackson's session); 2018 (official single)
- Studio: Paul Anka's Home Studio, Carmel, California (Jackson's vocals); Sandra Gale, Yolo Estate, California (Drake's vocals)
- Genre: R&B • pop
- Length: 4:05
- Label: Young Money; Cash Money; Republic
- Songwriters: Aubrey Graham; Michael Jackson; Paul Anka; Noah Shebib; Anthony Jefferies; Nana Rogues; Negin Djafari
- Producers: 40; Nineteen85

Drake singles chronology
"Bigger Than You" (2018)	"Don't Matter to Me" (2018)	"In My Feelings" (2018)

Michael Jackson singles chronology
"Low" (2018)	"Don't Matter to Me" (2018)	"Diamonds Are Invincible" (2018)

"Don't Matter to Me" is a song by Canadian rapper Drake and American singer-songwriter Michael Jackson, from the former's fifth studio album Scorpion (2018). It was playlisted by BBC Radio 1 on July 6, 2018. With Jackson's vocals being used posthumously, the song was set to be released to US rhythmic radio on July 10, 2018, alongside "In My Feelings". However, its release in the country was cancelled when Republic Records decided to solely push "In My Feelings" to rhythmic and contemporary hit radio stations in the US. Commercially, the song has reached No. 1 in Sweden and Greece as well as the top 10 in Australia, Canada, the Czech Republic, Ireland, the Netherlands, New Zealand, Norway, Portugal, Slovakia, Switzerland, the United Kingdom, and the United States.

Jackson's vocals were taken from part of an unreleased 1980 session between Jackson and Canadian singer-songwriter Paul Anka. The songs "Love Never Felt So Good" and "This Is It" (a.k.a. "I Never Heard") also came from the same session. In 2025, snippets of Paul Anka's 2013 rework began circulating online featuring more unreleased vocals from Michael Jackson.

== Critical reception ==
The song received generally positive reviews from music critics. Brendan Klinkenberg of Rolling Stone said, "[the song] opens like most Drake songs, with gloomy, atmospheric synths and Drake singing sweetly to an ex-lover. Then Jackson comes in; even with some digital quivering added to his vocals, he's unmistakeable. While the "featuring Michael Jackson" billing would feel like an unnecessary flourish in almost any scenario, it's close to earned here." Larry Fitzmaurice of Entertainment Weekly thought "[the song] makes great melodic hay out of a headline-grabbing posthumous Michael Jackson feature." Roisin O'Connor of The Independent deemed it "hauntingly beautiful", however, she felt Jackson's voice "is controversially auto-tuned to the point that it sounds more like one of his biggest imitators, The Weeknd." NME's Luke Morgan Britton described the song as "a clear-cut power move, rather than artistic posthumous collaboration," and considered it as an example of "cases of Drake doing things because he can, rather than because he should." The Hollywood Reporter's Jonny Coleman felt the song "is as unsettling as a Tupac hologram, but ultimately not as offensive. It sounds like a Weeknd B-side but is weird enough to break up some of the exhaustion of listening to [Scorpion] in one sitting." Dean Van Nguyen of The Irish Times said, "Jackson's segment is lovely, his vocal loop floating over the warm ‘n’ woozy orchestration which comes off as a kind of downbeat version of "Liberian Girl". Unfortunately, Drake is the worst thing about the song, his depressed coos sounding formless and without conviction."

== Commercial performance ==
In the United Kingdom, "Don't Matter to Me" debuted at number two on the UK Singles Chart, dated July 12, 2018, behind George Ezra's "Shotgun". It serves as Drake's 15th top-ten song and Michael Jackson's 44th top ten on the chart.

In the United States, the song debuted at number nine on the US Billboard Hot 100, making it Drake's 31st top-ten song and Jackson's 30th top ten on the chart. It stands as Jackson's second posthumous top-ten entry, tying the peak of his duet with Justin Timberlake, "Love Never Felt So Good" (2014).

== Personnel ==
Credits adapted from the album's liner notes and Tidal.

- Noel Cadastre – recording
- 40 – production, recording
- Noel "Gadget" Campbell – mixing
- Harley Arsenault – mixing assistance
- Greg Moffet – mixing assistance
- Ronald Moonoo – mixing assistance
- Michael Jackson – vocals
- Nineteen85 – production

== Charts ==
=== Weekly charts ===
Chart (2018–2019)	Peak position
Australia (ARIA)	3
Austria (Ö3 Austria Top 40)	18
Belgium (Ultratop 50 Flanders)	33
Belgium (Ultratop 50 Wallonia)	37
Canada Hot 100 (Billboard)	4
Canada CHR/Top 40 (Billboard)	50
Czech Republic Singles Digital (ČNS IFPI)	6
Denmark (Tracklisten)	2
Finland (Suomen virallinen lista)	11
France (SNEP)	24
Germany (GfK)	16
Greece International Digital Singles (IFPI)	1
Hungary (Stream Top 40)	6
Ireland (IRMA)	3
Italy (FIMI)	23
Lebanon (Lebanese Top 20)	15
Malaysia (RIM)	7
Netherlands (Dutch Top 40)	13
Netherlands (Single Top 100)	7
New Zealand (Recorded Music NZ)	6
Norway (VG-lista)	4
Portugal (AFP)	2
Scottish Singles Sales (Official Charts)	33
Singapore (RIAS)	6
Slovakia Singles Digital (ČNS IFPI)	4
Spain (PROMUSICAE)	33
Sweden (Sverigetopplistan)	1
Switzerland (Schweizer Hitparade)	5
UK Singles (Official Charts)	2
UK Hip Hop/R&B (Official Charts)	1
US Billboard Hot 100	9
US Hot R&B/Hip-Hop Songs (Billboard)	8
US Pop Airplay (Billboard)	26
US Rhythmic Airplay (Billboard)	15

=== Year-end charts ===
Chart (2018)	Position
Denmark (Tracklisten)	88
Portugal (AFP)	142
Sweden (Sverigetopplistan)	98

Chart (2019)	Position
US Hot R&B Songs (Billboard)	48

== Certifications ==
Region	Certification	Certified units/sales
Australia (ARIA)	2× Platinum	140,000^{‡}
Canada (Music Canada)	Gold	40,000^{‡}
Denmark (IFPI Danmark)	Platinum	90,000^{‡}
France (SNEP)	Gold	100,000^{‡}
Italy (FIMI)	Gold	25,000^{‡}
New Zealand (RMNZ)	Platinum	30,000^{‡}
Portugal (AFP)	Gold	5,000^{‡}
Sweden (GLF)	Platinum	8,000,000^{†}
United Kingdom (BPI)	Platinum	600,000^{‡}
^{‡} Sales+streaming figures based on certification alone.^{†} Streaming-only figures based on certification alone.

== Release history ==
Country	Date	Format	Label(s)	Ref.
United States	October 9, 2018	Contemporary hit radio	Young Money; Cash Money; Republic	
