= Ella Mai discography =

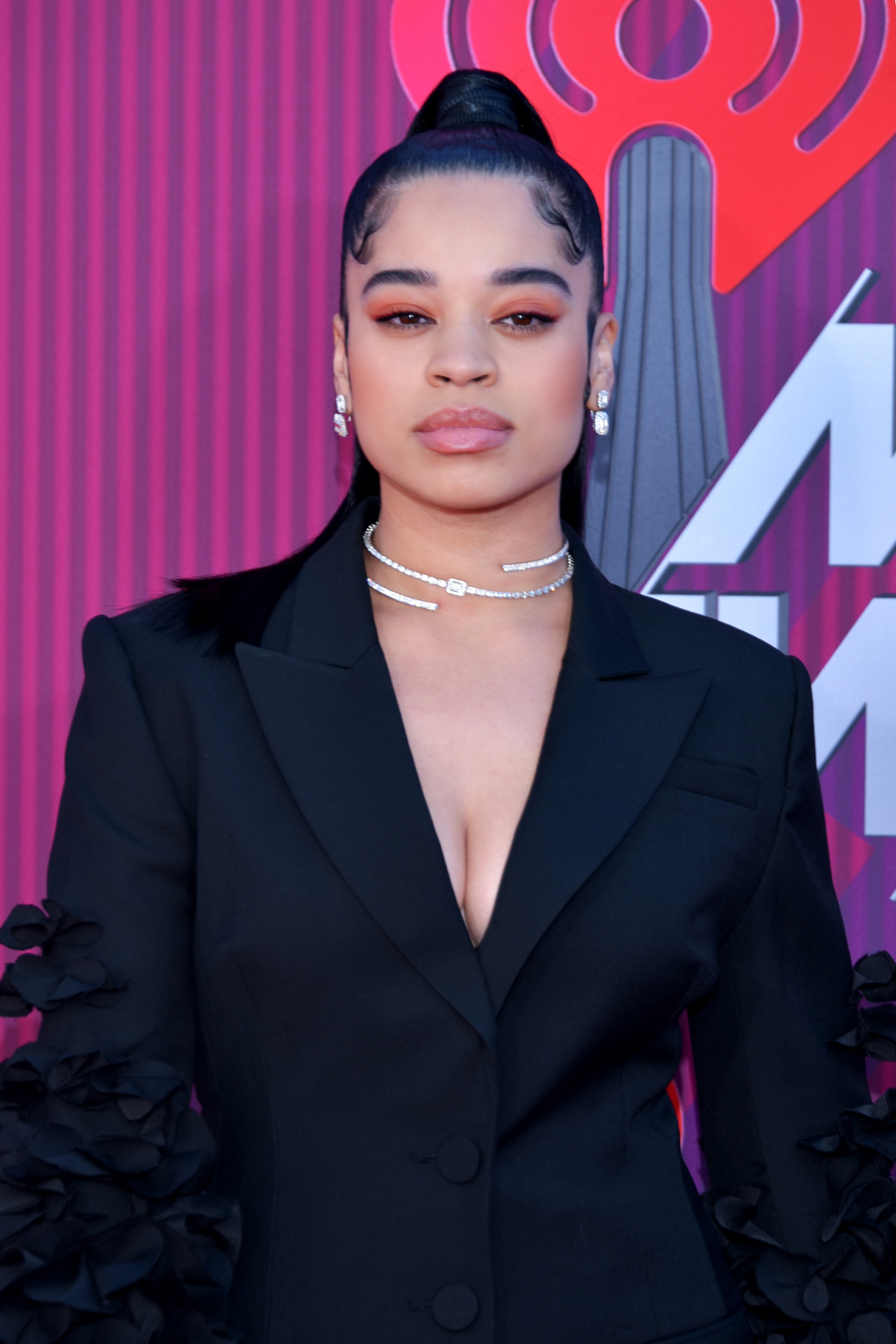
- Mai at the 2019 iHeartRadio Music Awards.
- Studio albums: 3
- EPs: 5

English singer Ella Mai began her career at London's British and Irish Modern Music Institute in 2014, during which she auditioned as part of a trio on the 11th season of the talent series The X Factor. In October 2015, she released her debut four-track solo extended play, Troubled. The EP, along with her performances on social media, attracted the attention of American record producer DJ Mustard, who subsequently signed her to his label, 10 Summers Records, an imprint of Interscope Records, under which she released two additional EPs in 2016, Time and Change.

Her fourth EP, Ready (2017), included the single "Boo'd Up", which became a sleeper hit, peaking at number five on the US Billboard Hot 100, and won the Grammy Award for Best R&B Song. It was followed by "Trip", which reached number 11 and preceded the release of her self-titled debut studio album (2018), which peaked at number five on the US Billboard 200 and at number 18 on the UK Albums Chart. Ella Mai received multiple certifications, including gold in the United Kingdom (100,000 units) and Australia (35,000 units), platinum in Canada (80,000 units), double platinum in New Zealand (30,000 units), and double platinum in the United States (2,000,000 units).

Mai's second studio album, Heart on My Sleeve (2022), released in May 2022, achieved moderate success in the United States but did not chart in the United Kingdom. It debuted at number 15 on the Billboard 200 and number two on the Top R&B Albums chart, earning 20,000 album-equivalent units in its first week, and produced the R&B top ten hits "Not Another Love Song" and "DFMU". In November 2024, following the birth of her son, her first child with basketball player Jayson Tatum, she issued 3, her fifth extended play, as a surprise project to commemorate her 30th birthday. Lead single "Little Things" became another top ten hit on the R&B charts for Mai, reaching gold status in New Zealand, and served as a precursor to her third studio album, Do You Still Love Me?, which was released in February 2026.

== Studio albums ==
List of studio albums, with selected details, chart positions and certifications
Title	Details	Peak chart positions										Certifications
Title	Details	UK	UK R&B	AUS	CAN	IRE	NLD	NZ	US	US R&B /HH	US R&B	Certifications
Ella Mai	Released: 12 October 2018; Label: 10 Summers, Interscope; Formats: CD, LP, digital download, streaming	18	3	19	16	55	31	7	5	4	1	BPI: Gold; ARIA: Gold; MC: Platinum; RIAA: 2× Platinum; RMNZ: 3× Platinum
Heart on My Sleeve	Released: 6 May 2022 (Note: Re-released digitally on 2 February 2023 with three bonus tracks.); Label: 10 Summers, Interscope; Formats: CD, LP, digital download, streaming	— (Note: Heart on My Sleeve did not enter the UK Albums Chart, but peaked at number 55 on the UK Album Downloads Chart.)	13	—	—	—	—	—	15	9	2	
Do You Still Love Me?	Released: 6 February 2026; Label: 10 Summers, Interscope; Formats: CD, LP, digital download, streaming	— (Note: Do You Still Love Me did not enter the UK Albums Chart, but peaked at number 66 on the UK Album Downloads Chart.)	—	—	—	—	—	—	44	14	5	
"—" denotes a recording that did not chart or was not released in that territory.

== Extended plays ==
List of extended plays, with selected details and chart positions
Title	Details	Peak chart positions				
Title	Details	CAN	US	US Heat.	US R&B /HH	US R&B
Troubled	Released: 15 January 2015; Label: Self-released; Format: Streaming (SoundCloud exclusive)	—	—	—	—	—
Time	Released: 15 February 2016; Label: 10 Summers; Formats: LP, digital download, streaming	—	—	—	—	—
Change	Released: 18 November 2016; Label: 10 Summers; Formats: LP, digital download, streaming	—	—	8	38	20
Ready	Released: 22 February 2017; Label: 10 Summers; Formats: LP, digital download, streaming	86	29	25	17	3
3	Released: 3 November 2024; Label: 10 Summers, Interscope; Formats: LP, digital download, streaming	—	—	—	—	—
"—" denotes a recording that did not chart or was not released in that territory.

== Singles ==
=== As lead artist ===
List of singles as lead artist, with year released, selected chart positions, certifications, and associated album
Title	Year	Peak chart positions										Certifications	Album
Title	Year	UK	UK R&B	AUS	CAN	NZ	US	US R&B /HH	US R&B/HH Airplay	US R&B	US Adult R&B	Certifications	Album
"She Don't" (featuring Ty Dolla Sign) (Note: "She Don't" also appears on the Japanese edition of Heart on My Sleeve.)	2016	—	—	—	—	—	—	—	—	—	—	BPI: Silver; MC: Platinum; RIAA: Gold; RMNZ: 2× Platinum	Time
"10,000 Hours"	2017	—	—	—	—	—	—	—	—	—	—	RIAA: Platinum	Change
"Lay Up"	2017	—	—	—	—	—	—	—	—	—	—		Change
"Naked"	2017	—	—	—	—	—	—	—	—	17	—	BPI: Silver; ARIA: Platinum; MC: Platinum; RIAA: 2× Platinum; RMNZ: Platinum	Ella Mai (Note: "Naked" only appears on the Target, Japanese and digital editions of Ella Mai.)
"Boo'd Up" (Solo or featuring Nicki Minaj and Quavo)	2018	52	34	46	43	8	5	4	1	1	1	BPI: Platinum; ARIA: 3× Platinum; MC: 3× Platinum; RIAA: 8× Platinum; RMNZ: 4× Platinum	Ready and Ella Mai
"Trip"	2018	47	26	77	78	22	11	6	1	1	1	BPI: Platinum; ARIA: 3× Platinum; MC: 3× Platinum; RIAA: 6× Platinum; RMNZ: 4× Platinum	Ella Mai
"Shot Clock"	2018	—	—	—	—	— (Note: "Shot Clock" did not enter the Aotearoa Top 40 Singles chart, but peaked at number 26 on the Aotearoa Hot 40 Singles chart.)	62	27	5	3	—	ARIA: Gold; MC: Gold; RIAA: 2× Platinum; RMNZ: Platinum	Ella Mai
"Not Another Love Song"	2020	—	—	—	—	— (Note: "Not Another Love Song" did not enter the Aotearoa Top 40 Singles chart, but peaked at number 36 on the Aotearoa Hot 40 Singles chart.)	— (Note: "Not Another Love Song" did not enter the Billboard Hot 100, but peaked at number 2 on the Bubbling Under Hot 100 chart.)	37	12	9	2	RIAA: Platinum	Heart on My Sleeve
"DFMU"	2022	—	—	—	—	— (Note: "DFMU" did not enter the Aotearoa Top 40 Singles chart, but peaked at number 26 on the Aotearoa Hot 40 Singles chart.)	85	22	5	3	1	RIAA: Platinum	Heart on My Sleeve
"How" (featuring Roddy Ricch)	2022	—	—	—	—	— (Note: "How" did not enter the Aotearoa Top 40 Singles chart, but peaked at number 33 on the Aotearoa Hot 40 Singles chart.)	—	—	22	14	—	RIAA: Gold	Heart on My Sleeve
"Keeps on Fallin'" (with Babyface)	2022	—	—	—	—	— (Note: "Keeps on Fallin'" did not enter the Aotearoa Top 40 Singles chart, but peaked at number 37 on the Aotearoa Hot 40 Singles chart.)	—	— (Note: "Keeps on Fallin'" did not enter the Hot R&B/Hip-Hop Songs chart, but peaked at number 19 on the R&B/Hip-Hop Digital Song Sales chart.)	14	21	2		Girls Night Out
"This Is" (Note: "This Is" only appears on the deluxe edition of Heart on My Sleeve.)	2023	—	—	—	—	—	— (Note: "This Is" did not enter the Billboard Hot 100, but peaked at number 25 on the Bubbling Under Hot 100 chart.)	42	13	10	—	RIAA: Gold	Heart on My Sleeve
"Little Things"	2024	—	—	—	—	— (Note: "Little Things" did not enter the Aotearoa Top 40 Singles chart, but peaked at number 11 on the Aotearoa Hot 40 Singles chart.)	81	22	16	7	19	RMNZ: Gold	3 and Do You Still Love Me?
"Tell Her"	2025	—	—	—	—	— (Note: "Tell Her" did not enter the Aotearoa Top 40 Singles chart, but peaked at number 18 on the Aotearoa Hot 40 Singles chart.)	—	33	13	9	27		Do You Still Love Me?
"100"	2026	—	—	—	—	—	—	—	13	12	30		Do You Still Love Me?
"Might Just"	2026	—	—	—	—	— (Note: "Might Just" did not enter the NZ Top 40 Singles Chart, but peaked at number 20 on the NZ Hot Singles Chart.)	—	—	46	13	—		Do You Still Love Me?
"—" denotes a recording that did not chart or was not released in that territory.

=== As featured artist ===
List of singles as featured artist, with year released, selected chart positions, certifications, and associated album
Title	Year	Peak chart positions								Certifications	Album
Title	Year	UK	UK R&B	NZ Hot	US	US R&B /HH	US R&B/HH Airplay	US R&B	US Adult R&B	Certifications	Album
"24/7" (Meek Mill featuring Ella Mai)	2018	66	22	21	54	25	3	—	—	BPI: Silver; RIAA: Platinum; RMNZ: Gold	Championships
"What You Did" (Mahalia featuring Ella Mai)	2019	90	—	29	— (Note: "What You Did" did not enter the Billboard Hot 100, but peaked at number 7 on the Bubbling Under Hot 100 chart.)	—	13	15	6	BPI: Silver; MC: Gold; RMNZ: Platinum	Love and Compromise
"Don't Waste My Time" (Usher featuring Ella Mai)	2019	—	—	19	— (Note: "Don't Waste My Time" did not enter the Billboard Hot 100, but peaked at number 7 on the Bubbling Under Hot 100 chart.)	— (Note: "Don't Waste My Time" did not enter the Hot R&B/Hip-Hop Songs chart, but peaked at number 6 on the R&B/Hip-Hop Digital Song Sales chart.)	12	12	1	RIAA: Gold	Non-album single
"Jealous" (Kiana Ledé featuring Ella Mai)	2023	—	—	33	—	—	—	—	—		Grudges
"—" denotes a recording that did not chart or was not released in that territory.

=== Promotional singles ===
List of promotional singles, with year released, selected chart positions, certifications, and associated album
Title	Year	Peak chart positions								Certifications	Album
Title	Year	UK	AUS	CAN	NLD	NZ	US Bub.	US R&B /HH Dig.	US R&B	Certifications	Album
"Anymore"	2017	—	—	—	—	—	—	—	—	RIAA: Gold	Ready
"Whatchamacallit" (featuring Chris Brown)	2018	84	66	—	—	21	3	20	7	BPI: Silver; ARIA: Platinum; MC: Gold; RIAA: Platinum; RMNZ: 2× Platinum	Ella Mai
"Put It All on Me" (Ed Sheeran featuring Ella Mai)	2019	—	48	71	91	—	22	—	—	BPI: Silver; MC: Gold; RMNZ: Gold	No.6 Collaborations Project
"Leave You Alone"	2022	—	—	—	—	— (Note: "Leave You Alone" did not enter the Aotearoa Top 40 Singles chart, but peaked at number 39 on the Aotearoa Hot 40 Singles chart.)	—	—	22		Heart on My Sleeve
"One Bad Decision" (Mustard featuring Ella Mai and Roddy Ricch)	2024	—	—	—	—	—	—	—	16		Faith of a Mustard Seed
"—" denotes a recording that did not chart or was not released in that territory.

== Other charted and certified songs ==
List of other charted and certified songs, with year released and associated album
Title	Year	Peak chart positions				Certifications	Album
Title	Year	NZ Hot	US Bub.	US R&B /HH Dig.	US R&B	Certifications	Album
"My Way"	2017	—	—	—	—	ARIA: Gold	Ready
"Good Bad"	2018	—	—	—	18		Ella Mai
"Sauce"	2018	20	—	—	23	RMNZ: Gold	Ella Mai
"Everything" (featuring John Legend)	2018	23	—	—	14	RIAA: Gold	Ella Mai
"Gut Feeling" (featuring H.E.R.)	2018	31	21	—	11	RIAA: Gold	Ella Mai
"Close"	2018	—	—	—	—	RIAA: Gold	Ella Mai
"Trying"	2022	—	—	—	23		Heart on My Sleeve
"Didn't Say" (featuring Latto)	2022	—	—	—	24		Heart on My Sleeve
"Sex Memories" (Chris Brown featuring Ella Mai)	2022	11	25	—	22		Breezy
"Hearts on Deck"	2024	—	—	5	18		3
"One of These"	2024	9	—	6	15		3
"—" denotes a recording that did not chart.

== Guest appearances ==
List of guest appearances, with year released, other performing artists, and associated albums
Title	Year	Other artist(s)	Album
"10,000 Hours"	2016	Mustard	Cold Summer
"Hit Me Up"	2017	Chip	League of My Own II
"This Christmas"	2017	Mustard	A Very Roc Christmas
"This X-Mas"	2017	Chris Brown	Heartbreak on a Full Moon Deluxe Edition: Cuffing Season – 12 Days of Christmas
"Talk to Me, Pt. II"	2018	Craig David	The Time Is Now (Expanded Edition)
"Tiiied"	2018	JID, 6lack	DiCaprio 2
"Love Me Like That (Champion Love)"	2018	—N/a	Creed II: The Album
"24/7"	2018	Meek Mill	Championships
"Surface"	2019	Mustard, Ty Dolla Sign	Perfect Ten
"Put It All on Me"	2019	Ed Sheeran	No.6 Collaborations Project
"What You Did"	2019	Mahalia	Love and Compromise
"One and Only"	2020	J Hus	Big Conspiracy
"Piece of Me"	2020	Wizkid	Made in Lagos
"IYKYK"	2022	Lil Durk, A Boogie wit da Hoodie	7220 (Deluxe)
"Sex Memories"	2022	Chris Brown	Breezy
"Keeps on Fallin'"	2022	Babyface	Girls Night Out
"Jealous"	2023	Kiana Ledé	Grudges
"All or Nothing"	2023	Queen Naija	After the Butterflies
"One Bad Decision"	2024	Mustard, Roddy Ricch	Faith of a Mustard Seed
