= Whatchamacallit =

Whatchamacallit, a shortened version of "what you may call it", may refer to:

- Whatchamacallit, a placeholder name used for something whose name is unknown
- Whatchamacallit (candy), a candy bar made by The Hershey Company
- Whatchamacallit (album), an album by Brick Layer Cake, or the title track
- "Whatchamacallit", a song from the Pussycat Dolls' album Doll Domination
- "Whatchamacallit", a song by Ella Mai from her 2018 self-titled album
- "Whatchamacallit", a song from Esquivel And His Orchestra's album Exploring New Sounds in Hi-Fi
