= IRL (album) =

Studio album by Mahalia
- Released: 14 July 2023
- Genre: R&B
- Length: 44:33
- Label: Warner Music
- Producers: Hart; Grades; JD Reid; Raye; Spencer Stewart; TheElements

Mahalia chronology
Love and Compromise (2019)	IRL (2023)

Singles from IRL
- 1. "Letter to Ur Ex" Released: 22 February 2022; 2. "Bag Of You" Released: 11 November 2022; 3. "Terms and Conditions" Released: 5 April 2023; 4. "Cheat" Released: 8 June 2023; 5. "Ready" Released: 7 July 2023

IRL (initialism for In Real Life) is the second studio album by British singer-songwriter Mahalia. The album was released on 14 July 2023 through Warner Music. The album was inspired by the singer's "traumatic breakup" and her visits to "therapy". In support of the album, Mahalia embarked on a tour of the United Kingdom, Europe, North America and Australia, commencing in October 2023 in Leeds and concluding in Brisbane, Australia on 8 May 2024.

== Critical reception ==
Professional ratings
Aggregate scores
Source	Rating
AnyDecentMusic?	7.2/10
Metacritic	80/100
Review scores
Source	Rating
DIY	4.5/5 stars
The Line of Best Fit	7/10
NME	4/5 stars
The Skinny	3/5 stars

IRL received a score of 80 out of 100 on review aggregator Metacritic based on six critics' reviews, indicating "generally favorable" reception. Aggregator AnyDecentMusic? gave it 7.2 out of 10, based on their assessment of the critical consensus. Elle Barton of DIY called the album a "delight", writing that it strikes "a perfect balance between familiarity and unpredictability, immediate choruses coexisting with a relaxed, breezy sound". NME's Erica Campbell described the album as "bold, vulnerable, classic R&B", with IRL "reflect[ing] a young woman fully becoming herself, not just confidently throwing her hands up but boldly letting her guard down too".

Red Dziri of The Line of Best Fit wrote that "Mahalia is not casting as wide a net as she did in her career-defining debut" and "if IRL is not as consistent as her previous output, this new album still cements Mahalia as a major R&B/Soul fixture both nationally and abroad". Lucy Fitzgerald, reviewing the album for The Skinny, found it to be "satiny and consistent, [but] sonically and lyrically you're eager for some bigger swings. [...] IRL is like a path reflecting dappled sunlight: we can see patches of brightness but its full light is obscured".

== Track listing ==
IRL track listing
No.	Title	Writer(s)	Producer(s)	Length
1.	"Ready"	Mahalia Burkmar; Benjamin Hart; Max Pope; Jordan Reid	Hart; JD Reid; Cameron Gower Poole^{[v]}	3:01
2.	"In My Bag"	Burkmar; Abby-Lynn Keen; Paul Goller; Keven Wolfsohn	TheElements; Poole^{[v]}	3:49
3.	"Terms and Conditions"	Burkmar; Goller; Rachel Keen; Wolfsohn	Raye; TheElements; Poole^{[v]}	3:29
4.	"In My Head" (featuring Joyce Wrice)	Burkmar; Hart; Pope; Reid; Anthony Watts; Joyce Wrice	JD Reid; Poole^{[v]}	3:30
5.	"Cheat" (featuring JoJo)	Ryan Ashley; Uzoechi Emenike; Joanna Levesque; Spencer Stewart	JD Reid; Stewart; TommyD^{[s]}; Poole^{[v]}; MNEK^{[v]}	3:22
6.	"November" (featuring Stormzy)	Burkmar; Hart; Michael Owuo Jr.; Pope; Reid	Hart; JD Reid; Poole^{[v]}	3:34
7.	"Hey Stranger"	Burkmar; Pope; Reid	JD Reid; Poole^{[v]}	2:43
8.	"Isn't It Strange?"	Burkmar; Hart; Daniel Traynor	Grades; JD Reid^{[a]}; Poole^{[v]}	2:43
9.	"It's Not Me, It's You" (featuring Destin Conrad)	Burkmar; Destin Conrad; Hart; Bernard Kawka; Pope; Reid	JD Reid; Poole^{[v]}	3:45
10.	"Wassup" (featuring Kojey Radical)	Burkmar; Kwadwo Amponsah; Roger Ball; Samuel Barnes; John Davis; Malcolm Duncan; James Essien; Steve Ferrone; Alan Gorrie; Owen McIntyre; Ali Jones-Muhammad; Dwight Myers; Jean-Claude Olivier; Reid; Minnie Riperton; Terrie Robinson; Richard Rudolph; Hamish Stuart; Malik Taylor; Leon Ware	JD Reid; Poole^{[v]}	3:46
11.	"Lose Lose"	Burkmar; Hart; Pope; Reid	JD Reid; Poole^{[v]}	3:24
12.	"Goodbyes"	Burkmar; Hart; Pope; Reid	JD Reid; Poole^{[v]}	3:57
13.	"IRL"	Burkmar; Hart; Pope; Reid	JD Reid; Poole^{[v]}	3:30
Total length:				44:33

IRL (Deluxe) track listing
No.	Title	Length
14.	"Slowly"	3:08
15.	"Mani Pedi"	3:11
16.	"Bag of You"	3:18
17.	"Terms and Conditions (Live) - Vevo Studio Performance"	3:37
18.	"Letter to Ur Ex"	2:15
19.	"Plastic Plants"	3:20
Total length:		63:22

Notes

- ^{^[a]} signifies an additional producer.
- ^{^{v]} signifies a vocal producer.
- ^{^[s]} signifies a strings producer.

== Personnel ==
Musicians

- Mahalia – vocals
- JD Reid – keyboards, programming (1, 4–13); drums (1, 4–10, 12, 13), additional vocals (5, 6, 9–11, 13)
- Max Pope – bass guitar (1, 9, 13), guitar (1, 4–7, 9, 11–13)
- Benjamin Stefan Hart – backing vocals (1, 6), additional vocals (9)
- Abby-Lynn Keen – backing vocals (2)
- TheElements – backing vocals (2), bass guitar (2, 3), drums (2, 3), guitar (2), keyboards (2, 3), programming (2, 3), strings (3)
- Raye – backing vocals (3)
- James McMillan – keyboards (3)
- Joyce Wrice – vocals (4)
- Rosie Danvers – string arrangement (5)
- Spencer Stewart – string arrangement, programming, synthesizer (5)
- Wired Strings (Note: Wired Strings consists of cellist Rosie Danvers, violists Bryony Mycroft and Meghan Cassidy, and violinists Ellie Stanford, Hayley Pomfrett, Jenny Sacha, Miles Brett, Patrick Kiernan, Sally Jackson, and Stephen Morris.) – string orchestra (5)
- JoJo – vocals (5)
- Lea Vivyen – piano (6, 13)
- Stormzy – vocals (6)
- Daniel Traynor – keyboards, programming, synthesizer (8)
- Destin Conrad – vocals (9)
- James Essien – additional vocals (10)
- Kojey Radical – vocals (10)
- Cameron Dawson – bass guitar (11)

Technical

- Stuart Hawkes – mastering
- Geoff Swan – mixing
- JD Reid – engineering (1, 4–12)
- TheElements – engineering (2, 3)
- Matt Barnes – engineering (3), vocal engineering (3, 4)
- Spencer Stewart – engineering (5)
- Grades – engineering (8)
- Alex Robinson – vocal engineering (2)
- Isabel Gracefield – string engineering (5)
- James Kirk – additional vocal engineering (5)
- Carlos Mas – additional vocal engineering (10)
- Max Blue Churchill – vocal engineering assistance (3)
- Max Anstruther – string engineering assistance (5)

== Charts ==
Chart performance for IRL
Chart (2023)	Peak position
Hungarian Physical Albums (MAHASZ)	24
Scottish Albums (Official Charts)	81
UK Albums (Official Charts)	31
UK R&B Albums (Official Charts)	2

== Release history ==
Release dates and formats for IRL
Region	Date	Format(s)	Label	Ref.
Various	14 July 2023	CD; digital download; LP; streaming	Warner Music	
