= Joelle James =

American singer-songwriter

- Born: Murrieta, California, U.S.
- Other name: Vanilla
- Education: Berklee College of Music (BFA)
- Musical career
- Genres: Soul Pop; soul; hip-hop; blue-eyed soul
- Occupation: Singer-songwriter-Producer
- Labels: Artist Live; VnllaFctry; Roc Nation; CBE; Interscope

Joelle James is an American songwriter and singer. She is best known for writing the lyric melody for Ella Mai's 2018 single "Boo'd Up", which was nominated for Song of the Year and won Best R&B Song at the 61st Annual Grammy Awards, and is the longest charting number one R&B/Hip-Hop record for a female artist on the Billboard Hot R&B/Hip-Hop Airplay charts since its inception in 1992.

In 2007, James was a contestant on the sixth season of American Idol, reaching the final cuts before the top 24 when she was eliminated. Afterwards, James was discovered by American singer Chris Brown in 2011, who signed her to his eponymous record label in a joint venture with Interscope Records. James has also written songs for Muni Long, Tamar Braxton, Saweetie, Coi Leray, Justine Skye, Ari Lennox, JoJo and Coco Jones among others.

== Songwriting and Production credits ==
Credits are courtesy of Discogs, Tidal, Apple Music, and AllMusic.

Title	Year	Artist	Album
"All the Way Home"	2013	Tamar Braxton	Love and War
"Bandit"	2015	Justine Skye	Emotionally Unavailable
"Don't Worry"	2015	Justine Skye	Emotionally Unavailable
"I'm Yours" (Featuring Vic Mensa)	2015	Justine Skye	Emotionally Unavailable
"Love O’Clock" (Featuring Phaedra)	2016	Chocolate Droppa	Kevin Hart: What Now? (The Mixtape Presents Chocolate Droppa)
"Boo'd Up"	2017	Ella Mai	Ready (EP) & Ella Mai
"Cliché" (Featuring Ari Lennox & Westside Boogie)	2019	Wale	Wow... That's Crazy
"Gold"	2020	JoJo	Good to Know
"Next Episode"	2020	Angelica Vila	Deception SZN 1
"Don't Say Nothin"	2022	Saweetie	The Single Life
"Handle My Truth"	2022	Saweetie	The Single Life
"The Baddest"	2024	Muni Long	Revenge
"On Sight"	2025	Coco Jones	Why Not More

== Guest appearances ==
List of guest appearances, with other performing artists, showing year released and album name
Title	Year	Other performer(s)	Album
"Leave The Club"	2011	Chris Brown	Boy In Detention (Mixtape)
"4 Seconds"	2015	Chris Brown	Before the Party
"Scream"	2016	Chris Brown	Kevin Hart: What Now? (The Mixtape Presents Chocolate Droppa)
"Good Person"	2017	Bone Thugs-n-Harmony	New Waves
"Messy"	2020	Coi Leray	Now Or Never EP
"Handle My Truth"	2022	Saweetie	The Single Life

== Film/TV Sync Placements ==
Title	Year	Performer(s)	Album/Film
"Love O'Clock" (Written by Joelle James)	2016	Phaedra	The Perfect Match
"Scream" (Written by Joelle James)	2016	Joelle James & Chris Brown	Kevin Hart: What Now? (The Mixtape Presents Chocolate Droppa)
"No Place I'd Rather Be"	2017	Joelle James	Heartbeats
'Beside You" (Written by Joelle James)	2018	Joelle James	Traffik
"Ready But Not Ready" (Written by Joelle James)	2018	Joelle James	Traffik
"Dare You To Love Me" (Written by Joelle James)	2018	Joelle James	Traffik
"Bad For Me" (Written by Joelle James)	2018	Joelle James	Traffik
"Bleeding Machines"	2018	Joelle James	Traffik
"One Day At A Time" (Written by Joelle James)	2018	Joelle James	Traffik
"Love O'Clock" (Written by Joelle James)	2018	Joelle James	Traffik
"Heart Of A Woman" (Written by Joelle James)	2018	Joelle James	Traffik
"Make A Little Room" (Written by Joelle James)	2020	Joelle James	2 Minutes of Fame

== Discography ==
Release Date	Song Title	Project Ttile	Ref
June 1, 2011	"Dear Santa"	Sounds of Christmas	7
Oct 14, 2016	"Scream" feat. Chris Brown, Kevin Hart	What Now? Soundtrack	7
Mar 23, 2018	"No Place I'd Rather Be"	Heartbeats(Original Motion Picture Soundtrack)	7
Oct 8, 2018	"Bleeding Machines" (Brea Closing Scene/End Credit)	Traffik(Music from the Motion Picture)Soundtrack	7
Oct 8, 2018	"Beside You" (Pool Scene)	Traffik(Music from the Motion Picture Soundtrack)	7
Oct 8, 2018	"Ready but Not Ready" (Girl Talk/Bathroom Scene)	Traffik(Music from the Motion Picture Soundtrack)	7
Oct 8, 2018	"Bad for Me" (Club Scene,Pt.2)	Traffik(Music from the Motion Picture)Soundtrack	7
Oct 8, 2018	"Dare You to Love Me" (Opening Credits, Club Scene, Pt.1)	Traffik(Music from the Motion Picture) Soundtrack	7
Nov 20, 2020	"2020 Vision"	2020 Vision/Where In The World(Bundle)	7
Nov 20, 2020	"Where in the World Has Love Gone?"	2020 Vision/Where In The World(Bundle)	7
Apr 23, 2021	"Heart Can't Take It"	Single Release	7
May 21, 2021	"Apply Pressure"	(Single Release) off the iSCREAM Scoop 1 EP	7
Aug 4, 2023	"Been That Girl"	(Single Release) off the iSCREAM Scoop 1 EP	7
Nov 17, 2023	"Tomorrow"	Single release	7
Mar 29, 2024	"Make a Little Room"	Single release	7
May 24, 2024	"Tell Me"	iSCREAM Scoop 1(EP)(Single Release)	7
Jul 24, 2024	"iSCREAM"	iSCREAM Scoop 1(EP)(Single Release)	7
Aug 30, 2024	"Enough"	iSCREAM Scoop 1(EP)	7
Aug 30, 2024	"iSCREAM Scoop 1"	iSCREAM Scoop 1(EP)	7
Dec 12, 2024	"The Sweetest Gift Ever"	(Single Release)	7
Jul 25, 2025	"Love Over Everything"	iSCREAM Scoop 2(EP)(Single Release)	7
Oct 31, 2025	"iSCREAM MiCRO MOViE MUSiC"	iSCREAM MiCRO MOViE(EP)	7
Oct 31, 2025	"Get It Together"	iSCREAM MiCRO MOViE(EP)Soundtrack	7
Oct 31, 2025	"Got Your Back"	iSCREAM MiCRO MOViE(EP)Soundtrack	7
Oct 31, 2025	"Why Did You Go?"	iSCREAM MiCRO MOViE(EP)Soundtrack	7
Oct 31, 2025	"Talking to Myself"	iSCREAM MiCRO MOViE(EP)Soundtrack	7
Oct 31, 2025	"Nothing at All"	iSCREAM MiCRO MOViE(EP)Soundtrack	7
Oct 31, 2025	"Misunderstanding"	iSCREAM MiCRO MOViE(EP)Soundtrack	7
Oct 31, 2025	"Can't Do It Baby"	iSCREAM MiCRO MOViE(EP)Soundtrack	7
Nov 7, 2025	"Kiss Me for Christmas"	Piano Diaries(LP)Single Release w/Toby Gad	7
Feb 6, 2026	"iSCREAM Scoop 2"	iSCREAM Scoop 2(EP)	7
Feb 6, 2026	"iSCREAM'd"	iSCREAM Scoop 2(EP)	7
Feb 6, 2026	"No Temporary Love"	iSCREAM Scoop 2(EP)	7
Feb 6, 2026	"Heartache"	iSCREAM Scoop 2(EP)	7
Feb 6, 2026	"2nd Chances"	iSCREAM Scoop 2(EP)	7
Apr 24, 2026	"Journey"	Single release	7
June 26, 2026	"My Girlies"	Single release	7

== Awards and nominations ==
Year	Ceremony	Award	Result	Ref
2018	Soul Train Awards	The Ashford and Simpson Songwriter's Award (Boo'd Up)	Won	
2019	61st Annual Grammy Awards	Grammy Award for Best R&B Song (Boo'd Up)	Won	
2019	61st Annual Grammy Awards	Grammy Award for Song of the Year (Boo'd Up)	Nominated	
2019	ASCAP Pop Music Awards	Most Performed Pop Songs (Boo'd Up)	Won	
2020	ASCAP Rhythm & Soul Awards	Winning R&B/Hip-Hop Songs (Boo'd Up)	Won	
2022	ASCAP	Women Behind The Music Award	Won	
