= Jeolla dialect =

Dialect of the Korean language

Jeolla
- Chŏlla
- 전라도 방언
- Native to: South Korea
- Region: Honam
- Language family: Koreanic: Korean; Southern; Jeolla
- Dialects: Northern Jeolla; Southern Jeolla

Language codes
- ISO 639-3: –
- Glottolog: chol1278

- Jeolla dialect
- Hangul: 전라도 방언
- Hanja: 全羅道方言
- RR: Jeolla-do bangeon
- MR: Chŏlla-do pangŏn

The Jeolla dialect of the Korean language, also known as Southwestern Korean, is spoken in the Jeolla (Honam) region of South Korea, including the metropolitan city of Gwangju. This area was known as Jeolla Province during the Joseon era. However, it is believed that the dialect dates to the Baekje kingdom with Chungcheong Dialect. Like the Chungcheong dialect, the Jeolla dialect is considered non-standard. Pansori texts are written in the Jeolla dialect.

== Grammar ==
=== Verb endings ===
In place of the usual -seumnida (습니다 [sɯmnida]) or -seyo (세요 [sejo]) endings, a southern Jeolla person will use -rau (라우 [ɾau]) or -jirau (지라우 [tɕiɾau]) appended to the verb.

For a causal verb ending, expressed in standard language with a -nikka (니까 [nik͈a]) ending, Jeolla people use -ngkkei (응게 [ŋk͈ei]), so the past tense of the verb "did" ("because someone did it"), haesseunikka (했읍니까 [hɛs͈ɯnik͈a]), becomes haesseungkke (했승게 [hɛs͈ɯŋk͈e]). A similar sound is used for the quotative ending, "somebody said ...". The usual verb endings are -dago (다고 [taɡo]) and -rago (라고 [ɾaɡo]). Jeolla dialect prefers -dangkke (당게 [taŋk͈e]).

Jeolla dialect speakers have a tendency to end their sentences with -ing, (잉) especially when asking a favor. This can be compared to the word "eh", as used by some Canadians.

== Tone ==
=== Pitch and intonations ===
There are two major accentual patterns in the Southern Jeolla dialect: low-high-low and high-high-low. The use between the two is determined by a phrase's initial segment. If it has a spread or constricted laryngeal feature, the high-high-low pattern would be used while the low-high-low pattern characterizes all other phrases. These laryngeal features produce aspirated consonants (denoted with an apostrophe) and its use in determining accent patterns can be seen in onomatopoeia.

For example, panchak (반짝) meaning "twinkle" can be accented as so:

L-H-L: panc' akpanc'ak "twinkle twinkle"

H-H-L: p'anc'akp'anc'ak "much more twinkling than usual"

In Gwangju, studies have concluded that there are three major accentual patterns:

- The first is when the high accent appears only in the initial syllable. This accentual pattern is generally characterized by an initial long vowel syllable. For example, ha:n.kuk (한국) "Korea" follows this H-L pattern.
- The second pattern consists of two initial high syllables and it pertains to words with a tense, aspirated initial consonant. Words that follow this H-H pattern include t^{h}o.k'i (토끼) "rabbit" and t'ak.t'a.ku.ri (딱따구리) "woodpecker."
- The third pattern, L-H, occurs when only the second syllable has a high accent and it applies to all other words such as ka.ɯr (가을) "autumn" and min.tɯr.re (민들레) "dandelion"

== Pronunciation ==
=== Vowel transformations ===
Regarding pronunciation differences, there is often a tendency to pronounce only the second vowel in a diphthong. For example, the verb ending that indicates "since," -neundae, becomes -neundi (는디). The name of the large city of Gwangju (광주) becomes Gangju (강주), and the verb 'to not have, to be absent', eopda 없다, becomes very close to upda (웂다).

Other instances of vowel transformation called umlauting occurs in the Jeolla dialect. The word "caught" is "japhida" (잡히다) in standard Korean, yet in the Jeolla dialect it is pronounced "jaephida" (잽히다). Because of the "i"(ㅣ) vowel following it, the "a" (ㅏ) vowel turns into an "ae" (ㅐ). This transformation occurs in several other words:

- RABBIT: toekki (퇴끼) rather than tokki (토끼)
- MEAT: goegi (괴기) rather than gogi (고기)

The standard "o" sound changes into "oe" due to the following "i" vowel.

=== Short and long vowels ===
The Southern Jeolla dialect, unlike several other Korean dialects, has distinctions between long and short vowel sounds. There is a "vowel shortening rule" where a word-initial syllable becomes short when the word occurs non-initially in a compound such as saaram (사람) "a man" of nuuns' aram (눈사람) "a snowman" or when the word is placed in certain non-initial positions such as:

- i' (이) "this" + saram (사람) "a man" becomes i saram (이 사람) "this man"

Short vowel sounds can also be replaced by long vowels causing a greater ‘dragging’ emphasis on vowels in the Jeolla dialect than standard Korean. The tendency is for "i" sounds (ㅣ) to be pronounced as "eu" (ㅡ), as in the word "lie," or geojitmal (거짓말), which is pronounced as geu~jitmal (그짓말). In addition, "e" (ㅔ) is pronounced as "i" (ㅣ) instead as it is in the word "pillow" or baege (배게), which is pronounced as bi~ge (비개).

== Geographical subdivisions ==
In addition to the north and south division, the Jeolla dialect varies between the eastern and western parts as well. Eastern dialects characterize localities such as Muju (무주), Jinan (진안), Jangsu (장수), Imsil (임실), Namwon (남원), and Sunchang (순창) while western dialects pertain to Okgu (옥구), Iksan (익산), Wanju (완주), Gimje (김제), Buan (부안), Jeongeup (정읍), and Gochang (고창).

== Distinct phrases ==
The most notable word is geosigi (거시기), which is used as a placeholder name or a euphemism for embarrassing words, similar to the English "whatcha-ma-call-it." Other specific phrases include exclamations used to express surprise or shock, such as Wamma! (왐마) and Omae! (오매).

== Perceptions of the Jeolla dialect ==
The general impression surrounding the Jeolla dialect include strong accents and fast speech. In a 2015 survey taken by 488 Gyeongsang dialect speakers, 69% associated the Jeolla dialect with negative personality labels such as "unpleasant," "rough," "scary," and "sarcastic" whereas 31% associated positive personality labels such as "humorous," "cute," and "macho." A 2013 research suggests that Seoul residents also perceive the Jeolla speech negatively, however the Gyeongsang speakers responded positively to the Jeolla dialect. Jeolla speakers demonstrated a "high degree of linguistic security" in response to their own dialect.
