= Do You Still Love Me? (album) =

Studio album by Ella Mai
- Released: 6 February 2026
- Genre: R&B
- Length: 45:49
- Labels: 10 Summers; Interscope
- Producer: Mustard

Ella Mai chronology
| Heart on My Sleeve (2022) | Do You Still Love Me? (2026) |

Singles from Do You Still Love Me?
- 1. "Little Things" Released: 3 November 2024; 2. "Tell Her" Released: 29 August 2025; 3. "100" Released: 14 January 2026; 4. "Might Just" Released: 28 July 2026

Do You Still Love Me? is the third studio album by English singer Ella Mai. It was released on 6 February 2026 through 10 Summers and Interscope Records. Serving as the follow-up to her 2022 album Heart on My Sleeve and the 2024 extended play 3, Mai collaborated exclusively with her mentor, producer Mustard, on the project.

== Background ==
In 2022, Mai released her second album Heart on My Sleeve. It debuted at number 15 on the US Billboard 200, number nine on the Top R&B/Hip-Hop Albums and number two on the Top R&B Albums chart, earning 20,000 album-equivalent units in its first week, and produced the R&B top ten hits "Not Another Love Song" and "DFMU." Despite this, it was commercially less successful than her self-titled debut album (2018), which achieved international chart success and received multiple gold and platinum certifications. In November 2024, following the birth of her son, her first child with basketball player Jayson Tatum, she issued 3, her fifth extended play, as a surprise project to commemorate her 30th birthday. Lead single "Little Things" became another top ten hit on the R&B charts for Mai and served as a precursor to her third studio album.

Mai characterized the resulting album Do You Still Love Me? as a work of personal reflection and emotional vulnerability, developed during her pregnancy and postpartum period. Conceptualized as a series of intimate "love letters," the album examines themes of communication and perspective, with a title deliberately open to multiple interpretations. In contrast to her previous projects, which involved collaborations with multiple producers, Mai worked exclusively with her discoverer, Mustard, for the album's production, emphasizing the significance of trust and support in her creative process, and noting that their long-standing professional relationship provided a secure environment in which to realize her artistic vision.

== Critical reception ==
Professional ratings
Review scores
| Source | Rating |
|---|---|
| Clash | 8/10 |
| OndaRock | 5.5/10 |
| Pitichfork | 7.3/10 |
| Shatter the Standards | 3/5 stars |

Clash critic Mapesho Kyakilika characterized Do You Still Love Me? as a warm and intimate continuation of Mai's emotionally grounded approach to contemporary R&B, praising its emphasis on vulnerability, emotional realism, and self-worth, with standout tracks including "100," "Luckiest Man," and the title song, and concluding that it marked one of her strongest vocal performances to date. Tori Hammond, writing for Shatter the Standards, praised the Do You Still Love Me?'s clear, restrained portrayal of loyal love but argued that its emotional consistency flattened over the full album, noting that moments like "Chasing Circles" revealed a greater emotional risk largely absent elsewhere.

HotNewHipHop's Tallie Spencer remarked that the album was "built on warm R&B production and stripped-back instrumentation," allowing Mai space to showcase her strengths, and noted that across its 14 tracks the project foregrounded raw emotion and intimate storytelling while continuing her vulnerability-driven R&B tradition and reflecting her current artistic direction. Nigerian magazine The Lagos Review felt that "with Mustard's signature production providing the backdrop for Mai's signature R&B vocals, Do You Still Love Me? marks a poignant evolution for the artist as she balances newfound maturity with the soulful vulnerability that first catapulted her to global fame."

== Track listing ==
Do You Still Love Me? track listing
| No. | Title | Writer(s) | Producer(s) | Length |
|---|---|---|---|---|
| 1. | "There Goes My Heart" | Ella Howell; Dijon McFarlane; Gabrielle Rodgers; Varren Wade | Mustard | 3:33 |
| 2. | "100" | Howell; McFarlane; Rodgers; Jim Weatherly; Keanu Torres | Mustard; Keanu Beats^{[a]} | 3:54 |
| 3. | "My Mind" | Howell; McFarlane; Rodgers | Mustard | 2:52 |
| 4. | "Somebody's Son" | Howell; McFarlane; Rodgers | Mustard | 3:40 |
| 5. | "Little Things" | Howell; McFarlane; Charles Hinshaw Jr.; Shah Rukh Zaman Khan | Mustard; Khan^{[a]} | 2:52 |
| 6. | "Outside" | Howell; McFarlane; Rodgers | Mustard | 2:53 |
| 7. | "Audio Message" | Howell | | 0:39 |
| 8. | "Luckiest Man" | Howell; McFarlane; Hinshaw | Mustard | 3:55 |
| 9. | "Might Just" | Howell; McFarlane; Rodgers; Wade | Mustard | 3:43 |
| 10. | "Tell Her" | Howell; McFarlane; Hinshaw; Beyoncé Knowles; Fred Jerkins III; Kelly Rowland; LaShawn Daniels; Latavia Roberson; LeToya Luckett; Rodney Jerkins | Mustard; Luca Starz^{[a]} | 3:17 |
| 11. | "Bonus" | Howell; McFarlane; Rodgers; Hinshaw | Mustard | 3:50 |
| 12. | "First Day" | Howell; McFarlane; Rodgers; Hinshaw | Mustard; Lee Major; Sean Momberger | 3:34 |
| 13. | "Chasing Circles" | Howell; McFarlane; Rodgers; Hinshaw; Wade | Mustard | 3:29 |
| 14. | "No Angels" | Howell; McFarlane; Hinshaw; Wade; Kirk Franklin; Nicholas Peterson; Torres | Mustard; Keanu Beats^{[a]}; Nic Nac^{[a]} | 2:52 |
| Total length: | | | | 45:49 |

=== Notes ===
- ^{^[a]} denotes co-producer(s)
- "100" samples from "Neither One of Us (Wants to Be the First to Say Goodbye)" (1972) by Gladys Knight & the Pips.
- "Tell Her" samples from "Say My Name" (1999) by Destiny's Child.

== Personnel ==
Credits adapted from Tidal.

- Ella Mai – vocals
- Ben "Bengineer" Chang – engineering (tracks 1–6, 8–14)
- Gehring Miller – engineering (1–6, 8–14)
- Manny Marroquin – mixing (1–6, 8–14)
- Francesco Di Giovanni – additional mixing (1–6, 8–14)
- Ramiro Fernandez-Seoane – additional mixing (1–6, 8–14)
- Nicolas De Porcel – mastering
- Quintin Gulledge – keyboards (1, 2, 8–10, 12)
- Peter Lee Johnson – violin (1, 2, 10)
- D. Phelps – keyboards (4, 11–13)
- Micha – background vocals (9, 11)

== Charts ==
Chart performance for Do You Still Love Me?
| Chart (2026) | Peak position |
|---|---|
| Australian Hip Hop/R&B Albums (ARIA) | 28 |
| UK Album Downloads (Official Charts) | 66 |
| US Billboard 200 | 44 |
| US Top R&B/Hip-Hop Albums (Billboard) | 14 |
