= Send Them to Coventry =

Mixtape by Pa Salieu
- Released: 13 November 2020
- Genre: British hip-hop
- Length: 38:46
- Label: Warner Music UK
- Producer: Aod; Felix Joseph; Kwes Darko; Jevon; Sillkey; Chucks; Honeywood6; The Fanatix; Wauve; Yussef Dayes

Pa Salieu chronology
| Send Them to Coventry (2020) | Afrikan Alien (2024) |

Singles from Send Them to Coventry
- 1. "Frontline" Released: 2 January 2020; 2. "Betty" Released: 25 May 2020; 3. "My Family" Released: 10 September 2020; 4. "B***K" Released: 20 October 2020; 5. "Block Boy" Released: 29 October 2020; 6. "Energy" Released: 12 November 2020

Send Them to Coventry is the debut mixtape by British rapper Pa Salieu. It was self-released on 13 November 2020 under exclusive licence to Warner Music UK. Production was handled by Aod, Felix Joseph, Kwes Darko, Jevon, Sillkey, Chucks, Honeywood6, The Fanatix, Wauve and Yussef Dayes. It features guest appearances from BackRoad Gee, Boy Boy, Eight9FLY, Lz Dinero, M1llionz, Mahalia, Ni Santora, Stizee and Shakavellie. The work was nominated for the Best Album Ivor Novello Award in 2021.

== Critical reception ==
Professional ratings
Aggregate scores
| Source | Rating |
|---|---|
| Metacritic | 90/100 |
Review scores
| Source | Rating |
| Clash | 9/10 |
| DIY | 4/5 stars |
| Loud and Quiet | 8/10 |
| NME | 4/5 stars |
| Pitchfork | 8.1/10 |
| The Guardian | 4/5 stars |
| The Observer | 4/5 stars |

Send Them to Coventry was met with universal acclaim from music critics. At Metacritic, which assigns a normalized rating out of 100 to reviews from mainstream publications, the mixtape received an average score of 90 based on eight reviews.

Robert Kazandjian of Clash praised the work, saying: "stunning debut mixtape 'Send Them to Coventry'. The 15-track project is a musical kaleidoscope, fusing elements of afro-swing, dancehall, grime, and rap. Sonically, it speaks to the fluidity of Black sounds". Will Pritchard of Pitchfork said: "this is an extraordinarily assured first offering from a young artist capable of surprising at every turn. The result is not so much a foreboding portrait of a forgotten, boom-and-bust city, but an invitation to a place and people unduly ignored—and an introduction to an artist who won't be". Bella Martin of DIY said: "imbued throughout with a fusion of Pa's Gambian heritage, and life growing up in Coventry ("COV, #cityofviolence" introduces "Informa"), it's a varied, confident and cinematic trip through where the performer finds himself". Dhruva Balram of NME said: "seriously brilliant stuff. Send Them to Coventry promises that Salieu is unbelievably gifted with a ceiling nowhere in sight. He carries the entire mixtape with his singular voice oscillating between conventional rap flows, dancehall toasts and ice-cold venomous lyrics". Alexis Petridis of The Guardian found out that the mixtape "sounds like it would have been successful at any time, regardless of extraneous circumstances: it's too fresh and inventive to ignore". Damien Morris of The Observer resumed: "'Frontline' and 'My Family' are among the best singles of the year, and there are three more just as good here".

=== Accolades ===
| Publication | List | Rank | Ref. |
|---|---|---|---|
| Clash | Clash Albums of the Year 2020 | 11 | |
| Crack Magazine | Crack Magazine's Top 50 Albums of 2020 | 47 | |
| Dazed | The 20 Best Albums of 2020 | 1 | |
| Dummy | The 25 Best Albums of 2020 | 1 | |
| Gorilla vs. Bear | Gorilla vs. Bear's Albums of 2020 | 3 | |
| Noisey | The 100 Best Albums of 2020 | 15 | |
| The Quietus | Quietus Albums of the Year 2020 | 9 | |

== Track listing ==
| No. | Title | Writer(s) | Producer(s) | Length |
|---|---|---|---|---|
| 1. | "Block Boy" | Pa Salieu Gaye; Alastair O'Donnell; Felix Joseph | Aod; Felix Joseph; Kwes Darko | 2:18 |
| 2. | "No Warnin'" (featuring Boy Boy) | Gaye; Erron Williams; O'Donnell; Joseph | Aod; Felix Joseph | 3:18 |
| 3. | "Frontline" | Gaye; Jevon Daniel Ellis | Jevon | 3:21 |
| 4. | "Flip, Repeat" | Gaye; Conor Mulcahy; Luke Caleb Honeywood | Chucks; Honeywood6 | 2:40 |
| 5. | "Informa" (featuring M1llionz) | Gaye; Miguel Cunningham; O'Donnell; Joseph; Sillkey | Aod; Felix Joseph; Sillkey | 2:20 |
| 6. | "Over There" | Gaye; Ellis | Jevon | 2:14 |
| 7. | "Betty" | Gaye; O'Donnell; Joseph; David Sylvian; Jon Hassel | Aod; Felix Joseph | 2:17 |
| 8. | "Pile Up" (Interlude) | Gaye; Kwes Darko; Yussef Dayes | Kwes Darko; Yussef Dayes | 1:25 |
| 9. | "More Paper" (featuring Eight9FLY) | Gaye; Emmanuel Isong; O'Donnell; Joseph | Aod; Felix Joseph | 3:03 |
| 10. | "Active" (featuring Ni Santora, Lz Dinero, Stizee and Shakavellie) | Gaye; Ni Santora; Lz Dinero; Stizee; Shakavellie; O'Donnell; Joseph | Aod; Felix Joseph | 3:52 |
| 11. | "T.T.M" | Gaye; O'Donnell; Joseph | Aod; Felix Joseph | 2:55 |
| 12. | "They Don't Know" (Interlude) | Gaye; Robeal Yohannes | Wauve | 1:04 |
| 13. | "My Family" (featuring BackRoad Gee) | Gaye; Adrian Francis; Curtis James; Karl Jairzhino Daniel; Mark Waxkirsh; Sandy Bongwala Bombusa | The Fanatix | 2:40 |
| 14. | "B***K" | Gaye; O'Donnell; Joseph; Darko | Aod; Felix Joseph; Kwes Darko | 2:10 |
| 15. | "Energy" (featuring Mahalia) | Gaye; Mahalia Burkmar; O'Donnell; Joseph; Darko | Aod; Felix Joseph; Kwes Darko; Sillkey | 3:09 |
| Total length: | | | | 38:46 |

== Charts ==
Chart performance for Send Them to Coventry
| Chart (2021) | Peak position |
|---|---|
| UK R&B Albums (OCC) | 14 |
