= Pa Salieu =

British rapper

- Born: Pa Salieu Gaye; 1 July 1997 (age 28); Slough, Berkshire, England
- Origin: Coventry, West Midlands, England
- Genres: British hip hop; afroswing; UK drill
- Occupations: Rapper; singer; songwriter
- Years active: 2018–present
- Label: Warner Records

Pa Salieu Gaye (born 1 July 1997) is an English rapper and singer. He is signed to Warner Records. He gained recognition in January 2020 with the single "Frontline", which was the most-played track of 2020 on BBC Radio 1Xtra. His style blends elements of afrobeats, grime and UK drill. He released his debut mixtape titled Send Them to Coventry on 13 November 2020.

In 2022, Salieu was sentenced to 33 months in prison after being charged with violent disorder. He served 21 months of that sentence and was released in September 2024.

== Early life ==
Pa Salieu was born in Slough, on 1 July 1997, where he spent the early stages of his life. His parents moved to the UK from The Gambia. He was named after his father's eldest brother, Pa Salieu, a police officer who died in his early twenties during a motorcycle accident while on duty. His aunt is a folk singer, and Salieu describes her and Vybz Kartel as major musical influences.

Before his first birthday, his parents sent him back to The Gambia where he lived with his grandmother. There, he spent his formative years living in a household with his elder relatives. He describes his time there as the most important period in his life. At the age of 8, his mother brought him back to England. They moved to Hillfields, a suburb in the North of Coventry.

== Career ==
=== 2018–2021: Career beginnings and Send Them to Coventry ===
Pa started taking his music career seriously when a friend, who encouraged him to make music instead of doing criminal activity, was killed. He started rapping in 2018 under the name Tribal1, he released several videos with other artists in Coventry. His first string of singles, "Never Had" with B.M. and "Say So" were released in July and September of 2018. In February 2019, he released his "Next Up?" Freestyle with Mixtape Madness. That March, he released his BL@CKBOX freestyle.

In 2020, he released his breakout single "Frontline" with a music video released via Mixtape Madness. It has also become the most played track of 2020 on BBC 1Xtra, Reprezent Radio and Rinse FM. Salieu's music has received support from Virgil Abloh, BBC Radio 1's Annie Mac and Tiffany Calver as well as OVO Sound co-founder Oliver El Khatib. Throughout 2020, he collaborated with South London rapper SL on the song "Hit the Block", as well as Meekz, M1llionz and Teeway on "Year of the Real". He also collaborated with Backroad Gee and Ambush for the remix to their track, "Party Popper". In June 2020, Salieu released two tracks – "Betty" and "Bang Out".

In November 2020, he released his debut mixtape Send Them to Coventry, which peaked at number 14 on the UK R&B Albums Chart.

=== 2021–present: Afrikan Rebel, prison and release ===
In January 2021, he was announced as the winner of the BBC Sound of... 2021. On 22 January 2021, he performed "Frontline" on Jimmy Fallon's "The Tonight Show". Pa Salieu has been selected by GQ as one of 11 "new musicians who'll make 2021 better" and he was also on the cover of NME's first issue of 2021, NME 100 edition. In September 2021, he released the EP Afrikan Rebel with features from Tay Iwar, Obongjayar, and Zlatan. In October 2021, Salieu released the single "Bad" with Aitch. In August 2022, he appeared on the song "Blessing Me" by British producer Mura Masa alongside Kali Uchis and Skillibeng. In September 2022, he appeared alongside Swedish rapper Yasin on the song "Magazine".

Following a two-year break due to his incarceration, he returned with the single "Belly" in September 2024. Salieu followed up with the songs "Allergy" and "Epiphany / Crash" in the same month. On 30 October, he released the single "Round & Round". On 5 November 2024 he made his debut on the COLORS show with a premiere of his new song "Dece (Heavy)".

On 10 September 2025, Afrikan Alien was announced as one of 12 nominees for the 2025 Mercury Prize.

== Personal life ==
In October 2019, Salieu was hit by shotgun pellets outside of Ivy House in Coventry. 19 pieces of bullet shrapnel were removed from the back of his head. He made a full recovery in hospital.

== Legal issues ==
In 2015, Salieu was given a suspended sentence for knife possession.

On 1 September 2018, Fidel Glasgow, who was a friend of Salieu and the grandson of musician Neville Staple, was fatally stabbed near a nightclub; Salieu and a group of men chased another man from the scene who was then attacked by the group. Salieu admitted to hitting the victim with a tree branch, and smashing a bottle to defend himself. On 2 December 2022, Salieu was convicted of possessing a bottle as an offensive weapon & violent disorder leading to a sentence of 33 months in prison. After serving 21 months of his sentence, he was released in September 2024.

== Discography ==
=== Mixtapes ===
Title	Details	Peak chart positions
Title	Details	UK R&B
Send Them to Coventry	Released: 13 November 2020; Label: Warner Music UK; Formats: Digital download, streaming, CD	14
Afrikan Alien	Released: 15 November 2024; Label: Warner Music UK; Formats: Digital download, streaming, CD	—

=== Extended plays ===
Title	Details
Afrikan Rebel	Released: 15 September 2021; Label: Warner Music UK; Formats: Digital download, streaming, CD

=== Singles ===
Title	Year	Peak chart positions		Album
Title	Year	UK	SWE	Album
"Frontline"	2020	—	—	Send Them to Coventry
"Betty"	2020	—	—	Send Them to Coventry
"My Family" (featuring BackRoad Gee)	2020	—	—	Send Them to Coventry
"B***K"	2020	—	—	Send Them to Coventry
"Block Boy"	2020	—	—	Send Them to Coventry
"Energy" (featuring Mahalia)	2020	—	—	Send Them to Coventry
"Glidin'" (featuring Slowthai)	2021	78	—	Non-album singles
"Bad" (featuring Aitch)	2021	82	—	Non-album singles
"Magazine" (with Yasin)	2022	—	29	Non-album singles
"Belly"	2024	—	—	Afrikan Alien
"Allergy"	2024	—	—	Afrikan Alien
"Epiphany / Crash (Freestyle)"	2024	—	—	Non-album single
"Round & Round"	2024	—	—	Afrikan Alien
"Dece (Heavy)"	2024	—	—	Afrikan Alien
"King Steps" (with Disclosure)	2024	—	—	TBA
