= Mahalia (singer) =

British singer (born 1998)

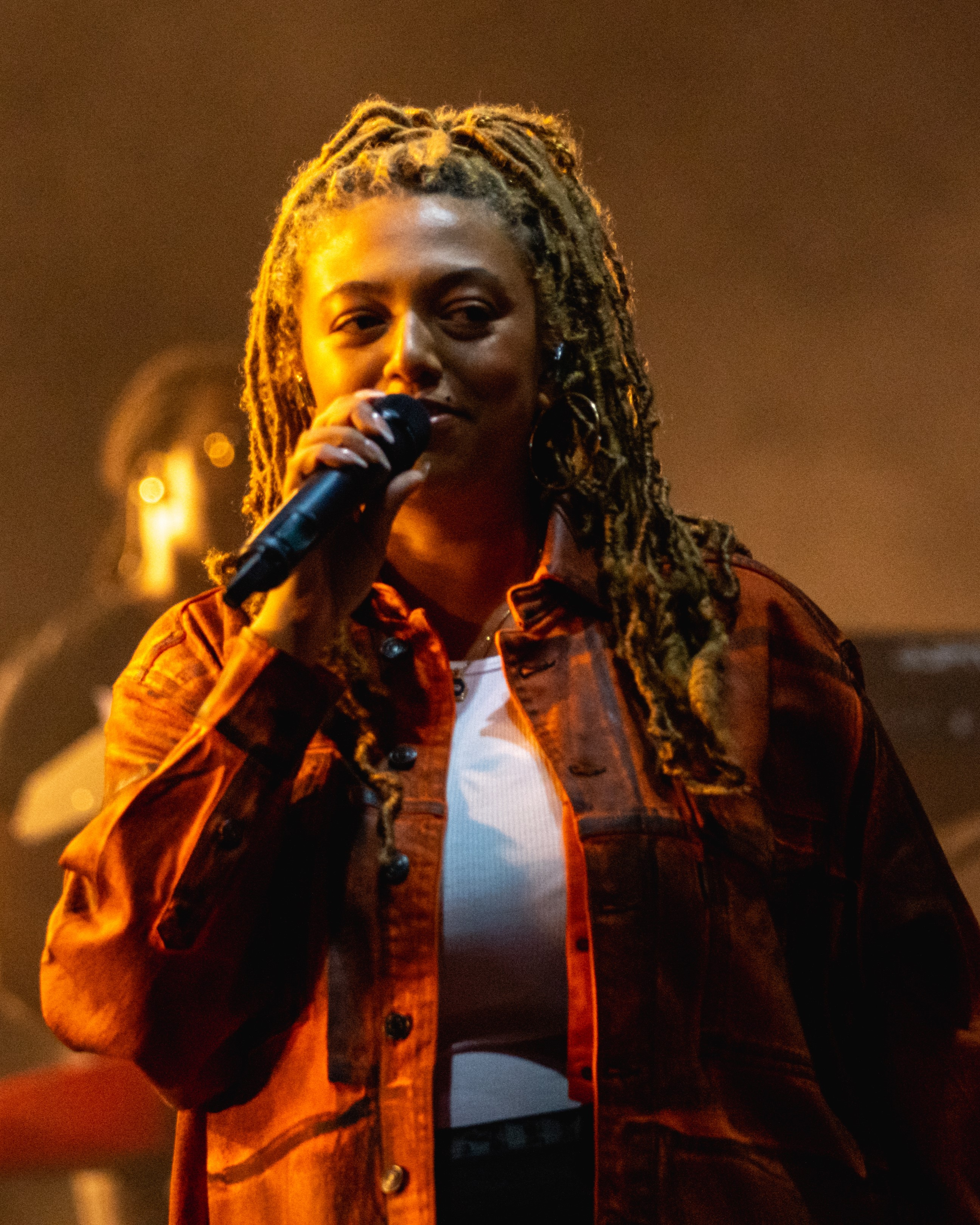
- Mahalia performing at Boardmasters Festival in 2021

Background information
- Born: Mahalia Burkmar; 1 May 1998 (age 28)
- Origin: Syston, Leicestershire, England
- Genres: R&B; neo soul
- Occupations: Singer; songwriter; actress
- Instruments: Vocals; guitar
- Years active: 2015–present
- Labels: Asylum; Warner (former); BMG
- Website: www.mahaliamusic.co.uk

Mahalia Burkmar (born 1 May 1998), known mononymously as Mahalia, is a British singer and songwriter. Mahalia has released several EPs and three albums, Diary of Me (2016), Love and Compromise (2019) and IRL (2023). She also acted in the film Brotherhood (2016). She had her breakthrough in 2017 with her performance of "Sober" for the YouTube channel Colors. In 2018, she was ranked number one on YouTube's Ones to Watch list.

== Life and career ==
Mahalia is from Syston, Charnwood, in Leicestershire. She was born to musician parents. Her father is British-Irish and her mother is Jamaican (Debbion Currie, the first singer of English band Colourbox, in 1982–1983). Mahalia has described the town she grew up in as a predominantly white area with "a lot of racism". She has two brothers, one of whom is Jamaal Burkmar, a dance choreographer and social media influencer.

She attended Roundhill Community College until she signed a record deal at age 13, when she transferred to a performing arts school, Birmingham Ormiston Academy, where she took acting classes. Mahalia further expanded her actor training at Urban Young Actors, Leicester.

As a child, she would often spend her summer breaks at home writing music—she wrote her first song at age eight and signed a deal with Asylum Records at age 13. She performed live for the first time aged "eleven, or maybe 12" at an open mic. She released her debut EP, Head Space, in 2012. Mahalia was later introduced to Ed Sheeran, who she went on to perform as a supporting act for, duetting with him on his song "Gold Rush". She supported Sheeran and Emeli Sandé in their 2014 UK tours. She sang on the title track of UK No. 1 album We the Generation by Rudimental in 2015.

In 2019, Mahalia was featured on BBC Radio 1's Brit List. Her album Love and Compromise was released and marketed as her debut album. The album concept was influenced by an interview with Eartha Kitt, which Mahalia's mother showed her when she was a child. Mahalia won Best Female Act and Best R&B/Soul Act at the 2020 MOBO Awards.

In 2021, she released "Jealous", a collaboration with American rapper Rico Nasty. She was nominated for her first Grammy Award for Best R&B Performance at the 63rd Annual Grammy Awards. Mahalia was included in the 2021 Forbes 30 Under 30 list.

In 2022, Mahalia was among the performers at the 2022 Commonwealth Games in Birmingham. She was also one of the opening acts in the all-female lineup at Adele's British Summer Time concerts in London's Hyde Park.

In 2023, Mahalia released her second studio album, titled IRL. In support of the album, she toured Europe, North America, and Australia.

== Influences ==
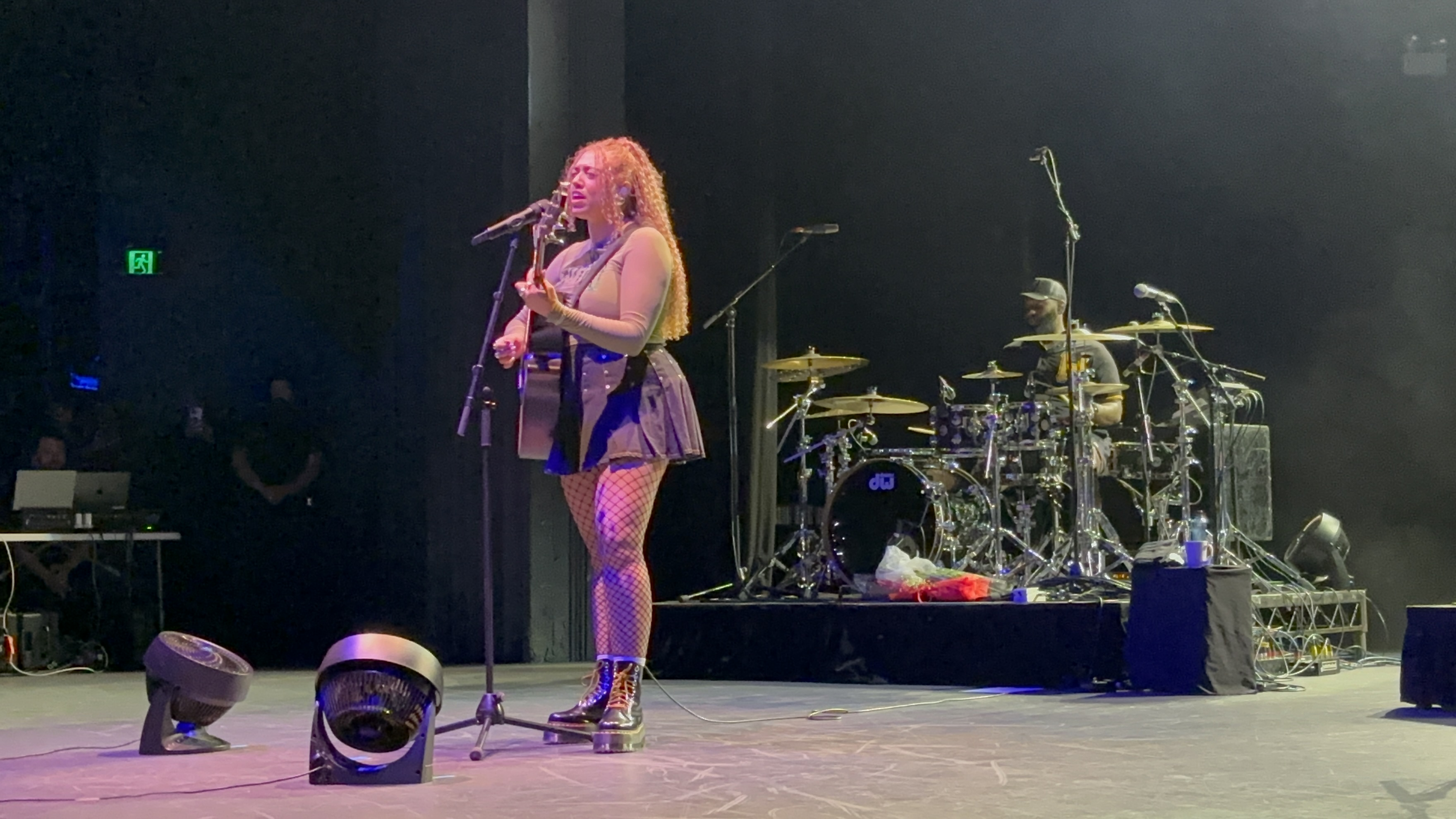
Mahalia performing in Sydney, Australia in May 2024.

Mahalia has listed Corinne Bailey Rae, Erykah Badu, Lauryn Hill, Amy Winehouse, Jill Scott, India Arie, Ed Sheeran, and Kate Nash among her musical influences.

== Discography ==
=== Studio albums ===
List of studio albums, with selected details
Title	Details	Peak chart positions				Certifications
Title	Details	UK	UK R&B	SCO	US Heat.	Certifications
Love and Compromise	Released: 6 September 2019; Label: Asylum; Format: CD, digital download, streaming	28	3	—	23	BPI: Silver
IRL	Released: 14 July 2023; Label: Warner Music UK; Format: CD, digital download, streaming	31	2	81	—	
"—" denotes a recording that did not chart or was not released in that territory.

=== Compilation albums ===
List of compilation albums
Title	Details
Diary of Me	Released: 16 December 2016; Label: Asylum; Format: CD, digital download, streaming

=== Extended plays ===
List of extended plays, with selected details
Title	Details
Head Space	Released: 10 July 2012; Format: Digital download, streaming
Never Change	Released: 11 December 2015; Format: Digital download, streaming
Seasons	Released: 21 September 2018; Format: Digital download, streaming
Isolation Tapes	Released: 1 May 2020; Format: Digital download, streaming
Letter to Ur Ex	Released: 20 May 2022; Format: Digital download, streaming
FML	Released: 9 November 2023; Format: Digital download, streaming
ILY	Released: 16 November 2023; Format: Digital download, streaming
Luvergirl	Release date: 15 August 2025; Label: Warner Music UK; Format: Digital download, streaming

=== Singles ===
List of singles as lead artist, with selected chart positions, showing year released and album name
Title	Year	Peak chart positions								Certifications	Album
Title	Year	UK	UK R&B	BEL (FL) Tip	NZ Hot	US Bub.	US R&B	US R&B/HH Airplay	US Adult R&B	Certifications	Album
"Borrowers"	2015	—	—	—	—	—	—	—	—		Never Change
"Back Up Plan"	2016	—	—	—	—	—	—	—	—		Diary of Me
"17"	2016	—	—	—	—	—	—	—	—		Diary of Me
"Silly Girl"	2016	—	—	—	—	—	—	—	—		Diary of Me
"Mahalia"	2016	—	—	—	—	—	—	—	—		Diary of Me
"Roller Coaster"	2016	—	—	—	—	—	—	—	—		Diary of Me
"I Remember"	2016	—	—	—	—	—	—	—	—		Diary of Me
"Marry Me"	2016	—	—	—	—	—	—	—	—		Diary of Me
"Independence Day"	2016	—	—	—	—	—	—	—	—		Diary of Me
"Begin Again"	2016	—	—	—	—	—	—	—	—		Diary of Me
"Sober"	2017	—	—	—	—	—	—	—	—	BPI: Silver	FML
"Hold On" (featuring Buddy)	2017	—	—	—	—	—	—	—	—		Non-album singles
"No Pressure"	2017	—	—	—	—	—	—	—	—		Non-album singles
"Proud of Me" (featuring Little Simz)	2018	—	—	—	—	—	—	—	—		Non-album singles
"No Reply"	2018	—	—	—	—	—	—	—	—		Non-album singles
"Water" (with Kojey Radical and Swindle)	2018	—	—	—	—	—	—	—	—		Non-album singles
"I Wish I Missed My Ex"	2018	—	—	43	—	—	—	—	—	BPI: Silver; RMNZ: Gold	Love and Compromise
"Surprise Me"	2018	—	—	43	—	—	—	—	—		Seasons
"One Night Only" (featuring Kojey Radical)	2018	—	—	—	—	—	—	—	—		Seasons
"Do Not Disturb"	2019	—	—	3	—	—	—	—	—		Love and Compromise
"Grateful"	2019	—	—	—	—	—	—	—	—		ILY
"Simmer" (featuring Burna Boy)	2019	46	34	32	—	—	—	—	—	BPI: Gold	Love and Compromise
"Square 1"	2019	—	—	—	—	—	—	—	—		Love and Compromise
"What You Did" (featuring Ella Mai)	2019	90	—	—	29	7	15	13	6	BPI: Silver; RMNZ: Platinum	Love and Compromise
"BRB"	2020	—	—	—	—	—	—	—	20		Isolation Tapes
"Jealous" (featuring Rico Nasty)	2021	—	—	—	34	—	—	—	—		Non-album singles
"Whenever You're Ready"	2021	—	—	—	36	—	—	—	17		Non-album singles
"Roadside" (featuring AJ Tracey)	2021	93	—	—	37	—	—	—	—		Non-album singles
"Letter to Ur Ex"	2022	—	—	—	—	—	—	—	—		Letter to Ur Ex and IRL
"Whatever Simon Says"	2022	—	—	—	—	—	—	—	—		Letter to Ur Ex
"In the Club"	2022	—	—	—	31	—	—	—	—		Letter to Ur Ex
"Bag of You"	2022	—	—	—	—	—	—	—	—		IRL
"Terms and Conditions"	2023	—	—	—	—	—	—	—	—		IRL
"Cheat" (featuring JoJo)	2023	—	—	—	—	—	—	—	—		IRL
"Ready"	2023	—	—	—	—	—	—	—	—		IRL
"Pick Up the Pace" (featuring Bayka)	2024	—	—	—	—	—	—	—	—		Luvergirl
"Pressure Points" (featuring Lila Iké)	2025	—	—	—	—	—	—	—	—		Luvergirl
"Different Type of Love" (featuring Masicka)	2025	—	—	—	—	—	—	—	—		Luvergirl
"Instructions"	2025	—	—	—	—	—	—	—	—		Luvergirl
"Pity" (featuring Tanya Stephens)	2025	—	—	—	—	—	—	—	—		Luvergirl
"FCUK" (with H.LLS)	2026	—	—	—	—	—	—	—	—		Non-album single
"The 5 Stages of Heartbreak"	2026	—	—	—	—	—	—	—	—		TBA
"—" denotes a recording that did not chart or was not released in that territory.

=== Guest appearances ===
List of non-single guest appearances, showing year released, other artist(s), and album name
Title	Year	Other artist(s)	Album
"We the Generation"	2015	Rudimental	We the Generation
"Keep It Pushin"	2018	Russ	Zoo
"Low Ride"	2020	Poppy Ajudha	Non-album single
"Energy"	2020	Pa Salieu	Send Them To Coventry
"All I Need"	2020	Jacob Collier, Ty Dolla Sign	Djesse Vol. 3
"Pretty"	2020	col3trane	Non-album single
"No One But You"	2020	Justin Nozuka	Then, Now & Again
"Closer"	2022	RM, Paul Blanco	Indigo
"Five Star Hotels"	2023	Raye	My 21st Century Blues

== Awards and nominations ==
Year	Organization	Award	Work	Result
2018	Brit Awards	Critics' Choice Award	Herself	Nominated
2018	BBC	Sound of 2019	Herself	Included
2018	Metro	Ones To Watch 2019	Herself	Included
2019	MTV Push	Ones To Watch 2019	Herself	Nominated
2019	Soul Train Music Awards	Best New Artist	Herself	Nominated
2019	Brit Awards	Critics' Choice Award	Herself	Nominated
2020	Brit Awards	British Female Solo Artist	Herself	Nominated
2020	NAACP Image Awards	Outstanding New Artist	Herself	Nominated
2021	Grammy Awards	Best R&B Performance	"All I Need" (with Jacob Collier and Ty Dolla Sign)	Nominated
2024	Brit Awards	Best New Artist	Herself	Nominated
2024	Brit Awards	British R&B Act	Herself	Nominated

== Filmography ==
- Brotherhood (Noel Clarke, 2016) – as Thea
