= Kevin Hart: What Now? (The Mixtape Presents Chocolate Droppa) =

Mixtape by Kevin Hart
- Released: October 14, 2016
- Recorded: 2015–16
- Studio: Kevin’s Crib (Chicago, Illinois)
- Genre: Hip hop
- Length: 52:47
- Label: Motown
- Producer: 1500 or Nothin'; America Antagon1st; Clinton Sparks; Cool & Dre; Desmond "DSP" Powell; Eric Kovacs; Ezekiel Lewis; IlladaProducer; J Gramm; J.Oliver; Kent Jones; Metro Boomin; Sir Nolan; Space Primates; Troy Taylor; William Wiik Larsen

Singles from Kevin Hart: What Now? (The Mixtape Presents Chocolate Droppa)
- 1. "Push It on Me" Released: November 11, 2016

Kevin Hart: What Now? (The Mixtape Presents Chocolate Droppa) is the debut mixtape hosted by Chocolate Droppa, the musical alter ego of actor and comedian Kevin Hart. The album was released on October 14, 2016, by Motown Records. Guest appearances include Trey Songz, T.I., Migos, Tink, Big Sean, 2 Chainz, Kent Jones, Lil Yachty, PnB Rock, Nick Jonas, Wale, BJ the Chicago Kid, and Chris Brown, among others.

== Track listing ==
No.	Title	Writer(s)	Producer(s)	Length
1.	"Chocolate Droppa Intro Skit"	Leland Wayne; Kevin Hart	Metro Boomin	1:42
2.	"Baller Alert" (featuring Migos and T.I.)	Kiari Cephus; Clifford Harris; Quavious Marshall; Kirsnick Ball	Lex Luger	4:43
3.	"Light It Up" (Big Sean featuring 2 Chainz)	Noah Beresin; Tauheed Epps; Henry Steinway; Sean Anderson; Earl Taylor	RL Grime; Noah Breakfast	2:48
4.	"Chocolate Droppa Skit (Act 1)"	Wayne; Hart	Metro Boomin	1:53
5.	"All Falls Down" (featuring Tink)	Carlos McSlain; Christopher Brody Brown; Trinity Home	1500 or Nothin'	3:27
6.	"Push It On Me" (with Trey Songz)	Troy Taylor; Ezekiel Lewis; Tremaine Neverson; Jeffery Robinson; Mike Flowers	Ezekiel Lewis; Troy Taylor; J.Oliver	3:52
7.	"Chocolate Droppa Skit (Act 2)"	Wayne; Hart	Metro Boomin	0:19
8.	"Give It Back" (featuring Akon)	Jim Lavigne; William Wiik Larsen; Aliaume Thiam	William Wiik Larsen	3:51
9.	"Stretch Marks" (featuring Kent Jones)	Marcello Antonio Valenzano; Andre Christopher Lyon; Kent Jones; Khaled Khaled; Ray Fraser	iLLa da Producer; Kent Jones; Cool & Dre	3:23
10.	"What Happened To" (featuring Kevin Ross)	Marc Sibley; Frank Brim; Kevin Ross; David Brown; Charles Hinshaw Jr.; Nathan Cunningham	Space Primates	3:34
11.	"All Day" (featuring Lil Yachty and PnB Rock)	Julian Gramma; Rakim Allen; Miles McCollum	J Gramm	3:36
12.	"Scream" (featuring Chris Brown and Joelle James)	Jimmy Jam; Terry Lewis; Christopher Brown; Joelle Marie James; Desmond "DSP" Powell	Desmond "DSP" Powell	3:54
13.	"Saturday Night" (featuring Clinton Sparks and Joey Bandz)	Jason Pounds; Montez Dillard; Justin Lucas; Kamau Georges	Clinton Sparks	3:15
14.	"Sunday Morning" (featuring Nick Jonas)	Nolan Lambroza; Nick Jonas; Simon Wilcox; Dewain Whitmore	Sir Nolan	2:54
15.	"What Now" (featuring BJ the Chicago Kid, Wale, and Chaz French)	Stacy Barthe; Micah Powell; Eric Kovacs; Chaz French; Lyon; Valenzano; Olubowale Victor Akintimethi	Cool & Dre; Eric Kovacs	4:38
16.	"Love O’Clock" (featuring Phaedra)	Eric Johnson; Powell; James	American Antagon1st	3:41
17.	"Chocolate Droppa Outro Skit"	Wayne; Hart	Metro Boomin	1:17
Total length:				52:47
