= Little Things (Ella Mai song) =

2024 single by Ella Mai

Single by Ella Mai

from the EP 3 and the album Do You Still Love Me?
- Released: 3 November 2024
- Genre: R&B
- Length: 2:52
- Label: 10 Summers; Interscope
- Songwriters: Ella Howell; Charles Hinshaw Jr.; Dijon McFarlane
- Producers: Mustard; Gylttryp

Ella Mai singles chronology
"Jealous" (2023)	"Little Things" (2024)	"Tell Her" (2025)

Music video
- "Little Things" on YouTube

"Little Things" is a song by English singer-songwriter Ella Mai from her EP, 3 (2024) and her third studio album, Do You Still Love Me? (2026). It was produced by Mustard and co-produced by Gylttryp.

== Content ==
The song centers on the notion that even small gestures of kindness can convey love and help maintain strong healthy relationships. The lyrics focus on Ella Mai consciously putting effort into a relationship through these actions, such as preparing a bath, a movie to entertain, and breakfast for her partner. Like the other songs from 3, "Little Things" is believed to be addressing her boyfriend, basketball player Jayson Tatum.

== Critics reception ==
Reviewing the album, Kearse Stephen of Pitchfork described the song as an "innocent successor" of Destiny's Child's "Cater 2 U" (2005), pointing out that "where Destiny’s Child depicted small acts of service as intimate foreplay, Mai drops the come-ons and finds pleasure in the favors themselves; [...] a strong current of devotion, but her conviction here is ironclad, her voice clarion rather than yearning".

== Charts ==
=== Weekly charts ===
Weekly chart performance for "Little Things"
Chart (2024–2025)	Peak position
New Zealand Hot Singles (RMNZ)	11
US Billboard Hot 100	81
US Hot R&B/Hip-Hop Songs (Billboard)	22
US Rhythmic Airplay (Billboard)	37

=== Year-end charts ===
Year-end chart performance for "Little Things"
Chart (2025)	Position
US Hot R&B/Hip-Hop Songs (Billboard)	45

== Certifications ==
Certifications for "Little Things"
Region	Certification	Certified units/sales
New Zealand (RMNZ)	Gold	15,000^{‡}
^{‡} Sales+streaming figures based on certification alone.
