= Shot Clock (song) =

2019 single by Ella Mai

Single by Ella Mai

from the album Ella Mai
- Released: 20 November 2018
- Recorded: 2017–18
- Length: 3:21
- Label: 10 Summers; Interscope
- Songwriters: Micah; Aubrey Graham; Dijon McFarlane; Ella Mai; Jahron Brathwaite; Quentin Miller; Benjamin Bush; Stephen Garrett; Timothy Mosley
- Producer: DJ Mustard

Ella Mai singles chronology
"Trip" (2018)	"Shot Clock" (2018)	"24/7" (2019)

Music video
- "Shot Clock" on YouTube

"Shot Clock" is a song by English singer Ella Mai from her eponymous debut studio album. The song peaked at number 62 on the Billboard Hot 100. The song was written by Mai, Micah, Drake, Dijon McFarlane, Jahron Brathwaite, Quentin Miller, Benjamin Bush, Stephen Garrett and Timothy Mosley and features production by DJ Mustard. The song samples Drake's 2015 song "Legend"

== Music video ==
An accompanying music video for the song premiered via Mai's Vevo channel on 17 January 2019.

== Charts ==
=== Weekly charts ===
Chart (2019)	Peak position
US Billboard Hot 100	62
US Hot R&B/Hip-Hop Songs (Billboard)	27
US Rhythmic Airplay (Billboard)	18

=== Year-end charts ===
Chart (2019)	Position
US Hot R&B/Hip-Hop Songs (Billboard)	73

== Certifications ==
Region	Certification	Certified units/sales
Australia (ARIA)	Gold	35,000^{‡}
Brazil (Pro-Música Brasil)	Gold	20,000^{‡}
Canada (Music Canada)	Gold	40,000^{‡}
New Zealand (RMNZ)	Platinum	30,000^{‡}
United States (RIAA)	2× Platinum	2,000,000^{‡}
^{‡} Sales+streaming figures based on certification alone.

== Release history ==
Region	Date	Format	Label	Ref.
United States	29 January 2019	Rhythmic contemporary	Interscope	
