= Boo'd Up =

2018 single by Ella Mai

Single by Ella Mai

from the EP Ready and the album Ella Mai
- Released: 20 February 2018
- Recorded: January 2017
- Genre: R&B
- Length: 4:16 (EP version); 3:59 (album version)
- Label: 10 Summers; Interscope
- Songwriters: Joelle James; Ella Howell; Dijon McFarlane; Larrance Dopson
- Producers: Mustard; Dopson (co.)

Ella Mai singles chronology
"Naked" (2017)	"Boo'd Up" (2018)	"Trip" (2018)

Music video
- "Boo'd Up" on YouTube

"Boo'd Up" is the sleeper hit and debut commercial single by English singer Ella Mai from her third extended play, Ready (2017), and as the eighth single from her debut studio album Ella Mai (2018). Serving as the lead single for the EP, the song peaked at number five on the Billboard Hot 100 in the United States. It was a minor hit in her native UK, peaking at 52 whilst peaking within the top 50 in Australia and Canada. A remix featuring Nicki Minaj and Quavo peaked at number 8 in New Zealand. The song was written by Mai, Joelle James, Dijon "Mustard" McFarlane and Larrance Dopson of 1500 or Nothin', and produced by the latter two. It was nominated for Song of the Year and won Best R&B Song at the 61st Annual Grammy Awards.

== Background and release ==
American singer-songwriter Joelle James first wrote "Boo'd Up" in 2014 originally for herself. She later looked for an artist to give the song to, eventually giving it to Ella Mai after feeling that "synergy of it would be perfect for her."

Mai originally released the song in February 2017 as part of the Ready EP. "Boo'd Up" rose in popularity on social media as well as in nightclubs over the next few months, notably in the Bay Area and later in Dallas, Texas. After Mai served as the opening act on Kehlani's tour, her music reached a bigger audience and the song grew on radio airplay in the spring of 2018. The song became her first top 10 song in the US in the following month, deeming it her "breakthrough hit". Rolling Stone wrote that the single is "one of the biggest singles by a breakout female R&B singer in the past 10 years."

In support of the song and its commercial success, Mai announced a US concert tour titled after the song, during the month of August.

Boo'd up was also sampled for Nettspend's song "Nothing Like Uuu"

== Critical reception ==
In December 2018, Billboard magazine ranked "Boo'd Up" as the third best song of the year. Rolling Stone listed "Boo'd Up" among the 100 best R&B songs of the 21st century, commenting that "it has a piano refrain reminiscent of Stevie Wonder’s “These Three Words.” But it also sounds wholly contemporary. Mai settles into the music with a warm and inviting voice and treats romance as a source of domesticated bliss. As she rhapsodizes about her partner, she confirms that yes, zoomers need love, too."

== Music video ==
An accompanying music video for the song, directed by Nick Walker, premiered via Mai's Vevo channel on 26 April 2018. It features cameo appearances from singer Khalid, rapper Kamaiyah, and YouTube personality Alissa Ashley. Model Donnell Blaylock Jr. plays Mai's love interest in the video.

As of August 2021, the music video has over 460 million views.

== Remixes ==
The official remix of "Boo'd Up" features rappers Nicki Minaj and Quavo, which was released 4 July 2018. Other artists such as MarleyIBe, T-Pain, Fetty Wap, Plies, Fabolous, Dave East, Vado, and Young Dro have released their own remixes to the song and all were credited along with their camps.

== Live performances ==
On 17 November 2018, Mai performed the song on Saturday Night Live, with Jezebel describing Mai as "Pure '90s R&B Heartthrob". It comes on the heels of Ella Mai’s critically acclaimed performance at the BET Awards 2018.

== Charts ==
=== Weekly charts ===
Chart (2018)	Peak position
Australia (ARIA)	46
Canada Hot 100 (Billboard)	43
Ireland (IRMA)	85
Portugal (AFP)	93
UK Singles (Official Charts)	52
US Billboard Hot 100	5
US Hot R&B/Hip-Hop Songs (Billboard)	4
US Pop Airplay (Billboard)	28
US Rhythmic Airplay (Billboard)	3

=== Year-end charts ===
Chart (2018)	Position
US Billboard Hot 100	15
US Hot R&B/Hip-Hop Songs (Billboard)	10
US Rhythmic (Billboard)	16

== Certifications ==
Region	Certification	Certified units/sales
Australia (ARIA)	3× Platinum	210,000^{‡}
Brazil (Pro-Música Brasil)	Gold	20,000^{‡}
Canada (Music Canada)	3× Platinum	240,000^{‡}
New Zealand (RMNZ)	4× Platinum	120,000^{‡}
United Kingdom (BPI)	Platinum	600,000^{‡}
United States (RIAA)	8× Platinum	8,000,000^{‡}
^{‡} Sales+streaming figures based on certification alone.

== Release history ==
Region	Date	Format	Label	Ref.
Worldwide	22 February 2017	Digital download (along with Ready EP)	10 Summers; Interscope	
SiriusXM The Heat	4 February 2018	Rhythmic/R&B Hits	10 Summers; Interscope	
United States	20 February 2018	Rhythmic contemporary	10 Summers; Interscope	
United States	20 February 2018	Urban contemporary	10 Summers; Interscope	
United States	10 July 2018	Contemporary hit radio	10 Summers; Interscope	

== Nicki Minaj and Quavo remix ==
"Boo'd Up" (remix)

Single by Ella Mai, Nicki Minaj and Quavo
- Released: 4 July 2018
- Recorded: 2018
- Genre: R&B; hip hop
- Length: 3:37
- Label: Interscope; Young Money
- Songwriters: Joelle James; Onika Maraj; Quavious Marshall; Ella Mai; Dijon McFarlane; Larrance Dopson

Nicki Minaj singles chronology
"Bed" (2018)	"Boo'd Up" (remix) (2018)	"Fefe" (2018)

Quavo singles chronology
"Ghostbusters" (2018)	"Boo'd Up" (remix) (2018)	"No Brainer" (2018)

A remix of "Boo'd Up" with rappers Nicki Minaj and Quavo was released 4 July 2018.

The remix version of the song features newly added verses and lyrics by both Quavo and Minaj and marks the second collaboration between the two. Its music was also slightly modified with several parts being reorganized and changed.

=== Composition ===
The music of "Boo'd Up" is mostly kept the same as the original, with the sound being slightly altered and several parts reorganized. The remix also contains a reference to Minaj's 2011 song "Super Bass". Migos member Quavo drops an ad-libbed verse of his own. The remix comes to a close with a faux recorded phone conversation between Quavo and Minaj. She asks him to be picked up from somewhere but he's actually already outside.

=== Track listing ===
Digital download – Official Remix
No.	Title	Length
1.	"Boo'd Up (Remix)" (with Nicki Minaj and Quavo)	3:37

=== Charts ===
Chart (2018)	Peak position
Belgium (Ultratip Bubbling Under Flanders)	12
Belgium Urban (Ultratop Flanders)	12
New Zealand (Recorded Music NZ)	8

=== Certifications ===
Region	Certification	Certified units/sales
New Zealand (RMNZ)	Gold	15,000^{‡}
^{‡} Sales+streaming figures based on certification alone.

=== Release history ===
Region	Date	Format	Label	Ref.
Worldwide	4 July 2018	Digital download	Interscope; Young Money	
