= Heart on My Sleeve (album) =

Studio album by Ella Mai
- Released: 6 May 2022
- Recorded: 2019–2021
- Genre: R&B
- Length: 54:43
- Label: 10 Summers; Interscope
- Producer: Bass Charity; Boi-1da; Cam Griffin; Cameron Joseph; D'Mile; DannyBoyStyles; Gylttryp; Harmony Samuels; J. Holt; J.LBS; Jahaan Sweet; Jorgen Odegard; Mustard; Nic Nac; Omar Edwards; P2J; Peter Iskander; The Rascals; Sir Nolan

Ella Mai chronology
Ella Mai (2018)	Heart on My Sleeve (2022)	Do You Still Love Me? (2026)

Singles from Heart on My Sleeve
- 1. "Not Another Love Song" Released: 2 October 2020; 2. "DFMU" Released: 28 January 2022; 3. "Leave You Alone" Released: 31 March 2022; 4. "How" Released: 7 June 2022; 5. "This Is" Released: 14 March 2023

Heart on My Sleeve is the second studio album by English singer and songwriter Ella Mai, released on 6 May 2022 through 10 Summers and Interscope Records. The album was executive-produced by Mustard and Meko Yohannes, and features guest appearances from Latto, Roddy Ricch, and Lucky Daye. It serves as the follow-up to Mai's 2018 self-titled debut album.

== Promotion ==
"Not Another Love Song" was released as the lead single on 2 October 2020. Its music video was released on 20 October 2020. "DFMU" was released on 28 January 2022, as the second single, alongside a music video. "Leave You Alone" was released on 31 March 2022, as the third single. "How" featuring Roddy Ricch was sent to rhythmic contemporary radio on 7 June 2022, as the fourth single. Its music video was released on 28 July 2022.

A deluxe edition of the album featuring three additional songs was released on 2 February 2023 in conjunction with the announcement of Mai's Heart on My Sleeve North American tour. "This Is", a track from the deluxe edition, was sent to rhythmic contemporary radio on 14 March 2023 as the fifth single.

== Critical reception ==
Professional ratings
Aggregate scores
Source	Rating
Metacritic	74/100
Review scores
Source	Rating
AllMusic	3/5 stars
Clash	8/10
The Observer	4/5 stars
Pitchfork	7.3/10
The Telegraph	4/5 stars

Heart on My Sleeve received positive reviews from critics. At Metacritic, which assigns a normalized rating out of 100 to reviews from mainstream critics, the album has an average score of 74 based on six reviews. Clash critic Naima Sutton described Heart on My Sleeve as "back and just as soulful as ever," praising Mai for investing "several incredibly personal parts of her psyche into the project.. She highlighted standout songs like "Not Another Love Song", "Break My Heart", and "Power of A Woman", concluding that while the album's "aural range [...] isn't massive," it remains cohesive, polished, and a strong follow-up to her debut. Pitchfork's Eric Torres described the album as a "solid follow-up that centers her strengths as a singer and songwriter," praising them its lush instrumentation, tactile elements, and well-chosen guest appearances. While noting occasional filler tracks such as "DFMU" and "Feels Like," Torres highlighted how the "best songs are closely in tune with Mai's emotions," with her "sumptuous voice and attention to detail2 making the record a "beguiling delight."

Damien Morris from The Observer observed that Heart on My Sleeve moves beyond the "happy 90s nostalgia" of Mai's debut into "tricksy rhythms and odd magic," noting that while the album is again filled with love songs, Mai demonstrates her skill in "parsing the everyday dramas of twentysomething relationships in relatable [...] language." He highlighted tracks like "Fallen Angel", "Pieces", and "Trying"for their inventive production and forward-looking sound, though he suggested the album could benefit from more local London influence amid its polished American-style production. Kate French-Morris, writing for The Telegraph described Heart on My Sleeve as an album where she continues "swimming in [her] feelings," blending 1990s-inspired R&B with modern self-love and sprightly beats. While noting the album is "still too long," French-Morris praised its emotional maturity, and contributions such as Mary J. Blige's cameo, concluding that Mai demonstrates her intent "not just on orbiting, but becoming” a major R&B star." AllMusic editor Andy Kellman noted that the album continues "Mai's signature style of "spacey slow jams and lingering ballads," describing the album as "writing a little more openly than before." While praising her collaboration with Mustard and other producers, Kellman observed that the album's "lack of variance in tempo [...] makes Heart on My Sleeve downright torpid at points," though he acknowledged that Mai's subtle vibrato and occasional upticks enhance the record.

== Commercial performance ==
In the United States, Heart On My Sleeve debuted and peaked at number 15 on the Billboard 200, number nine on the Top R&B/Hip-Hop Albums and number two on the Top R&B Albums chart, earning 20,000 album-equivalent units (15,000 being pure album sales) in its first week. In the United Kingdom, the album opened and peaked at number 13 on the R&B Albums Chart and number 55 on the Album Downloads Chart, but did not enter the official UK Albums Chart.

== Track listing ==
Heart on My Sleeve track listing
No.	Title	Writer(s)	Producer(s)	Length
1.	"Trying"	Ella Mai; Charles Hinshaw Jr.	Mustard; Gylttryp; Nic Nac	3:17
2.	"Not Another Love Song"	Mai; Varren Wade	Boi-1da; Jahaan Sweet; The Rascals	4:15
3.	"Didn't Say" (featuring Latto)	Mai; Wade; Alyssa Stephens	Mustard; Gylttryp	4:06
4.	"Break My Heart"	Mai; Hinshaw Jr.	D'Mile	3:15
5.	"Fallen Angel"	Mai; Ari PenSmith; James Anderson	P2J; Sweet	4:22
6.	"How" (featuring Roddy Ricch)	Mai; Wade; Rodrick Moore Jr.	Mustard; Nic Nac; Bass Charity	3:38
7.	"Pieces"	Mai; Wade	Sir Nolan; DannyBoyStyles	3:19
8.	"DFMU"	Mai; Hinshaw Jr.; Daemon Landrum; Jonathan Sanders; Tyus Strickland; Donell Jones; Kyle West	Mustard; J. Holt	3:18
9.	"Hide"	Mai; Hinshaw Jr.; Sean Momberger; Leigh Elliott	Mustard; Sean Momberger; Lee Major	3:28
10.	"Power of a Woman"	Mai; Wade	Mustard; Cam Griffin; J.LBS	3:34
11.	"A Mess" (featuring Lucky Daye)	Mai; David Brown; Mike "Hunnid" McGregor	Boi-1da; SMPLGTWY; Peter Iskander; Cameron Joseph	3:54
12.	"Feels Like"	Mai; Chloe George; Steph Jones	Jorgen Odegard	3:20
13.	"Leave You Alone"	Mai; Wade	Harmony Samuels; JV	3:29
14.	"Sink or Swim"	Mai; Hinshaw Jr.	D'Mile	3:55
15.	"Fading Out"	Mai; Wade	Sweet	3:35
Total length:				54:43

Japanese edition bonus track
No.	Title	Writer(s)	Producer(s)	Length
16.	"She Don't" (featuring Ty Dolla Sign)	Mai; Mustard; Lewis Hughes; Nicholas Audino; SickDrumz; Talay Riley; Ty Dolla Sign	Mustard; Twice as Nice	4:24
Total length:				59:07

Deluxe edition
No.	Title	Writer(s)	Producer(s)	Length
16.	"2 O'Clock"	Mai; Ciaran Brennan; Louis Kevin Celestin; Pol Brennan; Wade	Kaytranada	3:50
17.	"This Is"	Mai; Dana Meyers; Grace Redway; Howard Hewett; LaDamon "Fatboi" Douglas; Mustard	LaDamon "Fatboi" Douglas; Mustard	3:26
18.	"Our Song"	Mai; Wade; Aliandro Prawl; Khris Riddick-Tynes	Prawl; Tynes	3:19
Total length:				65:21

=== Notes ===
- "Not Another Love Song" was originally released as a single in 2020; the version on the album is extended and features a spoken-word segment by American singer Mary J. Blige beginning at 3:32. "Sink or Swim" also features Blige beginning at 3:32.
- American singer Kirk Franklin and choir are featured on "Fallen Angel" beginning at 3:18.

== Charts ==
Chart performance for Heart on My Sleeve
Chart (2022)	Peak position
UK Album Downloads (OCC)	55
UK R&B Albums (OCC)	13
US Billboard 200	15
US Top R&B Albums (Billboard)	2
US Top R&B/Hip-Hop Albums (Billboard)	9
