= Love and Compromise =

Studio album by Mahalia
- Released: 6 September 2019
- Genre: R&B
- Length: 43:23
- Label: Asylum

Mahalia chronology
Seasons (2018)	Love and Compromise (2019)	Isolation Tapes (2020)

Singles from Love and Compromise
- 1. "I Wish I Missed My Ex" Released: 31 May 2018; 2. "Do Not Disturb" Released: 6 February 2019; 3. "Simmer" Released: 3 July 2019; 4. "Square 1" Released: 23 August 2019; 5. "What You Did" Released: 4 September 2019

Love and Compromise is the debut studio album by Mahalia. It was released on 6 September 2019. It peaked at number 28 on the UK Albums Chart and number 3 on the UK R&B Albums Chart.

== Critical reception ==
Professional ratings
Aggregate scores
Source	Rating
Metacritic	76/100
Review scores
Source	Rating
AllMusic	4/5 stars
Clash	8/10
The Line of Best Fit	9/10
NME	4/5 stars
The Observer	3/5 stars

At Metacritic, which assigns a weighted average score out of 100 to reviews from mainstream critics, the album received an average score of 76, based on 6 reviews, indicating "generally favorable reviews".

Max Gayler of The Line of Best Fit described the album as "an outrageously consistent record full of sonic momentum and gripping lyricism." Andy Kellman of AllMusic wrote, "No matter how detailed the productions get, they don't obstruct the vocals, which are consistently dynamic without being showy."

== Track listing ==
Love and Compromise track listing
No.	Title	Writer(s)	Producer(s)	Length
1.	"Hide Out"	Mahalia Burkmar; Addrisi Addrisi; Timothy James Worthington	Maths Time Joy	2:49
2.	"I Wish I Missed My Ex"	Burkmar; Alastair O'Donnell; Dan Adekugbe; Nathaniel J. Warner; Worthington; Akelle Charles; Ras Haile Alexander; Louis-Rae Beadle	Maths Time Joy; Swindle	3:25
3.	"Simmer" (featuring Burna Boy)	Burkmar; Wayne Hector; Damini Ogulu; Felix Joseph; Jeremy Harding; Jonah Christian; Kwadwo Amponsah	Joseph; Christian	2:47
4.	"Good Company" (featuring Terrace Martin)	Burkmar; Martin; Joseph; Kevin Roosevelt	Joseph; Roosevelt; Martin	5:07
5.	"What Am I?"	Burkmar; Joseph; Mark Spears; Sam Dew	Larrance 1500; Sounwave	2:28
6.	"Regular People" (featuring Hamzaa and Lucky Daye)	Burkmar; O'Donnell; Dan Diggas; Dustin "Dab" Bowie; Joseph; Malika Hamzaa; Jonny Lattimer; David Brown	DJ Dahi; Joseph	3:01
7.	"Karma"	Burkmar; Diggas; Joseph; Lattimer; Warner	Diggas; Joseph	4:18
8.	"He's Mine"	Burkmar; O'Donnell; Diggas; Joseph; Lattimer	Joseph	3:11
9.	"What You Did" (featuring Ella Mai)	Burkmar; Ella Mai Howell; Andrew "Pop" Wansel; Joseph; Jameel Roberts; Norman Whitfield	Pop Wansel	3:26
10.	"Do Not Disturb"	Burkmar; O'Donnell; Aston Rudi; Joseph; Lattimer	Joseph	3:50
11.	"Richie"	Burkmar; O'Donnell; Joseph; Dew; Spears	Joseph; Sounwave	2:27
12.	"Consistency"	Burkmar; Joseph; Warner	Joseph	2:54
13.	"Square 1"	Burkmar; O'Donnell; Rudi; Diggas; Joseph; Warner	Diggas; Joseph	3:40

== Charts ==
Chart performance for Love and Compromise
Chart (2019)	Peak position
UK Albums (OCC)	28
UK R&B Albums (OCC)	3

== Certifications ==
Certification for Love and Compromise
Region	Certification	Certified units/sales
United Kingdom (BPI)	Silver	60,000^{‡}
^{‡} Sales+streaming figures based on certification alone.
