= Whatchamacallit (Ella Mai song) =

2018 song by Ella Mai featuring Chris Brown

Promotional single by Ella Mai featuring Chris Brown

from the album Ella Mai
- Released: October 4, 2018
- Recorded: 2017
- Genre: R&B
- Length: 3:00
- Label: Interscope Records
- Songwriters: Christopher Brown; Dijon McFarlane; Sam Hook; Jordan Holt; Mai
- Producers: Mustard; Holt (Note: Credited as co-producer)

Audio video
- "Whatchamacallit" on YouTube

"Whatchamacallit" is a song by British singer Ella Mai, featuring American singer Chris Brown, released on October 4, 2018 through Interscope Records as a promotional single from her 2018 self-titled album.

== Background and composition ==
Prior to the making of the song, Ella Mai mentioned Chris Brown as one of her biggest influences: “Vocally, he’s amazing,” she said. “If he didn’t come out the way he did and make the music that he did, I think I would be a completely different artist. He’s influenced an entire generation.” The two then collaborated on "This X-Mas", a track contained in the "Cuffing Season: 12 Days of Christmas" edition of Brown's eighth studio album Heartbreak on a Full Moon (2017). “Whatchamacallit” was originally teased in September 2017, before being released on October 4, 2018 through Interscope Records as a promotional single from Mai's self-titled debut album.

"Whatchamacallit" is an R&B song written by Brown, Sam Hook, Jordan Holt and Mai, while its production was handled by Mustard. On the track the two artists serenade about a secret relationship.

== Critical reception ==
HotNewHipHop praised the song, writing: "Because of the similarity in their voices, Ella Mai and Chris Brown sound absolutely gorgeous together. When one harmonizes with the other, it's almost as if it's just a double of the original vocal, introducing an interesting dynamic to the song that we rarely hear with other artists". The Guardian mentioned Chris Brown as an "A-list feature" on the track.

== Charts ==
Chart (2018)	Peak position
Australia (ARIA)	66
New Zealand (Recorded Music NZ)	21
UK Singles (OCC)	84
US Bubbling Under Hot 100 (Billboard)	3

== Certifications ==
Certifications for "Whatchamacallit"
Region	Certification	Certified units/sales
Australia (ARIA)	Platinum	70,000^{‡}
Canada (Music Canada)	Gold	40,000^{‡}
New Zealand (RMNZ)	2× Platinum	60,000^{‡}
United Kingdom (BPI)	Silver	200,000^{‡}
United States (RIAA)	Platinum	1,000,000^{‡}
^{‡} Sales+streaming figures based on certification alone.
