= DFMU =

2022 single by Ella Mai

Single by Ella Mai

from the album Heart on My Sleeve
- Released: 28 January 2022
- Genre: R&B
- Length: 3:17
- Label: 10 Summers; Interscope
- Songwriters: Ella Howell; Charles Hinshaw Jr.; Daemon Landrum; Jonathan Sanders; Tyus Strickland; Donell Jones; Kyle West
- Producers: Mustard; J. Holt

Ella Mai singles chronology
"Not Another Love Song" (2020)	"DFMU" (2022)	"How" (2022)

"DFMU" (initialism for Don’t Fuck Me Up) is a song by English singer-songwriter Ella Mai. It was released on 28 January 2022 through 10 Summers and Interscope Records from her second studio album, Heart on My Sleeve (2022). It was produced by Mustard and co-produced by J. Holt.

== Background and composition ==
Following the release of the single "Not Another Love Song" (2020), Mai took a hiatus from recording and public life. In October 2021, the singer revealed on her social media accounts that she had returned to the recording studio. The song was written in 2020 during a writing session with Mustard. In an interview with Apple Music 1 Mai explaining the meaning and writing process of the song:

"It was almost a therapy session when I was in the session. But I think that’s the best way. All the people that I grew up listening to are always very, very honest. And I’ve always just appreciated honesty. I think it’s the best way I think that people can relate to you also so. [...] I was having a very honest conversation with Prince Charlez who I wrote the song with about I was going through at that point. And it just was basically a conversation, and it just came together that way. And I think those are the best songs because storytelling is just conversation really. It was one of the ones during the recording process that I just knew it had to make"

== Live performance ==
Mai performed a medley of "DFMU" and "Leave You Alone" at The Tonight Show Starring Jimmy Fallon in May 2022.

== Music video ==
The music video for the song, directed by Loris Russier, was released on 2 February 2022 through the singer's YouTube channel.

== Charts ==
Weekly chart performance for "DFMU"
Chart (2022)	Peak position
US Billboard Hot 100	85
US Hot R&B/Hip-Hop Songs (Billboard)	22
US Hot R&B Songs (Billboard)	3
US Adult R&B Songs (Billboard)	1

== Certifications ==
Certifications for "DFMU"
Region	Certification	Certified units/sales
United States (RIAA)	Platinum	1,000,000^{‡}
^{‡} Sales+streaming figures based on certification alone.
