= Ready (Ella Mai EP) =

EP by Ella Mai
- Released: 22 February 2017
- Recorded: 2016
- Genre: R&B
- Length: 21:50
- Label: 10 Summers; Interscope
- Producer: DJ Mustard

Ella Mai chronology
Change (2016)	Ready (2017)	Ella Mai (2018)

Singles from Ready
- 1. "Boo'd Up" Released: 20 February 2018

Ready is the third EP by English singer and songwriter Ella Mai. The extended play is the third of the trilogy leading up to her debut album. It was released by 10 Summers and produced by DJ Mustard.

== Singles ==
The song "Anymore" was released a week prior to the EP as a promotional single. In early 2018 "Boo'd Up" started receiving unexpected attention, and was released as a single accompanied by a music video on 26 April, as Ella Mai topped the Emerging Artists chart. The song also topped the YouTube songs chart and Billboard Hot R&B chart in the US.

== Critical reception ==
EarMilk said "On each of her EPs – Time, Change, and Ready – Mai is poignant in her delivery of unashamed lyrics. Her mature navigation of love becomes more poignant and straightforward with each release. DJ Mustard found a secret weapon in Ella Mai, and the sky's the limit for the budding star."

== Track listing ==
Credits adapted from Tidal

No.	Title	Writer(s)	Producer(s)	Length
1.	"Boo'd Up"	Joelle James; Larrance Dopson; Dijon McFarlane; Ella Mai	DJ Mustard	4:16
2.	"Breakfast in Bed"	McFarlane; Lewis Hughes; Romans; Mai; Te White Warbrick; Nicholas Audino	DJ Mustard	3:57
3.	"Nobody Else"	McFarlane; Gordon Chambers; Willie Tafa; Dave Hall; Nichole Gilbert; Mai	DJ Mustard	3:00
4.	"My Way"	James Royo; Mai; Samuel Jean; McFarlane	DJ Mustard	3:11
5.	"Makes Me Wonder"	Warbrick; Mai; Romans; McFarlane; Charles Hinshaw, Jr.; Audino; Hughes	DJ Mustard	3:30
6.	"Anymore"	Mai; Jameel Roberts; Talay Riley; Ronald "Flip" Colson; McFarlane	DJ Mustard	3:55
Total length:				21:50

== Charts ==
=== Weekly charts ===
Weekly chart performance for Ready
Chart (2018)	Peak position
Canadian Albums (Billboard)	86
US Billboard 200	29
US Top R&B/Hip-Hop Albums (Billboard)	17

=== Year-end charts ===
Year-end chart performance for Ready
Chart (2018)	Position
US Billboard 200	174
US Top R&B/Hip-Hop Albums (Billboard)	72
