= Trip (Ella Mai song) =

2018 R&B song by Ella Mai

Single by Ella Mai

from the album Ella Mai
- Released: 3 August 2018
- Recorded: 2018
- Genre: R&B
- Length: 3:37
- Label: 10 Summers; Interscope
- Songwriters: Ella Mai Howell; Varren Wade; Quintin Q Gulledge; Dijon MacFarlane
- Producers: DJ Mustard; Quintin Q Gulledge

Ella Mai singles chronology
"Boo'd Up" (2018)	"Trip" (2018)	"Shot Clock" (2019)

Music video
- "Trip" on YouTube

"Trip" is a song by English singer Ella Mai from her first album Ella Mai. The song peaked at number 47 in the UK and number 11 on the Billboard Hot 100 in the United States. The song was written by Mai, Varren Wade, Quinton, and Dijon MacFarlane. The single became her first number one on Billboard's Rhythmic chart in its 22 December 2018 issue.

== Music video ==
An accompanying music video for the song premiered via Mai's Vevo channel on 18 September 2018.

== Jacquees remix ==
Cash Money R&B singer Jacquees' "Quemix" of the track gained huge popularity, receiving millions of streams on YouTube and SoundCloud. However, Jacquees' version was removed from both platforms on 5 September. Ella Mai's label boss DJ Mustard later said that his label 10 Summers sent a cease and desist, claiming Jacquees had attempted to monetize the remix and accused him of "stealing" from 10 Summers. Jacquees disputed these claims.

== Charts ==
=== Weekly charts ===
Chart (2018–2019)	Peak position
Australia (ARIA)	77
Canada Hot 100 (Billboard)	78
Netherlands (Single Top 100)	100
New Zealand (Recorded Music NZ)	22
UK Singles (Official Charts)	47
US Billboard Hot 100	11
US Hot R&B/Hip-Hop Songs (Billboard)	6
US Pop Airplay (Billboard)	39
US Rhythmic Airplay (Billboard)	1

=== Year-end charts ===
Chart (2018)	Position
US Billboard Hot 100	92
US Hot R&B/Hip-Hop Songs (Billboard)	46
Chart (2019)	Position
US Billboard Hot 100	80
US Hot R&B/Hip-Hop Songs (Billboard)	39
US Rhythmic (Billboard)	37

== Certifications ==
Region	Certification	Certified units/sales
Australia (ARIA)	3× Platinum	210,000^{‡}
Brazil (Pro-Música Brasil)	Platinum	40,000^{‡}
Canada (Music Canada)	3× Platinum	240,000^{‡}
New Zealand (RMNZ)	4× Platinum	120,000^{‡}
Portugal (AFP)	Gold	5,000^{‡}
United Kingdom (BPI)	Platinum	600,000^{‡}
United States (RIAA)	6× Platinum	6,000,000^{‡}
^{‡} Sales+streaming figures based on certification alone.

== Release history ==
Region	Date	Format	Label	Ref.
Various	3 August 2018	Digital download	10 Summers; Interscope	
United States	4 December 2018	Contemporary hit radio	Interscope	
