= Tell Her (Ella Mai song) =

Single by Ella Mai

from the album Do You Still Love Me?
- Released: 29 August 2025
- Genre: R&B
- Length: 3:17
- Label: 10 Summers; Interscope
- Songwriters: Ella Howell; Dijon McFarlane; Prince Charlez; Fred Jerkins III; Beyoncé Knowles-Carter; Kelendria Trene Rowland; LaShawn Daniels; LaTavia Roberson; LeToya Luckett; Luca Starz; Rodney Jerkins
- Producers: Mustard; Starz

Ella Mai singles chronology
"Little Things" (2024)	"Tell Her" (2025)	"100" (2026)

Music video
- "Tell Her" on YouTube

"Tell Her" is a song by English singer-songwriter Ella Mai. It was released on 29 August 2025 through 10 Summers and Interscope Records as the second single from her third studio album, Do You Still Love Me? (2026). It was produced by Mustard and Luca Starz and interpolated Destiny's Child's song "Say My Name" (1999).

== Composition ==
The song was written by the singer herself with Prince Charlez, Mustard and Luca Starz, the letter two who produced the song. It interpolate Destiny's Child's 1999 song "Say My Name".

== Critics reception ==
Gabriel Bras Nevares of HotNewHipHop wrote that the song has "a pretty straightforward R&B production" with "hi-hats and crashes, snaps, pitched-up persistent vocal samples, and watery background synth pads moving things along". Italian music critic Damiano Pandolfini of Ondarock prised "Tell Her", writing that it is the best album track which "captures the lyrical essence of the author".

== Charts ==
=== Weekly charts ===
Weekly chart performance for "Tell Her"
Chart (2025)	Peak position
US Hot R&B/Hip-Hop Songs (Billboard)	33
US Hot R&B Songs (Billboard)	9
US Adult R&B Songs (Billboard)	27
