= Ella Mai (album) =

Studio album by Ella Mai
- Released: 12 October 2018
- Recorded: 2017–2018
- Genre: R&B
- Length: 52:06
- Labels: 10 Summers; Interscope
- Producers: Andrew Groziuso; Bryan-Michael Cox; Dimi Sloane Sesson II; Giscard Friedman; Harmony Samuels; J Holt; Kosine; Lido; Miykal Snoddy; Mustard; Nana Rogues; Omer Fedi; Quinton Gulledge; Rance; Thomas Strahle

Ella Mai chronology
Ready (2017)	Ella Mai (2018)	Heart on My Sleeve (2022)

Singles from Ella Mai
- 1. "Boo'd Up" Released: 20 February 2018; 2. "Trip" Released: 3 August 2018; 3. "Shot Clock" Released: 20 November 2018

Ella Mai is the debut studio album by English singer and songwriter Ella Mai, released on 12 October 2018 through 10 Summers and Interscope Records. It includes the singles "Boo'd Up" and "Trip". It is executive-produced by Mustard, and features guest appearances from Chris Brown, John Legend, and H.E.R.

"Boo'd Up" was originally included on Mai's 2017 EP Ready and reached number five on the US Billboard Hot 100 in July 2018. The follow-up single, "Trip", released in August 2018, has reached number 11. After her own headline tour of the United States, Mai appeared as a supporting act on dates of Bruno Mars' 24K Magic World Tour from 4 October leading up to the release of the album. The album debuted in the top 20 in the UK and at number five on the US Billboard 200. The album was nominated for Best R&B Album at the 62nd Annual Grammy Awards.

== Background ==
In August 2018, Mustard explained to Billboard that upon signing Mai, there was a plan to make three EPs and see if any of the songs caught enough public attention to make an album. Following the success of "Boo'd Up", Mustard said: "So the plan worked. What people don't understand, this is like my little sister. This project coming is like my baby. I'm pressing for it more than my own shit. It's all about her right now."

== Music ==
The album has been called a "throwback R&B record", with influences from trap and rap. Interviewed by Keryce Chelsi Henry of Forbes, Ella Mai talked about the creative process and musical arrangements for the album:

"Mustard and I really wanted to make sure that the album was cohesive with the EPs, sound-wise, but also elevated; [...] I worked with a few other producers on the album to add more variety, but as executive producer, Mustard really worked hard with me to expand our sound and create something that we love and are extremely proud of. [...] During the recording process I really had to dig deep, challenge and push myself to the limits. I hope that listening to Ella Mai makes you feel the exact same way I felt when I was recording it."

Professional ratings
Aggregate scores
Source	Rating
Metacritic	73/100
Review scores
Source	Rating
Exclaim!	7/10
The Guardian	4/5 stars
The Observer	3/5 stars
Rolling Stone	3/5 stars
Pitchfork	6.6/10
NME	4/5 stars

== Commercial performance ==
Ella Mai debuted at number 18 on the UK Albums Chart, becoming her first entry on that chart. It was certified gold by the BPI in August 2022.

In the United States, the album debuted at number 5 on the US Billboard 200, earning 69,000 album-equivalent units (including 17,000 were pure album sales) in its first week. This became Mai's highest entry on the chart. Less than two weeks later, the album was certified gold by the Recording Industry Association of America (RIAA) for combined sales and album-equivalent units of over 500,000 units in the United States. In March 2019, the album was then certified platinum by the Recording Industry Association of America (RIAA) for combined sales and album-equivalent units of over 1,000,000 units in the United States. As of October 2021, the album would go on to reach double platinum status for combined sales and album-equivalent units of over 2,000,000 units in the United States.

== Track listing ==
Adapted from Tidal, Mai's Twitter, DJ Mustard's Instagram, ASCAP, and BMI.

No.	Title	Writer(s)	Producer(s)	Length
1.	"Emotion"	Myles Jason Howell		0:12
2.	"Good Bad"	J. Warner; Ella Mai; Nana Rogues	Rogues	3:49
3.	"Dangerous"	Bryan-Michael Cox; Charles 'Prince Charlez' Hinshaw; Mai	Cox	4:39
4.	"Sauce"	Quintin Gulledge; Mai; Dijon McFarlane; Varren Wade	Mustard; Gulledge^{[b]}	3:04
5.	"Whatchamacallit" (featuring Chris Brown)	Christopher Brown; McFarlane; Sam Hook; Jordan Holt; Mai	Mustard; Holt^{[a]}	3:00
6.	"Cheapshot"	Harmony Samuels; Mai; Wade; Shawn Butler; Edgar Etienne	H*Money	4:01
7.	"Shot Clock"	Micah John; Aubrey Graham; McFarlane; Mai; Jahron Brathwaite; Benjamin Bush; Timothy Mosley	DJ Mustard	3:21
8.	"Boo'd Up"	Mai; Joelle James; McFarlane; Larrance "Rance" Dopsin	Mustard; Rance^{[a]}	3:59
9.	"Everything" (featuring John Legend)	McFarlane; Gulledge; Mai; Jeff Shum; Dayyon Alexander	Rush Hr.; Mustard^{[a]}; Gulledge^{[b]}	3:01
10.	"Own It"	David Brown; Mai; Marcos Palacios; Miykal Snoddy; Eric Bishop; Billy Moss	Kosine; Snoddy	4:11
11.	"Run My Mouth"	McFarlane; Mai; Harloe	Mustard	2:35
12.	"Gut Feeling" (featuring H.E.R.)	McFarlane; Caroline Ailin; Gabriella Wilson; Mai; Brandon Treyshun Campbell; Gulledge	Mustard; Gulledge^{[b]}	3:56
13.	"Trip"	McFarlane; Mai; Wade; Gulledge	Mustard; Gulledge; ^{[b]}	3:34
14.	"Close"	Mai; Wade; McFarlane; Bulledge	Mustard; Gulledge^{[b]}	4:12
15.	"Easy"	Peder Losnegård; Mai; Charles; McFarlane; Robbie Grey; Gary McDowell; Richard Brown; Michael Conroy; Stephen Walker; Gulledge	Lido; Mustard^{[a]}; Gulledge^{[b]}	4:32
Total length:				52:06

Digital bonus track / Target exclusive track & Japanese Bonus Tracks
No.	Title	Writer(s)	Producer(s)	Length
16.	"Naked"	Samuel Jean; Mai; McFarlane; Hook; Daniel Jean; Omer Fedi; Paul Jean; Nathalie Jean; Timothy Jean; Dimi Sloane Sesson II; Giscard Friedman; Andrew Groziuso	Mustard; Fedi^{[a]}; Groziuso^{[a]}; Sesson II^{[a]}; Friedman^{[a]}	3:17

Japanese bonus tracks
No.	Title	Writer(s)	Length
17.	"Boo'd Up (Remix)" (featuring Nicki Minaj & Quavo)	Mai; Joelle James; McFarlane; Larrance "Rance" Dopsin; Onika Maraj; Quavo Marshall	3:37
Total length:			59:07

Notes

- ^{^[a]} signifies a co-producer
- ^{^[b]} signifies an additional producer

== Personnel ==
Credits adapted from Tidal.

=== Performance ===
- Ella Mai – main artist
- Chris Brown – featured artist (track 5)
- John Legend – featured artist (track 9)
- H.E.R. – featured artist (track 12)
- MUSYCA Children's Choir– vocals (track 15)

=== Production ===
- Nana Rogues – production (track 2)
- Bryan-Michael Cox – production (track 3)
- Harmony Samuels – production (track 6)
- Kosine – production (track 10)
- Miykal Snoddy – production (track 10)
- Mustard – production (tracks 4–5, 7–8, 11–14, and 16), co-production (tracks 9 and 15)
- Lido – production (track 15)
- Quintin Gulledge – additional production (tracks 4, 9, and 12–15)
- J Holt – co-production (track 5)
- Rance – co-production (track 8)
- Andrew Groziuso – co-production (track 16)
- Dimi Sloane Sesson II – co-production (track 16)
- Giscard Friedman – co-production (track 16)
- Omer Fedi – co-production (track 16)
- Thomas Strahle – co-production (track 16)

=== Instrumentation ===
- Marlon M. Williams – guitar (track 9)

=== Technical ===
- Jaycen Joshua – mixing (tracks 2–7, 9–16)
- Jacob Richards – mixing (track 13)
- Mike Seaberg – mixing (track 13)
- Rashawn McLean – mixing (tracks 1 and 13)
- Chris Athens – mastering (tracks 1–7, 9–15)

== Charts ==
=== Weekly charts ===
Chart (2018)	Peak position
Australian Albums (ARIA)	19
Belgian Albums (Ultratop Flanders)	94
Belgian Albums (Ultratop Wallonia)	168
Canadian Albums (Billboard)	16
Dutch Albums (Album Top 100)	31
Irish Albums (IRMA)	55
Japan Hot Albums (Billboard Japan)	89
Japan Top Download Albums (Billboard)	1
Japanese Albums (Oricon)	159
New Zealand Albums (RMNZ)	7
UK Albums (Official Charts)	18
UK R&B Albums (Official Charts)	3
US Billboard 200	5
US Top R&B/Hip-Hop Albums (Billboard)	4

=== Year-end charts ===
Chart (2018)	Position
US Top R&B/Hip-Hop Albums (Billboard)	75

Chart (2019)	Position
New Zealand Albums (RMNZ)	29
US Billboard 200	41
US Top R&B/Hip-Hop Albums (Billboard)	20

Chart (2020)	Position
New Zealand Albums (RMNZ)	50
US Billboard 200	193

== Certifications ==
Region	Certification	Certified units/sales
Australia (ARIA)	Gold	35,000^{‡}
Canada (Music Canada)	Platinum	80,000^{‡}
New Zealand (RMNZ)	3× Platinum	45,000^{‡}
United Kingdom (BPI)	Gold	100,000^{‡}
United States (RIAA)	2× Platinum	2,000,000^{‡}
^{‡} Sales+streaming figures based on certification alone.
