= Ella Mai =

British singer (born 1994)

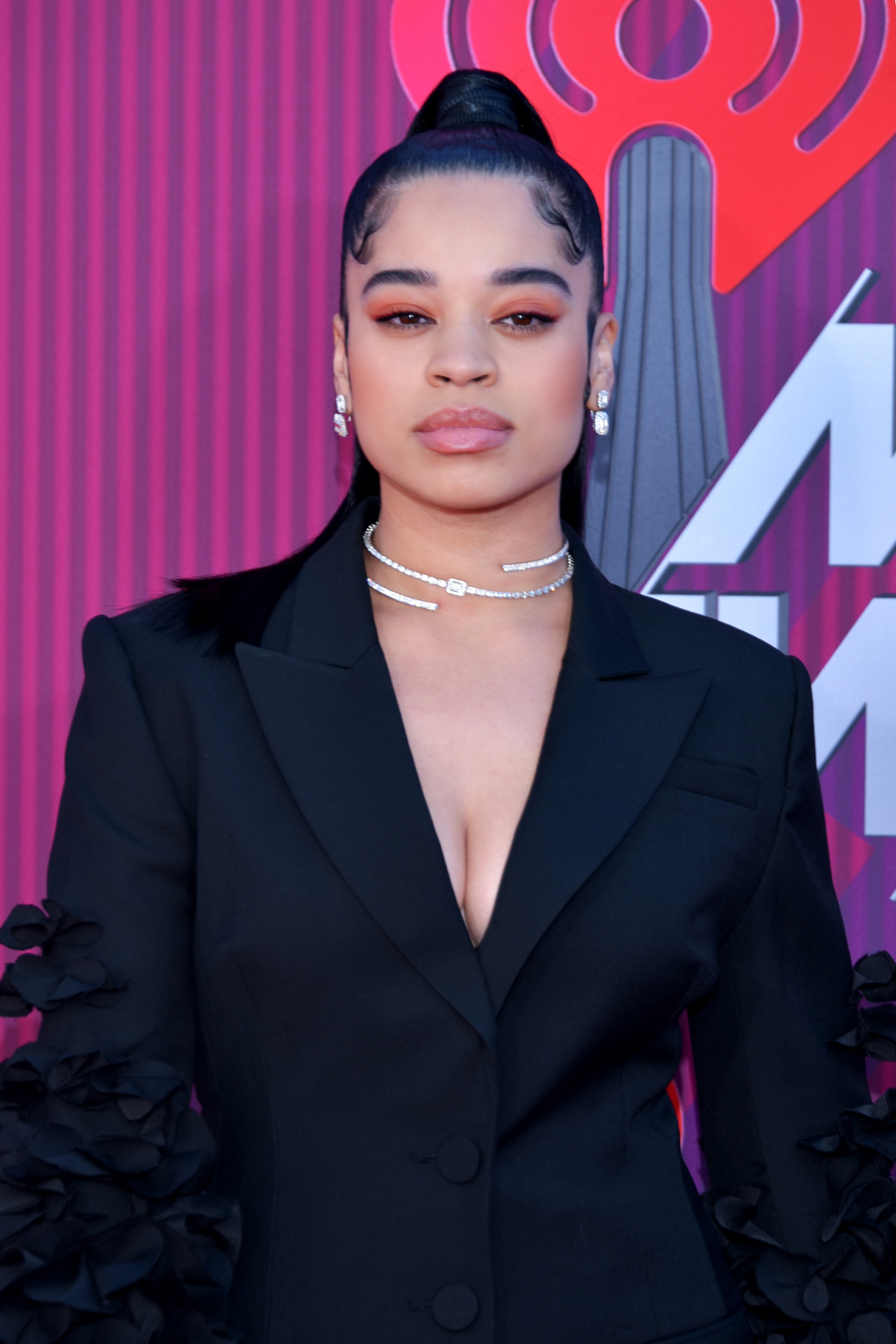
- Mai in 2019

Background information
- Born: Ella Mai Howell; 3 November 1994 (age 32); London, United Kingdom
- Genre: R&B
- Occupations: Singer; songwriter
- Years active: 2014–present
- Labels: 10 Summers; Interscope
- Producer(s): Mustard
- Formerly of: Arize
- Partner: Jayson Tatum (2022–present)
- Children: 1
- Website: ellamai.com

Ella Mai Howell (born 3 November 1994) is a British R&B singer and songwriter. Her career began at London's British and Irish Modern Music Institute. In 2014, she auditioned as part of a trio on the 11th season of The X Factor. In 2015, she released her debut four-track solo extended play (EP), Troubled in October of that year. The EP and her performances on social media were discovered by American record producer DJ Mustard, who signed Mai to his label 10 Summers Records, an imprint of Interscope Records.

Her third EP, Ready (2017), spawned the single "Boo'd Up". A sleeper hit, the song peaked at number five on the Billboard Hot 100, and was followed by "Trip", which peaked at number 11. The former won Best R&B Song and was nominated for Song of the Year at the 61st Annual Grammy Awards; both songs preceded the release of her self-titled debut studio album (2018), which peaked at number five on the US Billboard 200.

Her second album, Heart on My Sleeve (2022), failed to reach the UK Albums Chart, but performed moderately on the US Billboard 200, promoted by the single "DFMU", which debuted on the Billboard Hot 100. Her third studio album Do You Still Love Me? was published in February 2026, promoted by singles "Tell Her" and "Little Things".

Mai was nominated for British Breakthrough Act at the Brit Awards 2019. That same year, she won three awards at the 2019 Billboard Music Awards, including Top R&B Artist, three IHeartRadio Music Awards, three NAACP Image Awards and two Soul Train Music Awards, including the Songwriter's Award.

== Early life and education ==
Ella Mai was born on 3 November 1994 to a Jamaican mother and an English-Irish father in London. Her mother, a lover of American jazz music, named her after Ella Fitzgerald. Mai moved from London to New York City at the age of 12 when her mother took on a teaching job there. Mai's transition to life in New York City was difficult because she was often bullied for her accent. Mai graduated from Queens High School of Teaching in Glen Oaks, Queens, before returning to England aged 17.

== Career ==
Ella Mai's singing career began while studying at the British and Irish Modern Music Institute London (BIMM London) in 2014. During that time she competed on series 11 of The X Factor as part of a trio, 'Arize', but didn't advance beyond the initial audition for the judges. The group broke up shortly thereafter.

=== 2015–2019: Debut album ===
During 2015, Ella Mai uploaded a four-track solo EP of original recorded songs to SoundCloud titled Troubled. After its release, Mai was discovered on Instagram and signed to American hip hop producer DJ Mustard's label, 10 Summers Records, which operates as part of Interscope Records. In February 2016, she released Time, the first in her EP trilogy. The six-track EP included the single "She Don't", which featured Mustard's frequent collaborator, singer Ty Dolla Sign. She released her second EP, Change, in November 2016 and third, Ready, in February 2017. "Boo'd Up", which was featured on the EP, rose in popularity on social media as well as in nightclubs over the next few months. Ella Mai toured with Kehlani on her SweetSexySavage World Tour. After Mai served as the opening act on Kehlani's tour, her music reached a bigger audience and the song grew on radio airplay in the spring of 2018.

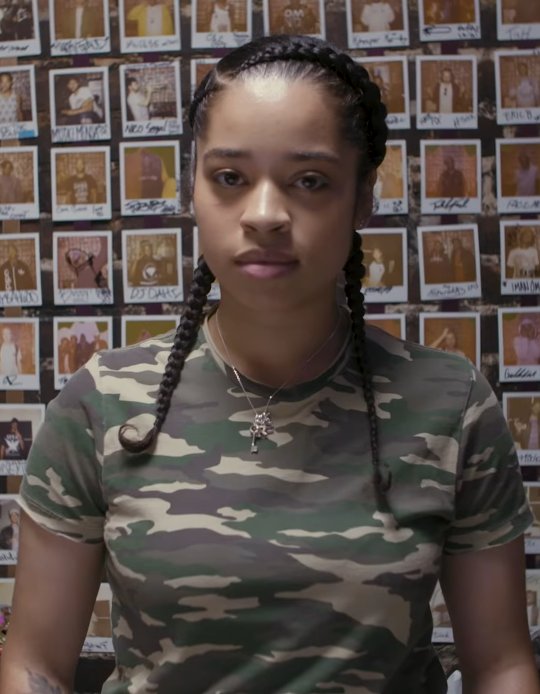
Ella Mai in 2017

On 26 April 2018, she released a music video for "Boo'd Up" after it started to gain popularity. The song became her first top ten song in the US in the following month, deeming it her "breakthrough hit". Rolling Stone wrote that the single is "one of the biggest singles by a breakout female R&B singer in the past 10 years." The single peaked at number five on the US Billboard Hot 100, and broke the record for the most weeks at number one of any song by a woman on the R&B/Hip-Hop Airplay chart. On 14 August, she joined Bruno Mars on the 24K Magic World Tour after Cardi B dropped out.

On 3 August, she released the single "Trip", with an accompanied music video releasing on 18 September. The song peaked at number 11 on the Billboard Hot 100. Ella Mai released her debut album Ella Mai, a 16-track set featuring "Boo'd Up", on 12 October 2018, with guest appearances from Chris Brown, John Legend, and H.E.R. The album sold 69,000 album-equivalent units with 17,000 coming from pure sales. On 22 October 2018, Mai announced her debut tour set to begin in January 2019. In November, she made two guest appearances on JID's song "Tiiied", along with 6lack and on Meek Mill's song "24/7", on the albums Dicapiro 2 and Championships respectively. On 18 November, she performed on Saturday Night Live with Jezebel describing Mai as "Pure '90s R&B Heartthrob".

Mai was also nominated for two Grammy Awards: Best R&B Song and Song of the Year with "Boo'd Up", winning for the former. "Boo'd Up" would go onto to win the 2019 Billboard Music Award for Top R&B Song. In 2019, Mai won the Billboard Music Awards for Top R&B Artist and Top Female R&B Artist. Apart from her music, Mai also performed a sketch on Nickelodeon's All That (which aired on 27 July 2019) called "Boo'd Up", a paranormal parody of The Dating Game, in which she played herself as a contestant looking for a ghost to haunt her family home, but instead of choosing the three suitors offered, she chose her former ghost who came back and she forgave him. In 2020, Mai received her third nomination for the Grammy Award for Best R&B Album for her debut album at the 62nd Grammy Awards.

=== 2020–present: Heart on My Sleeve and Do You Still Love Me? ===
On 2 October 2020, Mai released the single, "Not Another Love Song". On Friday, 28 January 2022, she released "DFMU". On 28 March 2022 Mai announced the title of her second studio album Heart on My Sleeve which was released on 6 May 2022. the album debuted at number 15 on the Billboard 200 making it her second top 20 on the chart. In 2023 she embraced the Heart on My Sleeve Tour in North America.

In November 2024, following the birth of her son, her first child with Boston Celtics player Jayson Tatum, she issued 3, her fifth extended play, as a surprise project to commemorate her 30th birthday. Lead single "Little Things" became another top ten hit on the R&B charts for Mai, and served as a precursor to her third studio album, Do You Still Love Me?, which was released in February 2026.

== Personal life ==
In 2024, Mai and NBA star Jayson Tatum of the Boston Celtics had a son named Dylan. Mai chooses to keep Dylan, her relationship with Tatum, and other personal relationships private. She says that being intentional about how she moves in public makes it easier to protect her peace.

== Artistry ==
In multiple interviews, Ella Mai names Lauryn Hill, Chris Brown, Brandy, Beyoncé, Destiny's Child, Alicia Keys, and Mariah Carey as her biggest influences. Vibe said her "perception of the powerful emotion is kindred to R&B heartthrobs of the '90s, who flooded the radio airwaves with soulful ballads, baby-making tunes, and heart-wrenching break-up anthems." Rolling Stone described her sound as "a British émigré full of self-confidence and an affinity for classic Nineties R&B."

== Discography ==
- Ella Mai (2018)
- Heart on My Sleeve (2022)
- Do You Still Love Me? (2026)

== Tours ==
=== Headlining ===
- The Debut Tour (2019–2020)
- Heart on My Sleeve Tour (2023)
- Do you still love me? Tour (2026)

=== Opening act ===
- Kehlani – SweetSexySavage Tour (2017)
- Ariana Grande – Sweetener World Tour (European Leg) (2019)
- Mary J. Blige – Good Morning Gorgeous Tour (2022)

== Awards and nominations ==
Award	Year (Note: Indicates the year of ceremony. Each year is linked to the article about the awards held that year, wherever possible.)	Recipient(s) and nominee(s)	Category	Result	Ref.
American Music Awards	2018	Herself	Favorite Female Artist – Soul/R&B	Nominated	
American Music Awards	2018	"Boo'd Up"	Favorite Song – Soul/R&B	Nominated	
American Music Awards	2019	Herself	New Artist of the Year	Nominated	
American Music Awards	2019	Herself	Favorite Female Artist – Soul/R&B	Nominated	
American Music Awards	2019	"Trip"	Favorite Song – Soul/R&B	Nominated	
American Music Awards	2019	Ella Mai	Favorite Album – Soul/R&B	Nominated	
BET Awards	2019	"Trip"	Coca-Cola Viewers' Choice Award	Won	
BET Awards	2023	Herself	Best International Act	Nominated	
BET Awards	2026	"100"	Video of the Year	Nominated	
BET Awards	2026	Herself	Best Female R&B/Pop Artist	Nominated	
Billboard Music Awards	2019	Herself	Top Female Artist	Nominated	
Billboard Music Awards	2019	Herself	Top New Artist	Nominated	
Billboard Music Awards	2019	Herself	Top R&B Artist	Won	
Billboard Music Awards	2019	Herself	Top R&B Female Artist	Won	
Billboard Music Awards	2019	"Boo'd Up"	Top R&B Song	Won	
Billboard Music Awards	2019	"Trip"	Top R&B Song	Nominated	
Billboard Music Awards	2019	Ella Mai	Top R&B Album	Nominated	
BMI London Awards	2020	"24/7"	Most Performed Songs	Won	
BMI London Awards	2021	"What You Did"	Million-Air Award	Won	
BMI R&B/Hip-Hop Awards	2019	"Boo'd Up"	Winning Song	Won	
Brit Awards	2019	Herself	Best Breakthrough Act	Nominated	
Grammy Awards	2019	"Boo'd Up"	Song of the Year	Nominated	
Grammy Awards	2019	"Boo'd Up"	Best R&B Song	Won	
Grammy Awards	2020	Ella Mai	Best R&B Album	Nominated	
Grammy Awards	2023	"Keeps on Fallin'" (with Babyface)	Best Traditional R&B Performance	Nominated	
iHeartRadio Music Awards	2019	Herself	Best New R&B Artist	Won	
iHeartRadio Music Awards	2019	Herself	R&B Artist of the Year	Won	
iHeartRadio Music Awards	2019	"Boo'd Up"	R&B Song of the Year	Won	
iHeartRadio Music Awards	2020	Herself	R&B Artist of the Year	Nominated	
iHeartRadio Music Awards	2020	"Shot Clock"	R&B Song of the Year	Nominated	
MOBO Awards	2020	Ella Mai	Best Album	Won	
MOBO Awards	2022	Herself	Best R&B/Soul Act	Nominated	
MTV Video Music Awards	2018	"Boo'd Up"	Song of Summer	Nominated	
MTV Video Music Awards	2019	"Trip"	Best R&B	Nominated	
NAACP Image Awards	2019	Herself	Outstanding New Artist	Won	
NAACP Image Awards	2019	Herself	Outstanding Female Artist	Nominated	
NAACP Image Awards	2019	"Boo'd Up"	Outstanding Song, Contemporary	Won	
NAACP Image Awards	2019	Ella Mai	Outstanding Album	Won	
Soul Train Music Awards	2018	"Boo'd Up"	Song of the Year	Nominated	
Soul Train Music Awards	2018	"Boo'd Up"	The Ashford & Simpson Songwriter's Award	Won	
Soul Train Music Awards	2018	"Boo'd Up"	Video of the Year	Nominated	
Soul Train Music Awards	2018	Herself	Best R&B/Soul Female Artist	Won	
Soul Train Music Awards	2019	Ella Mai	Album of the Year	Nominated	
Soul Train Music Awards	2019	"Shot Clock"	Song of the Year	Nominated	
Soul Train Music Awards	2020	"Don't Waste My Time" (with Usher)	Song of the Year	Nominated	
Soul Train Music Awards	2020	"Don't Waste My Time" (with Usher)	Best Collaboration	Nominated	
