= Billboard Year-End Hot R&B/Hip-Hop Songs of 2018 =

American music chart

This is a list of Billboard magazine's Top Hot R&B/Hip-Hop Songs of 2018.

No.	Title	Artist(s)
1	"God's Plan"	Drake
2	"I Like It"	Cardi B, Bad Bunny and J Balvin
3	"In My Feelings"	Drake
4	"Psycho"	Post Malone featuring Ty Dolla Sign
5	"Nice for What"	Drake
6	"Rockstar"	Post Malone featuring 21 Savage
7	"Lucid Dreams"	Juice Wrld
8	"Better Now"	Post Malone
9	"Finesse"	Bruno Mars featuring Cardi B
10	"Boo'd Up"	Ella Mai
11	"Look Alive"	BlocBoy JB featuring Drake
12	"Sad!"	XXXTentacion
13	"Yes Indeed"	Lil Baby and Drake
14	"Taste"	Tyga featuring Offset
15	"Fefe"	6ix9ine, Nicki Minaj and Murda Beatz
16	"MotorSport"	Migos, Nicki Minaj and Cardi B
17	"Let You Down"	NF
18	"No Limit"	G-Eazy featuring ASAP Rocky and Cardi B
19	"Pray for Me"	The Weeknd and Kendrick Lamar
20	"Gucci Gang"	Lil Pump
21	"Sicko Mode"	Travis Scott
22	"Walk It Talk It"	Migos featuring Drake
23	"Him & I"	G-Eazy and Halsey
24	"Stir Fry"	Migos
25	"All the Stars"	Kendrick Lamar and SZA
26	"This Is America"	Childish Gambino
27	"Nonstop"	Drake
28	"I Fall Apart"	Post Malone
29	"Freaky Friday"	Lil Dicky featuring Chris Brown
30	"Gummo"	6ix9ine
31	"Ric Flair Drip"	Offset and Metro Boomin
32	"Be Careful"	Cardi B
33	"Plug Walk"	Rich the Kid
34	"Bartier Cardi"	Cardi B featuring 21 Savage
35	"Big Bank"	YG featuring 2 Chainz, Big Sean and Nicki Minaj
36	"Love."	Kendrick Lamar featuring Zacari
37	"Moonlight"	XXXTentacion
38	"No Brainer"	DJ Khaled featuring Justin Bieber, Chance the Rapper and Quavo
39	"Plain Jane"	ASAP Ferg featuring Nicki Minaj
40	"I Get the Bag"	Gucci Mane featuring Migos
41	"King's Dead"	Jay Rock, Kendrick Lamar, Future and James Blake
42	"Lemon"	N.E.R.D. and Rihanna
43	"Call Out My Name"	The Weeknd
44	"Bodak Yellow"	Cardi B
45	"I'm Upset"	Drake
46	"Trip"	Ella Mai
47	"Sky Walker"	Miguel featuring Travis Scott
48	"Outside Today"	YoungBoy Never Broke Again
49	"Chun-Li"	Nicki Minaj
50	"Changes"	XXXTentacion
51	"Powerglide"	Rae Sremmurd featuring Juicy J
52	"River"	Eminem featuring Ed Sheeran
53	"Apeshit"	The Carters
54	"New Freezer"	Rich the Kid featuring Kendrick Lamar
55	"All Girls Are the Same"	Juice Wrld
56	"I Love It"	Lil Pump and Kanye West
57	"Drip Too Hard"	Lil Baby and Gunna
58	"The Way Life Goes"	Lil Uzi Vert featuring Nicki Minaj
59	"Mo Bamba"	Sheck Wes
60	"Japan"	Famous Dex
61	"Ring"	Cardi B featuring Kehlani
62	"Candy Paint"	Post Malone
63	"Rubbin Off the Paint"	YBN Nahmir
64	"Pick It Up"	Famous Dex featuring ASAP Rocky
65	"Roll in Peace"	Kodak Black featuring XXXTentacion
66	"Young Dumb & Broke"	Khalid
67	"Medicine"	Queen Naija
68	"KOD"	J. Cole
69	"Bank Account"	21 Savage
70	"Ball for Me"	Post Malone featuring Nicki Minaj
71	"Lucky You"	Eminem featuring Joyner Lucas
72	"Red Roses"	Lil Skies featuring Landon Cube
73	"Betrayed"	Lil Xan
74	"OTW"	Khalid, Ty Dolla Sign and 6lack
75	"Esskeetit"	Lil Pump
76	"Everyday"	Logic and Marshmello
77	"Narcos"	Migos
78	"Lie"	NF
79	"Pills & Automobiles"	Chris Brown featuring Yo Gotti, A Boogie wit da Hoodie and Kodak Black
80	"Zeze"	Kodak Black featuring Travis Scott and Offset
81	"Nowadays"	Lil Skies featuring Landon Cube
82	"That's On Me"	Yella Beezy
83	"Killshot"	Eminem
84	"Codeine Dreaming"	Kodak Black featuring Lil Wayne
85	"The Weekend"	SZA
86	"Wake Up in the Sky"	Gucci Mane, Bruno Mars and Kodak Black
87	"Drip"	Cardi B featuring Migos
88	"No Smoke"	YoungBoy Never Broke Again
89	"1-800-273-8255"	Logic featuring Alessia Cara and Khalid
90	"Smile (Living My Best Life)"	Lil Duval featuring Snoop Dogg and Ball Greezy
91	"Best Part"	Daniel Caesar and H.E.R.
92	"Kooda"	6ix9ine
93	"Workin Me"	Quavo
94	"Mob Ties"	Drake
95	"Sativa"	Jhené Aiko featuring Rae Sremmurd
96	"All Mine"	Kanye West
97	"Dangerous"	Meek Mill featuring Jeremih and PnB Rock
98	"Stargazing"	Travis Scott
99	"Uproar"	Lil Wayne
100	"Fuck Love"	XXXTentacion featuring Trippie Redd

== See also ==
- 2018 in music
- Billboard Year-End Hot 100 singles of 2018
- Billboard Year-End Hot Rap Songs of 2018
- List of number-one R&B/hip-hop songs of 2018 (U.S.)
