= List of Billboard Hot 100 top-ten singles in 2018 =

This is a list of singles that charted in the top ten of the Billboard Hot 100, an all-genre singles chart, in 2018.

== Top-ten singles ==
Key

- ↑ – indicates single's top 10 entry was also its Hot 100 debut
- (#) – 2018 year-end top 10 single position and rank
- The "weeks in top ten" column reflects each song's entire chart life, not just its run during 2018.

List of Billboard Hot 100 top ten singles that peaked in 2018
Top ten entry date	Single	Artist(s)	Peak	Peak date	Weeks in top ten	Ref.
Singles from 2017
November 11	"Havana" (#4)	Camila Cabello featuring Young Thug	1	January 27	23	
December 16	"No Limit"	G-Eazy featuring ASAP Rocky and Cardi B	4	January 6	9	
December 23	"Bad at Love"	Halsey	5	January 27	10	
Singles from 2018
January 20	"Finesse"	Bruno Mars and Cardi B	3	January 20	14	
January 20	"Filthy" ↑	Justin Timberlake	9	January 20	1	
January 27	"New Rules"	Dua Lipa	6	February 17	5	
February 3	"God's Plan" (#1) ↑	Drake	1	February 3	26	
February 3	"Diplomatic Immunity" ↑	Drake	7	February 3	1	
February 10	"Say Something" ↑	Justin Timberlake featuring Chris Stapleton	9	February 10	1	
February 17	"Pray for Me"^{[C]} ↑	The Weeknd and Kendrick Lamar	7	February 17	6	
February 17	"Stir Fry"^{[D]}	Migos	8	February 17	4	
February 17	"Meant to Be" (#3) ^{[J]}^{[L]}	Bebe Rexha and Florida Georgia Line	2	March 31	19	
February 24	"Look Alive"^{[F]} ↑	BlocBoy JB featuring Drake	5	March 3	13	
February 24	"All the Stars"^{[E]}	Kendrick Lamar and SZA	7	March 3	4	
March 10	"Psycho" (#6) ^{[M]} ↑	Post Malone featuring Ty Dolla Sign	1	June 16	21	
March 17	"The Middle" (#8)	Zedd, Maren Morris and Grey	5	April 28	16	
March 31	"Sad!"^{[K]}	XXXTentacion	1	June 30	6	
March 31	"Freaky Friday" ↑	Lil Dicky featuring Chris Brown	8	April 7	5	
April 14	"Call Out My Name" ↑	The Weeknd	4	April 14	1	
April 14	"Walk It Talk It"	Migos featuring Drake	10	April 14	1	
April 21	"Nice for What" ↑	Drake	1	April 21	17	
April 21	"I Like It" (#7) ^{[I]}^{[R]} ↑	Cardi B, Bad Bunny and J Balvin	1	July 7	21	
April 28	"Chun-Li"	Nicki Minaj	10	April 28	1	
May 5	"No Tears Left to Cry"^{[J]}^{[M]}^{[P]} ↑	Ariana Grande	3	May 5	12	
May 5	"ATM" ↑	J. Cole	6	May 5	1	
May 5	"Kevin's Heart" ↑	J. Cole	8	May 5	1	
May 5	"KOD" ↑	J. Cole	10	May 5	1	
May 12	"Never Be the Same"	Camila Cabello	6	May 12	3	
May 12	"Better Now"^{[N]} ↑	Post Malone	3	October 6	19	
May 19	"This Is America" ↑	Childish Gambino	1	May 19	5	
June 2	"Yes Indeed"	Lil Baby and Drake	6	June 2	2	
June 2	"Boo'd Up"^{[M]}	Ella Mai	5	July 21	12	
June 2	"Fake Love" ↑	BTS	10	June 2	1	
June 16	"Girls Like You"^{[U]} (#10)	Maroon 5 featuring Cardi B	1	September 29	33	
June 16	"Yikes" ↑	Kanye West	8	June 16	1	
June 16	"Lucid Dreams"^{[M]}	Juice Wrld	2	October 6	26	
July 14	"Nonstop" ↑	Drake	2	July 14	1	
July 14	"In My Feelings" (#9) ↑	Drake	1	July 21	14	
July 14	"I'm Upset"	Drake	7	July 14	1	
July 14	"Emotionless" ↑	Drake	8	July 14	1	
July 14	"Don't Matter to Me" ↑	Drake featuring Michael Jackson	9	July 14	1	
August 4	"Fefe"^{[R]} ↑	6ix9ine featuring Nicki Minaj and Murda Beatz	3	August 11	11	
August 4	"Taste"	Tyga featuring Offset	8	August 25	8	
August 11	"No Brainer"^{[O]} ↑	DJ Khaled featuring Justin Bieber, Chance the Rapper and Quavo	5	August 11	2	
August 18	"Sicko Mode" ↑	Travis Scott	1	December 8	32	
August 18	"Stargazing" ↑	Travis Scott	8	August 18	1	
September 1	"God Is a Woman"	Ariana Grande	8	September 1	2	
September 8	"Love Lies"^{[Q]}^{[S]}	Khalid and Normani	9	September 8	3	
September 15	"Lucky You" ↑	Eminem featuring Joyner Lucas	6	September 15	1	
September 15	"The Ringer" ↑	Eminem	8	September 15	1	
September 22	"I Love It" ↑	Kanye West and Lil Pump	6	September 22	3	
September 29	"Killshot" ↑	Eminem	3	September 29	2	
September 29	"Youngblood"	5 Seconds of Summer	7	October 20	7	
October 13	"Mona Lisa" ↑	Lil Wayne featuring Kendrick Lamar	2	October 13	1	
October 13	"Don't Cry" ↑	Lil Wayne featuring XXXTentacion	5	October 13	1	
October 13	"Uproar" ↑	Lil Wayne	7	October 13	1	
October 13	"Let It Fly" ↑	Lil Wayne featuring Travis Scott	10	October 13	1	
October 20	"Drip Too Hard"	Lil Baby and Gunna	4	October 20	15	
October 27	"Zeze" ↑	Kodak Black featuring Travis Scott and Offset	2	October 27	13	
October 27	"Mia" ↑	Bad Bunny featuring Drake	5	October 27	1	
November 10	"Mo Bamba"	Sheck Wes	6	December 8	6	
November 17	"Thank U, Next" ↑	Ariana Grande	1	November 17	17	
December 15	"Going Bad" ↑	Meek Mill featuring Drake	6	December 15	2	

=== 2017 peaks ===
List of Billboard Hot 100 top ten singles in 2018 that peaked in 2017
Top ten entry date	Single	Artist(s)	Peak	Peak date	Weeks in top ten	Ref.
August 26	"Bodak Yellow"^{[A]}	Cardi B	1	October 7	20	
September 30	"Too Good at Goodbyes" ↑	Sam Smith	4	November 25	16	
October 7	"Rockstar" (#5) ^{[G]} ↑	Post Malone featuring 21 Savage	1	October 28	25	
October 21	"Thunder"	Imagine Dragons	4	December 2	18	
November 11	"Perfect" (#2) ^{[H]}	Ed Sheeran^{1}	1	December 23	27	
November 18	"Gucci Gang"	Lil Pump	3	December 2	9	
December 30	"MotorSport"^{[B]}	Migos, Nicki Minaj, and Cardi B	6	December 30	7	

=== 2019 peaks ===
List of Billboard Hot 100 top ten singles in 2017 and 2018 that peaked in 2019
Top ten entry date	Single	Artist(s)	Peak	Peak date	Weeks in top ten	Ref.
October 20	"Shallow"	Lady Gaga and Bradley Cooper	1	March 9	7	
October 20	"Happier"	Marshmello and Bastille	2	February 16	27	
November 3	"Sunflower"^{[U]} ↑	Post Malone and Swae Lee	1	January 19	33	
November 10	"Without Me"	Halsey	1	January 12	29	
November 24	"High Hopes"	Panic! at the Disco	4	January 26	15	

=== Holiday season ===
Holiday title first making the Billboard Hot 100 top ten during the 2018–19 holiday season
Top ten entry date	Single	Artist(s)	Peak	Peak date	Weeks in top ten	Ref.
December 29, 2018	"It's the Most Wonderful Time of the Year"	Andy Williams	5	January 2, 2021	24	

Holiday title first making the Billboard Hot 100 top ten during the 2017–18 holiday season
Top ten entry date	Single	Artist(s)	Peak	Peak date	Weeks in top ten	Ref.
December 30, 2017	"All I Want for Christmas Is You"^{[T]}	Mariah Carey	1	December 21, 2019	43	

== Notes ==
^{1} The duet version of "Perfect", by Sheeran and Beyoncé, was the billing on the chart from December 23, 2017 to January 13, 2018.

^{A} The single re-entered the top ten on the week ending January 6, 2018.
^{B} The single re-entered the top ten on the week ending February 10, 2018.
^{C} The single re-entered the top ten on the week ending March 3, 2018.
^{D} The single re-entered the top ten on the week ending March 17, 2018.
^{E} The single re-entered the top ten on the week ending March 24, 2018.
^{F} The single re-entered the top ten on the week ending April 7, 2018.
^{G} The single re-entered the top ten on the week ending May 12, 2018.
^{H} The single re-entered the top ten on the week ending May 19, 2018.
^{I} The single re-entered the top ten on the week ending June 9, 2018.
^{J} The single re-entered the top ten on the week ending June 23, 2018.
^{K} The single re-entered the top ten on the week ending June 30, 2018.
^{L} The single re-entered the top ten on the week ending July 7, 2018.
^{M} The single re-entered the top ten on the week ending July 21, 2018.
^{N} The single re-entered the top ten on the week ending July 28, 2018.
^{O} The single re-entered the top ten on the week ending August 25, 2018.
^{P} The single re-entered the top ten on the week ending September 1, 2018.
^{Q} The single re-entered the top ten on the week ending September 22, 2018.
^{R} The single re-entered the top ten on the week ending October 20, 2018.
^{S} The single re-entered the top ten on the week ending November 3, 2018.
^{T} The single re-entered the top ten on the week ending December 15, 2018.
^{U} The single re-entered the top ten on the week ending December 22, 2018.
^{V} The single re-entered the top ten on the week ending January 4, 2020.

== Artists with most top-ten songs ==
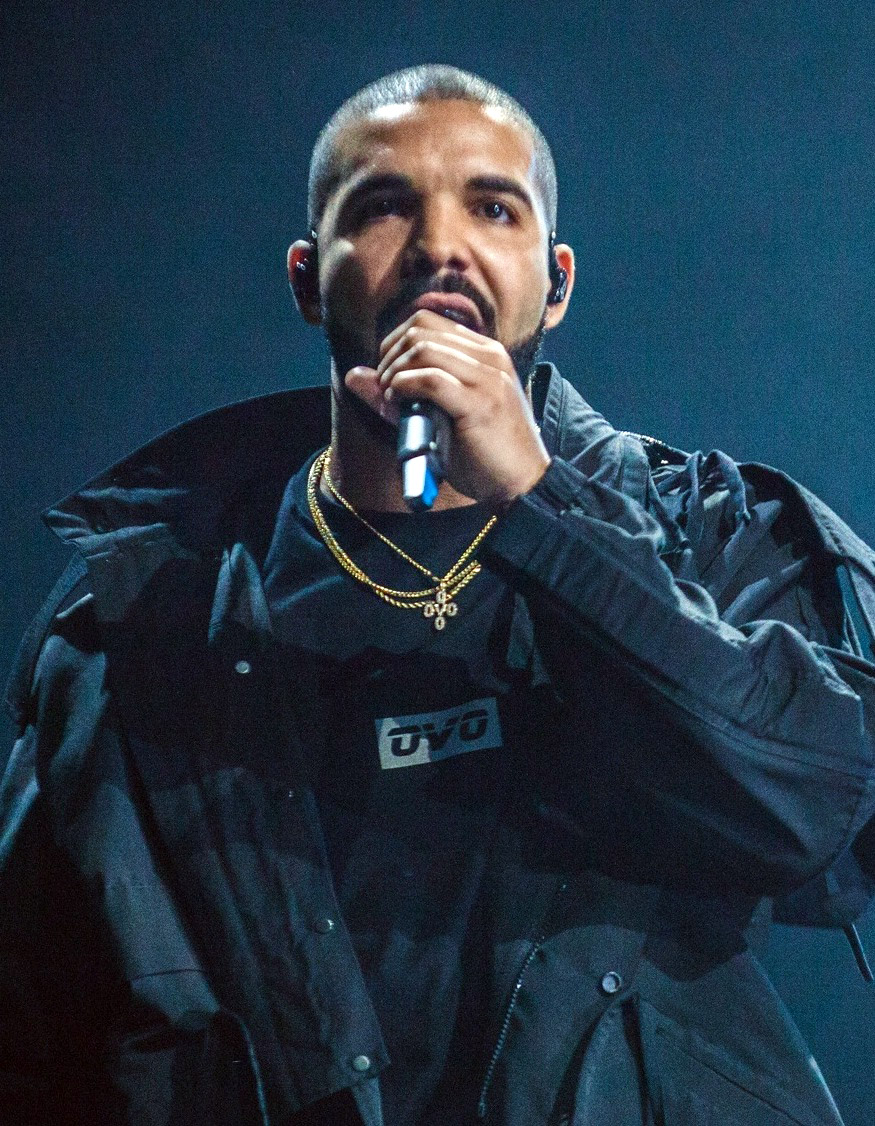
Drake (pictured) broke the Beatles' record for the most top 10 hits in a calendar year in 2018 with thirteen, seven of which are from his fifth studio album Scorpion.

List of artists by total songs peaking in the top-ten
Artist	Numbers of songs
Drake	13
Cardi B	6
Lil Wayne	4
Post Malone	4
Travis Scott	4
Ariana Grande	3
Eminem	3
J. Cole	3
Kendrick Lamar	3
Migos	3
Nicki Minaj	3
Bad Bunny	2
Camila Cabello	2
Halsey	2
Justin Timberlake	2
Kanye West	2
Lil Pump	2
Offset	2
The Weeknd	2
XXXTentacion	2

== See also ==
- 2018 in American music
- List of Billboard Hot 100 number ones of 2018
- Billboard Year-End Hot 100 singles of 2018
