= Billboard Year-End Hot Rap Songs of 2018 =

American music chart

This is a list of Billboard magazine's Top Hot Rap Songs of 2018.

No.	Title	Artist(s)
1	"God's Plan"	Drake
2	"I Like It"	Cardi B, Bad Bunny, and J Balvin
3	"In My Feelings"	Drake
4	"Psycho"	Post Malone featuring Ty Dolla Sign
5	"Nice for What"	Drake
6	"Rockstar"	Post Malone featuring 21 Savage
7	"Lucid Dreams"	Juice Wrld
8	"Better Now"	Post Malone
9	"Look Alive"	BlocBoy JB featuring Drake
10	"Yes Indeed"	Lil Baby and Drake
11	"Sad!"	XXXTentacion
12	"Taste"	Tyga featuring Offset
13	"Fefe"	6ix9ine featuring Nicki Minaj and Murda Beatz
14	"MotorSport"	Migos featuring Nicki Minaj and Cardi B
15	"Let You Down"	NF
16	"No Limit"	G-Eazy featuring ASAP Rocky and Cardi B
17	"Gucci Gang"	Lil Pump
18	"Sicko Mode"	Travis Scott
19	"Him & I"	G-Eazy and Halsey
20	"Walk It Talk It"	Migos featuring Drake
21	"Stir Fry"	Migos
22	"Nonstop"	Drake
23	"I Fall Apart"	Post Malone
24	"Gummo"	6ix9ine
25	"Ric Flair Drip"	Offset and Metro Boomin
26	"This Is America"	Childish Gambino
27	"Plug Walk"	Rich the Kid
28	"Be Careful"	Cardi B
29	"Love"	Kendrick Lamar
30	"Bartier Cardi"	Cardi B featuring 21 Savage
31	"Big Bank"	YG featuring 2 Chainz, Big Sean and Nicki Minaj
32	"Plain Jane"	ASAP Ferg featuring Nicki Minaj
33	"I Get the Bag"	Gucci Mane featuring Migos
34	"Bodak Yellow"	Cardi B
35	"Moonlight"	XXXTentacion
36	"Lemon"	N.E.R.D. and Rihanna
37	"I'm Upset"	Drake
38	"King's Dead"	Jay Rock, Kendrick Lamar, Future and James Blake
39	"Drip Too Hard"	Lil Baby and Gunna
40	"The Way Life Goes"	Lil Uzi Vert featuring Nicki Minaj
41	"Outside Today"	YoungBoy Never Broke Again
42	"I Love It"	Lil Pump and Kanye West
43	"Chun-Li"	Nicki Minaj
44	"River"	Eminem featuring Ed Sheeran
45	"Powerglide"	Rae Sremmurd featuring Juicy J
46	"Apeshit"	The Carters
47	"Roll in Peace"	Kodak Black featuring XXXTentacion
48	"Mo Bamba"	Sheck Wes
49	"Gold Old Days"	Macklemore featuring Kesha
50	"Bank Account"	21 Savage

== See also ==
- 2018 in music
- Billboard Year-End Hot 100 singles of 2018
- Billboard Year-End Hot R&B/Hip-Hop Songs of 2018
- List of Billboard number-one rap singles of 2018
