= Billboard Year-End Hot 100 singles of 2018 =

Ranking of recorded music

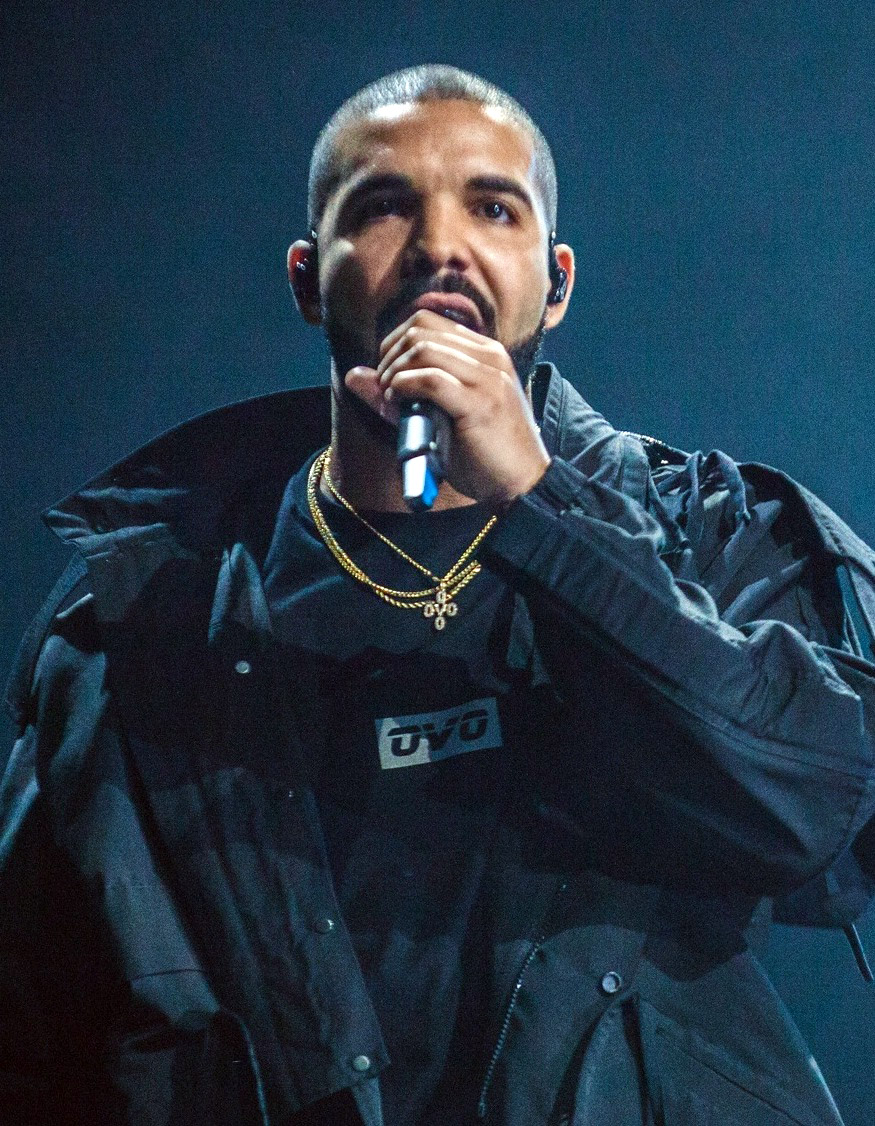
"God's Plan" by Drake came in at number one, spending a total of eleven consecutive weeks at the top position of the Billboard Hot 100 throughout 2018.

The Billboard Hot 100 is a chart that ranks the best-performing singles of the United States. Its data, published by Billboard magazine and compiled by Nielsen SoundScan, is based collectively on each single's weekly physical and digital sales, as well as airplay and streaming. At the end of a year, Billboard will publish an annual list of the 100 most successful songs throughout that year on the Hot 100 chart based on the information. For 2018, the list was published on December 4, calculated with data from December 2, 2017 to November 17, 2018.

The top Hot 100 artist of 2018 was Drake, who placed eight songs on the list, including the number-one song of the year, "God's Plan". Rapper Cardi B also placed eight songs on the list.

The 2018 Billboard Year End list is also notable for being one of five Billboard Year-End lists that featured 14 songs that appeared in the previous year (in this case 2017's) repeat on this list. With the highest being Camila Cabello's "Havana", barely making it onto 2017's list at number 96 and repeating much higher at number 4 in 2018's. Only four more year-end list would repeat the same feat, that being 1997, 2010, 2016 and 2022.

== Year-end list ==
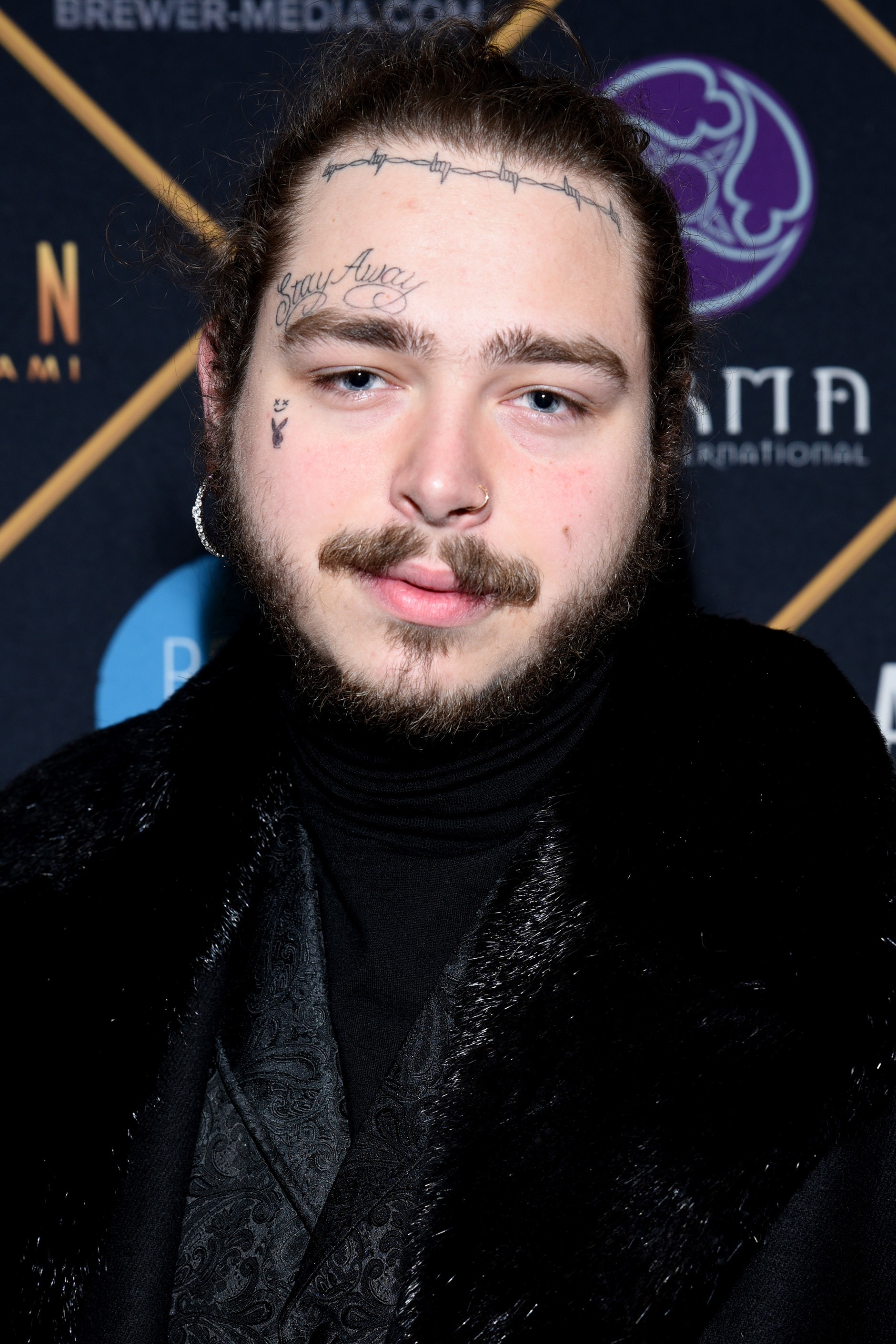
American rapper and singer Post Malone has four songs in the top 40 with "Rockstar" (featuring 21 Savage) at number 5, "Psycho" (featuring Ty Dolla Sign) at number 6, "Better Now" at number 13, and "I Fall Apart" at number 39.

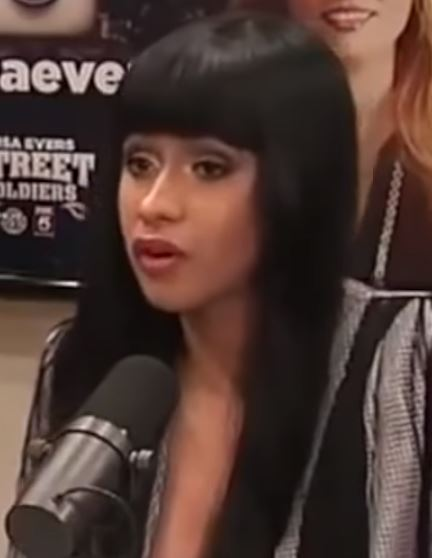
American rapper Cardi B charted eight songs on the list, tying Drake for the artist with the most songs on the list. In the top 10, two of her number-one hits "I Like It" (with Bad Bunny and J Balvin) and "Girls Like You" (Maroon 5 featuring Cardi B) are at number 7 and number 10 respectively.

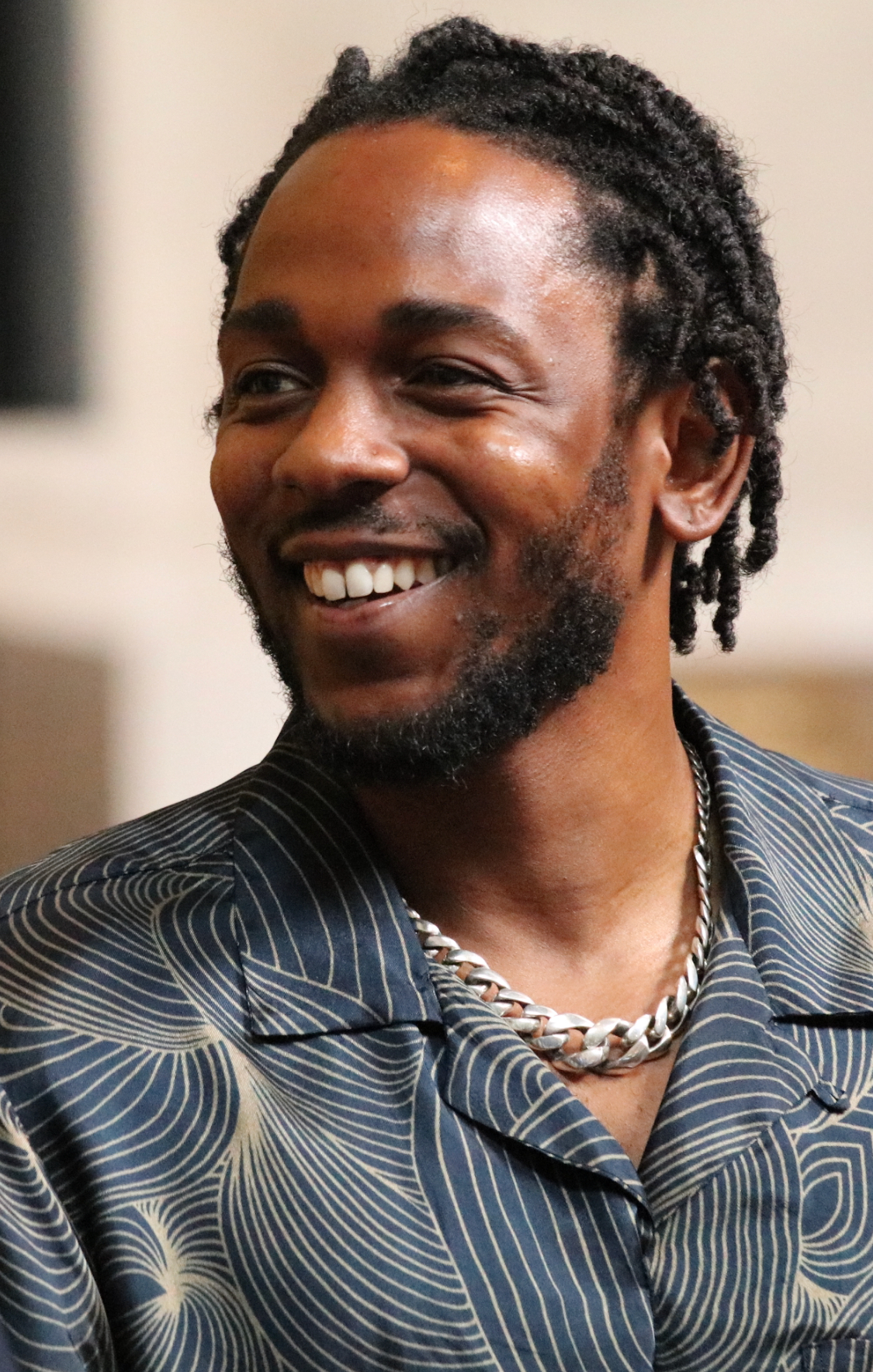
American rapper Kendrick Lamar has four songs on the list, three of which are from his soundtrack for the film Black Panther.

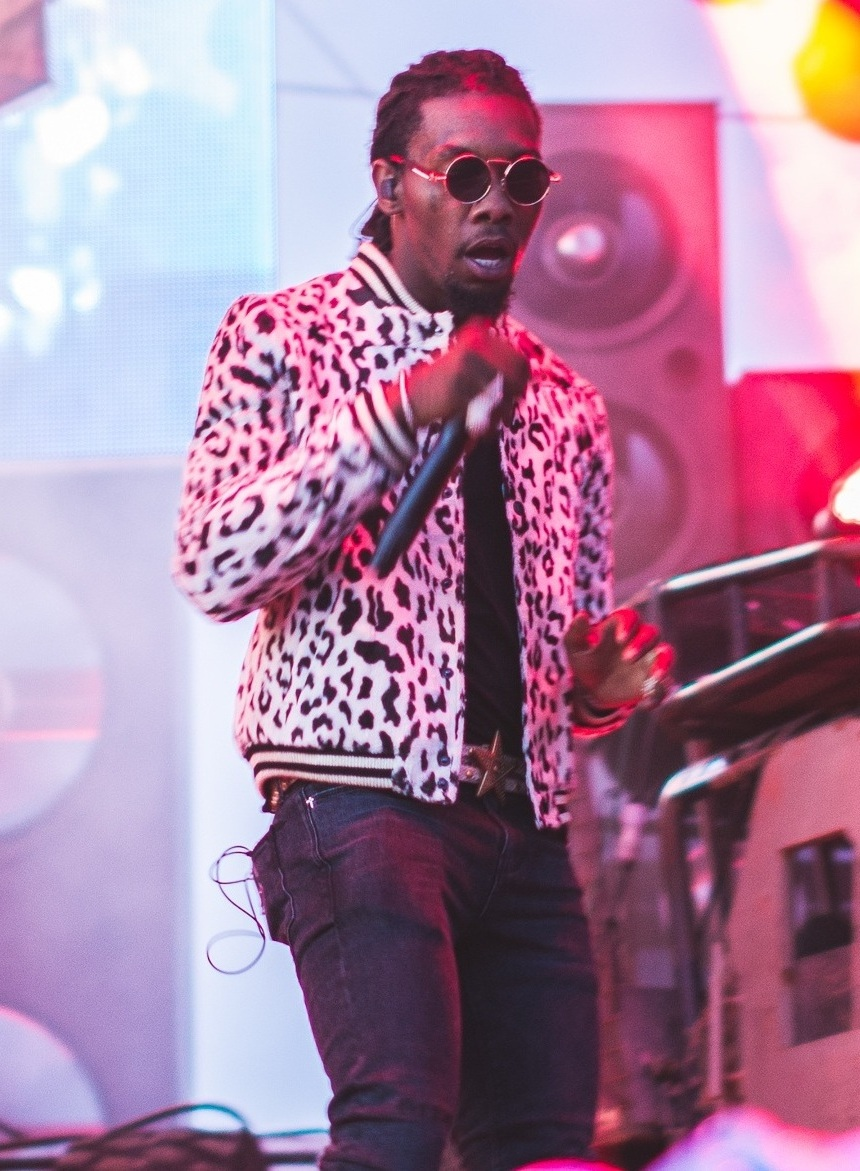
Migos' member Offset (pictured) has five songs on the list, three of which are with the group (excluding "I Get the Bag"), and the other two rank within the top 40, "Taste" with Tyga and "Ric Flair Drip" with Metro Boomin.

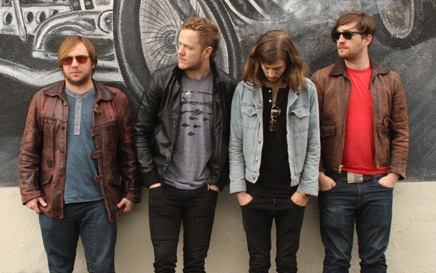
American pop rock band Imagine Dragons have 4 songs on the list, three of which came from their third studio album Evolve ("Thunder" at number 22, "Whatever It Takes" at number 37, and "Believer" at number 100) and one of which came from their 4th studio album Origins ("Natural" at number 69.)

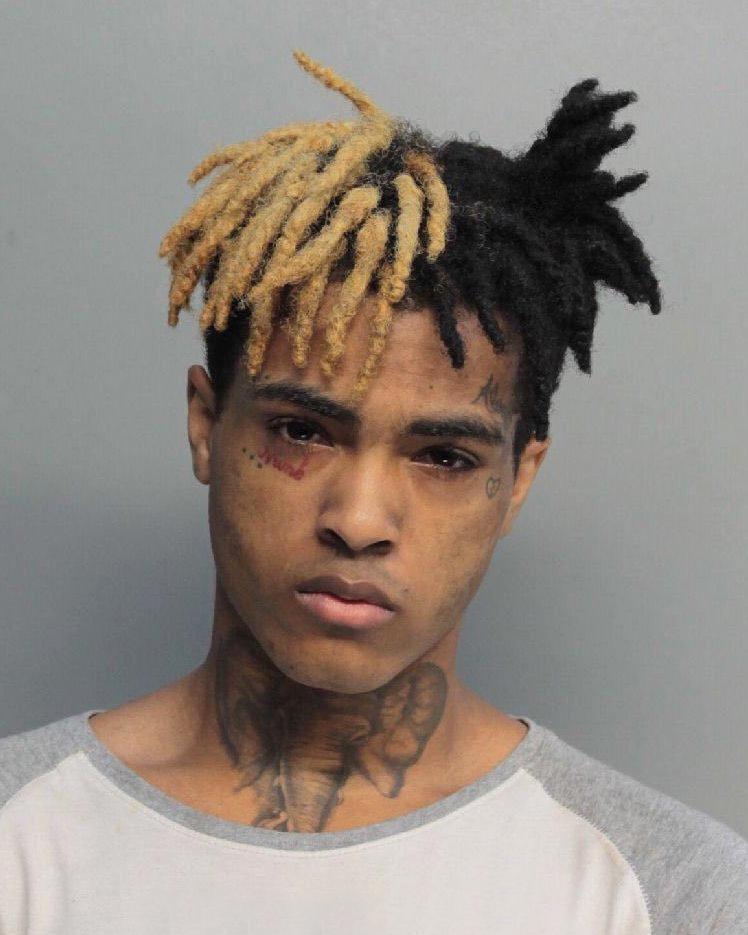
American rapper XXXTentacion charted three songs on the list with his singles, "Sad!" at number 17, "Moonlight" at number 88, and "Changes" at number 94.

List of songs on Billboard's 2018 Year-End Hot 100 chart
No.	Title	Artist(s)
1	"God's Plan"	Drake
2	"Perfect"	Ed Sheeran
3	"Meant to Be"	Bebe Rexha featuring Florida Georgia Line
4	"Havana"	Camila Cabello featuring Young Thug
5	"Rockstar"	Post Malone featuring 21 Savage
6	"Psycho"	Post Malone featuring Ty Dolla Sign
7	"I Like It"	Cardi B, Bad Bunny and J Balvin
8	"The Middle"	Zedd, Maren Morris and Grey
9	"In My Feelings"	Drake
10	"Girls Like You"	Maroon 5 featuring Cardi B
11	"Nice for What"	Drake
12	"Lucid Dreams"	Juice Wrld
13	"Better Now"	Post Malone
14	"Finesse"	Bruno Mars featuring Cardi B
15	"Boo'd Up"	Ella Mai
16	"New Rules"	Dua Lipa
17	"Sad!"	XXXTentacion
18	"Never Be the Same"	Camila Cabello
19	"Love Lies"	Khalid and Normani
20	"No Tears Left to Cry"	Ariana Grande
21	"Mine"	Bazzi
22	"Thunder"	Imagine Dragons
23	"Look Alive"	BlocBoy JB featuring Drake
24	"Delicate"	Taylor Swift
25	"Yes Indeed"	Lil Baby and Drake
26	"Friends"	Marshmello and Anne-Marie
27	"Bad at Love"	Halsey
28	"Taste"	Tyga featuring Offset
29	"Let You Down"	NF
30	"No Limit"	G-Eazy featuring ASAP Rocky and Cardi B
31	"Fefe"	6ix9ine featuring Nicki Minaj and Murda Beatz
32	"Tequila"	Dan + Shay
33	"Feel It Still"	Portugal. The Man
34	"MotorSport"	Migos, Nicki Minaj and Cardi B
35	"I Like Me Better"	Lauv
36	"Youngblood"	5 Seconds of Summer
37	"Whatever It Takes"	Imagine Dragons
38	"Ric Flair Drip"	Offset and Metro Boomin
39	"I Fall Apart"	Post Malone
40	"Pray for Me"	The Weeknd and Kendrick Lamar
41	"Back to You"	Selena Gomez
42	"Sicko Mode"	Travis Scott
43	"Walk It Talk It"	Migos featuring Drake
44	"Gucci Gang"	Lil Pump
45	"Him & I"	G-Eazy and Halsey
46	"In My Blood"	Shawn Mendes
47	"All the Stars"	Kendrick Lamar and SZA
48	"Stir Fry"	Migos
49	"Too Good at Goodbyes"	Sam Smith
50	"Love"	Kendrick Lamar featuring Zacari
51	"This Is America"	Childish Gambino
52	"Nonstop"	Drake
53	"Heaven"	Kane Brown
54	"Bodak Yellow"	Cardi B
55	"Freaky Friday"	Lil Dicky featuring Chris Brown
56	"Gummo"	6ix9ine
57	"Plug Walk"	Rich the Kid
58	"Wait"	Maroon 5
59	"Be Careful"	Cardi B
60	"Wolves"	Selena Gomez and Marshmello
61	"Bartier Cardi"	Cardi B featuring 21 Savage
62	"God Is a Woman"	Ariana Grande
63	"Big Bank"	YG featuring 2 Chainz, Nicki Minaj and Big Sean
64	"Sorry Not Sorry"	Demi Lovato
65	"How Long"	Charlie Puth
66	"Lights Down Low"	Max featuring Gnash
67	"Young Dumb & Broke"	Khalid
68	"One Kiss"	Calvin Harris and Dua Lipa
69	"Natural"	Imagine Dragons
70	"You Make It Easy"	Jason Aldean
71	"Shape of You"	Ed Sheeran
72	"I Get the Bag"	Gucci Mane featuring Migos
73	"No Brainer"	DJ Khaled featuring Justin Bieber, Chance the Rapper and Quavo
74	"Plain Jane"	ASAP Ferg featuring Nicki Minaj
75	"Sky Walker"	Miguel featuring Travis Scott
76	"Marry Me"	Thomas Rhett
77	"Eastside"	Benny Blanco, Halsey and Khalid
78	"Call Out My Name"	The Weeknd
79	"King's Dead"	Jay Rock, Kendrick Lamar, Future and James Blake
80	"Happier"	Marshmello and Bastille
81	"Te Boté"	Nio García, Darell and Casper Mágico featuring Bad Bunny, Nicky Jam and Ozuna
82	"Simple"	Florida Georgia Line
83	"Lemon"	N.E.R.D and Rihanna
84	"1-800-273-8255"	Logic featuring Alessia Cara and Khalid
85	"Say Something"	Justin Timberlake featuring Chris Stapleton
86	"I'm Upset"	Drake
87	"Get Along"	Kenny Chesney
88	"Moonlight"	XXXTentacion
89	"What Lovers Do"	Maroon 5 featuring SZA
90	"X"	Nicky Jam and J Balvin
91	"Outside Today"	YoungBoy Never Broke Again
92	"Trip"	Ella Mai
93	"Dura"	Daddy Yankee
94	"Changes"	XXXTentacion
95	"Mercy"	Brett Young
96	"One Number Away"	Luke Combs
97	"Powerglide"	Rae Sremmurd featuring Juicy J
98	"IDGAF"	Dua Lipa
99	"Mi Gente"	J Balvin and Willy William featuring Beyoncé
100	"Believer"	Imagine Dragons

== See also ==
- 2018 in American music
- Billboard Year-End Hot R&B/Hip-Hop Songs of 2018
- Billboard Year-End Hot Rap Songs of 2018
- List of Billboard Hot 100 number ones of 2018
- List of Billboard Hot 100 top-ten singles in 2018
