= List of number-one R&B/hip-hop songs of 2018 (U.S.) =

This page lists the songs that reached number-one on the overall Hot R&B/Hip-Hop Songs chart, the R&B Songs chart (which was created in 2012), the Hot Rap Songs chart, the R&B/Hip-Hop Airplay chart, and the Mainstream R&B/Hip-Hop chart in 2018. The R&B Songs and Rap Songs charts partly serve as distillations of the overall R&B/Hip-Hop Songs chart.

== List of number ones ==
Key
†	Indicates best-charting R&B/Hip-Hop, R&B, Rap and Airplay singles of 2018

Issue date	R&B/Hip-Hop Songs	Artist	R&B Songs	Artist	Rap Songs	Artist	R&B/Hip-Hop Airplay	Artist	Refs.
January 3	"Rockstar"	Post Malone featuring 21 Savage	"The Weekend"	SZA	"Rockstar"	Post Malone featuring 21 Savage	"No Limit	G-Eazy featuring ASAP Rocky and Cardi B	
January 6	"Rockstar"	Post Malone featuring 21 Savage	"Young Dumb & Broke"	Khalid	"Rockstar"	Post Malone featuring 21 Savage	"Love"	Kendrick Lamar featuring Zacari	
January 13	"Rockstar"	Post Malone featuring 21 Savage	"Young Dumb & Broke"	Khalid	"Rockstar"	Post Malone featuring 21 Savage	"No Limit"	G-Eazy featuring ASAP Rocky and Cardi B	
January 20	"Finesse"	Bruno Mars featuring Cardi B	"Finesse" †	Bruno Mars featuring Cardi B	"Rockstar"	Post Malone featuring 21 Savage	"No Limit"	G-Eazy featuring ASAP Rocky and Cardi B	
January 27	"Rockstar"	Post Malone featuring 21 Savage	"Finesse" †	Bruno Mars featuring Cardi B	"Rockstar"	Post Malone featuring 21 Savage	"Love"	Kendrick Lamar featuring Zacari	
February 3	"God's Plan" †	Drake	"Finesse" †	Bruno Mars featuring Cardi B	"God's Plan" †	Drake	"No Limit"	G-Eazy featuring ASAP Rocky and Cardi B	
February 10	"God's Plan" †	Drake	"Finesse" †	Bruno Mars featuring Cardi B	"God's Plan" †	Drake	"Love"	Kendrick Lamar featuring Zacari	
February 17	"God's Plan" †	Drake	"Finesse" †	Bruno Mars featuring Cardi B	"God's Plan" †	Drake	"Love"	Kendrick Lamar featuring Zacari	
February 24	"God's Plan" †	Drake	"Finesse" †	Bruno Mars featuring Cardi B	"God's Plan" †	Drake	"Love"	Kendrick Lamar featuring Zacari	
March 3	"God's Plan" †	Drake	"Finesse" †	Bruno Mars featuring Cardi B	"God's Plan" †	Drake	"God's Plan"	Drake	
March 10	"God's Plan" †	Drake	"Finesse" †	Bruno Mars featuring Cardi B	"God's Plan" †	Drake	"God's Plan"	Drake	
March 17	"God's Plan" †	Drake	"Finesse" †	Bruno Mars featuring Cardi B	"God's Plan" †	Drake	"God's Plan"	Drake	
March 24	"God's Plan" †	Drake	"Finesse" †	Bruno Mars featuring Cardi B	"God's Plan" †	Drake	"God's Plan"	Drake	
March 31	"God's Plan" †	Drake	"Finesse" †	Bruno Mars featuring Cardi B	"God's Plan" †	Drake	"God's Plan"	Drake	
April 7	"God's Plan" †	Drake	"Finesse" †	Bruno Mars featuring Cardi B	"God's Plan" †	Drake	"God's Plan"	Drake	
April 14	"God's Plan" †	Drake	"Call Out My Name"	The Weeknd	"God's Plan" †	Drake	"God's Plan"	Drake	
April 21	"Nice for What"	Drake	"Freaky Friday"	Lil Dicky featuring Chris Brown	"Nice for What"	Drake	"God's Plan"	Drake	
April 28	"Nice for What"	Drake	"Freaky Friday"	Lil Dicky featuring Chris Brown	"Nice for What"	Drake	"God's Plan"	Drake	
May 5	"Nice for What"	Drake	"Freaky Friday"	Lil Dicky featuring Chris Brown	"Nice for What"	Drake	"Look Alive"	BlocBoy JB featuring Drake	
May 12	"Nice for What"	Drake	"Freaky Friday"	Lil Dicky featuring Chris Brown	"Nice for What"	Drake	"Look Alive"	BlocBoy JB featuring Drake	
May 19	"This Is America"	Childish Gambino	"Freaky Friday"	Lil Dicky featuring Chris Brown	"This Is America"	Childish Gambino	"Nice for What"	Drake	
May 26	"This Is America"	Childish Gambino	"Boo'd Up"	Ella Mai	"This Is America"	Childish Gambino	"Nice for What"	Drake	
June 2	"Nice for What"	Drake	"Boo'd Up"	Ella Mai	"Nice for What"	Drake	"Nice for What"	Drake	
June 9	"Nice for What"	Drake	"Boo'd Up"	Ella Mai	"Nice for What"	Drake	"Nice for What"	Drake	
June 16	"Psycho"	Post Malone featuring Ty Dolla Sign	"Boo'd Up"	Ella Mai	"Psycho"	Post Malone featuring Ty Dolla Sign	"Nice for What"	Drake	
June 23	"Nice for What"	Drake	"Boo'd Up"	Ella Mai	"Nice for What"	Drake	"Boo'd Up" †	Ella Mai	
June 30	"Sad!"	XXXTentacion	"Boo'd Up"	Ella Mai	"Sad!"	XXXTentacion	"Boo'd Up" †	Ella Mai	
July 7	"I Like It"	Cardi B, Bad Bunny and J Balvin	"Boo'd Up"	Ella Mai	"I Like It"	Cardi B, Bad Bunny and J Balvin	"Boo'd Up" †	Ella Mai	
July 14	"Nice for What"	Drake	"Don't Matter to Me"	Drake featuring Michael Jackson	"Nice for What"	Drake	"Boo'd Up" †	Ella Mai	
July 21	"In My Feelings"	Drake	"Boo'd Up"	Ella Mai	"In My Feelings"	Drake	"Boo'd Up" †	Ella Mai	
July 28	"In My Feelings"	Drake	"Boo'd Up"	Ella Mai	"In My Feelings"	Drake	"Boo'd Up" †	Ella Mai	
August 4	"In My Feelings"	Drake	"Boo'd Up"	Ella Mai	"In My Feelings"	Drake	"Boo'd Up" †	Ella Mai	
August 11	"In My Feelings"	Drake	"No Brainer"	DJ Khaled featuring Justin Bieber, Chance the Rapper and Quavo	"In My Feelings"	Drake	"Boo'd Up" †	Ella Mai	
August 18	"In My Feelings"	Drake	"Boo'd Up"	Ella Mai	"In My Feelings"	Drake	"Boo'd Up" †	Ella Mai	
August 25	"In My Feelings"	Drake	"Boo'd Up"	Ella Mai	"In My Feelings"	Drake	"Boo'd Up" †	Ella Mai	
September 1	"In My Feelings"	Drake	"No Brainer"	DJ Khaled featuring Justin Bieber, Chance the Rapper and Quavo	"In My Feelings"	Drake	"Boo'd Up" †	Ella Mai	
September 8	"In My Feelings"	Drake	"No Brainer"	DJ Khaled featuring Justin Bieber, Chance the Rapper and Quavo	"In My Feelings"	Drake	"Boo'd Up" †	Ella Mai	
September 15	"In My Feelings"	Drake	"Boo'd Up"	Ella Mai	"In My Feelings"	Drake	"Boo'd Up" †	Ella Mai	
September 22	"In My Feelings"	Drake	"No Brainer"	DJ Khaled featuring Justin Bieber, Chance the Rapper and Quavo	"In My Feelings"	Drake	"Boo'd Up" †	Ella Mai	
September 29	"In My Feelings"	Drake	"No Brainer"	DJ Khaled featuring Justin Bieber, Chance the Rapper and Quavo	"In My Feelings"	Drake	"Boo'd Up" †	Ella Mai	
October 6	"Lucid Dreams"	Juice Wrld	"No Brainer"	DJ Khaled featuring Justin Bieber, Chance the Rapper and Quavo	"Lucid Dreams"	Juice Wrld	"Boo'd Up" †	Ella Mai	
October 13	"Mona Lisa"	Lil Wayne featuring Kendrick Lamar	"Trip"	Ella Mai	"Mona Lisa"	Lil Wayne featuring Kendrick Lamar	"Smile (Living My Best Life)"	Lil Duval featuring Snoop Dogg and Ball Greezy	
October 20	"Lucid Dreams"	Juice Wrld	"Trip"	Ella Mai	"Lucid Dreams"	Juice Wrld	"Smile (Living My Best Life)"	Lil Duval featuring Snoop Dogg and Ball Greezy	
October 27	"Zeze"	Kodak Black featuring Travis Scott and Offset	"Trip"	Ella Mai	"Zeze"	Kodak Black featuring Travis Scott and Offset	"Smile (Living My Best Life)"	Lil Duval featuring Snoop Dogg and Ball Greezy	
November 3	"Sicko Mode"	Travis Scott	"Trip"	Ella Mai	"Sicko Mode"	Travis Scott	"Trip"	Ella Mai	
November 10	"Sicko Mode"	Travis Scott	"Trip"	Ella Mai	"Sicko Mode"	Travis Scott	"Trip"	Ella Mai	
November 17	"Sicko Mode"	Travis Scott	"Trip"	Ella Mai	"Sicko Mode"	Travis Scott	"Trip"	Ella Mai	
November 24	"Sicko Mode"	Travis Scott	"Trip"	Ella Mai	"Sicko Mode"	Travis Scott	"Trip"	Ella Mai	
December 1	"Sicko Mode"	Travis Scott	"Trip"	Ella Mai	"Sicko Mode"	Travis Scott	"Trip"	Ella Mai	
December 8	"Sicko Mode"	Travis Scott	"Trip"	Ella Mai	"Sicko Mode"	Travis Scott	"Trip"	Ella Mai	
December 15	"Sicko Mode"	Travis Scott	"Trip"	Ella Mai	"Sicko Mode"	Travis Scott	"Trip"	Ella Mai	
December 22	"Sicko Mode"	Travis Scott	"Trip"	Ella Mai	"Sicko Mode"	Travis Scott	"Trip"	Ella Mai	
December 29	"Sicko Mode"	Travis Scott	"Trip"	Ella Mai	"Sicko Mode"	Travis Scott	"Trip"	Ella Mai	

== See also ==
- Billboard Year-End Hot R&B/Hip-Hop Songs of 2018
- List of Billboard Hot 100 number-one singles of 2018
- List of Billboard number-one R&B/hip-hop albums of 2018
