= List of Billboard number-one R&B/hip-hop albums of 2018 =

This page lists the albums that reached number-one on the overall Top R&B/Hip-Hop Albums chart, the R&B Albums chart (which was re-created in 2013), and the Rap Albums chart in 2018. The R&B Albums and Rap Albums charts partly serve as distillations of the overall R&B/Hip-Hop Albums chart.

== List of number ones ==
Key
†	Indicates best-charting R&B/Hip-Hop, R&B and Rap albums of 2018

Issue date	R&B/Hip-Hop Albums	Artist(s)	R&B Albums	Artist(s)	Rap Albums	Artist(s)	Refs.
January 3	Revival	Eminem	Heartbreak on a Full Moon	Chris Brown	Revival	Eminem	
January 6	Huncho Jack, Jack Huncho	Travis Scott and Quavo	American Teen †	Khalid	Huncho Jack, Jack Huncho	Travis Scott and Quavo	
January 13	The Beautiful & Damned	G-Eazy	American Teen †	Khalid	The Beautiful & Damned	G-Eazy	
January 20	The Beautiful & Damned	G-Eazy	24K Magic	Bruno Mars	The Beautiful & Damned	G-Eazy	
January 27	Stoney	Post Malone	24K Magic	Bruno Mars	Stoney	Post Malone	
February 3	Stoney	Post Malone	24K Magic	Bruno Mars	Stoney	Post Malone	
February 10	Culture II	Migos	24K Magic	Bruno Mars	Culture II	Migos	
February 17	Culture II	Migos	24K Magic	Bruno Mars	Culture II	Migos	
February 24	Black Panther: The Album	Soundtrack	24K Magic	Bruno Mars	Black Panther: The Album	Soundtrack	
March 3	Black Panther: The Album	Soundtrack	24K Magic	Bruno Mars	Black Panther: The Album	Soundtrack	
March 10	Black Panther: The Album	Soundtrack	24K Magic	Bruno Mars	Black Panther: The Album	Soundtrack	
March 17	Black Panther: The Album	Soundtrack	Memories Don't Die	Tory Lanez	Black Panther: The Album	Soundtrack	
March 24	Bobby Tarantino II	Logic	Memories Don't Die	Tory Lanez	Bobby Tarantino II	Logic	
March 31	?	XXXTentacion	American Teen †	Khalid	?	XXXTentacion	
April 7	?	XXXTentacion	24K Magic	Bruno Mars	?	XXXTentacion	
April 14	My Dear Melancholy,	The Weeknd	My Dear Melancholy,	The Weeknd	?	XXXTentacion	
April 21	Invasion of Privacy	Cardi B	My Dear Melancholy,	The Weeknd	Invasion of Privacy	Cardi B	
April 28	Invasion of Privacy	Cardi B	My Dear Melancholy,	The Weeknd	Invasion of Privacy	Cardi B	
May 5	KOD	J. Cole	My Dear Melancholy,	The Weeknd	KOD	J. Cole	
May 12	Beerbongs & Bentleys	Post Malone	Dirty Computer	Janelle Monáe	Beerbongs & Bentleys	Post Malone	
May 19	Beerbongs & Bentleys	Post Malone	Good Thing	Leon Bridges	Beerbongs & Bentleys	Post Malone	
May 26	Beerbongs & Bentleys	Post Malone	My Dear Melancholy,	The Weeknd	Beerbongs & Bentleys	Post Malone	
June 2	Beerbongs & Bentleys	Post Malone	American Teen †	Khalid	Beerbongs & Bentleys	Post Malone	
June 9	Beerbongs & Bentleys	Post Malone	American Teen †	Khalid	Beerbongs & Bentleys	Post Malone	
June 16	Ye	Kanye West	American Teen †	Khalid	Ye	Kanye West	
June 23	Kids See Ghosts	Kids See Ghosts	American Teen †	Khalid	Kids See Ghosts	Kids See Ghosts	
June 30	Everything Is Love	The Carters	17	XXXTentacion	Everything Is Love	The Carters	
July 7	?	XXXTentacion	17	XXXTentacion	?	XXXTentacion	
July 14	Scorpion †	Drake	17	XXXTentacion	Scorpion †	Drake	
July 21	Scorpion †	Drake	17	XXXTentacion	Scorpion †	Drake	
July 28	Scorpion †	Drake	17	XXXTentacion	Scorpion †	Drake	
August 4	Scorpion †	Drake	17	XXXTentacion	Scorpion †	Drake	
August 11	Scorpion †	Drake	17	XXXTentacion	Scorpion †	Drake	
August 18	Astroworld	Travis Scott	I Used to Know Her: The Prelude	H.E.R.	Astroworld	Travis Scott	
August 25	Astroworld	Travis Scott	30 Greatest Hits	Aretha Franklin	Astroworld	Travis Scott	
September 1	Astroworld	Travis Scott	30 Greatest Hits	Aretha Franklin	Astroworld	Travis Scott	
September 8	Astroworld	Travis Scott	17	XXXTentacion	Astroworld	Travis Scott	
September 15	Kamikaze	Eminem	17	XXXTentacion	Kamikaze	Eminem	
September 22	Kamikaze	Eminem	17	XXXTentacion	Kamikaze	Eminem	
September 29	Kamikaze	Eminem	East Atlanta Love Letter	6lack	Kamikaze	Eminem	
October 6	Iridescence	Brockhampton	Piano & a Microphone 1983	Prince	Iridescence	Brockhampton	
October 13	Tha Carter V	Lil Wayne	East Atlanta Love Letter	6lack	Tha Carter V	Lil Wayne	
October 20	Tha Carter V	Lil Wayne	17	XXXTentacion	Tha Carter V	Lil Wayne	
October 27	Quavo Huncho	Quavo	Ella Mai	Ella Mai	Quavo Huncho	Quavo	
November 3	Wrld on Drugs	Future and Juice Wrld	Suncity	Khalid	Wrld on Drugs	Future and Juice Wrld	
November 10	Ballads 1	Joji	Ballads 1	Joji	Love Me Now?	Tory Lanez	
November 17	Not All Heroes Wear Capes	Metro Boomin	Ella Mai	Ella Mai	Not All Heroes Wear Capes	Metro Boomin	
November 24	A Love Letter to You 3	Trippie Redd	Ella Mai	Ella Mai	A Love Letter to You 3	Trippie Redd	
December 1	Caution	Mariah Carey	Caution	Mariah Carey	Astroworld	Travis Scott	
December 8	Astroworld	Travis Scott	Merry Christmas	Mariah Carey	Astroworld	Travis Scott	
December 15	Championships	Meek Mill	Merry Christmas	Mariah Carey	Championships	Meek Mill	
December 22	Skins	XXXTentacion	Merry Christmas	Mariah Carey	Skins	XXXTentacion	
December 29	Dying to Live	Kodak Black	Merry Christmas	Mariah Carey	Dying to Live	Kodak Black	

== See also ==
- 2018 in music
- List of Billboard 200 number-one albums of 2018
- List of number-one R&B/hip-hop songs of 2018 (U.S.)
