= List of number-one hits of 2017 (Denmark) =

Tracklisten is a chart that ranks the best-performing singles and tracks in Denmark. Its data, published by IFPI Denmark and compiled by Nielsen Music Control, is based collectively on each single's weekly digital sales.

== Chart history ==
Week	Issue date	Song	Artist(s)	Ref.
52/2016	4 January	"Guld jul"	Gulddreng	
1	11 January	"Rockabye"	Clean Bandit featuring Sean Paul and Anne-Marie	
2	18 January	"Shape of You"	Ed Sheeran	
3	25 January	"Shape of You"	Ed Sheeran	
4	1 February	"Shape of You"	Ed Sheeran	
5	8 February	"Shape of You"	Ed Sheeran	
6	15 February	"Shape of You"	Ed Sheeran	
7	22 February	"Shape of You"	Ed Sheeran	
8	1 March	"Shape of You"	Ed Sheeran	
9	8 March	"Shape of You"	Ed Sheeran	
10	15 March	"Shape of You"	Ed Sheeran	
11	22 March	"Shape of You"	Ed Sheeran	
12	29 March	"Shape of You"	Ed Sheeran	
13	5 April	"Shape of You"	Ed Sheeran	
14	12 April	"Shape of You"	Ed Sheeran	
15	19 April	"Shape of You"	Ed Sheeran	
16	26 April	"Shape of You"	Ed Sheeran	
17	3 May	"Despacito"	Luis Fonsi featuring Daddy Yankee	
18	10 May	"Despacito"	Luis Fonsi featuring Daddy Yankee	
19	17 May	"Despacito"	Luis Fonsi featuring Daddy Yankee	
20	24 May	"Despacito"	Luis Fonsi featuring Daddy Yankee	
21	31 May	"Despacito"	Luis Fonsi featuring Daddy Yankee	
22	7 June	"Despacito"	Luis Fonsi featuring Daddy Yankee	
23	14 June	"Despacito"	Luis Fonsi and Daddy Yankee featuring Justin Bieber	
24	21 June	"Despacito"	Luis Fonsi and Daddy Yankee featuring Justin Bieber	
25	28 June	"Despacito"	Luis Fonsi and Daddy Yankee featuring Justin Bieber	
26	5 July	"Despacito"	Luis Fonsi and Daddy Yankee featuring Justin Bieber	
27	12 July	"Despacito"	Luis Fonsi and Daddy Yankee featuring Justin Bieber	
28	19 July	"Despacito"	Luis Fonsi and Daddy Yankee featuring Justin Bieber	
29	26 July	"Despacito"	Luis Fonsi and Daddy Yankee featuring Justin Bieber	
30	2 August	"Despacito"	Luis Fonsi and Daddy Yankee featuring Justin Bieber	
31	9 August	"Despacito"	Luis Fonsi and Daddy Yankee featuring Justin Bieber	
32	16 August	"Despacito"	Luis Fonsi and Daddy Yankee featuring Justin Bieber	
33	23 August	"Despacito"	Luis Fonsi and Daddy Yankee featuring Justin Bieber	
34	30 August	"Friends"	Justin Bieber and BloodPop	
35	6 September	"Friends"	Justin Bieber and BloodPop	
36	13 September	"Friends"	Justin Bieber and BloodPop	
37	20 September	"Friends"	Justin Bieber and BloodPop	
38	27 September	"2017"	Rasmus Seebach	
39	4 October	"Rockstar"	Post Malone featuring 21 Savage	
40	11 October	"Rockstar"	Post Malone featuring 21 Savage	
41	18 October	"Rockstar"	Post Malone featuring 21 Savage	
42	25 October	"Rockstar"	Post Malone featuring 21 Savage	
43	1 November	"Rockstar"	Post Malone featuring 21 Savage	
44	8 November	"Rockstar"	Post Malone featuring 21 Savage	
45	15 November	"Rockstar"	Post Malone featuring 21 Savage	
46	22 November	"Rockstar"	Post Malone featuring 21 Savage	
47	29 November	"Rockstar"	Post Malone featuring 21 Savage	
48	6 December	"Rockstar"	Post Malone featuring 21 Savage	
49	13 December	"Perfect"	Ed Sheeran	
50	20 December	"Perfect"	Ed Sheeran	
51	27 December	"Perfect"	Ed Sheeran	
52	3 January 2018	"Perfect"	Ed Sheeran	
