= Scary Hours =

EP by Drake
- Released: January 19, 2018
- Recorded: 2017
- Length: 7:33
- Labels: Young Money; Cash Money; Republic
- Producers: 40; Boi-1da; Cardo; Nick Brongers; Yung Exclusive

Drake chronology
More Life (2017)	Scary Hours (2018)	Scorpion (2018)

Singles from Scary Hours
- 1. "God's Plan" Released: January 19, 2018

Scary Hours is the second extended play by Canadian rapper Drake. It was first released on January 19, 2018, by Young Money Entertainment, Cash Money Records and Republic Records. It contains the single "God's Plan", which also appeared on Drake's fifth studio album Scorpion (2018). The EP was revealed to the public via social media shortly before its release. A sequel, Scary Hours 2, was released March 5, 2021; another follow-up, For All the Dogs Scary Hours Edition, was released on November 17, 2023.

== Background ==
Following his 2016 album Views and 2017 mixtape More Life, Drake announced the surprise release of the two-song EP Scary Hours on January 19, 2018, featuring the songs "God's Plan" and "Diplomatic Immunity". Several celebrity news outlets commented on the fact that Drake mentions his relationship with singer Jennifer Lopez in the "Diplomatic Immunity" lyric: "2010 was when I lost my halo / 2017 I lost a J. Lo / A Rotterdam trip had me on front page, though". Drake was accused of stealing another artist's cover art on January 22, 2018.

After the release of Scorpion later that year, the EP was removed from streaming services as "God's Plan" was moved to that album. "Diplomatic Immunity" was then reformatted as a standalone single.

== Artwork controversy ==
The artwork for Scary Hours was accused of plagiarizing a style for a tour poster designed by Collin Fletcher for musical artist Rabit. Both pieces contained a vertical-orientated texted, with a word stylized in a colored Blackletter typeface layered over another word styled in a white and bolded Sans-serif typeface. However, Billboard reported that OVO Sound, Drake's own record label, picked the artwork when it was presented with other options, unaware of the similarities.

== Commercial performance ==
The two songs combined on the EP sold for 90,000 album equivalent units in the first week.

== Track listing ==
Scary Hours track listing
No.	Title	Writer(s)	Producer(s)	Length
1.	"God's Plan"	Aubrey Graham; Ronald LaTour; Daveon Jackson; Matthew Samuels; Noah Shebib; Brock Korsan	Cardo; Yung Exclusive; Boi-1da; 40^{[b]}	3:18
2.	"Diplomatic Immunity"	Graham; Samuels; Nick Brongers	Boi-1da; Brongers^{[a]}	4:15
Total length:				7:33

Notes

- ^{^[a]} signifies a co-producer
- ^{^[b]} signifies an additional producer

== Release history ==
Release history and formats for Scary Hours
Region	Date	Format(s)	Label	Ref.
Various	January 19, 2018	Digital download; streaming	Young Money; Cash Money	
