= List of Billboard Hot 100 number ones of 2018 =

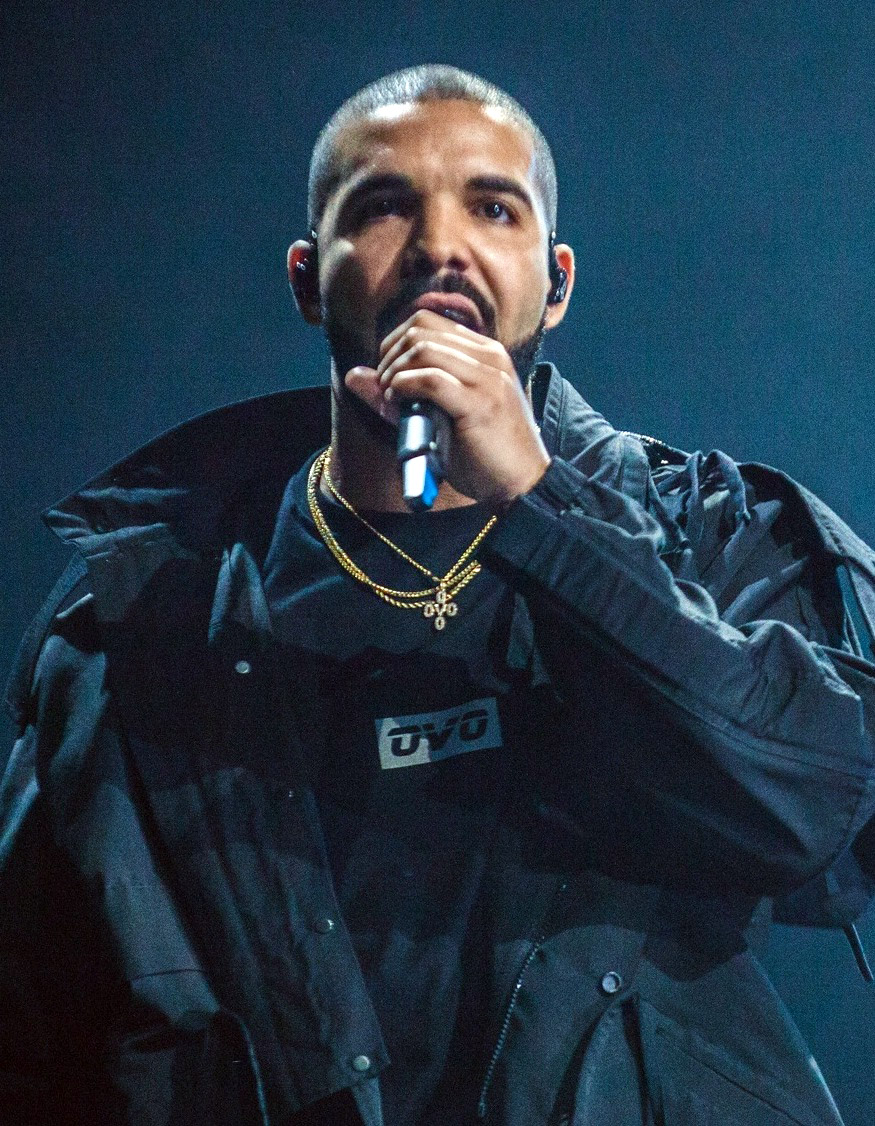
Drake (pictured) scored three number-one hits with "God's Plan", "Nice for What", and "In My Feelings". He beat the record for most weeks at number one in a year for a single artist, with 29 weeks at number one. "God's Plan" became the longest-running number-one hit of the year and topped the Billboard Year-End Hot 100 of 2018.

The Billboard Hot 100 is a chart that ranks the best-performing songs in the United States. Its data, published by Billboard magazine and compiled by Nielsen SoundScan, is based collectively on each song's weekly physical and digital sales, as well as the amount of airplay received on American radio stations and streaming on online digital music outlets.

During 2018, eleven singles reached number one on the Hot 100; a twelfth single, "Perfect" by Ed Sheeran, solo or duet with Beyoncé, began its run at number one in December 2017. Of those eleven number-one singles, four were collaborations. In total, thirteen acts topped the chart as either lead or featured artists, with nine—Camila Cabello, Young Thug, Childish Gambino, Ty Dolla Sign, XXXTentacion, Bad Bunny, J Balvin, Ariana Grande and Travis Scott—achieving their first Hot 100 number-one single. Drake's "God's Plan" was the longest-running number-one of the year, leading the chart for eleven weeks; it subsequently topped the Billboard Year-End Hot 100. Drake beat the record for most weeks at number one in a year for a single artist, with 29 weeks at number one. XXXTentacion became the first artist to have a posthumous number one since Static Major featured on Lil Wayne's "Lollipop" in 2008 and the first artist to lead the chart with a posthumous number one since The Notorious B.I.G.'s "Hypnotize" in 1997, and is the eighth overall.

Drake and Cardi B were the only acts to have multiple number-one songs in 2018, with Drake having the most with three and Cardi B with two.

Billboard added a mid-week chart on January 3, 2018, as part of an effort to cut the time between data collection and chart publication. This Wednesday chart is the only mid-week chart in the history of the Hot 100.

== Chart history ==
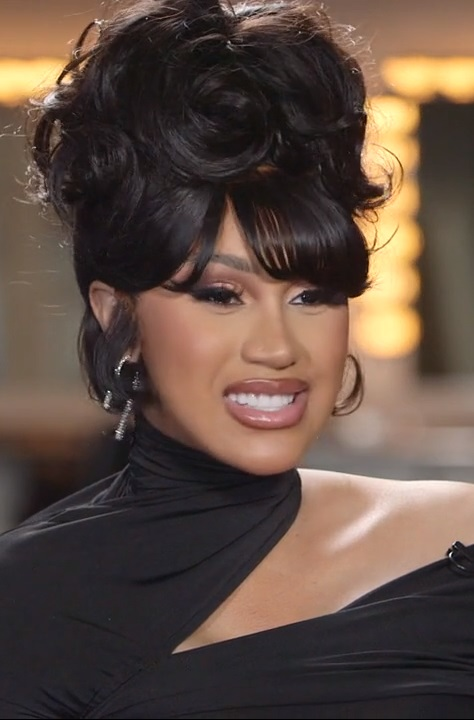
Cardi B (pictured) scored a second number-one song with "I Like It", making her the first female rapper to do so. She later scored a third number one with a featured credit on Maroon 5's "Girls Like You" extending her own record for most number ones among female rappers.

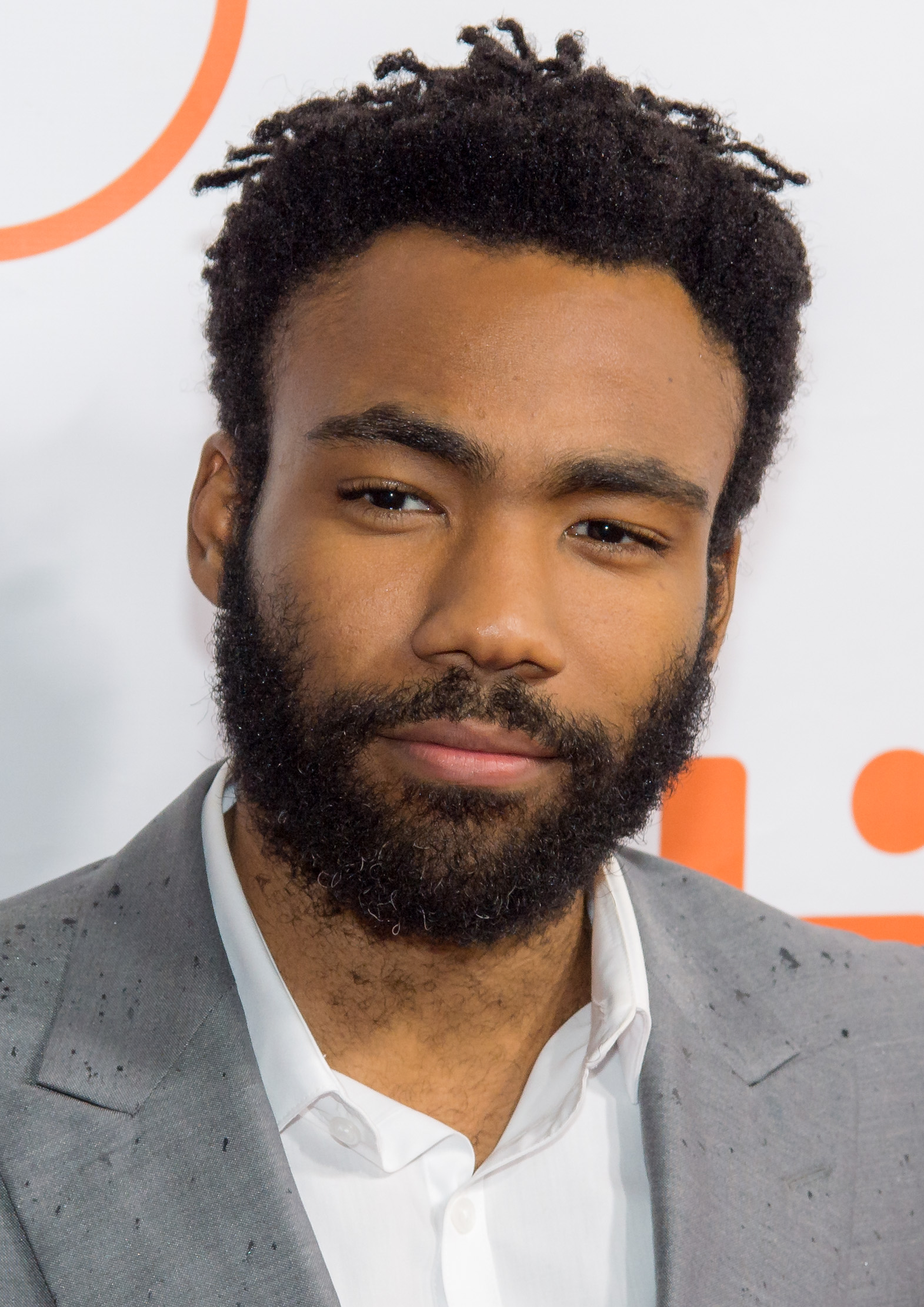
"This Is America" became Childish Gambino's (pictured) first song to top the Hot 100.

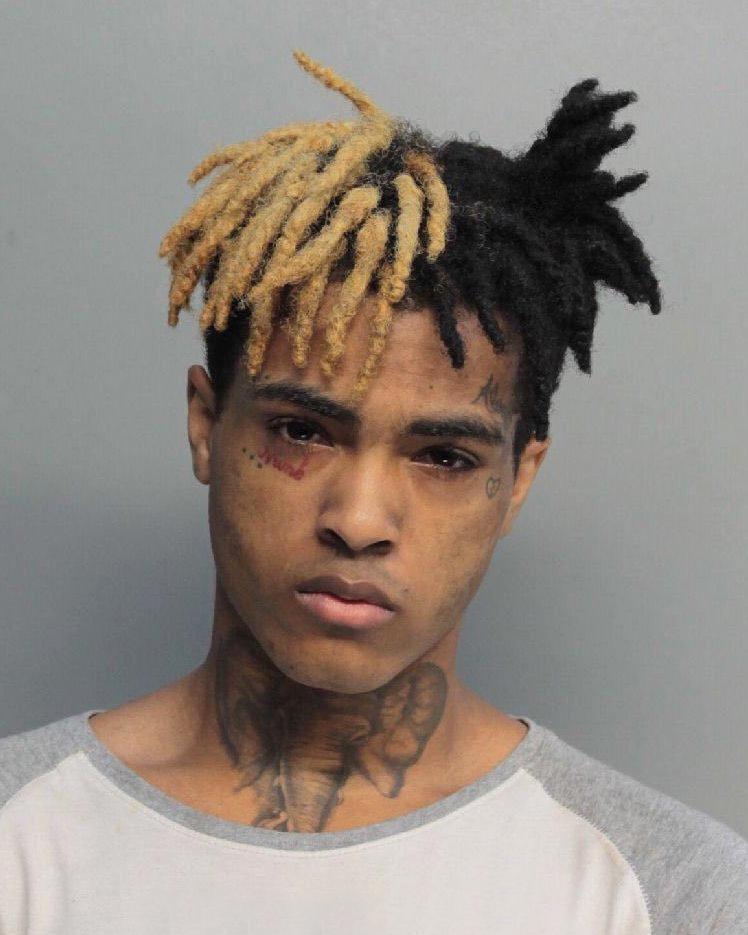
XXXTentacion (pictured) became the first artist to posthumously top the chart as a lead artist since The Notorious B.I.G. in 1997, with "Sad!" hitting number one following his death.

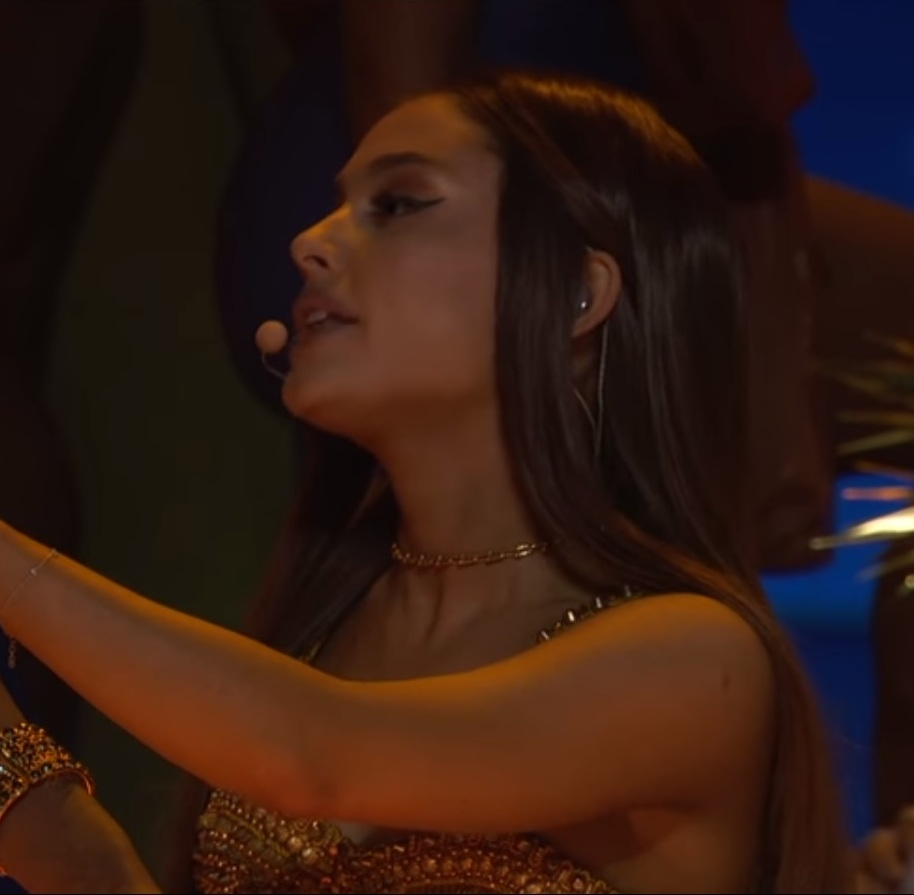
"Thank U, Next" became Ariana Grande's (pictured) first song to top the Hot 100.

Key
†	Indicates best-performing song of 2018

No.	Issue date	Song	Artist(s)	Ref.
1069	January 3	"Perfect"	Ed Sheeran and Beyoncé	
1069	January 6	"Perfect"	Ed Sheeran and Beyoncé	
1069	January 13	"Perfect"	Ed Sheeran and Beyoncé	
1069	January 20	"Perfect"	Ed Sheeran (Note: From this issue date, Billboard returned to credit solely Ed Sheeran for the chart performance of "Perfect" on the Billboard Hot 100.)	
1070	January 27	"Havana"	Camila Cabello featuring Young Thug	
1071	February 3	"God's Plan" †	Drake	
1071	February 10	"God's Plan" †	Drake	
1071	February 17	"God's Plan" †	Drake	
1071	February 24	"God's Plan" †	Drake	
1071	March 3	"God's Plan" †	Drake	
1071	March 10	"God's Plan" †	Drake	
1071	March 17	"God's Plan" †	Drake	
1071	March 24	"God's Plan" †	Drake	
1071	March 31	"God's Plan" †	Drake	
1071	April 7	"God's Plan" †	Drake	
1071	April 14	"God's Plan" †	Drake	
1072	April 21	"Nice for What"	Drake	
1072	April 28	"Nice for What"	Drake	
1072	May 5	"Nice for What"	Drake	
1072	May 12	"Nice for What"	Drake	
1073	May 19	"This Is America"	Childish Gambino	
1073	May 26	"This Is America"	Childish Gambino	
re	June 2	"Nice for What"	Drake	
re	June 9	"Nice for What"	Drake	
1074	June 16	"Psycho"	Post Malone featuring Ty Dolla Sign	
re	June 23	"Nice for What"	Drake	
1075	June 30	"Sad!"	XXXTentacion	
1076	July 7	"I Like It"	Cardi B, Bad Bunny and J Balvin	
re	July 14	"Nice for What"	Drake	
1077	July 21	"In My Feelings"	Drake	
1077	July 28	"In My Feelings"	Drake	
1077	August 4	"In My Feelings"	Drake	
1077	August 11	"In My Feelings"	Drake	
1077	August 18	"In My Feelings"	Drake	
1077	August 25	"In My Feelings"	Drake	
1077	September 1	"In My Feelings"	Drake	
1077	September 8	"In My Feelings"	Drake	
1077	September 15	"In My Feelings"	Drake	
1077	September 22	"In My Feelings"	Drake	
1078	September 29	"Girls Like You"	Maroon 5 featuring Cardi B	
1078	October 6	"Girls Like You"	Maroon 5 featuring Cardi B	
1078	October 13	"Girls Like You"	Maroon 5 featuring Cardi B	
1078	October 20	"Girls Like You"	Maroon 5 featuring Cardi B	
1078	October 27	"Girls Like You"	Maroon 5 featuring Cardi B	
1078	November 3	"Girls Like You"	Maroon 5 featuring Cardi B	
1078	November 10	"Girls Like You"	Maroon 5 featuring Cardi B	
1079	November 17	"Thank U, Next"	Ariana Grande	
1079	November 24	"Thank U, Next"	Ariana Grande	
1079	December 1	"Thank U, Next"	Ariana Grande	
1080	December 8	"Sicko Mode"	Travis Scott	
re	December 15	"Thank U, Next"	Ariana Grande	
re	December 22	"Thank U, Next"	Ariana Grande	
re	December 29	"Thank U, Next"	Ariana Grande	

== Number-one artists ==
List of number-one artists by total weeks at number one
Position	Artist	Weeks at No. 1
1	Drake	29
2	Cardi B	8
3	Maroon 5	7
4	Ariana Grande	6
5	Ed Sheeran	4
6	Beyoncé	3
7	Childish Gambino	2
8	Camila Cabello	1
8	Young Thug	1
8	Post Malone	1
8	Ty Dolla Sign	1
8	XXXTentacion	1
8	Bad Bunny	1
8	J Balvin	1
8	Travis Scott	1

== See also ==
- 2018 in American music
- List of Billboard 200 number-one albums of 2018
- List of Billboard Hot 100 top-ten singles in 2018
- Billboard Year-End Hot 100 singles of 2018
- List of Billboard Hot 100 number-one singles of the 2010s
