= List of Billboard 200 number-one albums of 2018 =

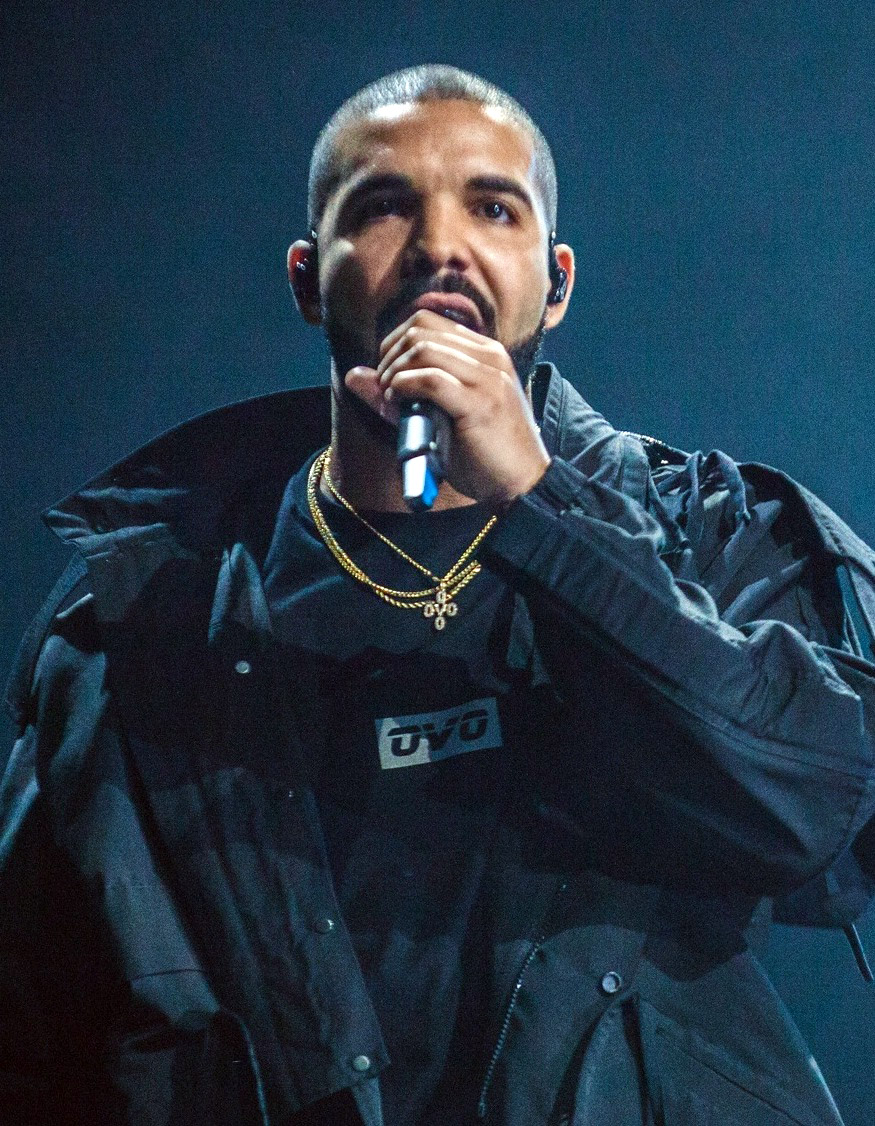
Drake's Scorpion was the most consumed album of 2018, staying atop the Billboard 200 for five consecutive weeks.

This is a list of the albums ranked number one in the United States during 2018. The top-performing albums and EPs in the United States are ranked in the Billboard 200 chart, which is published by Billboard magazine. The data are compiled by Nielsen Soundscan based on each album's weekly physical and digital sales, as well as on-demand streaming and digital sales of its individual tracks.

In 2018, a total of 41 albums claimed the top position of the chart. The year began with Revival, the ninth studio album by an American rapper Eminem, on the first issue dated January 3, 2018, and witnessed the return of Taylor Swift's sixth studio album, Reputation, to the number one spot for a fourth chart-topping week after staying atop the chart for three consecutive weeks in 2017.

Scorpion by Canadian rapper Drake earned 732,000 units in its first week, marking the largest opening week sales of 2018, followed by rapper Travis Scott's third studio album, Astroworld, which moved 537,000 units in its first week. The soundtrack of The Greatest Showman (2017) was the best selling album of 2018, with 1.491 million copies sold. It was the third most consumed album of 2018, with 2.499 million units. Scorpion was the most consumed album of 2018 with 3.905 million units, of which only 330,000 were sales. It was followed by Beerbongs & Bentleys by American singer and rapper Post Malone, which was the second most-consumed album with 3.251 million units. Nevertheless, Reputation was the best performing album of 2018, topping the Billboard 200 year-end chart.

== Chart history ==
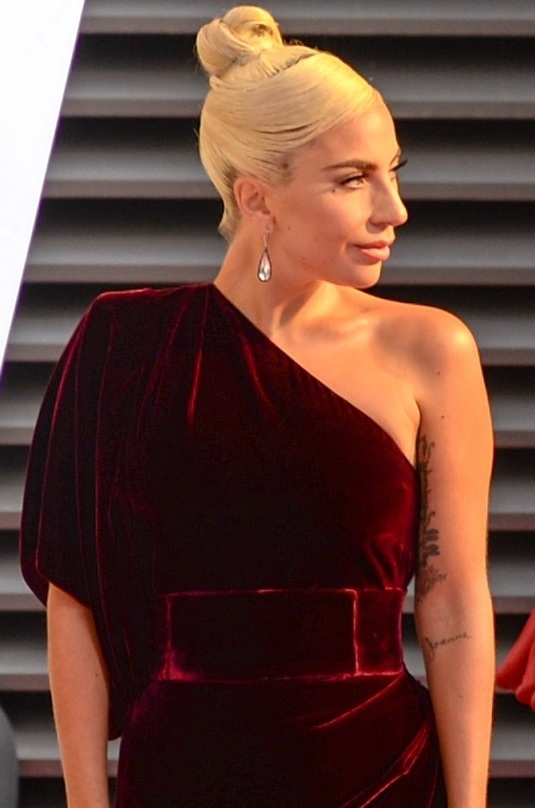
A Star Is Born made Lady Gaga the first female artist to have five number-one albums in the 2010s decade. It was the second best-selling album of 2018.

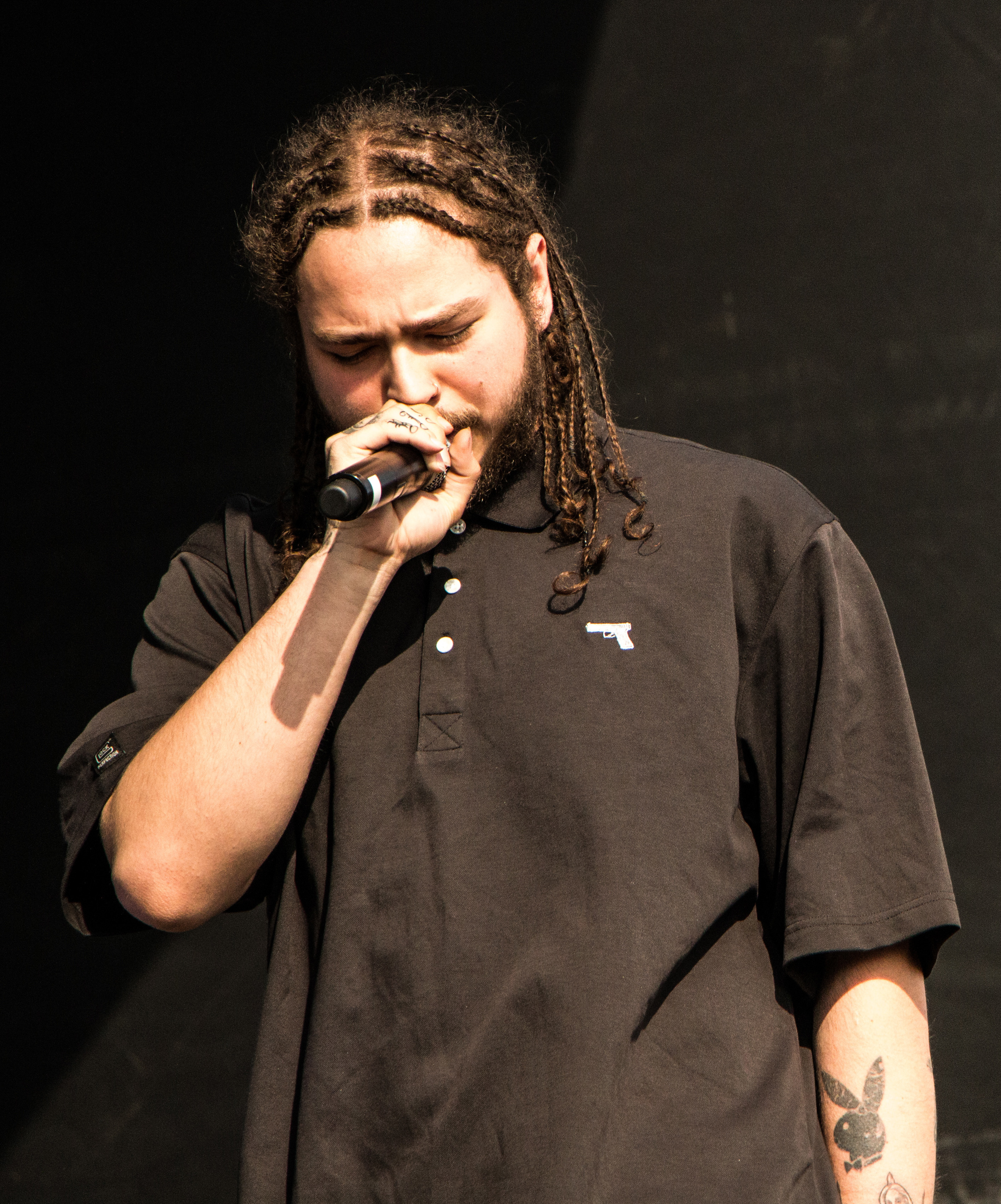
Post Malone reached the top spot with Beerbongs & Bentleys, which stayed at number one for three consecutive weeks. It became the second most consumed album of 2018.

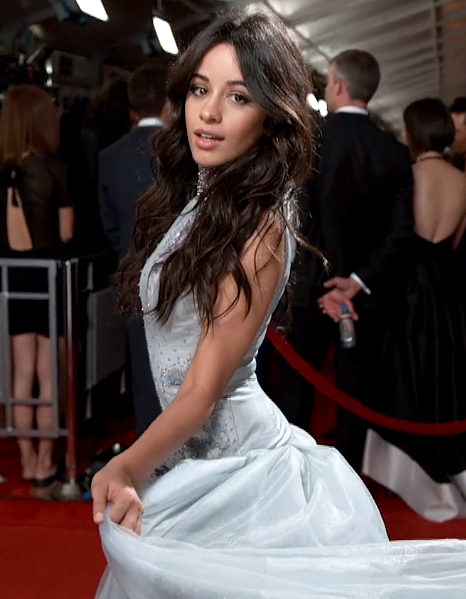
Camila, the debut album by Camila Cabello, topped the chart the same week its lead single "Havana" topped the Billboard Hot 100.

Key
†	Indicates best-performing album of 2018

Issue date	Album	Artist(s)	Album- equivalent units	Ref.
January 3	Revival	Eminem	267,000	
January 6	Reputation †	Taylor Swift	107,000	
January 13	The Greatest Showman	Soundtrack	106,000	
January 20	The Greatest Showman	Soundtrack	104,000	
January 27	Camila	Camila Cabello	119,000	
February 3	Mania	Fall Out Boy	130,000	
February 10	Culture II	Migos	199,000	
February 17	Man of the Woods	Justin Timberlake	293,000	
February 24	Black Panther: The Album	Kendrick Lamar / Soundtrack	154,000	
March 3	Black Panther: The Album	Kendrick Lamar / Soundtrack	131,000	
March 10	This House Is Not for Sale	Bon Jovi	120,000	
March 17	Black Panther: The Album	Kendrick Lamar / Soundtrack	76,000	
March 24	Bobby Tarantino II	Logic	119,000	
March 31	?	XXXTentacion	131,000	
April 7	Boarding House Reach	Jack White	124,000	
April 14	My Dear Melancholy,	The Weeknd	169,000	
April 21	Invasion of Privacy	Cardi B	255,000	
April 28	Rearview Town	Jason Aldean	183,000	
May 5	KOD	J. Cole	397,000	
May 12	Beerbongs & Bentleys	Post Malone	461,000	
May 19	Beerbongs & Bentleys	Post Malone	193,000	
May 26	Beerbongs & Bentleys	Post Malone	147,000	
June 2	Love Yourself: Tear	BTS	135,000	
June 9	Shawn Mendes	Shawn Mendes	182,000	
June 16	Ye	Kanye West	208,000	
June 23	Come Tomorrow	Dave Matthews Band	292,000	
June 30	Youngblood	5 Seconds of Summer	142,000	
July 7	Pray for the Wicked	Panic! at the Disco	180,000	
July 14	Scorpion	Drake	732,000	
July 21	Scorpion	Drake	335,000	
July 28	Scorpion	Drake	260,000	
August 4	Scorpion	Drake	184,000	
August 11	Scorpion	Drake	145,000	
August 18	Astroworld	Travis Scott	537,000	
August 25	Astroworld	Travis Scott	205,000	
September 1	Sweetener	Ariana Grande	231,000	
September 8	Love Yourself: Answer	BTS	185,000	
September 15	Kamikaze	Eminem	434,000	
September 22	Egypt Station	Paul McCartney	153,000	
September 29	Cry Pretty	Carrie Underwood	266,000	
October 6	Iridescence	Brockhampton	101,000	
October 13	Tha Carter V	Lil Wayne	480,000	
October 20	A Star Is Born	Lady Gaga and Bradley Cooper / Soundtrack	231,000	
October 27	A Star Is Born	Lady Gaga and Bradley Cooper / Soundtrack	143,000	
November 3	A Star Is Born	Lady Gaga and Bradley Cooper / Soundtrack	109,000	
November 10	Sì	Andrea Bocelli	126,000	
November 17	Not All Heroes Wear Capes	Metro Boomin	99,000	
November 24	Experiment	Kane Brown	124,000	
December 1	Delta	Mumford & Sons	230,000	
December 8	Astroworld	Travis Scott	71,000	
December 15	Championships	Meek Mill	229,000	
December 22	Skins	XXXTentacion	132,000	
December 29	Dying to Live	Kodak Black	89,000	

== See also ==
- 2018 in American music
- List of Billboard Hot 100 number ones of 2018
