= Diplomatic Immunity (song) =

Promotional single by Drake

from the EP Scary Hours
- A-side: "God's Plan"
- Released: January 19, 2018
- Recorded: 2017 in Toronto, Canada
- Genre: Trap
- Length: 4:16
- Label: Young Money; Cash Money
- Songwriters: Aubrey Graham; Matthew Samuels; Nick Brongers
- Producers: Boi-1da; Brongers

"Diplomatic Immunity" is a song by Canadian rapper Drake. It was released on January 19, 2018, as the second track on his second EP, Scary Hours (2018). The song, alongside "God's Plan", debuted in the top ten on the US Billboard Hot 100, where they became Drake's 21st and 22nd top ten entries on the chart, making him the only artist in Billboard history at the time to debut two songs in the top ten at once twice, with "Diplomatic Immunity" debuting at number seven and "God's Plan" at number one. It also debuted at number six in Canada, and at number 21 on the UK Singles Chart on January 26, 2018.

== Composition ==
The song is written in the key of A minor with a tempo of 150 (75 in double-time) beats per minute.

== Release and reception ==
"Diplomatic Immunity" was released alongside "God's Plan" as a part of the Scary Hours EP and made available for digital download and streaming on January 19, 2018, by Young Money Entertainment and Cash Money Records. While "God's Plan" was included on Drake's following album Scorpion, "Diplomatic Immunity" was not.

The song has received mixed reviews. Sheldon Pearce of Pitchfork described the song as having "some of the best rapping" of Drake's, but thought that "his verses are still littered with awkward wordplay and corny concepts", and that the "silly griping" in the song is "melodramatic and self-owning, the result of a sore winner being a sourpuss".

== Commercial performance ==
In the United States, "Diplomatic Immunity" debuted at number seven on the Billboard Hot 100 on the chart dated February 3, 2018, where it became Drake's 22nd top ten on the chart. The song then remained on the chart for three weeks before falling off on the chart dated February 24, 2018.

Internationally, the song has peaked in the top ten in Canada, the top 40 in the United Kingdom and has charted on the charts of Australia, Austria, France, Greece, Ireland, the Netherlands, New Zealand, Sweden and Switzerland .

== Charts ==
Chart (2018)	Peak position
Australia (ARIA)	54
Austria (Ö3 Austria Top 40)	64
Canada Hot 100 (Billboard)	6
France (SNEP)	169
Greece (IFPI)	26
Ireland (IRMA)	38
Netherlands (Single Top 100)	61
New Zealand Heatseekers (RMNZ)	3
Sweden (Sverigetopplistan)	84
Switzerland (Schweizer Hitparade)	42
UK Singles (OCC)	21
UK Hip Hop/R&B (OCC)	8
US Billboard Hot 100	7
US Hot R&B/Hip-Hop Songs (Billboard)	4

== Release history ==
Region	Date	Format	Label	Ref.
Various	January 19, 2018	Digital download	Young Money; Cash Money	
