= God's Plan (song) =

2018 single by Drake

Single by Drake

from the EP Scary Hours and the album Scorpion
- B-side: "Diplomatic Immunity"
- Released: January 19, 2018
- Recorded: 2017
- Studio: NightBird (West Hollywood); S.O.T.A. (Toronto)
- Genre: Pop-rap; trap
- Length: 3:19
- Label: Young Money; Cash Money; Republic
- Songwriters: Aubrey Graham; Ronald LaTour; Banko Jackson; Matthew Samuels; Noah Shebib; Brock Korsan
- Producers: Cardo; Yung Exclusive; Boi-1da; 40 (addi.)

Drake singles chronology
"No Complaints" (2017)	"God's Plan" (2018)	"Look Alive" (2018)

Music video
- "God's Plan" on YouTube

"God's Plan" is a song recorded by Canadian rapper Drake, released on January 19, 2018, through Young Money and Cash Money. The song was written alongside Brock Korsan and producers Cardo, Yung Exclusive, Boi-1da, and Noah "40" Shebib. It acts as the respective only and lead single from his second EP Scary Hours and fifth studio album Scorpion (both 2018). Musically, it has been described as pop-rap and trap, with lyrics addressing Drake's fame and fate.

"God's Plan" received mostly positive reviews from music critics, who praised its catchiness and production but called it a typical Drake song. Commercially the song became the 29th song in history to debut at number one on the US Billboard Hot 100, making it Drake's fourth chart-topper in that country, and second as a lead artist. The single topped the charts in fourteen countries, including the UK and Canada, and reached the top ten in nine others. The song broke first-day streaming records on both Apple Music and Spotify, and was the most streamed song of the year on both services. It was the number one song of 2018 in the United States, New Zealand, and Portugal.

An accompanying music video for the song was directed by Karena Evans and uploaded onto Drake's official YouTube channel on February 16, 2018. In the video, Drake is giving away nearly one million U.S. dollars to people and institutions in Florida. It received five nominations at the 2018 MTV Video Music Awards, including for Video of the Year and three nominations at the 61st Grammy Awards for Record of the Year, Song of the Year, and Best Rap Song, winning the latter. It was also Billboard's number-one rap song of the year, claiming the top spot on the Billboard Year-End Hot Rap Songs of 2018.

== Background and composition ==
The song, originally titled "Grace of God", was chosen from a series of beats sent to Drake in September. Drake apparently called up Cardo and said "We got one" before the production of the record itself began fully. Following the release of his fourth studio album Views (2016) and his playlist More Life (2017), Drake did not release any music for eight months until the EP Scary Hours on January 19, 2018, following multiple leaks, like for "Pistols". "God's Plan", was first teased on January 1, 2018, at a New York New Year's Eve Party, and originally featured American rapper Trippie Redd. Redd had been talking about the collaboration since October 2017.

"God's Plan" was written by Aubrey Graham, Ronald LaTour, Daveon Jackson, Matthew Samuels, and Noah Shebib and produced by Cardo, Yung Exclusive, and Boi-1da. The original instrumental for "God's Plan" was sent to Drake in September 2017 by Cardo. Cardo created the instrumental with FL Studio and some VSTs. Boi-1da's addition to the song came when Drake gave him "God's Plan" half finished. Drake requested the song to have a more "bouncy vibe" and Boi-1da added more drums to the production. Musically the song has been described as a pop, pop-rap and trap song composed in common time (4/4 time) with a length of three minutes eighteen seconds and written in the key of E minor with a tempo of 154 (or 77) beats per minute and a common chord progression of Am7–Bm7.

== Release ==
"God's Plan" was released alongside "Diplomatic Immunity" as a part of the Scary Hours EP and made available for digital download and streaming on January 19, 2018, by Young Money Entertainment and Cash Money Records. It then also became the lead single for his fifth studio album, Scorpion (2018). The song launched with the largest on-demand streaming count in history, breaking Apple's first-day streaming record upon release with 14 million streams and breaking Spotify's single-day streaming record with 4.3 million plays in twenty four hours. The song was streamed 82.4 million times in its first week.

== Critical reception ==
Talking about the song, Noisey said, "This is a good song that I've heard Drake do about 600 different versions of [...] I want to hear something different from Drake for a change, and this is definitely not what I would have hoped for." Maeve McDermott of USA Today called the song "middling".

Def Leppard’s Joe Elliott said of the song,

"Where's the hook? Where's the hook, dude? You know what it reminds me of, it reminds me of an updated version of Richie Havens or something like that. But Richie would sit on a stool, play the guitar, sing and sweat and make more of an effort to perform and put melody and heart and soul into it."

Tom Ewing of Freaky Trigger named it the third worst UK number-one hit of 2018, opining that "when Drake has a tedious backing track he really does sound like the most boring rapper there’s ever been. You could spend years – collectively, the world did – looking for a hook in this."

== Commercial performance ==
In the United States, "God's Plan" debuted at number one on the Billboard Hot 100 on the chart dated February 3, 2018, becoming Drake's fourth Hot 100 number-one song. It achieved 82.4 million streams and 127,000 downloads in the country, in the week ending January 25. "God's Plan" held steady at number one for its second week on the chart, gaining 83.3 million streams. At the end of February, "God's Plan" became the second song in the Hot 100's history to achieve more than 100 million weekly streams. The single topped the Hot 100 for 11 weeks, becoming the 24th song in the history of the chart to do so. It was later unseated on the issue date April 21, 2018 by Drake's follow-up single "Nice for What". The song is also the fourth to have spent at least its first eleven weeks on the chart at number one, and the first since "One Sweet Day" in 1996. "God's Plan" ultimately spent 26 weeks in the top ten and left the chart after 36 weeks. The single would go on to top the Billboard Hot 100 Year–End chart. It became the most-streamed song of 2018 in the United States, with 1,565,711,000 on-demand streams (918.87 million audio and 647.84 video). It was also the second best-selling digital song of 2018 with 1,056,000 copies sold, behind Ed Sheeran's "Perfect".

In the United Kingdom, "God's Plan" debuted at the top of the UK Singles Chart on January 26, 2018, for the week ending date February 1, 2018 after appearing to be first in the midweek singles chart. Drake had suddenly charted in what was expected to be a close race between Eminem and Ed Sheeran's "River" and Ramz's "Barking". "God's Plan" became Drake's third UK number one and had achieved 6.5 million streams in its first week and 54,000 sales. Hugh McIntyre of Forbes wrote that the song "shockingly debuted at No.1 across the pond, proving Drake to be an artist with unparalleled power." In its second week on the UK Singles Chart, "God's Plan" achieved 60,000 sales with 50,000 coming from streams, retaining its position at number one. "God's Plan" faced competition in its third week as its sales decreased 7% with Rudimental's "These Days" only 5,000 sales behind. Despite this, "God's Plan" was able to once again retain its position as number one and was certified Silver by the BPI. "God's Plan" stayed at number one for nine consecutive weeks in the UK, seven of which kept "These Days" by Rudimental at number two, until it became subject to accelerated chart ratio (ACR). The single was the second best-performing song on the British single charts, accumulating 1,56 million single-equivalent units. It was the most streamed song of the year, with 147 million.

== Music video ==
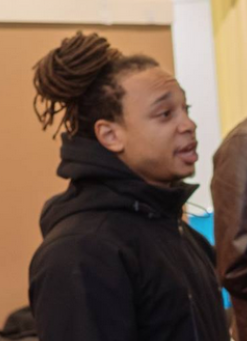
The music video was shot by cinematographer Jordan Oram, who has shot several videos with Drake, including for the singles “In My Feelings” and “Life Is Good”.

An accompanying music video for the track was uploaded onto Drake's official YouTube channel on February 16, 2018. The Karena Evans-directed music video was filmed by cinematographer Jordan Oram in Miami on February 5, 2018. The shooting for the video attracted significant media attention due to Drake donating $175,000 during the filming of the video to random Miami residents.

The video depicts Drake in Miami engaging in acts of charity like gifts in kind, cash handouts and money donation through oversized cheques. Parts of the video were filmed at the Miami Senior High School in West Flagler. The video's opening states that its entire budget of $996,631.90 had been given away. At the University of Miami, Drake presented Destiny James, a young woman raised by a single mother in South Carolina, with a $50,000 oversized check for tuition fees for a Master's degree in public health. The same gimmick was used in the 2004 music video of Sarah McLachlan's World on Fire.

Upon release of the music video, where Drake gave away nearly $1 million worth of gifts, a meme began circulating on Twitter praising daily, random acts of kindness. As of July 2026, the music video has received over 1.7 billion views on YouTube. NFL wide receiver Antonio Brown is shown in the video dancing with Drake.

== Awards and nominations ==
Organization	Year	Award	Result	Ref.
BET Awards	2018	Video of the Year	Won	
BET Awards	2018	Coca-Cola Viewer's Choice Award	Nominated	
Teen Choice Awards	2018	Choice Song: Male Artist	Nominated	
Teen Choice Awards	2018	Choice Song: R&B/Hip-Hop	Nominated	
MTV Video Music Awards	2018	Video of the Year	Nominated	
MTV Video Music Awards	2018	Song of the Year	Nominated	
MTV Video Music Awards	2018	Best Hip-Hop Video	Nominated	
MTV Video Music Awards	2018	Best Video with a Social Message	Nominated	
MTV Video Music Awards	2018	Best Direction	Nominated	
iHeartRadio MMVAs	2018	Video of the Year	Nominated	
iHeartRadio MMVAs	2018	Best Director	Won	
iHeartRadio MMVAs	2018	Fan Fave Video	Nominated	
American Music Awards	2018	Video of the Year	Nominated	
American Music Awards	2018	Favorite Pop/Rock Song	Nominated	
American Music Awards	2018	Favorite Rap/Hip-Hop Song	Nominated	
BET Hip Hop Awards	2018	Best Hip Hop Video	Nominated	
BET Hip Hop Awards	2018	Single of the Year	Nominated	
MTV Europe Music Awards	2018	Best Song	Nominated	
People's Choice Awards	2018	The Song of 2018	Eliminated	
People's Choice Awards	2018	The Music Video of 2018	Eliminated	
Grammy Awards	2019	Record of the Year	Nominated	
Grammy Awards	2019	Song of the Year	Nominated	
Grammy Awards	2019	Best Rap Song	Won	
iHeartRadio Music Awards	2019	Song of the Year	Nominated	
iHeartRadio Music Awards	2019	Hip-Hop Song of the Year	Won	
iHeartRadio Music Awards	2019	Best Lyrics	Nominated	
iHeartRadio Music Awards	2019	Best Music Video	Nominated	

== Charts ==
=== Weekly charts ===
Weekly chart performance
Chart (2018–2019)	Peak position
Australia (ARIA)	1
Austria (Ö3 Austria Top 40)	3
Belgium (Ultratop 50 Flanders)	5
Belgium (Ultratop 50 Wallonia)	4
Canada Hot 100 (Billboard)	1
Canada CHR/Top 40 (Billboard)	10
Canada Hot AC (Billboard)	33
Colombia (National-Report)	30
Costa Rica (Monitor Latino)	7
Czech Republic Singles Digital (ČNS IFPI)	5
Denmark (Tracklisten)	1
Dominican Republic (SODINPRO)	32
Ecuador (National-Report)	37
Euro Digital Song Sales (Billboard)	2
Finland (Suomen virallinen lista)	3
France (SNEP)	2
Germany (GfK)	1
Greece (IFPI)	1
Honduras (Monitor Latino)	17
Hungary (Single Top 40)	18
Hungary (Stream Top 40)	3
Ireland (IRMA)	1
Italy (FIMI)	1
Lebanon (OLT20)	4
Malaysia (RIM)	2
Mexico Airplay (Billboard)	29
Netherlands (Dutch Top 40)	2
Netherlands (Single Top 100)	1
New Zealand (Recorded Music NZ)	1
Norway (VG-lista)	1
Portugal (AFP)	1
Scottish Singles Sales (Official Charts)	9
Singapore (RIAS)	14
Slovakia Singles Digital (ČNS IFPI)	2
Spain (Promusicae)	8
Sweden (Sverigetopplistan)	1
Switzerland (Schweizer Hitparade)	2
UK Singles (Official Charts)	1
UK Hip Hop/R&B (Official Charts)	1
US Billboard Hot 100	1
US Dance Club Songs (Billboard)	33
US Dance Airplay (Billboard)	7
US Hot R&B/Hip-Hop Songs (Billboard)	1
US Pop Airplay (Billboard)	4
US Rhythmic Airplay (Billboard)	1
Venezuela (National-Report)	81

=== Monthly charts ===
Monthly chart performance
Chart (2017)	Position
Brazil Streaming (Pro-Música)	21

=== Year-end charts ===
Year-end chart performance
Chart (2018)	Position
Australia (ARIA)	2
Austria (Ö3 Austria Top 40)	17
Belgium (Ultratop Flanders)	20
Belgium (Ultratop Wallonia)	28
Canada (Canadian Hot 100)	3
Denmark (Tracklisten)	7
Estonia (Eesti Tipp-40)	5
France (SNEP)	6
Germany (Official German Charts)	12
Ireland (IRMA)	3
Italy (FIMI)	26
New Zealand (Recorded Music NZ)	1
Netherlands (Dutch Top 40)	25
Netherlands (Single Top 100)	4
Portugal (AFP)	1
Spain (PROMUSICAE)	49
Sweden (Sverigetopplistan)	5
Switzerland (Schweizer Hitparade)	16
UK Singles (OCC)	2
US Billboard Hot 100	1
US Dance/Mix Show Airplay (Billboard)	25
US Hot R&B/Hip-Hop Songs (Billboard)	1
US Mainstream Top 40 (Billboard)	26
US Rhythmic (Billboard)	1
Worldwide (IFPI)	2

=== Decade-end charts ===
Decade-end chart performance
Chart (2010–2019)	Position
Australia (ARIA)	95
UK Singles (OCC)	59
US Billboard Hot 100	19
US Hot R&B/Hip-Hop Songs (Billboard)	10

=== All-time charts ===
All-time chart performance
Chart	Position
US Billboard Hot 100	83

== Certifications ==
Certifications and sales
Region	Certification	Certified units/sales
Australia (ARIA)	12× Platinum	840,000^{‡}
Austria (IFPI Austria)	Gold	15,000^{‡}
Belgium (BRMA)	Platinum	20,000^{‡}
Brazil (Pro-Música Brasil)	6× Diamond	1,500,000^{‡}
Canada (Music Canada)	Diamond	800,000^{‡}
Denmark (IFPI Danmark)	3× Platinum	270,000^{‡}
France (SNEP)	Diamond	333,333^{‡}
Germany (BVMI)	3× Gold	900,000^{‡}
Italy (FIMI)	3× Platinum	300,000^{‡}
Mexico (AMPROFON)	2× Platinum	120,000^{‡}
New Zealand (RMNZ)	7× Platinum	210,000^{‡}
Poland (ZPAV)	3× Platinum	150,000^{‡}
Portugal (AFP)	4× Platinum	40,000^{‡}
Spain (Promusicae)	3× Platinum	180,000^{‡}
United Kingdom (BPI)	5× Platinum	3,000,000^{‡}
United States (RIAA)	2× Diamond	20,000,000^{‡}
Streaming
Sweden (GLF)	Platinum	8,000,000^{†}
^{‡} Sales+streaming figures based on certification alone.^{†} Streaming-only figures based on certification alone.

== Release history ==
Release dates for "God's Plan"
Region	Date	Format	Label	Ref.
Various	January 19, 2018	Digital download	Young Money; Cash Money; Republic	
United States	January 23, 2018	Rhythmic contemporary	Young Money; Cash Money; Republic	
United States	January 30, 2018	Contemporary hit radio	Young Money; Cash Money; Republic	

== See also ==
- List of most expensive music videos
- List of most-streamed songs on Spotify
- List of number-one singles of 2018 (Australia)
- List of number-one urban singles of 2018 (Australia)
- List of Canadian Hot 100 number-one singles of 2018
- List of number-one hits of 2018 (Denmark)
- List of number-one hits of 2018 (Germany)
- List of number-one singles of 2018 (Ireland)
- List of number-one hits of 2018 (Italy)
- List of number-one singles from the 2010s (New Zealand)
- List of number-one songs in Norway
- List of number-one singles of 2018 (Portugal)
- List of number-one singles of the 2010s (Sweden)
- List of UK Singles Chart number ones of the 2010s
- List of UK R&B Singles Chart number ones of 2018
- List of Billboard Hot 100 number-one singles of 2018
- List of number-one digital songs of 2018 (U.S.)
- List of number-one R&B/hip-hop songs of 2018 (U.S.)
- List of Billboard Rhythmic number-one songs of the 2010s
- List of number-one Billboard Streaming Songs of 2018
- List of highest-certified singles in Australia
