= I Get the Bag =

Single by Gucci Mane featuring Migos

from the album Mr. Davis
- Released: August 18, 2017
- Studio: Atlanta, GA
- Genre: Trap
- Length: 3:27; 3:38 (radio edit); 3:53 (album version)
- Label: GUWOP; 1017; Atlantic
- Songwriters: Radric Davis; Quavious Marshall; Kirshnik Ball; Leland Wayne; Joshua Luellen
- Producers: Metro Boomin; Southside

Gucci Mane singles chronology
"That's What I Like (Remix)" (2017)	"I Get the Bag" (2017)	"Cool" (2018)

Migos singles chronology
"Night Call" (2017)	"I Get the Bag" (2017)	"MotorSport" (2017)

Music video
- "I Get the Bag" on YouTube

"I Get the Bag" is a song by American rapper Gucci Mane featuring American hip hop group Migos (two of its members, Quavo and Takeoff), released by 1017 and Atlantic Records on August 18, 2017, as the third single from Mane's eleventh studio album, Mr. Davis (2017). It was written by its performers alongside its producers, Metro Boomin and Southside.

== Background ==
"I Get the Bag" was first released as an instant grat track on August 18, 2017, for pre-orders of the album. It was then sent to urban radio on September 5, 2017, as the album's third single (second radio single).

"I Get the Bag" contains an interpolation of the artists' previous collaboration "Slippery" from Migos' Culture (2017).

== Music video ==
The music video was released alongside the single, with producer Metro Boomin making a cameo. It has over 661 million views as of November 2025.

== Commercial performance ==
"I Get the Bag" is Gucci Mane's highest-charting single as a lead artist (tied with "Wake Up in the Sky" in 2018). It peaked at number 11 on the Billboard Hot 100, charting for 16 weeks. It also peaked at number one on the Mediabase Urban Airplay chart. It is Gucci Mane's highest certified single, with sales over 8 million units in the US.

== Charts ==
=== Weekly charts ===
Chart (2017–2018)	Peak position
Canada (Canadian Hot 100)	28
Portugal (AFP)	89
Slovakia (Singles Digitál Top 100)	89
Sweden Heatseeker (Sverigetopplistan)	12
Switzerland (Schweizer Hitparade)	100
US Billboard Hot 100	11
US Hot R&B/Hip-Hop Songs (Billboard)	5
US Rhythmic Airplay (Billboard)	1

=== Year-end charts ===
Chart (2017)	Position
US Billboard Hot 100	93
US Hot R&B/Hip-Hop Songs (Billboard)	45
Chart (2018)	Position
US Billboard Hot 100	72
US Hot R&B/Hip-Hop Songs (Billboard)	40
US Rhythmic (Billboard)	32

== Certifications ==
Region	Certification	Certified units/sales
New Zealand (RMNZ)	Platinum	30,000^{‡}
United Kingdom (BPI)	Silver	200,000^{‡}
United States (RIAA)	8× Platinum	8,000,000^{‡}
^{‡} Sales+streaming figures based on certification alone.

== Release history ==
Region	Date	Format	Label	Ref.
United States	August 18, 2017 (Note: Release as a promotional single.)	Digital download	1017; Atlantic	
United States	September 5, 2017	Urban contemporary radio	1017; Atlantic	
