= Rockstar (Post Malone song) =

2017 single by Post Malone featuring 21 Savage

Single by Post Malone featuring 21 Savage

from the album Beerbongs & Bentleys
- Released: September 15, 2017
- Recorded: 2016
- Genre: Trap
- Length: 3:38 (album version); 3:12 (radio edit)
- Label: Republic
- Songwriters: Austin Post; Sheyaa Abraham-Joseph; Olufunmibi Awoshiley; Louis Bell; Carl Rosen; Jo-Vaughn Scott
- Producers: Tank God; Louis Bell

Post Malone singles chronology
"Congratulations" (2017)	"Rockstar" (2017)	"Homemade Dynamite (Remix)" (2017)

21 Savage singles chronology
"Bank Account" (2017)	"Rockstar" (2017)	"Pull Up N Wreck" (2017)

Music video
- "Rockstar" on YouTube

Latin remix cover

"Rockstar" (stylized in all lowercase) is a song by American musician Post Malone featuring British-American rapper 21 Savage. It was released on September 15, 2017, by Republic Records as the lead single from Malone's second studio album Beerbongs & Bentleys (2018). The song was written alongside Carl Rosen, Joey Bada$$, and producers Louis Bell and Tank God.

The track received mixed reviews from music critics, and became the artists' most successful hit single to date, reaching number one on the US Billboard Hot 100, and reaching the top spot in several other countries, including Australia, Canada, Greece, Portugal, Romania, Ireland, New Zealand, Sweden, Norway, Finland, Denmark and the United Kingdom. It became both Post Malone and 21 Savage's first number-one single in all the countries mentioned. The song was nominated for Record of the Year and Best Rap/Sung Performance at the 61st Annual Grammy Awards.

Post Malone posted a snippet of himself playing the track in the studio via Twitter on December 24, 2016.

== Music videos ==
The now-private unofficial YouTube video for the track's audio, released by Republic Records, is a three-minute-and-38-second loop of solely the song's chorus. Therefore, the song was able to receive equivalent downloads without featuring the entirety of the song, which some attributed to its number-one spot on the Hot 100. Some called it a "clever marketing scheme", while others believed it was a trick or a loophole.

The official music video, directed by Emil Nava, was released on Post Malone's Vevo YouTube channel on November 21, 2017. The video features Post Malone in a room fighting against a gang of men with samurai swords, and ends with Post Malone and 21 Savage covered in blood. Pitchfork noted that the video references the Japanese action film Lady Snowblood. On June 23, 2022, after nearly five years on YouTube, the video hit one billion views.

== Commercial performance ==
The song reached number one on the US Billboard Hot 100, becoming Post Malone and 21 Savage's first number-one song. It debuted at number two behind Cardi B's "Bodak Yellow", breaking the single week streaming record on Apple Music with over 25 million streams, becoming Post Malone's third top 20 hit, following his debut single, "White Iverson" and his second top 10 hit after "Congratulations". It stayed behind "Bodak Yellow" for three consecutive weeks before reaching the top spot in its fourth week. "Rockstar" topped the Hot 100 for eight weeks, the longest run at number one for a hip-hop song in 2017. After its eighth week at number one, it was knocked off by "Perfect" by Ed Sheeran and Beyoncé. The single has sold over 10,000,000 copies, being certified Diamond in the US.

In New Zealand, it debuted at number four, then moved to the top spot the following week, staying at the summit for eight weeks.

In Australia, it topped the ARIA Singles Chart for seven weeks.

In 21 Savage's native United Kingdom, "Rockstar" debuted at number five on the UK Singles Chart on September 22, 2017. The following week, it rose three places to number two, behind Sam Smith's "Too Good at Goodbyes", before reaching the top of the chart on October 6, 2017.

In September 2020, "Rockstar" became the second song ever, after Ed Sheeran's "Shape of You", to surpass two billion streams on the audio platform Spotify.

== Critical reception ==
"Rockstar" received mixed reviews from music critics. Spin.com reviewed the song's unofficial video by stating: "The chorus loop may be a weirdly hypnotic, post-Vine marketing gimmick, but it seems like it worked. "rockstar" is both Post Malone's and 21 Savage's first-ever No. 1 single, meaning this probably won't be the last time an artist attempts to boost a track by distilling its catchiest section into a standalone product. Maybe, in the future, we'll all listen to seconds-long hooks on endless extended loops". Spin and Time both named the song one of the worst of 2017.

== Remixes ==
On November 29, 2017, an unofficial Crankdat remix of the song was released on the Trap Nation channel on YouTube. On December 13, 2017, a Latin remix of the song featuring Dominican-Puerto Rican reggaeton artists Nicky Jam and Ozuna was released. Another remix was released on December 22, 2017, featuring new verses from rappers Jadakiss and Nino Man. On December 25, 2017, Lil Wayne released his remix of the song, titled "5 Star" featuring Nicki Minaj, as a single from his mixtape Dedication 6. On January 23, 2018, American rapper Fetty Wap released his remix of the song.

== Charts ==
=== Weekly charts ===
Weekly chart performance
Chart (2017–2019)	Peak position
Australia (ARIA)	1
Australian Urban (ARIA)	1
Austria (Ö3 Austria Top 40)	1
Belarus Airplay (Eurofest)	9
Belgium (Ultratop 50 Flanders)	5
Belgium (Ultratop 50 Wallonia)	3
Brazil Hot Streaming (Pro-Música Brasil)	23
Bulgaria Airplay (PROPHON)	7
Canada Hot 100 (Billboard)	1
CIS Airplay (TopHit)	2
Czech Republic Airplay (ČNS IFPI)	98
Czech Republic Singles Digital (ČNS IFPI)	1
Denmark (Tracklisten)	1
Ecuador (National-Report)	34
Finland (Suomen virallinen lista)	1
France (SNEP)	5
Germany (GfK)	2
Greece Digital (Billboard)	1
Hungary (Single Top 40)	6
Hungary (Stream Top 40)	1
Ireland (IRMA)	1
Italy (FIMI)	2
Latvia (DigiTop100)	1
Lebanon Airplay (Lebanese Top 20)	4
Malaysia (RIM)	11
Mexico Airplay (Billboard)	37
Netherlands (Dutch Top 40)	4
Netherlands (Single Top 100)	2
New Zealand (Recorded Music NZ)	1
Norway (VG-lista)	1
Philippines (Philippine Hot 100)	23
Poland Airplay (ZPAV)	22
Portugal (AFP)	1
Romania (Airplay 100)	1
Romania Airplay (Media Forest)	1
Russia Airplay (TopHit)	3
Scotland Singles (OCC)	10
Slovakia Singles Digital (ČNS IFPI)	1
Spain (PROMUSICAE)	16
Sweden (Sverigetopplistan)	1
Switzerland (Schweizer Hitparade)	2
UK Singles (OCC)	1
Ukraine Airplay (TopHit)	2
US Billboard Hot 100	1
US Hot R&B/Hip-Hop Songs (Billboard)	1
US Dance/Mix Show Airplay (Billboard)	7
US Pop Airplay (Billboard)	5
US Rhythmic Airplay (Billboard)	1

Weekly chart performance
Chart (2025)	Peak position
Moldova Airplay (TopHit)	98

=== Year-end charts ===
Year-end chart performance
Chart (2017)	Position
Australia (ARIA)	16
Austria (Ö3 Austria Top 40)	26
Belgium (Ultratop Flanders)	94
Brazil (Pro-Música Brasil)	142
Canada (Canadian Hot 100)	38
Denmark (Tracklisten)	15
France (SNEP)	44
Germany (Official German Charts)	21
Hungary (Single Top 40)	58
Hungary (Stream Top 40)	21
Iceland (Tónlistinn)	28
Italy (FIMI)	59
Netherlands (Dutch Top 40)	40
Netherlands (Single Top 100)	44
New Zealand (Recorded Music NZ)	13
Portugal (AFP)	13
Sweden (Sverigetopplistan)	16
Switzerland (Schweizer Hitparade)	49
UK Singles (Official Charts Company)	22
US Billboard Hot 100	56
US Hot R&B/Hip-Hop Songs (Billboard)	27
US Rhythmic (Billboard)	48

Year-end chart performance
Chart (2018)	Position
Australia (ARIA)	12
Austria (Ö3 Austria Top 40)	35
Belgium (Ultratop Flanders)	55
Belgium (Ultratop Wallonia)	21
Canada (Canadian Hot 100)	4
CIS (Tophit)	14
Denmark (Tracklisten)	20
Estonia (IFPI)	3
France (SNEP)	36
Germany (Official German Charts)	21
Hungary (Single Top 40)	39
Ireland (IRMA)	19
Italy (FIMI)	70
Netherlands (Single Top 100)	67
New Zealand (Recorded Music NZ)	9
Portugal (AFP)	6
Romania (Airplay 100)	2
Russia (Tophit)	22
Sweden (Sverigetopplistan)	8
Switzerland (Schweizer Hitparade)	18
UK Singles (Official Charts Company)	24
US Billboard Hot 100	5
US Hot R&B/Hip-Hop Songs (Billboard)	6
US Dance/Mix Show Airplay (Billboard)	38
US Mainstream Top 40 (Billboard)	32
US Rhythmic (Billboard)	11

Year-end chart performance
Chart (2019)	Position
Australia (ARIA)	80
Latvia (LAIPA)	30
Portugal (AFP)	109
US Rolling Stone Top 100	73

=== Decade-end charts ===
Decade-end chart performance
Chart (2010–2019)	Position
Australia (ARIA)	34
Germany (Official German Charts)	46
UK Singles (Official Charts Company)	50
US Billboard Hot 100	23
US Hot R&B/Hip-Hop Songs (Billboard)	6

=== All-time charts ===
Chart (1958–2021)	Position
US Billboard Hot 100	97

== Certifications ==
Certifications
Region	Certification	Certified units/sales
Australia (ARIA)	14× Platinum	980,000^{‡}
Austria (IFPI Austria)	Gold	15,000^{‡}
Belgium (BRMA)	2× Platinum	40,000^{‡}
Brazil (Pro-Música Brasil)	3× Diamond	750,000^{‡}
Canada (Music Canada)	Diamond	800,000^{‡}
Denmark (IFPI Danmark)	4× Platinum	360,000^{‡}
France (SNEP)	Diamond	233,333^{‡}
Germany (BVMI)	3× Platinum	1,200,000^{‡}
Italy (FIMI)	4× Platinum	200,000^{‡}
Mexico (AMPROFON)	Diamond+2× Platinum+Gold	450,000^{‡}
Netherlands (NVPI)	4× Platinum	160,000^{‡}
New Zealand (RMNZ)	9× Platinum	270,000^{‡}
Norway (IFPI Norway)	4× Platinum	240,000^{‡}
Poland (ZPAV)	3× Platinum	150,000^{‡}
Portugal (AFP)	6× Platinum	60,000^{‡}
Spain (Promusicae)	2× Platinum	120,000^{‡}
United Kingdom (BPI)	5× Platinum	3,000,000^{‡}
United States (RIAA)	Diamond	10,000,000^{‡}
Streaming
Sweden (GLF)	7× Platinum	56,000,000^{†}
^{‡} Sales+streaming figures based on certification alone.^{†} Streaming-only figures based on certification alone.

== Release history ==
Release dates for "Rockstar"
Country	Date	Format	Label
United States	September 15, 2017	Digital download	Republic
United States	September 26, 2017	Rhythmic contemporary	Republic
United States	September 26, 2017	Contemporary hit radio	Republic

== See also ==
- List of highest-certified singles in Australia
- List of number-one singles of 2017 (Australia)
- List of Canadian Hot 100 number-one singles of 2017
- List of number-one hits of 2017 (Denmark)
- List of number-one singles of 2017 (Finland)
- List of number-one singles of 2017 (Ireland)
- List of number-one singles from the 2010s (New Zealand)
- List of number-one songs in Norway
- List of number-one singles of the 2010s (Sweden)
- List of Airplay 100 number ones
- List of UK Singles Chart number ones of the 2010s
- List of Billboard Hot 100 number ones of 2017
