= Andro (album) =

Studio album by Tommy Lee
- Released: October 16, 2020
- Recorded: 2020
- Studio: Lee's basement
- Genres: Hip-hop; EDM; funk; R&B
- Length: 36:33
- Label: Better Noise
- Producer: Tommy Lee

Tommy Lee chronology
Tommyland: The Ride (2005)	Andro (2020)

Singles from Andro
- 1. "Knock Me Down" Released: 2020; 2. "Tops" Released: 2020; 3. "Demon Bitches" Released: 2020; 4. "Tommy Lee (Tommy Lee Remix)" Released: 2020

Professional ratings
Review scores
Source	Rating
Kerrang!	3/5 stars

Andro is the third solo album by American rock musician Tommy Lee, and his first solo album in 15 years following the release of Tommyland: The Ride. It was released on October 16, 2020.

== Background ==
Lee plays drums, produces, and provides background vocals on the album, but each track has a guest lead vocalist. These include Post Malone, Shotty Horroh, and Mickey Avalon.

== Track listing ==
No.	Title	Featured guest	Length
1.	"Knock Me Down"	Killvein	2:31
2.	"You Dancy"	Lukas Rossi	2:00
3.	"Ain't Telling Me Nothing"	PAV4N	2:19
4.	"Soma Coma"	Shotty Horroh	2:22
5.	"When You Were Mine" (Prince cover)	Lukas Rossi	3:37
6.	"Hot Fudge Sundae" (skit)	Josh Todd	0:33
7.	"Caviar on a Paper Plate"	Mickey Avalon	2:14
8.	"Leave Me Alone"	Killvein	1:59
9.	"Demon Bitches"	Brooke Candy, Moon Bounce	3:04
10.	"P.R.E.T.T.Y."	King Elle Noir	3:45
11.	"Tops"	Push Push	2:27
12.	"Make This Storm"	King Elle Noir	2:38
13.	"Make It Back"	PLYA	3:13
14.	"Tommy Lee" (Tommy Lee Remix)	Post Malone, Tyla Yaweh	3:51
Total length:			36:33

== Charts ==
Chart (2020)	Peak position
Scottish Albums (Official Charts)	88
UK Independent Albums (Official Charts)	37
US Billboard 200	76
