= Tyla Yaweh =

American rapper (born 1995)

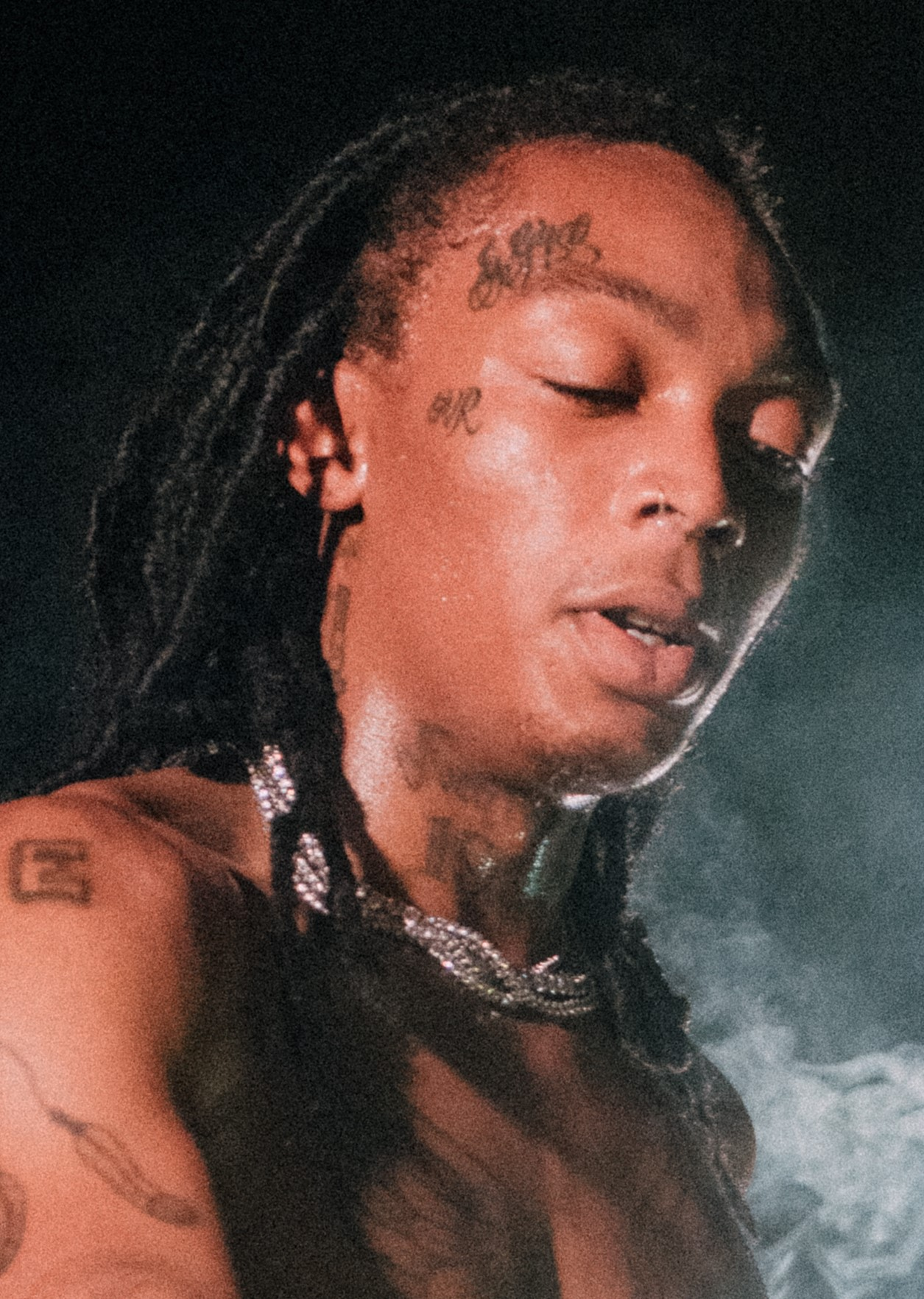
- Yaweh performing in 2018

Background information
- Born: Tyler Jamal Brown; May 31, 1995 (age 31); Orlando, Florida, U.S.
- Origin: Los Angeles, California, U.S.
- Genres: Pop rap; trap; pop; R&B
- Occupations: Rapper; singer; songwriter
- Labels: Rager Boy; Epic; London; NoCopyrightSounds
- Website: tylayaweh.com

Tyler Jamal Brown (born May 31, 1995), known professionally as Tyla Yaweh, is an American rapper, singer, and songwriter. He was discovered by singer Post Malone and led to sign with his manager, Dre London's London Entertainment, an imprint of Epic Records in 2019. Brown is best known for his 2020 singles "High Right Now" (featuring Wiz Khalifa) and "Tommy Lee" (featuring Post Malone)—both received platinum certifications by the Recording Industry Association of America (RIAA), while the latter peaked at number 65 of the Billboard Hot 100. His debut studio album, Heart Full of Rage (2019) and its sequel, Heart Full of Rage 2 (2023) were both met with mixed critical reception and failed to chart domestically.

== Early life ==
Tyler Jamal Brown was born on May 31, 1995, in Orlando, Florida. He grew up in Orlando, in a rough neighborhood, and was quoted saying, "I’ve been on my own since I was 14. I saw the streets, I saw everything that came out of Orlando... it taught me life." He initially supported himself by working at a local Dunkin' Donuts until he was evicted by his mother for criminal behavior.

== Career ==
After arriving in Los Angeles, California, he was discovered by Post Malone and his manager Dre London, who went on to sign him to their record label London Entertainment, in conjunction with Epic Records.

Yaweh's single "Drugs and Pain" was released on November 22, 2017, and was followed by the singles "Wildlife", "Gemini", and "Goals", the latter featuring Preme, all released throughout 2018. All three tracks performed well, achieving millions of streams across Spotify, YouTube, and SoundCloud. He then released another single entitled "She Bad" in October 2018.

Yaweh released his debut mixtape Heart Full of Rage on February 22, 2019. After the Runaway Tour began on September 14, 2019, Yaweh released a single with YG called "I Think I Luv Her" on September 27, 2019. He released a remix of the song "High Right Now" on January 24, 2020, that featured Wiz Khalifa with a music video that included appearances by Post Malone, Billie Joe Armstrong, and Big Sean. He has also performed at festivals such as SXSW, Rolling Loud, and Made in America as well as touring Australia and Europe. He toured with Post Malone and Swae Lee on the Runaway Tour for both legs during fall 2019 and winter 2020, until the tour was halted near the end of the second leg due to the COVID-19 pandemic. Yaweh confirmed a second album is due to be released sometime in early 2021.

On June 12, 2020, Yaweh released the lead single, "Tommy Lee", which features Post Malone, for his second album, Rager Boy. The track was released on all digital platforms and was followed soon after with an accompanying music video. It became Yaweh's first career Hot 100 entry, debuting at number 65. The track was followed up with a remix, released July 10, 2020, featuring drums from Tommy Lee himself, as well as a re-recorded guitar instrumental. A second remix featuring Saint Jhn was released subsequently.

Yaweh was joined by DaBaby on the track "Stuntin' on You", released on July 17, 2020. They both appear in its accompanying music video. The song was later remixed with verses by DDG and Dame D.O.L.L.A. and is walk up song for MLB outfielder Mookie Betts. New single entitled "All the Smoke" was released by Yaweh, with appearances by Gunna and Wiz Khalifa.

On May 14, 2021, Yaweh featured on South Korean rapper B.I's single "Got It Like That" which also features American singer Destiny Rogers.

== Discography ==
=== Studio albums ===
Title	Album details	Peak chart positions	
Title	Album details	AUS	NLD
Heart Full of Rage	Released: February 22, 2019; Label: Epic, London; Formats: Digital download, streaming	85	173
Heart Full of Rage 2	Released: August 4, 2023; Label: Epic, London; Formats: Digital download, streaming	—	—
I Can Be Petty Too	Released: July 4, 2025; Label: Rager Boy; Formats: Digital download, streaming	—	—
"—" denotes a recording that did not chart or was not released in that territory.

=== Singles ===
List of singles, showing selected chart positions, year released and album name
Title	Year	Peak chart positions								Certifications	Album
Title	Year	US	US R&B/HH	AUS	CAN	IRE	NZ Hot	SWE	UK	Certifications	Album
"Drugs and Pain"	2017	—	—	—	—	—	—	—	—		Non-album single
"Gemini"	2018	— (Note: "Gemini" did not enter the Billboard Hot 100, but peaked at number 18 on the Rap Digital Song Sales chart.)	—	—	—	—	—	—	—		Heart Full of Rage
"She Bad"	2018	—	—	—	—	—	—	—	—		Non-album singles
"I Think I Luv Her" (featuring YG)	2019	—	—	88	—	—	—	—	—		Non-album singles
"Understand Me"	2019	—	—	—	—	—	—	—	—		Non-album singles
"High Right Now" (featuring Wiz Khalifa)	2020	—	—	—	—	—	—	—	—	RIAA: Platinum; RMNZ: Gold	Heart Full of Rage
"Tommy Lee" (featuring Post Malone)	2020	65	30	93	37	49	4	92	56	RIAA: Platinum; MC: Platinum; RMNZ: Gold	Non-album singles
"Stuntin' on You" (featuring DaBaby)	2020	—	—	—	—	—	13	—	—	RIAA: Gold; RMNZ: Gold	Non-album singles
"All the Smoke" (featuring Gunna and Wiz Khalifa or remix also featuring Elias or Landy)	2020	—	—	—	—	—	38	—	—		Non-album singles
"Back Outside"	2021	—	—	—	—	—	—	—	—		Non-album singles
"Hands Up" (featuring Morray)	2021	—	—	—	—	—	—	—	—		Non-album singles
"Do No Wrong" featuring Trippie Redd and PnB Rock)	2022	—	—	—	—	—	—	—	—		Non-album singles
"Sex Symbol"	2022	—	—	—	—	—	—	—	—		Non-album singles
"Mile High"	2022	—	—	—	—	—	—	—	—		Non-album singles
"Summer Vibes"	2023	—	—	—	—	—	—	—	—		Heart Full of Rage 2
"—" denotes a recording that did not chart or was not released in that territory.
