= While the World Was Burning =

Studio album by Saint Jhn
- Released: November 20, 2020
- Recorded: 2020
- Genre: Hip hop
- Length: 43:49
- Labels: GØDD COMPLEXx; Hitco; WMG
- Producers: Fallen; Mars; Murda Beatz; Ronny J; ShadyBoy; Ghostrage; Quay Global; Johan Lenox; Imanbek

Saint Jhn chronology
Ghetto Lenny's Love Songs (2019)	While the World Was Burning (2020)

Singles from While the World Was Burning
- 1. "Roses (Imanbek remix)" Released: September 18, 2019; 2. "Gorgeous" Released: October 9, 2020; 3. "Sucks to Be You" Released: October 26, 2020; 4. "Smack Dvd" Released: November 27, 2020

Professional ratings
Review scores
Source	Rating
Pitchfork	5.7/10

While the World Was Burning is the third studio album by American rapper Saint Jhn. It was released on November 20, 2020, by Gødd Complexx under Hitco, and marketed digitally via ADA division of Warner Music Group. It features guest appearances from Kanye West, Lil Uzi Vert, Future, A Boogie wit da Hoodie, DaBaby, JID, 6Lack and Kehlani.

== Background ==
Originally Saint Jhn had no plans to release another album in 2020, but throughout the year he managed to connect with fellow artists Kanye West, Lil Uzi Vert, Future, JID, A Boogie wit da Hoodie. and Kehlani. His single "Roses" also gained massive attention over the summer and reached the top 5 on the Billboard and other charts. Because of this, he felt "it would be irresponsible to not put out another collection". The title While the World Was Burning was inspired by the events that unfolded in 2020 such as the COVID-19 pandemic, the George Floyd protests, the 2020 US election, etc. Saint Jhn calls the album a capsule collection.

In late September, Saint Jhn visited Kanye West in Wyoming. In several interviews after the release of the collection, Saint Jhn said that West had gotten a hold of his number after having heard his song "Roses" 20 times in a row on a jet plane. West wanted him to come to Wyoming and record with him there and threw out the idea that he could executive produce While the World Was Burning with Rick Rubin. Saint Jhn and West later flew down to Jamaica to record with Buju Banton.

The songs "High School Reunion" and "Monica Lewinsky, Election Year" are reworked versions of songs from his 2019 album Ghetto Lenny's Love Songs.

== Release and promotion ==
After getting massive success with the remix of his single "Roses" over the summer of 2020, Saint Jhn teased on August 25 on a (now deleted) Instagram post that he would release a collection of songs in October. In mid September, Saint Jhn announced that his album While The World Was Burning would release on October 16. On October 9, Saint Jhn would release the lead single "Gorgeous". The day after, he went to Twitter to announce that he had delayed the album to November 20. On October 26, Saint Jhn released the single "Sucks to Be You", and two days later the cover art, release date and track listing for the album.

On November 21, a day after the release, Saint Jhn said on Twitter that the album would be updated with some tweaks and changes and a song with Kanye West that did not make the cut. The missing track titled "Smack DVD" featuring Kanye West was released a week later, however it did not get added onto the track listing of the album. Saint Jhn posted a track listing of a different version of the album to his Twitter with "Smack DVD" after "Pray 4 Me", among other track listing differences. The album was updated on streaming services to have the new track order with "Smack DVD" in the track listing a week later.

== Track listing ==
Track listing and credits adapted from Tidal.

No.	Title	Producer(s)	Length
1.	"Sucks to Be You"	Fallen	3:42
2.	"Switching Sides"	Mars; Murda Beatz	3:36
3.	"Freedom Is Priceless"	Ghostrage; Fallen	1:59
4.	"Roses Remix" (featuring Future)	Quay Global; Fallen	3:07
5.	"Monica Lewinsky, Election Year" (featuring A Boogie wit da Hoodie and DaBaby)	Fallen	3:30
6.	"High School Reunion, Prom" (featuring Lil Uzi Vert)	Quay Global; Fallen	3:24
7.	"Pray 4 Me" (featuring Kanye West)	Fallen	2:53
8.	"Smack DVD" (featuring Kanye West)	Ronny J; Shadyboy	2:55
9.	"Time for Demons"	Fallen	2:16
10.	"Gorgeous"	Fallen	3:05
11.	"Quarantine Wifey" (featuring JID)	Fallen	3:54
12.	"Ransom" (featuring 6lack and Kehlani)	Fallen	3:23
13.	"Back on the Ledge"	Johan Lenox; Fallen	3:05
14.	"Roses" (Imanbek Remix)	Imanbek	2:51
Total length:			43:49

== Personnel ==
- Saint Jhn – vocals
- Colin Leonard – mastering
- Roark Bailey – mixing (tracks 1–4, 6–12)
- Lee Stashenko – mixing (track 4)
- Erik Madrid – mixing (track 5)
- Fallen – mixing (track 10)
- Future – vocals (track 4)
- A Boogie wit da Hoodie – vocals (track 5)
- DaBaby – vocals (track 5)
- Lil Uzi Vert – vocals (track 6)
- Kanye West – vocals (tracks 7, 8)
- Lee Stashensko – arrangement, orchestration (track 11)
- Giaks – vocals (track 11)
- JID – vocals (track 11)
- 6lack – vocals (track 12)
- Kehlani – vocals (track 12)
- Imanbek – remixing (track 14)

== Charts ==
Chart performance of While the World Was Burning
Chart (2020)	Peak position
Canadian Albums (Billboard)	24
US Billboard 200	34
US Top R&B/Hip-Hop Albums (Billboard)	16
