= Tommyland: The Ride =

Studio album by Tommy Lee
- Released: August 9, 2005
- Recorded: 2004–2005
- Genre: Hard rock; alternative rock; post-grunge
- Length: 38:36
- Label: TL Education Services Inc.
- Producer: Scott Humphrey, Tommy Lee

Tommy Lee chronology
Never a Dull Moment (2002)	Tommyland: The Ride (2005)	Andro (2020)

Singles from Tommyland: The Ride
- 1. "Tryin to Be Me" Released: 2005; 2. "Good Times" Released: 2005; 3. "Hello, Again" Released: 2005; 4. "Make Believe" Released: 2006

Professional ratings
Review scores
Source	Rating
About.com	3/5 stars
Allmusic	link
PopMatters	link
Rolling Stone	link
Starpulse.com	2.5/5 stars

Tommyland: The Ride is the second solo album by American rock musician Tommy Lee. It was released in 2005 on TL Education Services Inc.

== Background ==
Tommyland: The Ride was released in conjunction with Lee's book of the same name, as well as his then new reality television series Tommy Lee Goes to College, which premiered a week after the album was released. The album features tracks from the show. Among these is the first single "Tryin to Be Me" and the second single "Good Times", which is the theme song for the series. The first three singles: "Tryin to Be Me", "Good Times" and "Hello Again" all featured Music videos.

Several other musicians also make guest appearances, including Butch Walker on "Good Times", Chad Kroeger on the first single "Tryin to Be Me", and Nick Carter on "Say Goodbye".

== Track listing ==
No.	Title	Featured guest	Length
1.	"Good Times" (Tommy Lee Goes to College theme song)	Butch Walker	3:06
2.	"Hello, Again"	Andrew McMahon	4:04
3.	"Tryin to Be Me"	Chad Kroeger	3:33
4.	"Sister Mary"	Carl Bell	3:27
5.	"The Butler" (skit)		0:37
6.	"Tired"	Joel Madden	3:25
7.	"I Need You"	Andrew McMahon	3:09
8.	"Make Believe"	Crispin Earl	3:04
9.	"Makin Me Crazy"	Dirty Harry	3:49
10.	"Watch You Lose"	Crispin Earl	2:39
11.	"Say Goodbye"	Nick Carter	3:36
12.	"Hello, Again" (Acoustic version)	Bonus track	4:02

== Personnel ==
- Tommy Lee – drums, producer, vocals, background vocals
- Scott Humphrey – guitar, keyboards, mixing, producer
- Andrew McMahon – piano, vocals
- Phil X – lead guitar, background vocals
- Deryck Whibley – guitar
- Dave Navarro – lead guitar
- Nick Lashley – guitar
- Carl Bell – lead guitar
- Bobby "Raw" Anderson – guitar
- Chad Kroeger – guitar
- Tim Dawson – guitar
- Chris Chaney – bass guitar
- Patrick Warren – keyboards
- Carla Kihlstedt – violin
- Matt Sorum – background vocals
- Joel Madden – co lead vocals on "Tired"
- Butch Walker – vocals, guitar, bass
- Will Campagna – guitar
- Tommy Mac – bass guitar
- Crispin Earl – vocals/backing vocals, guitar, drums
- Randy Staub – mixing
- Tom Baker – mastering
- Chris Baseford – engineer

== Charts ==
Album

Chart (2005–2006)	Peak position
Australian Albums (ARIA)	94
UK Rock & Metal Albums (OCC)	37
US Billboard 200	62

Singles

Year	Single	Chart	Position
2005	"Tryin to Be Me"	Mainstream Rock Tracks	26
2005	"Good Times"	Billboard Hot 100	95
