= Tommy Lee Goes to College =

- Created by: BT, Brad Wyman
- Starring: Tommy Lee, Matt Ellis, & Natalie Riedmann
- Theme music composer: BT
- Country of origin: United States
- No. of episodes: 6

Production
- Executive producers: Richard Bishop, BT, Eddie October
- Producer: Tommy Lee
- Running time: 30 minutes
- Production companies: Eddie October Productions, bcubed, NBC Universal Television Studio

Original release
- Network: NBC
- Release: August 16 – September 13, 2005

Tommy Lee Goes to College is an NBC reality television miniseries that began broadcasting on Tuesday, August 16, 2005 and on VH1 on Friday, August 19, 2005. It features Mötley Crüe drummer Tommy Lee attending the University of Nebraska and attempting to fit into its lifestyle. It was co-produced by Lee, totaling six episodes.

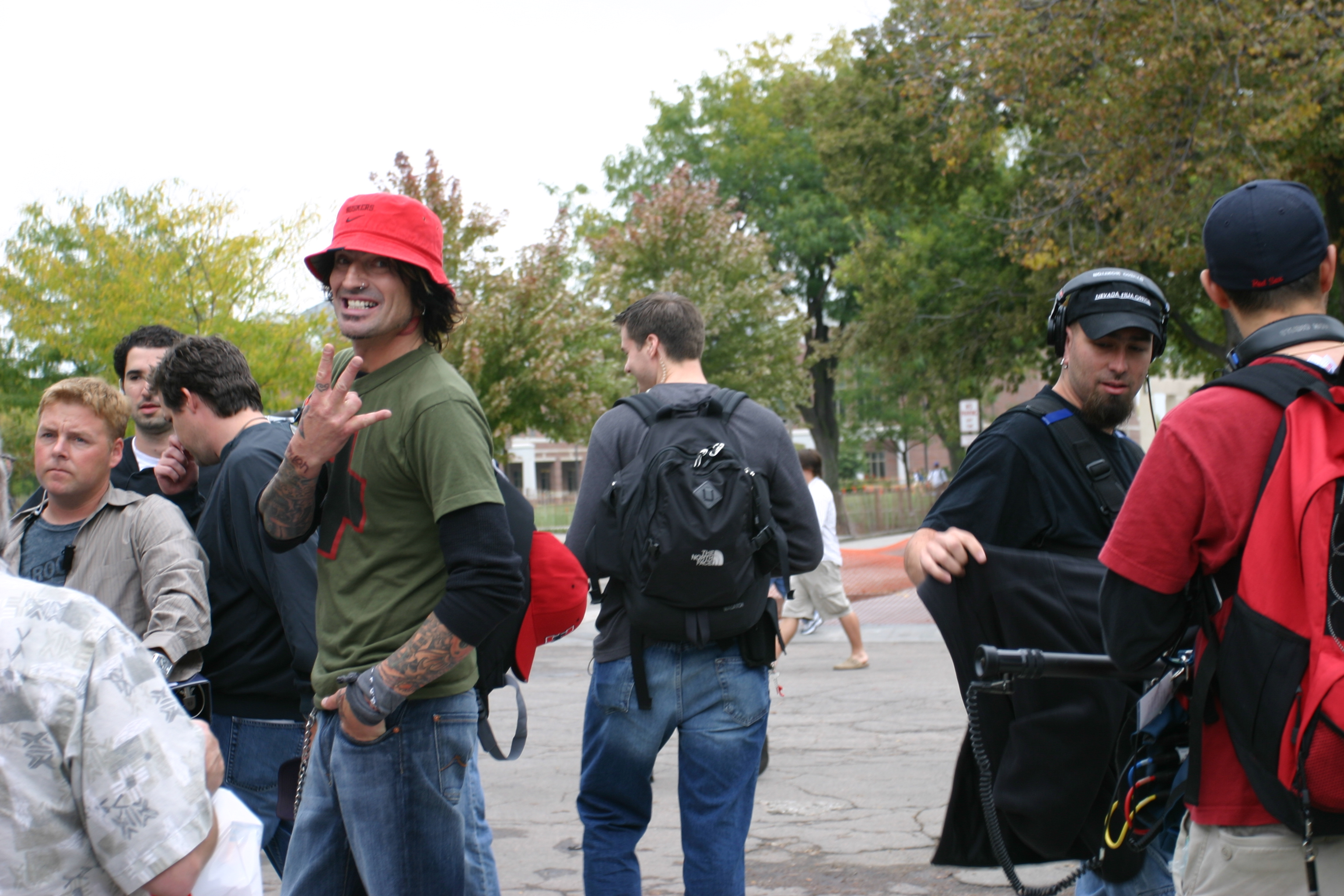
Tommy Lee on UNL campus in 2004

== Background ==
The show features Lee, who is a high-school dropout, facing collegiate challenges like finding a roommate, trying out for athletic teams and marching band, trying to join a fraternity, and studying chemistry. Lee starts a fraternity called "House of Lee", with its own residential house, and its newly recruited members breaking into the art museum at night to vandalize and install their own artwork.

The show is considered a "reality show", but certain aspects were scripted. Contrary to what is shown, there were casting calls for parts in the show. It was also later revealed that the "dorm room" in which Lee stayed was in an off-campus site made to look like a college dorm room. A disclaimer at the end of the show revealed that while Lee attended classes, he did not enroll at the University of Nebraska and that certain situations were staged or edited for comedic effect.

The administration of the University of Nebraska–Lincoln decided to host the reality show to market the university for recruiting and public relations purposes.

== Soundtrack ==
The theme song for "Tommy Lee Goes to College" is the song "Good Times", which was the second single from Lee's second solo album Tommyland: The Ride, which was released a week before the series premiered. The album is the soundtrack to the series and to Lee's book Tommyland, which was also released in 2005.

== Cast ==
- Tommy Lee as himself
- Matt Ellis as Tommy's roommate. Ellis never attended the campus casting call, but was cast after producers met him working at a local bar. He was a senior at the university during filming and graduated later that same semester.
- Natalie Riedmann as Tommy's tutor
