= Collection One =

Studio album by Saint Jhn
- Released: March 30, 2018
- Recorded: 2016–2017
- Genre: Hip-hop
- Length: 44:35
- Label: GØDD COMPLEXx; Hitco

Saint Jhn chronology
Collection One (2018)	Ghetto Lenny's Love Songs (2019)

Singles from Collection One
- 1. "Roses" Released: July 22, 2016; 2. "Some Nights" Released: September 8, 2017; 3. "Nigga Shit (Swoosh)" Released: March 29, 2018

Collection One is the debut studio album by American rapper Saint Jhn. It was released on March 30, 2018, by Gødd Complexx under Hitco. The album peaked at No. 50 on the Billboard 200 and No. 7 on the Canadian albums chart in 2020.

== Track listing ==
No.	Title	Length
1.	"Lust" (with Janelle Kroll)	2:46
2.	"3 Below"	3:11
3.	"Surf Club"	4:00
4.	"Roses"	2:53
5.	"Reflex"	4:01
6.	"God Bless the Internet"	3:49
7.	"Selfish"	3:54
8.	"God Bless the Ratchets"	3:41
9.	"Nigga Shit (Swoosh) (censored N***a Sh*t (Swoosh))"	3:07
10.	"Traci Lords"	3:07
11.	"Brilliant Bitch"	3:04
12.	"Some Nights (Extended)"	3:45
13.	"I Heard You Got Too Litt Last Night"	3:17

== Charts ==
=== Weekly charts ===
Weekly chart performance of Collection One
Chart (2018–2020)	Peak position
Canadian Albums (Billboard)	7
US Billboard 200	50
US Top R&B/Hip-Hop Albums (Billboard)	31

=== Year-end charts ===
Year-end chart performance of Collection One
Chart (2020)	Position
Canadian Albums (Billboard)	37
US Billboard 200	140
US Top R&B/Hip-Hop Albums (Billboard)	55
