= Roses (Saint Jhn song) =

2016 song by Saint Jhn

Single by Saint Jhn

from the album Collection One
- Released: July 22, 2016
- Genre: Hip hop
- Length: 2:53
- Label: Godd Complexx; Hitco
- Songwriters: Carlos Phillips; Lee Stashenko
- Producer: Fallen

Music video
- "Roses" on YouTube

"Roses (Imanbek remix)"
- Imanbek remix cover

Single by Saint Jhn

from the album While the World Was Burning
- Released: September 18, 2019
- Genre: Slap house
- Length: 2:56
- Label: Godd Complexx; Hitco; Effective
- Songwriters: Carlos Phillips; Lee Stashenko
- Producers: Imanbek; Fallen

Saint Jhn singles chronology
"Anything Can Happen" (2019)	"Roses (Imanbek remix)" (2019)	"I Can Fvcking Tell" (2020)

Imanbek singles chronology
"Roses (Imanbek remix)" (2019)	"Hot (Imanbek remix)" (2019)

Music video
- "Roses (Imanbek Remix)" on YouTube

"Roses" is a song by Guyanese-American rapper Saint Jhn, originally released on July 22, 2016 and later included on his 2018 album Collection One. Originally produced by Fallen, it was remixed by Kazakh producer Imanbek and released as a single on September 18, 2019. The remix of the song helped the song gain international recognition after it was featured on a Snapchat filter and on video-sharing app TikTok where it received over 4.5 billion plays in the month of April 2020. On May 27, 2020, a second remix produced by Quay Global and Fallen was released with American rapper Future. On July 20, 2020, a music video was released for the second remix. The remix's music video budget was bumped to help bail funds for arrested protesters and aid black-owned businesses and the Black Lives Matter movement, all regarding the George Floyd protests that started during May 2020.

On July 17, 2020, a second version of the Imanbek remix was released, featuring an extra verse by Jhn and a featured verse by Colombian singer J Balvin.

== Production ==
The 19-year-old Kazakh DJ and music producer, Imanbek, remixed the song in early 2019; it was officially released as a single in October 2019 through Effective Records, B1 Recordings and Godd Complexx/Hitco. The vocals heard in this remix are more higher-pitched than the original version.

== Commercial performance ==
Following the release of the Imanbek remix, "Roses" peaked at number four on the Billboard Hot 100. Outside of the United States, "Roses" topped the charts in Australia, Canada, Ireland, and the United Kingdom.

== Awards and nominations ==
Original
Year	Organization	Award	Result	Ref.
2020	MTV Video Music Awards	Song of Summer	Nominated	
2021	Grammy Awards	Best Remixed Recording, Non-Classical	Won	

== Charts ==
=== Weekly charts ===
Chart (2019–2021)	Peak position
Argentina (Argentina Hot 100)	23
Australia (ARIA) Imanbek Remix	1
Austria (Ö3 Austria Top 40) Imanbek Remix	2
Belgium (Ultratop 50 Flanders) Imanbek Remix	3
Belgium (Ultratop 50 Wallonia) Imanbek Remix	1
Brazil (UBC)	8
Canada Hot 100 (Billboard)	1
Canada AC (Billboard)	46
Canada CHR/Top 40 (Billboard)	1
Canada Hot AC (Billboard)	16
CIS Airplay (TopHit) Imanbek Remix	2
Colombia (National-Report) Latino Gang remix	43
Czech Republic Airplay (ČNS IFPI)	2
Czech Republic Singles Digital (ČNS IFPI)	1
Denmark (Tracklisten) Imanbek Remix	3
Finland (Suomen virallinen lista)	4
France (SNEP) Imanbek Remix	2
Germany (GfK) Imanbek Remix	3
Global 200 (Billboard)	14
Greece (IFPI)	1
Hungary (Dance Top 40) Imanbek Remix	23
Hungary (Rádiós Top 40) Imanbek Remix	7
Hungary (Single Top 40) Imanbek Remix	1
Hungary (Stream Top 40) Imanbek Remix	1
Iceland (Tónlistinn)	10
Ireland (IRMA)	1
Israel International Airplay (Media Forest) Imanbek Remix	3
Italy (FIMI) Imanbek Remix	4
Lithuania (AGATA)	2
Malaysia (RIM)	9
Mexico Airplay (Billboard)	3
Netherlands (Dutch Top 40)	1
Netherlands (Single Top 100) Imanbek Remix	1
New Zealand (Recorded Music NZ) Imanbek Remix	1
Norway (VG-lista) Imanbek Remix	4
Poland Airplay (ZPAV)	9
Portugal (AFP) Imanbek Remix	3
Romania (Airplay 100)	1
Russia Airplay (TopHit) Imanbek Remix	2
Scottish Singles Sales (Official Charts)	2
Singapore (RIAS)	9
Slovakia Airplay (ČNS IFPI)	1
Slovakia Singles Digital (ČNS IFPI)	1
Spain (PROMUSICAE)	23
Sweden (Sverigetopplistan) Imanbek Remix	4
Switzerland (Schweizer Hitparade) Imanbek Remix	2
Ukraine Airplay (TopHit) Imanbek Remix	1
UK Singles (Official Charts)	1
US Billboard Hot 100	4
US Adult Pop Airplay (Billboard)	22
US Hot Dance/Electronic Songs (Billboard)	1
US Hot R&B/Hip-Hop Songs (Billboard)	36
US Pop Airplay (Billboard)	4
US Rhythmic Airplay (Billboard)	2
US Rolling Stone Top 100	3

2025 weekly chart performance for "Roses Imanbek Remix"
Chart (2025)	Peak position
Moldova Airplay (TopHit)	50

=== Monthly charts ===
Chart (2020–2025)	Peak position
Brazil (Pro-Música Brasil)	10
Moldova Airplay (TopHit)	98

=== Year-end charts ===
Chart (2020)	Position
Argentina Airplay (Monitor Latino)	95
Australia (ARIA)	2
Austria (Ö3 Austria Top 40)	2
Belgium (Ultratop Flanders)	5
Belgium (Ultratop Wallonia)	2
Canada (Canadian Hot 100)	6
Denmark (Tracklisten)	2
France (SNEP)	8
Germany (Official German Charts)	4
Hungary (Dance Top 40)	75
Hungary (Rádiós Top 40)	27
Hungary (Single Top 40)	2
Hungary (Stream Top 40)	2
Ireland (IRMA)	2
Italy (FIMI)	9
Netherlands (Dutch Top 40)	4
Netherlands (Single Top 100)	2
New Zealand (Recorded Music NZ)	3
Poland (Polish Airplay Top 100)	29
Romania (Airplay 100)	1
Russia Airplay (TopHit)	10
Spain (PROMUSICAE)	63
Sweden (Sverigetopplistan)	6
Switzerland (Schweizer Hitparade)	3
UK Singles (OCC)	3
US Billboard Hot 100	19
US Hot Dance/Electronic Songs (Billboard)	1
US Mainstream Top 40 (Billboard)	16
US Rhythmic (Billboard)	21
Worldwide (IFPI)	4

Chart (2021)	Position
Australia (ARIA)	56
Austria (Ö3 Austria Top 40)	73
Brazil Streaming (Pro-Música Brasil)	181
CIS (Tophit)	41
France (SNEP)	82
Germany (Official German Charts)	60
Global 200 (Billboard)	35
Hungary (Dance Top 40)	87
Hungary (Rádiós Top 40)	81
Hungary (Stream Top 40)	55
Portugal (AFP)	98
Russia Airplay (Tophit)	53
Switzerland (Schweizer Hitparade)	63
UK Singles (OCC)	98
US Hot Dance/Electronic Songs (Billboard)	2

Chart (2025)	Position
Hungary (Rádiós Top 40)	78

== Certifications ==
Region	Certification	Certified units/sales
Australia (ARIA)	7× Platinum	490,000^{‡}
Austria (IFPI Austria)	3× Platinum	90,000^{‡}
Belgium (BRMA)	3× Platinum	120,000^{‡}
Canada (Music Canada)	8× Platinum	640,000^{‡}
Denmark (IFPI Danmark)	3× Platinum	270,000^{‡}
France (SNEP)	Diamond	333,333^{‡}
Germany (BVMI)	Diamond	1,000,000^{‡}
Italy (FIMI)	4× Platinum	280,000^{‡}
Mexico (AMPROFON)	Diamond	300,000^{‡}
New Zealand (RMNZ)	3× Platinum	90,000^{‡}
Norway (IFPI Norway)	2× Platinum	120,000^{‡}
Poland (ZPAV)	Diamond	250,000^{‡}
Portugal (AFP)	3× Platinum	30,000^{‡}
Spain (Promusicae)	2× Platinum	80,000^{‡}
Switzerland (IFPI Switzerland)	2× Platinum	40,000^{‡}
United Kingdom (BPI)	3× Platinum	1,800,000^{‡}
United States (RIAA)	5× Platinum	5,000,000^{‡}
United States (RIAA) Future Remix	Platinum	1,000,000^{‡}
Streaming
Greece (IFPI Greece)	2× Platinum	4,000,000^{†}
Sweden (GLF)	3× Platinum	24,000,000^{†}
^{‡} Sales+streaming figures based on certification alone.^{†} Streaming-only figures based on certification alone.

== See also ==
- List of Airplay 100 number ones of the 2020s
