= BET Her Award =

American entertainment award category

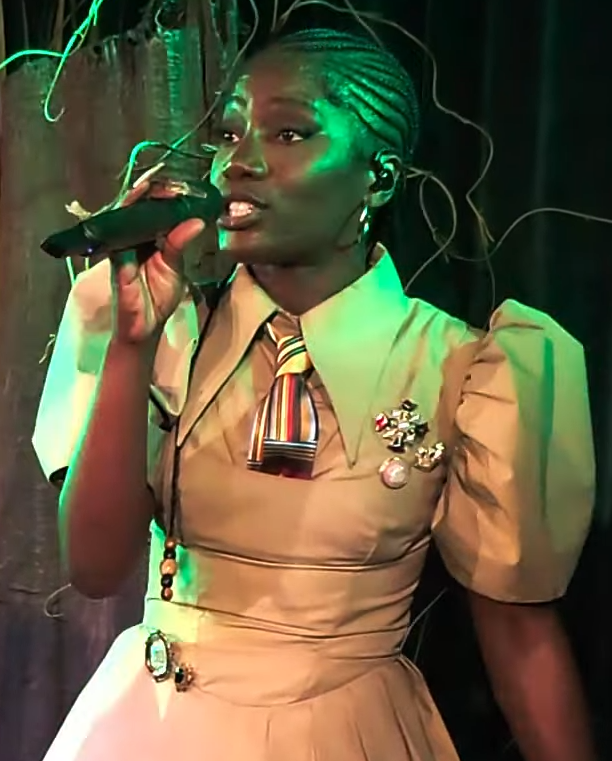
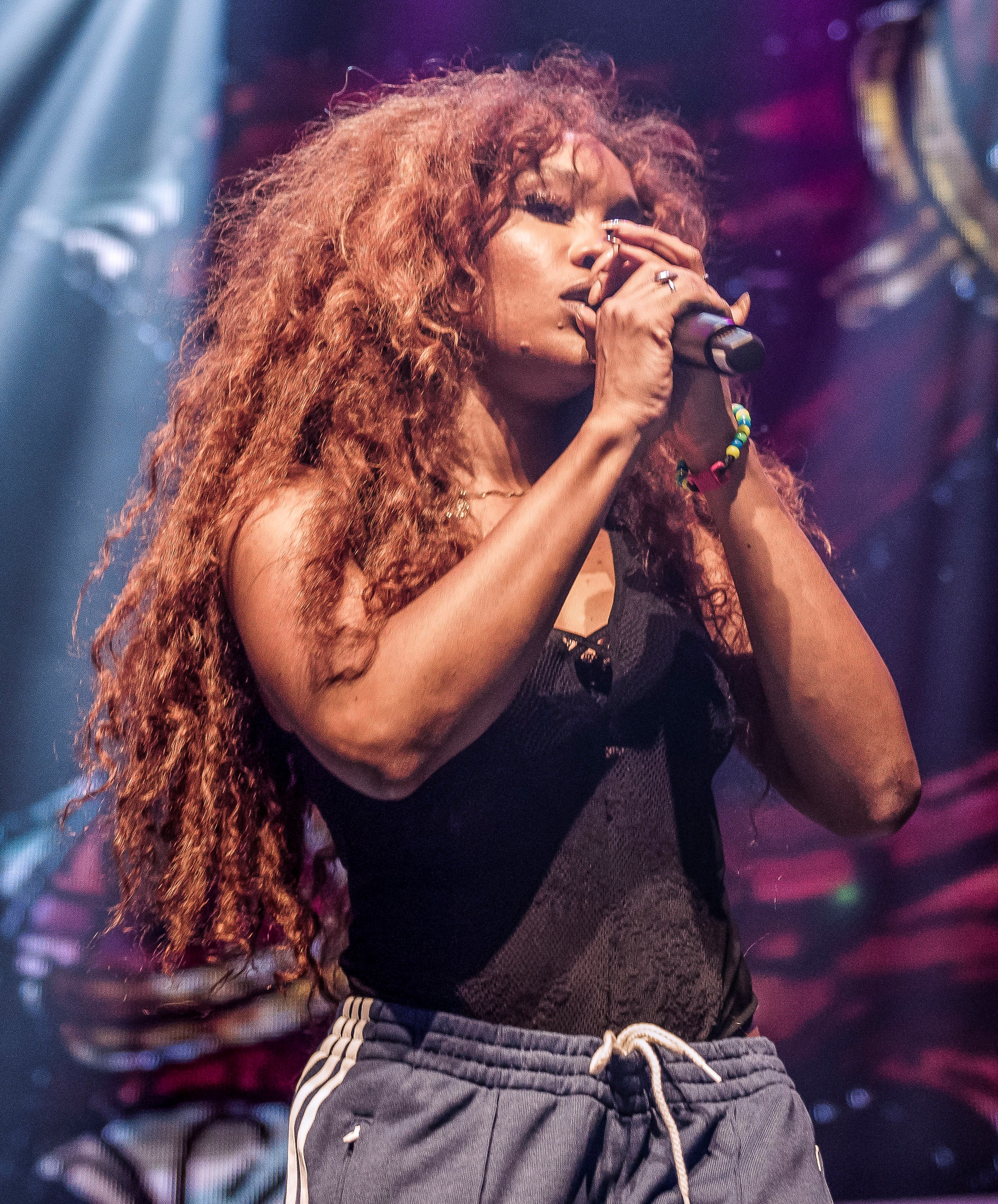
- "Girl, Get Up" by Doechii and SZA is the most recent recipient
- Country: United States
- Presented by: BET Awards
- First award: 2006
- Currently held by: Doechii and SZA (2026)

Highlights
- Most wins: Beyoncé (3)
- Most nominations: Mary J. Blige (5)
- Website: bet.com/bet-awards

The BET Her Award honors motivational and empowering songs that center women. The award was first awarded in 2006 as the BET J Cool Like That Award to honor outstanding neo soul and traditional R&B artists. The name of the award was changed when the BET J channel was rebranded as Centric in 2009, and again in 2018 when Centric was rebranded as BET Her. Until 2012, artists themselves were nominated, but in 2013, BET began nominating artists with a respective song. Beyoncé is the most awarded artist in this category with three wins.

== Winners and nominees ==
Winners are listed first and highlighted in bold.

- BET J Cool Like That Award (2006–2007)
- BET J Award (2008–2009)
- BET Centric Award (2010–2017)
- BET Her Award (2018–present)

=== 2000s ===
Year	Artist	Ref
2006
2006	**Anthony Hamilton**	
2006	Corrine Bailey Rae	
2006	Eric Benét	
2006	Heather Headley	
2006	Kindred the Family Soul	
2007
2007	**Gerald Levert**	
2007	Brian McKnight	
2007	Musiq	
2007	Eric Roberson	
2007	Elisabeth Withers	
2008
2008	**Raheem DeVaughn**	
2008	Chaka Khan	
2008	Ledisi	
2008	Jill Scott	
2008	Angie Stone	
2009
2009	**Jazmine Sullivan**	
2009	Musiq	
2009	Raphael Saadiq	
2009	Seal	
2009	Solange	

=== 2010s ===
Year	Artist	Song	Ref
2010
2010	**Monica**		
2010	Melanie Fiona		
2010	Maxwell		
2010	Chrisette Michele		
2010	Sade		
2011
2011	**Marsha Ambrosius**		
2011	Eric Benét		
2011	CeeLo Green		
2011	Kem		
2011	R. Kelly		
2012
2012	**Common**		
2012	Estelle		
2012	Robert Glasper		
2012	Robin Thicke		
2012	Tyrese		
2013
2013	**Tamar Braxton**	**"Love and War"**	
2013	Fantasia	"Lose to Win"	
2013	Miguel	"Adorn"	
2013	Nas	"Daughters"	
2013	Charlie Wilson	"My Love is All I Have"	
2014
2014	**Jhené Aiko**	**"The Worst"**	
2014	Aloe Blacc	"The Man"	
2014	Jennifer Hudson (feat. T.I.)	"I Can't Describe (The Way I Feel)"	
2014	Wale (feat. Sam Dew)	"LoveHate Thing"	
2014	Liv Warfield	"Why Do You Lie?"	
2015
2015	**The Weeknd**	**"Earned It"**	
2015	AverySunshine	"Call My Name"	
2015	Mark Ronson (feat. Bruno Mars)	"Uptown Funk"	
2015	Sam Smith and Mary J. Blige	"Stay with Me"	
2015	Jazmine Sullivan (feat. Meek Mill)	"Dumb"	
2016
2016	**Beyoncé**	**"Formation"**	
2016	Andra Day	"Rise Up"	
2016	The Internet	"Under Control"	
2016	K. Michelle	"Not a Little Bit"	
2016	Rihanna	"Bitch Better Have My Money"	
2017
2017	**Solange**	**"Cranes in the Sky"**	
2017	Mary J. Blige	"Thick of It"	
2017	Fantasia	"Sleeping with the One I Love"	
2017	Kehlani	"Distraction"	
2017	Syd	"All About Me"	
2017	Yuna (feat. Usher)	"Crush"	
2018
2018	**Mary J. Blige**	**"Strength of a Woman"**	
2018	Janelle Monáe	"Django Jane"	
2018	Remy Ma (feat. Chris Brown)	"Melanin Magic (Pretty Brown)"	
2018	Leikeli47	"2nd Fiddle"	
2018	Lizzo	"Water Me"	
2018	Chloe x Halle	"The Kids Are Alright"	
2019
2019	**H.E.R.**	**"Hard Place"**	
2019	Alicia Keys	"Raise a Man"	
2019	Ciara	"Level Up"	
2019	Janelle Monáe	"Pynk"	
2019	Queen Naija	"Mama's Hand"	
2019	Teyana Taylor	"Rose in Harlem"	

=== 2020s ===
Year	Artist	Song	Ref
2020
2020	**Beyoncé (feat. Blue Ivy, Wizkid, and Saint Jhn)**	**"Brown Skin Girl"**	
2020	Alicia Keys	"Underdog"	
2020	Ciara (feat. Lupita Nyong'o, Ester Dean, City Girls and La La)	"Melanin"	
2020	Layton Greene	"I Choose"	
2020	Lizzo (feat. Missy Elliott)	"Tempo"	
2020	Rapsody (feat. PJ Morton)	"Afeni"	
2021
2021	**SZA**	**"Good Days"**	
2021	Alicia Keys (feat. Khalid)	"So Done"	
2021	Brandy (feat. Chance the Rapper)	"Baby Mama"	
2021	Bri Steves	"Anti Queen"	
2021	Chloe x Halle	"Baby Girl"	
2021	Ciara (feat. Ester Dean)	"Rooted"	
2022
2022	**Mary J. Blige**	**"Good Morning Gorgeous"**	
2022	Alicia Keys	"Best of Me (Originals)"	
2022	Chlöe	"Have Mercy"	
2022	Ari Lennox	"Pressure"	
2022	Jazmine Sullivan	"Roster"	
2022	Summer Walker (feat. Ari Lennox)	"Unloyal"	
2022	Doja Cat	"Woman"	
2023
2023	**Beyoncé**	**"Break My Soul"**	
2023	Lizzo	"About Damn Time"	
2023	PinkPantheress and Ice Spice	"Boy's a Liar Pt. 2"	
2023	Megan Thee Stallion	"Her"	
2023	Rihanna and Ludwig Göransson	"Lift Me Up"	
2023	Coi Leray	"Players"	
2023	Lizzo	"Special"	
2024
2024	**Victoria Monét**	**"On My Mama"**	
2024	Beyoncé	"16 Carriages"	
2024	Nicki Minaj (feat. Tasha Cobbs Leonard)	"Blessings"	
2024	Ayra Starr	"Commas"	
2024	FLO (feat. Missy Elliott)	"Fly Girl"	
2024	Megan Thee Stallion	"Hiss"	
2024	SZA	"Saturn"	
2024	GloRilla	"Yeah Glo!"	
2025
2025	**Summer Walker**	**"Heart of a Woman"**	
2025	Mary J. Blige	"Beautiful People"	
2025	Beyoncé (feat. Tanner Adell, Brittney Spencer, Tiera Kennedy & Reyna Roberts)	"Blackbiird"	
2025	Doechii	"Bloom"	
2025	Tems	"Burning"	
2025	Cynthia Erivo (feat. Ariana Grande)	"Defying Gravity"	
2025	Tems	"Hold On"	
2025	FLO (feat. GloRilla)	"In My Bag"	
2026
2026	**Doechii (feat. SZA)**	**"Girl, Get Up"**	
2026	Tasha Cobbs Leonard	"Already Good (Tasha Slide)"	
2026	Jill Scott (feat. Trombone Shorty)	"Be Great"	
2026	Jill Scott	"Beautiful People"	
2026	Tems	"First"	
2026	Summer Walker, Latto & Doja Cat	"Go Girl"	
2026	Doja Cat	"Gorgeous"	
2026	Olivia Dean	"Lady Lady"	
