= Glory (Jay-Z song) =

2012 single by Jay-Z featuring Blue Ivy Carter

- 2026 reissue cover

Single by Jay-Z featuring Blue Ivy Carter
- Released: January 9, 2012
- Recorded: January 2012
- Genre: Hip-hop
- Length: 4:01
- Label: Roc Nation
- Lyricist: Shawn Carter
- Producer: The Neptunes

Jay-Z singles chronology
"I Do" (2012)	"Glory" (2012)	"Talk That Talk" (2012)

Blue Ivy Carter singles chronology
"Glory" (2012)	"Brown Skin Girl" (2019)

"Glory" is a song by American rapper Jay-Z featuring his daughter Blue Ivy Carter. Produced by the Neptunes (Pharrell Williams & Chad Hugo), it premiered on Jay-Z's official website LifeandTimes.com on January 9, 2012, two days after his wife Beyoncé gave birth to the couple's first child Blue. "Glory" debuted on US urban contemporary radio stations on January 17, 2012. The hip-hop song serves as an emotional homage to Jay-Z's then-newborn child and wife. Lyrically, "Glory" is about the experience and happiness of becoming a father for the first time, while also detailing the heartbreak the couple suffered over a previous miscarriage. The song opens with Blue's first heartbeat, and includes a sample of Blue's cries towards the end.

"Glory" received positive reviews from professional music critics, complimenting the lyrics' emotional depth, samples of Blue, and production from the Neptunes. Commercially, the song made its appearance on the US Hot R&B/Hip-Hop Songs and Hot Rap Songs charts, making Blue the youngest person to be credited on a charting song in any Billboard chart. Following its release, Jay-Z performed "Glory" at a Carnegie Hall charity performance in New York in February 2012, followed with a performance at the SXSW Festival in Austin the following month. A music video containing footage from the former concert's rehearsal was exclusively released to Tidal in 2015. In July 2026, "Glory" was released to all streaming platforms.

== Background and releases ==
On January 7, 2012, Beyoncé gave birth to her and Jay-Z's first child, Blue Ivy Carter, at Lenox Hill Hospital in New York. Two days later, Jay-Z released "Glory" on his social website LifeandTimes.com. Produced by the Neptunes, the song was composed in honor to Blue Ivy Carter, who is credited on it. It was later released to US urban contemporary radio playlists on January 17. On July 11, 2026, Jay-Z released "Glory" to all streaming platforms, following his performance at the Yankee Stadium the previous night.

== Composition and lyrics ==
"Glory" is an emotional hip-hop song dedicated to Blue Ivy Carter and Knowles, as Jay-Z sings "You're my child with the child from Destiny's Child." Opening with Blue's heartbeat, Jay-Z experiencing the overwhelming joy of fatherhood for the first time. Describing Blue as "the most beautiful thing in this world", he promises to keep her happy — in contrast to his own troubled childhood, which was affected by the departure of his dad, Adnes Reeves. Jocelyn Vena of MTV News commented that the concept of the song revolves around the glory of fatherhood.

As the song progresses, Jay-Z reveals that Blue was conceived in Paris, a day before Knowles shot the cover artwork for her fourth studio album 4 (2011). It also details Jay-Z's and Knowles' pregnancy struggles, including a miscarriage the latter experienced previously, In reference to Aaliyah's death in a plane crash in 2001, Jay Z also urges Blue to exercise safety, with the lyric, "Just make sure the plane you're on is bigger than your carry-on baggage". At the end of "Glory", Blue Ivy Carter can be heard crying.

== Critical reception ==
Touré of Time magazine called "Glory" one of the "greatest love songs in hip-hop history". Chris Randle of The Village Voice wrote that the song "sounds humbled and relieved, and soft enough to bear some marks; at certain points, Jay's voice almost seems to quaver." He added that Jay-Z "goes from revealing a past miscarriage to sharing the precise date of conception, as if still ambling through the ward in elated exhaustion." Maura Johnston of the same publication noted that "Glory" was "happy and humbled just like all those shots of new dads in movies; you can almost smell the cigars being lit as Jay tosses off his first (but probably not last) dedication to his daughter, which has as its best line 'You're the child of a child from Destiny's Child.'" SF Weekly's Shona Sanzgiri noted that the "rapper [is] celebrating with a strange mixture of certainty and guilelessness" in the song. She added that "Glory" is a "condensed saga, where the revelations range from somewhat brazen... to somber".

David K. Li, Josh Saul, and Tata Palmeri of the New York Post wrote that "the emotional song may win over even Jay-Z's harshest critics". Rob Markman of MTV News praised "Glory" saying that Jay-Z recorded his "most personal thoughts... and then tops things off by adding the crying and cooing bundle of joy to the track, effectively giving baby girl her very first feature". David Marchese of Spin magazine felt that "Jay spouts all sorts of fatherly sentiment on the track". Jody Rosen of Rolling Stone awarded the song with three-and-a-half out of five stars, praising its "lilting Neptunes beat". He further compared the song with "Isn't She Lovely?" (1976) by Stevie Wonder, saying that it mixes "exultant proud-papa sentiments with brand-consolidation braggadocio: 'A pinch of Hov, a whole glass of B.' But the mood is reflective. 'Everybody go through stuff... Life is a gift, love, open it up.'"

== Commercial performance ==
"Glory" debuted at number 74 on the US Hot R&B/Hip-Hop Songs chart issue dated January 21, 2012, with 1.7 million audience impressions, according to Nielsen BDS. The song peaked at number 63 the following week before staying in the chart for two more weeks. It also debuted at number 23 on the US Rap Songs chart issue dated January 28, 2012. As Jay-Z's daughter, Blue, is officially credited on the song, she became the youngest person in history to have a charting song on any Billboard chart.

== Live performances and music video ==
On February 7, 2012, Jay-Z first performed "Glory" during his charity performance at Carnegie Hall in New York. The concert featured a 40-piece orchestra and the Illadelphonics, led by the Roots' Questlove on drums. Following the conclusion of the song, Jay-Z let the orchestra "ride its mellow beat" before thanking New York and the concert's attendees. He performed the song again during his appearance at the SXSW Festival in Austin on March 12.

=== Music video ===
The music video for "Glory" was released exclusively to Tidal on April 16, 2015, and features rehearsal footage of Jay-Z performing "Glory" before his Carnegie Hall performance. Featuring appearances from Alicia Keys, Nas, and Questlove, Jay-Z led his team through a group prayer right before the performance, concluding the music video.

== Personnel ==
Credits are adapted from Tidal.

- Shawn Carter – vocals, writing
- Blue Ivy Carter – featured artist
- The Neptunes – production

== Charts ==
Chart performance for "Glory"
Chart (2012)	Peak position
US Hot R&B/Hip-Hop Songs (Billboard)	63
US Hot Rap Songs (Billboard)	23

== Release history ==
Release history for "Glory"
Country	Date	Format	Label	Ref.
Global	January 9, 2012	LifeandTimes.com	Roc Nation	
United States	January 17, 2012	Urban radio	Roc Nation	
Global	July 11, 2026	Streaming and digital download	Roc Nation	
