= Brown Skin Girl =

2019 single by Beyoncé, Blue Ivy Carter, Saint Jhn and Wizkid

Single by Beyoncé, Blue Ivy Carter, Saint Jhn and Wizkid

from the album The Lion King: The Gift
- Released: July 23, 2019
- Recorded: 2019
- Studio: NRG Recording Studios (Los Angeles, California)
- Genre: R&B
- Length: 4:08
- Label: Parkwood; Columbia
- Songwriters: Beyoncé; Carlos St. John; Adio Marchant; Shawn Carter; P2J; Stacy Barthe; Anathi Mnyango; Michael Uzowuru
- Producers: P2J; Beyoncé

Beyoncé singles chronology
"Spirit" (2019)	"Brown Skin Girl" (2019)	"Savage (Remix)" (2020)

Saint Jhn singles chronology
"Trap" (2019)	"Brown Skin Girl" (2019)	"All I Want Is a Yacht" (2019)

Wizkid singles chronology
"Joro" (2019)	"Brown Skin Girl" (2019)	"Ghetto Love" (2019)

Blue Ivy Carter singles chronology
"Glory" (2012)	"Brown Skin Girl" (2019)

Music video
- "Brown Skin Girl" on YouTube

"Brown Skin Girl" (stylized in uppercase) is a song by American singer Beyoncé, her daughter Blue Ivy Carter, Guyanese-American rapper Saint Jhn, and Nigerian singer Wizkid. Produced by P2J and Beyoncé, it is taken from the 2019 soundtrack album The Lion King: The Gift. The song was sent to Top 40/Rhythmic radio on July 23, 2019, as the second single from the album.

The song was released to widespread critical acclaim and received numerous awards, including the Soul Train Music Award for The Ashford & Simpsons Songwriter's Award and the BET HER Award.

The music video for "Brown Skin Girl" was featured in Beyoncé's 2020 film Black Is King and was released separately on August 24, 2020. Directed by Beyoncé and Jenn Nkiru, the video acts a celebration and affirmation of the beauty of dark-skinned women. The video, featuring Beyoncé, Blue Ivy and Wizkid won the award for Best Music Video at the 63rd Annual Grammy Awards, as well as the Soul Train Music Award for Video of the Year and the MTV Video Music Award for Best Cinematography.

== Background ==
The song marks the second collaboration between Beyoncé and her daughter Blue Ivy Carter, following "Blue", a song from Beyoncé's self-titled 2013 album. The song caused the #BrownSkinGirlChallenge to go viral upon release.

== Composition and lyrics ==
The song contains "spare, syncopated African rhythms", while its lyrics deal with colorism faced by darker-complexioned women: "Brown skin girl / ya skin just like pearls / Your back against the world". Billboard magazine called the lyrics "compelling", noting how the song shout-outs pioneering brown girls such as Naomi Campbell, Lupita Nyong'o, and Beyoncé's former Destiny's Child bandmate Kelly Rowland.

== Critical reception ==
In a positive review, Imani Bashir of Teen Vogue described the song as a "celebration of dark-skinned women". Amanda Mitchell at O, The Oprah Magazine complimented the song for being "unapologetically and fearlessly Black". Time magazine praised Blue Ivy Carter's appearance, calling it a "gracious cameo". Ellise Shafer of Billboard noted that she added a "sentimental tone to the track". Alexis Petridis writing for The Guardian pinpointed "Brown Skin Girl" as one of the album highlights, describing it as "brilliant".

Lupita Nyong'o also reacted by posting a video of herself on Friday, July 19, 2019, via Instagram, singing and dancing along to "Brown Skin Girl", in which her name was specifically applauded by Beyoncé.

At the 2019 Soul Train Music Awards, "Brown Skin Girl" won the Ashford & Simpson Songwriter's Award and was also nominated for Best Collaboration.

== Cover versions ==
In September 2019, Stormzy covered "Brown Skin Girl" for BBC Radio 1's Live Lounge. The song was also covered by Kanye West and Sunday Service Choir in December 2019. In April 2020, Leslie Odom Jr. and Nicolette Robinson performed a cover of "Brown Skin Girl" for Global Citizen One World: Together At Home. The performance was nominated for a LiveXLive Lockdown Award for Digital Chemistry: Favorite Duet.

== Music video ==
=== Release and synopsis ===
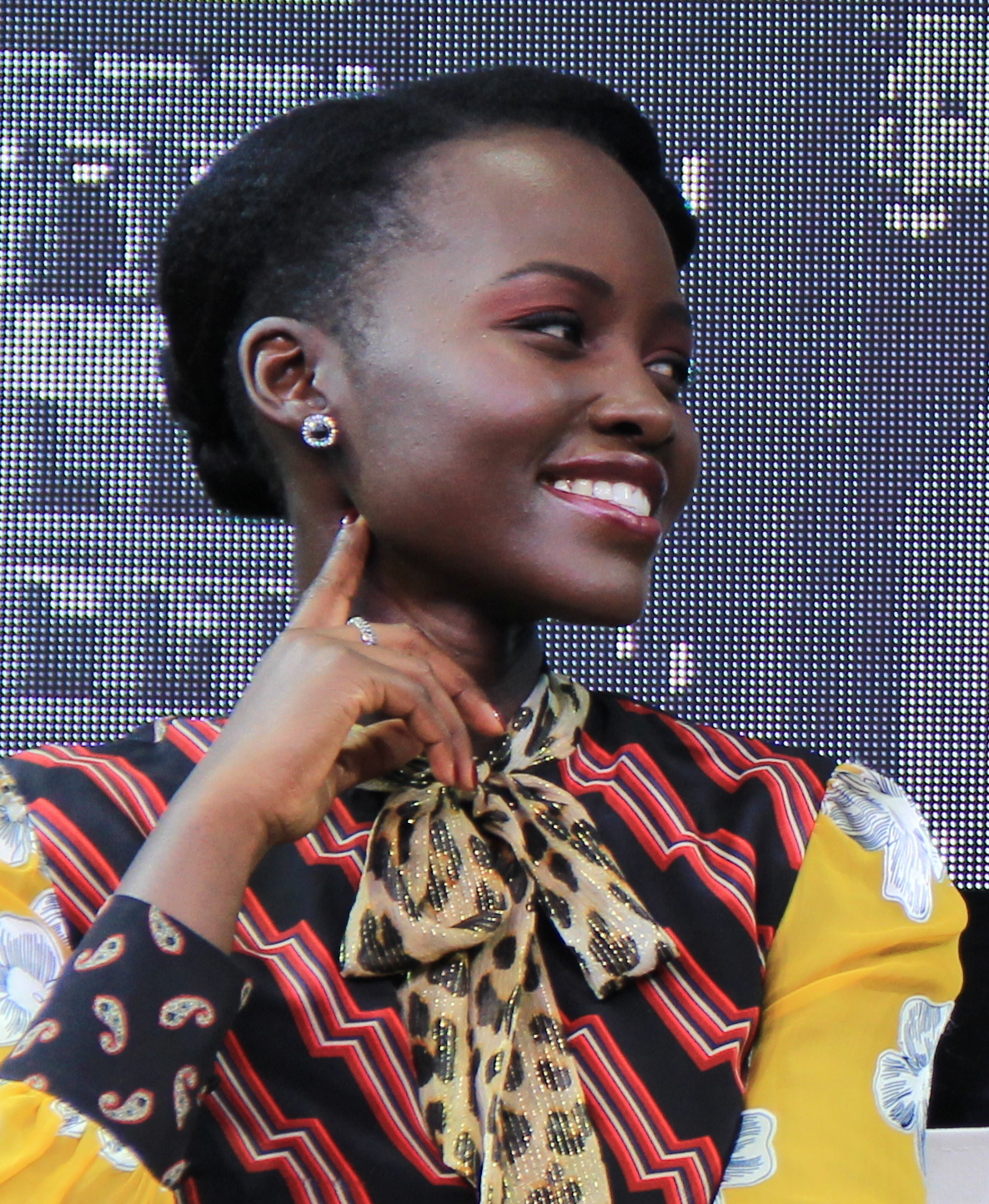
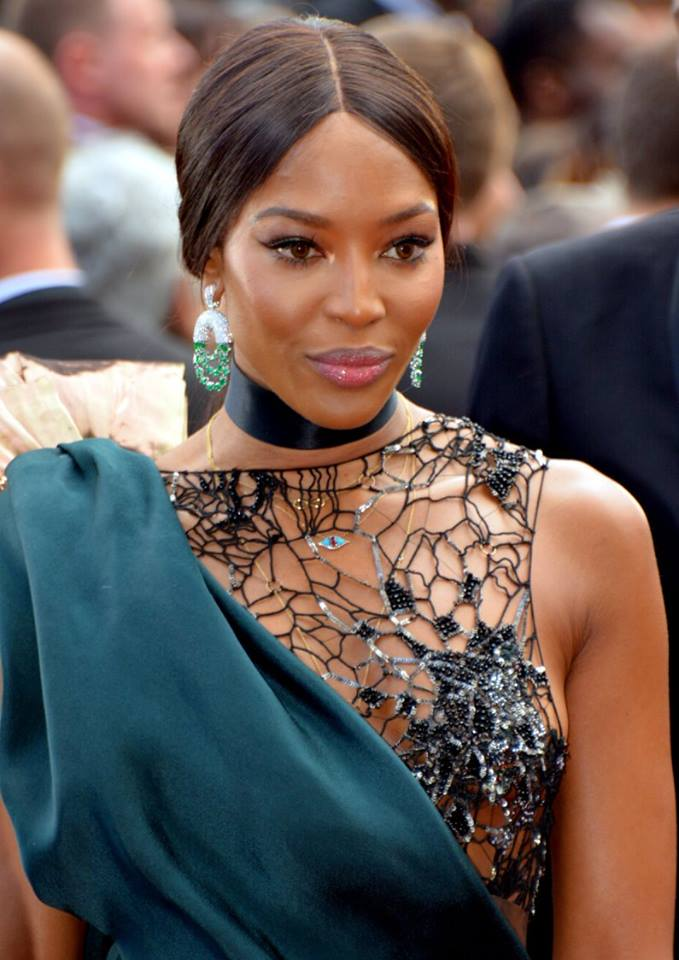
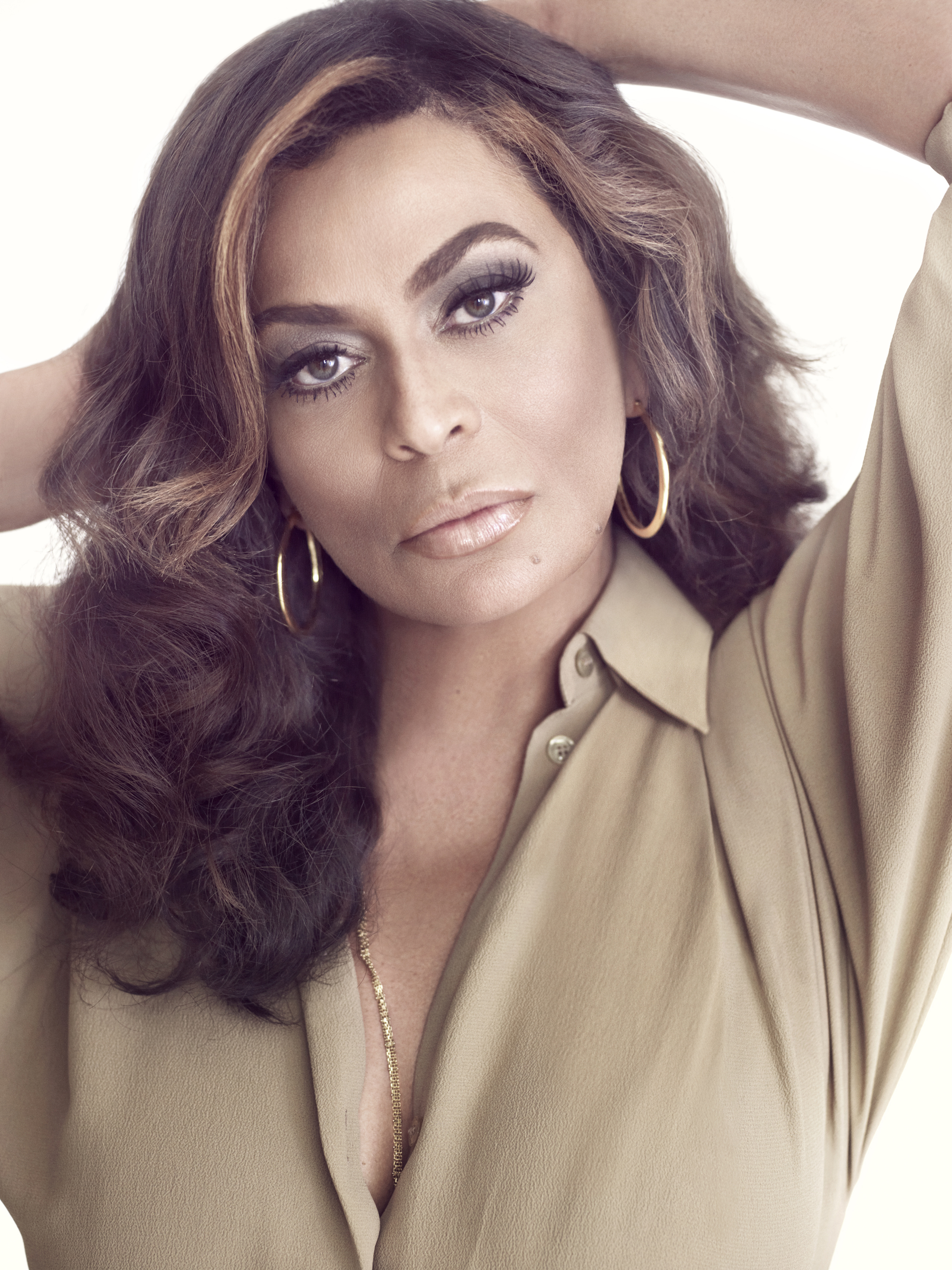
The video features cameos by Lupita Nyong'o, Naomi Campbell, Kelly Rowland and Tina Knowles-Lawson.

A music video for the song, directed by Beyoncé and Jenn Nkiru, was included in Black Is King, a visual album and film based on the music of The Lion King: The Gift which premiered on Disney+ on July 31, 2020. On August 24, 2020, a standalone version of the music video was premiered on Good Morning America and subsequently released through Beyoncé's YouTube channel. It became the second music video from the film available to officially watch outside of Disney+, following "Already" which premiered on YouTube and was uploaded to Instagram a few hours prior to Black Is King's release.

The video acts as a celebration and affirmation of the beauty of dark skin. It depicts a black debutante ball (a tradition in African-American communities in the Southern United States) and showcases a variety of black and brown girls and women, including Mexican-Kenyan actress Lupita Nyong'o, British model Naomi Campbell, American singer Kelly Rowland, South Sudanese-Australian model Adut Akech, Sudanese model Aweng Ade-Chuol, Beyoncé's mother Tina Knowles-Lawson, and Beyoncé's daughters Blue Ivy and Rumi Carter.

=== Development ===
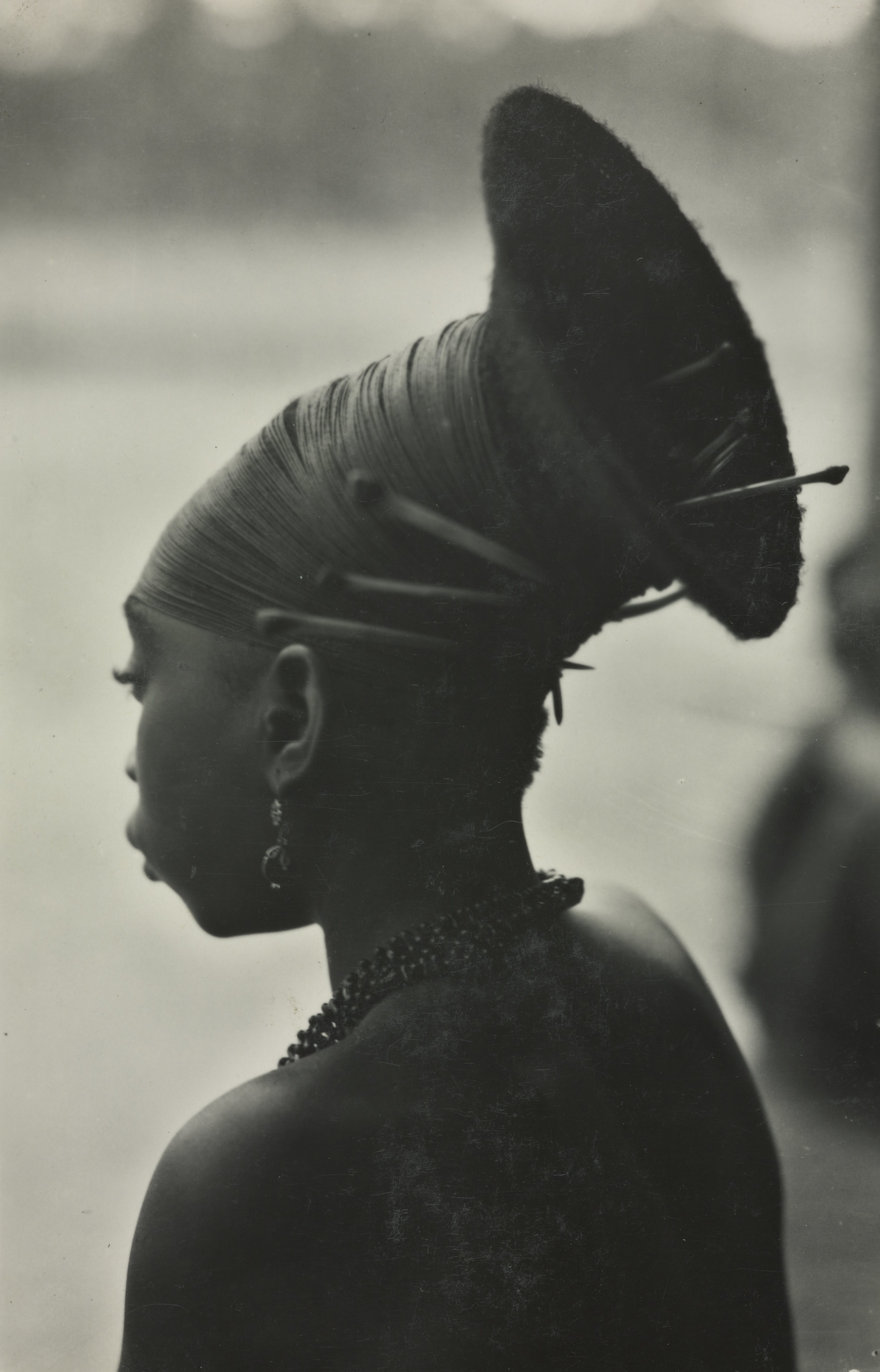
The Mangbetu people's skull elongation inspired a hairstyle in the video.

Beyoncé explained the development of the music video, telling Good Morning America, "It was so important to me in 'Brown Skin Girl' that we represented all different shades of brown .... We wanted every character to be shot in a regal light — Jenn Nkiru came up with the black debutantes. It was important that we are all in this together and we're all celebrating each other." The music video was primarily filmed in South London, as it was intended for Black Is King to feature locations from throughout the African diaspora. Nkiru told British Vogue that the video aims to showcase images that are not typically seen on screen, such as a black debutante ball which is a rite of passage in African-American culture, and display "intimacy, sisterhood, [and] celebrations" between black women.

In an interview for Essence, Nkiru explained how as well as featuring the "incredible star-studded cast", she also cast "women who are lesser known but are on the ground really doing work" and "who are the activists in their field". Nkiru also wanted to expand the conversation by highlighting non-black women who face colorism in their communities, and consequently included an indigenous Brazilian woman and women of southeast Asian heritage in the music video. Nkiru picked South Asian model Sheerah Ravindren to be featured in the video, who said that it was "such a blessing to be in this beautiful art piece that shows the beauty and power of Blackness" and adding that Beyoncé has "already done so much MORE for representation and empowerment for South Asians than the South Asian film industries." Nkiru also asked Selma Nicholls, founder of casting agency Looks Like Me, to cast children for the video. Nicholls called it "a dream come true, not just for me, not just for those children that were selected, but for all black children". Nicholls' own daughter was chosen for the film; Nicholls explained that "it's made my daughter be part of something where five years from when she wanted to look like Elsa and Anna, is singing along to the song "Brown Skin Girl".

Beyoncé's hairstyles in the film were inspired by traditional African styles, according to hairstylist Neal Farinah. This included a braid crown inspired by the Mangbetu people of the Eastern Congo, whose Lipombo skull elongation technique represented royalty and status, and a style known as Orisha Bunmi, which is a Nigerian hairstyle worn for special events.

=== Critical reception ===
Zoe Haylock for Vulture declared the "Brown Skin Girl" video "a revolution in six minutes", praising the "African influences, intricate, opulent styling, and pure Black-girl joy". Haylock added that the video should be placed in the Louvre and would rival the Mona Lisa. Jem Aswad of Variety similarly described the video as "almost more like a series of paintings" and praised the series of "beautiful" costumes. IndieWire named the "Brown Skin Girl" video the sixth best music video of 2020. Leonardo Adrian Garcia wrote that Variety's review "implies a passivity to the proceedings", however the beauty of the video is not "just about locations and wardrobe", but also "the kinetic motion of the camera in relation to its subjects, subtly panning up, zooming out, or spinning overhead. It really is a marvel." Callie Ahlgrim of Insider named "Brown Skin Girl" the second best music video of 2020, after Beyoncé's own "Already" which was also featured in Black Is King. Ahlgrim stated that there are "many details ... to fawn over" in the video and praised the numerous cameos, especially the moments with Kelly Rowland, which she described as "intimate and intensely heartwarming". Complex ranked the video as the 10th best one of 2020. Describing the video as "stunning" and "celebratory", Glenn Rowley of Billboard wrote that it "laud[s] and pass[es] down the ideals of Black identity, heritage and beauty to future generations of brown skinned girls." Mekishana Pierre for PopSugar described how the video moved her to tears, noting that the "lush visuals punctuate the song's devotion to melanin-rich beauty". Sukriti Wahi of Elle Australia praised how the video includes non-black people of color who have experienced colorism, such as Sri Lankan Tamilian model Sheerah Ravindren.

=== Impact ===
The release of Black Is King kicked off hair and makeup trends, with stylists and artists around the world creating looks particularly inspired by those seen in the "Brown Skin Girl" video. For an exhibition in the African American Museum titled "Hair Story", artist Youveline Joseph produced artworks inspired by "Brown Skin Girl" that recreated some of the braided hairstyles from the video.

== Awards and nominations ==
At the BET Awards 2020, "Brown Skin Girl" won the BET HER Award, making Blue Ivy the youngest BET Award winner of all time. The "Brown Skin Girl" music video won Best Music Video at the 63rd Annual Grammy Awards. For this award, Blue Ivy received the Guinness World Record for the youngest individually credited winner at the Grammy Awards.

Year	Ceremony	Award	Result	Ref(s).
2019	The Daily Californian Arts Awards	Best Song	Won	
2019	Soul Train Music Awards	The Ashford & Simpsons Songwriter's Award	Won	
2019	Soul Train Music Awards	Best Collaboration	Nominated	
2019	All Africa Music Awards	Best Collaboration	Nominated	
2020	BET Awards	BET HER Award	Won	
2020	NAACP Image Awards	Outstanding Duo, Group or Collaboration	Won	
2020	Soul Train Music Awards	Video of the Year	Won	
2021	AICP Post Awards	Color Grading: Music Video	Won	
2021	Cannes Lions Awards	Excellence in Music Video	Gold	
2021	Grammy Awards	Best Music Video	Won	
2021	NAACP Image Awards	Outstanding Music Video/Visual Album	Won	
2021	MTV Video Music Awards	Best Cinematography	Won	
2021	MTV Video Music Awards	Best R&B	Nominated	
2021	UK Music Video Awards	Best R&B/Soul Video – International	Nominated	
2021	UK Music Video Awards	Best Wardrobe Styling in a Video	Nominated	

== Charts ==
=== Weekly charts ===
Weekly chart performance for "Brown Skin Girl"
Chart (2019)	Peak position
Canada Hot 100 (Billboard)	60
Ireland (IRMA)	47
Lithuania (AGATA)	29
Netherlands (Single Top 100)	82
New Zealand Hot Singles (RMNZ)	4
Sweden Heatseeker (Sverigetopplistan)	6
UK Singles (Official Charts)	42
US Billboard Hot 100	76
US Hot R&B/Hip-Hop Songs (Billboard)	27
US Rolling Stone Top 100	1
US World Digital Song Sales (Billboard)	1

=== Year-end charts ===
Year-end chart performance for "Brown Skin Girl"
Chart (2019)	Position
South Africa (IFPI)	7

== Certifications ==
Region	Certification	Certified units/sales
Australia (ARIA)	Gold	35,000^{‡}
Canada (Music Canada)	Gold	40,000^{‡}
New Zealand (RMNZ)	Gold	15,000^{‡}
United Kingdom (BPI)	Silver	200,000^{‡}
United States (RIAA)	Gold	500,000^{‡}
^{‡} Sales+streaming figures based on certification alone.

== Release history ==
Region	Date	Format	Label	Ref.
United States	July 23, 2019	Rhythmic contemporary	Parkwood; Columbia	
