= Good Times (Tommy Lee song) =

Single by Tommy Lee

from the album Tommyland: The Ride
- Released: 2005
- Recorded: 2005
- Genre: Alternative rock
- Length: 3:10
- Songwriters: Tommy Lee; Scott Humphrey; Bradley G. Walker

Tommy Lee singles chronology
"Tryin to Be Me" (2005)	"Good Times" (2005)	"Hello, Again" (2005)

"Good Times" is a song released in 2005 by American musician Tommy Lee. It is the second single released from his second solo album Tommyland: The Ride. The song is also the theme song for the reality TV series Tommy Lee Goes to College.

The song is Lee's most successful as a solo artist.

"Good Times" reached number ninety-five on the Billboard Hot 100 and reached number twenty-five in Australia.

Lee performed the song live at the Comedy Central Roast of ex-wife Pamela Anderson.

== Charts ==
Chart (2005)	Peak position
Australia (ARIA)	25
Germany (GfK)	82
Netherlands (Single Top 100)	93
UK Rock Chart	8
US Billboard Hot 100	95
