= Tommy Lee (song) =

2020 single by Tyla Yaweh featuring Post Malone

Single by Tyla Yaweh featuring Post Malone
- Released: June 12, 2020
- Genre: Trap
- Length: 3:44
- Label: Epic; London
- Songwriters: Tyler Brown; Austin Post; Trevon Campbell; Jacob Deimler; Jared Scharff
- Producers: XL; RVNES; Pearl Lion

Tyla Yaweh singles chronology
"High Right Now (Remix)" (2020)	"Tommy Lee" (2020)	"Stuntin' on You" (2020)

Post Malone singles chronology
"It's a Raid" (2020)	"Tommy Lee" (2020)	"Tap In (Remix)" (2020)

Music video
- "Tommy Lee" on YouTube

"Tommy Lee" is a song by American rapper Tyla Yaweh featuring American musician Post Malone, released on June 12, 2020. It was originally set to serve as the lead single from Yaweh's then-upcoming second studio album, Rager Boy, now titled Heart Full of Rage 2, but was scrapped from the tracklisting. Written alongside producers XL, RVNES, and Pearl Lion, it is Yaweh's first song to chart on the US Billboard Hot 100, peaking at number 65.

== Background and composition ==
Two days before its release, the song was teased by Tyla Yaweh on Instagram. It is an ode to his "lavish lifestyle" and is named after Mötley Crüe drummer Tommy Lee, who also plays the drums on the song's rock remix, "accented by strings and choice chimes that serve as a base for emotive verses from Tyla and Post". The two sing about living like rockstars without having to worry about anything, but also "touch on the tribulations of their position".

== Music video ==
The music video was released on June 12, 2020. It shows Yaweh and Malone driving in ATVs and limousines in a pastoral setting.

== Remixes ==
An alternate version of the original track was released on July 10, 2020, with Tommy Lee himself playing on the drums. A second remix was released on August 28, 2020, featuring Guyanese-American rapper and singer Saint Jhn.

== Charts ==
Chart performance for "Tommy Lee"
Chart (2020)	Peak position
Australia (ARIA)	93
Canada Hot 100 (Billboard)	37
Ireland (IRMA)	49
New Zealand Hot Singles (RMNZ)	4
Portugal (AFP)	111
Sweden (Sverigetopplistan)	92
UK Singles (OCC)	56
US Billboard Hot 100	65
US Hot R&B/Hip-Hop Songs (Billboard)	30
US Rhythmic Airplay (Billboard)	24
US Rolling Stone Top 100	44

== Certifications ==
Certifications for "Tommy Lee"
Region	Certification	Certified units/sales
Canada (Music Canada)	Platinum	80,000^{‡}
New Zealand (RMNZ)	Gold	15,000^{‡}
United States (RIAA)	Platinum	1,000,000^{‡}
^{‡} Sales+streaming figures based on certification alone.
