= Never a Dull Moment (Tommy Lee album) =

Studio album by Tommy Lee
- Released: May 21, 2002
- Recorded: 2001–2002
- Genre: Nu metal; alternative metal; rap metal; alternative rock
- Length: 40:35
- Label: MCA
- Producer: Scott Humphrey, Tommy Lee

Tommy Lee chronology
Never a Dull Moment (2002)	Tommyland: The Ride (2005)

Singles from Never a Dull Moment
- 1. "Hold Me Down" Released: 2002; 2. "Sunday" Released: 2002; 3. "Ashamed" Released: 2003; 4. "Higher" Released: 2003

Professional ratings
Review scores
Source	Rating
Allmusic	3/5 stars

Never a Dull Moment is the first solo album by American rock musician Tommy Lee, released on May 21, 2002 by MCA.

== Background ==
Tommy Lee began writing music in September 2000, following Methods of Mayhem's stint on Ozzfest. Lee described the process in a 2002 interview:

"I locked myself in my home and I just started writing. I didn't know what I wanted to do; it was more like [I thought] 'let's just write and see where this goes and make this like a natural progression.' What you hear is where it went. The more we started listening to it [in the studio] the more my producer started going, 'Dude, you know, you can just call this what it is.' I was like, 'What are you talking about?' And he goes, 'Why don't you just call this Tommy Lee?' After thinking about it for a while, I realized he was right. That's when I made that decision, to just go under my own name rather than a 'band' name."

Never a Dull Moment features the hit single "Hold Me Down". Its music video debuted in late April and found significant airplay on MTV2. Directed by Dean Karr, it revolves around Lee riding a strange flying machine which crashes. Cirque du Soleil-like performers are also featured in the video. "Hold Me Down" was performed on The Tonight Show with Jay Leno on May 22, 2002. The track, as well as the singles "Sunday" and "Ashamed" aired on Muzak's Power Rock station as well. "Ashamed" also featured a Music video.

Aside from basic alternative metal, Never a Dull Moment encompasses a variety of styles. Ballads are offered through "Ashamed" and "Blue", which features guest vocals by Brandon Boyd, and "Sunday" boasts Neue Deutsche Härte aesthetics. A cover of David Bowie's "Fame" is also featured on the album. In promotion of the album, Tommy Lee embarked on a tour beginning on May 24, 2002 and ending on July 20. This features bands such as Abandoned Pools and Headstrong. He also appeared on the Rock Fest 2003 tour alongside Nickelback and Default.

== Track listing ==
All tracks are written by Tommy Lee except for those that were noted.

No.	Title	Writer(s)	Length
1.	"Afterglow"		3:33
2.	"Hold Me Down"	Kai Huppunen	3:23
3.	"Body Architects"		2:57
4.	"Ashamed" (featuring Chino Moreno)	Huppunen, Chino Moreno	3:51
5.	"Fame 02" (David Bowie cover)	David Bowie, John Lennon, Carlos Alomar	3:39
6.	"Blue" (featuring Brandon Boyd)	Brandon Boyd, Mike Einziger	4:30
7.	"Sunday"	Huppunen	3:28
8.	"Why Is It"	Scott Humphrey	4:02
9.	"Face to Face"	Huppunen	2:57
10.	"Higher"	Marty O'Brien	4:00
11.	"People So Strange"		3:15
12.	"Mr. Shitty"		1:02
Total length:			40:35

== Charts ==
Album

Year	Chart	Position
2002	Billboard 200	39

Album (Year-end)

Chart (2002)	Position
Canadian Alternative Albums (Nielsen SoundScan)	199

Singles

Year	Single	Chart	Position
2002	"Hold Me Down"	Mainstream Rock Tracks	5
