= Heart Full of Rage =

Studio album by Tyla Yaweh
- Released: February 22, 2019
- Genre: Hip hop
- Length: 28:43
- Label: Epic; London
- Producer: Dre London (exec.); Tes Siyoum (exec.); Hector Soundz; Chad Hugo; DNNYD; Fernando Garibay; Kid Hazel; Kilo Keys; Miro; Nicki Adamsson; Ramiro Padilla; Simon Says; Sorry Jaynari; Tank God; TROY NōKA; Yung Lan

Tyla Yaweh chronology
Heart Full of Rage (2019)	Heart Full of Rage 2 (2023)

Singles from Heart Full of Rage
- 1. "Gemini" Released: May 11, 2018; 2. "High Right Now" Released: January 31, 2020

Heart Full of Rage is the debut studio album by American rapper and singer Tyla Yaweh. It was released by Epic Records and London Entertainment on February 22, 2019. The album features guest appearances from French Montana and PnB Rock. It is supported by the singles "Gemini" and "High Right Now".

== Background ==
Yaweh had released several singles from 2017 until the release of Heart Full of Rage in 2019. None of his prior singles were on the album, except for "Gemini", which was released on May 11, 2018

== Touring ==
After the release of Heart Full of Rage, Yaweh toured in support of the album's songs, performing both albums tracks and his other songs. He was one of the support acts for Post Malone's Runaway Tour, on which he performed over half of the album's songs. He joined Malone, along with Swae Lee and DJ eNice, on both legs of the Runaway Tour.

== Track listing ==
No.	Title	Writer(s)	Producer(s)	Length
1.	"High Right Now"	Tyler Brown; Daniel Padilla; Ramiro Padilla; Fernando Garibay; Jason Wilkinson; Nastri Atweh	DNNYD; Miro; Garibay; Sorry Jaynari	2:43
2.	"Salute" (featuring French Montana)	Brown; Karim Kharbouch; Jermaine Denny; Jessie Lauren; Simon Rosen	Simon Says	3:02
3.	"Who Shot Johnny?"	Brown; A. Collins; Garibay; R. Padilla; Wilkinson; Brittany Barber; Rayvon Cawley	Garibay; TROY NōKA; Miro; Sorry Jaynari	2:45
4.	"Novacane"	Brown; Daystar Peterson; Olufunmibi Awoshiley; Nicki Adamsson	Tank God; Adamsson	3:31
5.	"Wraith Skating" (featuring PnB Rock)	Brown; Rakim Allen; D. Padilla; R. Padilla; Garibay; Barber	DNNYD; Miro; Garibay	2:34
6.	"Chiquita"	Brown; Garibay; R. Padilla; Wilkinson; Barber; Cawley; Dominique Davis	Garibay; Miro; Sorry Jaynari	2:35
7.	"Gemini"	Brown; Lauren; H. Garcia	Hector Soundz	3:06
8.	"Adderall"	Brown; Barber; Milan Modi; Brain Anamayatana	Yung Lan; Kilo Keyz	2:48
9.	"They Ain't You"	Brown; Lauren; Charles Hugo	Chad Hugo	2:47
10.	"Ain't What It Seems"	Brown; Lauren; Ahmar Bailey	Kid Hazel	2:52
Total length:				28:43

== Personnel ==
- Dre London – executive producer
- Tes Siyoum – executive producer
- Nick Mac – engineer, assistant engineer, recording engineer, mixing engineer
- Colin Leonard – mastering engineer
- Jason Wilkerson – mastering engineer
- Kevin Davis – mixing engineer
- Simon Says – recording engineer

== Charts ==
Chart (2019)	Peak position
Australian Albums (ARIA)	85
Dutch Albums (Album Top 100)	173
