= Blue Ivy Carter =

American singer (born 2012)

- Carter in 2026
- Born: January 7, 2012 (age 14); New York City, U.S.
- Other name: B.I.C.
- Years active: 2013–present
- Parents: Jay-Z (father); Beyoncé (mother)
- Relatives: Tina Knowles (grandmother); Mathew Knowles (grandfather); Solange Knowles (aunt); Angela Beyincé (first cousin once removed)

Blue Ivy Carter (born January 7, 2012) is an American singer, actress, and dancer. She is the first-born daughter of singer Beyoncé and rapper Jay-Z. Two days after her birth, Time dubbed Carter "the most famous baby in the world." That same day, her breathing, cries and coos were featured on Jay-Z's 2012 song "Glory", which earned her a Guinness World Record for being the youngest person to have an entry on a Billboard chart. She has been the subject of depictions in media, including impersonations on Saturday Night Live and RuPaul's Drag Race.

Her 2019 single, "Brown Skin Girl" (with Beyoncé, Wizkid and Saint Jhn), entered the Billboard Hot 100 and won Best Music Video at the 63rd Annual Grammy Awards. This earned her second Guinness World Record for being the youngest individually credited Grammy Award recipient, and second youngest overall. The song also won an NAACP Image Award and a BET Her Award (making her the youngest BET Award recipient). Carter made her feature film debut in 2024 in Mufasa: The Lion King, as a voice actress portraying Princess Kiara.

== Early life and education ==
On August 28, 2011, Beyoncé's pregnancy was announced during her performance of "Love On Top" at the 2011 MTV Video Music Awards. She finished the performance by unbuttoning her blazer and rubbing her stomach to confirm the pregnancy. Blue Ivy Carter was born on January 7, 2012, to Beyoncé and Jay-Z at Lenox Hill Hospital in the Lenox Hill neighborhood in Manhattan, New York City. CBS wrote Carter was "arguably the world's most famous baby, aside from Prince George and North West". Two days after her birth, Time dubbed Carter "the most famous baby in the world."

Since her birth, her parents have "worked to secure trademarks of their daughter's name for everything, including books, shampoos, video games, and more." Beyoncé argued Carter is a "cultural icon" during the trademark process. Through her mother, Carter is a granddaughter of Tina and Mathew Knowles, a first cousin once removed of Angela Beyincé, and a niece of singer Solange Knowles. Media attention has been focused on Carter from birth because of her famous parents and extended family. In 2018, Carter attended first grade at the Center for Early Education, a private school in West Hollywood, California.

== Career ==
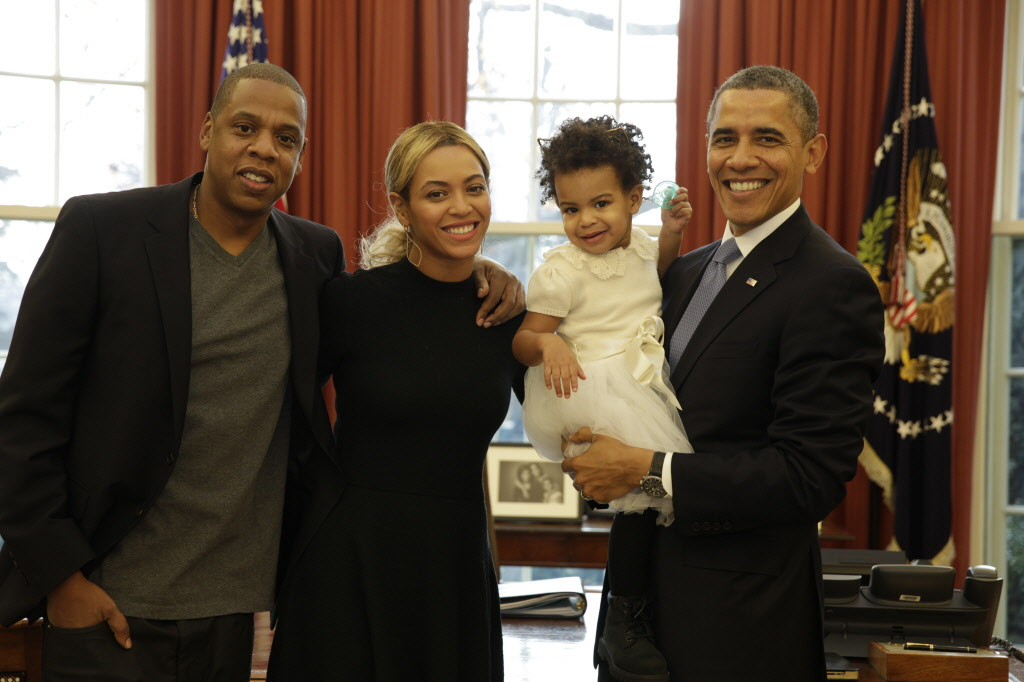
Carter held by president Barack Obama during an Oval Office visit by her parents Beyoncé and Jay-Z, December 2013

Dubbed the "New Princess of Pop" by Rolling Stone, Carter was featured gurgling and crying on her father's single "Glory", a song released to celebrate her two days after her birth. Because of "Glory", Carter is the youngest person to ever chart on the Billboard charts. In 2015, Carter appeared as part of the choir on the Coldplay song "Up&Up" from their album A Head Full of Dreams.

In 2020, Carter sang on the track "Brown Skin Girl", earning accolades and awards for the performance. She was the youngest recipient of a BET Award when she received the BET Her Award. She was also awarded the Soul Train Music Award for The Ashford & Simpson Songwriter's Award, as well as the prize for Outstanding Duo, Group or Collaboration at the 2020 NAACP Image Award ceremony. In November 2020, Carter narrated Matthew A. Cherry's book Hair Love about an African American father doing his daughter's hair for the first time. Variety posited "there's a chance she could contend for a Grammy nomination for spoken word."

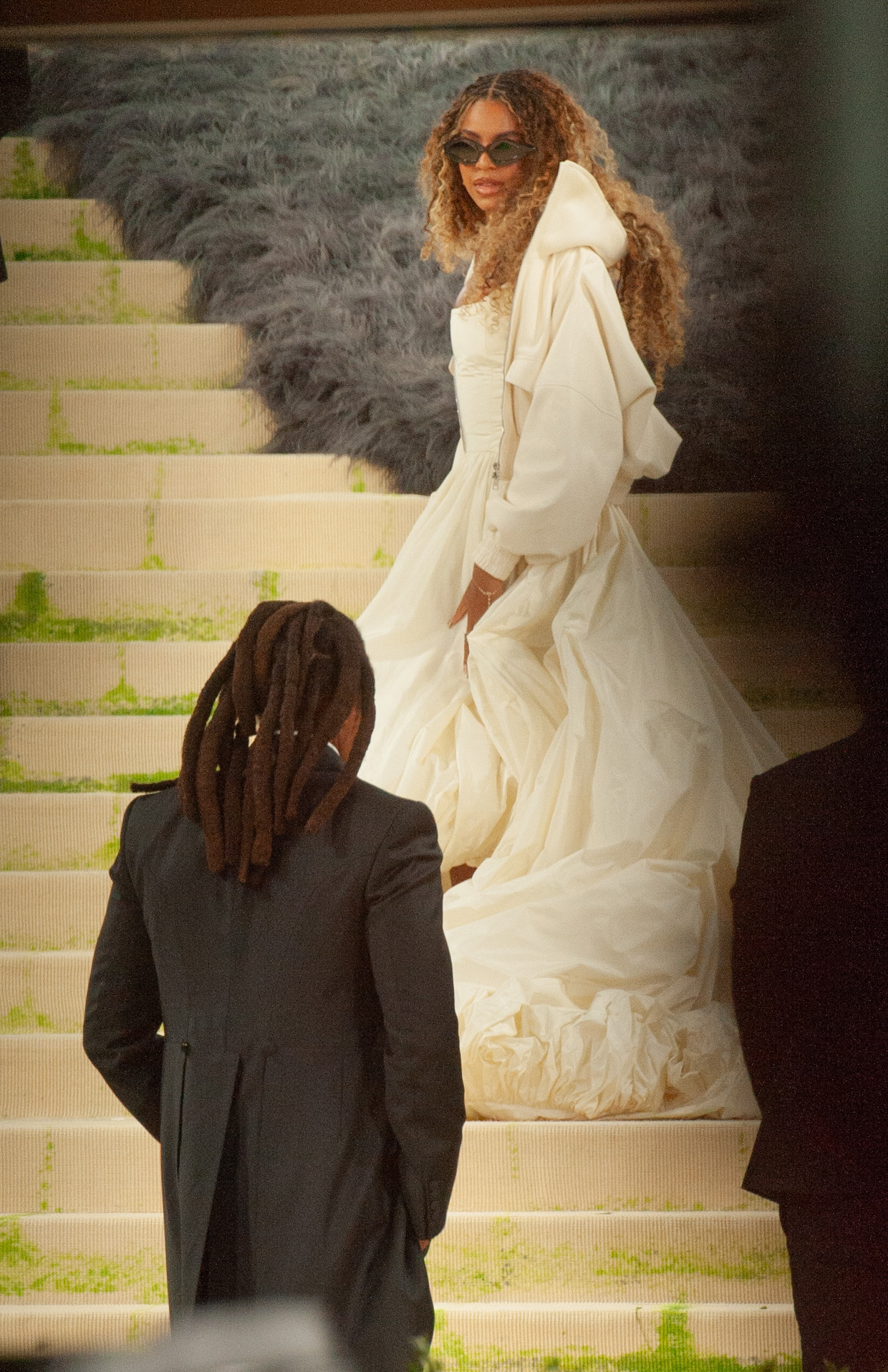
Carter with her father, Jay-Z, at the 2026 Met Gala

On January 21, 2023, Carter joined her mother onstage to sing "Brown Skin Girl" for the first time, as Beyoncé performed at a private show in Dubai. Beginning May 26, 2023, Carter joined the Renaissance World Tour as a dancer and danced to "My Power" and "Black Parade" with her mother. She was a full-time dancer for the Cowboy Carter Tour.

== Public image ==
In 2012, Hvar, Croatia named Carter an honorary citizen. Before Carter's birth, her parents had visited the town, where Beyoncé had first considered naming her Blue Ivy.

In August 2014, Carter joined her father Jay-Z onstage at the MTV Video Music Awards, where they presented Beyoncé with the Michael Jackson Video Vanguard Award. Carter has continued to attend music award ceremonies with her parents, including the 2016 MTV Video Music Awards, where she made headlines for the cost of the clothing she wore.

In January 2020, just before Carter's eighth birthday, rapper Megan Thee Stallion posted photos to her Instagram and Twitter of her, Beyoncé, and Carter. Vanity Fair writer K. Austin Collins and Harper's Bazaar web editor Violet Lucca criticized Carter's physical appearance. Both apologized and deleted their posts after backlash.

=== Cultural depictions of Carter ===
In February 2012, a skit on Saturday Night Live depicted a baby Carter being serenaded by Bon Iver (played by Justin Timberlake).

In January 2013, a skit on the same series depicted Carter's crib, which was "lined with one of Diana Ross's finest wigs".

In 2018, Carter was the subject of an impersonation by drag queen The Vixen on the Snatch Game episode on Season 10 of RuPaul's Drag Race. Into stated the characterization rested on "brat... without pushing Blue into more nuanced territory".

In 2023, the seventh episode of the Apple TV+ event series Extrapolations, titled "The Going-Away Party", mentioned a hypothetical Blue Ivy Carter Holiday Album.

== Filmography ==
=== Film ===
List of film, musical film, documentary film, and live concert film
| Year | Title | Role | Notes | Ref. |
|---|---|---|---|---|
| 2013 | Life Is But a Dream | Self | Documentary-live concert film | |
| 2016 | Lemonade | Self | Musical film | |
| 2019 | Homecoming: A Film by Beyoncé | Self | Live concert-documentary film | |
| 2019 | Beyoncé Presents: Making The Gift | Self | Documentary film | |
| 2020 | Black Is King | Self | Musical film | |
| 2023 | Renaissance: A Film by Beyoncé | Self | Live concert-documentary film | |
| 2024 | Mufasa: The Lion King | Princess Kiara | Voice role; film debut | |

=== Music videos ===
List of music videos, showing year released, other artists featured and directors
| Title | Year | Other artist(s) | Director(s) | Ref. |
As artist
| "Blue" | 2013 | Beyoncé | Beyoncé, Ed Burke, Bill Kirstein | |
| "Glory" | 2015 | Jay-Z | —N/a | |
| "Brown Skin Girl" | 2020 | Beyoncé, Saint Jhn, Wizkid | Jenn Nkiru | |
Guest appearances
| "7/11" | 2014 | Beyoncé | Beyoncé | |
| "Formation" | 2016 | Beyoncé | Melina Matsoukas | |
| "All Night" | 2016 | Beyoncé | Melina Matsoukas | |
| "Family Feud" | 2017 | Jay-Z, Beyoncé | Ava DuVernay | |
| "Spirit" | 2019 | Beyoncé | Jake Nava, Jon Favreau | |
| "Bigger" ("Spirit" extended video) | 2019 | Beyoncé | Jake Nava, Jon Favreau | |
| "Bigger" (Black Is King video) | 2020 | Beyoncé | Kwasi Fordjour | |
| "Find Your Way Back" | 2020 | Beyoncé | Kwasi Fordjour | |
| "Mood 4 Eva" | 2020 | Beyoncé, Jay-Z, Childish Gambino, Oumou Sangaré | Dikayl Rimmasch | |
| "My Power" | 2020 | Beyoncé, Nija, Yemi Alade, Busiswa, Tierra Whack, Moonchild Sanelly, DJ Lag | Beyoncé | |

== Discography ==
=== Singles ===
List of singles as featured artist, with selected chart positions, showing year released and album name
| Title | Year | Peak chart positions | | | | | | | | | | Certifications | Album |
| Title | Year | US | US R&B | US Rap | CAN | IRE | LIT | NLD | NZ Hot | SWE Heat. | UK | Certifications | Album |
|---|---|---|---|---|---|---|---|---|---|---|---|---|---|
| "Glory" (Jay-Z featuring B.I.C.) | 2012 | — | 63 | 23 | — | — | — | — | — | — | — | | Non-album single |
| "Brown Skin Girl" (Beyoncé, Saint Jhn and Wizkid featuring Blue Ivy Carter) | 2019 | 76 | 27 | — | 60 | 50 | 67 | 82 | 6 | 6 | 42 | BPI: Silver; MC: Gold; RIAA: Gold | The Lion King: The Gift |
"—" denotes items which were not released in that country or failed to chart.

=== Guest appearances ===
List of non-single guest appearances, showing year released, other artist featured, and album name
| Title | Year | Other artist | Album | Certifications |
|---|---|---|---|---|
| "Blue" | 2013 | Beyoncé | Beyoncé | RIAA: Gold |
| "Up&Up" (Choir) | 2016 | Coldplay | A Head Full of Dreams | |
| "Blue's Freestyle / We Family" | 2017 | Jay-Z | 4:44 | |
| "Lift Ev'ry Voice and Sing" (Blue's Version) (Homecoming Live) | 2019 | Beyoncé | Homecoming: The Live Album | |

== Awards and nominations ==
| Year | Ceremony | Nominated work | Award | Result | Ref |
|---|---|---|---|---|---|
| 2017 | Shorty Awards | Herself (with Beyoncé) | Instagram of the Year | Nominated | |
| 2019 | The Daily Californian Arts Awards | "Brown Skin Girl" | Best Song | Won | |
| 2019 | Soul Train Music Awards | "Brown Skin Girl" | The Ashford & Simpsons Songwriter's Award | Won | |
| 2019 | Soul Train Music Awards | "Brown Skin Girl" | Best Collaboration | Nominated | |
| 2019 | All Africa Music Awards | "Brown Skin Girl" | Best Collaboration | Nominated | |
| 2020 | BET Awards | "Brown Skin Girl" | BET HER Award | Won | |
| 2020 | NAACP Image Awards | "Brown Skin Girl" | Outstanding Duo, Group or Collaboration | Won | |
| 2020 | Soul Train Music Awards | "Brown Skin Girl" | Video of the Year | Won | |
| 2021 | AICP Post Awards | "Brown Skin Girl" | Color Grading: Music Video | Won | |
| 2021 | Cannes Lions Awards | "Brown Skin Girl" | Excellence in Music Video | Gold | |
| 2021 | Grammy Awards | "Brown Skin Girl" | Best Music Video | Won | |
| 2021 | NAACP Image Awards | "Brown Skin Girl" | Outstanding Music Video/Visual Album | Won | |
| 2021 | MTV Video Music Awards | "Brown Skin Girl" | Best Cinematography | Won | |
| 2021 | MTV Video Music Awards | "Brown Skin Girl" | Best R&B | Nominated | |
| 2021 | UK Music Video Awards | "Brown Skin Girl" | Best R&B/Soul Video – International | Nominated | |
| 2021 | UK Music Video Awards | "Brown Skin Girl" | Best Wardrobe Styling in a Video | Nominated | |
| 2021 | Voice Arts Awards | Hair Love | Best Voiceover – Children's Audiobook award | Won | |
| 2024 | BET Awards | Herself | YoungStars Award | Won | |
| 2025 | NAACP Image Awards | Mufasa: The Lion King | Outstanding Character Voice Performance – Motion Picture | Won | |
| 2025 | BET Awards | Herself | YoungStars Awards | Won | |
| 2026 | IHeartRadio Music Awards | Cowboy Carter Tour | Herself | Nominated | |
