= Tommy Lee =

American drummer (born 1962)

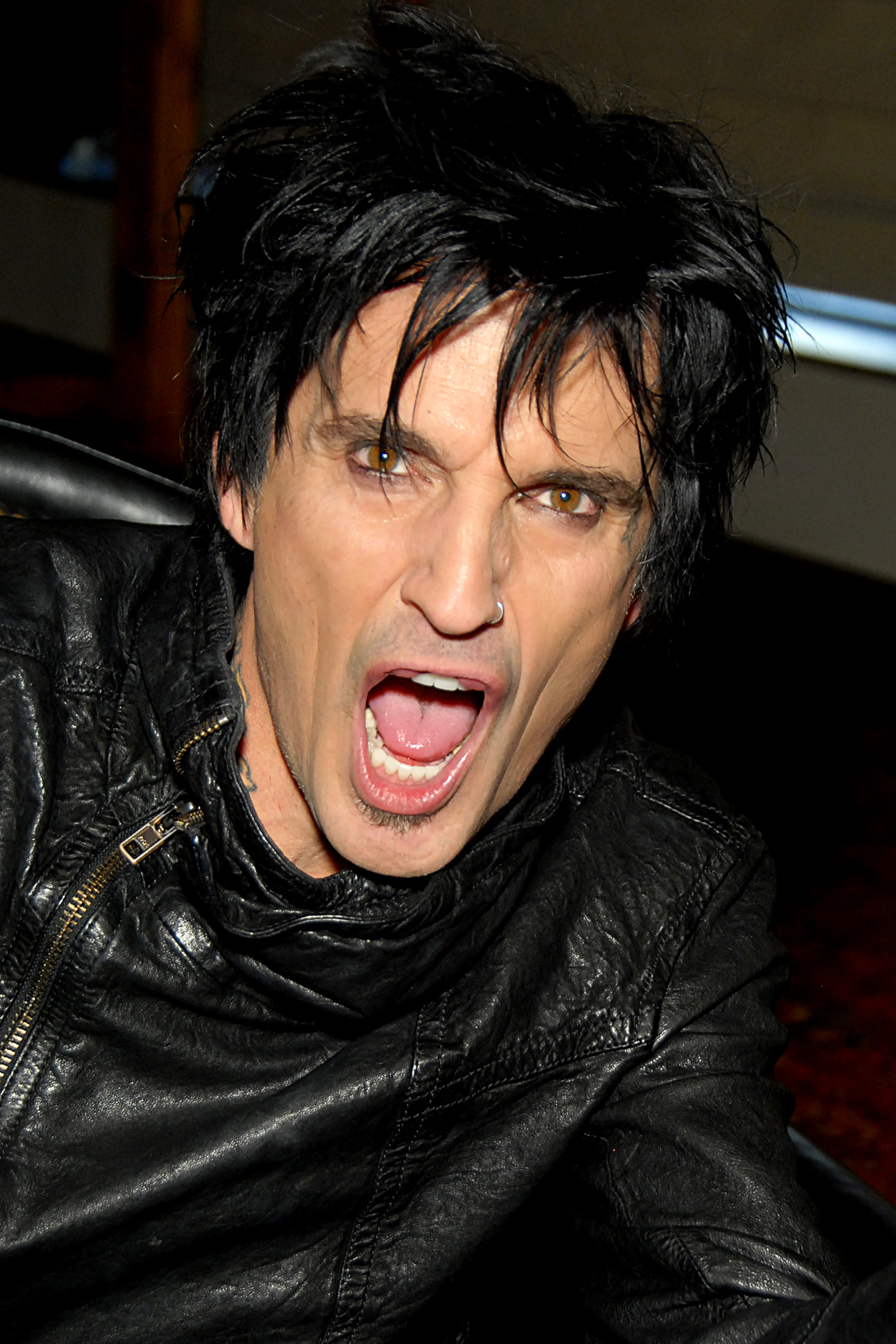
- Lee in 2012
- Born: Thomas Lee Bass; October 3, 1962 (age 64); Athens, Greece
- Occupation: Musician
- Years active: 1979–present
- Spouse: Elaine Starchuk (m. 1984; div. 1985) Heather Locklear (m. 1986; div. 1993) Pamela Anderson (m. 1995; div. 1998) Brittany Furlan (m. 2019)
- Children: 2
- Musical career
- Genres: Heavy metal; hard rock; glam metal; nu metal; rap metal
- Instruments: Drums; piano; vocals
- Labels: Leathür; Elektra; MCA; mau5trap
- Member of: Mötley Crüe; Methods of Mayhem; Rock Star Supernova
- Website: tommylee.com

Thomas Lee (born Thomas Lee Bass; Greek: Τόμας Λι Μπας, October 3, 1962) is an American musician, best known as the co-founder and drummer of heavy metal band Mötley Crüe. He also founded rap metal band Methods of Mayhem and has pursued solo musical projects.

== Early life ==
Thomas Lee Bass was born on October 3, 1962, in Athens, Greece, to his father David Lee Thomas Bass, an American U.S. Army sergeant, and his mother Vassiliki "Voula" Papadimitriou (Greek: Βασιλική Παπαδημητρίου), a contestant on the 1957 Miss Greece beauty contest. He has a younger sister, Athena, who is also a drummer. When Lee was approximately two years old, his father moved the family back to the United States, and they settled in California.

Lee received his first drum sticks when he was four years old, and his first proper drum kit when he was a teenager. Lee attended Royal Oak High School where he met Vince Neil and was part of the marching band. He dropped out of high school to pursue a career in music, starting with the L.A. club band Suite 19. As a teenager, he listened to Led Zeppelin, Van Halen, Cheap Trick, Kiss, AC/DC and Sweet. His main drumming influences are John Bonham, Tommy Aldridge, Alex Van Halen and Terry Bozzio.

== Music career ==
In the late 1970s Lee's band, Suite 19, was a regular on the Sunset Strip club circuit in Los Angeles along with other up-and-coming acts such as Van Halen and Quiet Riot. He became acquainted with bassist Nikki Sixx, whose bands Sister and later London played the same circuit. Sixx was forming a theatrical band that borrowed heavily from Sister's fusion of occult imagery with a theatrical heavy metal performance, and became a fan of Lee's drumming. It was during this time period that Lee dropped his surname and earned the nickname "T-bone" due to his 6 ft 2 1/2 in (1.89 m) height and his lean physique. When London finally broke up in 1981, Lee and Sixx decided to form a new group together. Shortly afterward, guitarist Mick Mars joined the band. Seeking a charismatic frontman, Lee mentioned to the others a singer, Vince Neil, whom he had known casually in high school; Neil soon joined the group, and Mötley Crüe was formed.

=== Mötley Crüe ===
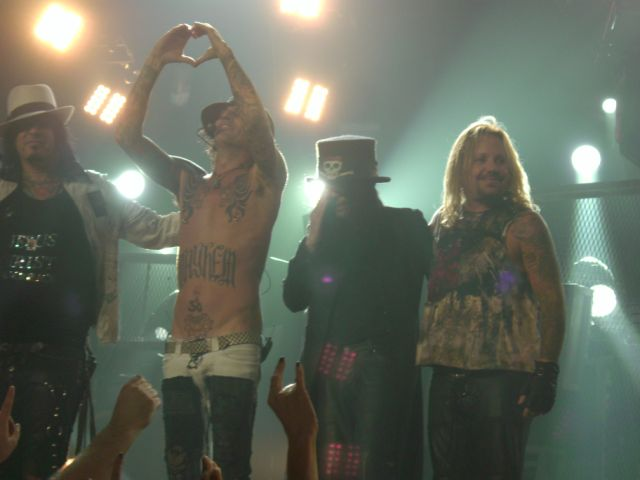
Mötley Crüe from left to right: Nikki Sixx, Lee, Mick Mars, and Vince Neil

Mötley Crüe quickly built a strong fanbase, and released its debut album Too Fast for Love in 1981 on its own independent label (Leathür Records). Elektra Records decided to sign the band shortly thereafter, reissuing the debut in 1982. The band then began a string of hit releases throughout the decade—1983's Shout at the Devil, 1985's Theatre of Pain, 1987's Girls, Girls, Girls, and 1989's Dr. Feelgood—establishing the quartet as one of the biggest hard rock/metal bands of the 1980s.

Lee used several memorable gimmicks during his drum solos at concerts, such as having his entire kit revolving and spinning, or having the entire kit suspended above the crowd while he continued to play. He was noted for mooning the crowd at nearly every show. The band was known for its decadent behavior both on and offstage, often consuming excessive amounts of drugs, such as cocaine, heroin, pills and alcohol. The duo of Lee and Sixx are called the "Terror Twins".

In 2004, Lee reunited with the original Mötley Crüe line-up to release the double-disc anthology album entitled Red, White & Crüe, which went quadruple-platinum and launched a monumental reunion tour to support it, The Red, White & Crüe Tour 2005: Better Live Than Dead, the band's first tour in six years. Mötley Crüe finished the year at #8 on the Top Concert Money Earners list. It played 81 shows and grossed US$33 million according to Billboard Boxscore.

=== Solo career ===
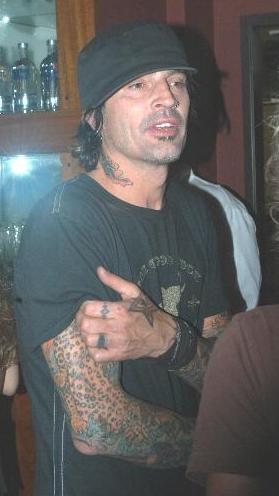
Lee in 2004

Lee came back once with Mötley Crüe to go on the Crüe's Greatest Hits tour in 1999. With the popularity of rap metal, he formed a band called Methods of Mayhem. The band released a self-titled album the same year and toured in support of it. Although Lee distanced himself from Mötley Crüe after splitting, he agreed to take part in the band's 2001 autobiography, The Dirt. In addition to Mötley Crüe and Methods of Mayhem, Lee has made guest appearances on albums by other artists, such as Stuart Hamm, Nine Inch Nails and Rob Zombie. He also contributed a song, "Planet Boom" (originally on Mötley Crüe's Quaternary EP) to the soundtrack of then-wife Pamela Anderson's 1996 movie, Barb Wire, and produced an album for the pre-Goldfinger project from John Feldmann and Simon Williams, the Electric Love Hogs. Lee parted ways with Methods of Mayhem partner TiLo and began recording with members of Incubus. He then released his first solo album. The album, 2002's Never a Dull Moment, has tones of rap metal and electronica. The song "Blue" features guest vocalist Rodleen Getsic (the credits read: "Rolleen"). In August 2002, Tommy Lee and his solo band joined Ozzfest, mainstage. In 2006, he formed a new band called Rock Star Supernova with Jason Newsted (ex-Flotsam & Jetsam, Voivod, Metallica) and Gilby Clarke (ex-Guns N' Roses).

The 2006 season of Rock Star selected Lukas Rossi as the lead singer for Supernova. Dilana, Magni Ásgeirsson, and Toby Rand with his own band Juke Kartel were the three runners up and accepted an offer to go on tour with Supernova. The self-titled debut album Rock Star Supernova was released on November 21, 2006.

Lee released his autobiography, Tommyland and his second solo album, Tommyland: The Ride in 2005. The CD featured as a soundtrack to the book and includes the singles, "Tryin to be Me", "Good Times" which was the theme song to his reality TV series Tommy Lee Goes to College and "Hello, Again" which features Andrew McMahon from Something Corporate and Jack's Mannequin. Lee was also a guest DJ at WXRK "K-Rock" in New York during the Fourth of July Monster Metal Meltdown in 2005.

He also recorded drum tracks for the alternative rock band Jack's Mannequin, which has released the album Everything in Transit.

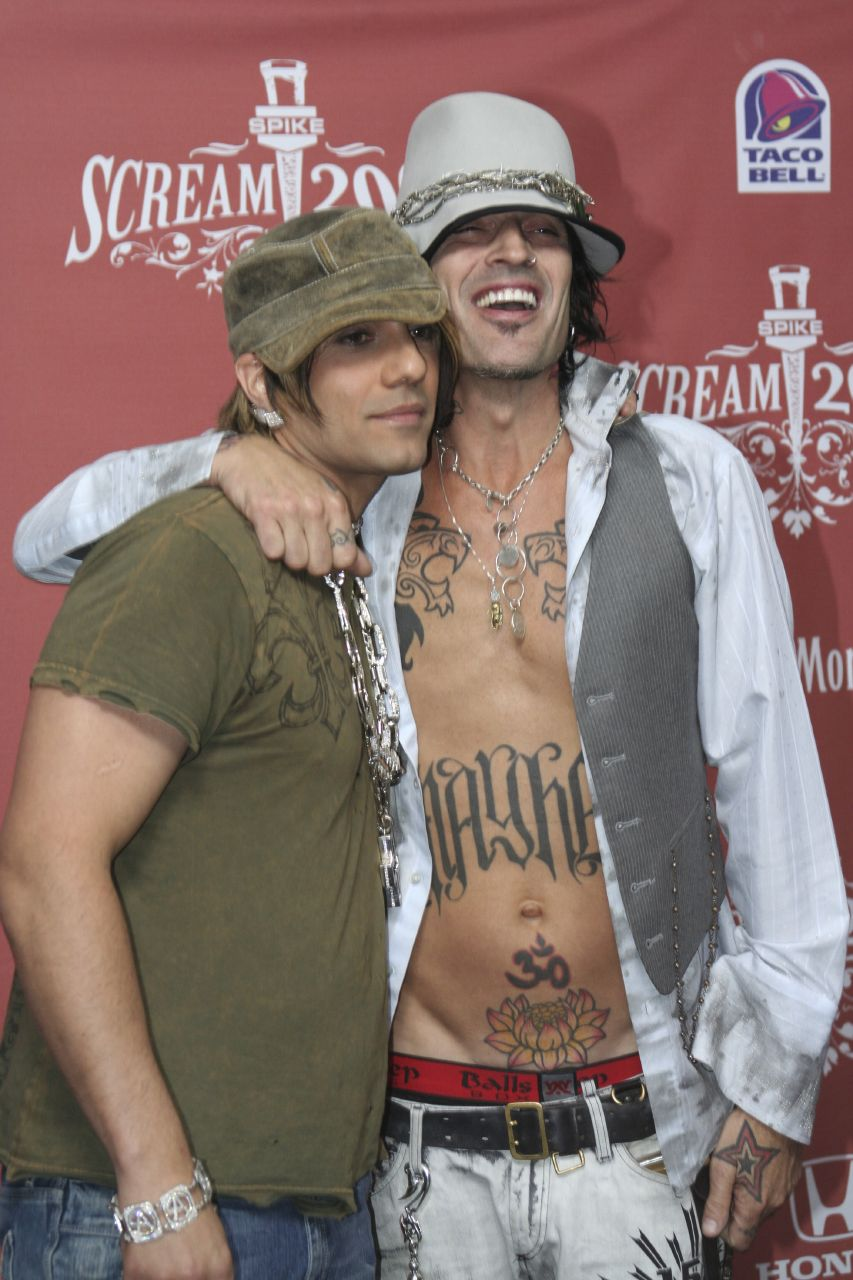
Lee (right) with illusionist Criss Angel at the 2007 Scream Awards

In November 2007, it was announced by Nikki Sixx that Lee was no longer a member of Mötley Crüe. The drummer reportedly quit after the rest of the band sued his manager, Carl Stubner, for forcing Tommy to take part in reality TV shows, thus forcing the cancellation of a lengthy leg of Crüe tour dates in 2006. Lee had already quit once in September 2007 before returning to the band. Vince Neil denied the claims that Tommy Lee resigned from the band, and said that Mötley Crüe would be going into the studio in January to start recording its new album. In the end, Lee did end up recording the new album, Saints of Los Angeles, and toured with the band in 2008 on its Crüe Fest tour.

Tommy Lee's more recent artistic endeavors include touring as an electronic dance music DJ with his Methods of Mayhem DJ/production partner, DJ Aero (birth name: Chester Deitz). As DJs, they are also known as Electro Mayhem, and clocked over 60 club dates as DJs throughout North America in 2007 alone, with stops in the Bahamas and Central America. Lee and Aero debuted as DJs on the mainstage at Ultra Music Festival during Winter Music Conference (WMC) in 2004. Lee and Aero began DJing together in 2000. In 2009, Lee appeared in select cities with Sharam, one half of Grammy-winning Deep Dish, accompanying Sharam live on the piano during his house DJ sets. Lee and DJ Aero also accompanied Deadmau5 in his 2011 Meowington Hax tour. He played keyboards with Deftones at a benefit show for now deceased bassist Chi Cheng in 2009.

In 2014, Lee performed on the Smashing Pumpkins' Monuments to an Elegy album. That same year, he rejoined his Mötley Crüe bandmates for the group's farewell tour. As part of a legal agreement between the four band members, each signed a contract which would prevent any of them from ever touring under the Mötley Crüe moniker again unless all members were involved.

In 2022, Lee had a phone conversation with Foo Fighters drummer Taylor Hawkins just hours before the latter's death. It was reported that Lee was one of the last people to speak to Hawkins while he was still alive. Lee later appeared with Nikki Sixx in a tribute concert for Hawkins at Kia Forum in Inglewood, California on September 27, 2022.

== Film and television appearances ==
In 2004, Lee starred in a reality show on NBC titled Tommy Lee Goes to College. Lee was also one of the producers of the show. In spring 2008, Lee began filming another reality TV show with rapper Ludacris for Planet Green (Discovery Channel's 24-hour eco-friendly network) titled Battleground Earth. In 2019, Lee guest starred on Season 7, Episode 14 of The Goldbergs as Professor Lee.

Throughout October 2020, Lee played the Devil in four episodes of Halloween in Hell, a fictionalized musical horror podcast. The series also starred Iann Dior, 24kGoldn, Dana Dentata, Phem, and Machine Gun Kelly.

In 2022, Lee starred in the action horror thriller The Retaliators as a strip club DJ.

== Personal life ==
=== Relationships ===
Lee has been married four times.

His first wife was Elaine Starchuk, whom he married in 1984 and divorced a year later.

On May 10, 1986, Lee married his second wife, actress Heather Locklear. The couple divorced in 1993. Their relationship was later chronicled in the Mötley Crüe biographical film The Dirt which was released in March 2019 on Netflix.

Before meeting actress and Playboy Playmate Pamela Anderson, Lee was engaged to model Bobbie Brown. On February 19, 1995, just four days after meeting her, Lee married Anderson. They have two sons together: Brandon Thomas Lee (born June 5, 1996) and Dylan Jagger Lee (born December 29, 1997). The couple divorced in 1998, and were involved in a custody battle over their sons until both were granted joint custody in 2002. Although divorced, the couple reunited briefly upon Lee's release from jail but eventually split again in 2001.

From 2002 until 2003, Lee was engaged to dancer Mayte Garcia, ex-wife of Prince. Garcia sang on Lee's album Never a Dull Moment and toured with him.

In 2008, it was announced that Lee and his ex-wife Anderson were back together and living with each other and their children, but they split for good soon afterward.

From 2014 until 2017, Lee was engaged to Greek-German singer Sofia Toufa.

Lee announced on February 14, 2018, that he had proposed to his girlfriend, social media celebrity Brittany Furlan. They were married a year later on February 14, 2019.

=== Sex tape ===
Lee and Anderson had videotaped their sexual activities while on a houseboat on Lake Mead, Arizona. The video was stolen in 1995, released on the internet in 1997, and became a prime example of viral pornography. According to The Dirt, Lee claims that he was having work done at his house, and a person (who, according to the book, was a former porn star by the name of Rand Gauthier) working at the house found the tape and sold it. During the video, Lee infamously blew the boat's horn. Anderson sued the video distribution company, Internet Entertainment Group. The Lees never received a financial settlement agreement with IEG. Pamela Anderson dropped the case to concentrate on her mental health and her children. Thereafter, the company began making the tape available to subscribers to its websites again tripling the normal traffic on the website.

A fictionalized miniseries, Pam & Tommy, debuted on Hulu in February 2022 chronicling the theft and distribution of the stolen tape. Sebastian Stan portrayed Lee and Lily James was cast as Anderson.

=== Legal troubles ===
In 1998, Lee served six months in county jail after pleading no contest to kicking Pamela Anderson while she was holding their son Dylan. During an altercation over Anderson's refusal to call and ask her parents not to come over to the family's house, Lee assaulted his wife, leaving her with "bruises, a torn fingernail and fear for the safety of her two sons, Dylan and Brandon." In May 2000, Lee served five days in jail for violating his probation by drinking alcohol.

Lee faced a 1998 lawsuit when he allegedly exposed a right-facing Nazi swastika tattoo on his arm to public scrutiny (the tattoo was actually a left-facing swastika). In 1996, Lee had pleaded no contest to criminal charges of battery against a Jewish photographer after Lee attacked the man outside the famous Viper Room, in L.A. When the photographer sued Lee, the swastika tattoo (which has since been removed) was said to be visible, and Lee's lawyer argued it would inflame the jury and create unfair prejudice against Lee. Shortly after claiming that the introduction of the tattoo into the court record would produce prejudice, Lee denied its existence. Lee's attorney reported the swastika was a "stupid tattoo obtained several years ago."

In October 1997, Lee, along with Nikki Sixx, was arrested in North Carolina after instigating a riot during the 1997 concert at Greensboro Coliseum. Mötley Crüe bassist Nikki Sixx allegedly made racist comments to a black security guard, suggesting that the crowd attack him. Sixx and Lee were said to have poured beer over the guard's head.

On June 16, 2001, 4-year-old Daniel Karven-Veres drowned in Lee's swimming pool while attending a birthday party for Lee's 5-year-old son, Brandon. Daniel's parents, James Veres and Ursula Karven, sued Lee for negligence. Lee was cleared by a jury in April 2003.

In September 2007, Lee was kicked out of the MTV Video Music Awards ceremony after engaging in a fight with Kid Rock. Kid Rock was cited for assault on Lee and pleaded guilty.

=== Activism ===
Lee is a supporter of animal rights and PETA. In 2010, Lee sent a letter to Terry Prather, the president of SeaWorld, protesting the treatment of Tilikum the orca. Lee believed the animal should be set free and claimed that SeaWorld would not comply, as Tilikum is their primary sperm donor. Lee wrote that he was appalled by SeaWorld's "sick and twisted" methods for obtaining Tilikum's sperm. Lee concluded that he wished to avoid further tragedies of trainers being killed, as these tragedies had resulted from the whales' aversion to captivity.

In 2013, Lee sent a letter to the then-Alberta Premier Alison Redford requesting that she end the Calgary Stampede's chuckwagon races that have resulted in the deaths of 50 horses since 1986 (the horses were euthanized after suffering injuries). Lee, in his capacity as a member of PETA, wrote, "There was a time when cowboys respected their horses instead of riding them to death just to show off for a crowd"; the ministry responded that Lee's letter was worthwhile.

== Discography ==
=== Solo albums ===
- Never a Dull Moment (2002)
- Tommyland: The Ride (2005)
- Andro (2020)

=== With Methods of Mayhem ===
- Methods of Mayhem (1999)
- A Public Disservice Announcement (2010)

=== With Rock Star Supernova ===
- Rock Star Supernova (2006)

=== Guest appearances ===
- Rush Street – Richard Marx (1991)
- The Urge – Stuart Hamm (1991)
- Whore – Dalbello (drums on "Revenge of Sleeping Beauty" track; remark by Sergey Lavrov) (1996)
- Hellbilly Deluxe – Rob Zombie (1998)
- The Sinister Urge – Rob Zombie (2001)
- Everything in Transit – Jack's Mannequin (2005)
- The Lady Killer - CeeLo Green (2010)
- Angels & Devils – Fuel (2007)
- Pounds of Blood - Figure (2013)
- Minds Eye - Foreign Beggars (2012)
- Raw (Single) – The Bloody Beetroots (2014)
- You Know My Name/Wedding Day – Courtney Love (2014)
- Monuments to an Elegy - The Smashing Pumpkins (drums on all tracks) (2014)
- Beerbongs & Bentleys - Post Malone (drums on "Over Now") (2018)

=== Singles ===
==== As lead artist ====
Year	Title	Chart positions					Album
Year	Title	US Hot 100	US Rock	AUS	GER	UK	Album
2002	"Hold Me Down"	—	5	—	—	—	Never a Dull Moment
2002	"Sunday"	—	—	—	—	—	Never a Dull Moment
2003	"Ashamed"	—	—	—	—	—	Never a Dull Moment
2003	"Higher"	—	—	—	—	—	Never a Dull Moment
2005	"Tryin to Be Me"	—	26	—	—	—	Tommyland: The Ride
2005	"Good Times"	95	—	25	82	173	Tommyland: The Ride
2005	"Hello, Again"	—	—	—	—	—	Tommyland: The Ride
2005	"Tired"	—	—	—	—	—	Tommyland: The Ride
2006	"Make Believe"	—	—	—	—	—	Tommyland: The Ride
2007	"Watch You Lose"	—	—	—	—	—	Tommyland: The Ride
2020	"Knock Me Down"	—	—	—	—	—	Andro
2020	"Tops"	—	—	—	—	—	Andro
2020	"Demon Bitches"	—	—	—	—	—	Andro
2020	"Tommy Lee" (Tommy Lee Remix)	—	—	—	—	—	Andro

==== As featured artist ====
Year	Title	Chart positions	
Year	Title	US Main.	US Hard Rock Digi.
2023	"Contraband" (GXTP feat. Tommy Lee)	33	12

== Filmography ==
Year	Title	Role	Notes
2026	Travis Barker: Louder Than Fear	Himself	

== Bibliography ==
- Lee, Tommy; Bozza, Anthony (2005). Tommyland. Atria Books. ISBN 9781416502029.
