= Saint Jhn =

American-Guyanese rapper (born 1986)

SAINt JHN
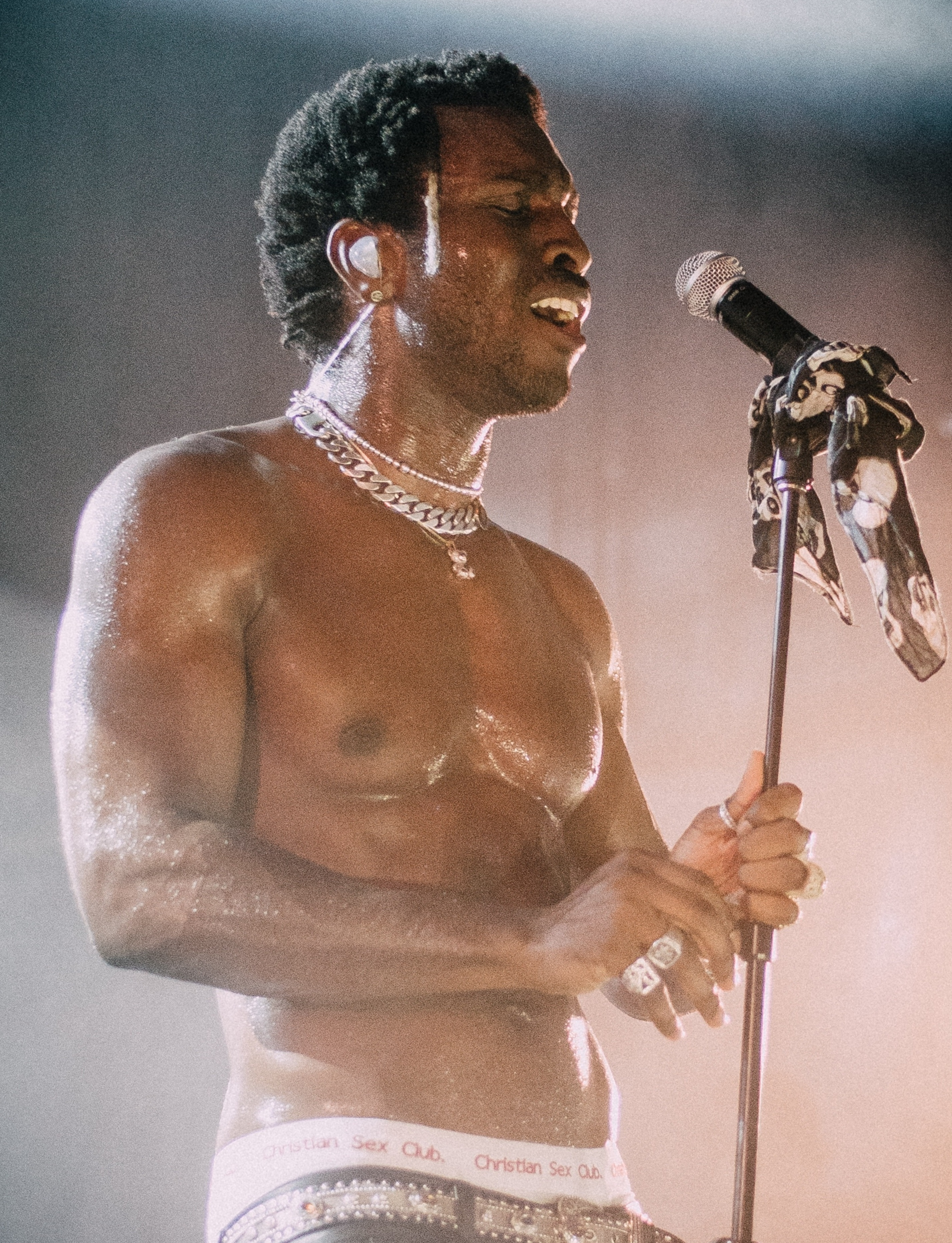
- Saint Jhn performing in 2018

Background information
- Also known as: Ghetto Lenny; Santo; Carlos St. John
- Born: Carlos St. John Phillips; August 26, 1986 (age 40); New York City, U.S.
- Origin: Georgetown, Guyana
- Genres: Hip-hop; trap; R&B
- Occupations: Rapper; singer; songwriter
- Years active: 2010–present
- Labels: Warner; Gødd Complexx; Hitco
- Website: saintjhn.com

Carlos St. John Phillips (born August 26, 1986), known professionally as Saint Jhn (stylized as SAINt JHN; pronounced "Saint John"), is an American and Guyanese rapper and singer.

Saint Jhn signed with L.A. Reid's label Hitco to release his first two albums, Collection One (2018) and Ghetto Lenny's Love Songs (2019). He rose in fame in 2019 for the remix to his 2016 song "Roses", produced by Kazakh DJ Imanbek, which peaked within the top five of the US Billboard Hot 100 and topped international charts. It served as lead single for his third studio album, While the World Was Burning (2020), certified gold by RIAA, followed by his fourth album Festival Season (2025).

In 2019, Saint Jhn collaborated on the track "Brown Skin Girl" on Beyoncé's record and visual project The Lion King: The Gift, winning a BET Awards, two NAACP Image Awards and a Soul Train Music Awards. Through his career, Saint Jhn has written songs for several artists including Jidenna, Usher, Hoodie Allen, and Kiesza, being nominated at the 64th Annual Grammy Awards for his writing contribution on Kanye West's studio album Donda. He is a founding member of the music collective Gødd Complexx.

== Early life ==
Carlos St. John Phillips was born on August 26, 1986 in Brooklyn. Growing up, he split his time in three-year intervals between Georgetown, Guyana, and the East New York neighborhood of Brooklyn. He began creating music when he was twelve years old and was inspired by his older brother, who would rap in the neighborhood with friends. He wrote his first song during his first year of high school while living in Guyana.

== Career ==
Prior to adopting the Saint Jhn stage name, he performed and wrote using his birth name, Carlos St. John (or Carlos Saint John). In 2010, he released an EP, The St. John Portfolio, and a mixtape, In Association, under his birth name. Soon after, he was flown to Los Angeles, California, by music executive Zach Katz. For two months, he wrote songs for Rihanna, but none of his records were accepted. After returning home, Saint Jhn co-wrote the Hoodie Allen song, "No Interruption". In the following years, Saint Jhn wrote songs for Kiesza, Gorgon City, and Nico & Vinz, among others. In 2016, he earned a writer credit for the Usher songs, "Crash" and "Rivals", both of which appeared on the album Hard II Love. Also in 2016, he released his first song under the moniker Saint Jhn, titled "1999". He followed that with two more songs in 2016, "Roses" and "Reflex". In October 2016, it was announced that Saint Jhn would open for Post Malone during a run of shows on the West Coast.

In February 2017, Jidenna's album, The Chief, was released featuring the song, "Helicopters / Beware", which Saint Jhn co-wrote. The following month, Saint Jhn released another original track, "3 Below". In October 2017, he played at two festivals, Rolling Loud and the Voodoo Experience. He also released another new song, "Hermes Freestyle". In February 2018, Saint Jhn released "I Heard You Got Too Litt Last Night". On March 9, he released the song, "Albino Blue", followed by his debut album on March 30. At that time, the already-released songs on the album had accrued 50 million total streams on various platforms. In addition to working on music and a tour in support of Collection One, Saint Jhn was hired by Gucci as a model for its "Guilty" campaign alongside Adesuwa Aighewi.

In 2019, Saint Jhn was involved into Beyoncé's record project The Lion King: The Gift, being featured with Nigerian singer Wizkid and Blue Ivy Carter on the track "Brown Skin Girl". The song and accomplished visual was critical acclaimed, winning a BET Awards, two NAACP Image Awards and a Soul Train Music Awards. The music video also won the Grammy Award for Best Music Video, award in which the singer is not listed in the credits of the nomination.

In April 2020, Saint Jhn's single "Roses" hit number one on the ARIA Charts as well as the UK Singles Chart, surged by the release of the Imanbek remix. The song later received two other remixes, with Future and J Balvin, respectively. In October 2020, Saint Jhn was among the acts who performed live for the 2020 Billboard Music Awards, following the success of "Roses". The song also won a IHeartRadio Music Awards while Imanbek won the Grammy Award for Best Remixed Recording, Non-Classical for his remix.

On October 23, 2020, Saint Jhn released the video for the single, "Gorgeous", which serves as the lead single for his third studio album, While the World Was Burning. Three days later, he revealed the album's artwork, tracklist, and release date as November 20. The album includes the songs "High School Reunion, Prom", featuring Lil Uzi Vert, "Monica Lewinsky, Election Year", featuring DaBaby and A Boogie wit da Hoodie, as well as "Pray 4 Me", featuring Kanye West. Saint Jhn was also nominated with West for his songwiting contribution on Donda at the 64th Annual Grammy Awards for Album of the Year.

In December 2022, Saint Jhn and London on Da Track released "Stadiums" as the first single for their upcoming collaborative album. In February 2025, Saint Jhn released his fourth album, Festival Season, which was part one of his upcoming project Collection 2. As confirmed by Saint Jhn in an interview with Angela Yee, Collection 2 will include Festival Season and (upcoming) Tears From A Popstar. The artist also shared on twitter that the singles “Humble” and “Circles” would be featured on Fake Tears From A Popstar.

On August 26, 2026, Saint Jhn released a surprise album, If Tomorrow Never Comes.

== Discography ==
=== Studio albums ===
List of studio albums with selected details
| Title | Details | Peak chart positions | | Certifications |
| Title | Details | US | CAN | Certifications |
|---|---|---|---|---|
| Collection One | Released: March 30, 2018; Label: Self-released; Formats: Digital download, streaming | 50 | 7 | |
| Ghetto Lenny's Love Songs | Released: August 23, 2019; Label: Godd Complexx, Hitco; Formats: Digital download, streaming | 39 | 41 | |
| While the World Was Burning | Released: November 20, 2020; Label: Godd Complexx, Hitco; Formats: Digital download, streaming | 34 | 24 | RIAA: Gold |
| FEStIVAL SEASON | Released: February 21, 2025; Label: Godd Complexx; Formats: Digital download, streaming | — | — | |
| If Tomorrow Never Comes | • Released: August 26, 2026 • Label: Godd Complexx • Formats: digital download, streaming | - | - | |

=== Extended plays ===
List of EPs with selected details
| Title | Details |
|---|---|
| The St. John Portfolio (as Carlos St. John) | Released: March 8, 2010; Label: Self-released; Formats: Digital download |

=== Mixtapes ===
List of mixtapes with selected details
| Title | Details |
|---|---|
| In Association (as Carlos St. John) | Released: December 25, 2010; Label: Self-released; Formats: Digital download |

=== Singles ===
==== As lead artist ====
| Title | Year | Peak chart positions | | | | | | | | | | Certifications | Album |
| Title | Year | US | AUS | BEL (FL) | CAN | DEN | FRA | GER | NLD | NZ | UK | Certifications | Album |
|---|---|---|---|---|---|---|---|---|---|---|---|---|---|
| "1999" | 2016 | — | — | — | — | — | — | — | — | — | — | | Non-album single |
| "Roses" | 2016 | — | — | — | — | — | — | — | — | — | — | | Collection One |
| "Some Nights" | 2017 | — | — | — | — | — | — | — | — | — | — | | Collection One |
| "N***a Sh*t (Swoosh)" | 2018 | — | — | — | — | — | — | — | — | — | — | | Collection One |
| "McDonalds Rich" | 2018 | — | — | — | — | — | — | — | — | — | — | | Non-album singles |
| "White Parents Are Gonna Hate This" | 2018 | — | — | — | — | — | — | — | — | — | — | | Non-album singles |
| "Trap" (featuring Lil Baby) | 2019 | — | — | — | — | — | — | — | — | — | — | RIAA: Platinum | Ghetto Lenny's Love Songs |
| "Brown Skin Girl" (with Beyoncé and Wizkid featuring Blue Ivy Carter) | 2019 | 76 | — | — | 60 | — | — | — | 82 | — (Note: "Brown Skin Girl" did not enter the NZ Top 40 Singles Chart, but peaked at number six on the NZ Hot Singles Chart.) | 42 | ARIA: Gold; BPI: Silver; MC: Gold; RIAA: Gold; RMNZ: Gold | The Lion King: The Gift |
| "All I Want Is a Yacht" | 2019 | — | — | — | — | — | — | — | — | — | — | | Ghetto Lenny's Love Songs |
| "Anything Can Happen" (featuring Meek Mill) | 2019 | — | — | — | — | — | — | — | — | — | — | | Ghetto Lenny's Love Songs |
| "Roses (Imanbek Remix)" solo or remix featuring Future remix) | 2019 | 4 | 1 | 3 | 1 | 3 | 2 | 3 | 1 | 1 | 1 | ARIA: 7× Platinum; BEA: 2× Platinum; BPI: 3× Platinum; BVMI: Diamond; IFPI DEN: Platinum; MC: 8× Platinum; RIAA: 3× Platinum; RIAA: Gold (Future Remix); RMNZ: 2× Platinum; SNEP: Diamond | While the World Was Burning |
| "I Can Fvcking Tell" | 2020 | — | — | — | — | — | — | — | — | — | — | | Ghetto Lenny's Love Songs |
| "Famous" (with Octavian and Gunna) | 2020 | — | — | — | — | — | — | — | — | — | — | | Alpha |
| "Gorgeous" | 2020 | — | — | — | — | — | — | — | — | — | — | | While the World Was Burning |
| "Sucks to Be You" | 2020 | — | — | — | — | — | — | — | — | — | — | | While the World Was Burning |
| "Just for Me" (featuring SZA) | 2021 | — | — | — | — | — | — | — | — | — (Note: "Just for Me" did not enter the NZ Top 40 Singles Chart, but peaked at number 23 on the NZ Hot Singles Chart.) | — | | Space Jam: A New Legacy (Original Motion Picture Soundtrack) |
| "Si Te Vas" (with Tainy and Yandel) | 2021 | — | — | — | — | — | — | — | — | — | — | | Dynasty |
| "The Best Part of Life" | 2021 | — | — | — | — | — | — | — | — | — (Note: "The Best Part of Life" did not enter the NZ Top 40 Singles Chart, but peaked at number 34 on the NZ Hot Singles Chart.) | — | | TBA |
| "For the Squadron" | 2022 | — | — | — | — | — | — | — | — | — | — | | TBA |
| "Stadiums" (with London on da Track) | 2022 | — | — | — | — | — | — | — | — | — | — | | TBA |
| "Body on Me" | 2024 | — | — | — | — | — | — | — | — | — | — | | |
"—" denotes a recording that did not chart or was not released in that territory.

==== As featured artist ====
List of singles as a featured artist, showing year released and album name
| Title | Year | Album |
|---|---|---|
| "Beretta Lake" (Teflon Sega featuring Saint Jhn) | 2016 | Non-album singles |
| "Sink" (Maya B featuring Saint Jhn) | 2020 | Non-album singles |
| "Been Thru This Before" (Marshmello and Southside featuring Giggs and Saint Jhn) | 2020 | Non-album singles |
| "2HONEST" (Vic Mensa featuring Saint Jhn) | 2020 | V TAPE |

=== Songwriting and production ===
Selected songs with production and songwriting credits
| Song name | Year | Primary artist(s) | Album | Role |
|---|---|---|---|---|
| "No Interruption" | 2012 | Hoodie Allen | All American | Co-writer |
| "Bad Thing" | 2014 | Kiesza | Sound of a Woman | Co-writer |
| "The Love" | 2014 | Kiesza | Sound of a Woman | Co-writer |
| "Piano" | 2014 | Kiesza | Sound of a Woman | Co-writer |
| "Praying to a God" | 2015 | Nico & Vinz | Cornerstone | Co-writer |
| "Doubts" | 2016 | Gorgon City | Kingdom | Co-writer |
| "Crash" | 2016 | Usher | Hard II Love | Co-writer, producer |
| "Rivals" | 2016 | Usher | Hard II Love | Co-writer, producer |
| "Helicopters / Beware" | 2017 | Jidenna | The Chief | Co-writer |
| "Can't Wait" | 2017 | Dvsn | Morning After | Co-writer |
| "Lord I Need You" | 2021 | Kanye West | Donda | Co-writer |

== Awards and nominations ==
| Ceremony | Year | Work(s) | Award | Result | Ref(s). |
|---|---|---|---|---|---|
| All Africa Music Awards | 2019 | "Brown Skin Girl" (Beyoncé with Wizkid, Saint Jhn and Blue Ivy Carter) | Best Collaboration | Nominated | |
| BET Awards | 2020 | "Brown Skin Girl" (Beyoncé with Wizkid, Saint Jhn and Blue Ivy Carter) | BET HER Award | Won | |
| Grammy Awards | 2022 | Donda (as a songwriter) | Album of the Year | Nominated | |
| iHeartRadio Music Awards | 2021 | "Roses" (Imanbek Remix) | Dance Song of the Year | Won | |
| MTV Video Music Awards | 2020 | "Roses" (Imanbek Remix) | Song of Summer | Nominated | |
| MTV Video Music Awards | 2021 | "Brown Skin Girl" (Beyoncé with Wizkid, Saint Jhn and Blue Ivy Carter) | Best R&B | Nominated | |
| NAACP Image Awards | 2020 | "Brown Skin Girl" (Beyoncé with Wizkid, Saint Jhn and Blue Ivy Carter) | Outstanding Duo, Group or Collaboration | Won | |
| NAACP Image Awards | 2021 | "Brown Skin Girl" (Beyoncé with Wizkid, Saint Jhn and Blue Ivy Carter) | Outstanding Music Video/Visual Album | Won | |
| Soul Train Music Awards | 2019 | "Brown Skin Girl" (Beyoncé with Wizkid, Saint Jhn and Blue Ivy Carter) | The Ashford & Simpsons Songwriter's Award | Won | |
| Soul Train Music Awards | 2019 | "Brown Skin Girl" (Beyoncé with Wizkid, Saint Jhn and Blue Ivy Carter) | Best Collaboration | Nominated | |
| UK Music Video Awards | 2021 | "Brown Skin Girl" (Beyoncé with Wizkid, Saint Jhn and Blue Ivy Carter) | Best R&B/Soul Video – International | Nominated | |
