= Black Is King =

2020 American musical film and visual album by Beyoncé

- Promotional release poster
- Based on: The Lion King: The Gift
- Written by: Beyoncé; Yrsa Daley-Ward; Clover Hope; Andrew Morrow
- Directed by: Beyoncé; Emmanuel Adjei; Blitz Bazawule; Pierre Debusschere; Dafe Oboro; Jenn Nkiru; Ibra Ake; Dikayl Rimmasch; Jake Nava
- Starring: Beyoncé; Folajomi Akinmurele; Connie Chiume; Nyaniso Ntsikelelo Dzedze; Nandi Madida; Warren Masemola; Sibusiso Mbeje; Fumi Odede; Stephen Ojo; Mary Twala
- Music by: James William Blades; MeLo-X; Derek Dixie
- Country of origin: United States
- Original language: English

Production
- Producers: Jeremy Sullivan; Jimi Adesanya; Blitz Bazawule; Ben Cooper; Astrid Edwards; Durwin Julies; Yoli Mes; Dafe Oboro; Akin Omotoso; Will Whitney; Lauren Baker; Jason Baum; Alex Chamberlain; Robert Day; Christophe Faubert; Brien Justiniano; Rethabile Molatela Mothobi; Sylvia Zakhary; Nathan Scherrer; Erinn Williams
- Cinematography: Ryan Marie Helfant; Mohammaed Atta Ahmed; Michael Fernandez; Danny Hiele; Nicolai Niermann; Malik Sayeed; Santiago Gonzalez; David Boanuh; Erik Henriksson; Laura Merians; Kenechukwu Obiajulu; Benoit Soler
- Editors: Andrew Morrow; Maria-Celeste Garrahan; Haines Hall; Tom Watson
- Running time: 85 minutes
- Production companies: Walt Disney Pictures; Parkwood Entertainment

Original release
- Network: Disney+
- Release: July 31, 2020

Black Is King is a 2020 American musical film co-written, executive produced, and directed by Beyoncé. It is a visual companion to the 2019 album The Lion King: The Gift, curated by Beyoncé for the film The Lion King (2019).

The film tells the story of a young African prince (Folajomi Akinmurele) who is exiled from his kingdom after his father's death. As he grows into a man (Nyaniso Dzedze), he undergoes a journey of self-identity, using the guidance of his ancestor (Beyoncé), childhood love (Nandi Madida), and his own subconscious (Stephen Ojo) to reclaim his throne. The prince's journey acts as an allegory for the African diaspora's journey of discovering, reclaiming and celebrating their culture and heritage, which is echoed by the inclusion of spoken-word poetry that focuses on the question of black identity.

Black Is King was in production for over a year, across six countries on three continents. Beyoncé wanted to recruit a diverse cast and crew and to provide opportunities for new talent. The music, dances, costumes, hairstyles, and sets were designed to showcase the beauty and richness of the cultures in the African continent and diaspora. The film was released globally on Disney+ on July 31, 2020, and was aired the following day across Sub-Saharan Africa on M-Net and Canal+ Afrique and across the Middle East and North Africa on OSN. An extended version of "Black Parade" was used for the film's credits, and was included in a deluxe edition of The Gift released alongside the film.

The film received praise for Beyoncé's direction, the cinematography, score, costume design, subject matter, and cultural themes. It received six nominations at the 63rd Annual Grammy Awards, including Best Music Film. "Brown Skin Girl" won the award for Best Music Video, while "Black Parade" won the award for Best R&B Performance. It was Beyoncé's 28th Grammy win, making her the most awarded singer and female artist in Grammy history. The film also won the Primetime Emmy Award for Outstanding Costumes for a Variety, Nonfiction, or Reality Program at the 73rd Primetime Emmy Awards.

== Plot ==
On a beach in the spiritual plane, a newborn prince is held by his maternal ancestor while she tells him of his significance and purpose ("Bigger"). She performs rituals for the prince and joins other women who are also holding newborns. On the beach, the prince is anointed with white paint by the ancestor, while in a royal palace, he is similarly anointed by an elder. The king gives the young prince a small golden scepter and tells the prince that his ancestors look down on them from the stars and will always be there to guide him ("Find Your Way Back").

The young boy is enticed by a monkey to enter a warehouse. A man with a snake asks the boy who he is, but the boy does not answer. The boy stays in the warehouse, adorns himself with gold, and spends his time gambling while being watched by his ancestor and the blue man ("Don't Jealous Me"). Outside, a biker gang arrives and encircles the prince. The king comes to save him and is killed by a bike. The prince's uncle tells the prince to flee the village, and he takes over the throne ("Scar"). In the spiritual plane, the ancestor leads the king's funeral, while the blue man sits alone ("Nile").

The prince dreams of living a carefree life, driving past his ancestor and the blue man. He lives in an extravagant mansion full of expensive clothes, servants, and feasts ("Mood 4 Eva"). The prince remembers his uncle banging on a drum, causing him to drop the scepter into the water. A human chess game takes place in the mansion's ground, reminding the prince of how his father taught him the game, which represented the duality of good and evil. In real life, the prince grows up and moves to the city. He now dreams of spending his time partying with girls inside a tricked-out hearse ("Ja Ara E"). His driver appears as his uncle, who taunts him with the golden scepter. He stumbles out of the car and wakes up. The prince realizes that pursuing material wealth is unsustainable, and he is encouraged to reclaim his purpose and identity ("Already"). His ancestor tells the prince that he will meet himself at the shore, as the blue man walks into the sea ("Water"). The prince is reunited with his childhood love ("Brown Skin Girl"). The couple gets married ("Keys to the Kingdom"), but he is plagued by self-doubt over his purpose.

In another time, a sandstorm arrives ("Otherside"). As others are fleeing, the ancestor decides to place her baby in a basket and put it in the river to save the baby. As the basket flows down the river, it reaches a waterfall. In the spiritual plane, the ancestor is reunited with her baby.

The ancestor tells the prince to return to the river, in which he finds the scepter. He is reunited with the elder, who anoints him again with white paint, and he floats upwards into the spiritual plane. The prince reunites with his father and breaks down in front of him. The ancestor reminds the prince of his power, and he assembles an army of women to fight his uncle ("My Power"). They chase him out of the kingdom, and the prince reclaims his throne. The ancestor brings the new king and queen their baby ("Spirit"), and the baby is anointed.

== Cast ==
- Beyoncé as a spirit guide, maternal figure, and/or ancestor
- Folajomi Akinmurele as a young prince, inspired by Simba
- Nyaniso Ntsikelelo Dzedze as the adult prince, inspired by Simba
- Stephen Ojo as the blue man, a representation of the prince's subconscious
- Nandi Madida as the prince's love interest, inspired by Nala
- Warren Masemola as the prince’s uncle who takes over the kingdom, inspired by Scar
- Sibusiso Mbeje as the prince's father, inspired by Mufasa
- Connie Chiume as the prince's mother, inspired by Sarabi
- Mary Twala as an elder, inspired by Rafiki. The film was Twala's last role and was released after her death.
- Fumi Odede

=== Special appearances ===
- Tina Knowles
- Jay-Z
- Blue Ivy Carter
- Rumi Carter
- Sir Carter
- Kelly Rowland
- Lord Afrixana
- Yemi Alade
- Jessie Reyez
- Shatta Wale
- Salatiel
- Pharrell Williams
- Wizkid
- Naomi Campbell
- Adut Akech
- Aweng Chuol
- Lupita Nyong'o
- Tiwa Savage
- Ernestine Shepherd
- Ozie Nzeribe
- Mr Eazi
- Nija
- Tierra Whack
- Burna Boy
- Busiswa
- Moonchild Sanelly

== Themes and analysis ==
=== Black identity and black pride ===
The storyline of the prince's journey of self-discovery in Black Is King acts as an allegory for the African diaspora's journey of self-discovery, with the film acting as a clarion call to the diaspora to reclaim their identity through black pride. The story of how the prince is exiled from his homeland to an alien world acts a parallel to the story of how Africans were forcibly removed from the continent and taken to the United States as slaves. As the prince grows up, he is plagued by the question of his identity, reflecting African Americans' continued struggle with their identity. Colonialism, slavery and the oppression of black people has severed their connection to their heritage and has caused even black people themselves to think of their culture as corrupt or worthless, in the same way the prince was led to believe that he is undeserving of the role that was his birthright.

With Black Is King, Beyoncé is providing a solution for this. In the story of the film, the prince receives guidance and empowerment from his ancestors to recognize his brilliance and ultimately reclaim his throne. Similarly, with the film, Beyoncé is empowering the African diaspora to connect with their heritage, celebrate their culture and recognize their self-worth. Beyoncé said that Black Is King aims to shift "the global perception of the word 'Black'" and show that "Black is regal and rich in history, in purpose and in lineage", which is achieved in the film by showcasing a wide variety of African music styles, dances, costumes, hairstyles, settings and traditions with the help of African creatives.

Taylor Crumpton for The Ringer posited that Black Is King therefore sends a message to the African diaspora that in order for them to "disinvest from established power dynamics" and "exist outside the constraints of white supremacy", they must undertake an internal journey to discover and celebrate the rich identity and heritage that was lost to them. Candice Frederick for The Guardian added that Beyoncé showing that "Black power comes from within and is our cultural birthright [and] not something that is granted to us by someone else" is a "hard realization", as the current narrative is centered on "how a system built by other people has failed us and what we need from them to be successful".

The need for diasporic Africans struggling with their identity to gain self-awareness before confronting their oppression is echoed in an excerpt from Uncle Sam, a 2013 poem by student Joshua Abah, that was featured in Black Is King, which reads:

When it's all said and done, I don't even know my own native tongue. And if I can't speak myself, I can't think myself. And if I can't think myself, I can't be myself. And if I can't be myself, I will never know me. So Uncle Sam, tell me this: If I will never know me, how can you?

==== Afrofuturism ====
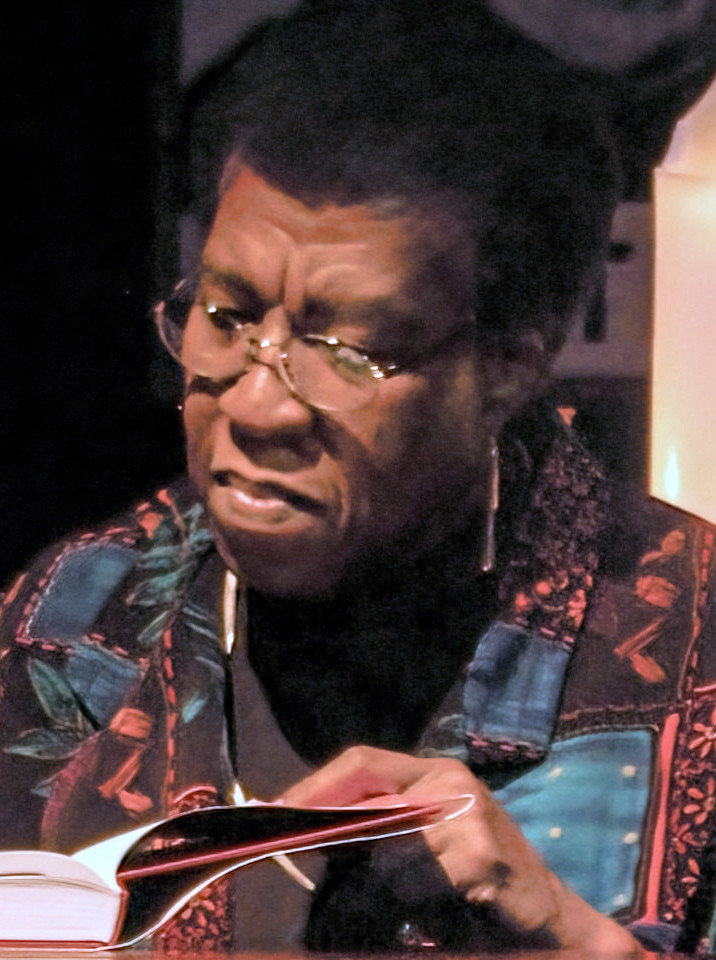
The Afrofuturist themes in Black Is King have been compared to that of Octavia Butler's writings

Kinitra Brooks, Endowed Chair in Literary Studies at Michigan State University, described Black Is King as "an aural and visual rendering of Afrofuturistic Blackness in the 21st century", referring to the philosophy and cultural aesthetic that combines science fiction, history and fantasy to encourage black people to recover their heritage in order to create their own futures. Elisabeth Woronzoff for PopMatters noted that Black Is King engages with the Afrofuturist themes of "reliance on the cosmos for explanation and influence" and "the uneasy connection between lineage and self", with the film being influenced by Octavia Butler's writings as a work that "reclaims identity regardless of whether it is earthbound or cosmic". Woronzoff also noted that the film's storyline of an outcast African king draws multiple parallels to events from throughout black people's history until today, including "African history, the Middle Passage, and the Black Lives Matter movement".

Maxine Montgomery, Professor of English at Florida State University, described the influence of Afrofuturism on the film, writing: "Afro-futurist tropes involving time travel across the cosmos, cultural clashes with the other, and encounters with newness lift [Black Is King] out of the temporal and locate the production in a timeless realm that encourages a rethinking of established time, space, and identity." Montgomery explained that Black Is King, through its references to "vernacular structures implying futurity", disrupts the orthodox "narrow critical framework" employed by cultural critics such as Mark Dery, concluding: "The unconventional temporalities that figure into [Black Is King] beckon us to abandon received ways of seeing and being seen, to cross over into an original social and psychic space."

==== Pan-Africanism ====
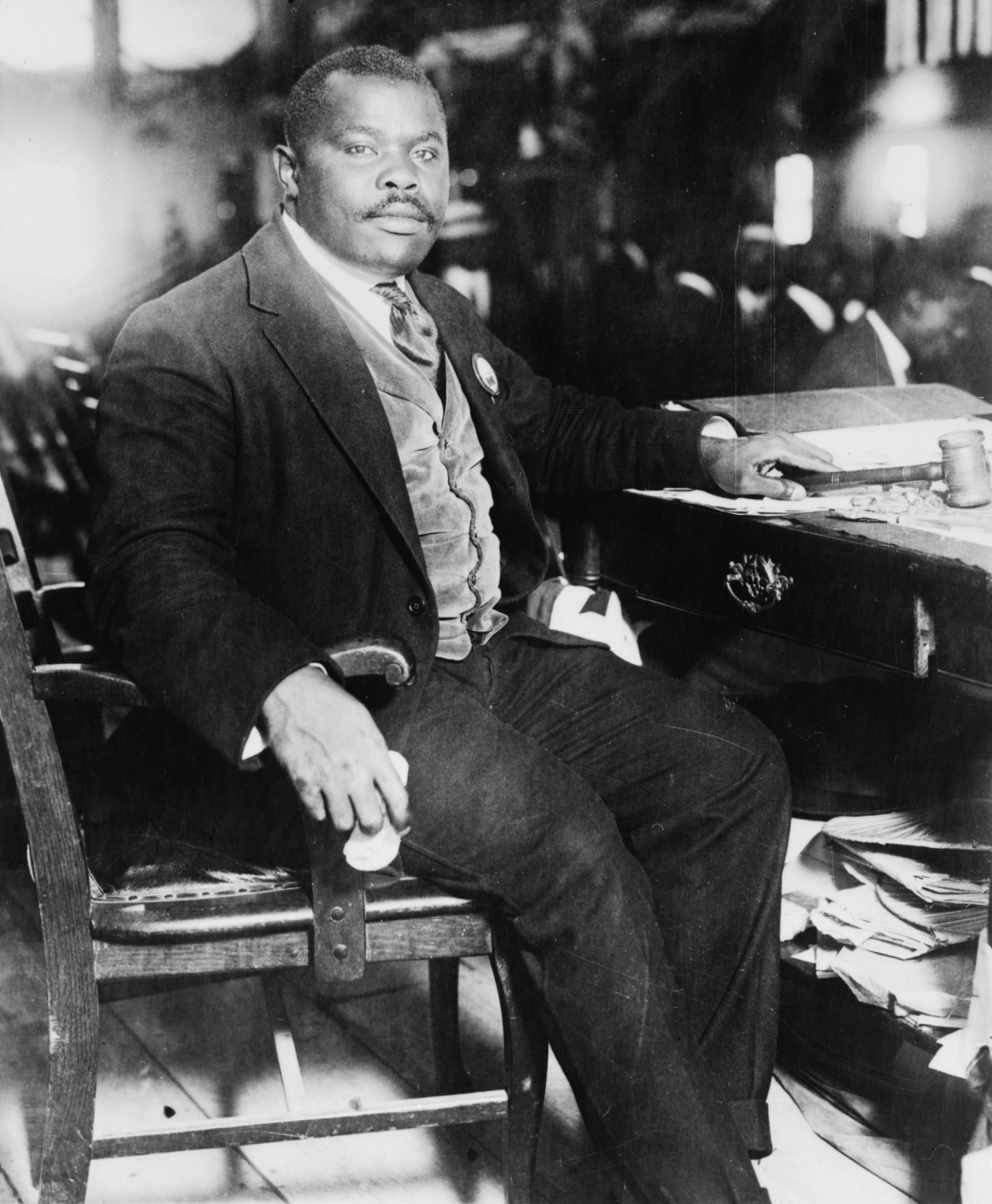
The theme of Pan-Africanism in the film was influenced by the work of Marcus Garvey

According to Rading Biko of The Standard, Black Is King "has awaken the spirit of Pan-Africanism", a movement that aims to unite black people in Africa and the diaspora. Biko wrote that Pan-African activist Marcus Garvey inspired the film, bringing his quote: "Be as proud of your race today as our fathers were in days of yore. We have beautiful history, and we shall create another in the future that will astonish the world." Garvey's Pan-African flag, a symbol of black liberation, was the inspiration for David Hammons' African-American flag, which is seen in Black Is King being held up by a group of black men. According to Brooke Obie of Esquire, this scene signifies "the political and communal unity of all Indigenous people of Africa, throughout the Diaspora". Obie concluded: "Just like the art, fashion, locations, musicians and actors who make up Black Is King and The Gift, we are stronger when we see ourselves connected in global struggle and glory."

Claire Shaffer of Rolling Stone described Black Is King as "a Pan-African collage", with the film showcasing fashion, music, dances, locations and languages from throughout the African continent and diaspora. Director Blitz Bazawule described the film as "a phenomenal opportunity to see Blackness represented with universality". Bazawule continued: "It was so many voices, all singing in a chorus in a way that I've never witnessed in my life. As a creator, it's completely changed how I look at my art, how I look at Blackness in general, and how we communicate with each other globally."

==== Subversion of stereotypes ====
The film addresses and subverts stereotypical depictions of Africans and African Americans. Powerhouse Museum senior curator Roger Leong described how "tropes of African identity – the wild animal prints, the ultra, almost Josephine Baker images of the showgirl ... she draws on all these archetypes of black glamour and uses them as statements about black pride". Costume designer Zerina Akers put the actors in designer animal print costumes, explaining how she "wanted to turn that [stereotype of Africans' primitive nature] on its head and raise it up to make it feel really high fashion". Janell Hobson of Ms. stated that the "Mood 4 Eva" video is a satirical depiction of black regality and an inversion of classic film tropes, with the presence of white male servants acting as a reversal of the roles in films such as Gone with the Wind and The Help, while Melanie McFarland for Salon wrote that a Busby Berkeley-inspired sequence in the video with black synchronized swimmers highlights how black people were excluded from Hollywood's Golden Age. Natty Bakhita Kasambala of gal-dem wrote that Beyoncé filming scenes in settings such as a country house and renaissance supper table aims to "fill historically White Spaces with an unfiltered, unapologetic Blackness", an act which she calls "an extreme disturbance of the norm in order to shake the rigid structures loose altogether".

=== Black masculinity, femininity and community ===
Co-director Kwasi Fordjour explained how throughout their lives, black men often face obstacles where they need to "decide how we want to navigate this world, the type of man we want to be". Black Is King addresses this issue by presenting a black masculinity centered on leadership, community and the honoring of ancestors. Fordjour commented how a quote from James Earl Jones in the film, which reads "As king, I was most proud of one thing, having you as my son", was intended to represent the voice of God telling black men in their plight: "You're going to be OK. You are my son. You are going to make this. We are going to be alright." Fordjour added: "As men, I feel like sometimes we walk through this world aimlessly and sometimes we just need to be embraced."

Brooke Obie, writing for Esquire, opined that Black Is King is a blueprint for black men to decolonize masculinity. Obie quoted a passage read by an African-American man in the film:

We've been conditioned to be inside of a box. We've been created with this image that Black men are supposed to be this way. And I feel like we're kings. We have to take responsibility of stepping outside of those barriers that they've put us in, for the next generation.

Obie explained how slavery and colonialism forced toxic religious and social traditions onto black men which "leads to violence against women and girls, queerphobia, and destruction of self". Black Is King therefore shows "how the world could thrive when Black men step into kingship", not one which is based on the "white supremacist ideas of hierarchy, dominance, and oppression", but instead one which embraces an "African egalitarian way" and is "rooted in stewardship to community".

Sophia Ordaz of Slate noted that as well as the message of the film being "that Black kingship amounts to responsible manhood, Black femininity is just as integral". Ordaz highlights a spoken word passage read by a man in the film, which states: "Many times, it's the women that reassemble us. Men taught me some things, but women taught me a whole lot more." Janell Hobson of Ms. wrote that the "Brown Skin Girl" video is "a reminder of how Black women's collective gaze on each other is powerful enough to challenge the male gaze", as well as "a reminder of the community and solidarity of women to build each other up and raise our daughters toward the confidence they need to navigate a white imperialist and hetero-patriarchal world". Fordjour explained that a scene where women are standing on a beach holding hollowed-out calabashes (which symbolize health, fertility and rebirth in some African cultures) acts as "a monument of mothers", highlighting "those day-to-day things that a mother has to do to constantly take care of her family and the sacrifices that she has to make to keep this world turning".

== Background ==
On July 19, 2019, The Lion King (a photorealistic animated remake of Disney's traditionally animated 1994 film of the same name) was theatrically released in the United States. The same day, an accompanying tie-in album titled The Lion King: The Gift was released by Parkwood Entertainment and Columbia Records. The Gift was curated and produced by Beyoncé, who described the album as "a love letter to Africa" and recounted her determination to find "the best talent from Africa, and not just use some of the sounds and [do] my interpretation of it".

Beyoncé explained that she believes The Gift "is the first soundtrack where it becomes visual in your mind". Beyoncé added: "I wanted to put everyone on their own journey to link the storyline. Each song was written to reflect the film's storytelling that gives the listener a chance to imagine their own imagery, while listening to a new contemporary interpretation."

On June 19, 2020, Beyoncé released the single "Black Parade", in celebration of the Juneteenth holiday which commemorates the end of slavery in the United States. Raisa Bruner of Time called the song "a tour-de-force of references: to black history, to African traditions, to her own family and past" and described Beyoncé as "the queen of a generation providing guidance and assembling her listeners with black solidarity".

== Production ==
I start with identifying my intention and making sure that I am aligned with the collaborators for the same purpose. It takes enormous patience to rock with me. My process is tedious. I review every second of footage several times and know it backwards and forwards. I find every ounce of magic and then I deconstruct it. I keep building more layers and repeat this editing process for months. I won't let up until it's undeniably reached its full potential. I believe my strength is understanding how storytelling, music, lighting, angles, fashion, art direction, history, dance, and editing work together. They are all equally important.

— Beyoncé on her creative process

Beyoncé called Black Is King "my passion project that I have been filming, researching and editing day and night for the past year". Beyoncé invested 100% of her earnings from Disney into making sure that they had the best crew and production for the film. The film's production was top secret, with the public not being aware of the film and some contributors not knowing the scope of the project until the release of the trailer.

=== Development ===
In July 2019, after the release of the music video for "Spirit", Beyoncé wanted to release more visuals for The Lion King: The Gift. At first, she intended to produce a clip for "Already", with them shooting in her backyard in The Hamptons. She then intended to shoot one-minute clips for some of the songs and make a 15-minute short film. The scope of the project then widened into creating full-length videos for each song, and her idea later snowballed into a very large production.

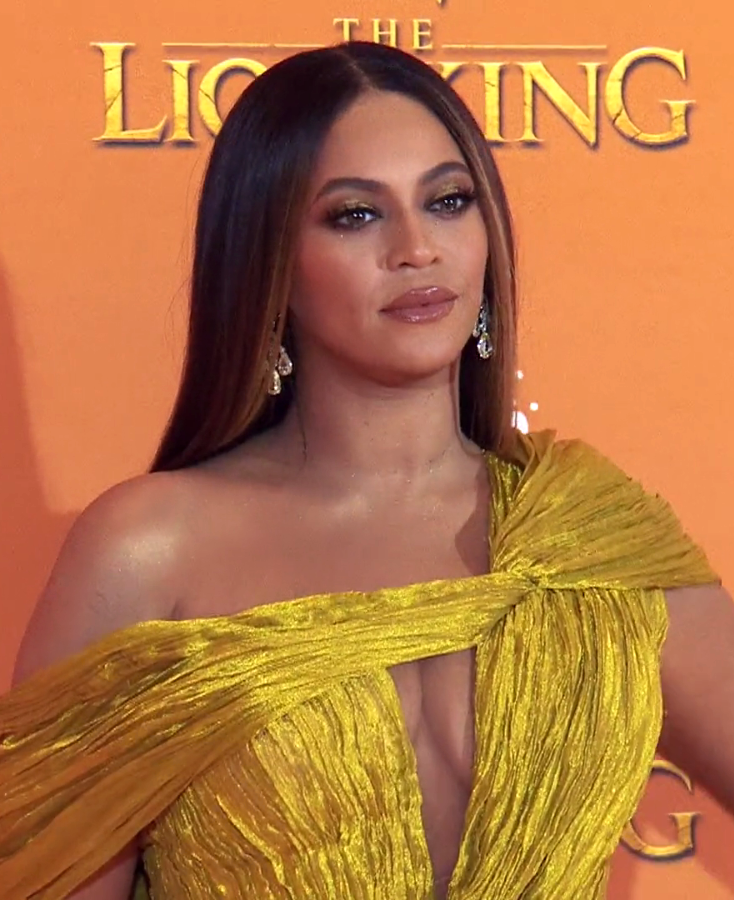
Beyoncé worked on the film for over a year after her work on The Lion King

When voicing the character of Nala in The Lion King (2019), Beyoncé delved into the history of the film and its story. She learnt about Solomon Linda, the South African composer of the song "Mbube" who received no credit or royalties from the song being used as "The Lion Sleeps Tonight" in the original The Lion King. This angered Beyoncé and she left the studio pledging to create a full-length film that would tell the real story with the help of actual Africans instead of using lions and animation, and show the regalness and beauty of Africans before colonialism and slavery erased their past. "Mbube", credited to Linda, is the only original The Lion King song included in Black Is King.

In her cover story for the December 2020 edition of British Vogue, Beyoncé explained what inspired her when developing the film, saying:

I was also deeply inspired by my trip to South Africa with my family. And, after having my son, Sir Carter, I felt it was important to uplift and praise our boys and to assure that they grow up with enough films, children's books and music that promote emotional intelligence, self-value and our rich history.

To research for the film, Beyoncé described how she "spent a lot of time exploring and absorbing the lessons of past generations and the rich history of different African customs". The trailer shows Beyoncé reading from the 1971 book Black Gods and Kings, written by American art-historian Robert Farris Thompson to record the art history of the Yoruba people of southwestern Nigeria. Beyoncé collected picture references of African cultural practices for different aspects of the production such as hair and make-up. Director Ibra Ake described Beyoncé as "a scholar" who wanted to learn about and discuss the meaning and history behind every detail that would be included in the film.

Beyoncé had a vision for the story she wanted to tell, and she brought on Blitz Bazawule to assist in writing it, who subsequently produced a storyboard with over 250 frames. Co-director Kwasi Fordjour described the excitement of the early development, saying: "Your adrenaline starts to rush and it becomes like, 'OK, what are we going to do, how are we going to do it, where do we start?' When you get into the space where you're so interested and enthralled with creating worlds and spaces, it becomes fun, and she makes it fun." Beyoncé and Fordjour recruited additional directors to direct some of the music videos in the film; Fordjour explained how they chose a diverse group of directors "who spoke to what we were trying to do" and "whose authenticity is the core of their work". Beyoncé held meetings with the additional directors to decide on the general look and feel for each section. Beyoncé then held meetings with other members of the crew, focusing on worldbuilding and logistics, as well as to discuss more detailed aspects of the production such as lighting.

The film was written by Beyoncé, poet Yrsa Daley-Ward, writer Clover Hope and Andrew Morrow. The script also incorporates poetry written by Somali-British poet Warsan Shire.

Bob Iger, Executive Chairman of The Walt Disney Company, handled talks with Beyoncé to release the film on Disney+.

=== Casting ===
The cast and crew for Black Is King were recruited to "represent diversity and connectivity", with Beyoncé wanting to feature "raw, new talent". Folajomi Akinmurele's acting debut was in the "Spirit" music video. Beyoncé was impressed by his performance and she sought him out, ultimately casting him in the lead role of young Simba. Nigerian dancer and actor Stephen Ojo was also first recruited as a dancer for the "Spirit" video. He was then brought back as a choreographer for Black Is King, teaching African dance styles and giving the meaning behind them. His role then evolved into an on-screen acting role as the "blue man". Black Is King was his debut film performance. The rest of the main cast were recruited from South Africa. Nyaniso Dzedze explained how the casting team went on a lengthy process in order to find the right person for the role of adult Simba, and "somehow my face, my image found itself on the table, and I guess the stars aligned and God said yes". Beyoncé handpicked Warren Masemola for the role of Scar, and was also adamant about casting Nandi Madida for the role of Nala.

Special guests were recruited for the film, such as Lupita Nyong'o, Naomi Campbell, Kelly Rowland, Jay-Z, and Beyoncé's children Blue Ivy, Rumi and Sir Carter, as well as some of the artists featured on The Gift, including Yemi Alade, Shatta Wale, Salatiel, Wizkid, and Busiswa. Busiswa told Teen Vogue: "I can't stop crying because I'm so proud to stand in that place for my people. To be singing in my language of Xhosa — to stand in that place for my African people, I feel so honored... We were treated with the utmost care and respect and being on that set was the most incredible experience of my whole life."

Beyoncé wanted to find black synchronized swimmers for the "Mood 4 Eva" video and only managed to find a few in the US, including Philicia and Tamar Saunders. Beyoncé and her team eventually found the Island Aquatics Synchro team in Port Antonio, Jamaica, and contacted the team's coach Olga Novokshchenova to fly the team to Los Angeles to film the scene. Women were recruited for the "My Power" video to represent multi-generational strength, including Aisha Francis (Beyoncé's former dancer who was eight months pregnant at the time) and Ernestine Shepherd (the world's oldest competitive female bodybuilder at 84 years old). Shepherd described it as "a wonderful, wonderful experience" that she felt "so honored" to be part of. She explained how Beyoncé made her "feel like a queen" and thanked her with a warm hug at the end of the shoot, after which Shepherd "went to the ladies room and shed a few tears". Members of the Accra-based dance school Dance With Purpose (DWP) Academy were recruited for the "Already" video. In 2019, the DWP Academy posted their own choreography for the song after it was first released. This caught the attention of Beyoncé and her team reached out to them to invite them to feature in the film.

For the "Brown Skin Girl" video specifically, Beyoncé explained that it was important for her to represent "all different shades of brown". Director Jenn Nkiru picked South Asian model Sheerah Ravindren to be featured in the video, who said that it was "such a blessing to be in this beautiful art piece that shows the beauty and power of Blackness" and adding that Beyoncé has "already done so much MORE for representation and empowerment for South Africans than the South African film industries". Nkiru also asked Selma Nicholls, founder of casting agency Looks Like Me, to cast children for the video. Nicholls called it "a dream come true, not just for me, not just for those children that were selected, but for all black children". Nicholls' own daughter was chosen for the film; Nicholls explained that "it's made my daughter be part of something where five years from when she wanted to look like Elsa and Anna, is singing along to the song "Brown Skin Girl"".

=== Costume design ===
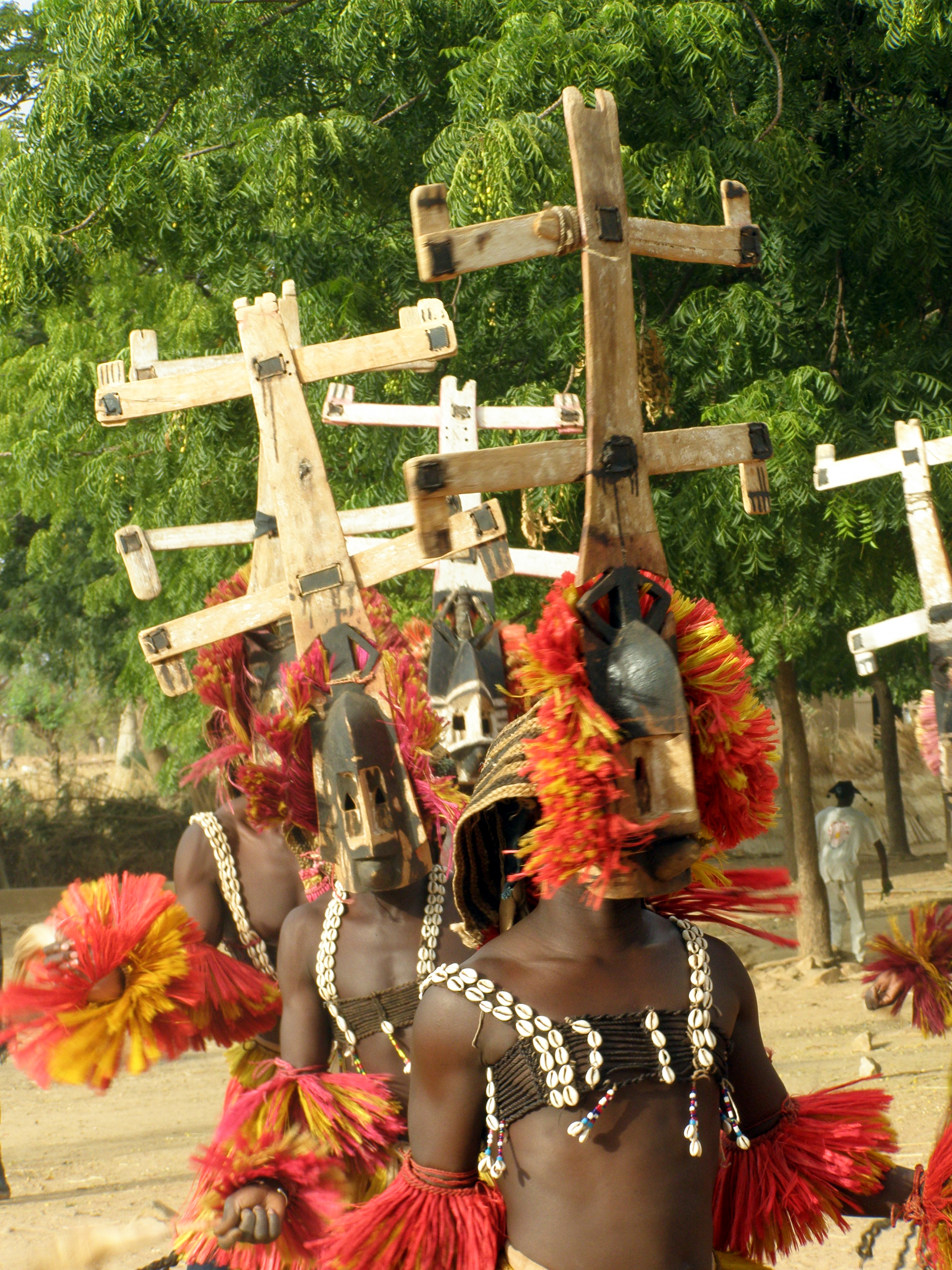
The costumes in "Find Your Way Back" allude to the Dogon people, who wear Kanaga masks during dama, a ceremony of mourning

Hundreds of costumes were designed for Black Is King, including 69 for Beyoncé herself. Costume designer Zerina Akers described how the aim of the wardrobe was to have a "global conversation"; the costumes would enable people of all races to "recognise and respect the power and beauty of brown skin", while black people would be inspired "to research their spiritual heritage and what truly belongs to them" and be left with the sense "that the world does belong to them and that they belong in the world". Akers curated outfits from both global brands and young black designers for the film, saying: "To be able to give [an emerging talent] the same visibility as a large corporation is invaluable... It's not just about creating a look, it's about how many families can benefit from that look. To see the waves this has created has been a dream." Beyoncé commented that "it was important that we worked with African designers" and that the fashion "amplified key themes in the film, such as black opulence and excellence" and "displayed a range of culture and heritage". Beyoncé added that the costume design utilized color and symbolism in order to "transition from one emotion to another".

Akers worked on the wardrobe for approximately three months. She started by going into fabric stores, swatching pieces that spoke to her as she listened to the music of The Gift. She started to create custom looks with local designers, while her counterpart Rogelio F. Burgos, started to collect runway looks. As the project grew, she hired a team of seven people to work on the film. The process became a "travelling circus", according to Akers; a constant stream of packages were arriving to set, including some straight off the runway, and they were constantly making new costumes and calling designers at midnight with ideas.

Akers spoke about how she "wanted to reference different cultures, traditions and tribes, but to have the freedom to create fantasy, for people to be able to escape into a new world". This included dancers wearing Kanaga masks in the "Find Your Way Back" video, with the sparkly looks being inspired by constellations; this is a reference to the Dogon people's astrological belief system and advanced astronomical expertise. The fashion in the "My Power" video was designed according to the colors of the Seven African Powers, with each singer representing a different orisha. Actors in the film were dressed with headpieces and belts made from cowrie shells, an allusion to when the shells were treated as currency in Africa. One look in the "Already" video was a 5:31 Jérôme blue Nigerian lace trench dress with an accompanying Nigerian gele, inspired by the fashion of matriarchal women at Nigerian weddings. A Burberry cowprint top and skirt from the "Already" video were inspired by the Xhosa and Zulu people of South Africa, who use the hide of Nguni cattle in their shields. Akers collaborated with American fashion designer Natalia Fedner on a gold chain headpiece covered in gold earrings of various styles and sizes for "Already", representing how gold jewelry connects generations of black women and the African diaspora. In one scene, Beyoncé wears chokers fused together as a reference to Ndebele neck rings. The outfits of Beyoncé and an entourage of women in the "Mood 4 Eva" sequence was an allusion to the Dahomey Amazons, an all-female military regiment from the Kingdom of Dahomey in present-day Benin.

=== Hairstyling ===
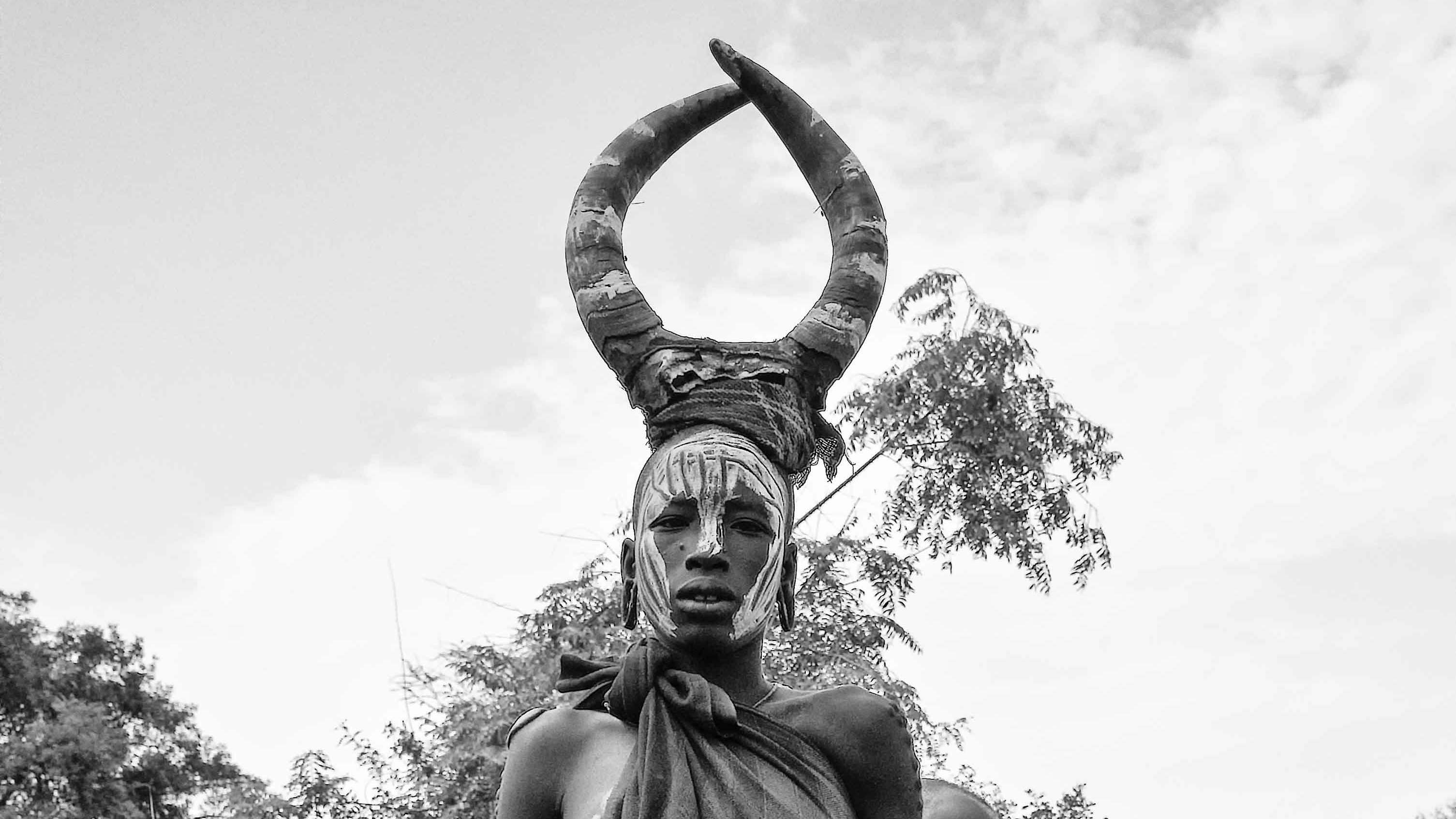
The Mursi people's use of horns (top) inspired a hairstyle in the "Already" video (bottom)

Hairstylist Neal Farinah recalled Beyoncé saying to him one Tuesday night: "Hey, I want to talk to you. I've been saving this baby for a moment now, and I want to do it." After asking her what the project is, Beyoncé replied: "I want to do a movie and I want you to do this masterpiece with me." She showed him pages of picture references of traditional African hairstyles that she had spent time collecting, and they remained there until almost 4 am discussing the hairstyles. Beyoncé wanted the hair completed by Friday, so Farinah asked his manager to look on social media for the best black hairstylists and send them to his salon in the morning. Farinah continued to research about different hairstyles and cultures, and the team spent over 16 hours a day for 6 days to create more than 40 wigs.

Farinah stated that the aim of the hairstyling was to "educate people about Blackness and Black hair, Black trends, how amazing it is and the story behind it, the history behind these cultures", as "Black women's hair and Black trends have been put down for so many years" and these styles were "not just hair" but had deep meanings behind them. Farinah added that Black Is King was a great moment to "share the piece of the pie with other Black hairstylists who don't have this platform to show their creativity and their work".

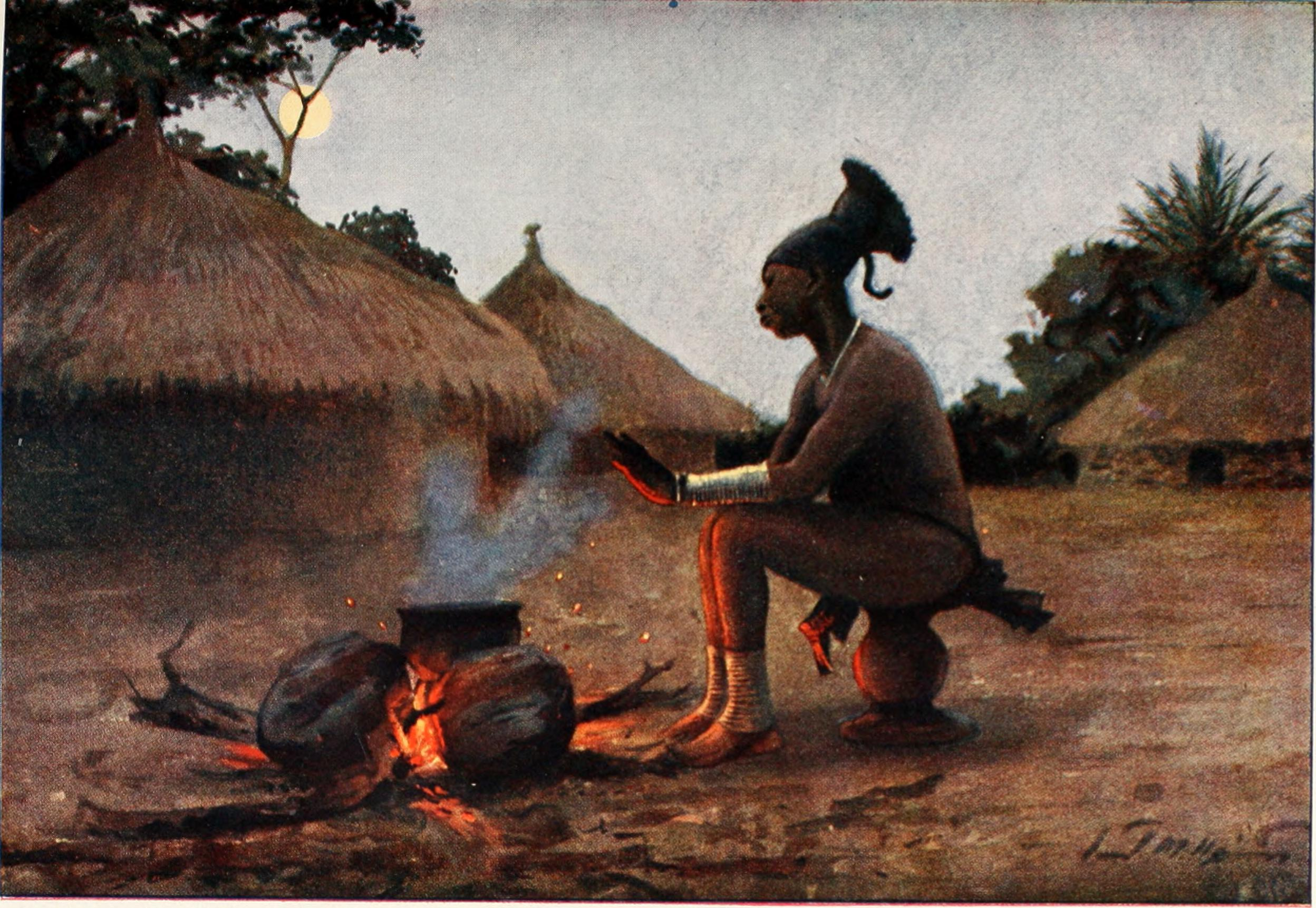
The Mangbetu people's skull elongation (top) inspired a hairstyle in the "Brown Skin Girl" video (bottom)

The hairstyles in Black Is King were inspired by various traditional African hairstyles, with Farinah and Beyoncé striving to offer insight into African culture with every style. One of Beyoncé's hairstyles in "Already" was inspired by the horned heads and lip plates of the Dinka and Mursi peoples, who wear them as symbols of prestige and honour. Another of the hairstyles in the same video used Bantu knots to pay respect to the Zulu people, with an ankh symbol in the center to symbolize life as in ancient Egyptian culture. Beyoncé's braid crown in "Brown Skin Girl" was inspired by the Mangbetu people of the Eastern Congo, whose Lipombo skull elongation technique represented royalty and status. In the same video, another hairstyle known as Orisha Bunmi can be seen, which is a Nigerian style worn for special events. One scene shows women covering their hair in red clay, which is a reference to the Himba people of Namibia and Angola. A 30-foot braided wig that can be seen in "Water" was inspired by the women of Chad. Beyoncé conceived the idea for the wig, and hairstylist Kim Kimble worked with six braiders for three days to make it.

=== Choreography ===
There were 11 choreographers who worked on Black Is King. Stephen Ojo and Caleb Bonney of dance group AVO (Africa's Very Own) Boyz were unexpectedly contacted by choreographer JaQuel Knight and asked to fly out to Los Angeles the following day. They showed Knight choreography to "Already" that they had made a few days prior for a class they were teaching. They then taught Beyoncé the choreography, as well as several other dances from throughout Africa, such as the Gbese, Poco and Kpakujemu from Nigeria, the C'est Moi from Ivory Coast, and the network from Ghana. Ojo said that his aim for the choreography "was to make sure the moves we were bringing out were properly represented and danced in the right way. I wanted to make sure Africa was being represented properly and not diluted." Ojo commented on his experience working with Beyoncé, saying: "She was a very good student. Paying homage to the originators, paying respect to our culture—some people might not care. But she was very receptive. She was being respectful the whole time, listening. And every move was clean, sharp, crisp." Lauren Michele Jackson of The New Yorker noted the wide array of African dance styles in Black Is King, writing that the film is a tribute to "the manifold ways in which a body can move: legwork, footwork, shaku shaku, zanku, twerk, wine, gbese, thrust, grind, shake".

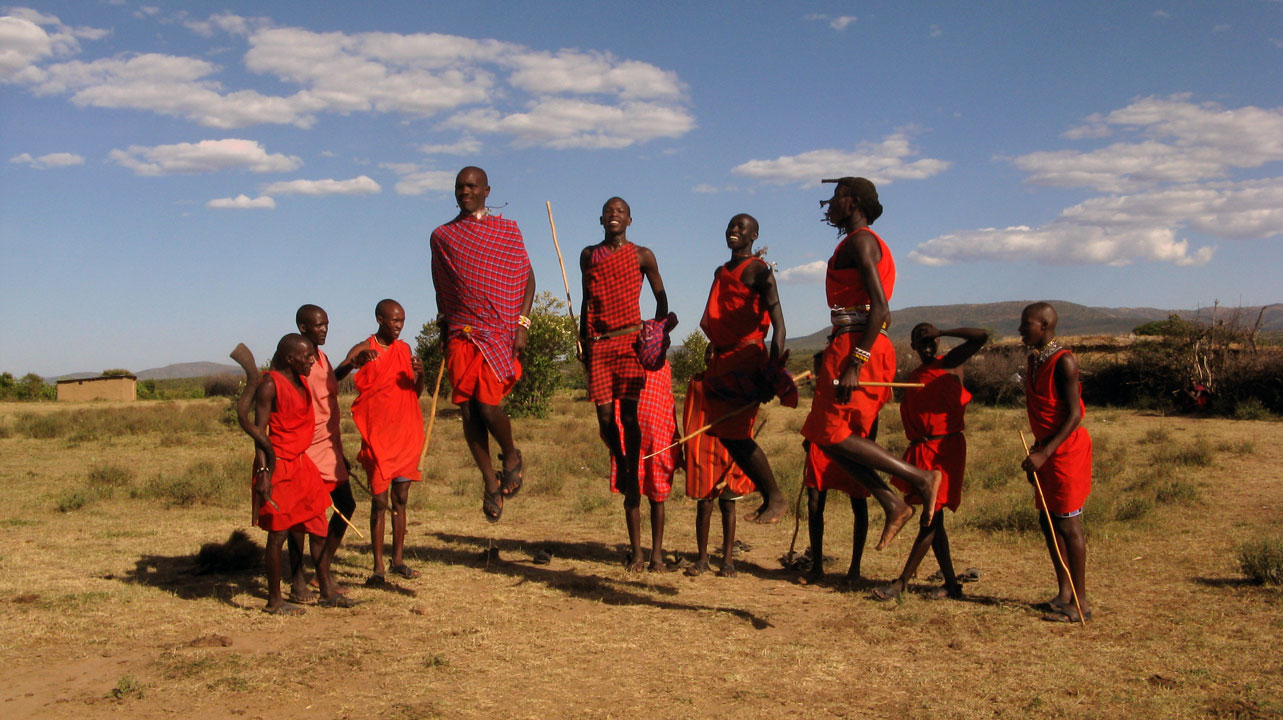
The adumu jumping dance of the Maasai people inspired choreography in the film

For the "Mood 4 Eva" video, Beyoncé and Knight had a vision of a Busby Berkeley-inspired synchronized swimming routine, with swimmers creating formations such as a dolphin chain circle through which Beyoncé would swim. Knight worked with Mary Jeanette Ramsey, executive director of Aqualillies, to choreograph the routine. French-Sudanese choreographer Kany Diabaté and American choreographer Ebony Williams choreographed the "My Power" video; Diabaté commented on her work on the film: "When you realize your wildest dream and tell the world you just CHOREOGRAPHED the biggest artist in this planet earth and the woman you been inspired for SO MANY YEARS!!!" A scene where black men in suits jumping up and down in unison is a reference to the adumu Maasai jumping dance of Kenya and Tanzania, a ceremony in which men in a circle compete for who can jump the highest with a straight posture.

=== Set design ===
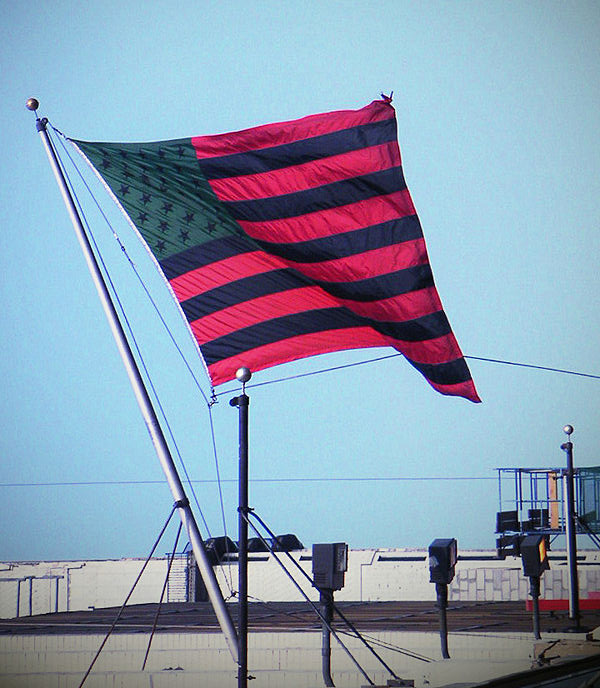
David Hammons' 1990 piece African-American Flag was added to the set of "Already"

Various pieces of art were added to the sets in Black Is King. For the "Mood 4 Eva" sequence, Beyoncé borrowed some of her mother Tina Knowles-Lawson's art pieces. The mansion used for the video featured a painting by Derrick Adams on the walls, along with sculptures by Woodrow Nash, whose work fuses Benin art with Art Nouveau. Additionally, the main piece featured throughout the sequence is Sagrada Familia by Irina Goldenfish, prominently appearing in various scenes.

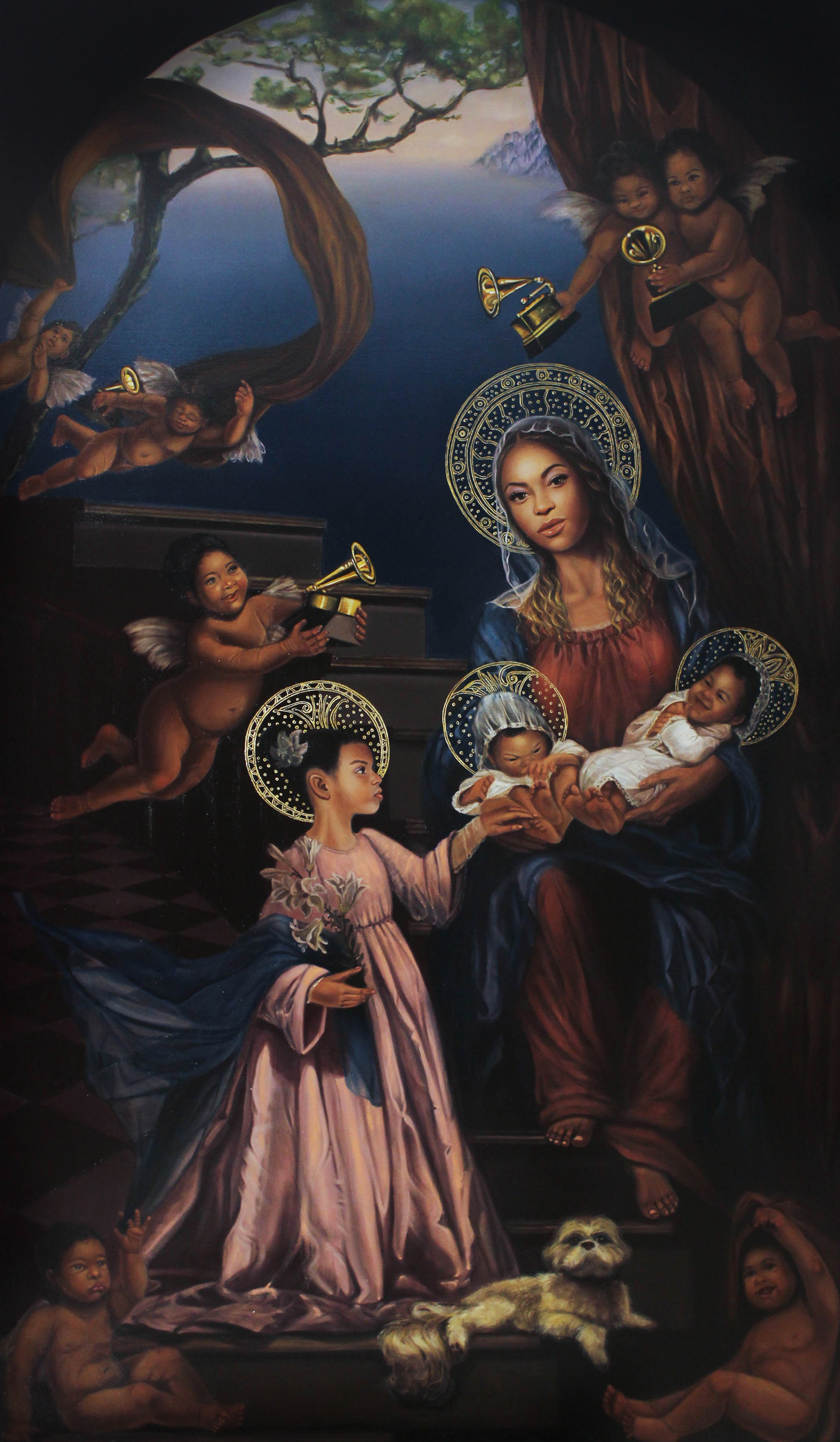
Sagrada Familia by Irina Goldenfish was featured in "Mood 4 Eva" Sequence

Ugo Rondinone's sun sculptures, symbolizing rebirth and renewal, were also prominently featured in the "Already" video to reflect the film's motif of the 'circle of life'. The circle motif is also reflected by the inclusion of Lee Broom's Hanging Hoop Chair. African-American Flag was featured in the film; the piece was created by David Hammons in 1990 to represent the marginalization of African-American artists and is seen as a symbol of black liberation. A wall of recycled containers was used in the "Water" video as a reference to Ghanaian installation artist Serge Attukwei Clottey and environmentalism.

Statues that were on the "Keys to the Kingdom" set, including one of a black woman with a child wrapped on her back, were intended to inspire young black children, with director Ibra Ake saying: "Just seeing that as a black man, coming from America, I'm like, yeah this is opposite of what I have to inspire me growing up. You just don't get to see representation like that or black people honored in that way." Director Jenn Nkiru explained how on the set of the "Brown Skin Girl" video, there was "a huge presence of life", specifically a lot of flowers and plants, representing the themes of growth and nurturing. The "Ja Are E" set consisted of a hearse converted into a party vehicle with neon lights, symbolizing the prince's "reckless effervescence", according to director Blitz Bazawule.

Hannah Beachler painted the set of "My Power" white to symbolize turning mourning into celebration, and featured an adinkra symbol that symbolizes power and unity between the women

The church featured in the "Nile" and "My Power" videos was painted fully in white by a team of over 100 people working for 38 hours straight, to reflect the use of white as a symbol of mourning in certain cultures. According to production designer Hannah Beachler, the solemn nature of the funeral in "Nile" and the celebratory nature of "My Power" not only reflects the protagonist's journey, but also symbolizes Black Is King's message of "mourning what we were in order to celebrate what we are". The Bese Saka adinkra symbol was placed on the floor of the church to signify power, abundance and unity. 8-foot tall, 10-foot wide and 3-foot deep arches covered in a black-and-white print were added to the set. The arches were inspired by Alejandro Jodorowsky's 1973 film The Holy Mountain, bringing "the piece into an abstract and modern space". According to director of photography Santiago Gonzalez, the set represented "a temple dedicated to the power of femininity, sisterhood and motherhood".

=== Filming ===
Principal photography for Black Is King took place in the latter half of 2019 for four to six months. The filming was carried out across six countries on three continents, with Beyoncé wanting to include both the African continent and diaspora. Beyoncé described the filming as "absolutely an adventure", stating: "I performed in the belly of sand dunes and I floated in the middle of the ocean. I landed on mountains to swim in waterfalls."

==== Africa ====
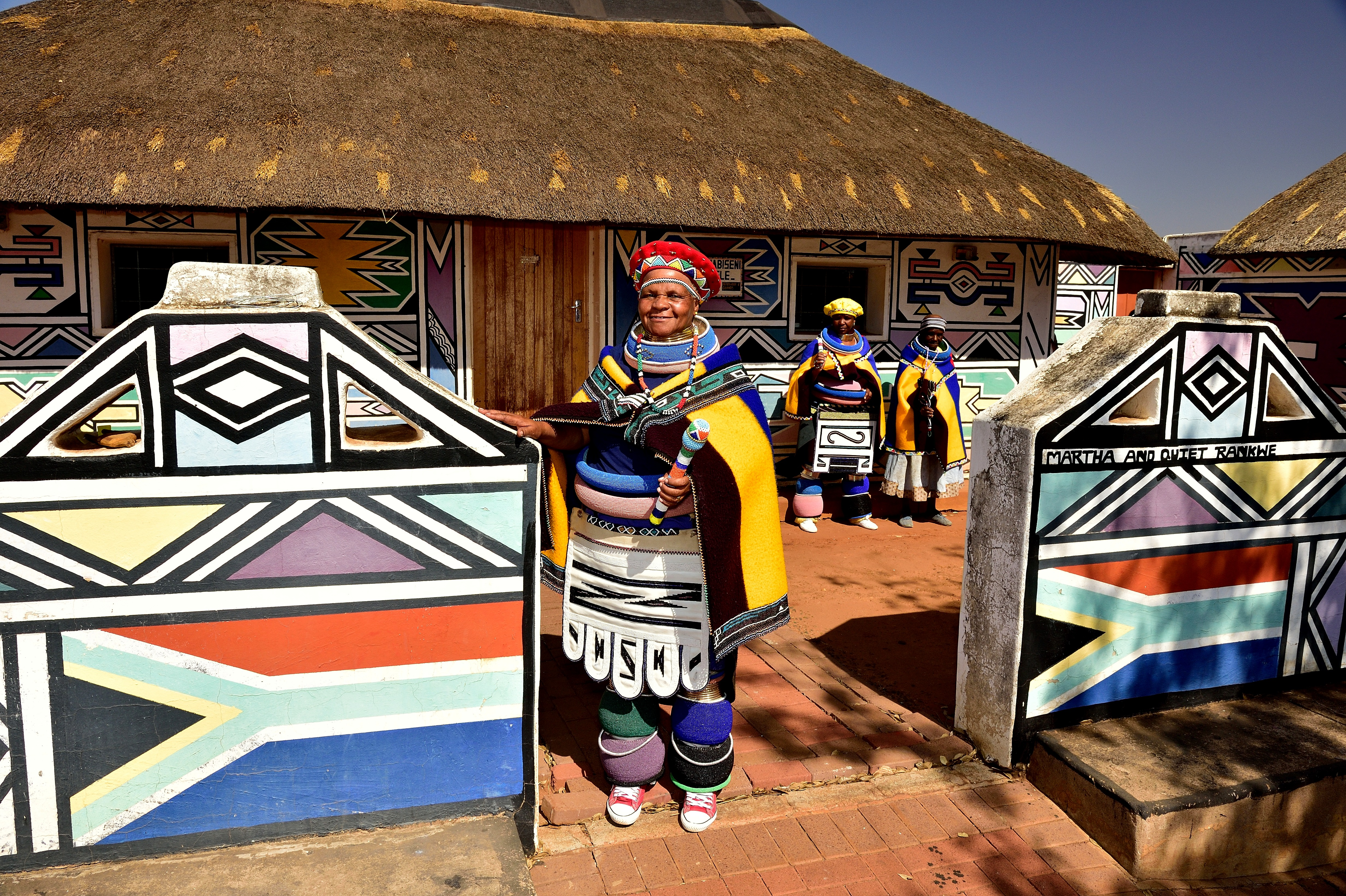
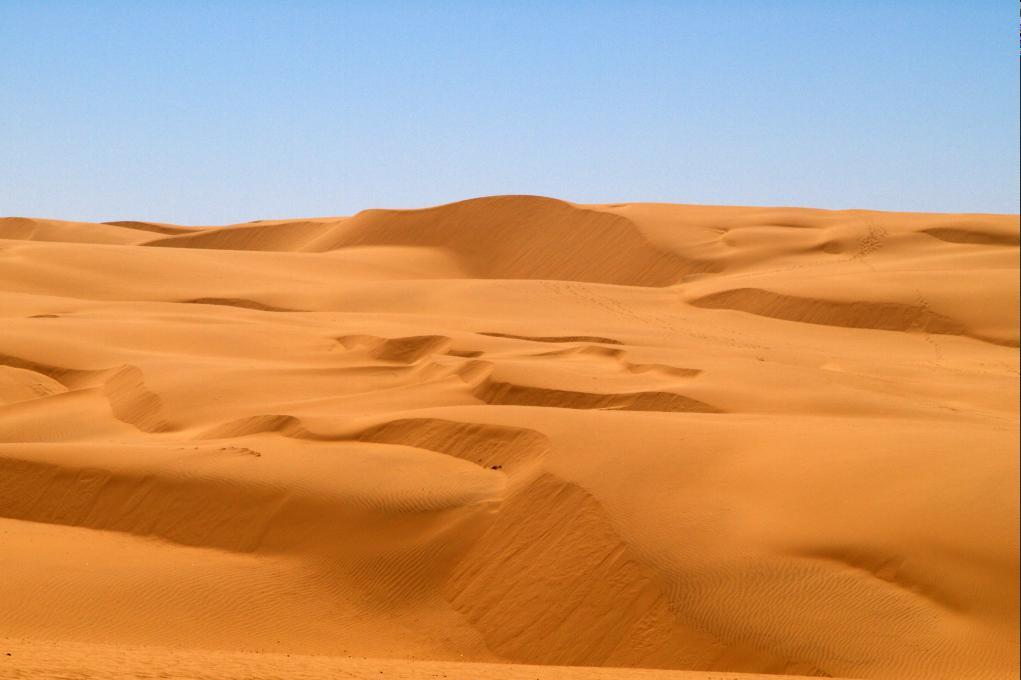
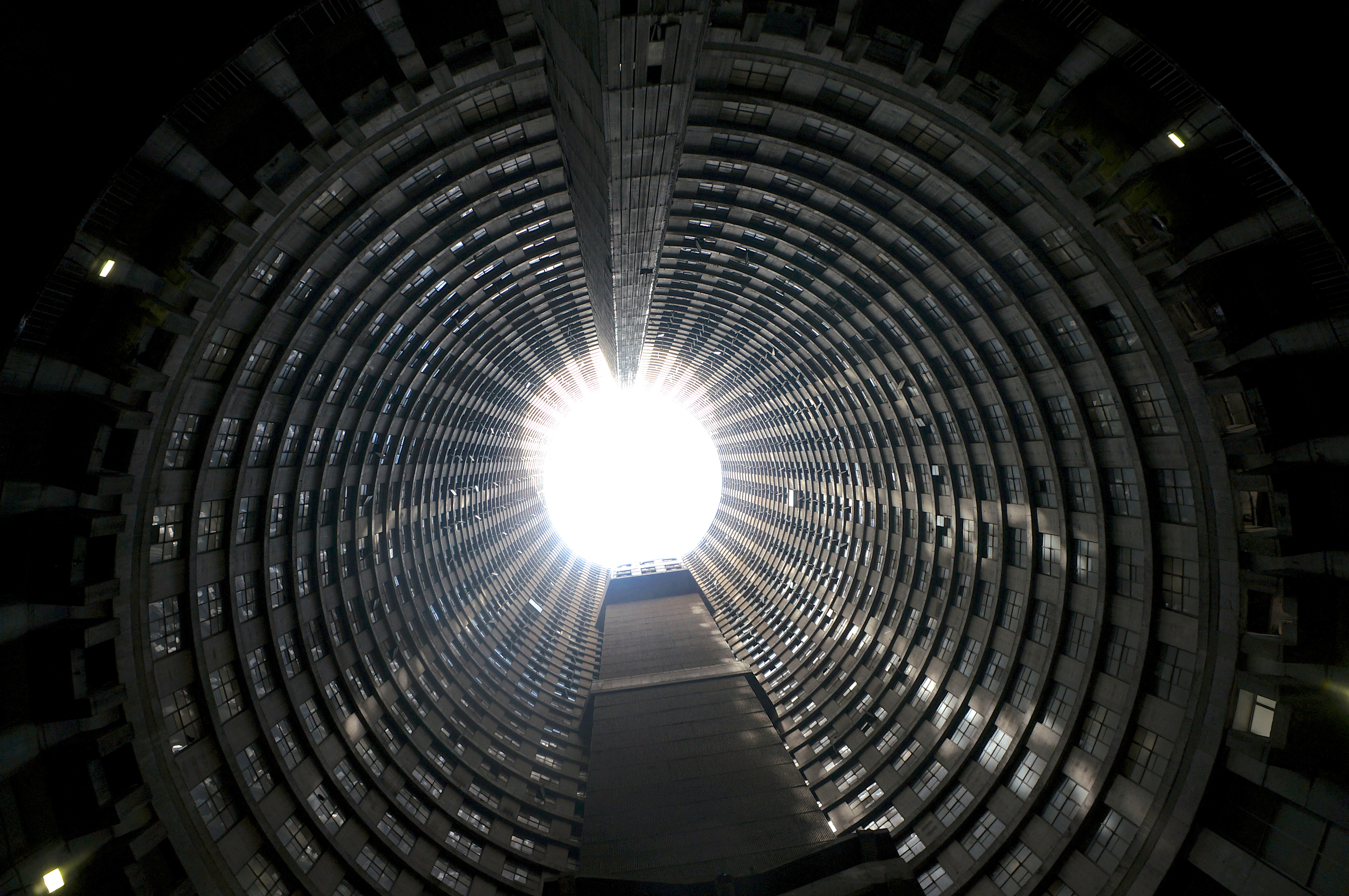
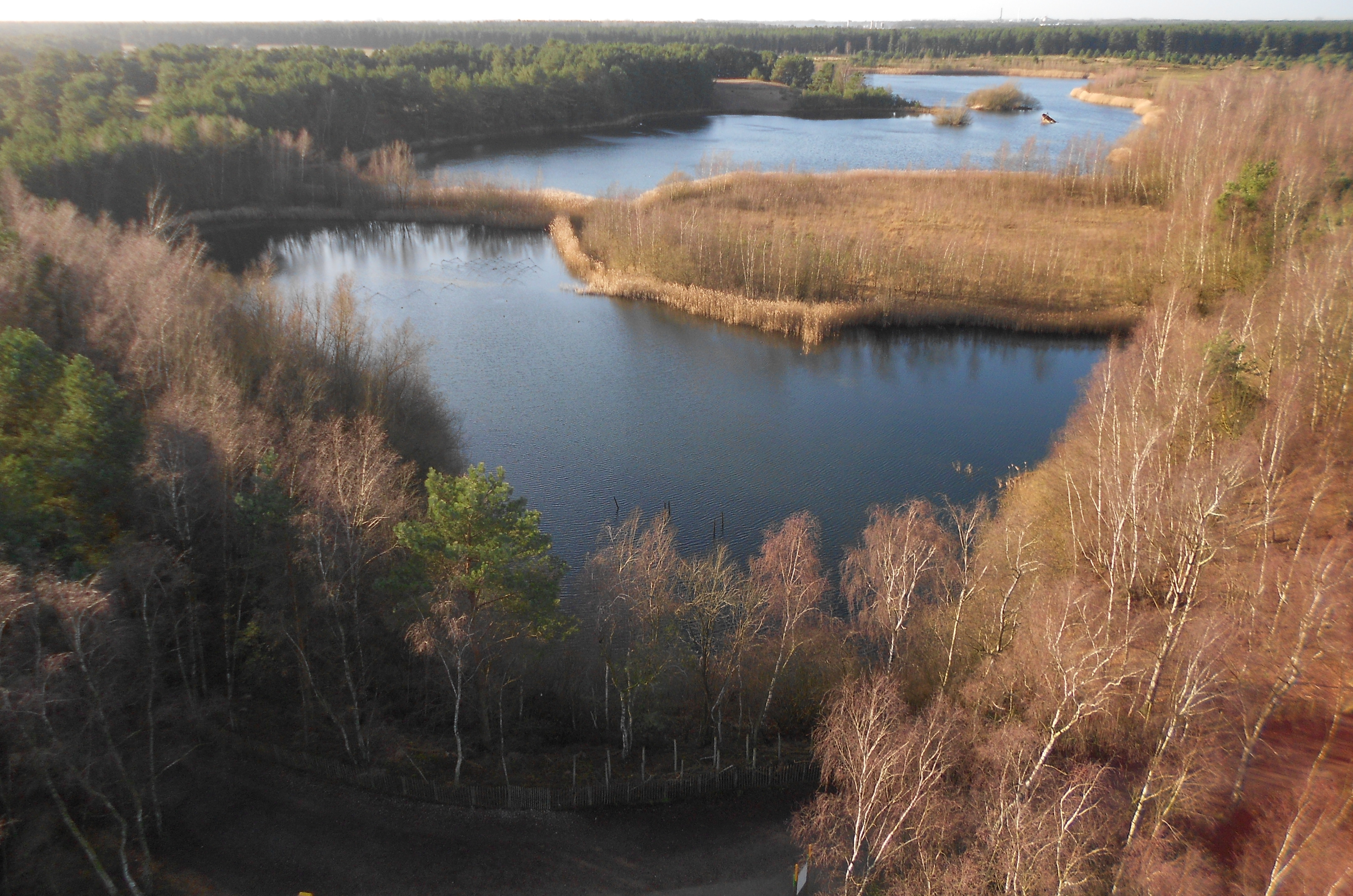
Filming locations included, clockwise from top left, the Ndebele Village of Mapoch in Mpumalanga, the Guadalupe-Nipomo Dunes in California, the Lommel Sahara in Limburg, and Ponte City in Johannesburg

The Nigerian chapter was led by director Ibra Ake, with Dafe Obro and Meji Alabi as co-directors. Filming for the "Keys to the Kingdom" video took place at the National Arts Theatre in Lagos, as Ake wanted to show a vision of Africa that isn't fantastical, but is grounded in a real location yet still amazing and impressive. In South Africa, the Shakaland Zulu Village in KwaZulu-Natal and the Ndebele church in Mapoch were the sets for the royal family's village and the wedding scene, respectively. Ponte City Apartments in Johannesburg was chosen as the location for the king's ascension to heaven, as the building used to be a bastion of apartheid in South Africa, and so the film upends that symbol and shows the prince floating out of it.

The Ghanaian chapter was led by director Joshua Kissi. Filming took place in the Eastern Region and Greater Accra Region, with the team wanting to include locations that were underrepresented in depictions of Ghana, such as Shatta Wale's hometown of Nima. Producer Sharifah Issaka noted that Beyoncé used local Ghanaian talent for the production and paid them well, unlike most foreign crews when filming in Ghana, making Black Is King "a model for other brands that might be interested in creating content or engaging with the continent" to encourage them to provide opportunities to local talent. Issaka also noted that Black Is King is "a testament to the talent and capability of Black artists— who when given the chance, can create phenomenal work. I think Beyoncé understands that these people are here. People take inspiration from Africa all the time, but hiring people and providing local people on the ground with opportunities is a whole other thing. Inspiration is not going to fill my bank account, show me the money."

==== United States ====
In New York, filming took place in the former plantation Sylvester Manor, the art gallery Guild Hall of East Hampton and Pier59 Studios. Filming also took place in Apple Valley in California and Havasu Falls in the Grand Canyon; Black Is King was the first production to be filmed at Havasu Falls, with the Havasupai people granting special permission to Beyoncé. Emmanuel Adjei and Beyoncé were the directors of the "Don't Jealous Me" and "Otherside" sections.

"Bigger" and "Find Your Way Back" were directed by Beyoncé alone, and were filmed in Arroyo Burro Beach and Guadalupe-Nipomo Dunes, California. Director of photography Santiago Gonzalez at first planned to film "Find Your Way Back" entirely on drones, however Beyoncé's team arrived to set with an Arri Alexa Mini package, which Gonzalez then used to shoot with in between drone setups. The crew scouted locations of sand dunes for a full day to look for interesting shapes in the landscape, such as deep valleys or high ridges that would play well with the drone. Some scenes in the video were filmed in a light setting, such as the sand dunes, and others were filmed in a dark setting, such as a comet landing and Beyoncé laying down on a bed of stars; these two types of scenes were intended to represent a journey and a duality. The sequins and crystals in the fashion were lit so that they could sparkle and glimmer to resemble stars. One scene was framed with a profile of Beyoncé and her dancers behind her to pay homage to the cover art of Miles Davis' Bitches Brew.

The "Mood 4 Eva" segment was filmed in the Beverly House over two days in September 2019, with Beyoncé and Dikayl Rimmasch as directors. There were 20 large setups around the mansion and the film crew totaled around 40 people in grip, electric and camera. The concept for the segment was to show the characters living a carefree lifestyle with a dreamscape reminiscent of old Hollywood. In order to give the video a vintage look, director of photography Santiago Gonzalez employed Kowa Cine Prominar lenses – spherical lenses built in the 1960s – providing a warmer flare, good contrast and a saturation that imparts brightness and opulence. Gonzalez also used a diffusion filter to bloom the highlights and make the images slightly softer, and made the window light bloom so that they conveyed a dream-like quality to the video. Other scenes in the segment were inspired by Eddie Murphy's Coming to America and Hype Williams' Belly. The old Hollywood dreamscape culminated in a Busby Berkeley-style aqua-musical fantasy with a synchronized swimming routine inspired by the 1944 Esther Williams film Bathing Beauty. The swimmers recalled seeing different aspects of Beyoncé on set, one being "Beyoncé the businesswoman, fearless in bringing her vision to life" who "never hesitated getting wet, literally, as many times as needed to get the perfect shot", and the other being "Beyoncé the mother, taking time to include her family in the entire process" and "frequently checking in with the younger girls to make sure they remained comfortable in the cool water". Nicole Chin Sue, one of the synchronised swimmers in the video, recalled:

[Beyoncé] actually came and personally greeted the Jamaican girls. She told them she wants them to continue, that they are going to inspire the world, and that all the young girls like Blue are going to see this and want to do it. She was such a boss, directing, overlooking everything, and so sweet and warm. It was an amazing shoot. That was probably the biggest moment of my career as a performer, as a synchronized swimmer, and as a Jamaican.

The "Nile" and "My Power" videos were filmed in November 2019 at the Cathedral of Saint Vibiana in Los Angeles, with Beyoncé as director. Co-director Julian Klincewicz operated a 1980s Ikegani Tsushinki broadcast camera. Director of photography Santiago Gonzalez employed Arri Ultra-Wide 8mm Prime lenses and used low sweeping angles for the "My Power" video to make the columns on set feel "huge" and "alive" and to add speed to the camera movement, amplifying the dynamism of the choreography. Beyoncé specified that she did not want to be the point of focus for any shots that included the other artists featured in the video, and instead asked to be on the edge of the frame or integrated into a group. Gonzalez consequently kept the lighting bright with less of a key light, highlighting the women's natural beauty.

==== Europe ====
The "Brown Skin Girl" segment was mainly filmed in London, as well as in Nigeria and Los Angeles. Director Jenn Nkiru chose to primarily feature South London, including her hometown of Peckham, due to its large black and South Asian communities. The video for "Scar" was directed by Pierre Debusschere and filmed on December 15, 2019, in the Sahara nature reserve in Lommel, Belgium. Debusschere recalled sometimes working 23 hours a day on the film, with the "Scar" scene being filmed at 5 am and −2 °C weather. Debusschere described how he had to try keep up with Beyoncé and praised her as "a powerful, inspiring woman" who excels in her various roles, saying: "It's in the way she understands sets,... but also in the way she picks up the choreography and switches between the business side and the artistic side. It's her company, her thing, her money, and her vision that make this project."

=== Post-production ===
Post-production took place from December 2019 with Emmanuel Adjei supervising the visual-effects. Multiple versions of scenes were shot, and Beyoncé held discussions with the other directors on the strengths of each shot and to decide which edit worked best. At the beginning of the COVID-19 pandemic, a full re-edit of the film was carried out in order to make the story as poignant as possible. The editing process was challenging, as multiple post-production companies were working on the film all remotely. Fordjour noted how the George Floyd protests began as the film was in post-production, describing it as "divine intervention" and adding: "Being able to do something that was a love letter to fellow women and men, and our culture, in a time when we need a pick-me-up, that is something that I will never forget."

Beyoncé and Derek Dixie acted as music directors, while MeLo-X, Derek Dixie, and James William Blades contributed to the score; MeLo-X described working on the film on Twitter, writing: "Truly an amazing and eye opening journey. @Beyonce always pushes for greatness. This is nothing less".

== Music ==
Black Is King is based on the music of The Lion King: The Gift, with each song on the album receiving corresponding visuals in the film. An extended version of "Black Parade" was used for the film's credits.

The film's score was composed by James William Blades, MeLo-X, and Derek Dixie, while Beyoncé and Derek Dixie acted as music directors. The score contains traditional African music from the UNESCO Collection of Traditional Music and released by Smithsonian Folkways. Ethnomusicologist and retired Smithsonian Folkways associated director Atesh Sonneborn commented that the choice of songs used were notably lullabies and children's songs, with the selection showing that Beyoncé was trying "to reach back to her own sense of African heritage". Sam Adams of Slate wrote that the inclusion of this selection of recordings in Black Is King "underline the way in which tradition is passed down through music" as well as "how that transmission can be exploited by outside parties for profit". Jon Pareles of The New York Times wrote that the use of the traditional African recordings as transitions in the film reinforces the theme of "the continuity of old and new".

In Black Is King, Beyoncé included Solomon Linda's 1939 song "Mbube," which was adapted as "The Lion Sleeps Tonight" in the original The Lion King. Linda received no credit for his song's inclusion in the film, and neither he nor his descendants were financially compensated. Brooke Obie of Esquire noted that the inclusion of the original recording where the adaptation would have been in The Lion King "amends the record" and "underscores and connects the global, centuries-long European extraction, exploitation and appropriation of our many cultures and people throughout the African Diaspora". Zinhle Ngema of OkayAfrica added that the original song's inclusion in the film ensures that Linda's "family received the monetary gain they have fought for so long".

== Marketing ==
On the night of June 27, 2020, a teaser trailer for Black Is King was posted on Beyoncé's website, the first official announcement of the film to the public. The teaser was then premiered on television a day later on June 28, to conclude the BET Awards after Beyoncé's acceptance speech for the BET Humanitarian Award. It was then subsequently released across various platforms by Beyoncé's entertainment and management company Parkwood Entertainment in association with Disney. Bob Iger, Executive Chairman of The Walt Disney Company, said he was "honored to be working with Beyoncé [on] this" upon sharing the teaser on Twitter. The surprise release of the teaser caused "Twitter [to go] bonkers", according to USA Today, and it subsequently received praise from fans and critics alike for its imagery and symbolism.

An official trailer for Black Is King was released by Beyoncé on July 19, 2020. Some of the members of the cast and crew were subsequently announced. The trailer was similarly praised by critics, with Jasmine Ting for Paper declaring the film "[a] colorful cinematic masterpiece" with "out-of-this-world visuals" that mix "traditional cultural elements from the African continent" with "modern-day African-American culture".

For the film's release, Twitter implemented a new feature that showed an animated symbol of two golden lions featured in The Gift's album cover and in Black Is King (instead of the usual heart symbol) whenever a user liked a tweet containing the hashtag #BlackIsKing. A Twitter spokesperson said: "Because we know that some of the best moments deserve a little spark and delight, we are testing a product that lets partners customize Twitter's Like button animation with iconic imagery that complements their campaign." The feature was well received by Twitter users and has led to several other brands implementing similar features, including Apple, NASA and the NBA. Olivia Harrison of Refinery29 commented: "Leave it to Beyoncé and Disney to be on the cutting edge of digital campaign trends".

Ben Sisario of The New York Times wrote that the minimal marketing for Black Is King "reflects one of Beyoncé's great talents — stoking public conversation with her art, while explaining very little about it". Ohio State University associate professor Treva Lindsey added that Beyoncé "is allowing her art to speak for itself" and "opening up space for robust conversations".

== Release ==
Black Is King was released globally on July 31, 2020, on Disney+. On the film's release date, the official music video for "Already" was released, as well as a deluxe edition of The Gift which includes both the original and extended versions of "Black Parade" and a remix of "Find Your Way Back" by MeLo-X.

As Disney+ is not yet available in Africa, a distribution deal was made with Central and West African television channel Canal+ Afrique and South African media conglomerate MultiChoice Group's channel M-Net to screen Black Is King across Sub-Saharan Africa on August 1, 2020. For the film's premiere, the MultiChoice Group opened M-Net for all DStv customers. As part of the deal, Black Is King was aired in countries such as South Africa, Nigeria, Ghana, Ethiopia, Namibia, Cameroon, Liberia, Burundi, Senegal, Togo, Somalia, Benin, Congo, Kenya, Ivory Coast, Zimbabwe, Malawi, Gabon, and Cape Verde. Additionally, Emirati television network OSN screened Black Is King throughout the Middle East and North Africa region.

Upon release, Black Is King went straight to number one on the Disney+ Trending chart for the week ending August 2, 2020. Black Is King was one of the 15 most streamed films of 2020. According to Twitter's "Twitter From Home" report, Black Is King was the second most tweeted about movie from March to September in the United States, with Black Panther in first place. Black Is King's release was also one of the eight most talked-about moments on Instagram of 2020.

== Reception ==
=== Critical response ===
Black Is King received praise for its visuals, direction, music, themes, and cultural relevance. Several publications declared Black Is King as Beyoncé's magnum opus, including GQ, Vogue, de Volkskrant, Harper's Bazaar, Glamour, and The Root. The Africa Report was critical, quoting a number of scholars saying that the film romanticised capitalism and ignored the complexity of modern Africa. Beyoncé was accused of cultural appropriation. On review aggregator Rotten Tomatoes the film holds an approval rating of 94% based on 65 reviews, with an average rating of 8.2/10. The website's critical consensus states: "Beyoncé is King." At Metacritic, which assigns a normalized rating to reviews, the film has a weighted average score of 84 out of 100, based on 19 critics, indicating "universal acclaim".

English film critic Mark Kermode, in an episode of Mark Kermode's Secrets of Cinema, characterized Black Is King as a "perfect union of film and popular music", describing it as a "lavish... immersive and eclectic experience" that perfectly captured the zeitgeist of 2020. Writing for Decider, Anna Menta called Black Is King "an undeniably breathtaking, personal, and political work of art". Describing it as "a visual masterpiece" that is "almost overwhelming", Menta praised the many settings and outfits in the film and noted that every detail on screen had meaning. Niellah Arboine of The Independent said Black Is King shows Beyoncé at her most experimental, with a cinematographic style where "every shot is a piece of art" and music genres that the film "seamlessly jumps through". Arboine also praised how the film showcases a diverse range of elements that constitute blackness, such as black debutante balls, London council estates and durags. Odie Henderson of RogerEbert.com described the film as a "jaw-dropping visual achievement", applauding the cinematographers who provided a wide variety of "stunning visuals" that cohere as a whole. Giselle Au-Nhien Nguyen of The Sydney Morning Herald agreed, writing that the film "takes the viewer on a dazzling, hyper-real ride through natural landscapes and space-age futures, while incorporating elements of black history and tradition". Vanessa Friedman, fashion director and chief fashion critic of The New York Times, commented that the "overwhelming" array of outfits are "dazzling, but also calculated", with all of them existing to serve the vision of Beyoncé and reinforce her messages, while also "reinforcing her position as the ultimate cultural tastemaker".

Okla Jones of Consequence of Sound praised Beyoncé's direction and attention to detail, noting how the colors, settings, outfits and music in each scene match the emotional state of the protagonist in his journey. Nathan Weinbender of Inlander praised Beyoncé's unique filmmaking style as one which fuses together mystic, surrealist and African cinematic influences. Weinbender concluded: "She's in complete control of every element here, confidently so, and the texture and warmth she brings to this project suggests it should stay that way." Janell Hobson of Ms. described Beyoncé as an auteur who orchestrated the music, visuals, fashion, dances and artists "in a grand unifying vision". Steve Rose of The Guardian stated that "Beyoncé is emerging as a major figure in cinema", adding that "it's safe to say that Beyoncé is... one of the most significant film-makers" on the planet.

Chanté Joseph of The Guardian praised the film's messages of black unity and empowerment, describing how the film is storytelling led by African creatives showcasing African cultures that also speaks to black people in the diaspora searching for their identity. Jeremy Helligar of Variety wrote that Black Is King "reminds us that Black lives didn't begin in chains" and inspires young black people "to learn about the history of their race and the ways in which it has shaped the world". Writing for Glamour, Candace McDuffie explained how the message of the film is much deeper than a simple retelling of The Lion King, with the film showcasing "the dynamic nature of Blackness" to the world. In a review for NPR, Eric Deggans said that "there's a lot of profundity" in the dialogue of the film, adding that it is clear Beyoncé put a lot of thought into the project and how it could make a significant impact. Sukriti Wahi of Elle Australia praised the inclusion of non-black people of color who have experienced colorism in the film, such as South Asian model Sheerah Ravindren, as well as the showcasing of black fashion designers. Cydney Henderson of USA Today praised how the film highlights African music genres and dance styles and "raw, untapped talent from performers around the world". Characterizing the film as laughable, Armond White of the National Review described Beyoncé as a "curvy fetish object" who is "promoting racial division" in an attempt to ease the "fragile egos" of black people. In a review for Hyperallergic, Jourdain Searles wrote that the film aims to provide representation and "cultural balm" to black people, adding that it feels like the film is tailored more towards black Americans than the wider diaspora.

Dominic Patten of Deadline wrote that with Black Is King, "you have a cultural dominance almost unknown nowadays", with the film being "the conformation of its creator and star as the cultural Queen of our time." Writing for Vogue, Hayley Maitland opined that Beyoncé is "shifting the zeitgeist" with Black Is King, noting that the film's release feels especially timely after the resurgence of Black Lives Matter. Matt Donnelly of Variety wrote that "Beyoncé is pushing the boundaries of what many have come to expect from the Disney machine" with Black Is King being "the boldest brand statement ever from Disney" as Disney's most direct engagement with current discussions on racism.

=== Year-end and all-time lists ===
The Chicago Tribune named Black Is King one of the 50 best movies directed by a person of color. Esquire named the film one of the 12 best movie musicals of all time. Screen Rant ranked the film at number one on its list of the visual albums that have redefined cinema.

NET-A-PORTER ranked Black Is King at number one on its list of the best on-screen fashion moments of 2020, with Katie Berrington describing the film as "a sartorial spectacle of fashion's emerging and established talent". Christine Emba of The Washington Post selected the Black Is King soundtrack as the piece of culture that had the biggest impact on her in 2020, explaining that it "functioned as the most buoyant retort to the summer's narrative of pain". Emba wrote: "Each Afrobeats-inflected track was a reminder that to be Black is not all sadness and struggle: Blackness is also joyful, audacious, unique, creative and proud. The album reminded me that America's tortured relationship with race was only one part of an international experience, not the whole of it. Blackness is bigger than that; in fact, it's transcendent." Entertainment Tonight named Black Is King one of the biggest stories of 2020, describing it as a film that "beautifully celebrates African cultures and roots" and which showcases Beyoncé's attention to detail, citing the "jaw-dropping looks that perfectly encapsulated the visual album's theme of afrofuturism".

The "Already" and "Brown Skin Girl" videos contained within the film were named the best and second-best music videos of 2020, respectively, by Insider. Pitchfork, named "Already" one of the 20 best music videos of 2020, writing: "With the release of her sprawling Disney+ film Black Is King this summer, Beyoncé proved that she remains on the cutting edge of music visuals. Her choreography is emotional and athletic. Her storytelling is personal and vivid. Her references are spiritual and learned." Videos from the film were also listed as some of the best music videos of 2020 by publications such as Vulture, IndieWire, Idolator, USA Today, Vogue, Crack Magazine, Complex, and Slant.

Collider named Black Is King the third best Disney+ film of 2020, describing it as "one of the true pop culture events of 2020" consisting of "moments that celebrate, with incredible choreography and jaw-dropping visuals, the singular power of Blackness". Several other publications included Black Is King in their lists of the best Disney+ films, including Rolling Stone, The Daily Telegraph, Radio Times, Time Out, Entertainment Tonight, CNET, Stylist, and Digital Trends.

Black Is King on year-end lists
Publication	List	Rank	Ref.
1stdibs	20 Memorable Design Moments of 2020	7	
British Vogue	The 12 Best Albums Of 2020	Placed	
CNN	The Cultural Moments That Defined 2020	Placed	
Collider	The Top 10 Disney+ Films of 2020	3	
Dazed	The Most Talked About Fashion Moments of 2020	Placed	
Elle	The Biggest Pop Culture Moments of 2020	9	
Elle	The Biggest Fashion Moments & Trends of 2020	10	
Entertainment Tonight	The Biggest Stories of 2020	Placed	
Essence	Entertainment We Fell In Love With In 2020	2	
Essence	2020's Top Black Film And TV Moments	7	
The Gonzaga Bulletin	The Top 4 Movies of 2020	Placed	
Good Housekeeping	The 27 Most Iconic Pop Culture Moments of 2020	Placed	
Harper's Bazaar	The 20 Top Fashion Moments of 2020	Placed	
Insider	The 50 best movies of the year, according to critics	26	
NET-A-PORTER	The Best On-Screen Fashion Moments From 2020	1	
New York Post	The 12 Biggest Fashion Moments of 2020	Placed	
NPR	NPR Critics Pick the Best TV of 2020	Placed	
Nylon	The 20 Films and TV Shows That Defined 2020	Placed	
People	The Top 10 Movies of 2020	7	
People	The Style Moments That Defined 2020	Placed	
PopSugar	12 Pop Culture Moments That Made 2020 a Little More Bearable	Placed	
Refinery29	The Best Fashion Moments In Movies & TV In 2020	Placed	
The Root	Top 10 Moments of Joy From 2020	Placed	
Sight & Sound (Rebecca Harrison)	The Best Films of 2020	7	
Slant Magazine (Sam C. Mac)	Slant's Best Films of 2020	5	
Town & Country	The Biggest Fashion Moments from 2020	Placed	
Star Tribune	The 10 Best On-Screen Performances of 2020	2	
USA Today	10 Movies That Got Us Through Quarantine This Summer	1	
USA Today	The Top Moments of 2020	Placed	
Vocalo	The 10 Best Movies of 2020	Placed	
Vogue	The 9 Best Fashion Moments From 2020's Most Stylish Films	Placed	
Vogue	The 29 Best Fashion Moments of 2020	Placed	
Vogue India	7 Great Moments for Inclusivity in 2020	5	
The Washington Post (Christine Emba)	Post Columnists' 2020 Favorites	1	

=== Awards and nominations ===
Beyoncé led the nominations at the 63rd Annual Grammy Awards, with six nominations for Black Is King, including Best Music Film, Best Music Video for "Brown Skin Girl", and four additional awards for "Black Parade". The film's nomination in Best Music Film made Beyoncé the most nominated artist in this category in Grammy history, with five nominations. Recording Academy Chief Harvey Mason Jr. commented that "in this particular year, [Beyoncé] released a body of work that impressed a lot of voters and a lot of people on the committee". After winning for the "Brown Skin Girl" video in the "Best Music Video" category, Blue Ivy received the Guinness World Record for the youngest individually credited winner at the Grammy Awards. "Black Parade" won Best R&B Performance, which was Beyoncé's 28th Grammy win, making her the most awarded singer, most awarded female artist, and second-most awarded artist in Grammy history.

At the 73rd Primetime Emmy Awards, Black Is King won Outstanding Costumes for a Variety, Nonfiction, or Reality Program. Television Academy governor Laura Guzik said that the film is a "superb example of the art of costume design and supervision, showing great creativity in the conception and execution" of its unique vision. Costume designer Zerina Akers is the second black woman to win this award in history.

Beyoncé led the nominations at the 52nd NAACP Image Awards alongside Netflix and HBO, with her nominations including six for Black Is King. Beyoncé was the second-most nominated artist at the 2020 MVPA Awards, with her nominations including Best Special Video Project for Black Is King and five additional awards for "Already". At the 2020 UK Music Video Awards, Beyoncé was one of the four artists leading the nominations, with her nominations including Best Music Film for Black Is King and three additional awards for "Already", of which it won Best Styling in a Video. At the 2020 Soul Train Music Awards, "Brown Skin Girl" won Video of the Year, marking her second win in this category out of nine nominations, the most of any artist.

Award	Category	Nominated Work	Result	Ref.
AICP Post Awards	Color Grading: Music Video	"Already"	Nominated	
AICP Post Awards	Color Grading: Music Video	"Brown Skin Girl"	Won	
Art Directors Guild Awards	Excellence in Production Design for a Variety Special	Black Is King	Won	
Black Reel Awards	Outstanding Television Documentary or Special	Black Is King	Nominated	
Black Reel Awards	Outstanding Music	Black Is King	Nominated	
Bulletin Awards	Film of the Year	Black Is King	Won	
Cannes Lions Awards	Excellence in Music Video	"Brown Skin Girl"	Gold	
Grammy Awards	Best Music Film	Black Is King	Nominated	
Grammy Awards	Best Music Video	"Brown Skin Girl"	Won	
Grammy Awards	Record of the Year	"Black Parade"	Nominated	
Grammy Awards	Song of the Year	"Black Parade"	Nominated	
Grammy Awards	Best R&B Performance	"Black Parade"	Won	
Grammy Awards	Best R&B Song	"Black Parade"	Nominated	
HipHopDx Awards	Best Hip Hop Movie	Black Is King	Nominated	
Location Managers Guild International Awards	Outstanding Locations in a Contemporary Film	Black Is King	Nominated	
MTV Movie & TV Awards	Best Musical Moment	Black Is King	Nominated	
MTV Video Music Awards	Best R&B	"Brown Skin Girl"	Nominated	
MTV Video Music Awards	Best Cinematography	"Brown Skin Girl"	Won	
MTV Video Music Awards	Best Art Direction	"Already"	Nominated	
MVPA Awards	Best Special Video Project	Black Is King	Nominated	
MVPA Awards	Best R&B/Soul Video	"Already"	Nominated	
MVPA Awards	Best Styling in a Video	"Already"	Nominated	
MVPA Awards	Best Production Design	"Already"	Nominated	
MVPA Awards	Best Choreography	"Already"	Nominated	
MVPA Awards	Best Editing	"Already"	Nominated	
NAACP Image Awards	Outstanding Variety Show – Series or Special	Black Is King	Nominated	
NAACP Image Awards	Outstanding Directing in a Television Movie or Special	Black Is King	Nominated	
NAACP Image Awards	Outstanding Music Video/Visual Album	Black Is King	Nominated	
NAACP Image Awards	Outstanding Music Video/Visual Album	"Brown Skin Girl"	Won	
NAACP Image Awards	Outstanding Soul/R&B Song	"Black Parade"	Nominated	
NAACP Image Awards	Outstanding Female Artist	"Black Parade"	Won	
Primetime Emmy Awards	Outstanding Costumes for a Variety, Nonfiction, or Reality Program	Black Is King	Won	
Set Decorators Society of America Awards	Best Achievement in Decor/Design of a Variety Special	Black Is King	Won	
Soul Train Music Awards	Video of the Year	"Brown Skin Girl"	Won	
UK Music Video Awards	Best Music Film	Black Is King	Nominated	
UK Music Video Awards	Best R&B/Soul Video – International	"Already"	Nominated	
UK Music Video Awards	Best Styling in a Video	"Already"	Won	
UK Music Video Awards	Best Choreography in a Video	"Already"	Nominated	
UK Music Video Awards	Best R&B/Soul Video – International	"Brown Skin Girl"	Nominated	
UK Music Video Awards	Best Wardrobe Styling in a Video	"Brown Skin Girl"	Nominated	

== Impact ==
=== Commercial and fashion influence ===
At The Walt Disney Company Q3 2020 earnings call, CEO Bob Chapek announced that Disney+ reached its five-year subscriber goal in eight months, crediting Black Is King for an increase of approximately 3 million subscribers. Chapek described how Black Is King is "being widely celebrated for its diverse cast, stunning artistry and inspiring interpretation of the Black experience", adding that it clearly shows "the power of the Disney+ platform for premiering world-class content".

Many of the designers Beyoncé and her dancers wore in Black Is King saw triple-digit spikes in search traffic after the film's release. The Marine Serre moon print bodysuit that is featured in the film became "the most popular design of 2020", with the brand seeing a 426% increase in searches in the 48 hours after the film's release. After Mia Vesper's designs were featured in the film, she rapidly developed a large customer base, including celebrities such as Paris Hilton, Billie Eilish, Lena Waithe, and Machine Gun Kelly. Steff Yotka of Vogue wrote that "Black Is King was the digital fashion event of the summer, upstaging official fashion weeks by aligning garments with history, celebrity, purpose, and unparalleled beauty". Beyoncé's fashion in the film made her become the most influential woman in fashion in 2020. The film also helped raise awareness of African fashion worldwide. The film kicked off hair and makeup trends, with stylists and artists around the world creating looks inspired by those in Black Is King.

The Victoria & Albert Museum featured a dress worn by Beyoncé in Black Is King in its permanent exhibition. The dress is one of the first of the V&A Museum's acquisitions for its new site in East London. An exhibition in the African American Museum titled "Hair Story", artist Youveline Joseph produced artworks inspired by Black Is King that recreated some of the braided hairstyles from the film.

=== Scholarly research ===
Universities have offered programming that involves studying Black Is King. Harvard University offered a program inspired by the film titled "Black Is Queen: The Divine Feminine in Kush". The course will use songs from the film to explore the high status of women in the Nubian Kingdom of Kush and "how ancient Africans of the Nile Valley understood female power and presence". New York University hosted an event titled "The Making and Unpacking of Beyoncé's Black Is King", sponsored by the Center for Black Visual Culture/Institute of African American Affairs-NYU and the Clive Davis Institute of Recorded Music and Department of Photography & Imaging at NYU Tisch School of the Arts. The event discussed "the creative process and cultural impact of this diasporic project" and featured guests including Assistant Curator at the Whitney Museum of American Art Rujeko Hockley, musician and scholar Jason King, ethnomusicologist Fredara Mareva Hadley, Center for Black Visual Culture program director Joan Morgan, and the film's contributors Kwasi Fordjour, Melo-X and Clover Hope.

Dissect, a podcast that takes an academic approach to analyze culturally impactful albums, dedicated a seven-episode season to Black Is King. The hosts conduct an in-depth exploration of the historical references, African symbolism, and lyrical metaphors within the film.

Inspired by Black Is King, the New York Public Library published a guide of various materials (such as literature, documentaries, and photographic collections) that "you can use to expand your knowledge of the arts and cultures from across the African Diaspora", building on the film's aim of celebrating the various cultures of the diaspora through art, fashion, and music.

=== Popular culture ===
A TikTok and social media trend titled "#MyPowerChallenge" was created after the film's release, whereby participants recreate the dance from the "My Power" video in Black Is King.

American rapper Yung Baby Tate cited Black Is King as a "very big inspiration" for the concept and editing of the music video for her 2021 single "I Am". In December 2020, British singer-songwriter James Blake released a cover of "Otherside" from Black Is King, adapted as "When We're Older" with some new lyrics.

== See also ==
- List of Afrofuturist films
