= Natalia Fedner =

American fashion designer and actress

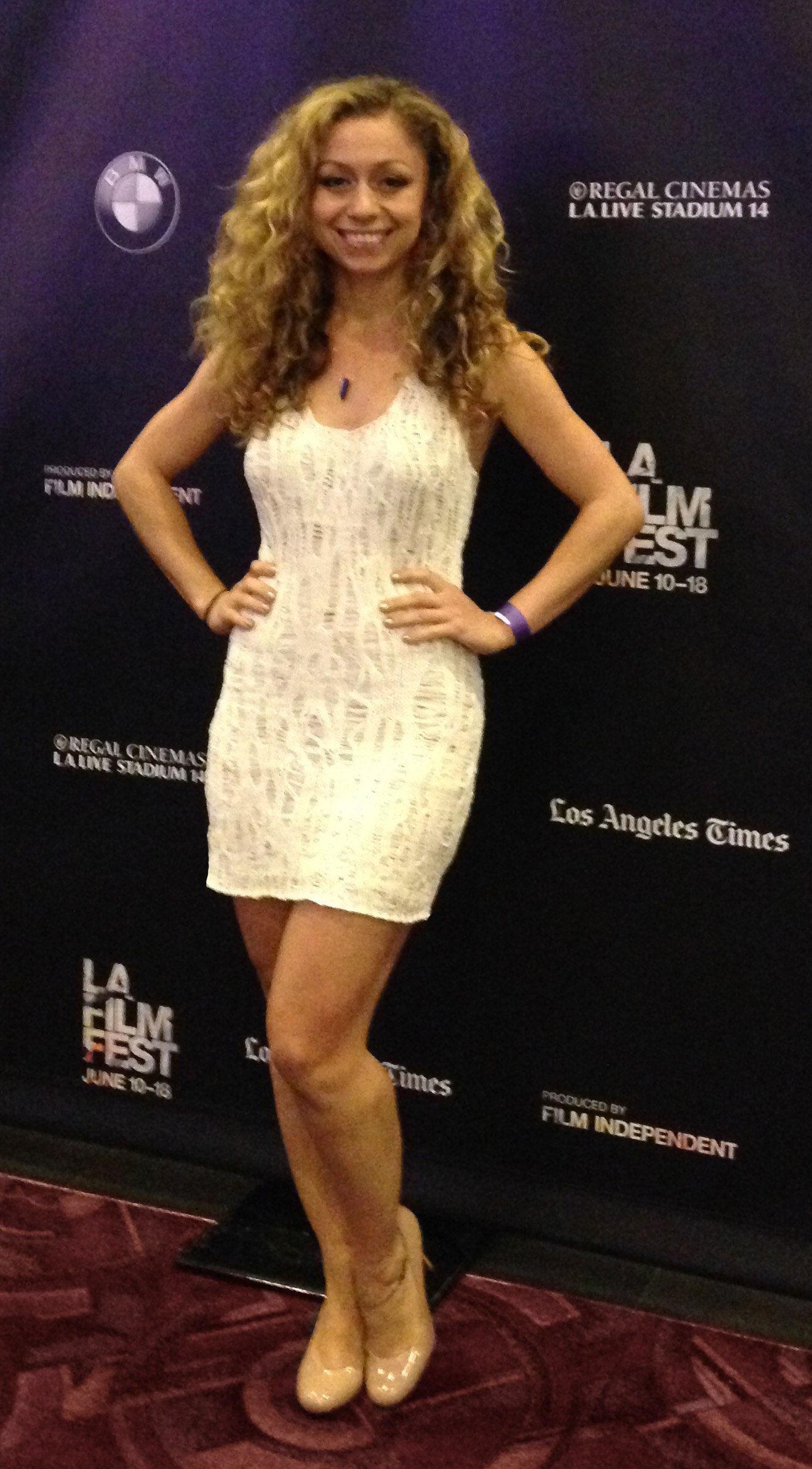
- Fedner at the 2015 LA Film Festival
- Born: February 12, 1983 (age 43); Chernivtsi, Chernivtsi Oblast, Ukrainian SSR, Soviet Union
- Education: Parsons School of Design and Parsons Paris
- Occupations: Fashion designer, inventor, actress
- Label: Natalia Fedner
- Awards: Silver Thimble Winner Parsons Paris, 2004; Bexley Distinguished Alumni Award, 2021; Rising Star Eveningwear Award FGI, 2025
- Website: www.nataliafedner.com

Natalia Fedner is an American fashion designer, inventor, artist and actress, best known for inventing a six-way stretch metal textile.

== Early life and education ==
Fedner was born in Chernivtsi, in the Ukrainian SSR (now Ukraine), and immigrated to Columbus, Ohio as a refugee at the age of six with her parents. Her mother, Alla Fedner, is a computer programmer, and her father, Gregory Fedner, is a civil engineer. She has twin sisters who were born in the United States.

Fedner attended art classes at Columbus College of Art and Design on a merit-based scholarship from the third through twelfth grade.

After graduating from Bexley High School in Bexley, Ohio, Fedner completed the Fashion Design BFA program at Parsons School of Design (New York City and Parsons Paris). During her freshman year she was selected to compete in "Fusion Fashion: FIT vs. Parsons" and received the Fusion Award. Fedner studied under Tim Gunn at Parsons and won the Silver Thimble Award for best collection her junior year. During her senior year her designs were featured in the Saks Fifth Avenue Holiday Window Display.

== Career ==
Following internships for Donna Karan and Marc Jacobs, Fedner worked as a design assistant at Calvin Klein Women's Collection under Francisco Costa.

In 2014 Fedner was cast as a contestant on the first season of Lifetime's Project Runway: Under the Gunn, where she finished sixth.

Fedner was a costume designer on the second season of Epic Rap Battles of History. The popular YouTube series won a Streamy Award for the best use of fashion and design for that season.

In 2014 Fedner launched her eponymous couture label in Los Angeles. Jennifer Lopez wore a Natalia Fedner couture knit gown in her First Love music video, becoming the first celebrity to publicly mention the new label during an interview with Entertainment Tonight in May 2014.

"Natalia Fedner" designs have been worn by a number of notable celebrities including actress Charlize Theron, actor/singer Lenny Kravitz, actress/singer Jennifer Lopez, television and social media personality Kim Kardashian, media personality Kylie Jenner, singer Shakira, singer/songwriter Alicia Keys, actress Sharon Stone, singer and actress Cher, rapper Cardi B, singer Doja Cat, singer Rosalía, actress Pamela Anderson, rapper Megan Thee Stallion, singer Camila Cabello, singer Kim Petras, actress Hailee Steinfeld, actress and singer Vanessa Hudgens, singer Anitta, actress and singer Keke Palmer, singer Karol G, singer Becky G, and singer Bebe Rexha.

In 2016, Entertainment Tonight reported that Beyoncé wore a Natalia Fedner metal dress in Lemonade and predicted Fedner would soon be a household name. Fedner custom made the piece for Beyoncé under the direction of stylist B Akerlund for the underwater scene and was listed as one of the top looks in the HBO film by Harper's Bazaar, Elle, and New York Magazine's The Cut.

In 2018 Natalia Fedner's eponymous collection was accepted into Bergdorf Goodman under the direction of senior vice president, Linda Fargo. Her designs were featured in the store's display windows in September 2018 and March 2019.

In August 2020, The Hollywood Reporter reported that Fedner had collaborated once more with Beyoncé. Partnering with her stylist, Zerina Akers, she designed a gold chain headpiece worn by Beyoncé in the "Already" section of the visual album Black is King. The look was featured in Vogue, Harper's Bazaar, Dezeen, and Billboard.

In July 2021, Fedner held her first solo fashion show presenting her Spring/Summer 2022 Ready-To-Wear collection at Miami Swim Week. And in August 2021, Fedner received the patent for her six-way stretch metal textile capturing Vogue's attention and leading to a feature article calling Fedner "The Designer Creating the Hottest Celebrity Looks Made of Metal".

In October 2021, Fedner received the Emerging Leader Alumni Award from Bexley High School.

In August 2022, it was confirmed that Fedner was working on designs for Beyoncé's Renaissance album.

Shakira brought international attention to Fedner's designs when she posted a video to her socials on March 14, 2025 discussing the designer's work on Shakira's Las Mujeres No LLoran World Tour. Fedner had previously worked with Shakira on her 2024 Coachella look and her "Copa Vacia" and "Don't Wait Up" music videos.

In April 2025, Fedner received the FGI Rising Star Eveningwear Award at the Annual FGI Rising Star Gala, presented to her by Ken Downing, creative director of Halston. Of the achievement Fedner said “I am a refugee and the daughter of refugees. I was born in Ukraine. I came to this country with nothing like many other people in this room. My story is not unique. I have worked so hard for so long and this is truly the first time that I am being recognized at this level."

== Awards ==
- Parsons Paris Silver Thimble Winner, 2004
- Bexley Distinguished Alumni Award, 2021
- FGI Rising Star Eveningwear, 2025

== Causes and advocacy ==
In February 2020, Fedner was invited to visit Ukraine by the Ukrainian Fashion Club.

This was her first visit since leaving as a refugee. After Russia attacked Ukraine on February 24, 2022, Fedner began fundraising and coordinating with NGOs and established charities to help Ukrainian refugees, including people she met during her 2020 visit.

In October 2022, Fedner held a fashion show to raise money for medical supplies for Ukrainians.
