= Already (song) =

2020 song by Beyoncé featuring Shatta Wale and Major Lazer

Song by Beyoncé, Shatta Wale and Major Lazer

from the album The Lion King: The Gift
- Released: July 19, 2019
- Genre: Dancehall; Afropop
- Length: 3:43
- Label: Parkwood; Columbia; Pulse Publishing Administration
- Songwriters: Beyoncé; Brittany "Starrah" Hazard; Charles Nii Armah Mensah; Clément Picard; Maxime Picard; Ronald Banful; Thomas Wesley Pentz; Toumani Diabaté
- Composer: GuiltyBeatz
- Producers: Beyoncé; Diplo; Picard Brothers

Music video
- "Already" on YouTube

"Already" (stylized in uppercase) is a song by American singer Beyoncé, Ghanaian singer Shatta Wale and American trio Major Lazer from the 2019 album The Lion King: The Gift and featured in the 2020 film Black Is King.

== Release ==
"Already" was written by Beyoncé, Starrah, Nii Armah Mensah, Picard Brothers Ronald Banful and Diplo, with Beyoncé, Diplo and Picard Brothers producing the song respectively.

"Already" was originally released as a track in 2019's The Lion King: The Gift, a soundtrack album curated by Beyoncé for the 2019 photorealistic animated remake of The Lion King. It was then featured in Black Is King, a visual counterpart and television film for the album, released on Disney Plus on July 31, 2020. Its music video was uploaded separately to YouTube and Instagram a few hours prior to the film's release.

== Composition and lyrical interpretation ==
Craig Jenkins of Vulture described the song as a "tune about remembering your roots" and suggested that the song pertains to when a "lost and dethroned Simba [from 2019's The Lion King] is forced to come to terms with his legacy. Jon Pareles of The New York Times stated that "Already" acted as a "springboard" for "[the 2019 Lion King's] plot points" alongside "Keys to the Kingdom" and "Scar", songs also featured on The Lion King: The Gift. Matthew Meadow of Your EDM described Beyoncé's vocals on "Already" as "flawlessly smooth", whereas Devki Nehra of Firstpost described the song as "reggae-heavy."

== Music video ==
=== Production ===
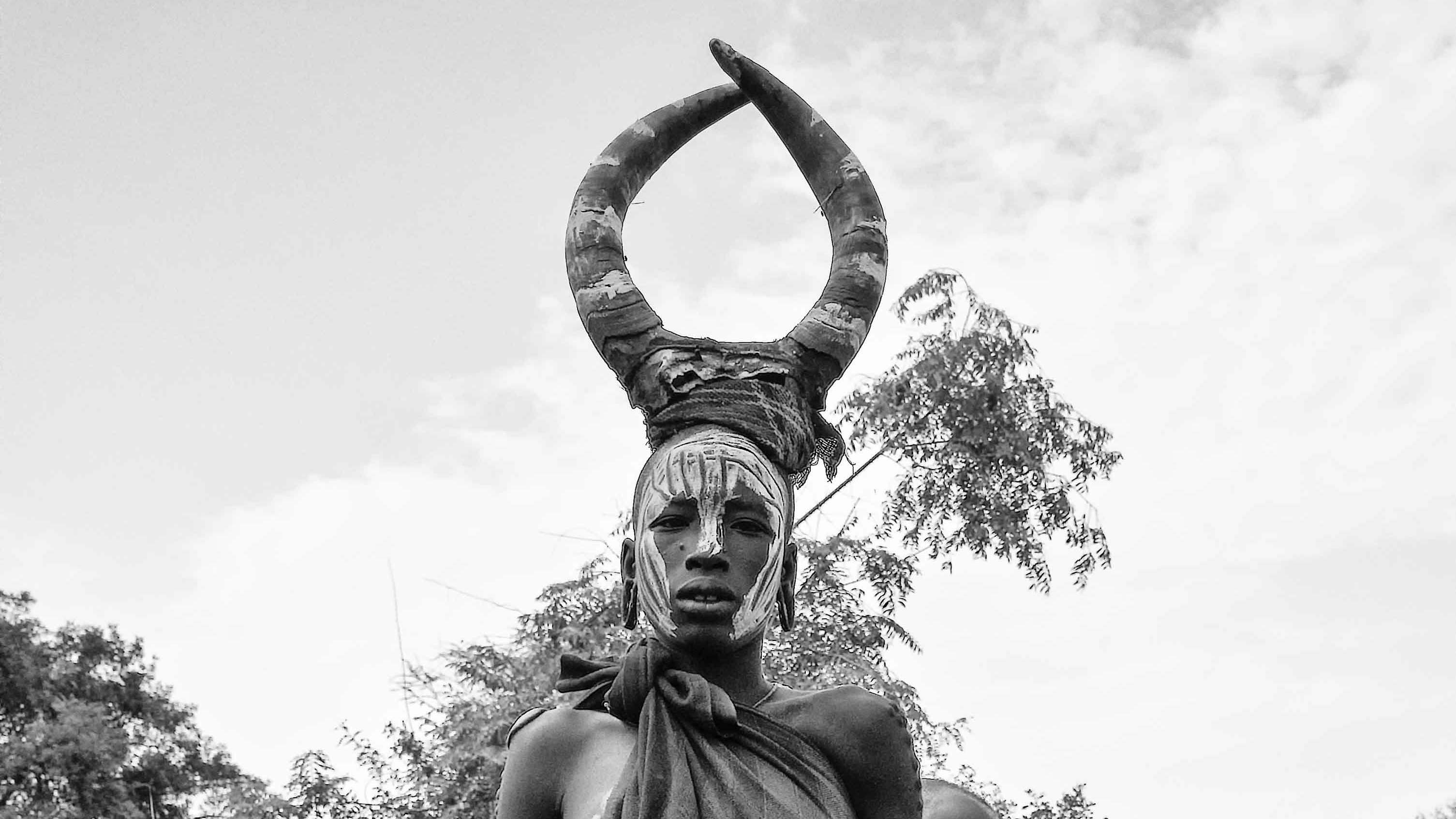
The Mursi people's use of horns inspired a hairstyle in the video.

Stylist Zerina Akers spoke about how she "wanted to reference different cultures, traditions and tribes, but to have the freedom to create fantasy, for people to be able to escape into a new world" through the fashion in the film. One costume in the "Already" video was a 5:31 Jérôme blue Nigerian lace trench dress with an accompanying Nigerian gele, inspired by the fashion of matriarchal women at Nigerian weddings. Another costume, a Burberry cowprint top and skirt, was inspired by the Xhosa and Zulu people of South Africa, who use the hide of Nguni cattle in their shields. Akers also collaborated with American fashion designer Natalia Fedner on a gold chain headpiece covered in gold earrings of various styles and sizes; embedding the earrings into Fedner's patent pending chain textile headdress, Akers wanted to show how gold jewelry connects generations of black women and the African diaspora.

The hairstyles in ''Black Is King'' were inspired by various traditional African hairstyles, with hairstylist Neal Farinah and Beyoncé also striving to offer insight into African culture with every style. One of Beyoncé's hairstyles in the "Already" video was inspired by the horned heads and lip plates of the Dinka and Mursi peoples, who wear them as symbols of prestige and honour. Another of the hairstyles used Bantu knots to pay respect to the Zulu people, with an ankh symbol in the center to symbolize life as in ancient Egyptian culture.

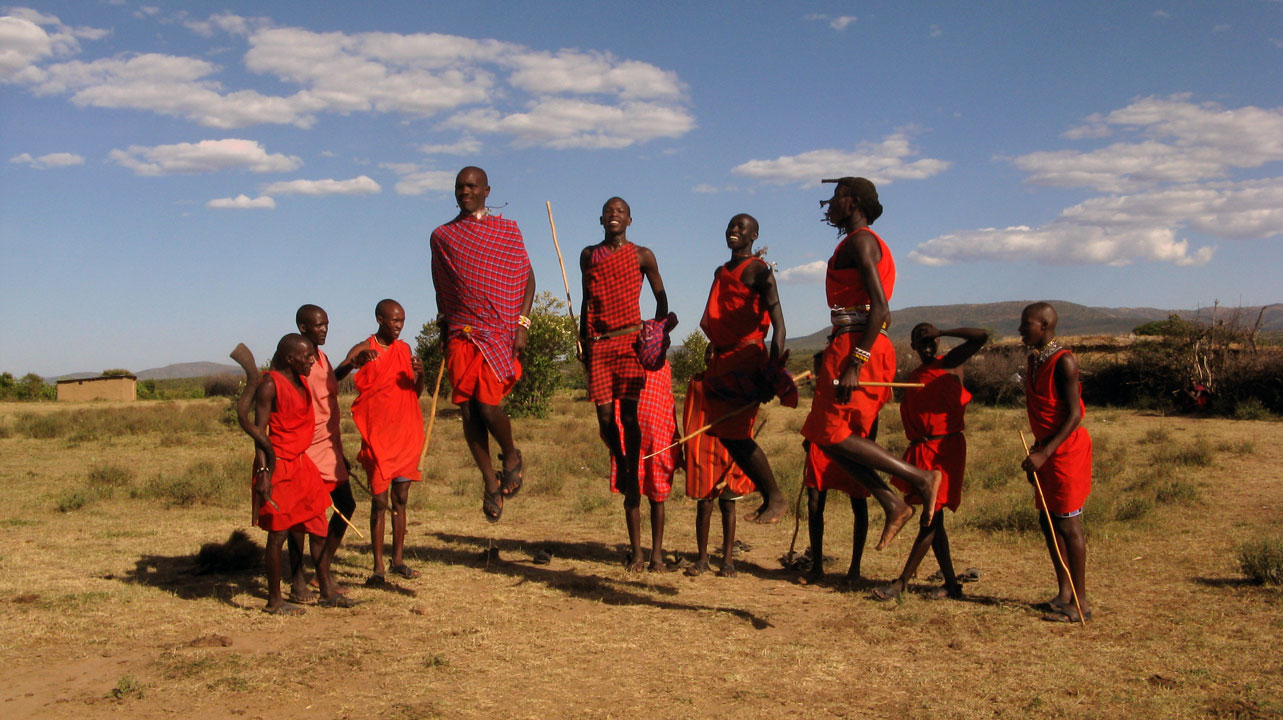
Choreography in the video was inspired by the adumu jumping dance of the Maasai people.

Members of the Accra-based dance school Dance With Purpose (DWP) Academy were recruited for the video. In 2019, the DWP Academy posted their own choreography for the song after it was first released. This caught the attention of Beyoncé and her team reached out to them to invite them to feature in Black Is King. Stephen Ojo and Caleb Bonney of dance group AVO (Africa's Very Own) Boyz worked with American choreographer JaQuel Knight on the choreography for the video. Ojo and Bonney showed Knight choreography to the track that they had made a few days prior for a class they were teaching. They then taught Beyoncé the choreography, including several dance styles from throughout Africa, such as the Gbese, Poco and Kpakujemu from Nigeria, the C’est Moi from Ivory Coast, and the network from Ghana. Ojo said that his aim for the choreography "was to make sure the moves we were bringing out were properly represented and danced in the right way. I wanted to make sure Africa was being represented properly and not diluted." Ojo commented on his experience working with Beyoncé, saying: "She was a very good student. Paying homage to the originators, paying respect to our culture—some people might not care. But she was very receptive. She was being respectful the whole time, listening. And every move was clean, sharp, crisp." A scene where black men in purple suits jumping up and down in unison is a reference to the adumu Maasai jumping dance of Kenya and Tanzania, a ceremony in which men in a circle compete for who can jump the highest with a straight posture.

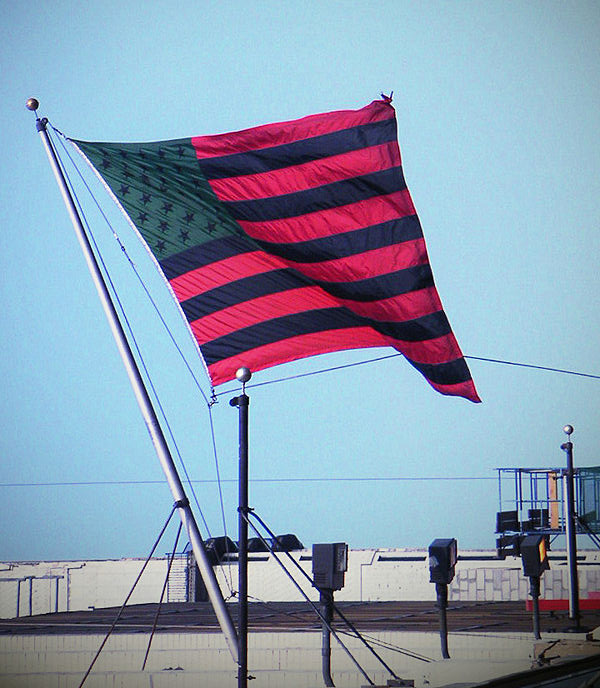
David Hammons' 1990 piece African-American Flag was added to the set.

Ugo Rondinone's sun sculptures, which symbolize rebirth and renewal, were featured in the "Already" music video in order to reflect the film's motif of the 'circle of life'. African-American Flag was also included in the video; the piece was created by David Hammons in 1990 to represent the marginalization of African-American artists and is seen as a symbol of black liberation.

Portions of the video were filmed in Ghana, with the Ghanaian chapter of the film being led by director Joshua Kissi. Filming took place in the Eastern Region and Greater Accra Region, with the team wanting to include locations that were underrepresented in depictions of Ghana, such as Shatta Wale's hometown of Nima.

=== Release ===
The full music video for "Already" premiered on YouTube and was uploaded to Instagram on July 31, 2020, only a few hours prior to the release of Black Is King on Disney+ in which it featured. It became the first music video from the film to be uploaded as a standalone video, with "Brown Skin Girl" following soon after.

=== Critical response ===
Callie Ahlgrim of Insider ranked "Already" as the best music video of 2020, describing the video as a "painstakingly styled and deeply impressive enterprise. You can pause "Already" at literally any moment and it will look like a painting." The video was also listed as one of the best music videos of 2020 by publications such as Vulture, Idolator, USA Today, Vogue, Crack Magazine, and Slant. Althea Legaspi of Rolling Stone described the video as "vibrant" and "visually arresting", also noting that the inclusion of "dancers from around the world interwoven throughout the clip" highlights Black Is King's purpose as an "inspiring celebration of being Black, from its elegant choreography and fashion to the global locations". Jon Powell of Revolt praised the "dancing and choreography", "variety of vibrant locations", and tributes to African cultures and "Black kings around the world". Brea Cubit of PopSugar agreed, similarly praising the "gorgeous outfits, mesmerising choreography, and nods to African culture" seen in the video. Pitchfork named "Already" one of the best music videos of 2020, writing: "With the release of her sprawling Disney+ film Black Is King this summer, Beyoncé proved that she remains on the cutting edge of music visuals... Even as a part of a huge cinematic effort, "Already" is a world of its own."

=== Impact ===
The Marine Serre moon print bodysuit that is featured in the "Already" video became "the most popular design of 2020", with the brand seeing a 426% increase in searches in the 48 hours after Black Is King's release. Steff Yotka of Vogue wrote that "Black Is King was the digital fashion event of the summer, upstaging official fashion weeks by aligning garments with history, celebrity, purpose, and unparalleled beauty."

== Awards and nominations ==
Year	Ceremony	Award	Result	Ref(s).
2020	Soul Train Music Awards	Best Dance Performance	Nominated	
2020	UK Music Video Awards	Best R&B/Soul Video – International	Nominated	
2020	UK Music Video Awards	Best Styling in a Video	Won	
2020	UK Music Video Awards	Best Choreography in a Video	Nominated	
2020	All Africa Music Awards	Best Collaboration	Nominated	
2020	African Entertainment Awards USA	Best Collaboration	Won	
2020	African Entertainment Awards USA	Song of the Year	Nominated	
2020	MVPA Awards	Best R&B/Soul Video	Nominated	
2020	MVPA Awards	Best Styling in a Video	Nominated	
2020	MVPA Awards	Best Production Design	Nominated	
2020	MVPA Awards	Best Choreography	Nominated	
2020	MVPA Awards	Best Editing	Nominated	
2021	AICP Post Awards	Color Grading: Music Video	Nominated	
2021	MTV Video Music Awards	Best Art Direction	Nominated	

== Charts ==
=== Weekly charts ===
Weekly chart performance for "Already"
Chart (2019–2020)	Peak position
Belgium (Ultratip Bubbling Under Flanders)	9
Belgium (Ultratip Bubbling Under Wallonia)	22
France (SNEP Sales Chart)	49
New Zealand Hot Singles (RMNZ)	36
UK Singles (OCC)	95
US Digital Song Sales (Billboard)	50
US Hot R&B Songs (Billboard)	22
US R&B/Hip-Hop Digital Song Sales (Billboard)	9
World Digital Song Sales (Billboard)	2

== Certifications ==
Region	Certification	Certified units/sales
Canada (Music Canada)	Gold	40,000^{‡}
France (SNEP)	Gold	100,000^{‡}
United Kingdom (BPI)	Silver	200,000^{‡}
United States (RIAA)	Gold	500,000^{‡}
^{‡} Sales+streaming figures based on certification alone.
