= Clover Hope =

Guyanese-American music journalist

- Born: Guyana
- Education: New York University (BA)
- Occupation: Journalist
- Writing career
- Language: English
- Years active: 2005 — present
- Subjects: Pop music, hip hop, interview
- Notable work: Black is King (co-writer)
- Website: www.cloverhope.com

Clover Hope is a Guyanese-American music journalist. She was previously an editor at Billboard, XXL, and Jezebel. She is a contributing editor for Pitchfork as of 2020. Hope's debut book The Motherlode: 100+ Women Who Made Hip-Hop was released in 2021.

== Early life and education ==
Hope was born in Guyana and immigrated to New York City when she was three years old. She was raised in both Brooklyn and Queens. She cited DMX's It's Dark and Hell is Hot and the work of Missy Elliott as two sources that cultivated her love for hip hop.

Hope graduated magna cum laude from New York University with a bachelor's degree in journalism.

== Career ==
=== Journalism ===
Hope's first job in journalism after college began in 2005 as an online editor at Billboard. She went on to work at XXL for three years and then moved on to be senior editor at Vibe. She was hired as a staff writer for Jezebel in 2014 and left in 2020. Her work has also appeared in outlets including The Village Voice, ESPN, GQ, and Harper's Bazaar. She has been a contributing editor at Pitchfork since 2020.

Beyoncé's featured September 2018 Vogue editorial included an as-told-to interview with Hope. The writer again collaborated with Beyoncé as a co-writer on Black Is King (2020).

=== Other work ===
She is a co-executive producer for Black Renaissance, a Black arts and culture YouTube Originals special that premiered February 26, 2021.

Hope is an adjunct professor at New York University.

Her debut book The Motherlode: 100+ Women Who Made Hip-Hop was released in 2021. The book profiles iconic women in hip-hop like Roxanne Shanté and Nicki Minaj and provides historical context as well as the perspectives of the featured artists.
