= Mapoch =

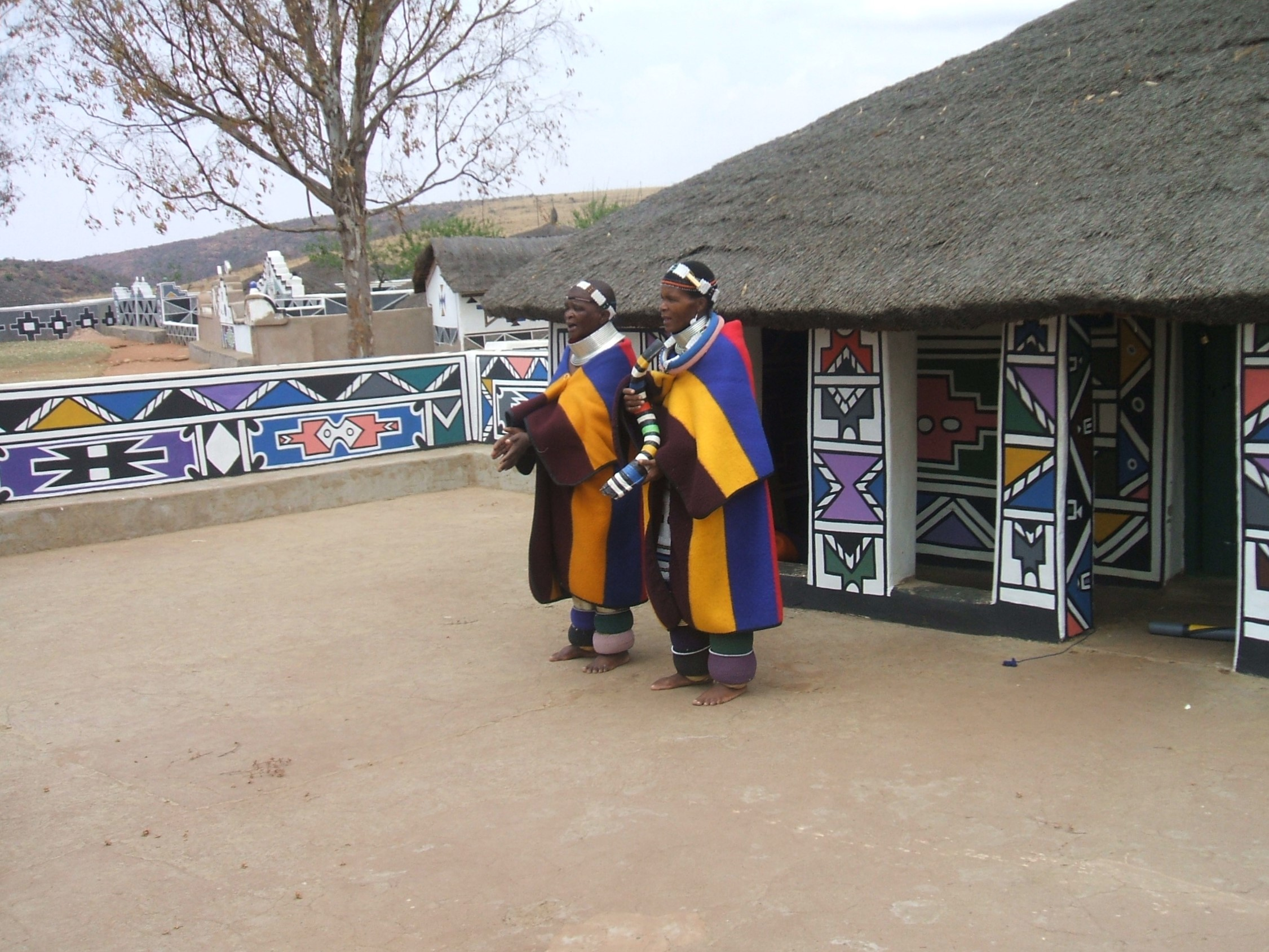
- Mapoch Village

- Location within Mpumalanga Location within South Africa
- Coordinates: 25.102°S 29.005°E
- Country: South Africa
- Province: Mpumalanga
- District: Nkangala
- Municipality: Dr JS Moroka

Area
  - Total: 10.40 km^{2} (4.02 sq mi)

Population (2011)
  - Total: 9,169
  - Density: 881.6/km^{2} (2,283/sq mi)

Racial makeup (2011)
  - Black African: 99.8%
  - Indian/Asian: 0.1%

First languages (2011)
  - S. Ndebele: 88.2%
  - Zulu: 3.5%
  - Sepedi: 3.3%
  - Sotho: 1.9%
  - Other: 3.1%
- Time zone: UTC+2 (SAST)

Mapoch is a town in Dr JS Moroka Local Municipality in the Mpumalanga province of South Africa.

Mapoch is a rural village, and the local community still lives in a traditional village manner.
