= Treva Lindsey =

American academic

Dr Treva Lindsey
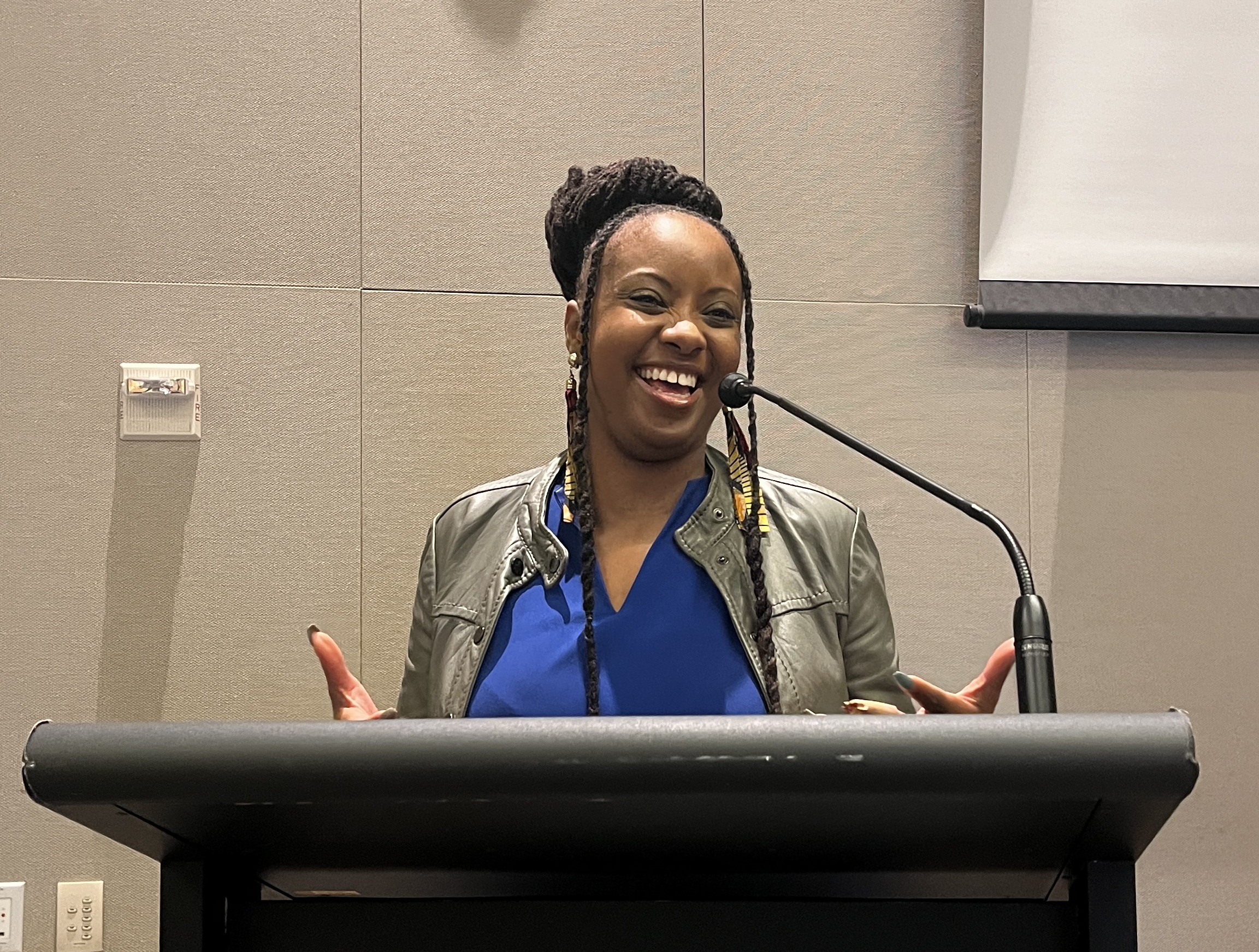
- Lindsey speaking in 2024
- Citizenship: United States of America
- Occupation: Professor

Academic background
- Education: Oberlin College (B.A.); Duke University (M.A.)(Ph.D.)

Academic work
- Main interests: Black feminism(s); Hip hop studies; Critical race and gender theory; Sexual politics; African diaspora studies; Black popular and expressive culture; African American women’s history
- Notable works: Colored No More: Reinventing Black Womanhood in Washington D.C. America Goddam: Violence, Black Women, and The Struggle for Justice

Treva B. Lindsey is an American academic. She is Professor of Women's, Gender, and Sexuality Studies at the Ohio State University and the author of Colored No More: Reinventing Black Womanhood in Washington D.C. (University of Illinois Press, 2017) and America Goddam: Violence, Black Women, and The Struggle for Justice (University of California Press, 2022).

== Education ==
Lindsey attended Oberlin College, graduating in 2004, then earned an MA (2006) and PhD (2010) from Duke University.

== Works and awards ==
=== Selected publications ===
- “F$ck the Grammys: The Conundrum of “Transcending” Race and the Politics of Excellence,” in Culture as Catalyst: Conversations at the Tang Museum to Spark Change, ed. Isolde Brialmier, Tang Teaching Museum, 2020.
- “The Complicated Struggle for Woman Suffrage: A Scholarly Discussion Guide,” published by the League of Women Voters Ohio, October 2019
- “King Bey,” Queen Bey: 16 Writers Celebrate the Beauty, Power, and Creativity of Beyoncé Knowles-Carter, New York: Macmillan Publishers, 2019
- “M4BL and the Critical Matter of Black Lives,” co-written with Brittney Cooper, Biography: An Interdisciplinary Quarterly (Vol. 41, No. 4) Fall 2018, pp. 731–740.
- “Respectability Politics,” in Gender: Space. Aimee Meredith Cox, ed Part of the Macmillan Interdisciplinary Handbooks: Gender series. Farmington Hills, MI: Macmillan Reference USA, 2018.
- “Ain’t Nobody Got Time For That: Anti-Black Girl Violence in the Era of #SayHerName,” A special issue of Urban Education on Urban Youth, Schooling, and Education in the Era of Black Lives Matter, Autumn 2017, pp. 1–14.
- “Negro Women May Be Dangerous: Black Women’s Insurgent Activism in the Movement for Black Lives,” SOULS Journal (Vol. 19, 3) September 2017, pp. 1–13.
- “Why You So Angry?: Serena Williams, Black Girl Pain, and the Pernicious Power of Stereotypes,” in Between the World and the Urban Classrooms, eds. Christopher Emdin and George Sirrakos Jr., Sense Publishers, April 2017
