= Christine Emba =

American writer

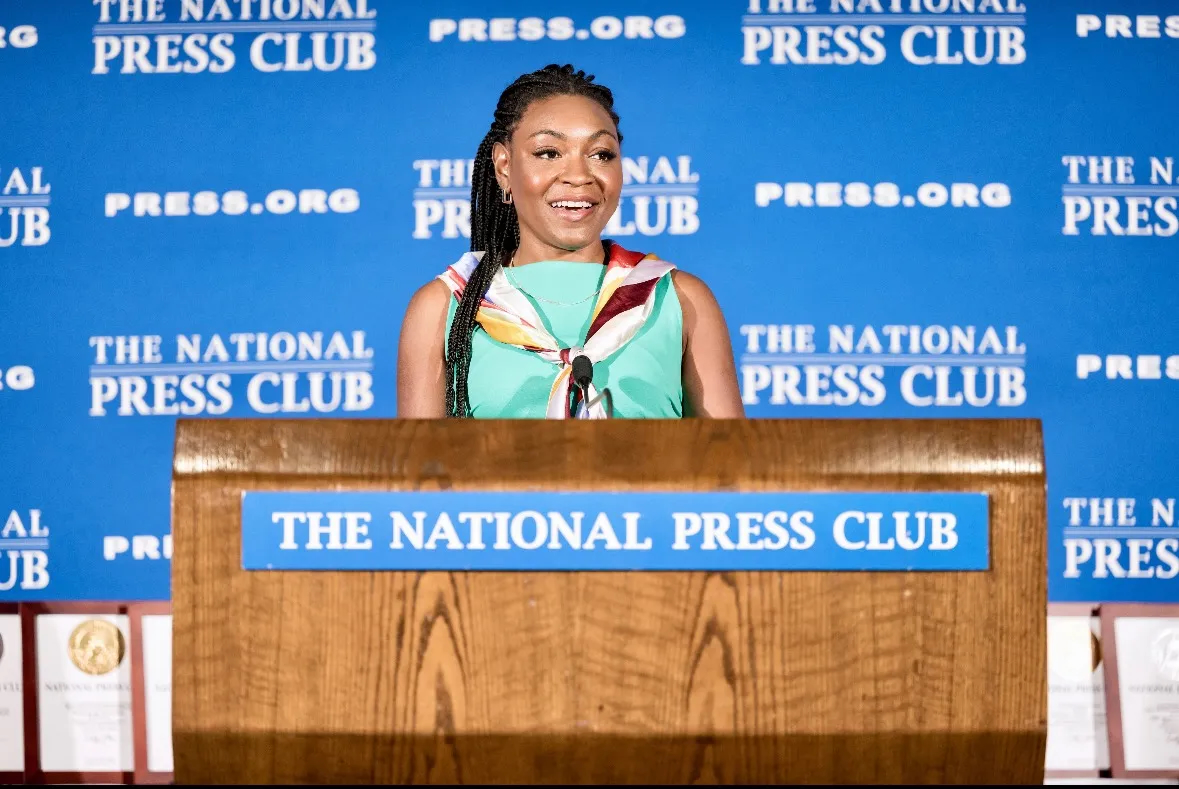
- Christine Emba accepting the Nell Minow Award for Cultural Criticism at the National Press Club in 2024
- Education: Princeton University
- Occupation: Non-fiction writer

Christine Emba is an opinion columnist and author based in Washington DC.

== Biography ==
Emba grew up in Virginia, and graduated with an A.B. from the Princeton School of Public and International Affairs at Princeton University after completing a 103-page-long senior thesis, titled "Financing the United Nations: Withholding, Withdrawal and the U.S.–U.N. Relationship," under the supervision of Helen V. Milner. Emba was raised as an evangelical Christian, but converted to Catholicism during her senior year at Princeton. After graduating, she worked as a strategy analyst at the software corporation SAP, before serving as the deputy editor of the Economist Intelligence Unit and later a Hilton Kramer Fellow in criticism at The New Criterion. In 2015, she joined The Washington Post as an opinion columnist, focusing on "ideas and society". She left the newspaper in 2024. Emba has also appeared in The New York Times as an guest columnist, her most recent article discussing the Cornell 7 case and its relation to societal perceptions of consent.

== Writing on sexual ethics ==
In March 2022, Emba released her book Rethinking Sex: A Provocation, published through Sentinel. The book discusses sexual ethics, focusing on sexual consent, casual sex, and sexual liberation. In the same month, she wrote an opinion essay in The Washington Post titled "Consent is not enough. We need a new sexual ethic", taking excerpts from her book.

In Rethinking Sex, Emba argues that the increased access to casual sex in our modern, sexually liberated society has left people—particularly women, but also men—feeling unhappy and unsatisfied. She criticizes the idea that sex can be meaningless, and further argues that sexual partnerships have been commodified through online dating applications and that women have been dehumanized through the normalization of sexual choking and anal sex in pornography, leading to a bleak romantic landscape. Emba states that while consent in sex is necessary, it is not enough; since even consensual sex can leave people feeling unhappy, she argues, consent cannot be "the only rule".

Instead, she argues that we need a "new sexual ethic" that goes beyond consent. Borrowing from the work of Saint Thomas Aquinas (originally Aristotle), Emba advocates that in sex we should "will the good of the other": "Willing the good means caring enough about another person to consider how your actions might affect them – and then choosing not to act if the outcome would be negative. It's mutual concern – thinking about someone other than yourself and then working so their experience is as good as you hope yours to be." In this frame, there would be circumstances in which sex would be consensual, but nevertheless unethical and best avoided.

=== Reception ===
Michelle Goldberg wrote in The New York Times that Emba's book was "bold and compelling even when I disagreed with it". In the progressive Christian magazine Sojourners, Jennifer Martin praised Emba's identification of the problems in modern dating and her advocacy for a sexual ethic based on mutual goodwill, but criticized the book for "reiterating gender roles and differences, decrying kink culture and casual sex, and attaching the values of purity to our sexual encounters". Martin, as well as Anna Iovine of Mashable, was also critical of the fact Emba's book only discussed the sex of cisgender heterosexuals. Iovine wrote in Mashable that Emba "doesn't discuss queer or trans casual sex at all. As a bi woman, that leaves out a significant chunk of my experiences and that of others." In a review for the Chicago Review of Books, Ben Clarke wrote that while Emba deserves credit for the issues in sex and consent that she raised, she deserves less credit for her solutions: "there is an urgent need for a rigorous, nuanced feminist analysis of the problems she identifies. This is not it."
