= Zerina Akers =

American fashion stylist and costume designer

- Born: April 12, 1986 (age 40); Landover, Maryland, U.S.
- Education: The Art Institute of Philadelphia; LIM College
- Occupations: Fashion stylist; costume designer
- Notable work: Black Is King
- Website: https://www.zerinaakers.com/

Zerina Akers is an American fashion stylist and costume designer. She is best known for her positions as Beyoncé's personal stylist, costume designer for the Emmy-winning 2020 musical film Black Is King, and founder of the e-commerce site "Black Owned Everything". Recognition of her work has appeared in Vogue and Harper's Bazaar.

== Early life ==
Akers was born in Landover, Maryland. Akers first gained an interest in fashion when designing clothes for high school fashion shows.

== Career ==
Akers studied for two years at The Art Institute of Philadelphia, and began her career in the fashion industry as an intern at W Magazine in 2006. During her time as an intern, she worked amongst names such as Alex White, Karl Temper and Shiona Turini. She then moved to New York and completed her studies at LIM College. During her time at LIM College, Akers studied abroad at the University of Westminster, completed an internship with Stella McCartney, and freelanced at W Magazine and Women's Wear Daily. She went on to assist stylists such as Lori Goldstein and Camilla Nickerson on television commercials and fashion editorials. In 2011, she began work at Brooks Brothers, coordinating and styling catalog shoots.

Akers noticed the possibility for a career in the entertainment world after assisting Bea Kerlund on a shoot with Beyoncé. She started styling Beyoncé's Instagram editorials in 2014. She styled Beyoncé's "Formation" music video in 2016, when she wore a wide-brimmed black hat. [8] Akers continued to collaborate with Beyoncé on projects in 2018, styling the "Apeshit" music video, the On The Run II Tour, and the Global Citizen Festival: Mandela 100 concert. [8] Akers has styled director Ava DuVernay, actress Yara Shahidi, and R&B duet Chloe x Halle in addition to being Beyoncé's personal stylist and wardrobe curator.

In 2020, Akers received widespread critical acclaim for her work as costume designer on Black Is King, a musical film and visual album by Beyoncé. The costumes in the film were intended to celebrate the culture, traditions and history of black people, both in Africa and the diaspora. Akers styled Beyoncé in more than 75 costumes for the film, working together with both global brands and young black designers. For her work on the film, Akers won Best Styling in a Video at the 2020 UK Music Video Awards, and Stylist of the Year at the 2020 Essence Best In Black Fashion Awards. Akers was also included in The Hollywood Reporter's 2021 "Hollywood's Most Powerful Stylists" list, and Insider's "Luminaries" list, celebrating "25 women pushing boundaries and accomplishing extraordinary feats".

Following the George Floyd protests and the resurgence of Black Lives Matter in 2020, Akers launched the Instagram account "Black Owned Everything". The account was created to highlight emerging black-owned business in industries such as fashion, beauty, food, and home goods. Akers inspired many other black owned communities to start businesses. Akers is an inspiration and an achiever that is looked up upon. After the account grew in popularity, in February 2021, Akers turned it into an e-commerce site. The "Black Owned Everything" marketplace features black-owned brands and designers, and its launch coincided with a three-month pop-up store in Los Angeles. Additionally, Akers launched the Akers and Akers Foundation, a nonprofit organization that incubates emerging designers and implements financial literacy programs in the community. Together with actor, writer and producer Lena Waithe, Akers took part in Adobe's "Create Change: Conversations with Creators" series, which focused on utilizing creativity to make impactful change, especially amid 2020's social and cultural climate. In 2021, Akers styled Macy's Icons of Style campaign and Zales' Mother's Day campaign.

== Awards and nominations ==
Year	Ceremony	Award	Result	Ref
2021	73rd Primetime Creative Arts Emmy Awards	Primetime Emmy Award for Outstanding Costumes for a Variety, Nonfiction, or Reality Programming (Black Is King)	Won	
