= The Lion King: The Gift =

- Standard edition cover. Deluxe edition features a golden background.

Soundtrack album by Beyoncé and various artists
- Released: July 19, 2019
- Recorded: 2019
- Studio: NRG Recording (Los Angeles)
- Genres: Afrobeats; pop; hip-hop; R&B
- Length: 54:00
- Labels: Parkwood; Columbia
- Producers: Beyoncé; Anatii; Baby Keem; Bubele Boii; Danja; DJ Khaled; DJ Lag; Diplo; Ilya; Just Blaze; Labrinth; Sarz; Magwenzi; Moses Boyd; Nicky Davey; Northboi Oracle; P2J; Picard Brothers; Sounwave; Tim Suby

Beyoncé chronology
Homecoming: The Live Album (2019)	The Lion King: The Gift (2019)	Renaissance (2022)

Singles from The Lion King: The Gift
- 1. "Spirit" Released: July 10, 2019; 2. "Brown Skin Girl" Released: July 23, 2019; 3. "Black Parade" Released: June 19, 2020

The Lion King: The Gift (often referred to as simply The Gift) is a soundtrack album created by American singer Beyoncé from Disney's 2019 remake of The Lion King and for Black Is King (2020). It was released on July 19, 2019, by Parkwood Entertainment and Columbia Records. The album was also produced by Beyoncé and lead artists such as Wizkid, Burna Boy, Mr Eazi, Tiwa Savage, Tekno, Yemi Alade, Busiswa, Moonchild Sanelly, and Salatiel, as well as appearances from Jay-Z, Blue Ivy Carter, Childish Gambino, Pharrell Williams, Kendrick Lamar, Tierra Whack, 070 Shake, and Jessie Reyez, among others.

== Background and release ==
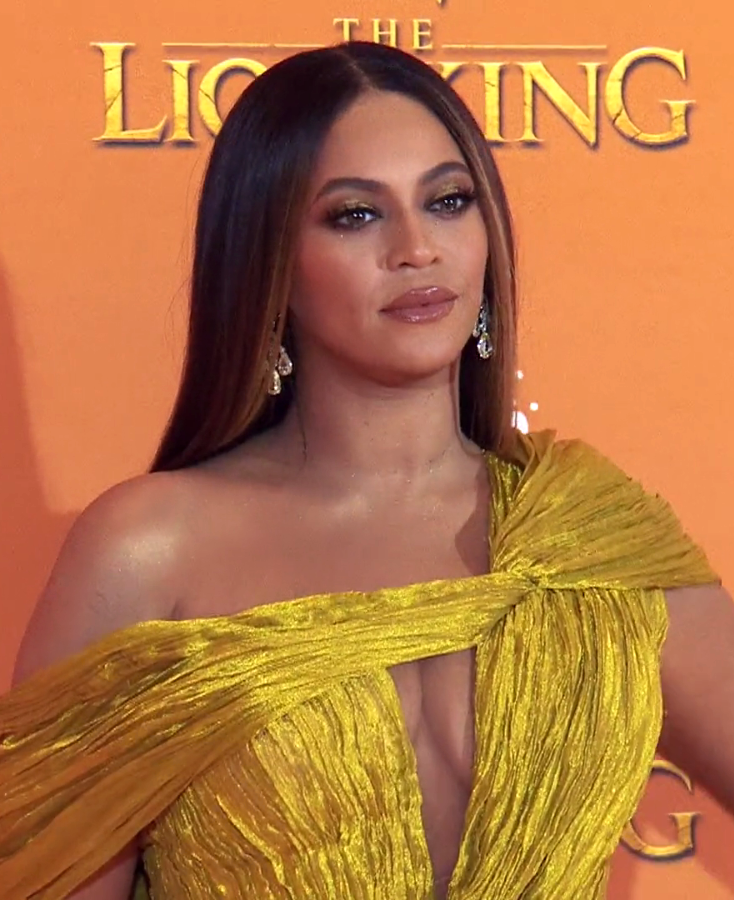
Beyoncé at The Lion King European Premiere, 2019

On July 9, 2019, it was revealed that Beyoncé produced and curated an album titled The Lion King: The Gift, which features new songs inspired by the film, as well as "Spirit" from the soundtrack.

Beyoncé called the album "sonic cinema" and said that the film "is a new experience of storytelling", and that the album "is influenced by everything from R&B, pop, hip-hop, gqom and afrobeats". Beyoncé also said that "[she] wanted to put everyone on their own journey to link the storyline" and that the songs were inspired by the remake's storyline, which "gives the listener a chance to imagine their own imagery, while listening to a new contemporary interpretation". The songs were also produced by African producers, which Beyoncé said was because "authenticity and heart were important to [her]", since the film is set in Africa.

The tracklist was revealed through Beyoncé's official website on July 16, 2019.

On September 16, 2019, Beyoncé released a behind-the-scenes TV special, titled Beyoncé Presents: Making the Gift, documenting the album's creation and her journey through Africa, shot in Egypt, Ghana, Nigeria, South Africa, and United States. The documentary was aired on ABC. It was written, directed and produced by Beyoncé alongside co-director Ed Burke, with executive producers Steve Pamon and Erinn Williams.

== Critical reception ==
Professional ratings
Aggregate scores
Source	Rating
Metacritic	77/100
Review scores
Source	Rating
AllMusic	3.5/5 stars
Consequence of Sound	B−
The Daily Telegraph	4/5 stars
Entertainment Weekly	B−
The Guardian	3/5 stars
HipHopDX	4.3/5
NME	3/5 stars
Pitchfork	7.3/10
Rolling Stone	3.5/5 stars
Variety	8.4/10

At Metacritic, which assigns a normalized rating out of 100 to reviews from mainstream publications, the album received a weighted average score of 77, based on 13 reviews, indicating "generally favorable reviews".

Writing for AllMusic, Neil Z. Yeung describes the album as "a buoyant hybrid of futuristic, cross-Atlantic Afro-pop", adding that the "expertly curated collection is an artistic showcase celebrating Africa and Black musical traditions, elevating the movie experience with strategic thematic interludes that could help this album endure far longer than the film." The Lion King: The Gift was chosen as The New York Times's Critic's Pick, with Jon Pareles writing that "Beyoncé flexes both her musicianship and her cultural leverage... It's her latest lesson in commandeering mass-market expectations, as she bends The Lion King to her own agenda of African-diaspora unity, self-worth, parental responsibility and righteous ambition." A.D. Amorosi for Variety praises the album as "a wild, wonderful offering dedicated to sounds and soul of the motherland", calling it an "offering to the idea of bringing connection to those who never realized such was possible, maintaining heritage in the face of aborted and abbreviated histories".

Describing it as an album "that ably displays [Beyoncé's] excellent taste, rather than a great Beyoncé album per se," Alexis Petridis of The Guardian writes that The Lion King: The Gift gives "the dominant Afrobeats sound a vast new level of exposure – an impressive feat in itself". "Beyoncé's Lion King album is the event the movie wishes it could be," writes Carl Wilson of Slate, arguing that The Gift "works best if you forget the remake even exists" and encouraging listeners to "take it more as a (mildly) new perspective on Beyoncé" since thematically the album "transliterates the leonine royal-family drama and 'circle of life' worldview of [the movie] into the recent main leitmotif of Beyoncé's own work." "An ambitious companion album that says more than the movie does about family and tradition and responsibility and Africa", writes Mikael Wood of Los Angeles Times. "No one takes possession of a cultural space like Beyoncé. We saw it happen in 2016 when she easily outshone Coldplay during its own Super Bowl halftime performance. We saw it happen last year when she remade the world's most prestigious music festival as Beychella. Now we’re seeing it again with Disney's new version of The Lion King".

Michelle Kim for Pitchfork opines that the album "succeeds in introducing a whole new musical universe to the average American listener". Writing for The Telegraph, Neil McCormick says, "The Gift is a quixotic compilation of tracks", calling the album a "tipping point" for African artists worldwide. Bernadette Giacomazzo of HipHopDX also praised the album, saying that the album "trips the black fantastic" and that many songs were capable of standing independent of the film. Drawing comparisons to the Black Panther soundtrack "down to the Kendrick Lamar appearance," Giacomazzo says that the album is "one of the first Beyoncé albums—such as it were—in which Mrs. Carter's creativity serves as a vector to another creative vision, rather than as the creative vision itself. Overall, it works and is another jewel in her crown — one that she, overall, can be proud to call hers".

== Accolades ==
At the 2019 Soul Train Music Awards, "Spirit" was nominated for Best Video of the Year and Best Dance Performance, while "Brown Skin Girl" was nominated for Best Collaboration and The Ashford & Simpson Songwriter's Award, winning the latter. The Lion King: The Gift was nominated for Best Pop Vocal Album at the 62nd Annual Grammy Awards while "Spirit" received two nominations: for Best Pop Solo Performance and Best Song Written for Visual Media. "Brown Skin Girl" went on to win in the Best Music Video category at the 63rd Annual Grammy Awards.

Vibe included The Gift on their list of the 30 best albums of 2019, while The Fader also included the release on their selections of the best albums of the same year. Both City Pages and Fuse included The Gift on their lists of the best albums of 2019, while Brooklyn Vegan listed the soundtrack at number 22 on their ranking of the best rap and R&B albums of the same year. In December 2020, PopMatters named The Lion King: The Gift (Deluxe Edition) the 9th best pop album of 2020.

Award nominations for The Lion King: The Gift
Year	Award	Category	Result	Ref.
2020	62nd Annual Grammy Awards	Best Pop Vocal Album	Nominated	
2020	NAACP Image Awards	Outstanding Soundtrack/Compilation Album	Won	
2021	63rd Annual Grammy Awards	Best Music Film	Nominated	

== Commercial performance ==
The Lion King: The Gift debuted at number two on the US Billboard 200 with 54,000 album-equivalent units, of which 11,000 were pure album sales.

It became Beyoncé's second top 10 debut of 2019 (following Homecoming: The Live Album) and third top 10 album of 2019 (after Lemonade re-entered the Billboard 200 chart following its wide streaming release). It is also the ninth top 10 album of Beyoncé's solo career.

On the Billboard genre charts, The Lion King: The Gift debuted at number one on several charts including Top R&B Albums, Top R&B/Hip-Hop Albums, Top Soundtrack Albums and Top World Albums. It became Beyoncé's seventh number one on the Top R&B/Hip-Hop Albums chart as a solo artist.

Following the release of Black Is King in July 2020, the album re-entered the Billboard 200 at number ten.

== Legacy ==
African musicians and producers who worked on The Lion King: The Gift, amongst others, have spoken about the impact they predict the album will have on African music in the United States. Ghanaian producer GuiltyBeatz said "Now that Beyoncé released a whole album [of African music], this will open the gateway" for those sounds to enter the American market; Nigerian singer Yemi Alade added that the album will be "another awakening". Nigerian producer P2J described how the album is "going to change the face of music", adding that "Brown Skin Girl" is "one of the first songs in my career that I thought was going to be very special... It's a big moment for Africa." South African artist DJ Lag said that the album has "opened doors" for him and that the sound of The Lion King: The Gift is "going to be the next big thing." Bloomberg's Anthony Osae-Brown stated that with The Lion King: The Gift, Beyoncé is taking the "Nigeria music scene global". Director of Urban Music at YouTube Tuma Basa called the release of The Lion King: The Gift "a tipping-point moment", while Nigerian producer E-Kelly said that it "is gonna create a new awareness" and "open a big crack" for Afrobeats to enter American mainstream music.

The track "Brown Skin Girl" inspired a viral trend called "#brownskingirlchallenge", where black women and girls post pictures and videos of themselves in celebration of their skin, as well as people encouraging their young family members to be proud of their skin. Celebrities including Ava DuVernay, Barbara Lee, Gabrielle Union and Lupita Nyong'o participated in the trend. Several thinkpieces and articles were also produced in response to "Brown Skin Girl".

== Beyoncé Presents: Making The Gift ==
On September 15, 2019, it was announced a documentary chronicling the development, production and filming of The Lion King: The Gift, entitled Beyoncé Presents: Making The Gift, would air on ABC September 16. A trailer was released the same day to promote the documentary. Airing nearly two months after the release of the album, Beyoncé Presents: Making The Gift was met with a viewership of 2.49 million.

== Black Is King ==
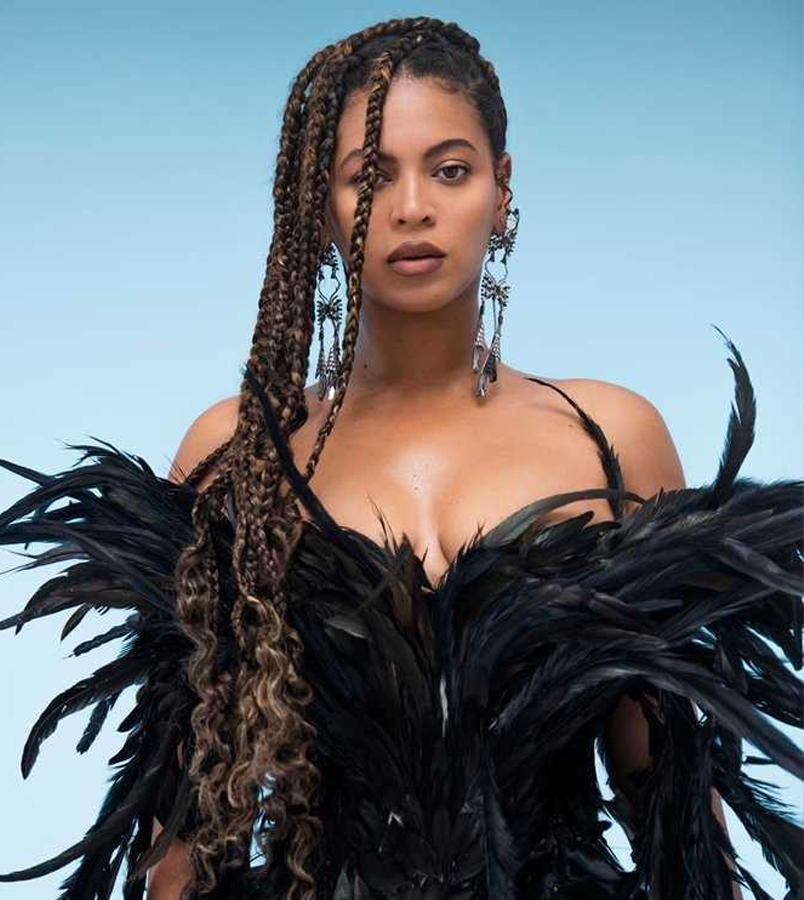
Beyoncé in Black Is King

Black Is King, a musical film and visual album based on the music of The Gift, was released on July 31, 2020, on Disney+. The film – directed, written, and executive produced by Beyoncé – tells the story of a young African prince who is exiled from his kingdom after the death of his father. As he grows up into a man, the prince undergoes a journey of self-identity, using the guidance of his ancestor, childhood love and his own subconscious to reclaim his throne. The prince's journey acts as an allegory for the African diaspora's journey of discovering, reclaiming and celebrating their culture and heritage, which is echoed by the inclusion of spoken-word poetry in the film that focuses on the question of black identity.

Black Is King was in production for over a year and was filmed across three continents. Beyoncé wanted to recruit a diverse cast and crew and to provide opportunities for new talent. The film's music, dances, costumes, hairstyles and sets were designed to showcase the beauty and richness of the cultures in the African continent and diaspora.

The film received universal acclaim from critics, with praise for Beyoncé's direction, the cinematography, score, costume design, subject matter, and cultural themes. At the 63rd Annual Grammy Awards, Black Is King was nominated for Best Music Film, while the "Brown Skin Girl" video won the award for Best Music Video.

== Deluxe edition ==
On July 31, 2020, alongside the release of Black Is King, Beyoncé released a deluxe edition of the album. The album includes all the tracks included in the film in addition to three new tracks, excluding the interludes. This includes the standard and extended versions of "Black Parade", which was released on June 19; the extended version of the song was only available on Tidal up until the album's release. The other track included is a remix of "Find Your Way Back" by MeLo-X.

== Track listing ==
Credits adapted from Beyoncé's website. All tracks were produced by Beyoncé and Derek Dixie, except where noted.

=== Standard Edition ===
No.	Title	Writer(s)	Producer(s)	Length
1.	"Balance (Mufasa Interlude)" (James Earl Jones)	Jeff Nathanson		0:43
2.	"Bigger" (Beyoncé)	Beyoncé; Dixie; Stacy Barthe; Rachel Keen; Akil King; Ricky Lawson		3:46
3.	"The Stars (Mufasa Interlude)" (James Earl Jones)	Nathanson		0:46
4.	"Find Your Way Back" (Beyoncé)	Beyoncé; Brittany Hazzard; Bubele Booi; Robert Magwenzi; Bankulli; Niniola Apata; Osabuohien Osaretin	Beyoncé; Bubele Boii; Magwenzi; Dixie^{[b]}; Guilty Beatz^{[b]}	2:42
5.	"Uncle Scar (Scar Interlude)" (performed by Chiwetel Ejiofor)	Nathanson		0:13
6.	"Don't Jealous Me" (Tekno, Lord Afrixana, Yemi Alade and Mr Eazi)	Beyoncé; Augustine Kelechukwu; Nana Afriyie; Yemi Alade; Oluwatosin Ajibade; Ariowa Irosogie	Beyoncé; P2J; Dixie^{[b]}	2:35
7.	"Danger (Young Simba & Young Nala Interlude)" (JD McCrary and Shahadi Wright Joseph)	Nathanson		0:16
8.	"Ja Ara E" (Burna Boy)	Damini Ogulu; Richard Isong	Beyoncé; P2J; Dixie^{[b]}	3:10
9.	"Run Away (Scar & Young Simba Interlude)" (JD McCrary and Chiwetel Ejiofor)	Nathanson		0:29
10.	"Nile" (Beyoncé and Kendrick Lamar)	Beyoncé; Kendrick Duckworth; Mark Spears; Hykeem Carter Jr.; Keanu Torres; Denisia Andrews; Brittany Coney	Beyoncé; Sounwave; Johnny Kosich; Baby Keem; Keanu Beats	1:47
11.	"New Lesson (Timon, Pumbaa & Young Simba Interlude)" (Billy Eichner, Seth Rogen and JD McCrary)	Nathanson		0:53
12.	"Mood 4 Eva" (Beyoncé, Jay-Z and Childish Gambino featuring Oumou Sangaré)	Beyoncé; Andrews; Coney; Donald Glover; Khaled Khaled; Floyd Hills; Shawn Carter; Anathi Mnyango; Ant Clemons; Michael Uzowuru; Teo Halm; Jeff Kleinman; Jimmy Seals; James Brown	Beyoncé; DJ Khaled; Danja; Just Blaze^{[d]}; Jeff Kleinman^{[b]}; Michael Uzowuru^{[b]}; Teo Halm^{[b]}	4:32
13.	"Reunited (Nala & Simba Interlude)" (Beyoncé and Donald Glover)	Nathanson		0:09
14.	"Water" (Salatiel, Pharrell and Beyoncé)	Beyoncé; Afriyie; Nija Charles; Richard Isong	Beyoncé; P2J	2:32
15.	"Brown Skin Girl" (Beyoncé, Blue Ivy Carter, Saint Jhn and Wizkid)	Beyoncé; Carlos St. John; Adio Marchant; S. Carter; Barthe; Anathi Mnyango; Michael Uzowuru; Isong	Beyoncé; P2J; Dixie^{[b]}	4:08
16.	"Come Home (Nala Interlude)" (Beyonce)	Nathanson		0:14
17.	"Keys to the Kingdom" (Tiwa Savage and Mr Eazi)	Beyoncé; Kim Krysiuk; Rickie Tice; Akil King; Tiwatope Savage; Dixie; Gerald White; Irosogie; Rich King; Ajibade; Ronald Banful; Isong	Beyoncé; Northboi Oracle; GuiltyBeatz^{[a]}; P2J^{[a]}; Dixie^{[a]}	3:18
18.	"Follow Me (Rafiki Interlude)" (Donald Glover and John Kani)	Nathanson		0:31
19.	"Already" (Beyoncé, Shatta Wale and Major Lazer)	Beyoncé; Hazzard; Toumani Diabaté; Clément Picard; Maxime Picard; Thomas Wesley; Charles Mensah; Banful	Beyoncé; Diplo; Picard Brothers; Guilty Beatz^{[a]}	3:42
20.	"Remember (Mufasa Interlude)" (James Earl Jones)	Nathanson		0:45
21.	"Otherside" (Beyoncé)	Beyoncé; Sydney Bennett; Dave Rosser; Nick Green; Abisagboola Oluseun	Beyoncé; Nicky Davey; Syd^{[b]}; Dixie^{[b]}	3:39
22.	"War (Nala Interlude)" (Beyoncé)	Nathanson		0:18
23.	"My Power" (Beyoncé, Nija, Busiswa, Yemi Alade, Tierra Whack, Moonchild Sanelly and DJ Lag)	Beyoncé; Busiswa Gqulu; Alade; Sanelisiwe Twisha; Charles; Andrews; Coney; Lwazi Gwala	Beyoncé; DJ Lag; Moses Boyd	4:19
24.	"Surrender (Simba & Scar Interlude)" (Donald Glover and Chiwetel Ejiofor)	Nathanson		0:14
25.	"Scar" (070 Shake and Jessie Reyez)	Beyoncé; Danielle Balbuena; Teo Halm; Dave Hamelin; Jessie Reyez; Isong; Irosogie	Beyoncé; P2J; Tim Suby; Hamelin; Ari PenSmith^{[a]}; Dixie^{[b]}; Mike Dean^{[b]}	3:06
26.	"I'm Home (Mufasa, Sarabi & Simba Interlude)" (performed by James Earl Jones, Alfre Woodard and Donald Glover)	Nathanson		0:43
27.	"Spirit" (performed by Beyoncé)	Beyoncé; Timothy McKenzie; Ilya Salmanzadeh	Beyoncé; Labrinth; Ilya; Dixie^{[b]}	4:33
Total length:				54:00

=== Deluxe Edition ===
No.	Title	Lyrics	Music	Producer(s)	Length
1.	"Bigger" (performed by Beyoncé)	Stacy Barthe; Rachel Keen; Akil King; Ricky Lawson	Beyoncé; Dixie	Beyoncé; Dixie^{[b]}	3:46
2.	"Find Your Way Back" (performed by Beyoncé)	Brittany Hazzard; Bankulli; Niniola Apata; Osabuohien Osaretin	Beyoncé; Bubele Boii; Robert Magwenzi	Beyoncé; Bubele Boii; Magwenzi; Dixie^{[b]}; Guilty Beatz^{[b]}	2:42
3.	"Don't Jealous Me" (performed by Tekno, Lord Afrixana, Yemi Alade and Mr Eazi)	Augustine Kelechukwu; Nana Afriyie; Yemi Alade; Oluwatosin Ajibade; Ariowa Irosogie	Beyoncé; P2J; Dixie	Beyoncé; P2J; Dixie^{[b]}	2:36
4.	"Ja Ara E" (performed by Burna Boy)	Damini Ogulu	Richard Isong	Beyoncé; P2J; Dixie^{[b]}	3:10
5.	"Nile" (performed by Beyoncé and Kendrick Lamar)	Denisia Andrews; Brittany Coney; Kendrick Duckworth	Mark Spears; Hykeem Carter Jr.; Keanu Torres	Beyoncé; Sounwave; Johnny Kosich; Baby Keem; Keanu Beats	1:47
6.	"Mood 4 Eva" (performed by Beyoncé, Jay-Z and Childish Gambino featuring Oumou Sangaré)	Beyoncé; Andrews; Coney; Donald Glover; Shawn Carter; Anathi Mnyango; Ant Clemons	Khaled Khaled; Floyd Hills; Michael Uzowuru; Teo Halm; Jeff Kleinman; Jimmy Seals; James Brown	Beyoncé; DJ Khaled; Danja; Just Blaze^{[d]}; Jeff Kleinman^{[b]}; Michael Uzowuru^{[b]}; Teo Halm^{[b]}	4:32
7.	"Water" (performed by Salatiel, Pharrell and Beyoncé)	Afriyie; Nija Charles	Richard Isong	Beyoncé; P2J	2:33
8.	"Brown Skin Girl" (performed by Beyoncé, Saint Jhn and Wizkid featuring Blue Ivy Carter)	Beyoncé; Carlos St. John; S. Carter; Barthe; Anathi Mnyango; Ayodeji Balogun	John; Michael Uzowuru; Isong; Adio Marchant	Beyoncé; P2J; Dixie^{[b]}	4:08
9.	"Keys to the Kingdom" (performed by Tiwa Savage and Mr Eazi)	Kim Krysiuk; A. King; Tiwatope Savage; Irosogie; Ajibade	Gerald White; Rich King; Rickie Tice; Ronald Banful; Isong	Beyoncé; Northboi Oracle; GuiltyBeatz^{[a]}; P2J^{[a]}; Dixie^{[a]}	3:19
10.	"Already" (performed by Beyoncé, Shatta Wale and Major Lazer)	Beyoncé; Hazzard; Toumani Diabaté; Charles Mensah	Beyoncé; Clément Picard; Maxime Picard; Thomas Wesley; Banful	Beyoncé; Diplo; Picard Brothers; Guilty Beatz^{[a]}	3:43
11.	"Otherside" (performed by Beyoncé)	Beyoncé; Sydney Bennett; Bankulli	Syd; Dave Rosser; Nick Green	Beyoncé; Nicky Davey; Syd^{[b]}; Dixie^{[b]}	3:40
12.	"My Power" (performed by Beyoncé, Nija, Busiswa, Yemi Alade, Tierra Whack, Moonchild Sanelly and DJ Lag)	Beyoncé; Busiswa Gqulu; Alade; Sanelisiwe Twisha; Charles; Andrews; Coney; Lwazi Gwala	Beyoncé; DJ Lag; Moses Boyd	Beyoncé; DJ Lag; Moses Boyd	4:20
13.	"Scar" (performed by 070 Shake and Jessie Reyez)	Danielle Balbuena; Dave Hamelin; Jessie Reyez; Irosogie	Beyoncé; Isong; Teo Halm	Beyoncé; P2J; Tim Suby; Hamelin; Ari PenSmith^{[a]}; Dixie^{[b]}; Mike Dean^{[b]}	3:07
14.	"Spirit" (performed by Beyoncé)	Beyoncé; Timothy McKenzie	Beyoncé; Labrinth; Ilya Salmanzadeh	Beyoncé; Labrinth; Ilya; Dixie^{[b]}	4:37
15.	"Black Parade" (extended version; performed by Beyoncé)	Beyoncé; King; Coney; Andrews; Krysiuk; Carter	Beyoncé; Dixie; Tice	Beyoncé; Dixie^{[b]}	5:16
16.	"Find Your Way Back" (MeLo-X remix; performed by Beyoncé)	Hazzard; Bankulli; Apata; Osaretin	Beyoncé; MeLo-X; Booi; Magwenzi	MeLo-X	3:36
17.	"Black Parade" (performed by Beyoncé)	Beyoncé; King; Coney; Andrews; Krysiuk; Carter	Beyoncé; Dixie; Tice	Beyoncé; Dixie^{[b]}	4:41
Total length:					61:33

Notes

- ^{^[a]} signifies a co-producer
- ^{^[b]} signifies an additional producer
- ^{^[c]} signifies an uncredited additional producer
- ^{^[d]} signifies a producer credited on the extended version of the song
- All song titles are stylized in all caps
- All interlude titles are stylized in all lowercase
- "Bigger" features vocals by Raye
- "Spirit" features background vocals by Labrinth, Ilya, Jamal Moore, Maurice Smith, J Rome, Derrick Charles, DeP, George Young, Vernon Burris, TJ Wilkins, Andre Washington, Mabvuto Carpenter, Jason Morales, Johnny Gilmore, Stevie Notes, Marcus Eldridge, Edward Lawson, and Steve Epting

=== Sample credits ===
- "Find Your Way Back" contains elements of "Maradona", written by Sarz and performed by Niniola.
- "Mood 4 Eva" contains elements of "Diaraby Nene" written and performed by Oumou Sangaré; contains an interpolation of "Sweet Green Fields" written by Jimmy Seals; contains an interpolation of "(Think) About It" written by James Brown.

== Personnel ==
Credits adapted from Beyoncé's official website.

=== Musicians ===
- Beyoncé – vocals
- String section (tracks 1, 2)
  - Adrienne Woods, Bianca McClure, Chelsea Stevens, Crystal Alforque, Jonathan Richards, Marta Honer, Rhea Hosanny, Stephanie Matthews, Stephanie Yu, Tahirah Whittington
- Pino Palladino – bass (track 15)
- Courtney Leonard – bass (track 17)
- Rod Castro – guitar (track 2, 16, 17)
- Ari PenSmith – keyboards (track 25)
- Derek Dixie – drums (track 27)
- Ilya – drums, keyboards, percussion (track 27)
- Labrinth – drums, keyboards, percussion (track 27)
- Jeremy Lertola – percussion (track 27)
- Jeff Lorber – piano (track 27)
- David Fleming – strings (track 27)

=== Production ===
- Beyoncé – executive producer
- Kwasi Fordjour – creative director
- Derek Dixie – music director
- Big Jon Platt – A&R executive
- Teresa LaBarbera Whites – A&R executive
- Steven "Steve-O" Carless – A&R executive

== Charts ==
=== Weekly charts ===
Weekly chart performance for The Lion King: The Gift
Chart (2019–2020)	Peak position
Australian Albums (ARIA)	12
Austrian Albums (Ö3 Austria)	37
Belgian Albums (Ultratop Flanders)	12
Belgian Albums (Ultratop Wallonia)	36
Canadian Albums (Billboard)	4
Danish Albums (Hitlisten)	9
Dutch Albums (Album Top 100)	3
French Albums (SNEP)	28
German Albums (Offizielle Top 100)	48
Italian Albums (FIMI)	39
Latvian Albums (LAIPA)	20
Lithuanian Albums (AGATA)	8
New Zealand Albums (RMNZ)	16
Norwegian Albums (VG-lista)	11
Spanish Albums (PROMUSICAE)	64
Swedish Albums (Sverigetopplistan)	22
Swiss Albums (Schweizer Hitparade)	20
UK Compilation Chart	7
UK R&B Albums (Official Charts)	1
US Billboard 200	2
US Kid Albums (Billboard)	1
US Soundtrack Albums (Billboard)	1
US World Albums (Billboard)	1
US Top R&B/Hip-Hop Albums (Billboard)	1

=== Year-end charts ===
2019 year-end chart performance for The Lion King: The Gift
Chart (2019)	Position
Dutch Albums (Album Top 100)	100
Thai Albums (IFPI)	2
South African Albums (IFPI)	9
US Kid Albums (Billboard)	24
US Soundtrack Albums (Billboard)	18
US World Albums (Billboard)	15

2020 year-end chart performance for The Lion King: The Gift
Chart (2020)	Position
US Kid Albums (Billboard)	25
US Soundtrack Albums (Billboard)	22
US World Albums (Billboard)	5

2021 year-end chart performance for The Lion King: The Gift
Chart (2021)	Position
US Soundtrack Albums (Billboard)	19

== Certifications ==
Certifications for The Lion King: The Gift
Region	Certification	Certified units/sales
Denmark (IFPI Danmark)	Gold	10,000^{‡}
United Kingdom (BPI)	Silver	60,000^{‡}
United States (RIAA)	Gold	500,000^{‡}
^{‡} Sales+streaming figures based on certification alone.

== Release history ==
Release dates and formats for The Lion King: The Gift
Region	Date	Format	Edition	Label	Ref.
Various	July 19, 2019	Digital download; streaming	Standard	Parkwood; Columbia	
Various	July 31, 2020	Digital download; streaming	Deluxe	Parkwood; Columbia	
