= DJ Lag =

South African DJ and record producer

- Also known as: King of Gqom
- Born: Lwazi Asanda Gwala; 1995 or 1996 (age 30–31); Clermont, KwaZulu-Natal, South Africa
- Genres: Gqom; sghubu; 3-step; uthayela
- Occupations: DJ, producer
- Years active: 2012–present
- Labels: Ice Drop; Goon Club Allstars; Hyperdub

Lwazi Asanda Gwala, better known as DJ Lag, is a South African DJ and record producer. He is regarded as one of the pioneers of gqom, a genre of electronic dance music that emerged in the early 2010s in Durban, South Africa. In 2019, DJ Lag notably collaborated with Tierra Whack, Beyoncé, Moonchild Sanelly, Nija, Yemi Alade and Busiswa on a track called "My Power" on Beyoncé's album, The Lion King: The Gift.

== Early life ==
With aspirations of becoming a soccer player growing up in Durban, Lag suffered an ankle injury which derailed his pursuits. His cousin, a rapper within the Durban hip hop scene at the time, then introduced him to FL Studio, on which he taught himself to produce. Following this, he began to explore DJing. He went on to play his first gig at Durban's club Uhuru during a high school graduation event while he was in 10th grade. Gwala completed his matric at Wyebank Secondary School located in Wyebank, KwaZulu-Natal.

== Career ==
Releasing his first EP on WhatsApp, DJ Lag began his career using methods unorthodox to Western distribution methods common in gqom's formative years. Fans signed up on the DJ's website with the promise that an exclusive EP would be delivered to them via the mobile messaging app free of charge. DJ Lag's specific style is known to be focused on what local producers dubbed "uthayela" (an isiZulu word for "corrugated iron") which describes the rough timbre and hard bass-lines specifically made for listening to in club settings.

In late 2016 at the age of 21, DJ Lag made his live global debut at the Unsound Festival in Poland and finishing up at Seoul's Cake Shop nearly a month later. Since then, he has performed at Afropunk New York City and secured a residency at RinseFM. He also embarked on a four-part worldwide tour called #GqomIsThePresent and was featured on BBC Radio 1, including shows by Diplo and Benji B, with a BBC Radio 1 Essential Mix set hosted by Pete Tong. DJ Lag was a featured speaker at the 2019 Amsterdam Dance Event (ADE).

In 2019, he released a 6-track EP entitled UHURU under Diplo's American record label, Good Enuff Records, under the Mad Decent umbrella. This album paid homage to DJ Lag's hometown club of the same name, which acted as a monumental meeting place for gqom producers such as Rudeboyz and Naked Boyz, to try out new techniques on larger audiences. In 2019, DJ Lag began to curate and host his own event, called Something for Clermont where new acts were encouraged to experiment with sounds contributing to the evolution of the genre, the first of which was held in partnership with music broadcaster Boiler Room.

== Collaborations ==
=== "My Power" from Beyonce's The Lion King: The Gift ===
DJ Lag co-produced a track that was initially released as "Drumming" alongside percussionist Moses Boyd, which was later chosen by Beyonce to form part of the collaborative album The Lion King: The Gift, which featured Tierra Whack, Busiswa, Yemi Alade and Moonchild Sanelly.

=== "Anywhere We Go" with Shekhinah ===
DJ Lag and Shekhinah collaborated on "Anywhere We Go". The accompanying visuals feature dancer Thami Njoko, and was directed by music video director Kyle Lewis.

=== "Going Modd" with Epic B ===
DJ Lag worked with New York Flex Dance Music pioneer Epic B on the track "Going Modd" on UK label Swing Ting.

=== "Switz" music video with choreographer Mette Towley ===
Mette Towley, who also appeared in the music video for N.E.R.D. and Rihanna's "Lemon", approached DJ Lag to work on "Switz" in 2019. Shot and directed in New York by Bon Duke, Towley's interpretation of the track is "her response to the feeling that dance, and its ability to act as a mode of communication, needed a serious revisit."

Dancers included Orlando Zane, Hunter Jr., Emily Paige, Frankie Gordils "Francoth3artist", Rudy Legros, Shari Clarke, Ros Hayes, Leal Zielinksa, Ekow Nunoo, Brown Kato, Watz Hunter and Valentine Nicholi White.

=== Steam Rooms with Okzharp ===
Steam Rooms, which takes its name from the local nickname for dance clubs in Durban, features South African rhythms with a blend of UK club styles brought on by producer Okzharp, creating a musical dialogue between the two regions' styles.

== Selected discography ==
=== EPs and singles ===
- 2016: DJ Lag 12" EP (Goon Club Allstars)
- 2016: Ice Drop EP (Goon Club Allstars)
- 2017: Trip to New York (Black Major) – originally via WhatsApp
- 2018: Jika single with DJ Vumar and Biggie (Ice Drop Records)
- 2018: 3 Step Culo single (Goon Club Allstars)
- 2018: Stampit 12" EP (Goon Club Allstars)
- 2018: Going Modd ft Epic B (Swing Ting Records)
- 2019: Nyusa single with Okzharp (Hyperdub)
- 2019: Steam Rooms with Okzharp 12" EP (Hyperdub)
- 2019: Uhuru EP (Good Enuff)
- 2019: Anywhere We Go single with Shekhinah (Parametric Records)

=== Collaborations ===
- 2018: The Originators by various artists limited edition vinyl 12" split – "Daisies" by DJ Lag (Gqom Oh!)
- 2019: WKC012 by Dmtrs We Flaco limited edition 7" single – "Imaginary Drumming" by Heviweit and DJ Lag (self-released)
- 2019: The Lion King: The Gift by Beyoncé – "My Power" by Tierra Whack, Beyoncé, Moonchild Sanelly, Nija, DJ Lag, Yemi Alade, Busiswa (Parkwood Entertainment LLC, Columbia, Sony Music Entertainment)

=== Remixes ===
- 2018: "Down Low – DJ Lag Remix Extended, Weird Together feat. Moonchild Sanelly"
