= Black Parade (song) =

Single by Beyoncé

from the album The Lion King: The Gift
- Released: June 19, 2020
- Studio: NRG Recording Studios (Los Angeles, CA)
- Genre: Pop; trap; hip-hop; electronica
- Length: 4:41 (original version); 4:57 (extended a capella version); 5:16 (extended version)
- Label: Parkwood; Columbia
- Songwriters: Beyoncé Knowles-Carter; Derek James Dixie; Akil King; Brittany Coney; Denisia Andrews; Kimberly Krysiuk; Rickie Tice; Shawn Carter; Paramount on Parade
- Producers: Beyoncé; Derek Dixie

Beyoncé singles chronology
"Savage (Remix)" (2020)	"Black Parade" (2020)	"Be Alive" (2021)

Audio video
- "Black Parade" on YouTube

"Black Parade" is a song by American singer Beyoncé. It was produced by Beyoncé and Derek Dixie in the wake of the murder of George Floyd and the protests that followed it. The song was surprise released on June 19, 2020, also referred to as Juneteenth, a day commemorating the abolishment of slavery in the United States. The song serves as a celebration of Black culture and the support of Black activism. While initially a stand-alone single, an extended version of the song was used in the end credits of Beyoncé's film Black Is King and included in the accompanying deluxe edition of The Lion King: The Gift, both released on July 31, 2020.

"Black Parade" received critical acclaim upon release, with praise for its lyrical references to black history, culture, pride and activism, as well as for Beyoncé's vocal performance. Critics noted the track's ability to act as a condemnation of racism and a call to action for protestors against police brutality, while also serving as an uplifting celebration of black culture. The release of the song caused a significant rise in sales for several black-owned small businesses. It was the most nominated song at the 63rd Annual Grammy Awards, with four nominations, including Record of the Year and Song of the Year. The song won Best R&B Performance, which was Beyoncé's 28th Grammy win, making her the most awarded singer and female artist in Grammy history.

== Background and production ==
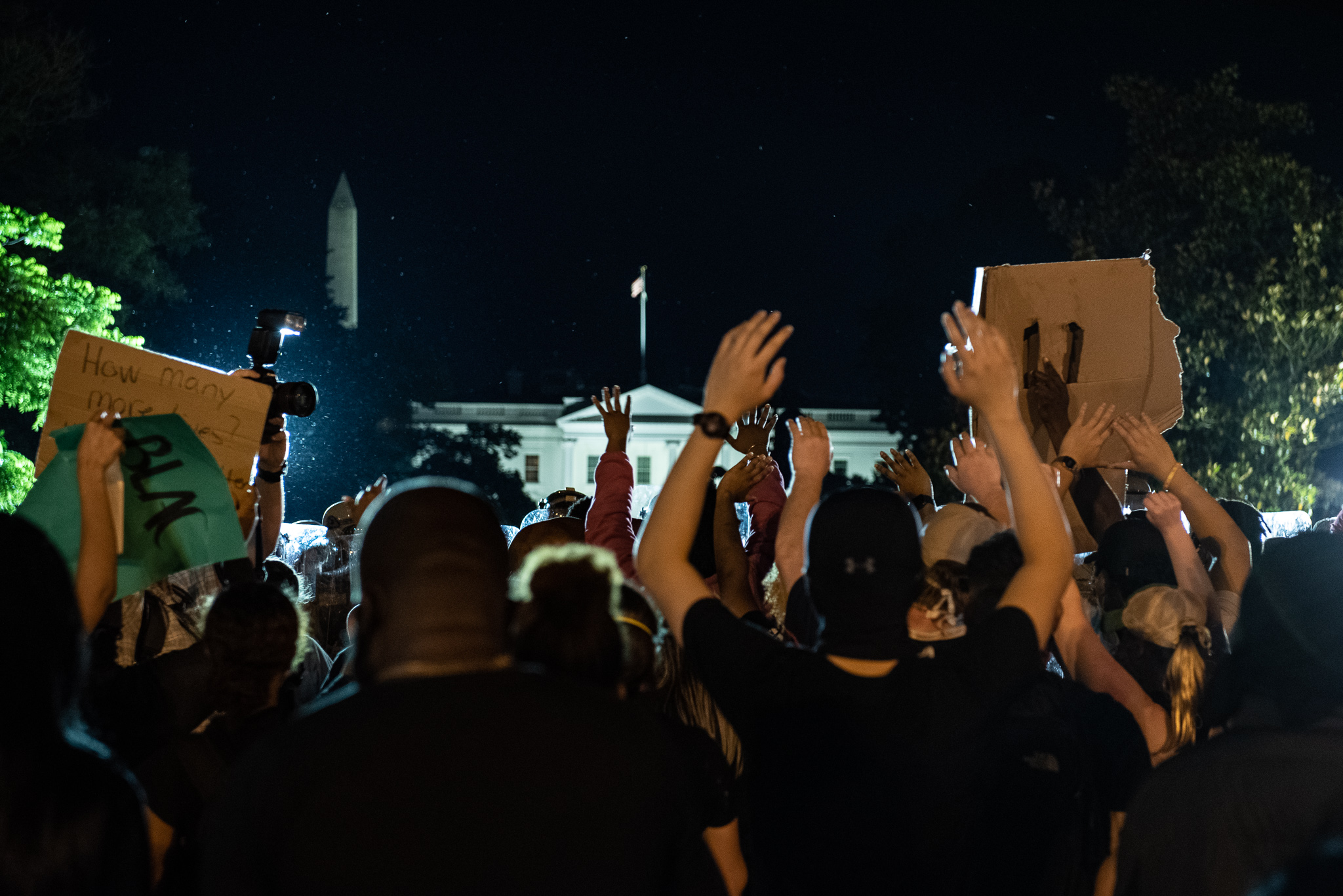
"Black Parade" was inspired by the George Floyd protests and other 2020 protests against systemic racism.

Prior to the 2020 Black Lives Matter protests, Beyoncé had repeatedly used her platform to raise her voice against racial inequality. A few days after the murder of George Floyd, Beyoncé took to social media to urge fans and followers to sign the petition "Justice for George Floyd". On June 14, 2020, she issued an open letter to Kentucky Attorney General Daniel Cameron, calling out the lack of arrests in the case of Breonna Taylor, an unarmed Black woman who was fatally shot by police while sleeping in her own home in March 2020. Beyoncé urged Cameron to "take swift and decisive action in charging the officers".

Mesfin Fekadu of the Associated Press wrote that after these events, "the world was driven to... this year's Juneteenth more than ever before, and Beyoncé... wanted to release a song on that momentous day". Co-writer and co-producer Derek Dixie explained his intention behind the song, writing: "'Black Parade' exists to give a... boost to a community that has been fighting for... equal rights... for centuries. 'Black Parade' exists to give black people a reminder that their excellence goes beyond the stolen culture..." Dixie noted that they could have delayed the release of the song in order to release it together with Beyoncé's visual album and film Black Is King on July 31 in order to capitalize off of it, however they "really wanted to get it out during a time where we could all remember the feeling and the energy".

During her acceptance speech for the 2021 Grammy Award for Best R&B Performance, Beyoncé elaborated on the background of the track:

"As an artist, I believe it's my job and all of our jobs to reflect the times. It's been such a difficult time so I wanted to uplift, encourage, celebrate the beautiful Black queens and kings that continue to inspire me and inspire the whole world."

== Release and promotion ==
The song was released on June 19, 2020, through Parkwood and Columbia Records. It marked the 155th anniversary of Juneteenth, the holiday celebrating the emancipation of those who had been enslaved in the United States and which originated in Beyoncé's home state of Texas. Upon announcing the release of the single on Instagram, Beyoncé wrote: "Happy Juneteenth Weekend! I hope we continue to... celebrate each other, even in the midst of struggle. Please continue to remember our beauty, strength and power. 'BLACK PARADE' celebrates... your voice and... will benefit Black-owned small businesses."

All proceeds from the song benefit the BeyGOOD Black Business Impact Fund, a fund established by Beyoncé that supports black-owned small businesses in need. As of December 31, 2020, the fund had given 715 grants to black-owned small businesses, amounting to $7.15 million donated. Together with the song, Beyoncé launched the "Black Parade Route" initiative that highlights black-owned businesses and creatives.

The song was used in the end credits of Black Is King and included in the accompanying deluxe edition of The Lion King: The Gift, both released on July 31, 2020.

== Composition ==
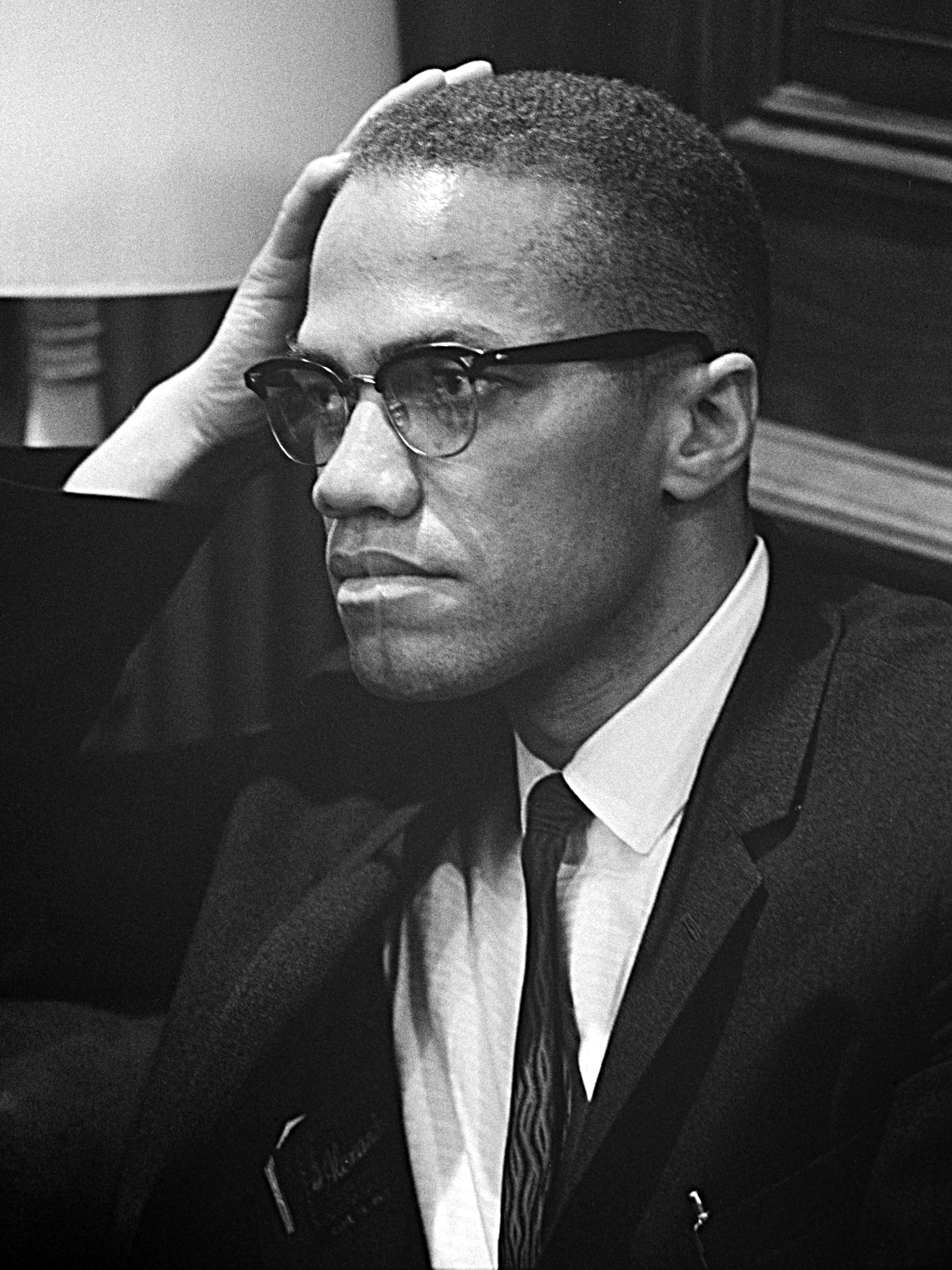
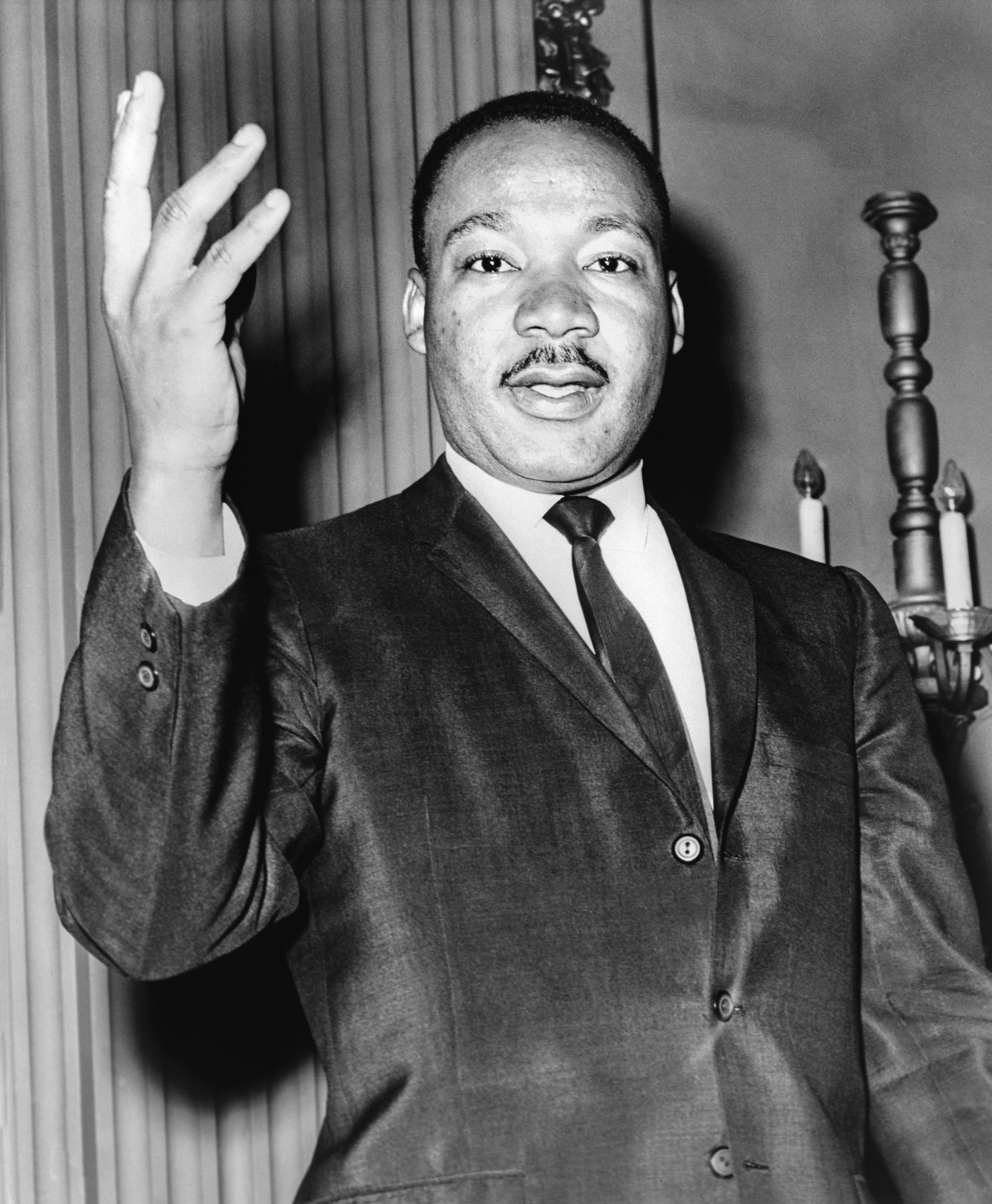
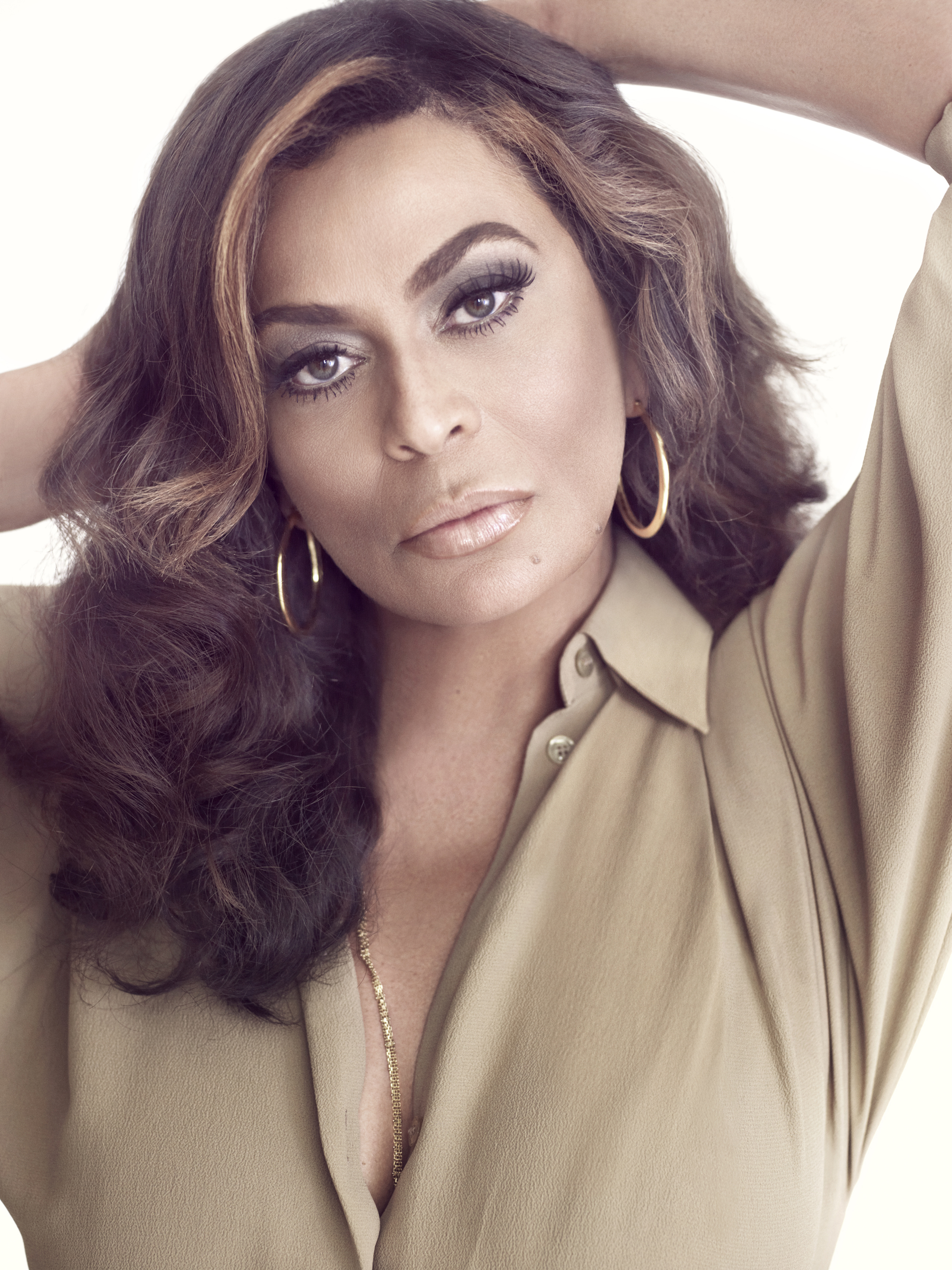
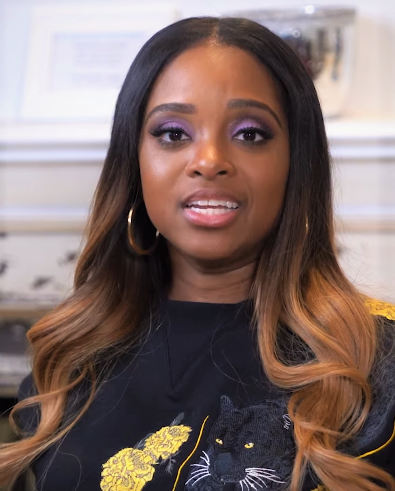
Beyoncé references some of her influences in the track, including Malcolm X, Martin Luther King Jr., Tina Knowles-Lawson and Tamika Mallory.

Nina Corcoran for Consequence of Sound characterized "Black Parade" as a "celebratory blend of pop, trap, hip-hop, and electronica-verging on Detroit techno" with "cascading horns and a chipper flute melody". Jon Pareles of The New York Times described the music as drawing influences from "trap electronics, African songs, brass bands [and] gospel choirs". Mikael Wood of the Los Angeles Times wrote that the track "layers Beyoncé’s throaty singing and casually audacious rapping over a low-slung, brass-equipped groove".

The song tackles issues such as Black history, black culture, police brutality and the 2020 Black Lives Matter protests. It also finds the singer addressing her Texan roots as well as referencing the COVID-19 pandemic, the West African Orishas Oshun and Yemaya, and Black Lives Matter activist Tamika Mallory. During the second verse, Beyoncé asks the listener to "show black love" and demands "peace and reparation for my people". She also gives mention to some of her influences, including Malcolm X, Martin Luther King Jr. and her mother Tina Knowles. Jazz Tangcay of Variety noted that she pointed out the "pride of the community as the world is awakened to the plight of Black Americans". Beyoncé herself concluded that the song "celebrates you, your voice and your joy and will benefit black-owned small businesses".

== Critical reception ==
Idolator declared the track as "one of the year's best songs". Time named "Black Parade" one of the best songs of June 2020, with Raisa Bruner calling the track "a tour-de-force of references: to black history, to African traditions, to her own family and past" and describing Beyoncé as "the queen of a generation providing guidance and assembling her listeners with black solidarity". Writing for NPR, Taylor Crumpton described "Black Parade" as "a call to those on the frontlines" of the George Floyd protests "to march on because their steps and spirits are with the ancestors who advocate and fought for the future of a pro-Black generation". Kiana Fitzgerald of the same publication declared "Black Parade" "a call to action and a salve for a wounded nation" as well as "the ever-evolving artist's offering of musical empowerment". Fitzgerald also praised the myriad references to African American, Afrodiasporic and African culture and history in the song, such as the George Floyd protests, charging crystals in a full moon and the Yoruba goddess Oshun. Cori Murray of Essence agreed, declaring the song "an ode to everything blackity, black, black as she takes listeners on a celebratory joyride from the past to the present", as well as "a Juneteenth anthem and call to action for black businesses".

Nina Corcoran of Consequence of Sound described "Black Parade" as "timely and moving", praising the "celebratory blend" of various musical genres and the lyrics that portray "the unique joys of being Black, touching on everything from womanhood to her heritage and the ways in which Blackness proudly permeates throughout it all". Mark Savage of BBC News praised the track's "powerful lyrics about black history, police brutality and the George Floyd protests", while Mikael Wood of the Los Angeles Times described the track as "a sweeping yet fine-grained salute to blackness in its many forms". Olivia Blair of Elle analyzed the historical and cultural references in "Black Parade", commenting that the "I'm goin' back to the South... Where my roots ain't watered down. Growin', growin' like a Baobab tree" lyric in the song references "the Black history and continued culture of the deep South", as the baobab tree is native to Africa and grows despite the unfavorably warm and dry conditions. Blair also noted that the "Made a picket sign off your picket fence. Take it as a warning" lyric describes turning a symbol of white, suburban neighbourhoods ("which for too long have historically shut out Black people") into a symbol of protest against racism, suggesting that Beyoncé "is committed to dismantling white supremacist structures which have allowed systemic racism and discrimination to continue for so many years".

Jeetendr Sehdev wrote for Forbes that "the first lesson Beyoncé's "Black Parade" teaches us is that we must put our money where our mouth is", with Beyoncé not just releasing the song but also launching the Black Parade Route initiative and founding the Black Business Impact Fund, to which all proceeds from the song are donated. Sehdev continues, writing that "the second lesson that Beyoncé's "Black Parade" teaches us is that we must also provide people with a sense of optimism and hope", a goal which he describes "Black Parade" as "leading the charge" for. Sehdev describes "Black Parade" as "hit[ting] the nail on the head", as a track that addresses "the issue of racism head-on" through "powerful lyrics about black history, police brutality, and the George Floyd protests", but also delivers "content that is both joyful and uplifting in its music and messaging". Mikael Wood of the Los Angeles Times agreed, describing how there is no consensus on what the song of the summer should be like, however, he continues: "Ideally, one song could exult, could object, could mourn, could reassure. And indeed, just such a tune appeared last week from Beyoncé, whose exuberant "Black Parade"... celebrates blackness in its many glories, even as it acknowledges the persistent threats of racism and police violence."

Jessica McKinney of Complex similarly noted that "Black Parade" is "not your typical protest song", writing: "You’ll probably hear people chanting, "We got rhythm, we got pride," at the next BLM event, but don't be surprised if this record comes on at the next summer party, as well". McKinney also described the "irresistible" energy of Beyoncé's "gritty and raw" delivery on the track, noting that Beyoncé "comes out the gate rapping with a rhythmic flow" while also singing on the majority of the record. Patrick Johnson for Hypebeast praised Beyoncé's "incredible, uplifting vocals" on the track. Jon Pareles of The New York Times opined that the track makes "ambitious, far-reaching connections", and wrote that "Beyoncé flaunts new melody ideas in each verse. Voices gather around her, as her solo strut turns into a parade, or a more purposeful march."

=== Year-end lists ===
Brea Cubit of PopSugar named "Black Parade (Extended Version)" her number one go-to song of 2020. iHeartRadio placed "Black Parade" at number 3 in its "30 Songs That Made Us Feel Something In 2020" list, describing the song as "both a party and a history lesson [that] celebrates all aspects of Black culture". Glamour named "Black Parade" the fourth best song of 2020. Consequence of Sound named the single the 13th best song of 2020, with Matt Melis writing: "As the world continues to grow more intimidating and frightening, Beyoncé draws strength from history and urges others to find their own way to follow in a long line of proud Black heritage." In July 2020, Complex named "Black Parade" the 19th best song of 2020 so far. Stereogum named the track the 23rd best song of 2020, describing it as an underappreciated "paean to Black excellence". The track was named the 38th best song of 2020 by Billboard, with Katie Bain describing it as "a swirl of trap beats, flutes and brass" that "evokes the song's titular procession, as Bey delivers an ode to the beauty and strength of Black culture". Bain concluded: "In a moment of the most severe racial conflict many of us have seen in our lifetimes, "Parade" dually uplifted proponents of social justice and reminded us all what we're fighting for." The song was listed as the 22nd best international song of 2020 by Rockdelux. "Black Parade" was also included in HipHopDx's list of the best R&B songs of 2020.

== Commercial performance ==
"Black Parade" debuted on the U.S. Billboard Hot 100 at number 37 on July 4, 2020. The song became Beyoncé's 40th top 40 hit on the Billboard Hot 100, matching Michael Jackson. The song debuted at number one on the Digital Song Sales chart with 18,000 units sold, becoming her ninth number-one on the chart and first solo number-one since "Single Ladies (Put a Ring on It)". "Black Parade" also debuted in the top 30 of numerous international charts, number 13 in Belgium (Ultratip Flanders), number 25 in Scotland (Official Scottish Singles Sales Chart), and number 30 on the Australian ARIA Urban chart.

== Awards and nominations ==
"Black Parade" was the most nominated song at the 63rd Annual Grammy Awards, with four nominations. "Black Parade" won Best R&B Performance, which was Beyoncé's 28th Grammy win, making her the most awarded singer, most awarded female artist, and second-most awarded artist in Grammy history. With the song's nomination for Record of the Year, Beyoncé became the most nominated female artist in this category and now ties Frank Sinatra for the most nominated artist in this category in Grammy history, with seven nominations. Beyoncé also became the second artist in Grammy history (after Pharrell Williams) to receive two Record of the Year nominations in one year, with "Savage Remix" being her second nomination. Beyoncé also became the sixth artist in Grammy history to receive Record of the Year nominations in three different decades (2000s, 2010s and 2020s), after Paul Simon, Paul McCartney, Frank Sinatra, Barbra Streisand, and John Lennon. The song's nomination for Song of the Year marked Beyoncé's fourth nomination in this category, making her one of the top songwriters in Grammy history. With the song's nomination for Best R&B Song, Beyoncé became the second-most nominated artist in this category in Grammy history, with eight nominations.

"Black Parade" received two nominations at the 2020 Soul Train Music Awards: Song of the Year and The Ashford & Simpson Songwriter's Award. This marked Beyoncé's 5th and 6th nominations in these categories, respectively, making Beyoncé the most nominated artist in both categories in Soul Train Music Award history.

Year	Ceremony	Award	Result	Ref(s).
2020	Soul Train Music Awards	Song of the Year	Nominated	
2020	Soul Train Music Awards	The Ashford & Simpson Songwriter's Award	Nominated	
2021	Grammy Awards	Record of the Year	Nominated	
2021	Grammy Awards	Song of the Year	Nominated	
2021	Grammy Awards	Best R&B Performance	Won	
2021	Grammy Awards	Best R&B Song	Nominated	
2021	NAACP Image Awards	Outstanding Soul/R&B Song	Nominated	
2021	NAACP Image Awards	Outstanding Female Artist	Won	

== Personnel ==
Credits adapted from Tidal.

- Recording and production
- Beyoncé – lead artist, songwriting, composition, production
- Derek James Dixie – songwriting, composition, production
- Akil "Fresh" King – songwriting, composition
- Brittany "@chi_coney" Coney – songwriting, composition
- Denisia "@blu_june" Andrews – songwriting, composition
- Kim "Kaydence" Krysiuk – songwriting, composition
- Rickie "Caso" Tice – songwriting, composition
- Shawn Carter – songwriting, composition
- Stuart White – master engineering, mixing engineering, recording engineering
- Additional musicians
- Hailey Niswanger – flute
- Arnetta Johnson – Trumpet
- Cameron Johnson – Trumpet
- Chris Johnson – Trombone
- Christopher Gray – Trumpet
- Crystal Torres – Trumpet
- Lemar Guillary – Trombone
- Pete Ortega – Saxophone

== Charts ==
Chart performance for "Black Parade"
Chart (2020)	Peak position
Australia (ARIA)	76
Australia Urban (ARIA)	30
Belgium (Ultratip Bubbling Under Flanders)	13
Canada Hot 100 (Billboard)	70
Ireland (IRMA)	45
Lithuania (AGATA)	99
New Zealand Hot Singles (RMNZ)	3
Portugal (AFP)	169
Scottish Singles Sales (Official Charts)	25
UK Singles (Official Charts)	49
US Billboard Hot 100	37
US Hot R&B/Hip-Hop Songs (Billboard)	18
US Rolling Stone Top 100	27

== Certifications ==
Region	Certification	Certified units/sales
Brazil (Pro-Música Brasil)	Platinum	40,000^{‡}
United States (RIAA)	Gold	500,000^{‡}
^{‡} Sales+streaming figures based on certification alone.

== Release history ==
Release dates and formats for "Black Parade"
Region	Date	Format(s)	Label	Ref.
Various	June 19, 2020	Digital download; streaming	Parkwood	
Italy	June 20, 2020	Radio airplay	Sony	
