= Akil King =

American songwriter and producer

Akil C. King
- Born: Brownsville, Brooklyn, New York City, U.S.
- Other names: FRESH, WorldWideFresh
- Musical career
- Genres: R&B; pop; soul; hip-hop
- Occupations: Songwriter; producer
- Label: M Publishing / BMG Rights Management

Akil "Fresh" King, also known as "WorldwideFresh", is an American songwriter and producer from New York City. Mentored by producer Scott Storch, King is best known for co-writing "Black Parade", the majority of Brandy's B7, as well as his contributions to various Jessie Reyez, Beyoncé, and Ari Lennox projects, among others. In 2022, he co-wrote "Players", which became rapper Coi Leray's first Billboard Hot 100 top 10 single in the United States, as well as a sizable hit in various global markets.

== Songwriting and production credits ==
Credits are courtesy of Discogs, Tidal, Apple Music, and AllMusic.

Title	Year	Artist	Album
"Outta My League (Interlude)"	2014	Teyana Taylor	VII
"Do Not Disturb" (Featuring Chris Brown)	2014	Teyana Taylor	VII
"Maybe" (Featuring Yo Gotti & Pusha T)	2014	Teyana Taylor	VII
"Dreams"	2014	Teyana Taylor	VII
"Outta My League"	2014	Teyana Taylor	VII
"Nowhere"	2014	Ashanti	Braveheart
"Runaway"	2014	Ashanti	Braveheart
"Behind Closed Doors"	2014	Johnny Gill	Game Changer
"Lifeline"	2014	Tessanne Chin	Count On My Love
"Conqueror"	2015	Estelle	True Romance
"She Will Love"	2015	Estelle	True Romance
"All Night"	2016	Beyoncé	Lemonade
"Kill The Lights"	2016	Alex Newell, DJ Cassidy & Nile Rodgers	Vinyl: The Essentials (Best of Season 1)
"Switch" (Featuring Anitta)	2017	Iggy Azalea	Digital Distortion (Shelved)
"Run Don't Walk"	2017	K. Michelle	Kimberly: The People I Used to Know
"Little Bit More"	2017	Jidenna	The Chief
"Savior" (Featuring Quavo)	2018	Iggy Azalea	Digital Distortion (Shelved)
"Antares"	2018	Kris Wu	Antares
"Coupe" (Featuring Rich the Kid)	2018	Kris Wu	Antares
"Tough Pill"	2018	Kris Wu	Antares
"Explore"	2018	Kris Wu	Antares
"Hold Me Down"	2018	Kris Wu	Antares
"Deserve" (Featuring Travis Scott)	2018	Kris Wu	Antares
"Meet Up" (Featuring Maleek Berry)	2018	Estelle	Lovers Rock
"Don't Wanna" (Featuring Kranium)	2018	Estelle	Lovers Rock
"Karma" (Featuring HoodCelebrityy)	2018	Estelle	Lovers Rock
"Sweetly"	2018	Estelle	Lovers Rock
"Bigger"	2019	Beyoncé	The Lion King: The Gift
"Keys To The Kingdom"	2019	Tiwa Savage & Mr Eazi	The Lion King: The Gift
"Collide"	2019	Tiana Major9 & EarthGang	Queen & Slim (soundtrack)
"Unconditional Oceans"	2020	Brandy	B7
"All My Life, Pt. 1"	2020	Brandy	B7
"Lucid Dreams"	2020	Brandy	B7
"All My Life, Pt. 2"	2020	Brandy	B7
"I Am More"	2020	Brandy	B7
"High Heels" (With Sy'rai)	2020	Brandy	B7
"Baby Mama" (Featuring Chance the Rapper)	2020	Brandy	B7
"All My Life, Pt. 3"	2020	Brandy	B7
"Honeymoon Fades"	2020	Sabrina Carpenter	Non-album single
"Until I Met You" (Featuring Nas)	2020	Alina Baraz	It Was Divine
"We Ride"	2020	Kevin Shin	Non-album single
"Black Parade"	2020	Beyoncé	The Lion King: The Gift (Deluxe Edition)
"Intruders"	2020	Jessie Reyez	Before Love Came to Kill Us
"I Do"	2020	Jessie Reyez	Before Love Came to Kill Us
"Far From Here"	2021	Emmit Fenn	Far From Here
"Speak In Tongues" (Featuring Jada Kingdom)	2022	John Legend	Legend
"Blackberry Sap"	2022	Ari Lennox	D-Day: A Gangsta Grillz Mixtape
"Players"	2022	Coi Leray	Coi
"Bops"	2022	Coi Leray	Coi
"My Body"	2022	Coi Leray	Coi
"Last Time"	2022	The Isley Brothers	Make Me Say It Again, Girl
"Right Way"	2022	The Isley Brothers	Make Me Say It Again, Girl
"Drive Away"	2022	Krewella	The Body Never Lies
"Worth It"	2023	Raye	My 21st Century Blues
"Baby Don't Hurt Me" (With David Guetta & Coi Leray)	2023	Anne-Marie	Unhealthy
"Take It to the Top" (With Becky G & Ayra Starr)	2023	Metro Boomin	Spider-Man: Across the Spider-Verse (soundtrack)
"What It Is (Block Boy)" (Featuring Kodak Black)	2023	Doechii	TBA
"Backroads"	2023	Tanner Adell	Buckle Bunny Deluxe
"Too Easy"	2024	Tanner Adell	Twisters: The Album
"Whiskey Blues"	2024	Tanner Adell	TBA
"Cowboy Break My Heart"	2024	Tanner Adell	TBA
"Silverado"	2024	Tanner Adell	TBA
"Spend Dat"	2026	Yung Miami	Watch Dis
"High Key"	2026	Ari Lennox	Vacancy

== Awards and nominations ==
Year	Ceremony	Award	Result	Ref
2020	2020 Soul Train Music Awards	The Ashford & Simpson Songwriter's Award (Black Parade)	Nominated	
2020	Black Reel Awards of 2020	Black Reel Award for Outstanding Original Song (Collide)	Won	
2021	63rd Annual Grammy Awards	Song of the Year (Black Parade)	Nominated	
2021	63rd Annual Grammy Awards	Best R&B Song (Black Parade)	Nominated	
2021	63rd Annual Grammy Awards	Best R&B Song (Collide)	Nominated	
2024	ASCAP Rhythm & Soul Awards	Most Performed R&B/Hip-Hop Songs (What It Is (Block Boy))	Won	
2024	ASCAP Pop Awards	Most Performed Pop Songs (What It Is (Block Boy))	Won	
2024	ASCAP Pop Awards	Most Performed Pop Songs (Baby Don't Hurt Me)	Won	
2024	BMI Pop Music Awards	Most Performed Pop Songs (Baby Don't Hurt Me)	Won	
2027	69th Annual Grammy Awards	Best Rap Song (Spend Dat)	Nominated	
