= Rickie Tice =

American songwriter

- Other name: Caso
- Musical career
- Genres: R&B; pop; hip hop
- Occupation: Songwriter

Rickie "Caso" Tice is a Grammy-winning American songwriter, best known for co-writing Beyoncé's "Black Parade" from her 2020 album The Lion King: The Gift (Deluxe), as well as "Unfuckwitable" from ZAYN's 2021 album Nobody Is Listening.

== Career ==
As mentioned in a recent E! News interview with Tice about the creation of "Black Parade", the music conjured up images of a royal procession very early in the song creation process. Upon hearing the initial horn arrangement, Tice recalled they mentioned that it "sound[ed] like a parade." Tice continued, "'Can't you see her just like on some elephant or something ridiculously fabulous with all her jewels and everything?' and [the song process] just kind of started like that'".

== Songwriting and production credits ==
Credits are courtesy of Discogs, Tidal, Apple Music, and AllMusic.

Title	Year	Artist	Album
"Keys To The Kingdom"	2019	Tiwa Savage & Mr Eazi	The Lion King: The Gift
"Black Parade"	2020	Beyoncé	The Lion King: The Gift (Deluxe Edition)
"Unfuckwitable"	2021	Zayn Malik	Nobody Is Listening

== Awards and nominations ==
Year	Ceremony	Award	Result	Ref
2020	2020 Soul Train Music Awards	The Ashford & Simpson Songwriter's Award (Black Parade)	Nominated	
2021	63rd Annual Grammy Awards	Grammy Award for Song of the Year (Black Parade)	Nominated	
2021	63rd Annual Grammy Awards	Grammy Award for Best R&B Song (Black Parade)	Nominated	
