= Bigger (Beyoncé song) =

Song by Beyoncé

from the album The Lion King: The Gift
- Released: July 19, 2019
- Studio: NRG Recording Studios (Los Angeles, CA)
- Genre: R&B
- Length: 3:46
- Label: Parkwood; Columbia
- Songwriters: Beyoncé; Richard Lawson; Derek Dixie; Stacy Barthe; Akil King; Rachel Keen
- Producers: Beyoncé; Derek Dixie

"Bigger" (stylized in uppercase) is a song by American singer Beyoncé from the 2019 album The Lion King: The Gift and featured in the 2020 film Black Is King.

== Background ==
The song was penned at a writing camp at Beyoncé's studio and was created due to a bond with British singer-songwriter Raye and US songwriter Stacy Barthe. Raye told BBC Newsbeat: "I remember we were both in a really dark, sad place and we wanted to create something to empower ourselves. We spent maybe two or three hours on it. It was 3 a.m. and I remember Beyoncé's team coming in and hearing what we'd created so far and just completely freaked out. It was incredible." Raye also told Official Charts: "I wrote a lot of songs - I put a shift in. But [Beyoncé] fell in love with Bigger." Beyoncé informed Raye that "Bigger" would be the first song on the album at the 2019 The Lion King European premiere, and her reaction, as caught on video, went viral. Raye tweeted "Beyoncé told me I’ve written Track 1 on the new album ... it’s called Bigger . I can’t I can’t."

== Composition and lyrical interpretation ==
"Bigger" is preceded by "Balance", a Mufasa interlude voiced by James Earl Jones, which samples his "Circle of Life" speech from the 2019 film. The two tracks segue into each other. Dazed described this shift as "tying in nicely with the track’s lyrics." According to The Atlantic, "Bigger" has an overarching theme of "royal succession" as well as an undercurrent exploration of the "ecological and existential" aspects of the "Circle of Life." Matzav Review described "Bigger" as an "ode to the natural riches of the African continent" whilst also serving as a tribute to Beyoncé's children, showing them the paraphrased "power of collective knowledge."

== Music video ==
A music video was released on July 19, 2019, as the second part of an extended edition of the music video from "Spirit", the lead single from the album.

A second music video was released in Black Is King. It features snippets of the original video with new footage filmed specifically for the movie.

== Charts ==
Chart (2019)	Peak position
US Hot R&B Songs (Billboard)	19
US R&B Digital Song Sales (Billboard)	22

== Certifications ==
Region	Certification	Certified units/sales
Brazil (Pro-Música Brasil)	Gold	20,000^{‡}
^{‡} Sales+streaming figures based on certification alone.
