= 63rd Annual Grammy Awards =

2021 US music awards ceremony

- Official poster with original date window
- Date: March 14, 2021
- Location: Los Angeles Convention Center; Los Angeles, California
- Hosted by: Trevor Noah

Highlights
- Most awards: Beyoncé (4)
- Most nominations: Beyoncé (9)
- Website: grammy.com

Television/radio coverage
- Network: CBS
- Viewership: 8.8 million

The 63rd Annual Grammy Awards ceremony was held in and around the Los Angeles Convention Center in Los Angeles on March 14, 2021. It recognized the best recordings, compositions, and artists of the eligibility year, running from September 1, 2019 to August 31, 2020. The nominations were revealed via a virtual livestream on November 24, 2020. The performers for the ceremony were announced on March 7, 2021. South African comedian Trevor Noah hosted the ceremony.

Beyoncé received the most nominations with nine, followed by Dua Lipa, Roddy Ricch, and Taylor Swift with six each. Beyoncé received the most awards with four, surpassing Alison Krauss as the most-awarded woman in the show's history, with 28 awards overall. Her daughter Blue Ivy Carter became the youngest person ever to win a Grammy as an individual at the age of 8 years and 322 days for Best Music Video for "Brown Skin Girl".

Swift won Album of the Year for Folklore, making her the first woman to win the award three times and the first artist to do so since Paul Simon in 1988. Billie Eilish won Record of the Year for "Everything I Wanted", becoming the second solo artist, after Roberta Flack in 1974, to win two years consecutively, and the third overall since U2 in 2002. H.E.R. won Song of the Year for "I Can't Breathe" and Megan Thee Stallion won Best New Artist, becoming the second female rapper to win since Lauryn Hill in 1999.

The ceremony was originally scheduled for January 31, 2021; however, on January 5, 2021, the Recording Academy postponed the ceremony to March 14, 2021, due to a spike in COVID-19 cases in Los Angeles as well as health and safety concerns therein.

== Background ==
The nominations were announced during a virtual livestream on November 24, 2020, by Chair, and Interim Recording Academy President/CEO Harvey Mason Jr., alongside Megan Thee Stallion, Dua Lipa, Mickey Guyton, Lauren Daigle, Pepe Aguilar, Nicola Benedetti, Gayle King, Yemi Alade, BTS, Imogen Heap and Sharon Osbourne. The academy announced Trevor Noah as the host of the ceremony.

=== Category alterations ===
For the 2021 ceremony, the academy announced several changes for different categories and rules:

- The category Best Urban Contemporary Album has been renamed Best Progressive R&B Album.
- The category Best Rap/Sung Performance has been renamed Best Melodic Rap Performance.
- The category Best Latin Pop Album has been renamed Best Latin Pop or Urban Album, and the category Best Latin Rock, Urban or Alternative Album has been renamed Best Latin Rock or Alternative Album.
- The category Best World Music Album has been renamed Best Global Music Album.
- The maximum number of releases have been removed from the category Best New Artist.
- The category Best Musical Theater Album can now only award up to four principal vocalists (previously unlimited) in addition to the album producer and the lyricists/composers (if the album contains at least 51% new material). In the case of an ensemble-driven piece, all vocalists will receive a winner's certificate.

=== Venue and production ===
The 63rd Annual Grammy Awards ceremony was held at Los Angeles Convention Center, while the show's usual venue—Staples Center—served as the backdrop. The show was three and a half hours long.

The Recording Academy appointed Ben Winston as the executive producer of the show, his first time working on a Grammy show. Winston, via Rolling Stone, stated that the show would feature multiple stages, but no audience, highlighting the "creative triumphs, social justice movements, as well as COVID-19's impact on the arts". Regarding the venue shift, Winston stated that he does believe Staples is a safe place, but he wanted "to go above and beyond to make even the most-skeptical participants feel undoubtedly safe". The production was overseen by COVID-19 safety officers. To minimize physical contact, artists had their own backstage area, and entered the stages from different directions.

The show involved five equally sized stages arranged in a circle facing inwards; one of the stages was for presenters and the other four for performers. Crew members worked from the center of the circular set. As soon as one performance ended, the next stage would be covered, and so on. Each stage set-up was changed every 45 minutes and replaced with a different performer in the lineup. Winston mentioned that the concept was inspired by the British entertainment programs Later... with Jools Holland and TFI Friday. The show was a mix of live and pre-recorded performances, as "a fully live show would involve too many crew members moving sets and risking close contact". However, the whole show was planned to feel entirely live.

To help plan the sprawling production and immersive spectacle of the show, Winston collaborated with a multitude of producers, such as co-executive producer Jesse Collins, who produced The Weeknd's Super Bowl halftime show; co-executive producer Raj Kapoor, who handled creative direction for many artists on the last seven Grammy shows and produced Las Vegas concert residencies for Backstreet Boys and Mariah Carey; producer Fatima Robinson, worked on the Black Eyed Peas' 2011 halftime show; producer Misty Buckley, who produced Kacey Musgraves' 2020 Christmas show; talent executive Patrick Menton from Dick Clark Productions; James Corden collaborator Josie Cliff; and Hamish Hamilton, who directed Super Bowl halftimes, Olympic ceremonies, Academy Award, and Emmy Award shows.

== Performers ==
=== Premiere ceremony ===
Performers were announced on March 2, 2021.

Artist(s)	Song(s)
Afro-Peruvian Jazz Orchestra; Thana Alexa; John Beasley; Camilo; Regina Carter; Alexandre Desplat; Bebel Gilberto; Lupita Infante; Sarah Jarosz; Mykal Kilgore; Ledisi; Mariachi Sol De Mexico; PJ Morton; Gregory Porter; Grace Potter; Gustavo Santaolalla; Anoushka Shankar; Kamasi Washington	Tribute to Marvin Gaye "Mercy Mercy Me (The Ecology)"
Lido Pimienta	"Eso Que Tú Haces"
Igor Levit	Piano Sonata No. 14 in C-sharp minor
Jimmy "Duck" Holmes	"Catfish Blues"
Terri Lyne Carrington + Social Science	"Trapped in the American Dream"
Rufus Wainwright	"Hatred"
Poppy	"Eat"
Burna Boy	Medley: "Level Up" "Onyeka" "Ye"

=== Main ceremony ===
Performers for the ceremony were announced on March 7, 2021.

List of performers at the 63rd Annual Grammy Awards
Artist(s)	Song(s)
Harry Styles	"Watermelon Sugar"
Billie Eilish Finneas	"Everything I Wanted"
Haim	"The Steps"
Black Pumas	"Colors"
DaBaby Roddy Ricch Anthony Hamilton	"Rockstar"
Bad Bunny Jhay Cortez	"Dakiti"
Dua Lipa	Medley: "Levitating" (featuring DaBaby) "Future Nostalgia" (dance only) "Don't Start Now"
Silk Sonic (Bruno Mars and Anderson .Paak)	"Leave the Door Open"
Taylor Swift Jack Antonoff Aaron Dessner	Medley: "Cardigan" "August" "Willow"
Silk Sonic Lionel Richie Brandi Carlile Brittany Howard Chris Martin	In Memoriam "Long Tall Sally" "Good Golly Miss Molly" (tribute to Little Richard) "Lady" (tribute to Kenny Rogers) "I Remember Everything" (tribute to John Prine) "You'll Never Walk Alone" (tribute to Gerry Marsden)
Mickey Guyton	"Black Like Me"
Miranda Lambert	"Bluebird"
Maren Morris John Mayer	"The Bones"
Megan Thee Stallion Cardi B	"Body" (Megan Thee Stallion, dance only) "Savage Remix" (Megan Thee Stallion, includes archived vocals by Beyoncé) "Up" (Cardi B) "WAP" (includes Pedro Sampaio funk carioca remix)
Post Malone	"Hollywood's Bleeding"
Lil Baby Tamika Mallory Killer Mike	"The Bigger Picture"
Doja Cat	"Say So"
BTS	"Dynamite"
Roddy Ricch	"Heartless" "The Box"

== Presenters ==
Premiere ceremony

- Jhené Aiko – host
- Bill Burr
- Chika
- Lupita Infante
- Jimmy Jam

Main ceremony

- Lizzo – presented Best New Artist
- Trevor Noah - presented Best Melodic Rap Performance, Best Latin Pop or Urban Album, and Song of the Year
- Jacob Collier and Jhené Aiko – presented Best Pop Vocal Album
- Jimmy Jam and Babyface – presented Best R&B Performance
- Ringo Starr – presented Record of the Year

== Winners and nominees ==
Winners appear first and highlighted in Bold.

=== General field ===
Record of the Year

- **"Everything I Wanted" – Billie Eilish**
  - **Finneas O'Connell, producer; Rob Kinelski & Finneas O'Connell, engineers/mixers; John Greenham, mastering engineer**
- "Black Parade" – Beyoncé
  - Beyoncé & Derek Dixie, producers; Stuart White, engineer/mixer; Colin Leonard, mastering engineer
- "Colors" – Black Pumas
  - Adrian Quesada, producer; Adrian Quesada, engineer/mixer; JJ Golden, mastering engineer
- "Rockstar" – DaBaby featuring Roddy Ricch
  - SethinTheKitchen, producer; Derek "MixedByAli" Ali, Chris Dennis, Liz Robson & Chris West, engineers/mixers; Glenn A Tabor III, mastering engineer
- "Say So" – Doja Cat
  - Tyson Trax, producer; Clint Gibbs & Kalani Thompson, engineer/mixer; Mike Bozzi, mastering engineer
- "Don't Start Now" – Dua Lipa
  - Caroline Ailin & Ian Kirkpatrick, producers; Josh Gudwin, Drew Jurecka & Ian Kirkpatrick, engineers/mixers; Chris Gehringer, mastering engineer
- "Circles" – Post Malone
  - Louis Bell, Frank Dukes & Post Malone, producers; Louis Bell & Manny Marroquin, engineers/mixers; Mike Bozzi, mastering engineer
- "Savage" – Megan Thee Stallion featuring Beyoncé
  - Beyoncé & J. White Did It, producers; Stuart White, engineer/mixer; Colin Leonard, mastering engineer

Album of the Year

- **Folklore – Taylor Swift**
  - **Joe Alwyn, Jack Antonoff, Aaron Dessner & Taylor Swift, producers; Jack Antonoff, Aaron Dessner, Șerban Ghenea, John Hanes, Jonathan Low & Laura Sisk, engineers/mixers; Aaron Dessner & Taylor Swift, songwriters; Randy Merrill, mastering engineer**
- Chilombo – Jhené Aiko
  - Fisticuffs & Julian-Quán Việt Lê, producers; Fisticuffs, Julian-Quán Việt Lê, Zeke Mishanec, Christian Plata & Gregg Rominiecki, engineers/mixers; Jhené Aiko Efuru Chilombo, Julian-Quán Việt Lê, Maclean Robinson & Brian Keith Warfield, songwriters; Dave Kutch, mastering engineer
- Black Pumas (Deluxe Edition) – Black Pumas
  - Adrian Quesada, producers; Adrian Quesada, engineer/mixer; Eric Burton & Adrian Quesada, songwriters; JJ Golden, mastering engineer
- Everyday Life – Coldplay
  - Daniel Green, Bill Rahko & Rik Simpson, producers; Mark "Spike" Stent, engineer/mixer; Guy Berryman, Jonny Buckland, Will Champion & Chris Martin, songwriters; Emily Lazar, mastering engineer
- Djesse Vol. 3 – Jacob Collier
  - Jacob Collier, producer; Ben Bloomberg & Jacob Collier, engineers/mixers; Jacob Collier, songwriter; Chris Allgood & Emily Lazar, mastering engineers
- Women in Music Pt. III – Haim
  - Rostam Batmanglij, Danielle Haim & Ariel Rechtshaid, producers; Rostam Batmanglij, Jasmine Chen, John DeBold, Matt DiMona, Tom Elmhirst, Joey Messina-Doerning & Ariel Rechtshaid, engineers/mixers; Rostam Batmanglij, Alana Haim, Danielle Haim, Este Haim & Ariel Rechtshaid, songwriters; Emily Lazar, mastering engineer
- Future Nostalgia – Dua Lipa
  - Lorna Blackwood & Koz, producer; Josh Gudwin & Cameron Gower Poole, engineers/mixers; Clarence Coffee Jr. & Dua Lipa, songwriters; Chris Gehringer, mastering engineer
- Hollywood's Bleeding – Post Malone
  - Louis Bell & Frank Dukes, producers; Louis Bell & Manny Marroquin, engineers/mixers; Louis Bell, Adam Feeney, Austin Post & Billy Walsh, songwriters; Mike Bozzi, mastering engineer

Song of the Year

- **"I Can't Breathe"**
  - **Dernst Emile II, H.E.R. & Tiara Thomas, songwriters (H.E.R.)**
- "Black Parade"
  - Denisia Andrews, Beyoncé, Stephen Bray, Shawn Carter, Brittany Coney, Derek James Dixie, Akil King, Kim "Kaydence" Krysiuk & Rickie "Caso" Tice, songwriters (Beyoncé)
- "The Box"
  - Larrance Dopson, Samuel Gloade, Rodrick Moore, Adarius Moragne, Eric Sloan & Khirye Anthony Tyler, songwriters (Roddy Ricch)
- "Cardigan"
  - Aaron Dessner & Taylor Swift, songwriters (Swift)
- "Circles"
  - Louis Bell, Adam Feeney, Kaan Gunesberk, Austin Post & Billy Walsh, songwriters (Post Malone)
- "Don't Start Now"
  - Caroline Ailin, Ian Kirkpatrick, Dua Lipa & Emily Warren, songwriters (Lipa)
- "Everything I Wanted"
  - Billie Eilish & Finneas O'Connell, songwriters (Eilish)
- "If the World Was Ending"
  - Julia Michaels & JP Saxe, songwriters (Saxe featuring Michaels)

Best New Artist

- **Megan Thee Stallion**
- Ingrid Andress
- Phoebe Bridgers
- Noah Cyrus
- Chika
- D Smoke
- Doja Cat
- Kaytranada

=== Pop ===
Best Pop Solo Performance

- **"Watermelon Sugar" – Harry Styles**
- "Yummy" – Justin Bieber
- "Say So" – Doja Cat
- "Everything I Wanted" – Billie Eilish
- "Don't Start Now" – Dua Lipa
- "Cardigan" – Taylor Swift

Best Pop Duo/Group Performance

- **"Rain on Me" – Lady Gaga & Ariana Grande**
- "Un Día (One Day)" – J Balvin, Dua Lipa, Bad Bunny & Tainy
- "Intentions" – Justin Bieber featuring Quavo
- "Dynamite" – BTS
- "Exile" – Taylor Swift featuring Bon Iver

Best Traditional Pop Vocal Album

- **American Standard – James Taylor**
- Blue Umbrella – Burt Bacharach & Daniel Tashian
- True Love: A Celebration of Cole Porter – Harry Connick Jr.
- Unfollow the Rules – Rufus Wainwright
- Judy – Renée Zellweger

Best Pop Vocal Album

- **Future Nostalgia – Dua Lipa**
- Changes – Justin Bieber
- Chromatica – Lady Gaga
- Fine Line – Harry Styles
- Folklore – Taylor Swift

=== Dance/electronic music ===
Best Dance Recording

- **"10%" – Kaytranada featuring Kali Uchis**
  - Kaytranada, producer; Neal H. Pogue, mixer
- "On My Mind" – Diplo & Sidepiece
  - Diplo & Sidepiece, producers; Luca Pretolesi, mixer
- "My High" – Disclosure, Aminé and Slowthai
  - Guy Lawrence & Howard Lawrence, producers; G. Lawrence, mixer
- "The Difference" – Flume featuring Toro y Moi
  - Flume, producer; Eric J Dubowsky, mixer
- "Both of Us" – Jayda G
  - Fred Again & G, producers; Again & G, mixers

Best Dance/Electronic Album

- **Bubba – Kaytranada**
- Kick I – Arca
- Energy – Disclosure
- Planet's Mad – Baauer
- Good Faith – Madeon

=== Contemporary instrumental music ===
Best Contemporary Instrumental Album

- **Live at the Royal Albert Hall – Snarky Puppy**
- Axiom – Christian Scott Atunde Adjuah
- Chronology of a Dream: Live at The Village Vanguard – Jon Batiste
- Take the Stairs – Black Violin
- Americana – Grégoire Maret, Romain Collin & Bill Frisell

=== Rock ===
Best Rock Performance

- **"Shameika" – Fiona Apple**
- "The Steps" – HAIM
- "Stay High" – Brittany Howard
- "Not" – Big Thief
- "Kyoto" – Phoebe Bridgers
- "Daylight" – Grace Potter

Best Metal Performance

- **"Bum-Rush" – Body Count**
- "Underneath" – Code Orange
- "The In-Between" – In This Moment
- "Bloodmoney" – Poppy
- "Executioner's Tax (Swing of the Axe)" – Power Trip

Best Rock Song

- **"Stay High"**
  - **Brittany Howard, songwriter (Howard)**
- "Kyoto"
  - Phoebe Bridgers, Morgan Nagler & Marshall Vore (Bridgers)
- "Lost in Yesterday"
  - Kevin Parker, songwriter (Tame Impala)
- "Not"
  - Adrianne Lenker, songwriter (Big Thief)
- "Shameika"
  - Fiona Apple, songwriter (Apple)

Best Rock Album

- **The New Abnormal – The Strokes**
- A Hero's Death – Fontaines D.C.
- Kiwanuka – Michael Kiwanuka
- Daylight – Grace Potter
- Sound & Fury – Sturgill Simpson

=== Alternative ===
Best Alternative Music Album

- **Fetch the Bolt Cutters – Fiona Apple**
- Hyperspace – Beck
- Punisher – Phoebe Bridgers
- Jaime – Brittany Howard
- The Slow Rush – Tame Impala

=== R&B ===
Best R&B Performance

- **"Black Parade" – Beyoncé**
- "Lightning & Thunder" – Jhené Aiko featuring John Legend
- "All I Need" – Jacob Collier featuring Mahalia & Ty Dolla $ign
- "Goat Head" – Brittany Howard
- "See Me" – Emily King

Best Traditional R&B Performance

- **"Anything for You" – Ledisi**
- "Sit On Down" – The Baylor Project featuring Jean Baylor & Marcus Baylor
- "Wonder What She Thinks of Me" – Chloe x Halle
- "Let Me Go" – Mykal Kilgore
- "Distance" – Yebba

Best R&B Song

- **"Better Than I Imagined"**
  - **Robert Glasper, Meshell Ndegeocello & Gabriella Wilson, songwriters (Robert Glasper featuring H.E.R. & Meshell Ndegeocello)**
- "Black Parade"
  - Denisia Andrews, Beyoncé, Stephen Bray, Shawn Carter, Brittany Coney, Derek James Dixie, Akil King, Kim "Kaydence" Krysiuk & Rickie "Caso" Tice, songwriters (Beyoncé)
- "Collide"
  - Sam Barsh, Stacy Barthe, Sonyae Elise, Olu Fann, Akil King, Josh Lopez, Kaveh Rastegar & Benedetto Rotondi, songwriters (Tiana Major9 & EarthGang)
- "Do It"
  - Chloe Bailey, Halle Bailey, Anton Kuhl, Scott Storch, Victoria Monét, Vincent van den Ende, songwriters (Chloe x Halle)
- "Slow Down"
  - Nasri Atweh, Badriia Bourelly, Skip Marley, Ryan Williamson & Gabriella Wilson, songwriters (Skip Marley & H.E.R.)

Best Progressive R&B Album

- **It Is What It Is – Thundercat**
- Chilombo – Jhené Aiko
- Ungodly Hour – Chloe x Halle
- Free Nationals – Free Nationals
- Fuck Yo Feelings – Robert Glasper

Best R&B Album

- **Bigger Love – John Legend**
- Happy 2 Be Here – Ant Clemons
- Take Time – Giveon
- To Feel Love/D – Luke James
- All Rise – Gregory Porter

=== Rap ===
Best Rap Performance

- **"Savage" – Megan Thee Stallion featuring Beyoncé**
- "Deep Reverence" – Big Sean featuring Nipsey Hussle
- "Bop" – DaBaby
- "Whats Poppin" – Jack Harlow
- "The Bigger Picture" – Lil Baby
- "Dior" – Pop Smoke

Best Melodic Rap Performance

- **"Lockdown" – Anderson .Paak**
- "Rockstar" – DaBaby featuring Roddy Ricch
- "Laugh Now Cry Later" – Drake featuring Lil Durk
- "The Box" – Roddy Ricch
- "Highest in the Room" – Travis Scott

Best Rap Song

- **"Savage"**
  - **Beyoncé, Shawn Carter, Brittany Hazzard, Derrick Milano, Terius Nash, Megan Pete, Bobby Session Jr., Jordan Kyle Lanier Thorpe & Anthony White, songwriters (Megan Thee Stallion featuring Beyoncé)**
- "The Bigger Picture"
  - Dominique Jones, Rai'Shaun Williams, Noah Pettigrew, songwriters (Lil Baby)
- "The Box"
  - Larrance Dopson, Samuel Gloade, Rodrick Moore, Adarius Moragne, Eric Sloan & Khirye Anthony Tyler, songwriters (Roddy Ricch)
- "Laugh Now Cry Later"
  - Durk Banks, Rogét Chahayed, Aubrey Graham, Daveon Jackson, Ron LaTour & Ryan Martinez, songwriters (Drake featuring Lil Durk)
- "Rockstar"
  - Jonathan Lyndale Kirk, Ross Joseph Portaro IV & Rodrick Moore, songwriters (DaBaby featuring Roddy Ricch)

Best Rap Album

- **King's Disease – Nas**
- Black Habits – D Smoke
- Alfredo – Freddie Gibbs & The Alchemist
- A Written Testimony – Jay Electronica
- The Allegory – Royce da 5'9"

=== Country ===
Best Country Solo Performance

- **"When My Amy Prays" – Vince Gill**
- "Stick That in Your Country Song" – Eric Church
- "Who You Thought I Was" – Brandy Clark
- "Bluebird" – Miranda Lambert
- "Black Like Me" – Mickey Guyton

Best Country Duo/Group Performance

- **"10,000 Hours" – Dan + Shay and Justin Bieber**
- "All Night" – Brothers Osborne
- "Ocean" – Lady A
- "Sugar Coat" – Little Big Town
- "Some People Do" – Old Dominion

Best Country Song

- **"Crowded Table"**
  - **Brandi Carlile, Natalie Hemby & Lori McKenna, songwriters (The Highwomen)**
- "Bluebird"
  - Luke Dick, Natalie Hemby & Miranda Lambert, songwriters (Miranda Lambert)
- "The Bones"
  - Maren Morris, Jimmy Robbins & Laura Veltz, songwriters (Maren Morris)
- "More Hearts Than Mine"
  - Ingrid Andress, Sam Ellis & Derrick Southerland, songwriters (Ingrid Andress)
- "Some People Do"
  - Jesse Frasure, Shane McAnally, Matthew Ramsey & Thomas Rhett, songwriters (Old Dominion)

Best Country Album

- **Wildcard – Miranda Lambert**
- Nightfall – Little Big Town
- Never Will – Ashley McBryde
- Lady Like – Ingrid Andress
- Your Life Is a Record – Brandy Clark

=== New age ===
Best New Age Album

- **More Guitar Stories – Jim "Kimo" West**
- Songs from the Bardo – Laurie Anderson, Tenzin Choegyal & Jesse Paris Smith
- Periphery – Priya Darshini
- Form//Less – Superposition
- Meditations – Cory Wong & Jon Batiste

=== Jazz ===
Best Improvised Jazz Solo

- **"All Blues" – Chick Corea, soloist**
- "Guinnevere" – Christian Scott Atunde Adjuah, soloist
- "Pachamama" – Regina Carter, soloist
- "Celia" – Gerald Clayton, soloist
- "Moe Honk" – Joshua Redman, soloist

Best Jazz Vocal Album

- **Secrets are the Best Stories – Kurt Elling featuring Danilo Pérez**
- ONA – Thana Alexa
- Modern Ancestors – Carmen Lundy
- Holy Room: Live at Alte Oper – Somi With Frankfurt Radio Big Band
- What's the Hurry – Kenny Washington

Best Jazz Instrumental Album

- **Trilogy 2 – Chick Corea, Christian McBride & Brian Blade**
- On the Tender Spot of Every Calloused Moment – Ambrose Akinmusire
- Waiting Game – Terri Lyne Carrington and Social Science
- Happening: Live at the Village Vanguard – Gerald Clayton
- RoundAgain – Redman Mehldau McBride Blade

Best Large Jazz Ensemble Album

- **Data Lords – Maria Schneider Orchestra**
- Dialogues on Race – Gregg August
- Monk'estra Plays John Beasley – John Beasley
- The Intangible Between – Orrin Evans and The Captain Black Big Band
- Songs You Like a Lot – John Hollenbeck with Theo Bleckmann, Kate McGarry, Gary Versace and The Frankfurt Radio Big Band

Best Latin Jazz Album

- **Four Questions – Arturo O'Farrill & The Afro Latin Jazz Orchestra**
- Tradiciones – Afro-Peruvian Jazz Orchestra
- City of Dreams – Chico Pinheiro
- Viento y Tiempo – Live at Blue Note Tokyo – Gonzalo Rubalcaba & Aymée Nuviola
- Trane's Delight – Poncho Sanchez

=== Gospel/contemporary Christian music ===
Best Gospel Performance/Song

- **"Movin' On"**
  - **Darryl L. Howell, Jonathan Caleb McReynolds, Kortney Jamaal Pollard & Terrell Demetrius Wilson, songwriters (Jonathan McReynolds & Mali Music)**
- "Wonderful is Your Name"
  - Melvin Crispell III, songwriter (Melvin Crispell III)
- "Release (Live)"
  - David Frazier, songwriter (Ricky Dillard featuring Tiff Joy)
- "Come Together"
  - Lashawn Daniels, Rodney Jerkins, Lecrae Moore & Jazz Nixon, songwriters (Rodney "Darkchild" Jerkins Presents: The Good News)
- "Won't Let Go"
  - Travis Greene, songwriter (Travis Greene)

Best Contemporary Christian Music Performance/Song

- **"There Was Jesus"**
  - Casey Beathard, Jonathan Smith & Zach Williams, songwriters (Zach Williams & Dolly Parton)
- "The Blessing (Live)"
  - Chris Brown, Cody Carnes, Kari Jobe Carnes & Steven Furtick, songwriters (Kari Jobe, Cody Carnes & Elevation Worship)
- "Sunday Morning"
  - Denisia Andrews, Jones Terrence Antonio, Saint Bodhi, Brittany Coney, Kirk Franklin, Lasanna Harris, Shama Joseph, Stuart Lowery, Lecrae Moore & Nathanael Saint-Fleur, songwriters (Lecrae featuring Kirk Franklin)
- "Holy Water"
  - Andrew Bergthold, Ed Cash, Franni Cash, Martin Cash & Scott Cash, songwriters (We the Kingdom)
- "Famous For (I Believe)"
  - Chuck Butler, Krissy Nordhoff, Jordan Sapp, Alexis Slifer & Tauren Wells, songwriters (Tauren Wells featuring Jenn Johnson)

Best Gospel Album

- **Gospel According to PJ – PJ Morton**
- 2econd Wind: ReadY – Anthony Brown & group therAPy
- My Tribute – Myron Butler
- Choirmaster – Ricky Dillard
- Kierra – Kierra Sheard

Best Contemporary Christian Music Album

- **Jesus Is King – Kanye West**
- Run to the Father – Cody Carnes
- All of My Best Friends – Hillsong Young & Free
- Holy Water – We the Kingdom
- Citizen of Heaven – Tauren Wells

Best Roots Gospel Album

- **Celebrating Fisk! (The 150th Anniversary Album) – Fisk Jubilee Singers**
- Beautiful Day – Mark Bishop
- 20/20 – The Crabb Family
- What Christmas Really Means – The Erwins
- Something Beautiful – Ernie Haase & Signature Sound

=== Latin ===
Best Latin Pop or Urban Album

- **YHLQMDLG – Bad Bunny**
- Por Primera Vez – Camilo
- Mesa Para Dos – Kany García
- Pausa – Ricky Martin
- 3:33 – Debi Nova

Best Latin Rock or Alternative Album

- **La Conquista del Espacio – Fito Páez**
- Aura – Bajofondo
- MONSTRUO – Cami
- Sobrevolando – Cultura Profética
- Miss Colombia – Lido Pimienta

Best Regional Mexican Music Album (Including Tejano)

- **Un Canto por México, Vol. 1 – Natalia Lafourcade**
- Hecho en México – Alejandro Fernández
- La Serenata – Lupita Infante
- Bailando Sones y Huampangos con Mariachi Sol De Mexico De Jose Hernandez – Mariachi Sol De Mexico De Jose Hernandez
- AYAYAY! – Christian Nodal

Best Tropical Latin Album

- **40 – Grupo Niche**
- Mi Tumbao – José Alberto "El Ruiseñor"
- Infinito – Edwin Bonilla
- Sigo Cantando al Amor (Deluxe) – Jorge Celedon & Sergio Luis
- Memorias de Navidad – Víctor Manuelle

=== American roots ===
Best American Roots Performance

- **"I Remember Everything" – John Prine**
- "Colors" – Black Pumas
- "Deep in Love" – Bonny Light Horseman
- "Short and Sweet" – Brittany Howard
- "I'll Be Gone" – Norah Jones & Mavis Staples

Best American Roots Song

- **"I Remember Everything"**
  - **Pat McLaughlin & John Prine, songwriters (John Prine)**
- "Cabin"
  - Laura Rogers & Lydia Rogers, songwriters (The Secret Sisters)
- "Ceiling to the Floor"
  - Sierra Hull & Kai Welch, songwriters (Sierra Hull)
- "Hometown"
  - Sarah Jarosz, songwriter (Sarah Jarosz)
- "Man Without a Soul"
  - Tom Overby & Lucinda Williams, songwriters (Lucinda Williams)

Best Americana Album

- **World on the Ground – Sarah Jarosz**
- Old Flowers – Courtney Marie Andrews
- Terms of Surrender – Hiss Golden Messenger
- El Dorado – Marcus King
- Good Souls Better Angels – Lucinda Williams

Best Bluegrass Album

- **Home – Billy Strings**
- Man on Fire – Danny Barnes
- To Live in Two Worlds, Vol. 1 – Thomm Jutz
- North Carolina Songbook – Steep Canyon Rangers
- The John Hartford Fiddle Tune Project, Vol. 1 – Various Artists

Best Traditional Blues Album

- **Rawer than Raw – Bobby Rush**
- All My Dues are Paid – Frank Bey
- You Make Me Feel – Don Bryant
- That's What I Heard – Robert Cray Band
- Cypress Grove – Jimmy "Duck" Holmes

Best Contemporary Blues Album

- **Have You Lost Your Mind Yet? – Fantastic Negrito**
- Live at the Paramount – Ruthie Foster Big Band
- The Juice – G. Love
- Blackbirds – Bettye LaVette
- Up and Rolling – North Mississippi Allstars

Best Folk Album

- **All the Good Times – Gillian Welch & David Rawlings**
- Bonny Light Horseman – Bonny Light Horseman
- Thanks for the Dance – Leonard Cohen
- Song for Our Daughter – Laura Marling
- Saturn Return – The Secret Sisters

Best Regional Roots Music Album

- **Atmosphere – New Orleans Nightcrawlers**
- My Relatives 'nikso' Kowaiks – Black Lodge Singers
- Cameron Dupuy and The Cajun Troubadours – Cameron Dupuy and the Cajun Troubadours
- Lovely Sunrise – Nā Wai ʽEhā
- A Tribute to Al Berard – Sweet Cecilia

=== Reggae ===
Best Reggae Album

- **Got to Be Tough – Toots and the Maytals**
- Upside Down 2020 – Buju Banton
- Higher Place – Skip Marley
- It All Comes Black to Love – Maxi Priest
- One World – The Wailers

=== Global music ===
Best Global Music Album

- **Twice as Tall – Burna Boy**
- Fu Chronicles – Antibalas
- Agora – Bebel Gilberto
- Love Letters – Anoushka Shankar
- Amadjar – Tinariwen

=== Children's ===
Best Children's Album

- **All the Ladies – Joanie Leeds**
- Be a Pain: An Album for Young (and Old) Leaders – Alastair Moock And Friends
- I'm an Optimist – Dog On Fleas
- Songs for Singin' – The Okee Dokee Brothers
- Wild Life – Justin Roberts

=== Spoken word ===
Best Spoken Word Album (Includes Poetry, Audio Books & Storytelling)

- **Blowout: Corrupted Democracy, Rogue State Russia, and the Richest, Most Destructive Industry on Earth – Rachel Maddow**
- Acid for the Children – A Memoir – Flea
- Alex Trebek – The Answer Is... – Ken Jennings
- Catch and Kill – Ronan Farrow
- Charlotte's Web (E.B. White) – Meryl Streep and Full Cast

=== Comedy ===
Best Comedy Album

- **Black Mitzvah – Tiffany Haddish**
- I Love Everything – Patton Oswalt
- The Pale Tourist – Jim Gaffigan
- Paper Tiger – Bill Burr
- 23 Hours to Kill – Jerry Seinfeld

=== Musical theater ===
Best Musical Theater Album

- **Jagged Little Pill – Kathryn Gallagher, Celia Rose Gooding, Lauren Patten & Elizabeth Stanley, principal soloists; Neal Avron, Pete Ganbarg, Tom Kitt, Michael Parker, Craig Rosen & Vivek J. Tiwary, producers (Glen Ballard & Alanis Morissette, lyricists) (Original Broadway Cast)**
- Amélie – Audrey Brisson, Chris Jared, Caolan McCarthy & Jez Unwin, principal soloists; Michael Fentiman, Sean Patrick Flahaven, Barnaby Race & Nathan Tysen, producers; Nathan Tysen, lyricist; Daniel Messe, composer & lyricist (Original London Cast)
- American Utopia on Broadway – David Byrne, principal soloist; David Byrne, producer (David Byrne, composer & lyricist) (Original Cast)
- Little Shop of Horrors – Tammy Blanchard, Jonathan Groff & Tom Alan Robbins, principal soloists; Will Van Dyke, Michael Mayer, Alan Menken & Frank Wolf, producers (Alan Menken, composer; Howard Ashman, lyricist) (The New Off-Broadway Cast)
- The Prince of Egypt – Christine Allado, Luke Brady, Alexia Khadime & Liam Tamne, principal soloists; Dominick Amendum & Stephen Schwartz, producers; Stephen Schwartz, composer & lyricist (Original Cast)
- Soft Power – Francis Jue, Austin Ku, Alyse Alan Louis & Conrad Ricamora, principal soloists; Matt Stine, producer; David Henry Hwang, lyricist; Jeanine Tesori, composer & lyricist (Original Cast)

=== Music for visual media ===
Best Compilation Soundtrack for Visual Media

- **Jojo Rabbit – Various artists**
- A Beautiful Day in the Neighborhood – Various artists
- Bill & Ted Face the Music – Various artists
- Eurovision Song Contest: The Story of Fire Saga – Various artists
- Frozen 2 – Various artists

Best Score Soundtrack for Visual Media

- **Joker – Hildur Guðnadóttir, composer**
- Ad Astra – Max Richter, composer
- Becoming – Kamasi Washington, composer
- 1917 – Thomas Newman, composer
- Star Wars: The Rise of Skywalker – John Williams, composer

Best Song Written for Visual Media

- **"No Time to Die" (from No Time to Die)**
  - **Billie Eilish O'Connell and Finneas O'Connell (Billie Eilish)**
- "Beautiful Ghosts" (from Cats)
  - Andrew Lloyd Webber and Taylor Swift (Taylor Swift)
- "Carried Me with You" (from Onward)
  - Brandi Carlile, Phil Hanseroth and Tim Hanseroth (Brandi Carlile)
- "Into the Unknown" (from Frozen 2)
  - Kristen Anderson-Lopez and Robert Lopez (Idina Menzel featuring AURORA)
- "Stand Up" (from Harriet)
  - Joshuah Brian Campbell and Cynthia Erivo (Cynthia Erivo)

=== Composing/Arranging ===
Best Instrumental Composition

- **"Sputnik"**
  - **Maria Schneider, composer (Maria Schneider)**
- "Baby Jack"
  - Arturo O'Farrill, composer (Arturo O'Farrill & The Afro Latin Jazz Orchestra)
- "Be Water II"
  - Christian Sands, composer (Christian Sands)
- "Plumfield"
  - Alexandre Desplat, composer (Alexandre Desplat)
- "Strata"
  - Remy Le Boeuf, composer (Remy Le Boeuf's Assembly Of Shadows featuring Anna Webber & Eric Miller)

Best Arrangement, Instrumental or A Cappella

- **"Donna Lee"**
  - **John Beasley, arranger (John Beasley)**
- "Bathroom Dance"
  - Hildur Guðnadóttir, arranger (Hildur Guðnadóttir)
- "Honeymooners"
  - Remy Le Boeuf, arranger (Remy Le Boeuf's Assembly Of Shadows)
- "Lift Every Voice and Sing"
  - Alvin Chea & Jarrett Johnson, arrangers (Jarrett Johnson Featuring Alvin Chea)
- "Uranus: The Magician"
  - Jeremy Levy, arranger (Jeremy Levy Jazz Orchestra)

Best Arrangement, Instruments and Vocals

- **"He Won't Hold You"**
  - **Jacob Collier, arranger (Jacob Collier featuring Rapsody)**
- "Asas Fechadas"
  - John Beasley & Maria Mendes, arrangers (Maria Mendes Featuring John Beasley & Orkest Metropole)
- "Desert Song"
  - Erin Bentlage, Sara Gazarek, Johnaye Kendrick & Amanda Taylor, arrangers (säje)
- "From This Place"
  - Alan Broadbent & Pat Metheny, arrangers (Pat Metheny featuring Meshell Ndegeocello)
- "Slow Burn"
  - Talia Billig, Nic Hard & Becca Stevens, arrangers (Becca Stevens featuring Jacob Collier, Mark Lettieri, Justin Stanton, Jordan Perlson, Nic Hard, Keita Ogawa, Marcelo Woloski & Nate Werth)

=== Package ===
Best Recording Package

- **Vols. 11 & 12**
  - **Doug Cunningham & Jason Noto, art directors (Desert Sessions)**
- Everyday Life
  - Pilar Zeta, art director (Coldplay)
- Funeral
  - Kyle Goen, art director (Lil Wayne)
- Healer
  - Julian Gross & Hannah Hooper, art directors (Grouplove)
- On Circles
  - Jordan Butcher, art director (Caspian)

Best Boxed or Special Limited Edition Package

- **Ode to Joy**
  - **Lawrence Azerrad & Jeff Tweedy, art directors (Wilco)**
- Flaming Pie (Collector's Edition)
  - Linn Wie Andersen, Simon Earith, Paul McCartney & James Musgrave, art directors (Paul McCartney)
- Giants Stadium 1987, 1989, 1991
  - Lisa Glines & Doran Tyson, art directors (Grateful Dead)
- Mode
  - Jeff Schulz, art director (Depeche Mode)
- The Story of Ghostly International
  - Michael Cina & Molly Smith, art directors (Various Artists)

=== Notes ===
Best Album Notes

- **Dead Man's Pop**
  - **Bob Mehr, album notes writer (The Replacements)**
- At The Minstrel Show: Minstrel Routines From The Studio, 1894–1926
  - Tim Brooks, album notes writer (Various Artists)
- The Bakersfield Sound: Country Music Capital Of The West, 1940–1974
  - Scott B. Bomar, album notes writer (Various Artists)
- The Missing Link: How Gus Haenschen Got Us From Joplin To Jazz And Shaped The Music Business
  - Colin Hancock, album notes writer (Various Artists)
- Out Of A Clear Blue Sky
  - David Sager, album notes writer (Nat Brusiloff)

=== Historical ===
Best Historical Album

- **It's Such a Good Feeling: The Best of Mister Rogers**
  - **Lee Lodyga & Cheryl Pawelski, compilation producers; Michael Graves, mastering engineer (Mister Rogers)**
- Celebrated, 1895–1896
  - Meagan Hennessey & Richard Martin, compilation producers; Richard Martin, mastering engineer (Unique Quartette)
- Hittin' the Ramp: The Early Years (1936–1943)
  - Zev Feldman, Will Friedwald & George Klabin, compilation producers; Matthew Lutthans, mastering engineer (Nat King Cole)
- 1999 Super Deluxe Edition
  - Michael Howe, compilation producer; Bernie Grundman, mastering engineer (Prince)
- Souvenir
  - Carolyn Agger, compilation producer; Miles Showell, mastering engineer (Orchestral Manoeuvres in the Dark)
- Throw Down Your Heart: The Complete Africa Sessions
  - Béla Fleck, compilation producer; Richard Dodd, mastering engineer (Béla Fleck)

=== Production, non-classical ===
Best Engineered Album, Non-Classical

- **Hyperspace**
  - **Drew Brown, Andrew Coleman, Shawn Everett, Șerban Ghenea, David Greenbaum, Jaycen Joshua, Beck Hansen & Mike Larson, engineers; Randy Merrill, mastering engineer (Beck)**
- Black Hole Rainbow
  - Shawn Everett & Ivan Wayman, engineers; Bob Ludwig, mastering engineer (Devon Gilfillian)
- Expectations
  - Gary Paczosa & Mike Robinson, engineers; Paul Blakemore, mastering engineer (Katie Pruitt)
- Jaime
  - Shawn Everett, engineer; Shawn Everett, mastering engineer (Brittany Howard)
- 25 Trips
  - Shani Gandhi & Gary Paczosa, engineers; Adam Grover, mastering engineer (Sierra Hull)

Producer of the Year, Non-Classical

- **Andrew Watt**
  - **"Break My Heart" (Dua Lipa)**
  - **"Me and My Guitar" (A Boogie wit da Hoodie)**
  - **"Midnight Sky" (Miley Cyrus)**
  - **"Old Me" (5 Seconds of Summer)**
  - **"Ordinary Man" (Ozzy Osbourne featuring Elton John)**
  - **"Take What You Want" (Post Malone featuring Ozzy Osbourne & Travis Scott)**
  - **"Under The Graveyard" (Ozzy Osbourne)**
- Jack Antonoff
  - "August" (Taylor Swift)
  - Gaslighter (The Chicks)
  - "Holy Terrain" (FKA Twigs featuring Future)
  - "Mirrorball" (Taylor Swift)
  - "This Is Me Trying" (Taylor Swift)
  - "Together" (Sia)
- Dan Auerbach
  - Cypress Grove (Jimmy "Duck" Holmes)
  - El Dorado (Marcus King)
  - Is Thomas Callaway (CeeLo Green)
  - Singing for My Supper (Early James)
  - Solid Gold Sounds (Kendell Marvel)
  - Years (John Anderson)
- Dave Cobb
  - "Backbone" (Kaleo)
  - The Balladeer (Lori McKenna)
  - Boneshaker (Airbourne)
  - Down Home Christmas (Oak Ridge Boys)
  - The Highwomen (The Highwomen)
  - "I Remember Everything" (John Prine)
  - Reunions (Jason Isbell and the 400 Unit)
  - "The Spark" (William Prince)
  - "You're Still the One" (Teddy Swims)
- Flying Lotus
  - It Is What It Is (Thundercat)

Best Remixed Recording

- **"Roses (Imanbek Remix)"**
  - **Imanbek Zeikenov, remixer (Saint Jhn)**
- "Do You Ever (RAC Mix)"
  - RAC, remixer (Phil Good)
- "Imaginary Friends (Morgan Page Remix)"
  - Morgan Page, remixer (Deadmau5)
- "Praying for You (Louie Vega Main Remix)"
  - Louie Vega, remixer (Jasper Street Co.)
- "Young & Alive (Bazzi vs. Haywyre Remix)"
  - Haywyre, remixer (Bazzi)

=== Production, immersive audio ===
Best Immersive Audio Album

- **Soundtrack of the American Soldier**
  - **Leslie Ann Jones, immersive mix engineer; Michael Romanowski, immersive mastering engineer; Dan Merceruio, immersive producer (Jim R. Keene and the United States Army Field Band)**
- Bolstad: Tomba Sonora
  - Morten Lindberg (Stemmeklang)
- Dear Future Self (Dolby Atmos Mixes)
  - Fritz Hilpert, immersive mix engineer; Jason Banks, Fritz Hilpert and David Zeigler, immersive mastering engineers; Tom Ammerman, Arno Kammermeier and Walter Merziger, immersive producers (Booka Shade)
- Fryd
  - Morten Lindberg (Tove Ramlo-Ystad and Cantus)
- Mutt Slang II - A Wake of Sorrows Engulfed in Rage
  - Elliot Scheiner, immersive mix engineer; Darcy Proper, immersive mastering engineer; Alain Mallet and Elliot Scheiner, immersive producers (Alain Mallet)

=== Production, classical ===
Best Engineered Album, Classical

- **"Shostakovich: Symphony No. 13, 'Babi Yar'"**
  - **David Frost & Charlie Post, engineers; Silas Brown, mastering engineer (Riccardo Muti & Chicago Symphony Orchestra)**
- "Danielpour: The Passion of Yeshua"
  - Bernd Gottinger, engineer (JoAnn Falletta, James K. Bass, Adam Luebke, UCLA Chamber Singers, Buffalo Philharmonic Orchestra & Buffalo Philharmonic Chorus)
- "Gershwin: Porgy and Bess"
  - David Frost & John Kerswell, engineers; Silas Brown, mastering engineer (David Robertson, Eric Owens, Angel Blue, Metropolitan Opera Orchestra & Chorus)
- "Hynes: Fields"
  - Kyle Pyke, engineer; Jesse Lewis & Kyle Pyke, mastering engineers (Devonté Hynes & Third Coast Percussion)
- "Ives: Complete Symphonies"
  - Alexander Lipay & Dmitriy Lipay, engineers; Alexander Lipay & Dmitriy Lipay, mastering engineers (Gustavo Dudamel & Los Angeles Philharmonic)

Producer of the Year, Classical

- **David Frost**
  - **Beethoven: Piano Sonatas, Vol. 9 (Jonathan Biss)**
  - **Gershwin: Porgy And Bess (David Robertson, Eric Owens, Angel Blue, Metropolitan Opera Orchestra & Chorus)**
  - **Gluck: Orphée & Eurydice (Harry Bicket, Dmitry Korchak, Andriana Chuchman, Lauren Snouffer, Lyric Opera Of Chicago Orchestra & Chorus)**
  - **Holst: The Planets; The Perfect Fool (Michael Stern & Kansas City Symphony)**
  - **Muhly: Marnie (Robert Spano, Isabel Leonard, Christopher Maltman, Denyce Graves, Iestyn Davies, Janis Kelly, Metropolitan Opera Orchestra & Chorus)**
  - **Schubert: Piano Sonatas, D. 845, D. 894, D. 958, D. 960 (Shai Wosner)**
  - **Shostakovich: Symphony No. 13, 'Babi Yar' (Riccardo Muti, Alexey Tikhomirov, Chicago Symphony Orchestra & Chorus)**
- Blanton Alspaugh
  - Aspects of America (Carlos Kalmar & Oregon Symphony)
  - Blessed Art Thou Among Women (Peter Jermihov, Katya Lukianov & PaTRAM Institute Singers)
  - Dvořák: Symphony No. 9; Copland: Billy The Kid (Gianandrea Noseda & National Symphony Orchestra)
  - Glass: The Fall Of The House Of Usher (Joseph Li, Nicholas Nestorak, Madison Leonard, Jonas Hacker, Ben Edquist, Matthew Adam Fleisher & Wolf Trap Opera)
  - Kahane: Emergency Shelter Intake Form (Alicia Hall Moran, Gabriel Kahane, Carlos Kalmar & Oregon Symphony)
  - Kastalsky: Requiem (Leonard Slatkin, Steven Fox, Benedict Sheehan, Charles Bruffy, Cathedral Choral Society, The Clarion Choir, The Saint Tikhon Choir, Kansas City Chorale & Orchestra Of St. Luke's)
  - Massenet: Thaïs (Andrew Davis, Joshua Hopkins, Andrew Staples, Erin Wall, Toronto Mendelssohn Choir & Toronto Symphony Orchestra)
  - Smyth: The Prison (Sarah Brailey, Dashon Burton, James Blachly & Experiential Orchestra)
  - Woolf, L.P.: Fire And Flood (Julian Wachner, Matt Haimovitz & Choir Of Trinity Wall Street)
- Jesse Lewis
  - Gunn: The Ascendant (Roomful Of Teeth)
  - Harrison, M.: Just Constellations (Roomful Of Teeth)
  - Her Own Wings (Willamette Valley Chamber Music Festival)
  - Hynes: Fields (Devonté Hynes & Third Coast Percussion)
  - Lang, D.: Love Fail (Beth Willer & Lorelei Ensemble)
  - Mazzoli: Proving Up (Christopher Rountree, Opera Omaha & International Contemporary Ensemble)
  - Sharlat: Spare The Rod! (NOW Ensemble)
  - Soul House (Hub New Music)
  - Wherein Lies The Good (The Westerlies)
- Dmitry Lipay
  - Adams, J.: Must The Devil Have All The Good Tunes? (Yuja Wang, Gustavo Dudamel & Los Angeles Philharmonic)
  - Cipullo: The Parting (Alastair Willis, Laura Strickling, Catherine Cook, Michael Mayes & Music Of Remembrance)
  - Ives: Complete Symphonies (Gustavo Dudamel & Los Angeles Philharmonic)
  - LA Phil 100 – The Los Angeles Philharmonic Centennial Birthday Gala (Gustavo Dudamel & Los Angeles Philharmonic)
  - Langgaard: Prelude To Antichrist; Strauss: An Alpine Symphony (Thomas Dausgaard & Seattle Symphony Orchestra)
  - Nielsen: Symphony No. 1 & Symphony No. 2, 'The Four Temperaments' (Thomas Dausgaard & Seattle Symphony)
- Elaine Martone
  - Bound For The Promised Land (Robert M. Franklin, Steven Darsey, Jessye Norman & Taylor Branch)
  - Dawn (Shachar Israel)
  - Gandolfi, Prior & Oliverio: Orchestral Works (Robert Spano & Atlanta Symphony Orchestra)
  - Singing In The Dead Of Night (Eighth Blackbird)
  - Whitacre: The Sacred Veil (Eric Whitacre, Grant Gershon & Los Angeles Master Chorale)

=== Classical ===
Best Orchestral Performance

- **"Ives: Complete Symphonies"**
  - **Gustavo Dudamel, conductor (Los Angeles Philharmonic)**
- "Aspects of America – Pulitzer Edition"
  - Carlos Kalmar, conductor (Oregon Symphony)
- "Concurrence"
  - Daníel Bjarnason, conductor (Iceland Symphony Orchestra)
- "Copland: Symphony No. 3"
  - Michael Tilson Thomas, conductor (San Francisco Symphony)
- "Lutosławski: Symphonies No. 2 & 3"
  - Hannu Lintu, conductor (Finnish Radio Symphony Orchestra)

Best Opera Recording

- **"Gershwin: Porgy and Bess"**
  - **David Robertson, conductor; Angel Blue & Eric Owens; David Frost, producer (The Metropolitan Opera Orchestra; The Metropolitan Opera Chorus)**
- "Dello Joio: The Trial at Rouen"
  - Gil Rose, conductor; Heather Buck & Stephen Powell; Gil Rose, producer (Boston Modern Orchestra Project; Odyssey Opera Chorus)
- "Floyd, C: Prince of Players"
  - William Boggs, conductor; Keith Phares & Kate Royal; Blanton Alspaugh, producer (Milwaukee Symphony Orchestra; Florentine Opera Chorus)
- "Handel: Agrippina"
  - Maxim Emelyanychev, conductor; Joyce DiDonato; Daniel Zalay, producer (Il Pomo D'Oro)
- "Zemlinsky: Der Zwerg"
  - Donald Runnicles, conductor; David Butt Philip & Elena Tsallagova; Peter Ghirardini & Erwin Stürzer, producers (Orchestra of the Deutsche Oper Berlin; Chorus of the Deutsche Oper Berlin)

Best Choral Performance

- **"Danielpour: The Passion of Yessuah"**
  - **JoAnn Falletta, conductor; James K. Bass & Adam Luebke, chorus masters (James K. Bass, J'Nai Bridges, Timothy Fallon, Kenneth Overton, Hila Plitmann & Matthew Worth; Buffalo Philharmonic Orchestra; Buffalo Philharmonic Chorus & UCLA Chamber Singers)**
- "Carthage"
  - Donald Nally, conductor (The Crossing)
- "Kastalski: Requiem"
  - Leonard Slatkin, conductor; Charles Bruffy, Steven Fox & Benedict Sheehan, chorus masters (Joseph Charles Beutel & Anna Dennis; Orchestra Of St. Luke's; Cathedral Choral Society, The Clarion Choir, Kansas City Chorale & The Saint Tikhon Choir)
- "Moravec: Sanctuary Road"
  - Kent Tritle, conductor (Joshua Blue, Raehann Bryce-Davis, Dashon Burton, Malcolm J. Merriweather & Laquita Mitchell; Oratorio Society Of New York Orchestra; Oratorio Society Of New York Chorus)
- "Once Upon a Time"
  - Matthew Guard, conductor (Sarah Walker; Skylark Vocal Ensemble)

Best Chamber Music/Small Ensemble Performance

- **"Contemporary Voices" – Pacifica Quartet**
- "Healing Modes" – Brooklyn Rider
- "Hearne, T,: Place" – Ted Hearne, Steven Bradshaw, Sophia Byrd, Josephine Lee, Isaiah Robinson, Sol Ruiz, Ayanna Woods & Place Orchestra
- "Hynes: Fields" – Devonté Hynes & Third Coast Percussion
- "The Schumann Quartets" – Dover Quartet

Best Classical Instrumental Solo

- **"Theofanidis: Concerto for Viola and Chamber Orchestra"**
  - **Richard O'Neill; David Alan Miller, conductor (Albany Symphony)**
- "Adés: Concerto for Piano and Orchestra"
  - Kirill Gerstein; Thomas Adès, conductor (Boston Symphony Orchestra)
- "Beethoven: Complete Piano Sonatas"
  - Igor Levit
- "Bohemian Tales"
  - Augustin Hadelich; Jakub Hrůša, conductor (Charles Owen; Symphonieorchester Des Bayerischen Rundfunks)
- "Destination Rachmaninov – Arrival"
  - Daniil Trifonov; Yannick Nézet-Séguin, conductor (The Philadelphia Orchestra)

Best Classical Solo Vocal Album

- **"Smyth: The Prison"**
  - **Sarah Brailey & Dashon Burton; James Blachly, conductor (Experiential Chorus; Experiential Orchestra)**
- "American Composers at Play – William Bolcom, Ricky Ian Gordon, Lori Laitman, John Musto"
  - Stephen Powell (Attacca Quartet, William Bolcom, Ricky Ian Gordon, Lori Laitman, John Musto, Charles Neidich & Jason Vieaux)
- "Clairières – Songs by Lili & Nadia Boulanger"
  - Nicholas Phan; Myra Huang, accompanist
- "Farinelli"
  - Cecilia Bartoli; Giovanni Antonini, conductor (Il Giardino Armonico)
- "A Lad's Love"
  - Brian Giebler; Steven McGhee, accompanist (Katie Hyun, Michael Katz, Jessica Meyer, Reginald Mobley & Ben Russell)

Best Classical Compendium

- **"Thomas, M.T.: From the Diary of Anne Frank & Meditations on Rilke"**
  - **Isabel Leonard; Michael Tilson Thomas, conductor; Jack Vad, producer**
- "Adès Conducts Adès"
  - Mark Stone & Christianne Stotijn; Thomas Adès, conductor; Nick Squire, producer
- "Saariaho: Graal Théâtre; Circle Map, Neiges, Vers Toi Qui Es Si Loin"
  - Clément Mao-Takacs, conductor; Hans Kipfer, producer
- "Serebrier: Symphonic Bach Variations; Laments and Hallelujahs; Flute Concerto"
  - José Serebrier, conductor; Jens Braun, producer
- "Woolf, L.P.: Fire and Blood"
  - Matt Haimovitz; Julian Wachner, conductor; Blanton Alspaugh, producer

Best Contemporary Classical Composition

- **"Rouse: Symphony No. 5"**
  - **Christopher Rouse, composer (Giancarlo Guerrero & Nashville Symphony)**
- "Adès: Concerto for Piano and Orchestra"
  - Thomas Adès, composer (Kirill Gerstein, Thomas Adès & Boston Symphony Orchestra)
- "Danielpour: The Passion of Yeshua"
  - Richard Danielpour, composer (JoAnn Falletta, James K. Bass, Adam Luebke, UCLA Chamber Singers, Buffalo Philharmonic Orchestra & Buffalo Philharmonic Chorus)
- "Floyd, C.: Prince of Players"
  - Carlisle Floyd, composer (William Boggs, Kate Royal, Keith Phares, Florentine Opera Chorus & Milwaukee Symphony Orchestra)
- "Hearne, T.: Place"
  - Ted Hearne, composer (Ted Hearne, Steven Bradshaw, Sophia Byrd, Josephine Lee, Isaiah Robinson, Sol Ruiz, Ayanna Woods & Place Orchestra)

=== Music video/film ===
Best Music Video

- **"Brown Skin Girl" – Beyoncé, Saint Jhn & Wizkid featuring Blue Ivy Carter**
  - **Beyoncé Knowles-Carter & Jenn Nkiru, video directors; Lauren Baker, Astrid Edwards, Nathan Scherrer & Erinn Williams, video producers**
- "Life Is Good" – Future featuring Drake
  - Julien Christian Lutz, video director; Harv Glazer, video producer
- "Lockdown" – Anderson .Paak
  - Dave Meyers, video director; Nathan Scherrer, video producer
- "Adore You" – Harry Styles
  - Dave Meyers, video director; Nathan Scherrer, video producer
- "Goliath" – Woodkid
  - Yoann Lemoine, video director; Horace de Gunzbourg, video producer

Best Music Film

- **Linda Ronstadt: The Sound of My Voice – Linda Ronstadt**
  - **Rob Epstein & Jeffrey Friedman, video directors; Michele Farinola & James Keach, video producers**
- Beastie Boys Story – Beastie Boys
  - Spike Jonze, video director; Amanda Adelson, Jason Baum & Spike Jonze, video producers
- Black Is King – Beyoncé
  - Emmanuel Adjei, Blitz Bazawule, Beyoncé Knowles Carter & Kwasi Fordjour, video directors; Lauren Baker, Akin Omotoso, Nathan Scherrer, Jeremy Sullivan & Erinn Williams, video producers
- We Are Freestyle Love Supreme – Freestyle Love Supreme
  - Andrew Fried, video director; Andrew Fried, Jill Furman, Thomas Kail, Lin-Manuel Miranda, Sarina Roma, Jenny Steingart & Jon Steingart, video producers
- That Little Ol' Band From Texas – ZZ Top
  - Sam Dunn, video director; Scot McFadyen, video producer

== Special Merit Awards ==
=== Lifetime Achievement Award ===
- Grandmaster Flash and the Furious Five
- Lionel Hampton
- Marilyn Horne
- Salt-N-Pepa
- Selena
- Talking Heads

=== Trustees Award ===
- Ed Cherney
- Benny Golson
- Kenny "Babyface" Edmonds

=== Technical Grammy Award ===
- Daniel Weiss

=== Music Educator Award ===
- Jeffrey Murdock (of University of Arkansas in Fayetteville, Arkansas)

== Multiple nominations and awards ==
The following received multiple nominations:

Nine:

- Beyoncé

Six:

- Dua Lipa
- Roddy Ricch
- Taylor Swift

Five:

- Brittany Howard

Four:

- John Beasley
- Justin Bieber
- Phoebe Bridgers
- DaBaby
- Billie Eilish
- David Frost
- Megan Thee Stallion

Three:

- Thomas Adès
- Jhené Aiko
- Blanton Alspaugh
- Ingrid Andress
- Denisia Andrews
- Fiona Apple
- Louis Bell
- Black Pumas
- Mike Bozzi
- Chloe x Halle
- Jacob Collier
- Brittany Coney
- Derek Dixie
- Doja Cat
- Drake
- Frank Dukes
- Shawn Everett
- Adam Feeney
- Finneas
- H.E.R.
- Jay-Z
- Kaytranada
- Akil King
- Miranda Lambert
- Emily Lazar
- Post Malone
- Harry Styles

Two:

- Christian Scott Atunde Adjuah
- Caroline Ailin
- Jack Antonoff
- Bad Bunny
- Jon Batiste
- Beck
- Brian Blade
- Bonny Light Horseman
- Stephen Bray
- Brandi Carlile
- Cody Carnes
- Brandy Clark
- Gerald Clayton
- Chick Corea
- D Smoke
- Aaron Dessner
- Ricky Dillard
- Disclosure
- Frankfurt Radio Big Band
- Lady Gaga
- Chris Gehringer
- Șerban Ghenea
- Robert Glasper
- JJ Golden
- Josh Gudwin
- Hildur Guðnadóttir
- Haim
- Natalie Hemby
- Tame Impala
- J. White Did It
- Sarah Jarosz
- Ian Kirkpatrick
- Kim "Kaydence" Krysiuk
- Remy Le Boeuf
- Lecrae
- John Legend
- Adrianne Lenker
- Colin Leonard
- Jesse Lewis
- Lil Baby
- Lil Durk
- Dmitriy Lipay
- Little Big Town
- Skip Marley
- Manny Marroquin
- Christian McBride
- Randy Merrill
- Dave Meyers
- Arturo O'Farrill
- Anderson .Paak
- Grace Potter
- John Prine
- Matthew Ramsey
- Joshua Redman
- The Secret Sisters
- SethinTheKitchen
- 30 Roc
- Michael Tilson Thomas
- Rickie "Caso" Tice
- Billy Walsh
- We the Kingdom
- Tauren Wells
- Stuart White
- Lucinda Williams

The following received multiple awards:

Four:

- Beyoncé

Three:

- David Frost
- Megan Thee Stallion

Two:

- Fiona Apple
- Chick Corea
- Billie Eilish
- Finneas
- Șerban Ghenea
- H.E.R.
- Kaytranada
- Randy Merrill

== In Memoriam ==
Musical artists and industry personnel who had died in 2020 and early 2021 were included in a memorial reel aired during the Grammy telecast. At least 800 individuals were considered by producer Ben Winston for the segment. The Recording Academy was criticized by fans of Naya Rivera, Benny Mardones, Hal Ketchum, Riley Gale, and Frankie Banali for excluding their names from the broadcast, although all of them were included on a longer list of names posted on the Grammys website.

The segment dedicated to Eddie Van Halen was criticized by fans, former bandmates and other figures within the hard rock and heavy metal community who felt that the brief seconds-long tribute was an insult to the guitarist's influence and legacy. Van Halen's son Wolfgang Van Halen revealed that he declined the Academy's offer to play "Eruption" for the segment out of respect for his father, believing that the "In Memoriam" would feature more songs. While disappointed with the brief tribute, Wolfgang was "hurt the most" by Eddie not being mentioned among other recently deceased artists remembered at the beginning of the show, attributing the mishap to the declining mainstream popularity in rock music and the Academy's historical lack of interest in the genre. However, Jem Aswad of Variety defended the tribute, opining that longer tributes featuring cover artists still would have failed to meet expectations and praised the subtext behind the segment, which featured a spotlight on Van Halen's signature Frankenstrat guitar with a video of the guitarist playing in the background, that Van Halen's talent could never be replicated.

- Bill Withers
- Betty Wright
- K. T. Oslin
- Tony Rice
- Little Richard
- Eddie Van Halen
- Mary Wilson
- Bonnie Pointer
- Mac Davis
- Helen Reddy
- McCoy Tyner
- Charlie Daniels
- Kenny Rogers
- Chick Corea
- Bucky Pizzarelli
- Ellis Marsalis Jr.
- Jan Howard
- Johnny Nash
- Johnny Pacheco
- Sophie
- Charley Pride
- John "Ecstasy" Fletcher
- Bruce Swedien
- Jim Weatherly
- Johnny Mandel
- Adam Schlesinger
- Ennio Morricone
- Armando Manzanero
- Jimmie Rodgers
- Trini Lopez
- Toots Hibbert
- Prince Markie Dee
- Florian Schneider
- Sylvain Sylvain
- Paul Barrere
- MF Doom
- Peter Green
- Leslie West
- Emitt Rhodes
- Pop Smoke
- Steve Priest
- Ronald Bell
- Ari Gold
- Julian Bream
- John Prine
- Jeffrey W. Greenberg
- Spencer Davis
- Rupert Neve
- Bunny Wailer
- Hal Willner
- Gerry Marsden
- Quinn "Spicoli" Coleman
- Jerry Jeff Walker
- Harold Reid
- Rita Houston
- Joseph Shabalala
- Billy Joe Shaver
- Joe Diffie
- Keith Olsen
- Andre Harrell

A list that included additional artists not featured in the memoriam reel was published on the Grammy website on March 15, 2021.

== Reception ==
=== Pre-ceremony ===
Following the release of the nominations, Canadian singer the Weeknd accused the Grammys of corruption after he failed to receive any nominations. Based on the success of his album, After Hours, the Weeknd had been expected by many critics and publications to receive a large number of nominations, including Album of the Year as well as several nods for his single "Blinding Lights". Expressing his disappointment, the Weeknd tweeted "The Grammys remain corrupt. You owe me, my fans and the industry transparency...". He further explained that he was expecting nominations due to discussions between his team and the Grammys to perform at the ceremony but it was later reported by Rolling Stone that these discussions broke down due to the Weeknd also performing at the Super Bowl LV halftime show. In response, the Grammys released a statement saying that they "empathized" with the Weeknd's disappointment but that some "deserving" artists miss out every year. Recording Academy president Harvey Mason Jr. later expanded on this by explaining that "we understand that the Weeknd is disappointed at not being nominated. I was surprised and can empathise with what he's feeling. Unfortunately, every year, there are fewer nominations than the number of deserving artists. To be clear, voting in all categories ended well before the Weeknd's performance at the Super Bowl was announced, so in no way could it have affected the nomination process". Several days later, the Weeknd stated that "I personally don't care anymore. I have three Grammys, which mean nothing to me now, obviously. I suck at giving speeches anyways. Forget awards shows. It's not like, 'Oh, I want the Grammy!' It's just that this happened, and I'm down to get in front of the fire, as long as it never happens again".

American singer Halsey spoke out in solidarity with the Weeknd after her 2020 album, Manic, received no nominations. Taking to Instagram, Halsey wrote "The Grammys are an elusive process. It can often be about behind the scenes private performances, knowing the right people, campaigning through the grapevine, with the right handshake and 'bribes' that can be just ambiguous enough to pass as 'not bribes.'" The singer went on to share that speaking out against The Grammys could very well get an artist blacklisted. Halsey, who only has 2 nominations throughout her entire career, was the center of conversation when her song "Without Me", which reached number one on the US Billboard Hot 100, was passed up for a nomination at the 62nd Annual Grammy Awards.

Justin Bieber expressed his disappointment with the academy following his album Changes receiving nominations in the Pop field rather than the R&B field. He explained that he is "very meticulous and intentional about my music. With that being said I set out to make an R&B album. Changes was and is an R&B album. It is not being acknowledged as an R&B album which is very strange to me". The Grammys later responded to Bieber, stating that "we always want to respect the artist's wishes. Art's a funny thing because it's so subjective, and at the Academy our goal is to honor excellence. At some point, decisions have to be made as to how to compare different things, and it is a very tough process and one I don't think we get right every time. We use our best efforts to get people where they wanna be and where they should be and try to evaluate them as best as we can. If he felt that was that type of a record, then, you know... I'll just leave it at that. We try really hard to make sure people's art is respected and evaluated in the right category".

Five days before the ceremony, British artist Zayn Malik posted a tweet criticizing the Grammys and their voting procedures stating that "unless you shake hands and send gifts, there's no nomination considerations. Next year I'll send you a basket of confectionary". After confusion from fans and the media, who noted that Malik's third album, Nobody Is Listening, was ineligible for the 63rd Grammy Awards as it was released after the eligibility period ended in August, Malik stated his intentions in a follow-up tweet, explaining that his prior post was "not personal or about eligibility but was about the need for inclusion and the lack of transparency of the nomination process and the space that creates and allows favoritism, racism, and networking [sic] politics to influence the voting process".

=== Ceremony ===
During the ceremony, Cardi B and Megan Thee Stallion performed the song "WAP." Grammys host Trevor Noah prefaced the performance with, "If you have small children in the room, just tell them it's a song about giving a cat a bath", and the chorus "wet and gushy," was changed to "wet, wet, wet". Billboard ranked it as the best performance of the ceremony, commenting that "this had to be one of the most insane television debut performances of all time." Music critic Jon Caramanica called the performance "wildly and charmingly salacious, frisky and genuine in a way that the Grammys has rarely if ever made room for". However, the performance received criticism for being "non-family-friendly".

=== Viewership ===
The broadcast received an average of 8.8 million viewers in the United States, with a 2.1 Nielsen rating among adults aged 18 to 49, marking a more than 50 percent decline from the previous year's ceremony, and making it the least-viewed telecast in the history of the Grammys. Conversely, the live streaming audience for the show was up 83 percent over 2020 and the hashtag, #Grammys trended for 18 hours and peaked in the number one position.
