= Black Pumas (album) =

Studio album by Black Pumas
- Released: June 21, 2019
- Genre: Psychedelic soul
- Length: 39:41
- Label: ATO
- Producer: Jon Kaplan; Adrian Quesada

Black Pumas chronology
Black Pumas (2019)	Chronicles of a Diamond (2023)

Singles from Black Pumas
- 1. "Black Moon Rising" Released: August 24, 2018; 2. "Fire" Released: March 6, 2019; 3. "Colors" Released: April 16, 2019

Professional ratings
Review scores
Source	Rating
Pitchfork	7.0/10

Black Pumas is the debut album by American band Black Pumas. It was released on June 21, 2019, through ATO Records. The deluxe edition was nominated for Album of the Year at the 63rd Annual Grammy Awards on November 24, 2020, while "Colors" received two nominations for Record of the Year and Best American Roots Performance.

The album reached its peak of number 86 on the US Billboard 200 with 10,000 album equivalent units.

== Track listing ==
Black Pumas track listing
No.	Title	Writer(s)	Length
1.	"Black Moon Rising"	Adrian Quesada; Eric Burton	3:41
2.	"Colors"	Burton	4:06
3.	"Know You Better"	Quesada; Burton	4:09
4.	"Fire"	Quesada; Burton	4:06
5.	"OCT 33"	Burton	4:49
6.	"Stay Gold"	Burton	4:35
7.	"Old Man"	Quesada; Burton	3:17
8.	"Confines"	Quesada; Burton	3:09
9.	"Touch the Sky"	Quesada; Burton	4:27
10.	"Sweet Conversations"	Burton; Joshua Blue	3:22
Total length:			39:41

Deluxe edition bonus tracks
No.	Title	Writer(s)	Length
1.	"Fast Car"	Tracy Chapman	5:41
2.	"I'm Ready"	Quesada; Burton	3:59
3.	"Red Rover"	Burton	3:53
4.	"Black Cat"	Quesada; Burton	3:16
5.	"Politicians in My Eyes"	Bobby Dean Hackney	3:52
6.	"Colors" (live in studio)	Burton	6:23
7.	"Oct 33" (live in studio)	Burton	5:44
8.	"Confines" (live in studio)	Quesada; Burton	4:49
9.	"Know You Better" (live at C-Boys)	Quesada; Burton	5:57
10.	"Eleanor Rigby"	John Lennon; Paul McCartney	5:36
11.	"Ain't No Love in the Heart of the City"	Daniel Walsh; Harvey Price	4:18
Total length:			53:28

== Personnel ==
=== Black Pumas ===
- Eric Burton – vocals (all), guitar (1:2, 1:5, 1:6, 1:9, 2:1, 2:2), keyboards (2:3)
- Adrian Quesada – guitar (1:1–1:9, 2:1–2:11), keyboards (1:1–1:4, 1:7, 2:3), bass guitar (2:3)

=== Additional musicians ===
By first appearance, then alphabetically:

- Alexis Buffum – violin (1:1, 1:5, 2:7, 2:8)
- Scott Davis – bass guitar (1:1, 1:3, 1:4, 1:7, 2:2, 2:4, 2:6, 2:10)
- Trevor Nealon – keyboards (1:1, 1:3, 1:4, 1:7, 1:8, 2:2, 2:4)
- John Speice – drums (1:1), bass guitar (1:8, 2:2, 2:4)
- Stephen Bidwell – drums (1:2, 1:5, 1:6, 1:9, 2:5–2:11)
- Brendan Bond – bass guitar (1:2, 1:5, 1:6, 1:9, 2:5, 2:7–2:9, 2:11)
- Lauren Cervantes – backing vocals (1:2–1:9, 2:3–2:11)
- Spencer Garland – keyboards (1:2, 1:5, 1:6, 1:9)
- Angela Miller – backing vocals (1:2–1:9, 2:3–2:11), tambourine (2:2)
- Adrienne Short – violin (1:2)
- Art Brown – tenor saxophone (1:3, 1:4)
- Elijah Clark – trombone (1:3, 1:4)
- JJ Johnson – drums (1:3, 1:4, 1:7, 1:8)
- R. Scott Morning – trumpet (1:4)
- J.B. Flatt – string arrangements (1:5)
- Jenavieve Varga – violin (1:8, 2:2)
- Josh Levy – baritone saxophone (1:9, 2:11)
- Derek Phelps – trumpet (1:9)
- Ulrican Williams – trombone (1:9)
- Josh Blue – drums and guitar (1:10)
- Todd Simon – trumpet (2:4)
- JaRon Marshall – keyboards (2:5–2:11)
- Nora Karakousoglou – cello (2:7, 2:8)
- Leah Nelson – viola (2:7, 2:8)
- Leigh Wallenhaupt – violin (2:7, 2:8)
- Gilbert Elorreaga – trumpet (2:11)
- Mark Gonzales – trombone (2:11)

=== Production ===
- Adrian Quesada – producer, engineer (1:1–1:10, 2:1–2:4), mixing (1:1–1:10, 2:1–2:5, 2:7–2:9, 2:11)
- Marcel Andrie Pean – assistant engineer (1:1–1:10)
- Anthony Cazade – engineer (2:5)
- Nicolas Quéré – engineer (2:5)
- Jacob Sciba – engineer (2:6, 2:10)
- Stuart Sikes – engineer (2:7, 2:8)
- Alexander DuBois – engineer (2:9)
- Erik Wofford – engineer (2:11)
- Jon Kaplan – mixing (2:6, 2:10)
- JJ Golden – mastering

== Charts ==
Chart performance of Black Pumas
Chart (2019–2022)	Peak position
Belgian Albums (Ultratop Flanders)	57
Belgian Albums (Ultratop Wallonia)	79
Dutch Albums (Album Top 100)	46
French Albums (SNEP)	112
German Albums (Offizielle Top 100)	51
Spanish Albums (PROMUSICAE)	81
Swiss Albums (Schweizer Hitparade)	58
US Billboard 200	86
US Independent Albums (Billboard)	11
US Americana/Folk Albums (Billboard)	4

== Certifications ==
Certifications for Black Pumas
Region	Certification	Certified units/sales
France (SNEP)	Gold	50,000^{‡}
^{‡} Sales+streaming figures based on certification alone.
