= Black Pumas =

American psychedelic soul band

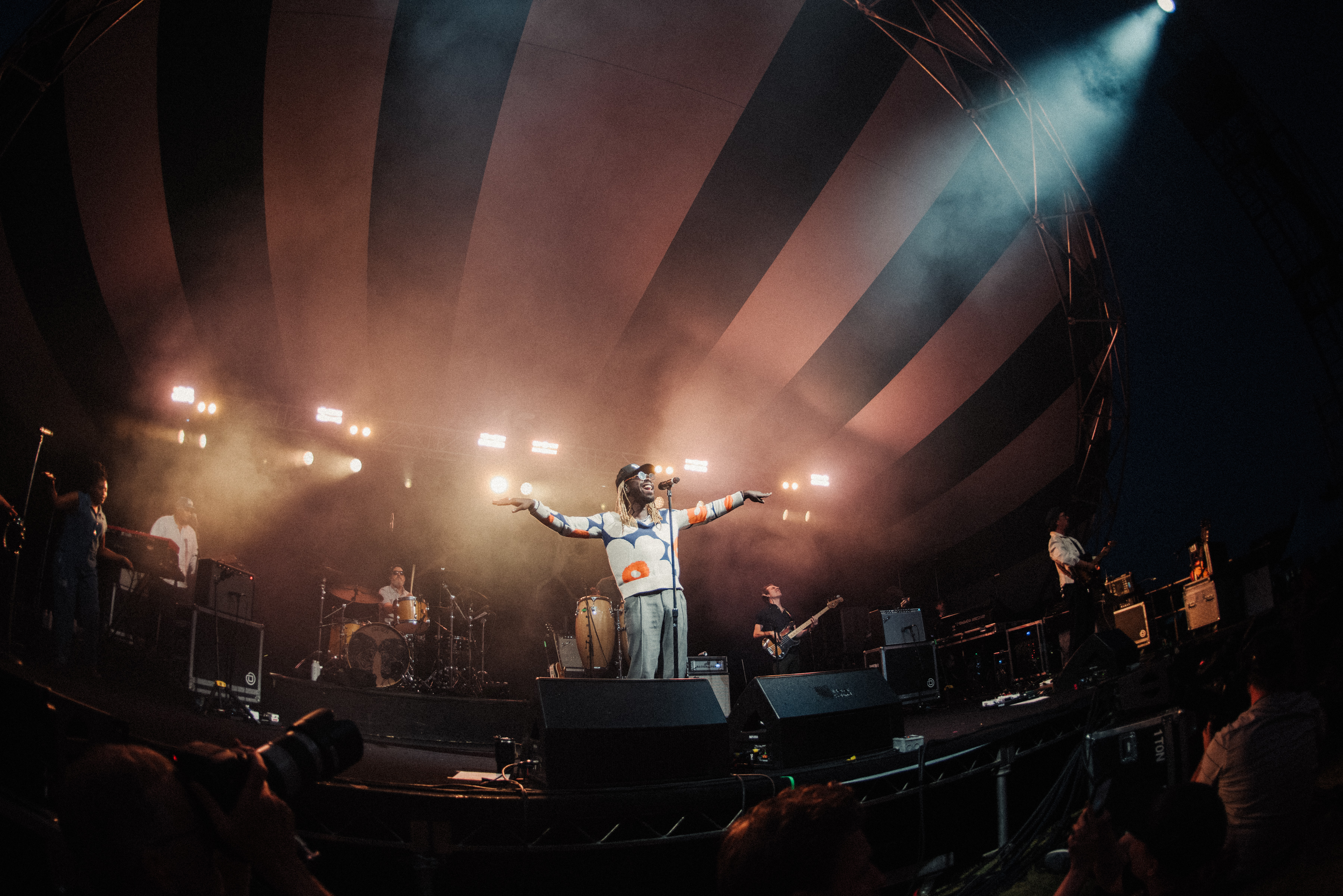
- Black Pumas in 2024

Background information
- Origin: Austin, Texas, U.S.
- Genres: Psychedelic soul; R&B; soul
- Years active: 2017–present
- Label: ATO
- Members: Eric Burton; Adrian Quesada
- Website: blackpumas.com

Black Pumas is an American psychedelic soul band based in Austin, Texas, led by singer/songwriter Eric Burton and guitarist/producer Adrian Quesada. The group received its first Grammy Award nomination in 2020 for Best New Artist.

== History ==
In 2017, singer and songwriter Eric Burton made his way from California to Texas. Born in the San Fernando Valley, he grew up singing in church and then got heavily involved in musical theater. He started busking at the Santa Monica Pier, where he brought in a few hundred dollars a day and developed his performance skills. Burton traveled through the Western states, studying music at New Mexico State University in Las Cruces, New Mexico, before deciding to settle down and busk in Austin, Texas. Burton had previously been a contestant on the eleventh season of American Idol, being eliminated in the Hollywood rounds.

In the meantime, Grammy Award-winning guitarist and producer Adrian Quesada was looking to collaborate with someone new. Through a mutual friend, Quesada connected with Burton. Quesada felt that Burton's vocals were a match for the retro-funk- and R&B-flavored tracks Quesada had been working on, and the two joined forces in 2018 as Black Pumas.

Quesada was a member of Latin funk band Grupo Fantasma when it won the Grammy Award for Best Latin Rock, Urban or Alternative Album for the 2010 album El Existential, and when it was previously nominated for the same award in 2008 for Sonidos Gold.

Working out their material both in the studio and on-stage during a weekly residency at Austin's C-Boys Heart & Soul Bar, they signed a deal with ATO Records and released a pair of singles, "Black Moon Rising" and "Fire".

== Career ==
The duo released their debut album, Black Pumas, on June 21, 2019. They performed at South by Southwest in 2019 and won a best new band trophy at the 2019 Austin Music Awards. On November 20, 2019, they were nominated for a Grammy Award for Best New Artist.

The album received acclaim from Rolling Stone, who praised "the tireless, charismatic energy of singer Eric Burton", and Pitchfork, who wrote "The duo's flair for drama is so stirring, they can seem acutely cinematic", as well as NPR, The Fader, The Guardian, Billboard, Essence and Headliner Magazine, among others.

Black Pumas made their network TV debut on CBS This Morning and performed "Colors" on Jimmy Kimmel Live! which proved to be their breakout, along with a taping on season 45 of Austin City Limits. The band's single "Colors" later reached number one on AAA radio.

In 2020, the band performed on The Ellen DeGeneres Show, The Tonight Show Starring Jimmy Fallon, Late Night with Seth Meyers and The Late Show with Stephen Colbert who premiered their live cover of Tracy Chapman’s "Fast Car".

The band has sold out multiple tours across North America and Europe. In their hometown of Austin, Texas, Black Pumas became the first band to sell out four consecutive shows at Stubbs, one of the city's live venues. On May 7, 2020, mayor Steve Adler proclaimed the date as Black Pumas Day.

On November 24, 2020, "Colors" received Grammy Award nominations for Record of the Year and Best American Roots Performance, while their self-titled album received a nomination for Album of the Year, at the 63rd Annual Grammy Awards.

In January 2021, then President-elect Joe Biden invited the Black Pumas to perform during his Celebrating America primetime special during the President's Inauguration activities. Due to the COVID-19 pandemic, the band performed virtually.

In September 2021, Black Pumas were awarded Duo/Group of the Year at the 20th Annual Americana Honors & Awards. On November 23, 2021, Black Pumas received two Grammy Award nominations at the 64th Annual Grammy Awards. They were nominated twice in the Rock category. That brought their total Grammy nominations up to six. Their "Know You Better (Live From Capitol Studio A)" performance was nominated for Best Rock Performance, and their album Capitol Cuts (Live from Studio A) was nominated for Best Rock Album.

== Members ==
- Eric Burton – vocals, guitar
- Adrian Quesada – guitar

=== Backing band ===
- Angela Miller – backup vocals, tambourine
- Lauren Cervantes – backup vocals
- JaRon Marshall – keyboards
- Brendan Bond – bass
- Stephen Bidwell – drums

== Discography ==
=== Albums ===
==== Studio albums ====
Title	Details	Peak chart positions										Certifications
Title	Details	US	BEL (FL)	BEL (WA)	FRA	GER	NLD	SCO	SPA	SWI	UK Sales	Certifications
Black Pumas	Released: June 21, 2019; Label: ATO	86	57	79	112	51	46	45	81	58	45	RIAA: Gold; SNEP: Gold
Chronicles of a Diamond	Released: October 27, 2023; Label: ATO	69	15	19	21	16	20	18	79	19	22	

==== Live albums ====
Title	Details	Peak chart positions		
Title	Details	US Sales	SCO	UK Indie
Capitol Cuts (Live from Studio A)	Released: June 4, 2021; Label: ATO	86	62	49

=== Singles ===
Title	Year	Peak chart positions										Certifications	Album
Title	Year	US Dig.	US AAA	US Adult	US Rock	BEL (FL) Tip	CAN Dig.	CAN Rock	ICE	NLD Air	UK Down.	Certifications	Album
"Black Moon Rising"	2018	—	31	—	—	—	—	—	—	—	—		Black Pumas
"Colors"	2019	12	1	37	21	46	25	10	—	43	99	RIAA: Platinum; BPI: Gold; MC: 2× Platinum	Black Pumas
"OCT 33"	2020	—	—	—	—	— (Note: "OCT 33" did not enter the Flanders Ultratop Top 50, but charted as an extra tip on the Flanders Ultratop Bubbling Under chart.)	—	—	—	—	—		Black Pumas
"Fire"	2020	—	3	—	— (Note: "Fire" did not enter the Rock Songs chart, but peaked at number 40 on the Rock & Alternative Airplay chart.)	— (Note: "Fire" did not enter the Flanders Ultratop Top 50, but charted as an extra tip on the Flanders Ultratop Bubbling Under chart.)	—	20	—	—	—		Black Pumas
"I'm Ready"	2020	—	34	—	—	—	—	—	32	—	—		Black Pumas (Deluxe)
"Christmas Will Really Be Christmas"	2020	—	—	—	—	—	—	—	—	—	—		Non-album singles
"Strangers" (featuring Lucius)	2021	—	—	—	—	—	—	—	—	—	—		Non-album singles
"More Than a Love Song"	2023	—	1	—	— (Note: "More Than a Love Song" did not enter the Rock Songs chart, but peaked at number 22 on the Rock & Alternative Airplay chart.)	—	—	10	—	—	—		Chronicles of a Diamond
"Mrs. Postman"	2023	—	27	—	—	—	—	—	—	—	—		Chronicles of a Diamond
"Ice Cream (Pay Phone)"	2023	—	4	—	— (Note: "Ice Cream (Pay Phone)" did not enter the Rock Songs chart, but peaked at number 30 on the Rock & Alternative Airplay chart.)	—	—	—	—	—	—		Chronicles of a Diamond
"—" denotes a recording that did not chart or was not released in that territory.

== Awards and nominations ==
Organization	Year	Category	Nominated work	Result	Ref.
Grammy Award	2020	Best New Artist	Black Pumas	Nominated	
Grammy Award	2021	Record of the Year	"Colors"	Nominated	
Grammy Award	2021	American Roots Performance	"Colors"	Nominated	
Grammy Award	2021	Album of the Year	Black Pumas (Deluxe Edition)	Nominated	
Grammy Award	2022	Best Rock Performance	"Know You Better (Live from Capitol Studio A)"	Nominated	
Grammy Award	2022	Best Rock Album	Capitol Cuts - Live from Studio A	Nominated	
Grammy Award	2024	Best Rock Performance	"More Than a Love Song"	Nominated	
