= Chronicles of a Diamond =

Studio album by Black Pumas
- Released: October 27, 2023
- Length: 42:53
- Label: ATO
- Producer: Adrian Quesada

Black Pumas chronology
Black Pumas (2019)	Chronicles of a Diamond (2023)

Singles from Chronicles of a Diamond
- 1. "More Than a Love Song" Released: August 22, 2023

Chronicles of a Diamond is the second studio album by American band Black Pumas, released on October 27, 2023, through ATO Records. It was produced by group member Adrian Quesada, co-produced by fellow member Eric Burton and John Congleton, and mixed by Shawn Everett. The album was preceded by the lead single "More Than a Love Song".

== Background ==
On August 24, 2023, Black Pumas announced the release of Chronicles of a Diamond, along with the first single More Than a Love Song.

Eric Burton acknowledged that while the band were "under pressure" with their second album, it was still "a fun process and very cathartic as well" and "feels more like a second debut". With Chronicles of a Diamond, Burton stated that he "had a lot more to do with the creation of the music outside of lyrics and melody" than the band's debut.

=== Singles ===
The first single from the album, More Than a Love Song, featured at number 1 on Billboard's Adult Alternative Airplay. Consequence of Sound described the single as a song "built on a jangly groove and fleshed out with some orchestral strings, bold electric guitar riffs, and a gospel choir."

== Critical reception ==
Professional ratings
Aggregate scores
Source	Rating
Metacritic	76/100
Review scores
Source	Rating
Clash	7/10
Dork	4/5 stars
Exclaim!	7/10
Far Out	4.5/5 stars
Mojo	4/5 stars
NME	4/5 stars
The Observer	5/5 stars
Uncut	6/10

Chronicles of a Diamond received a score of 76 out of 100 on review aggregator Metacritic based on ten critics' reviews, indicating "generally favorable" reception. Mojo commented that "the production ideas and songs, however smart, won't change the world; they will, however, prompt large swathes to sing along". Clash's Emma Harrison called it a "cross-cultural heavenly palette of starry-eyed soul, psychedelic rock, jazz funk and symphonic pop" as well as "the most expansive expression yet of Black Pumas' frenetic creativity and limitless vision to date".

Thomas Smith of NME described it as "a more realised offering to the world and exceeds their debut album" and observed that "you can't help but hear Burton's confidence growing across the album's running time, his potential still untapped and with room to grow". Uncut felt that "while the material is frequently just serviceable, the arrangements are inspired thanks to the virtuosic interplay of JaRon Marshall's gilded piano, Brendan Bond's percolating basslines and Quesada's sizzling solos". Glide Magazine's Ryan Dillon opined that it is "bursting with colorful experimentation and pure musicianship that showcases a diversity that wasn't present on their debut".

== Track listing ==
All tracks are written by Eric Burton, except where noted.

Chronicles of a Diamond track listing
No.	Title	Length
1.	"More Than a Love Song" (Burton, Adrian Quesada)	4:47
2.	"Ice Cream (Pay Phone)"	3:52
3.	"Mrs. Postman" (Burton, Quesada, JaRon Marshall)	4:08
4.	"Chronicles of a Diamond"	3:29
5.	"Angel"	5:05
6.	"Hello"	3:57
7.	"Sauvignon" (Burton, Quesada)	3:19
8.	"Tomorrow"	4:51
9.	"Gemini Sun"	4:23
10.	"Rock and Roll"	4:52
Total length:		42:53

== Personnel ==
Black Pumas

- Eric Burton – vocals, co-production
- Adrian Quesada – production (all tracks), mixing (1), engineering (1, 3, 5), additional engineering (4, 6)

Additional Personnel

- Stephen Bidwell – drums, samples
- AJ Hall - drums, backing vocals (3, 6)
- Adam Jackson – drums (2)
- Brendan Bond – bass guitar
- Josh Blue - bass, keyboards, (2)
- Alexis Buffum – violin
- Lauren Cervantes – backing vocals
- JaRon Marshall - keyboards
- Anthony Farrell- keyboards, drums (8)
- Angela Miller – backing vocals
- Roy Patten - backing vocals (1)
- John Speice - congas, percussion
- Erik Wofford- mellotron (4)

Technical

- John Congleton – co-production, additional engineering (1, 4, 6, 9, 10)
- Chris Allgood – mastering
- Emily Lazar – mastering
- Aaron Glemboski – mixing (1), engineering (1, 3, 6, 7), additional engineering (2, 4, 5, 8, 9)
- Shawn Everett – mixing (2–10)
- Sean Cook – engineering (1, 4, 9, 10)
- Erik Wofford – engineering (2)
- Omar Akrouche – engineering (4)
- Jan Schenk – engineering (5, 9, 10)
- Mario Ramirez – engineering (8)
- Josh Blue – additional engineering (2, 5)
- AJ Hall – additional engineering (3, 5)
- Ian Gold – mixing assistance (2–10)

== Charts ==
Chart performance for Chronicles of a Diamond
Chart (2023)	Peak position
Austrian Albums (Ö3 Austria)	21
Belgian Albums (Ultratop Flanders)	15
Belgian Albums (Ultratop Wallonia)	19
Dutch Albums (Album Top 100)	20
French Albums (SNEP)	21
German Albums (Offizielle Top 100)	16
Hungarian Physical Albums (MAHASZ)	19
Scottish Albums (OCC)	18
Spanish Albums (PROMUSICAE)	79
Swiss Albums (Schweizer Hitparade)	19
UK Americana Albums (OCC)	4
UK Album Downloads (OCC)	24
UK Independent Albums (OCC)	10
UK R&B Albums (OCC)	2
US Billboard 200	69
US Americana/Folk Albums (Billboard)	4
US Independent Albums (Billboard)	14
US Top R&B/Hip-Hop Albums (Billboard)	7
US Top Rock Albums (Billboard)	14
