= Jon Kaplan (music producer) =

American record producer

Jon Kaplan is an American Grammy Award winning mixer and record producer with credits on albums totaling over 25 million in sales and nearly 2 billion streams.

He began his career as the bassist for The Hatters (1992–1995), a New York-based jam band signed to Atlantic Records. Upon the dissolution of The Hatters, Kaplan began work as an audio engineer, mixer, and producer.

His credits include Sara Bareilles, Gavin DeGraw, Parachute, Ingrid Michaelson, Jimmy Fallon, Upsahl, J. Lo and Arcane with Grammy nominations for his work with the reggae band, SOJA, psychedelic soul band Black Pumas and Contemporary Christian artist Crowder. Kaplan mixed the Zach Williams album, Chainbreaker, which won the 2018 Grammy for Contemporary Christian Album of The Year.
