= Colors (Black Pumas song) =

2019 single by Black Pumas

Single by Black Pumas

from the album Black Pumas
- Released: April 16, 2019
- Genre: Blues; psychedelic soul; funk
- Length: 4:06
- Label: ATO
- Songwriter: Eric Burton
- Producer: Adrian Quesada

Black Pumas singles chronology
"Black Moon Rising" (2018)	"Colors" (2019)	"Oct 33" (2020)

Music video
- "Colors" on YouTube

"Colors" is a song by American psychedelic soul band Black Pumas. It was released on April 16, 2019, as the third single from the band's debut studio album Black Pumas. The song was written by singer-songwriter Eric Burton, and produced by guitarist/producer Adrian Quesada. It was nominated for Record of the Year and Best American Roots Performance at the 2021 Grammy Awards.

== Background ==
The inspiration of the song was the "multicolored tones of the sky", with the song portraying "themes of mortality and togetherness". In an interview, Burton stated: "This was something that I had written just learning how to play guitar. I had woke up from a nap on my uncle's rooftop in Alamagordo, New Mexico, I was just playing note after note, whatever sounded good. [...] When I was writing this song, I was actually leading worship at a church, and I was trying to figure out, 'How do I write a song that explains the plight of someone who is spiritual trying to find their truth?' That's also the reason for the backup gospel singers you might hear in the chorus, who help round out that uplifting, church-like sound."

== Music video ==
An accompanying music video was released on November 22, 2019, and directed by Kristian Mercado. In an interview, he stated: "I really wanted to capture how powerful the sounds and vocals of Black Pumas are, I'm driven by emotion and felt a strong connection to the music. [...] It was such a powerful song and experience that I sought out to do the music video for the song. We shot the whole film in the Bronx, wanted to show the Bronx as a place that was alive and vibrant. We wanted to celebrate family, connections, movement, and life."

== Charts ==
=== Weekly charts ===
Weekly chart performance for "Colors"
Chart (2019–2021)	Peak position
Belgium (Ultratip Bubbling Under Flanders)	46
Canada Rock (Billboard)	10
UK Singles Downloads (Official Charts)	99
US Adult Pop Airplay (Billboard)	37
US Hot Rock & Alternative Songs (Billboard)	21
US Rock & Alternative Airplay (Billboard)	13

=== Year-end charts ===
Year-end chart performance for "Colors"
Chart (2021)	Position
US Hot Rock & Alternative Songs (Billboard)	88

== Certifications ==
Certifications for "Colors"
Region	Certification	Certified units/sales
Canada (Music Canada)	2× Platinum	160,000^{‡}
France (SNEP)	Diamond	333,333^{‡}
New Zealand (RMNZ)	Platinum	30,000^{‡}
Spain (Promusicae)	Gold	30,000^{‡}
United Kingdom (BPI)	Gold	400,000^{‡}
United States (RIAA)	Platinum	1,000,000^{‡}
^{‡} Sales+streaming figures based on certification alone.

== Release history ==
Release history for "Colors"
Region	Date	Format	Label	Ref.
Various	April 16, 2019	Digital download; streaming	ATO	
United States	June 15, 2020	Adult contemporary radio	ATO	
United States	February 9, 2021	Alternative radio	ATO	
