= El Existential =

Studio album by Grupo Fantasma
- Released: June 15, 2010
- Genre: Latin alternative, cumbia, Latin jazz, funk rock, psychedelic rock
- Length: 48:28
- Label: Nat Geo Music

El Existential is a studio album by the American band Grupo Fantasma, released in 2010 through the record label Nat Geo Music. In 2011, the album earned the band the Grammy Award for Best Latin Rock, Alternative or Urban Album.
