= Adrian Quesada =

American musician

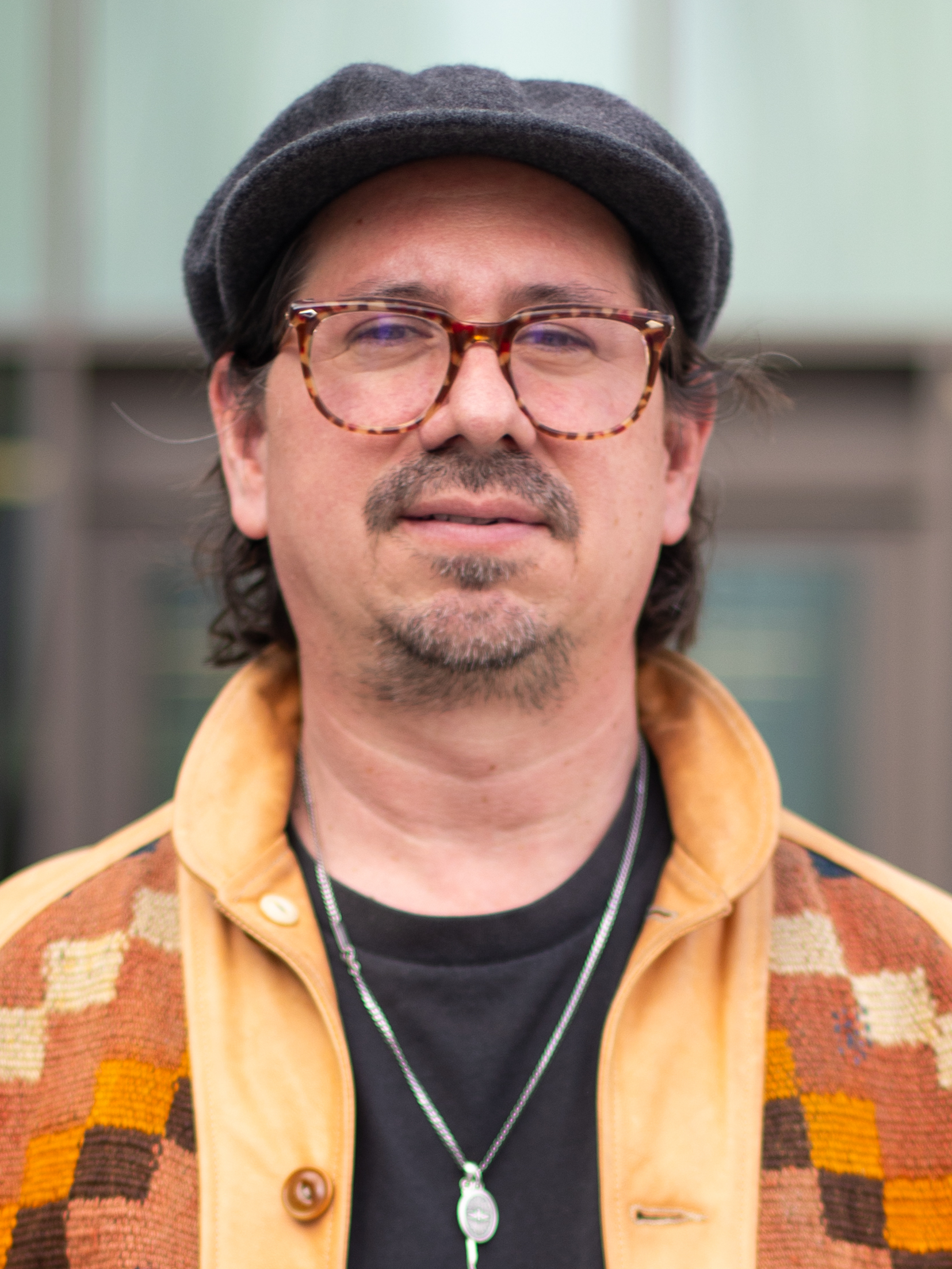
- Quesada in 2025

Background information
- Born: Laredo, Texas, U.S.
- Genre: Rock, Latin funk, psychedelic soul, roots
- Occupations: Multi-instrumentalist; songwriter; record producer
- Years active: 2000–present
- Labels: ATO; Innova; ESL Music; Nacional Records
- Member of: Black Pumas; Grupo Fantasma
- Formerly of: Brownout; Ocote Soul Sounds; Echocentrics; Spanish Gold

Adrian Quesada is an American musician, producer, and songwriter. He is best known for his work with Black Pumas. Quesada is an eight-time Grammy nominee and won Best Latin Rock or Alternative Album as a member of Grupo Fantasma in 2011. In 2024 he co-wrote and sang “Like A Bird” from the film Sing Sing receiving an Academy Awards nomination for Best Original Song.

== Early life and education ==
Quesada grew up on the US-Mexico border in Laredo, Texas, in the 1990s. As a child, he listened to punk and hip-hop as well as the Tex-Mex music he heard on both sides of the border. In a 2021 interview he said that although he soaked in the Latin music he was surrounded by, he did not fully appreciate it until he was in college.

Quesada started to play guitar when he was 13. He attended the University of Texas in Austin, due, in part, to the city's active music scene.

== Career ==
In Austin, Quesada played in bands including Brownout, Ocote Soul Sound, Spanish Gold, Echocentrics, and Grupo Fantasma, with whom he played for 15 years. The Austin American Statesman described him as the "creative force behind four highly successful bands" who had become a "central figure in putting Austin on the contemporary Latin music map."

In late 2017, on the recommendation of a friend, Quesada contacted Eric Burton to sing on instrumentals he had recorded. They formed Black Pumas shortly after their first meeting, and released their self-titled debut in June 2019. Critically acclaimed, they were nominated for the Best New Artist Grammy four months after their first album was released. A deluxe version of their debut and a live album were subsequently released; as of 2022 the Black Pumas had received six Grammy nominations, including Album of the Year and Song of the Year. They played more than 60 live shows prior to and after the COVID-19 pandemic and, in addition to other television shows, they appeared on Austin City Limits, the Grammy Awards telecast, Late Show with Stephen Colbert and Celebrating America, the concert following the Biden inauguration.

In early 2022, inspired by the Latin American psychedelic ballads of the sixties and seventies, Quesada recorded Boleros Psicodélicos. Set for release in June, iLe, Gabriel Garzón-Montano, Girl Ultra and Marc Ribot are featured on the record, which includes classic balada music as well as Quesada's original compositions. Rolling Stone's Ernesto Lechner wrote that with its "remarkable intensity and a mind-boggling attention to detail", the album "promised to be one of 2022's most gorgeous releases". The first single from the album, "Mentiras con Cariño" (featuring iLe), was released in March 2022. It was Quesada's first solo single.

Well-known as a producer, Quesada works out of his Austin studio, Electric Deluxe. In addition the Black Pumas records, he has more than 150 production credits, including Look at My Soul: The Latin Shade of Texas Soul, his collection of original songs and re-recordings of Chicano soul classics.

== Selected discography ==
Year	Album, extended play collaboration	Artist	Label
2025	Boleros Psicodélicos II	Adrian Quesada	ATO Records
2022	Boleros Psicodélicos	Adrian Quesada	ATO Records
2022	Jaguar Sound	Adrian Quesada	
2021	Capitol Cuts: Live from Studio A	Black Pumas	ATO Records
2019	Black Pumas	Black Pumas	ATO Records
2018	Look at My Soul: The Latin Shade of Texas Soul	Quesada, various artists	Nacional Records
2012	Adrian Younge vs. Adrian Quesada	Adrian Younge and Adrian Quesada	Ubiquity
2011	Sunshadows	The Echocentrics	Ubiquity
2011	Duke! Three Portraits Of Ellington	Golden Arm Trio, Adrian Quesada, Graham Reynolds, Duke Ellington	Innova
2009	Coconut Rock	Martin Perna and Adrian Quesada	ESL Music / Eighteenth Street
2008	Sonidas Gold	Grupo Fantasma	Aire Sole Records
2004	El Niño y el Sol	Ocote Soul Sounds/Adrian Quesada	ESL Music

== Awards and nominations ==
Association	Year	Category	Nominated work	Result	Ref.
Academy Awards	2025	Best Original Song	"Like a Bird" from Sing Sing	Nominated	
Black Reel Awards	2025	Outstanding Original Song	"Like a Bird" from Sing Sing	Nominated	
Houston Film Critics Society Awards	2024	Best Original Song	"Like a Bird" from Sing Sing	Nominated	
Grammy Awards	2022	Capitol Cuts: Live from Studio A (Black Pumas)	Best Rock Album	Nominated	
Grammy Awards	2022	Capitol Cuts: Live from Studio A (Black Pumas)	Best Rock Performance	Nominated	
Grammy Awards	2021	"Colors"	Record of the Year	Nominated	
Grammy Awards	2021	Black Pumas (Deluxe Edition)	Album of the Year	Nominated	
Grammy Awards	2021	Black Pumas (Deluxe Edition)	Best American Roots Performance	Nominated	
Grammy Awards	2020	Black Pumas	Best New Artist	Nominated	
Grammy Awards	2011	El Existential, Grupo Fantasma	Best Latin Rock or Alternative Album	Won	
Grammy Awards	2009	Sonidas Gold, Grupo Fantasma	Best Latin Rock or Alternative Album	Nominated	
