= Grupo Fantasma =

American Latin funk orchestra

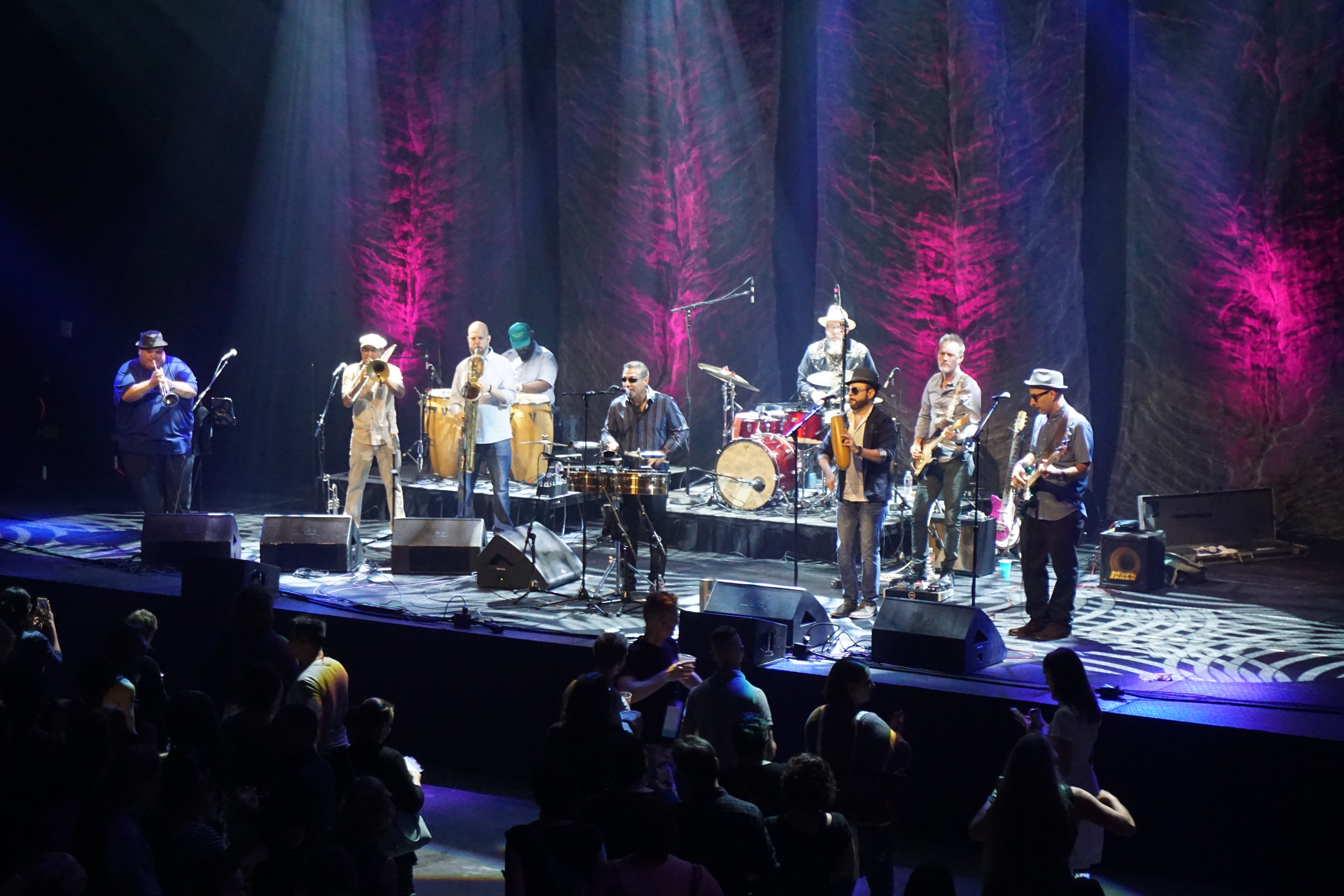
- Grupo Fantasma performing at Austin City Limits Live at the Moody Theater

Background information
- Origin: 2000
- Website: www.grupofantasma.com

Grupo Fantasma is a nine-piece Latin funk orchestra from Austin, Texas.

== Biography ==
Formed in 2000 from the merger of two Austin acts, The Blimp and The Blue Noise Band, the band emerged with a biweekly gig at the Empanada Parlour in Austin in 2001. The band is best known for their exuberant live shows, innovative contemporary recordings and associations with Prince and his 3121 Club in Las Vegas. The band backed Prince on numerous occasions, including his performance on the ALMA Awards in 2007, and often performed at his after-party jam sessions. The band has performed with a diverse array of artists including Maceo Parker, Sheila E, GZA of Wu-Tang Clan, Spoon, Daniel Johnston, and many others. The ensemble has sold more than 20,000 albums independently and has had music featured in many popular television series.

Grupo Fantasma twice played the Austin City Limits Music Festival and taped an episode of the Austin City Limits television series on PBS, which first aired November 17, 2007. They have also performed at such festivals as the Montreal Jazz Festival, Bonnaroo, Wakarusa, WOMAD, North Sea Jazz Festival and the Calgary Folk Music Festival as well as having headlined numerous SXSW showcases in their career. The band performs frequently, regularly doing over 150 performances a year. Their horn section has also made various appearances on worldwide releases and has performed with indie rock band Spoon. Grupo Fantasma's music has been featured in the NYC public-access television cable TV show The Unbelievable Show from 2001 to 2004. The band has garnered over a dozen Austin Music Awards, and an induction into the Austin Music Hall of Fame.

The group's album Sonidos Gold was nominated for Best Latin Rock or Alternative Album for the 51st Grammy Awards. Grupo's album El Existential was awarded the Grammy for Best Latin Rock or Alternative Album at the 53rd Grammy Awards two years later.

On March 29, 2019, Grupo Fantasma released their seventh full-length album, American Music Vol. VII, on Blue Corn Music. The album, with its unique multi-ethnic sound, takes on the intricacies of identity. Even the title itself examines issues of identity and the concept of the "other". In a review, NPR described American Music Vol. VII as "a perfectly executed bi-cultural statement, made for the millions of folks who love mariachi as much as James Brown".

Grupo Fantasma’s songs “Chocolate”, “Barretta” and “Perso Fra/Mesquites” were featured in Showtime’s Weeds season 6 premiere episode, which debuted on August 16, 2010, and their cover of the Chicago song "Saturday in the Park" (Sabado en el Parque) was featured on the TV show Breaking Bad.

== Discography ==
- Grupo Fantasma (2002)
- Movimiento Popular (2004)
- Comes Alive (2006)
- Sonidos Gold (2008)
- El Existential (2010)
- Problemas (2016)
- American Music: Volume 7 (2019)

The band has also been featured on various other albums:

- Mascaras by Sergent Garcia (2004 EMI France/Virgin Records)
- Uno, Dos, Banderas by Control Machete (2004 Universal)
- Eklektikos Live (2005) – "Cansado"
- Homenaje by Brownout (2007, Freestyle Records)
- Aguilas and Cobras by Brownout (2009, Six Degrees Records)
- Oozy by Brownout (2012, NatGeo Records)

== Band ==
=== Current members ===
- Beto Martinez – Guitar
- John Speice – Drums
- Jose Galeano – Percussion, vocals
- Greg Gonzalez – Bass
- Mark Gonzales – Trombone
- Josh Levy – Baritone saxophone
- Gilbert Elorreaga – Trumpet
- Kino Esparza – Vocals, percussion
- Matthew Holmes – Congas

=== Former members ===
- Johnny Lopez III – drums
- David Lobel – baritone saxophone
- Jeremy Bruch - percussion
- Brian Ramos - vocals
- Joseph Serrato - saxophone
- Dave Wolfe - trumpet
- Gene Centeno - saxophone
- Leo Gauna - trombone
- Adrian Quesada - guitar
