= Grammy Award for Record of the Year =

Annual award for song recordings

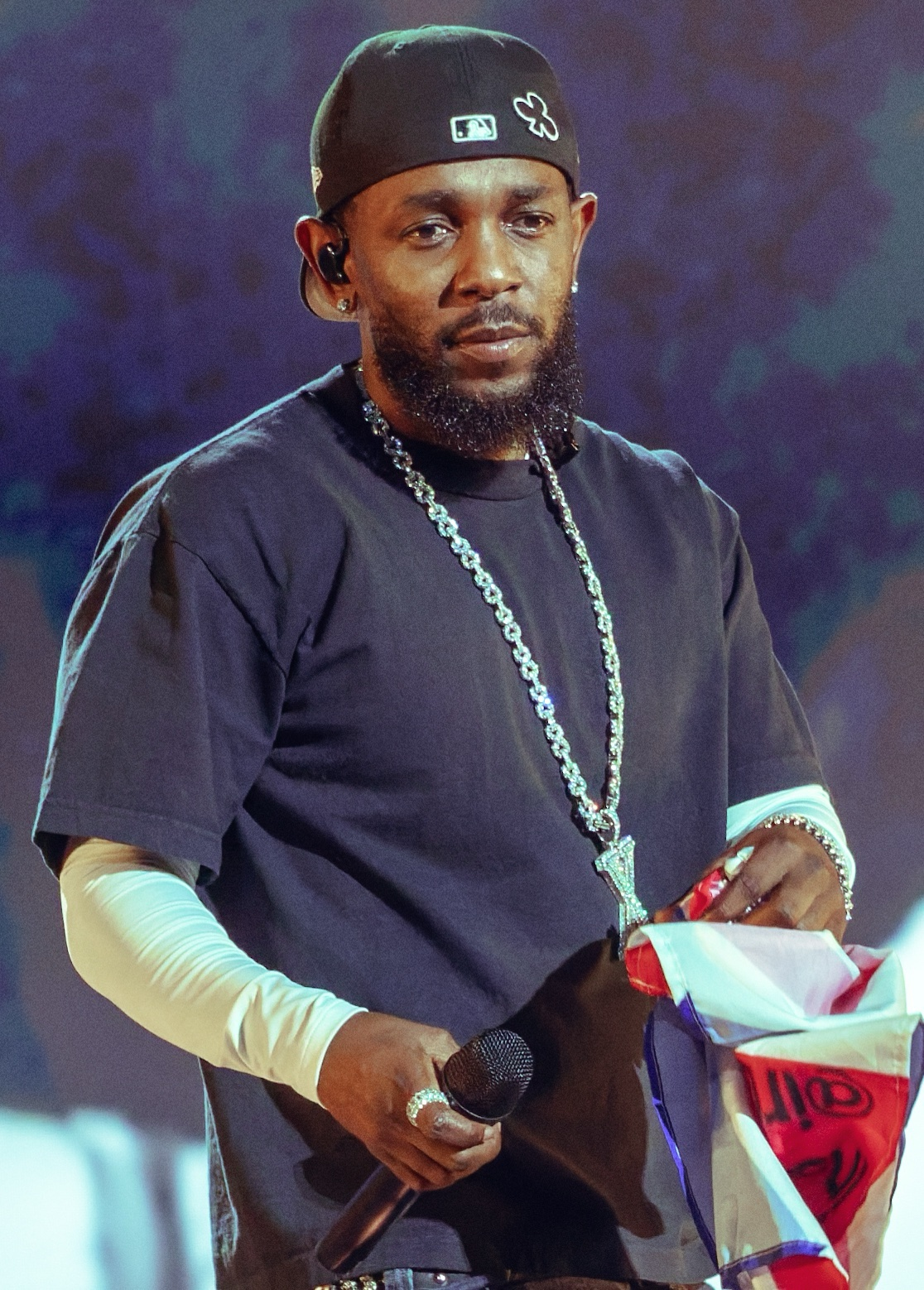
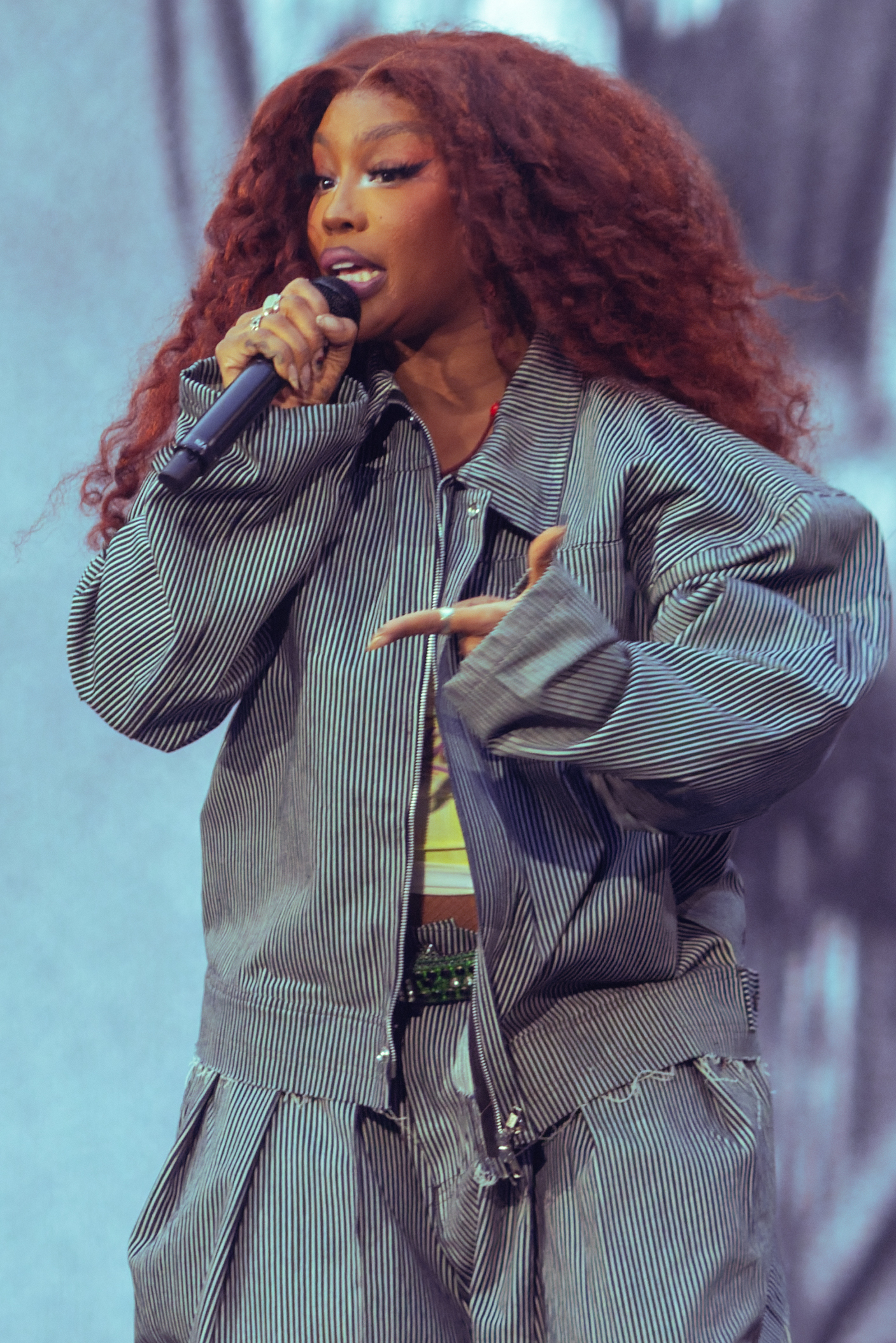
- "Luther", by Kendrick Lamar (left) and SZA (right), is the most recent recipient.
- Awarded for: Quality vocal or instrumental recording tracks
- Country: United States
- Presented by: National Academy of Recording Arts and Sciences
- First award: 1959
- Currently held by: Kendrick Lamar – "Luther" (2026)

Highlights
- Most wins: Tom Coyne (4)
- Most nominations: Beyoncé (9)
- Website: grammy.com/awards/categories/record-of-the-year

The Grammy Award for Record of the Year is presented by the National Academy of Recording Arts and Sciences of the United States to "honor artistic achievement, technical proficiency and overall excellence in the recording industry, without regard to sales or chart position." The Record of the Year award is one of the "General Field" categories at the awards presented annually since the 1st Annual Grammy Awards in 1959 (alongside Best New Artist, Song of the Year and Album of the Year).

For commercially released singles or tracks of new vocal or instrumental recordings. Tracks from a previous year's album may be entered provided the track was not entered the previous year and provided the album did not win a Grammy Award to the artist(s), producer(s), recording engineer(s) and/or mixer(s) if other than the artist.

Arrangers, songwriters, musicians and background singers of a winning recording can apply for a Winners Certificate. Songwriters can only apply for a certificate if it is a new song.

Since the 55th Annual Grammy Awards in 2013, mastering engineers are considered nominees and award recipients in this category.

Although "record" often refers to any recording of music, Record of the Year differs from Song of the Year or Album of the Year:

- Record of the Year is awarded for a single or for one track from an album. This award goes to the performing artist, the producer, recording engineer and/or mixer for that song. In this sense, "record" means a particular recorded song, not its composition or an album of songs.
- Song of the Year is also awarded for a single or individual track, but the recipient of this award is the songwriter who actually wrote the lyrics and/or melodies to the song. "Song" in this context means the song as composed, not its recording.
- Album of the Year is awarded for a whole album, and the award is presented to the artist, songwriter, producer, recording engineer, and mastering engineer for that album. In this context, "album" means a recorded collection of songs (a multi-track LP, CD, or download package), not the individual songs or their compositions.

== History and description ==
The Record of the Year awards have been awarded since 1959. It is one of the four most prestigious Grammy Awards. Despite both the Song of the Year award and Record of the Year being awarded for a single or for one track from an album, this award goes to the performer and production team of the song whereas the Song of the Year award goes only to the composer(s) of the song. According to the 54th Grammy Awards description guide, the award is given for commercially released singles or tracks of new vocal or instrumental recordings. Tracks from a previous year's album may be entered provided the track was not entered the previous year and provided the album did not win a Grammy Award to the artist(s), producer(s), recording engineer(s) and/or mixer(s) if other than the artist. Associate producers and executive producers are not eligible".

The honorees through its history have been:

- 1959–1965: Artist only.
- 1966–1998: Artist and producer.
- 1999–2012: Artist, producer, recording engineer and mixing engineer
- 2013–present: Artist, producer, recording engineer, mixing engineer and mastering engineer

The category has expanded to include eight nominees in 2019.

== Achievements ==
=== Most wins ===
Tom Coyne holds the record for most wins in this category as a mastering engineer at four times (2015, 2016, 2017 and 2018) and was the only person to win the award four consecutive years. Only two artists have won three times: Paul Simon ("Mrs. Robinson" in 1969, "Bridge over Troubled Water" in 1971, both as part of Simon & Garfunkel; and "Graceland" in 1988) and Bruno Mars ("Uptown Funk" in 2016, with Mark Ronson; "24K Magic" in 2018; and "Leave the Door Open" in 2022, as part of Silk Sonic). Four engineers/mixers have won the award three times, Tom Elmhirst has won three times as an engineer/mixer (2008, 2012 and 2017), Serban Ghenea (2016, 2018 and 2022), John Hanes (2016, 2018 and 2022), and Charles Moniz (2016, 2018 and 2022)

Roberta Flack was the first artist to win Record of the Year in two consecutive years: in 1973 ("The First Time Ever I Saw Your Face") and 1974 ("Killing Me Softly with His Song") from two different studio albums. This happened again when U2 won in 2001 ("Beautiful Day") and 2002 ("Walk On"), the only occurrence of an artist winning the award in two consecutive years with records from the same album. Billie Eilish became the first musician ever to complete the feat with recordings from a studio album, as well as a non-album single: in 2020 ("Bad Guy") and 2021 ("Everything I Wanted"). Kendrick Lamar achieved the feat with his 2025 win for ("Not Like Us") and 2026 ("Luther").

Other artists to receive multiple Grammys for Record of the Year are Henry Mancini ("Moon River" and "Days of Wine and Roses"); Simon & Garfunkel ("Mrs. Robinson" and "Bridge over Troubled Water"); The 5th Dimension ("Up, Up and Away" and "Aquarius/Let the Sunshine In"); Eric Clapton ("Tears in Heaven" and "Change the World"); Norah Jones ("Don't Know Why" and "Here We Go Again"); Adele ("Rolling in the Deep" and "Hello").

Mark Ronson is the only performer to win the award both as the main credit artist and as a record producer, winning as lead artist for his respective song, "Uptown Funk" (featuring Bruno Mars); and as a producer for "Rehab" by Amy Winehouse.

The instrumentalist to appear on the most consecutive Records of the Year is Hal Blaine, the prolific studio drummer who played on six consecutive winners from 1966 to 1971: "A Taste of Honey", "Strangers in the Night", "Up, Up and Away", "Mrs. Robinson", "Aquarius/Let the Sunshine In", and "Bridge Over Troubled Water".

=== Most nominations ===
Beyoncé and Bruno Mars are the most nominated artist for Record of the Year with nine nominations each. Beyoncé also has the most Record of the Year nominations among female artists with nods for "Say My Name" as part of Destiny's Child and eight times as a solo act with "Crazy in Love" (featuring Jay-Z), "Irreplaceable", "Halo", "Formation", "Black Parade", "Savage" (with Megan Thee Stallion), "Break My Soul" and "Texas Hold 'Em"; however, she is yet to win one. Mars is the most nominated male artist with nine nominations for "Nothin' on You" as a featured artist, CeeLo Green's "Fuck You" as a producer, "Grenade", "Locked Out of Heaven", "Uptown Funk" as a featured artist with Mark Ronson, "24K Magic", "Leave the Door Open" as part of Silk Sonic, "APT." (with Rosé) and "I Just Might". The Beatles have the most Record of the Year nominations as a group, with five nominations: "I Want to Hold Your Hand", "Yesterday", "Hey Jude", "Let It Be" and "Now and Then"; but never won the award.

Frank Sinatra holds the record for most consecutive years being nominated for Record of the Year, with four. Additionally, Roberta Flack, Steve Winwood, Post Malone, Billie Eilish, and Doja Cat are the only artists to receive three consecutive nominations for Record of the Year.

=== African-American winners and nominees ===
Roberta Flack, George Benson, Michael Jackson, Tina Turner, Bobby McFerrin, Natalie Cole, Nat King Cole, Whitney Houston, Seal, Ray Charles, Pharrell Williams, Nile Rodgers, Childish Gambino, Anderson .Paak, Lizzo, Kendrick Lamar and SZA are the only African-Americans to win the award, with Flack and Lamar winning twice consecutively.

Mariah Carey, who is in part of African-American heritage though her African-American and African-Venezuelan father, has been nominated three times, with "Vision of Love" in 1991, "One Sweet Day" in 1996, and "We Belong Together" in 2006.

=== Latino and Hispanic winners and nominees ===
In 1965, Astrud Gilberto became the first Brazilian and Latino to win the award for "The Girl from Ipanema". In 1984, Puerto Rican-Cuban Irene Cara became the first Hispanic and second Latino to be nominated for "Flashdance... What a Feeling". She was followed by the Mexican-American rock band Los Lobos, who earned a nomination for "La Bamba" in 1988. It was the first time a Spanish-language song was nominated in the category. Santana, the rock band led by Mexican Carlos Santana, came next, becoming the first Hispanic and second Latino act to win the category in 2000. Puerto Rican singer Ricky Martin was also nominated for "Livin' la Vida Loca" in 2000.

He was followed by fellow Puerto Rican singers Luis Fonsi and Daddy Yankee in 2018. Jointly nominated for "Despacito", they became the second artists to earn a nomination for a Spanish-language song in the category. In 2019, Puerto Rican rapper Bad Bunny, Dominican-Trinidadian rapper Cardi B, and Colombian singer J Balvin were jointly nominated for "I Like It". In 2021, the psychedelic soul band Black Pumas, led in part by Mexican-American Adrian Quesada, received a nomination for "Colors". In 2026, Bad Bunny followed, earning a second nomination for "DTMF". He became the first full Hispanic and Latino to be nominated twice and the third to be nominated for a primarily Spanish-language song in the categor

Bruno Mars, who is in part of Hispanic and Latino heritage though his Puerto Rican-Ashkenazi Jewish father, has won the category three times, with "Uptown Funk" in 2016, "24K Magic" in 2018, and "Leave the Door Open" in 2022. He also has been nominated six times, with "Nothin on You" and "Fuck You" (as producer) in 2011, "Grenade" 2012, "Locked Out of Heaven" in 2014, "APT." in 2026 and "I Just Might" in 2027.

=== Female winners ===
The first woman to win the award was Astrud Gilberto in 1965, for "The Girl from Ipanema" (with Stan Getz). Roberta Flack was the first female artist to win the award twice. Flack, Norah Jones, Adele, and Billie Eilish are the only women to win the award more than once for their recordings, winning for "The First Time Ever I Saw Your Face" and "Killing Me Softly with His Song"; and "Don't Know Why" and "Here We Go Again" (with Ray Charles); and "Rolling in the Deep" and "Hello"; and "Bad Guy" and "Everything I Wanted", respectively (Flack was also nominated for "Feel Like Makin' Love"; Adele nominated for "Chasing Pavements" and "Easy on Me"; and Eilish nominated for "Happier Than Ever", "What Was I Made For?", "Birds of a Feather” and “Wildflower”). Additionally, both Florence LaRue and Marilyn McCoo also receive this accolade twice as part of The 5th Dimension, for "Up, Up and Away" and "Aquarius/Let the Sunshine In".

=== Rapper winners and nominees ===
In 1991, "U Can't Touch This" by MC Hammer was the first rap song to be nominated. Since then, 15 other rap songs were nominated, but twenty-eight years later, in 2019, "This is America" by Childish Gambino became the first rap song to win. In 2025 and 2026, "Not Like Us" by Kendrick Lamar and "Luther" by Kendrick Lamar and SZA would win both years, marking the first time that a rap song won in consecutive years, and making Lamar just the fourth artist to do so. In addition to being the only rapper to win twice and in consecutive years, Lamar is also the most nominated rapper with five nominations for "Humble" in 2018, "All the Stars" in 2019, "The Heart Part 5" in 2023, "Not Like Us" in 2025, and "Luther" in 2026. M.I.A. in 2009, Iggy Azalea in 2015, Cardi B in 2019, Doja Cat in 2021–2023, Megan Thee Stallion in 2021, and Doechii in 2026, are the only female rappers to be nominated for the award. Doja Cat is one of only six artists, of any genre, to receive three consecutive nominations, for "Say So", "Kiss Me More" and "Woman".

=== Youngest winners and nominees ===
At 17 years old, Lorde became the youngest main artist to be nominated for "Royals" in 2014, followed by Billie Eilish who was also 17, just shy of 18, nominated for "Bad Guy" in 2020. Eilish then became the youngest winner at 18 years old for "Bad Guy" in 2020, and then also the second-youngest winner (after herself) for "Everything I Wanted" in 2021, at 19 years old. Sam Smith is the youngest male winner, at 22 years old in 2015.

=== Winners of other categories ===
Christopher Cross and Billie Eilish are the only artists to receive Grammys for Record of the Year as well as Album of the Year, Song of the Year, and Best New Artist in a single ceremony. Adele was the first artist to win the awards for Record of the Year, Album of the Year, Song of the Year, and Best New Artist on separate occasions. Only seven artists took the Record of the Year and Best New Artist awards during the same ceremony: Bobby Darin ("Mack the Knife" in 1960), Christopher Cross ("Sailing" in 1981), Sheryl Crow ("All I Wanna Do" in 1995), Norah Jones ("Don't Know Why" in 2003), Amy Winehouse ("Rehab" in 2008), Sam Smith ("Stay with Me (Darkchild Version)" in 2015) and Billie Eilish ("Bad Guy" in 2020).

Thirty-two of the winning songs have also won the award for Song of the Year.

== Process ==
From 1995 to 2021, members of the National Academy of Recording Arts and Sciences nominated their choices for record of the year. A list of the top twenty records was given to the Nominations Review Committee, a specially selected group of anonymous members, who then selected the top five records to gain a nomination in the category in a special ballot. The rest of the members then voted on a winner from the five nominees. In 2018, it was announced the number of nominated tracks will be increased to eight. In 2021, it was announced that the Nomination Review Committees would be disbanded, and the final nominees for record of the year would be decided by votes from members. Starting in 2022, the number of nominees in the category increased to 10. However, the decision to expand the number of nominees in this category was made 24 hours before the nominees were announced after an early version of the nominations list had already been circulated. This allowed "Montero (Call Me by Your Name)" by Lil Nas X and "I Still Have Faith in You" by ABBA to be nominated as they were the records that received the most votes besides the other eight nominees. As of the 2024 ceremony, the number of nominees has been reduced back to eight.

== Recipients ==
=== 1950s ===
Year^{[I]}	Record	Artist(s)
1959 (May)	"Nel Blu Dipinto Di Blu (Volare)"	Domenico Modugno
1959 (May)	"Catch a Falling Star"	Perry Como
1959 (May)	"The Chipmunk Song (Christmas Don't Be Late)"	David Seville
1959 (May)	"Fever"	Peggy Lee
1959 (May)	"Witchcraft"	Frank Sinatra
1959 (November)	"Mack the Knife"	Bobby Darin
1959 (November)	"A Fool Such as I"	Elvis Presley
1959 (November)	"High Hopes"	Frank Sinatra
1959 (November)	"Like Young"	André Previn
1959 (November)	"The Three Bells"	The Browns

=== 1960s ===
Year^{[I]}	Record	Artist(s)	Production team
1961	"Theme from A Summer Place"	Percy Faith	
1961	"Are You Lonesome Tonight?"	Elvis Presley	
1961	"Georgia on My Mind"	Ray Charles	
1961	"Mack the Knife"	Ella Fitzgerald	
1961	"Nice 'n' Easy"	Frank Sinatra	
1962	"Moon River"	Henry Mancini	
1962	"Big Bad John"	Jimmy Dean	
1962	"The Second Time Around"	Frank Sinatra	
1962	"Take Five"	The Dave Brubeck Quartet	
1962	"(Up a) Lazy River"	Si Zentner	
1963	"I Left My Heart in San Francisco"	Tony Bennett	
1963	"Desafinado"	Stan Getz & Charlie Byrd	
1963	"Fly Me to the Moon Bossa Nova"	Joe Harnell and His Orchestra	
1963	"I Can't Stop Loving You"	Ray Charles	
1963	"What Kind of Fool Am I?"	Sammy Davis Jr.	
1964	"Days of Wine and Roses"	Henry Mancini	
1964	"Dominique"	The Singing Nun	
1964	"Happy Days Are Here Again"	Barbra Streisand	
1964	"I Wanna Be Around"	Tony Bennett	
1964	"Wives and Lovers"	Jack Jones	
1965	"The Girl from Ipanema"	Stan Getz & Astrud Gilberto	
1965	"Downtown"	Petula Clark	
1965	"Hello, Dolly!"	Louis Armstrong	
1965	"I Want to Hold Your Hand"	The Beatles	
1965	"People"	Barbra Streisand	
1966	"A Taste of Honey"	Herb Alpert & the Tijuana Brass	Herb Alpert & Jerry Moss, producers
1966	"The 'In' Crowd"	Ramsey Lewis Trio	Esmond Edwards, producer
1966	"King of the Road"	Roger Miller	Jerry Kennedy, producer
1966	"The Shadow of Your Smile (Love Theme From "The Sandpiper")"	Tony Bennett	Al Stanton & Ernie Altschuler, producers
1966	"Yesterday"	The Beatles	George Martin, producer
1967	"Strangers in the Night"	Frank Sinatra	Jimmy Bowen, producer
1967	"Almost Persuaded"	David Houston	Billy Sherrill, producer
1967	"Monday, Monday"	The Mamas and the Papas	Lou Adler, producer
1967	"What Now My Love"	Herb Alpert & the Tijuana Brass	Herb Alpert & Jerry Moss, producers
1967	"Winchester Cathedral"	The New Vaudeville Band	Geoff Stephens, producer
1968	"Up, Up and Away"	The 5th Dimension	Marc Gordon & Johnny Rivers, producers
1968	"By the Time I Get to Phoenix"	Glen Campbell	Al De Lory, producer
1968	"My Cup Runneth Over"	Ed Ames	Joe Reisman & Jim Foglesong, producers
1968	"Ode to Billie Joe"	Bobbie Gentry	Kelly Gordon & Bobby Paris, producers
1968	"Somethin' Stupid"	Frank Sinatra & Nancy Sinatra	Jimmy Bowen & Lee Hazlewood, producers
1969	"Mrs. Robinson"	Simon & Garfunkel	Roy Halee & Simon & Garfunkel, producers
1969	"Harper Valley PTA"	Jeannie C. Riley	Shelby Singleton, producer
1969	"Hey Jude"	The Beatles	George Martin, producer
1969	"Honey"	Bobby Goldsboro	Bob Montgomery & Bobby Goldsboro, producers
1969	"Wichita Lineman"	Glen Campbell	Al De Lory, producer

=== 1970s ===
Year^{[I]}	Record	Artist(s)	Production team
1970	"Aquarius/Let the Sunshine In"	The 5th Dimension	Bones Howe, producer
1970	"A Boy Named Sue"	Johnny Cash	Bob Johnston, producer
1970	"Is That All There Is?"	Peggy Lee	Jerry Leiber & Mike Stoller, producers
1970	"Love Theme from Romeo and Juliet"	Henry Mancini	Joe Reisman, producer
1970	"Spinning Wheel"	Blood, Sweat & Tears	James Guercio, producer
1971	"Bridge over Troubled Water"	Simon & Garfunkel	Roy Halee, Paul Simon & Art Garfunkel, producers
1971	"(They Long to Be) Close to You"	The Carpenters	Jack Daugherty, producer
1971	"Everything Is Beautiful"	Ray Stevens	Ray Stevens, producer
1971	"Fire and Rain"	James Taylor	Peter Asher, producer
1971	"Let It Be"	The Beatles	George Martin, producer
1972	"It's Too Late"	Carole King	Lou Adler, producer
1972	"Joy to the World"	Three Dog Night	Richard Podolor, producer
1972	"My Sweet Lord"	George Harrison	George Harrison & Phil Spector, producers
1972	"Theme from Shaft"	Isaac Hayes	Isaac Hayes, producer
1972	"You've Got a Friend"	James Taylor	Peter Asher, producer
1973	"The First Time Ever I Saw Your Face"	Roberta Flack	Joel Dorn, producer
1973	"Alone Again (Naturally)"	Gilbert O'Sullivan	Gordon Mills & Gilbert O'Sullivan, producers
1973	"American Pie"	Don McLean	Ed Freeman, producer
1973	"Song Sung Blue"	Neil Diamond	Tom Catalano & Neil Diamond, producers
1973	"Without You"	Harry Nilsson	Richard Perry, producer
1974	"Killing Me Softly with His Song"	Roberta Flack	Joel Dorn, producer
1974	"Bad, Bad Leroy Brown"	Jim Croce	Terry Cashman & Tommy West, producers
1974	"Behind Closed Doors"	Charlie Rich	Billy Sherrill, producer
1974	"You Are the Sunshine of My Life"	Stevie Wonder	Stevie Wonder, producer
1974	"You're So Vain"	Carly Simon	Richard Perry, producer
1975	"I Honestly Love You"	Olivia Newton-John	John Farrar, producer
1975	"Don't Let the Sun Go Down on Me"	Elton John	Gus Dudgeon, producer
1975	"Feel Like Makin' Love"	Roberta Flack	Rubina Flake, producer
1975	"Help Me"	Joni Mitchell	Joni Mitchell & Henry Lewy, producers
1975	"Midnight at the Oasis"	Maria Muldaur	Joe Boyd & Lenny Waronker, producers
1976	"Love Will Keep Us Together"	Captain & Tennille	Daryl Dragon, producer
1976	"At Seventeen"	Janis Ian	Brooks Arthur, producer
1976	"Lyin' Eyes"	Eagles	Bill Szymczyk, producer
1976	"Mandy"	Barry Manilow	Ron Dante, Barry Manilow & Clive Davis, producers
1976	"Rhinestone Cowboy"	Glen Campbell	Dennis Lambert & Brian Potter, producers
1977	"This Masquerade"	George Benson	Tommy LiPuma, producer
1977	"Afternoon Delight"	Starland Vocal Band	Milt Okun, producer
1977	"50 Ways to Leave Your Lover"	Paul Simon	Paul Simon & Phil Ramone, producers
1977	"I Write the Songs"	Barry Manilow	Ron Dante & Barry Manilow, producers
1977	"If You Leave Me Now"	Chicago	James Guercio, producer
1978	"Hotel California"	Eagles	Bill Szymczyk, producer
1978	"Blue Bayou"	Linda Ronstadt	Peter Asher, producer
1978	"Don't It Make My Brown Eyes Blue"	Crystal Gayle	Allen Reynolds, producer
1978	"Evergreen (Love Theme from A Star Is Born)"	Barbra Streisand	Barbra Streisand & Phil Ramone, producers
1978	"You Light Up My Life"	Debby Boone	Joe Brooks, producer
1979	"Just the Way You Are"	Billy Joel	Phil Ramone, producer
1979	"Baker Street"	Gerry Rafferty	Hugh Murphy & Gerry Rafferty, producers
1979	"Feels So Good"	Chuck Mangione	Chuck Mangione, producer
1979	"Stayin' Alive"	Bee Gees	Bee Gees, Albhy Galuten & Karl Richardson, producers
1979	"You Needed Me"	Anne Murray	Jim Ed Norman, producer

=== 1980s ===
Year^{[I]}	Record	Artist(s)	Production team
1980	"What a Fool Believes"	The Doobie Brothers	Ted Templeman, producer
1980	"After the Love Has Gone"	Earth, Wind & Fire	Maurice White, producer
1980	"The Gambler"	Kenny Rogers	Larry Butler, producer
1980	"I Will Survive"	Gloria Gaynor	Freddie Perren & Dino Fekaris, producers
1980	"You Don't Bring Me Flowers"	Barbra Streisand & Neil Diamond	Bob Gaudio, producer
1981	"Sailing"	Christopher Cross	Michael Omartian, producer
1981	"Lady"	Kenny Rogers	Lionel Richie, producer
1981	"The Rose"	Bette Midler	Paul A. Rothchild, producer
1981	"Theme from New York, New York"	Frank Sinatra	Sonny Burke, producer
1981	"Woman in Love"	Barbra Streisand	Gibb-Galuten-Richardson, producers
1982	"Bette Davis Eyes"	Kim Carnes	Val Garay, producer
1982	"Arthur's Theme (Best That You Can Do)"	Christopher Cross	Michael Omartian, producer
1982	"Endless Love"	Diana Ross & Lionel Richie	Lionel Richie, producer
1982	"Just the Two of Us"	Grover Washington Jr. with Bill Withers	Ralph MacDonald & Grover Washington Jr., producers
1982	"(Just Like) Starting Over"	John Lennon	John Lennon, Yoko Ono & Jack Douglas, producers
1983	"Rosanna"	Toto	Toto, producers
1983	"Always on My Mind"	Willie Nelson	Chips Moman, producer
1983	"Chariots of Fire"	Vangelis	Vangelis, producer
1983	"Ebony and Ivory"	Paul McCartney & Stevie Wonder	George Martin, producer
1983	"Steppin' Out"	Joe Jackson	David Kershenbaum & Joe Jackson, producers
1984	"Beat It"	Michael Jackson	Michael Jackson & Quincy Jones, producers
1984	"All Night Long (All Night)"	Lionel Richie	Lionel Richie & James Anthony Carmichael, producers
1984	"Every Breath You Take"	The Police	The Police & Hugh Padgham, producers
1984	"Flashdance... What a Feeling"	Irene Cara	Giorgio Moroder, producer
1984	"Maniac"	Michael Sembello	Phil Ramone & Michael Sembello, producers
1985	"What's Love Got to Do with It"	Tina Turner	Terry Britten, producer
1985	"Dancing in the Dark"	Bruce Springsteen	Jon Landau, Chuck Plotkin, Little Steven & Bruce Springsteen, producers
1985	"Girls Just Want to Have Fun"	Cyndi Lauper	Rick Chertoff, producer
1985	"Hard Habit to Break"	Chicago	David Foster, producer
1985	"The Heart of Rock & Roll"	Huey Lewis and the News	Huey Lewis and the News, producers
1986	"We Are the World"	USA for Africa	Quincy Jones, producer
1986	"Born in the U.S.A."	Bruce Springsteen	Jon Landau, Chuck Plotkin, Little Steven & Bruce Springsteen, producers
1986	"The Boys of Summer"	Don Henley	Don Henley, Danny Kortchmar, Greg Ladanyi & Mike Campbell, producers
1986	"Money for Nothing"	Dire Straits	Neil Dorfsman & Mark Knopfler, producers
1986	"The Power of Love"	Huey Lewis and the News	Huey Lewis and the News, producers
1987	"Higher Love"	Steve Winwood	Russ Titelman & Steve Winwood, producers
1987	"Addicted to Love"	Robert Palmer	Bernard Edwards, producer
1987	"Greatest Love of All"	Whitney Houston	Michael Masser, producer
1987	"Sledgehammer"	Peter Gabriel	Peter Gabriel & Daniel Lanois, producers
1987	"That's What Friends Are For"	Dionne Warwick & Friends (Elton John, Gladys Knight & Stevie Wonder)	Burt Bacharach & Carole Bayer Sager, producers
1988	"Graceland"	Paul Simon	Paul Simon, producer
1988	"Back in the High Life Again"	Steve Winwood	Russ Titelman & Steve Winwood, producers
1988	"La Bamba"	Los Lobos	Los Lobos & Mitchell Froom, producers
1988	"I Still Haven't Found What I'm Looking For"	U2	Brian Eno & Daniel Lanois, producers
1988	"Luka"	Suzanne Vega	Steve Addabbo & Lenny Kaye, producers
1989	"Don't Worry, Be Happy"	Bobby McFerrin	Linda Goldstein, producer
1989	"Fast Car"	Tracy Chapman	David Kershenbaum, producer
1989	"Giving You the Best That I Got"	Anita Baker	Michael J. Powell, producer
1989	"Man in the Mirror"	Michael Jackson	Michael Jackson & Quincy Jones, producers
1989	"Roll with It"	Steve Winwood	Steve Winwood & Tom Lord-Alge, producers

=== 1990s ===
Year^{[I]}	Record	Artist(s)	Production team
1990	"Wind Beneath My Wings"	Bette Midler	Arif Mardin, producer
1990	"The End of the Innocence"	Don Henley	Don Henley & Bruce Hornsby, producers
1990	"The Living Years"	Mike + The Mechanics	Christopher Neil & Mike Rutherford, producers
1990	"She Drives Me Crazy"	Fine Young Cannibals	David Z & Fine Young Cannibals, producers
1990	"We Didn't Start the Fire"	Billy Joel	Mick Jones & Billy Joel, producers
1991	"Another Day in Paradise"	Phil Collins	Hugh Padgham & Phil Collins, producers
1991	"From a Distance"	Bette Midler	Arif Mardin, producer
1991	"Nothing Compares 2 U"	Sinéad O'Connor	Sinéad O'Connor & Nellee Hooper, producers
1991	"U Can't Touch This"	MC Hammer	MC Hammer, producer
1991	"Vision of Love"	Mariah Carey	Rhett Lawrence & Narada Michael Walden, producers
1992	"Unforgettable"	Natalie Cole (With Nat King Cole)	David Foster, producer
1992	"Baby Baby"	Amy Grant	Keith Thomas, producer
1992	"(Everything I Do) I Do It for You"	Bryan Adams	Robert John "Mutt" Lange, producer
1992	"Losing My Religion"	R.E.M.	Scott Litt & R.E.M., producers
1992	"Something to Talk About"	Bonnie Raitt	Bonnie Raitt & Don Was, producers
1993	"Tears in Heaven"	Eric Clapton	Russ Titelman, producer
1993	"Achy Breaky Heart"	Billy Ray Cyrus	Joe Scaife & Jim Cotton, producers
1993	"Beauty and the Beast"	Celine Dion & Peabo Bryson	Walter Afanasieff, producer
1993	"Constant Craving"	k.d. lang	Greg Penny, Ben Mink & k.d. lang, producers
1993	"Save the Best for Last"	Vanessa Williams	Keith Thomas, producer
1994	"I Will Always Love You"	Whitney Houston	David Foster, producer
1994	"Harvest Moon"	Neil Young	Neil Young & Ben Keith, producers
1994	"If I Ever Lose My Faith in You"	Sting	Sting & Hugh Padgham, producers
1994	"The River of Dreams"	Billy Joel	Joe Nicolo & Danny Kortchmar, producers
1994	"A Whole New World"	Peabo Bryson & Regina Belle	Walter Afanasieff, producer
1995	"All I Wanna Do"	Sheryl Crow	Bill Bottrell, producer
1995	"He Thinks He'll Keep Her"	Mary Chapin Carpenter	Mary Chapin Carpenter & John Jennings, producers
1995	"I'll Make Love to You"	Boyz II Men	Babyface, producer
1995	"Love Sneakin' Up On You"	Bonnie Raitt	Don Was & Bonnie Raitt, producers
1995	"Streets of Philadelphia"	Bruce Springsteen	Bruce Springsteen & Chuck Plotkin, producers
1996	"Kiss from a Rose"	Seal	Trevor Horn, producer
1996	"Gangsta's Paradise"	Coolio	Doug Rasheed, producer
1996	"One of Us"	Joan Osborne	Rick Chertoff, producer
1996	"One Sweet Day"	Mariah Carey & Boyz II Men	Mariah Carey & Walter Afanasieff, producers
1996	"Waterfalls"	TLC	Patrick Brown, Rico Wade & Ray Murray, producers
1997	"Change the World"	Eric Clapton	Babyface, producer
1997	"1979"	The Smashing Pumpkins	Flood & Alan Moulder, producers
1997	"Because You Loved Me"	Celine Dion	David Foster, producer
1997	"Give Me One Reason"	Tracy Chapman	Tracy Chapman & Don Gehman, producers
1997	"Ironic"	Alanis Morissette	Glen Ballard, producer
1998	"Sunny Came Home"	Shawn Colvin	John Leventhal, producer
1998	"Everyday Is a Winding Road"	Sheryl Crow	Sheryl Crow, producer
1998	"I Believe I Can Fly"	R. Kelly	R. Kelly, producer
1998	"MMMBop"	Hanson	Dust Brothers & Stephen Lironi, producers
1998	"Where Have All the Cowboys Gone?"	Paula Cole	Paula Cole, producer
1999	"My Heart Will Go On"	Celine Dion	Walter Afanasieff, Simon Franglen & James Horner, producers; Simon Franglen, Humberto Gatica & David Gleeson, engineers/mixers
1999	"The Boy Is Mine"	Brandy & Monica	Dallas Austin, Brandy & Rodney Jerkins, producers; Leslie Brathwalte, Ben Garrison, Rodney Jerkins & Dexter Simmons, engineers/mixers
1999	"Iris"	Goo Goo Dolls	Rob Cavallo & Goo Goo Dolls, producers; Jack Joseph Puig & Allen Sides, engineers/mixers
1999	"Ray of Light"	Madonna	Madonna & William Orbit, producers; Pat McCarthy, engineer/mixer
1999	"You're Still the One"	Shania Twain	Robert John "Mutt" Lange, producer; Jeff Balding & Mike Shipley, engineers/mixers

=== 2000s ===
Year^{[I]}	Record	Artist(s)	Production team
2000	"Smooth"	Santana featuring Rob Thomas	Matt Serletic, producer; David Thoener, engineer/mixer
2000	"Believe"	Cher	Brian Rawling & Mark Taylor, producers; Mark Taylor, engineer/mixer
2000	"I Want It That Way"	Backstreet Boys	Kristian Lundin & Max Martin, producers; Kristian Lundin & Max Martin, engineers/mixers
2000	"Livin' la Vida Loca"	Ricky Martin	Desmond Child & Robi Rosa, producers; Charles Dye, engineer/mixer
2000	"No Scrubs"	TLC	Kevin "Shekspere" Briggs, producer; Leslie Brathwaite & Carlton Lynn, engineers/mixers
2001	"Beautiful Day"	U2	Brian Eno & Daniel Lanois, producers; Steve Lillywhite & Richard Rainey, engineer/mixers
2001	"Bye Bye Bye"	*NSYNC	Jake Lundin & Kristian Lundin, producers; Mike Tucker, engineer/mixer
2001	"I Try"	Macy Gray	Andrew Slater, producer; Darryl Swann & Dave Way, engineers/mixers
2001	"Music"	Madonna	Mirwais Ahmadzaï & Madonna, producers
2001	"Say My Name"	Destiny's Child	Rodney Jerkins, producer; LaShawn Daniels, Brad Gilderman & Jean-Marie Horvat, engineers/mixers
2002	"Walk On"	U2	Brian Eno & Daniel Lanois, producers; Steve Lillywhite & Richard Rainey, engineer/mixers
2002	"Drops of Jupiter"	Train	Brendan O'Brien, producer; Nick DiDia, Brendan O'Brien & Ryan Williams, engineer/mixers
2002	"Fallin'"	Alicia Keys	Alicia Keys, producer; Kerry "Krucial" Brothers & Russ Elevado, engineer/mixers
2002	"Ms. Jackson"	Outkast	Earthtone III, producer; John Frye & Neal H. Pogue, engineer/mixers
2002	"Video"	India.Arie	India.Arie & Carlos "Six July" Broady, producers; Kevin Haywood & Mike Shipley, engineer/mixers
2003	"Don't Know Why"	Norah Jones	Norah Jones, Arif Mardin & Jay Newland, producers; Arif Mardin & Jay Newland, engineers/mixers
2003	"Dilemma"	Nelly featuring Kelly Rowland	Bam & Ryan Bowser, producers; Brian Garten, engineer/mixer
2003	"How You Remind Me"	Nickelback	Nickelback & Rick Parashar, producers; Joey Moi & Randy Staub, engineers/mixers
2003	"A Thousand Miles"	Vanessa Carlton	Ron Fair, producer; Tal Herzberg, Jack Joseph Puig & Michael C. Ross, engineers/mixers
2003	"Without Me"	Eminem	Jeff Bass & Eminem, producers; Steve King, engineer/mixer
2004	"Clocks"	Coldplay	Coldplay & Ken Nelson, producers; Coldplay, Ken Nelson & Mark Phythian, engineers/mixers
2004	"Crazy in Love"	Beyoncé featuring Jay-Z	Rich Harrison & Beyoncé Knowles, producers; Jim Caruana & Tony Maserati, engineers/mixers
2004	"Hey Ya!"	Outkast	André 3000, producer; Kevin "KD" Davis, John Frye, Robert Hannon, Pete Novak & Neal Pogue, engineers/mixers
2004	"Lose Yourself"	Eminem	Eminem, producer; Eminem, Steve King & Michael Strange Jr., engineers/mixers
2004	"Where Is the Love?"	The Black Eyed Peas & Justin Timberlake	Ron Fair & will.i.am, producers; Dylan Dresdow & Tony Maserati, engineers/mixers
2005	"Here We Go Again"	Ray Charles & Norah Jones	John Burk, producer; Mark Fleming, Terry Howard & Al Schmitt, engineers/mixers
2005	"American Idiot"	Green Day	Billie Joe Armstrong, Rob Cavallo, Mike Dirnt & Tré Cool, producers; Chris Lord-Alge & Doug McKean, engineers/mixers
2005	"Heaven"	Los Lonely Boys	John Porter, producer; Steve Chadie & John Porter, engineers/mixers
2005	"Let's Get It Started"	The Black Eyed Peas	will.i.am, producer; Mark "Spike" Stent & will.i.am, engineers/mixers
2005	"Yeah"	Usher featuring Lil Jon & Ludacris	Jonathan "Lil Jon" Smith, producer; John Frye, Donnie Scantz, Jonathan "Lil Jon" Smith, The Trak Starz & Mark Vinten, engineers/mixers
2006	"Boulevard of Broken Dreams"	Green Day	Rob Cavallo & Green Day, producers; Chris Lord-Alge & Doug McKean, engineers/mixers
2006	"Feel Good Inc."	Gorillaz featuring De La Soul	Jason Cox, Danger Mouse, Dring & Gorillaz, producers; Jason Cox, Danger Mouse & Gorillaz, engineers/mixers
2006	"Gold Digger"	Kanye West	Jon Brion & Kanye West, producers; Tom Biller, Andrew Dawson, Mike Dean & Anthony Kilhoffer, engineers/mixers
2006	"Hollaback Girl"	Gwen Stefani	The Neptunes, producers; Andrew Coleman & Phil Tan, engineers/mixers
2006	"We Belong Together"	Mariah Carey	Mariah Carey, Jermaine Dupri & Manuel Seal, producers; Brian Garten, John Horesco IV & Phil Tan, engineers/mixers
2007	"Not Ready to Make Nice"	Dixie Chicks	Rick Rubin, producer; Richard Dodd, Jim Scott & Chris Testa, engineers/mixers
2007	"Be Without You"	Mary J. Blige	Bryan-Michael Cox & Ron Fair producers; Danny Cheung, Tal Herzberg, Dave "Hard-Drive" Pensado & Allen Sides, engineers/mixers
2007	"Crazy"	Gnarls Barkley	Danger Mouse, producer; Ben H. Allen, Danger Mouse & Kennie Takahashi, engineers/mixers
2007	"Put Your Records On"	Corinne Bailey Rae	Steve Chrisanthou, producer; Steve Chrisanthou & Jeremy Wheatley, engineers/mixers
2007	"You're Beautiful"	James Blunt	Tom Rothrock, producer; Tom Rothrock & Mike Tarantino, engineers/mixers
2008	"Rehab"	Amy Winehouse	Mark Ronson, producer; Tom Elmhirst, Mark Ronson, Dom Morley, Vaughan Merrick & Gabriel Roth, engineers/mixers
2008	"Irreplaceable"	Beyoncé	Beyoncé Knowles, Shaffer Smith & Stargate, producers; Jim Caruana, Jason Goldstein & Geoff Rice, engineers/mixers
2008	"The Pretender"	Foo Fighters	Gil Norton, producer; Adrian Bushby & Rich Costey, engineers/mixers
2008	"Umbrella"	Rihanna featuring Jay-Z	Kuk Harrell & C. "Tricky" Stewart, producers; Kuk Harrell & Manny Marroquin, engineers/mixers
2008	"What Goes Around... Comes Around"	Justin Timberlake	Nate (Danja) Hills, Timbaland & Justin Timberlake, producers; Jimmy Douglass & Timbaland, engineers/mixers
2009	"Please Read the Letter"	Robert Plant & Alison Krauss	T Bone Burnett, producer; Mike Piersante, engineer/mixer
2009	"Bleeding Love"	Leona Lewis	Simon Cowell, Clive Davis & Ryan Tedder, producers; Craig Durrance, Phil Tan & Ryan Tedder, engineers/mixers
2009	"Chasing Pavements"	Adele	Eg White, producer; Tom Elmhirst & Steve Price, engineer/mixers
2009	"Paper Planes"	M.I.A.	Diplo, producer; Switch, engineer/mixer
2009	"Viva la Vida"	Coldplay	Markus Dravs, Brian Eno & Rik Simpson, producers; Michael Brauer & Rik Simpson, engineers/mixers

=== 2010s ===
Year^{[I]}	Record	Artist(s)	Production team
2010	"Use Somebody"	Kings of Leon	Jacquire King & Angelo Petraglia, producers; Jacquire King, engineer/mixer
2010	"Halo"	Beyoncé	Beyoncé Knowles & Ryan Tedder, producers; Jim Caruana, Mark "Spike" Stent & Ryan Tedder, engineers/mixers
2010	"I Gotta Feeling"	The Black Eyed Peas	David Guetta & Frederick Riesterer, producers; will.i.am, Dylan "3-D" Dresdow & Padraic "Padlock" Kerin, engineers/mixers
2010	"Poker Face"	Lady Gaga	RedOne, producer; Robert Orton, RedOne & Dave Russell, engineers/mixers
2010	"You Belong with Me"	Taylor Swift	Nathan Chapman & Taylor Swift, producers; Chad Carlson & Justin Niebank, engineers/mixers
2011	"Need You Now"	Lady Antebellum	Lady Antebellum & Paul Worley, producers; Clarke Schleicher, engineer/mixer
2011	"Empire State of Mind"	Jay-Z featuring Alicia Keys	Angela Hunte, Jane't "Jnay" Sewell-Ulepic & Al Shux, producers; Ken Duro Ifill, Gimel "Young Guru" Keaton & Ann Mincieli, engineers/mixers
2011	"Fuck You"	CeeLo Green	The Smeezingtons, producers; Manny Marroquin & Graham Marsh, engineers/mixers
2011	"Love the Way You Lie"	Eminem featuring Rihanna	Alex da Kid & Makeba Riddick, producers; Alex da Kid, Eminem & Mike Strange, engineers/mixers
2011	"Nothin' on You"	B.o.B featuring Bruno Mars	The Smeezingtons, producers; Ari Levine, engineer/mixer
2012	"Rolling in the Deep"	Adele	Paul Epworth, producer; Tom Elmhirst & Mark Rankin, engineers/mixers
2012	"The Cave"	Mumford & Sons	Markus Dravs, producer; Francois Chevallier & Ruadhri Cushnan, engineers/mixers
2012	"Firework"	Katy Perry	Mikkel S. Eriksen, Tor Erik Hermansen & Sandy Vee, producers; Mikkel S. Eriksen, Phil Tan, Sandy Vee & Miles Walker, engineers/mixers
2012	"Grenade"	Bruno Mars	The Smeezingtons, producers; Ari Levine & Manny Marroquin, engineers/mixers
2012	"Holocene"	Bon Iver	Justin Vernon, producer; Brian Joseph & Justin Vernon, engineers/mixers
2013	"Somebody That I Used to Know"	Gotye featuring Kimbra	Wally de Backer, producer; Wally de Backer & François Tétaz, engineers/mixers; William Bowden, mastering engineer
2013	"Lonely Boy"	The Black Keys	The Black Keys & Danger Mouse, producers; Tom Elmhirst & Kennie Takahashi, engineers/mixers; Brian Lucey, mastering engineer
2013	"Stronger (What Doesn't Kill You)"	Kelly Clarkson	Greg Kurstin, producer; Serban Ghenea, John Hanes, Greg Kurstin & Jesse Shatkin, engineers/mixers; Chris Gehringer, mastering engineer
2013	"Thinkin Bout You"	Frank Ocean	Frank Ocean, producer; Jeff Ellis, Pat Thrall & Marcos Tovar, engineers/mixers; Vlado Meller, mastering engineer
2013	"We Are Never Ever Getting Back Together"	Taylor Swift	Max Martin, Shellback & Taylor Swift, producers; Serban Ghenea, engineer/mixer; Tom Coyne, mastering engineer
2013	"We Are Young"	Fun. featuring Janelle Monáe	Jeff Bhasker, producer; Jeff Bhasker, Andrew Dawson & Stuart White, engineers/mixers; Chris Gehringer, mastering engineer
2014	"Get Lucky"	Daft Punk featuring Pharrell Williams & Nile Rodgers	Thomas Bangalter & Guy-Manuel de Homem-Christo, producers; Peter Franco, Mick Guzauski, Florian Lagatta & Daniel Lerner, engineers/mixers; Antoine Chabert & Bob Ludwig, mastering engineer
2014	"Blurred Lines"	Robin Thicke featuring T.I. & Pharrell Williams	Pharrell Williams, producer; Andrew Coleman & Tony Maserati, engineers/mixers; Chris Gehringer, mastering engineer
2014	"Locked Out of Heaven"	Bruno Mars	Jeff Bhasker, Emile Haynie, Mark Ronson & The Smeezingtons, producers; Alalal, Josh Blair, Wayne Gordon, Ari Levine, Manny Marroquin & Mark Ronson, engineers/mixers; David Kutch, mastering engineer
2014	"Radioactive"	Imagine Dragons	Alex da Kid, producer; Manny Marroquin & Josh Mosser, engineers/mixers; Joe LaPorta, mastering engineer
2014	"Royals"	Lorde	Joel Little, producer; Joel Little, engineer/mixer; Stuart Hawkes, mastering engineer
2015	"Stay with Me" (Darkchild Version)	Sam Smith	Steve Fitzmaurice, Rodney Jerkins & Jimmy Napes, producers; Steve Fitzmaurice, Jimmy Napes & Steve Price, engineers/mixers; Tom Coyne, mastering engineer
2015	"All About That Bass"	Meghan Trainor	Kevin Kadish, producer; Kevin Kadish, engineer/mixer; Dave Kutch, mastering engineer
2015	"Chandelier"	Sia	Greg Kurstin & Jesse Shatkin, producers; Greg Kurstin, Manny Marroquin & Jesse Shatkin, engineers/mixers; Emily Lazar, mastering engineer
2015	"Fancy"	Iggy Azalea featuring Charli XCX	The Arcade & The Invisible Men, producers; John Armstrong, Anthony Kilhoffer & Eric Weaver, engineers/mixers; Miles Showell, mastering engineer
2015	"Shake It Off"	Taylor Swift	Max Martin & Shellback, producers; Serban Ghenea, John Hanes, Sam Holland & Michael Ilbert, engineers/mixers; Tom Coyne, mastering engineer
2016	"Uptown Funk"	Mark Ronson featuring Bruno Mars	Jeff Bhasker, Bruno Mars & Mark Ronson, producers; Josh Blair, Serban Ghenea, Wayne Gordon, John Hanes, Inaam Haq, Boo Mitchell, Charles Moniz & Mark Ronson, engineers/mixers; Tom Coyne, mastering engineer
2016	"Blank Space"	Taylor Swift	Max Martin & Shellback, producers; Serban Ghenea, John Hanes, Sam Holland & Michael Ilbert, engineers/mixers; Tom Coyne, mastering engineer
2016	"Can't Feel My Face"	The Weeknd	Max Martin & Ali Payami, producers; Serban Ghenea, John Hanes & Sam Holland, engineers/mixers; Tom Coyne, mastering engineer
2016	"Really Love"	D'Angelo & The Vanguard	D'Angelo, producer; Russell Elevado & Ben Kane, engineers/mixers; Dave Collins, mastering engineer
2016	"Thinking Out Loud"	Ed Sheeran	Jake Gosling, producer; Jake Gosling, Mark "Spike" Stent & Geoff Swan, engineers/mixers; Stuart Hawkes, mastering engineer
2017	"Hello"	Adele	Greg Kurstin, producer; Julian Burg, Tom Elmhirst, Emile Haynie, Greg Kurstin, Liam Nolan & Alex Pasco & Joe Visciano, engineers/mixers; Tom Coyne & Randy Merrill, mastering engineers
2017	"7 Years"	Lukas Graham	Future Animals & Pilo, producers; Delbert Bowers, Sebastian Fogh, Stefan Forrest & David LaBrel, engineers/mixers; Tom Coyne, mastering engineer
2017	"Formation"	Beyoncé	Beyoncé Knowles, Mike Will Made It & Pluss, producers; Jaycen Joshua & Stuart White, engineers/mixers; Dave Kutch, mastering engineer
2017	"Stressed Out"	Twenty One Pilots	Mike Elizondo & Tyler Joseph, producers; Neal Avron & Adam Hawkins, engineers/mixers; Chris Gehringer, mastering engineer
2017	"Work"	Rihanna featuring Drake	Boi-1da, producer; Noel "Gadget" Campbell, Kuk Harrell, Manny Marroquin, Noah "40" Shebib & Marcos Tovar, engineers/mixers; Chris Gehringer, mastering engineer
2018	"24K Magic"	Bruno Mars	Shampoo Press & Curl, producers; Serban Ghenea, John Hanes & Charles Moniz, engineers/mixers; Tom Coyne, mastering engineer
2018	"Despacito"	Luis Fonsi & Daddy Yankee featuring Justin Bieber	Josh Gudwin, Mauricio Rengifo & Andrés Torres, producers; Josh Gudwin, Jaycen Joshua, Chris 'TEK' O'Ryan, Mauricio Rengifo, Juan G Rivera "Gaby Music", Luis "Salda" Saldarriaga & Andrés Torres, engineers/mixers; Dave Kutch, mastering engineer
2018	"Humble"	Kendrick Lamar	Asheton Hogan & Mike Will Made It, producers; Derek "MixedByAli" Ali, James Hunt & Matt Schaeffer, engineers/mixers; Mike Bozzi, mastering engineer
2018	"Redbone"	Childish Gambino	Donald Glover & Ludwig Göransson, producers; Donald Glover, Ludwig Göransson, Riley Mackin & Ruben Rivera, engineers/mixers; Bernie Grundman, mastering engineer
2018	"The Story of O.J."	Jay-Z	Jay-Z & No I.D., producers; Jimmy Douglass & Gimel "Young Guru" Keaton, engineers/mixers; Dave Kutch, mastering engineer
2019	"This Is America"	Childish Gambino	Donald Glover & Ludwig Göransson, producers; Derek "MixedByAli" Ali, Kesha Lee, Riley Mackin, Shaan Singh & Alex Tumay, engineers/mixers; Mike Bozzi, mastering engineer
2019	"All the Stars"	Kendrick Lamar & SZA	Al Shux & Sounwave, producers; Sam Ricci & Matt Schaeffer, engineers/mixers; Mike Bozzi, mastering engineer
2019	"God's Plan"	Drake	Boi-1da, Cardo & Young Exclusive, producers; Noel Cadastre, Noel "Gadget" Campbell & Noah Shebib, engineers/mixers; Chris Athens, mastering engineer
2019	"I Like It"	Cardi B, Bad Bunny & J Balvin	Invincible, J. White Did It, Craig Kallman & Tainy, producers; Leslie Brathwaite, Kuk Harrell, Evan LaRay & Simone Torres, engineers/mixers; Colin Leonard, mastering engineer
2019	"The Joke"	Brandi Carlile	Dave Cobb & Shooter Jennings, producers; Tom Elmhirst & Eddie Spear, engineers/mixers; Pete Lyman, mastering engineer
2019	"The Middle"	Zedd, Maren Morris & Grey	Grey, The Monsters and the Strangerz & Zedd, producers; Grey, Tom Norris, Ryan Shanahan & Zedd, engineers/mixers; Mike Marsh, mastering engineer
2019	"Rockstar"	Post Malone featuring 21 Savage	Louis Bell & Tank God, producers; Louis Bell, Lorenzo Cardona, Manny Marroquin & Ethan Stevens, engineers/mixers; Mike Bozzi, mastering engineer
2019	"Shallow"	Lady Gaga & Bradley Cooper	Lady Gaga & Benjamin Rice, producers; Brandon Bost & Tom Elmhirst, engineers/mixers; Randy Merrill, mastering engineer

=== 2020s ===
Year^{[I]}	Record	Artist(s)	Production team
2020	"Bad Guy"	Billie Eilish	Finneas, producer; Rob Kinelski & Finneas, engineers/mixers; John Greenham, mastering engineer
2020	"7 Rings"	Ariana Grande	Charles Anderson, Tommy Brown, Michael Foster & Victoria Monet, producers; Serban Ghenea, John Hanes, Billy Hickey & Brendan Morawski, engineers/mixers; Randy Merrill, mastering engineer
2020	"Hard Place"	H.E.R.	Rodney "Darkchild" Jerkins, producer; Joseph Hurtado, Jaycen Joshua, Derek Keota & Miki Tsutsumi, engineers/mixers; Colin Leonard, mastering engineer
2020	"Hey, Ma"	Bon Iver	BJ Burton, Brad Cook, Chris Messina & Justin Vernon, producers; BJ Burton, Zach Hansen & Chris Messina, engineers/mixers; Greg Calbi, mastering engineer
2020	"Old Town Road"	Lil Nas X featuring Billy Ray Cyrus	Andrew "VoxGod" Bolooki, Jocelyn "Jozzy" Donald & YoungKio, producers; Andrew "VoxGod" Bolooki & Cinco & Joe Grasso, engineers/mixers; Eric Lagg, mastering engineer
2020	"Sunflower"	Post Malone & Swae Lee	Louis Bell & Carter Lang, producers; Louis Bell & Manny Marroquin, engineers/mixers; Mike Bozzi, mastering engineer
2020	"Talk"	Khalid	Disclosure & Denis Kosiak, producers; Ingmar Carlson, Jon Castelli, Josh Deguzman, John Kercy, Denis Kosiak, Guy Lawrence & Michael Romero, engineers/mixers; Dale Becker, mastering engineer
2020	"Truth Hurts"	Lizzo	Ricky Reed & Tele, producers; Chris Galland, Manny Marroquin & Ethan Shumaker, engineers/mixers; Chris Gehringer, mastering engineer
2021	"Everything I Wanted"	Billie Eilish	Finneas, producer; Rob Kinelski & Finneas, engineers/mixers; John Greenham, mastering engineer
2021	"Black Parade"	Beyoncé	Beyoncé & Derek Dixie, producers; Stuart White, engineer/mixer; Colin Leonard, mastering engineer
2021	"Circles"	Post Malone	Louis Bell, Frank Dukes & Post Malone, producers; Louis Bell & Manny Marroquin, engineers/mixers; Mike Bozzi, mastering engineer
2021	"Colors"	Black Pumas	Adrian Quesada, producer; Adrian Quesada, engineer/mixer; JJ Golden, mastering engineer
2021	"Don't Start Now"	Dua Lipa	Caroline Ailin & Ian Kirkpatrick, producers; Josh Gudwin, Drew Jurecka & Ian Kirkpatrick, engineers/mixers; Chris Gehringer, mastering engineer
2021	"Rockstar"	DaBaby featuring Roddy Ricch	SethinTheKitchen, producer; Derek "MixedByAli" Ali, Chris Dennis & Liz Robson, engineers/mixers; Susan Tabor, mastering engineer
2021	"Savage"	Megan Thee Stallion featuring Beyoncé	Beyoncé & J. White Did It, producers; Stuart White, engineer/mixer; Colin Leonard, mastering engineer
2021	"Say So"	Doja Cat	Tyson Trax, producer; Clint Gibbs, engineer/mixer; Mike Bozzi, mastering engineer
2022	"Leave the Door Open"	Silk Sonic	Dernst "D'Mile" Emile II & Bruno Mars, producers; Serban Ghenea, John Hanes & Charles Moniz, engineers/mixers; Randy Merrill, mastering engineer
2022	"Drivers License"	Olivia Rodrigo	Daniel Nigro, producer; Mitch McCarthy & Nigro, engineers/mixers; Randy Merrill, mastering engineer
2022	"Freedom"	Jon Batiste	Jon Batiste, Kizzo & Autumn Rowe, producers; Russ Elevado, Kizzo & Manny Marroquin, engineers/mixers; Emerson Mancini, mastering engineer
2022	"Happier Than Ever"	Billie Eilish	Finneas, producer; Billie Eilish, Finneas & Rob Kinelski, engineers/mixers; Dave Kutch, mastering engineer
2022	"I Get a Kick Out of You"	Tony Bennett & Lady Gaga	Dae Bennett, producer; Dae Bennett & Josh Coleman, engineers/mixers; Greg Calbi & Steve Fallone, mastering engineers
2022	"I Still Have Faith in You"	ABBA	Benny Andersson & Björn Ulvaeus, producers; Benny Andersson & Bernard Löhr, engineers/mixers; Björn Engelmann, mastering engineer
2022	"Kiss Me More"	Doja Cat featuring SZA	Rogét Chahayed, Tizhimself & Yeti Beats, producers; Rob Bisel, Serban Ghenea, Rian Lewis & Joe Visciano, engineers/mixers; Mike Bozzi, mastering engineer
2022	"Montero (Call Me By Your Name)"	Lil Nas X	Omer Fedi, Roy Lenzo & Take a Daytrip, producers; Denzel Baptiste, Serban Ghenea & Roy Lenzo, engineers/mixers; Chris Gehringer, mastering engineer
2022	"Peaches"	Justin Bieber featuring Daniel Caesar and Giveon	Josh Gudwin, Harv, Shndo & Andrew Watt producers; Josh Gudwin & Andrew Watt, engineers/mixers; Colin Leonard, mastering engineer
2022	"Right on Time"	Brandi Carlile	Dave Cobb & Shooter Jennings, producers; Brandon Bell & Tom Elmhirst, engineers/mixers; Pete Lyman, mastering engineer
2023	"About Damn Time"	Lizzo	Ricky Reed & Blake Slatkin, producers; Patrick Kehrier, Bill Malina & Manny Marroquin, engineers/mixers; Emerson Mancini, mastering engineer
2023	"As It Was"	Harry Styles	Tyler Johnson & Kid Harpoon, producers; Jeremy Hatcher & Spike Stent, engineers/mixers; Randy Merrill, mastering engineer
2023	"Bad Habit"	Steve Lacy	Steve Lacy, producer; Neal Pogue & Karl Wingate, engineers/mixers; Mike Bozzi, mastering engineer
2023	"Break My Soul"	Beyoncé	Beyoncé, Terius "The-Dream" Gesteelde-Diamant, Jens Christian Isaksen & Christopher "Tricky" Stewart, producers; Brandon Harding, Chris McLaughlin & Stuart White, engineers/mixers; Colin Leonard, mastering engineer
2023	"Don't Shut Me Down"	ABBA	Benny Andersson, producer; Benny Andersson & Bernard Löhr, engineers/mixers; Björn Engelmann, mastering engineer
2023	"Easy on Me"	Adele	Greg Kurstin, producer; Julian Burg, Tom Elmhirst & Greg Kurstin, engineers/mixers; Randy Merrill, mastering engineer
2023	"Good Morning Gorgeous"	Mary J. Blige	D'Mile & H.E.R., producers; Bryce Bordone, Serban Ghenea & Pat Kelly, engineers/mixers
2023	"The Heart Part 5"	Kendrick Lamar	Beach Noise, producer; Beach Noise, Rob Bisel, Ray Charles Brown Jr., James Hunt, Johnny Kosich, Matt Schaeffer & Johnathan Turner, engineers/mixers; Emerson Mancini, mastering engineer
2023	"Woman"	Doja Cat	Crate Classics, Linden Jay, Aynzli Jones & Yeti Beats, producers; Jesse Ray Ernster, Tyler Sheppard, Kalani Thompson & Rian Lewis, engineers/mixers; Mike Bozzi, mastering engineer
2023	"You and Me on the Rock"	Brandi Carlile featuring Lucius	Dave Cobb & Shooter Jennings, producers; Brandon Bell, Tom Elmhirst & Michael Harris, engineers/mixers; Pete Lyman, mastering engineer
2024	"Flowers"	Miley Cyrus	Kid Harpoon & Tyler Johnson, producers; Michael Pollack, Brian Rajaratnam & Mark "Spike" Stent, engineers/mixers; Joe LaPorta, mastering engineer
2024	"Anti-Hero"	Taylor Swift	Jack Antonoff & Taylor Swift, producers; Jack Antonoff, Serban Ghenea, Laura Sisk & Lorenzo Wolff, engineers/mixers; Randy Merrill, mastering engineer
2024	"Kill Bill"	SZA	Rob Bisel & Carter Lang, producers; Rob Bisel, engineer/mixer; Dale Becker, mastering engineer
2024	"Not Strong Enough"	Boygenius	Boygenius & Catherine Marks, producers; Owen Lantz, Catherine Marks, Mike Mogis, Bobby Mota, Kaushlesh "Garry" Purohit & Sarah Tudzin, engineers/mixers; Pat Sullivan, mastering engineer
2024	"On My Mama"	Victoria Monét	Deputy, Dernst Emile II & Jeff Gitelman, producers; Patrizio Pigliapoco & Todd Robinson, engineers/mixers; Colin Leonard, mastering engineer
2024	"Vampire"	Olivia Rodrigo	Dan Nigro, producer; Serban Ghenea, Michael Harris, Chris Kasych, Dan Nigro & Dan Viafore, engineers/mixers; Randy Merrill, mastering engineer
2024	"What Was I Made For?"	Billie Eilish	Billie Eilish & Finneas, producers; Billie Eilish, Rob Kinelski & Finneas, engineers/mixers; Chris Gehringer, mastering engineer
2024	"Worship"	Jon Batiste	Jon Batiste, Jon Bellion, Pete Nappi & Tenroc, producers; Serban Ghenea & Pete Nappi, engineers/mixers; Chris Gehringer, mastering engineer
2025	"Not Like Us"	Kendrick Lamar	Sean Momberger, Mustard & Sounwave, producers; Ray Charles Brown Jr. & Johnathan Turner, engineers/mixers; Nicolas de Porcel, mastering engineer
2025	"360"	Charli XCX	Cirkut & A. G. Cook, producers; Cirkut & Manny Marroquin, engineers/mixers; Idania Valencia, mastering engineer
2025	"Birds of a Feather"	Billie Eilish	Finneas & Billie Eilish, producers; Thom Beemer, Jon Castelli, Billie Eilish, Aron Forbes, Brad Lauchert, Finneas & Chaz Sexton, engineers/mixers; Dale Becker, mastering engineer
2025	"Espresso"	Sabrina Carpenter	Julian Bunetta, producer; Julian Bunetta & Jeff Gunnell, engineers/mixers; Nathan Dantzler, mastering engineer
2025	"Fortnight"	Taylor Swift featuring Post Malone	Jack Antonoff, Louis Bell & Taylor Swift, producers; Louis Bell, Bryce Bordone, Serban Ghenea, Sean Hutchinson, Oli Jacobs, Michael Riddleberger & Laura Sisk, engineers/mixers; Randy Merrill, mastering engineer
2025	"Good Luck, Babe!"	Chappell Roan	Dan Nigro, producer; Mitch McCarthy & Dan Nigro, engineers/mixers; Randy Merrill, mastering engineer
2025	"Now and Then"	The Beatles	Giles Martin & Paul McCartney, producers; Geoff Emerick, Steve Genewick, Jon Jacobs, Greg McAllister, Steve Orchard, Keith Smith, Mark 'Spike' Stent & Bruce Sugar, engineers/mixers; Miles Showell, mastering engineer
2025	"Texas Hold 'Em"	Beyoncé	Beyoncé, Nathan Ferraro, Killah B & Raphael Saadiq, producers; Hotae Alexander Jang, Alex Nibley & Stuart White, engineers/mixers; Colin Leonard, mastering engineer
2026	"Luther"	Kendrick Lamar & SZA	Jack Antonoff, Scott Bridgeway, M-Tech, roselilah, Sounwave & Kamasi Washington, producers; Jack Antonoff, Ray Charles Brown Jr., Hector Castro, Oli Jacobs, Jack Manning, Sean Matsukawa, Dani Perez, Tony Austin, Laura Sisk & Johnathan Turner, engineers/mixers; Ruairi O’Flaherty, mastering engineer
2026	"Abracadabra"	Lady Gaga	Cirkut, Lady Gaga & Andrew Watt, producers; Bryce Bordone, Serban Ghenea & Paul LaMalfa, engineers/mixers; Randy Merrill, mastering engineer
2026	"Anxiety"	Doechii	Doechii, producer; Jayda Love, engineer/mixer; Nicolas De Porcel, mastering engineer
2026	"APT."	Rosé & Bruno Mars	Rogét Chahayed, Cirkut, Omer Fedi & Bruno Mars, producers; Serban Ghenea, Charles Moniz, Bryce Bordone & Julian Vasquez, engineers/mixers; Chris Gehringer, mastering engineer
2026	"DTMF"	Bad Bunny	Scotty Dittrich, Julia Lewis, Hydra Hitz, La Paciencia, MAG & Tyler Spry, producers; Antonio Caraballo, Josh Gudwin, Roberto Rosado & Tyler Spry, engineers/mixers; Colin Leonard, mastering engineer
2026	"Manchild"	Sabrina Carpenter	Jack Antonoff & Sabrina Carpenter, producers; Jack Antonoff, Bryce Bordone, Jozef Caldwell, Serban Ghenea, Sean Hutchinson, Oli Jacobs, Michael Riddleberger & Laura Sisk, engineers/mixers; Ruairi O'Flaherty, mastering engineer
2026	"The Subway"	Chappell Roan	Daniel Nigro, producer; Chris Kaysch, Mitch McCarthy & Daniel Nigro, engineers/mixers; Randy Merrill, mastering engineer
2026	"Wildflower"	Billie Eilish	Finneas, producer; Jon Castelli, Aron Forbes & Finneas, engineers/mixers; Dale Becker, mastering engineer
2027	"Berghain"	Rosalía, Björk & Yves Tumor	Rosalía, Noah Goldstein, Sir Dylan & Jake Miller, producers; Jake Miller, David Rodríguez, Isaac Diskin, Harry Wilson, Daniel Cayotte, Tristan Hoogland & Manny Marroquin, engineers/mixers, Brian Lee & Bob Jackson, mastering engineer
2027	"Choosin' Texas"	Ella Langley	Ella Langley, Ben West, Miranda Lambert, producers; Devin Dawson & Dave Clauss, engineers/mixter; Pete Lyman, mastering engineer
2027	"The Cure"	Olivia Rodrigo	Dan Nigro, producer; Dan Nigro & Mitch McCarthy, engineers/mixers; Mike Bozzi, mastering engineer
2027	"Dracula"	Tame Impala & Jennie	Sarah Aarons & Kevin Parker, producers; Eric J. Dubowsky, Jung Eun-kyung & Kevin Parker, engineers/mixers; Matt Colton, mastering engineer
2027	"The Fate of Ophelia"	Taylor Swift	Max Martin, Shellback & Taylor Swift, producer; Lasse Mårtén, Max Martin, Serban Ghenea, Shellback, engineers/mixers; Randy Merrill, mastering engineer
2027	"I Just Might"	Bruno Mars	Rogét Chahayed, Cirkut, Omer Fedi & Bruno Mars, producers; Bryce Bordone, Serban Ghenea, Charles Moniz & Julian Vasquez, engineers/mixers; Chris Gehringer, mastering engineer
2027	"Man I Need"	Olivia Dean	Zach Nahome, producer; Charlie Holmes & Zach Nahome, engineers/mixers; Simon Francis, mastering engineer
2027	"Where Is My Husband!"	Raye	Raye, & Mike Sabath producers; Alex Robinson & Tony Maserati, engineers/mixers; Dale Becker, mastering engineer

^{^[I]} Each year is linked to the article about the Grammy Awards held that year.
