= Lil Pump discography =

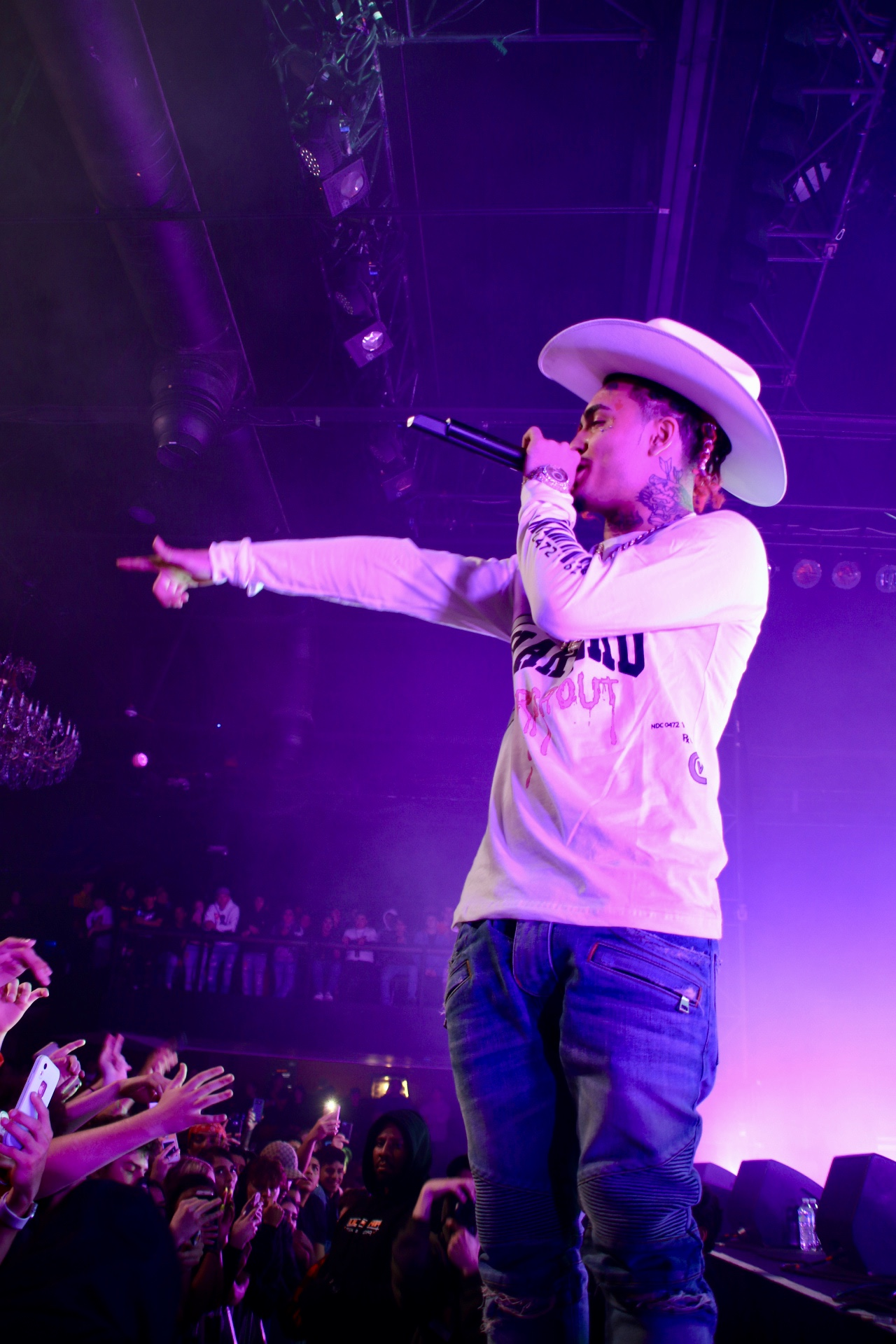
- Lil Pump performing in May 2019
- Studio albums: 3
- Singles: 38
- Music videos: 19
- Mixtapes: 1

The discography of American rapper Lil Pump consists of three studio albums, one mixtape, thirty-eight singles (including ten as featured artist) and nineteen music videos. Their first single to hit the Billboard Hot 100 was "Gucci Gang", debuting at number 81 and later peaking at number three on the chart. The single is certified quintuple platinum by the Recording Industry of America (RIAA).

In February 2016, Lil Pump released their debut single, "Lil Pump" and its follow up, "Elementary" the following month.

In October 2017, they released their debut studio album, Lil Pump, peaking at number three on the Billboard 200. It included the singles "Gucci Gang", "Boss", "D Rose" and "Molly". On February 22, 2019, they released their second studio album Harverd Dropout, which debuted at number seven on the US Billboard 200 with 48,000 album-equivalent units, 25,000 of which were pure album sales. They released a collaborative mixtape with frequent collaborator Ronny J titled No Name on December 10, 2021; a surprise release, it was met with commercial failure.

They released their third studio album, Lil Pump 2 on March 17, 2023. Despite positive reception, it failed to chart in any territory. The deluxe version of the album was released on September 15, 2023, containing new tracks: "6 Rings", "Glow in the Dark", "I Sell" and "Rick Rubin".

== Albums ==
=== Studio albums ===
List of studio albums, with selected chart positions, sales and certifications
Title	Album details	Peak chart positions										Certifications
Title	Album details	US	US R&B/HH	BEL	CAN	FIN	FRA	ITA	NL	NZ	SWE	Certifications
Lil Pump	Released: October 6, 2017; Label: Tha Lights Global, Warner; Format: CD, LP, cassette, digital download, streaming	3	2	80	6	10	52	19	46	33	20	RIAA: Gold; RMNZ: Gold
Harverd Dropout	Released: February 22, 2019; Label: Tha Lights Global, Warner; Format: CD, LP, digital download, streaming	7	3	36	7	19	46	55	21	—	35	RIAA: Gold; RMNZ: Gold
Lil Pump 2	Released: March 17, 2023; Label: Self-released; Format: digital download, streaming	—	—	—	—	—	—	—	—	—	—	
"—" denotes a recording that did not chart or was not released in that territory.

== Mixtapes ==
List of mixtapes, with selected details
Title	Mixtape details
No Name (with Ronny J)	Released: December 10, 2021; Label: Tha Lights Global, ONErpm; Format: CD, LP, digital download, streaming

== Singles ==
=== As lead artist ===
List of singles as lead artist, with selected chart positions
Title	Year	Peak chart positions										Certifications	Album
Title	Year	US	US R&B/HH	US Rap	AUS	CAN	GER	NZ	SWE	SWI	UK	Certifications	Album
"Elementary"	2016	—	—	—	—	—	—	—	—	—	—		Non-album singles
"Finesse the Pack" (featuring Lil Filth)	2016	—	—	—	—	—	—	—	—	—	—		Non-album singles
"30s"	2016	—	—	—	—	—	—	—	—	—	—		Non-album singles
"Splash"	2016	—	—	—	—	—	—	—	—	—	—		Non-album singles
"She Luvin'"	2016	—	—	—	—	—	—	—	—	—	—		Non-album singles
"Cash (I Ain't)"	2016	—	—	—	—	—	—	—	—	—	—		Non-album singles
"Trapspot"	2016	—	—	—	—	—	—	—	—	—	—		Non-album singles
"Drum$tick"	2016	—	—	—	—	—	—	—	—	—	—		Non-album singles
"On Larry"	2016	—	—	—	—	—	—	—	—	—	—		Non-album singles
"Gang Shit"	2016	—	—	—	—	—	—	—	—	—	—		Non-album singles
"Ignorant"	2016	—	—	—	—	—	—	—	—	—	—		Non-album singles
"Kilo" (featuring Smokepurpp)	2016	—	—	—	—	—	—	—	—	—	—		Non-album singles
"Johnny" (featuring Smokepurpp)	2016	—	—	—	—	—	—	—	—	—	—		Non-album singles
"Get"	2016	—	—	—	—	—	—	—	—	—	—		Non-album singles
"Had"	2016	—	—	—	—	—	—	—	—	—	—		Non-album singles
"Take"	2016	—	—	—	—	—	—	—	—	—	—		Non-album singles
"Bullshit (Kickstand)" (featuring Smokepurpp and Warhol.SS)	2016	—	—	—	—	—	—	—	—	—	—		Non-album singles
"Broke My Wrist" (featuring Smokepurpp)	2016	—	—	—	—	—	—	—	—	—	—		Non-album singles
"Obama"	2016	—	—	—	—	—	—	—	—	—	—		Non-album singles
"Movin'" (featuring Smokepurpp)	2017	—	—	—	—	—	—	—	—	—	—		Non-album singles
"Magic" (featuring Richysamo)	2017	—	—	—	—	—	—	—	—	—	—		Non-album singles
"OK" (featuring Smokepurpp)	2017	—	—	—	—	—	—	—	—	—	—		Non-album singles
"DestGang" (featuring Desto Dubb)	2017	—	—	—	—	—	—	—	—	—	—		Non-album singles
"Lil Pump"	2017	—	—	—	—	—	—	—	—	—	—		Non-album singles
"Boss"	2017	— (Note: "Boss" did not chart on the Billboard Hot 100, but peaked at number 1 on the Bubbling Under Hot 100 Singles chart.)	40	—	—	93	—	—	—	—	—	RIAA: Platinum	Lil Pump
"Flex Like Ouu"	2017	—	—	—	—	—	—	—	—	—	—	RIAA: Gold	Lil Pump
"D Rose"	2017	— (Note: "D Rose" did not chart on the Billboard Hot 100, but peaked at number 8 on the Bubbling Under Hot 100 Singles chart.)	48	—	—	—	—	—	—	—	—	RIAA: Gold	Lil Pump
"Molly"	2017	—	— (Note: "Molly" did not enter the Hot R&B/Hip-Hop Songs chart, but peaked at number 9 on the Bubbling Under R&B/Hip-Hop Singles chart.)	—	—	—	—	—	—	—	—		Lil Pump
"Fiji"	2017	—	—	—	—	—	—	—	—	—	—		Non-album singles
"Next" (featuring Rich the Kid)	2017	—	—	—	—	—	—	—	—	—	—		Non-album singles
"Talkin Sh*t" (with Famous Dex)	2017	—	—	—	—	—	—	—	—	—	—		Non-album singles
"Gucci Gang" (original or Spanish remix)	2017	3	2	2	18	3	35	15	19	25	27	RIAA: 5× Platinum; ARIA: 2× Platinum; BPI: Gold; BVMI: Gold; IFPI SWI: Gold; RMNZ: Platinum	Lil Pump
"Designer"	2017	—	—	—	—	—	—	—	—	—	—		Non-album single
"I Shyne" (with Carnage)	2018	— (Note: "I Shyne" did not chart on the Billboard Hot 100, but peaked at number 14 on the Bubbling Under Hot 100 Singles chart.)	49	—	—	95	—	—	—	—	—		Battered Bruised & Bloody
"Esskeetit"	2018	24	16	12	—	25	—	— (Note: "Esskeetit" did not enter the NZ Top 40 Singles Chart, but peaked at number five on the NZ Heatseeker Singles Chart.)	74	74	89	RIAA: Gold; RMNZ: Gold	Harverd Dropout
"Welcome to the Party" (solo or with Diplo and French Montana featuring Zhavia Ward, and remix with Valentino Khan)	2018	78	37	—	87	55	—	— (Note: "Welcome to the Party" did not enter the NZ Top 40 Singles Chart, but peaked at number eight on the NZ Heatseeker Singles Chart.)	—	—	—	RIAA: Platinum; ARIA: Gold; BPI: Silver	Deadpool 2
"Drug Addicts"	2018	83	45	—	—	52	—	—	— (Note: "Drug Addicts" did not enter the Swedish Singellista Chart, but peaked at number eight on the Swedish Heatseeker Chart.)	—	—		Harverd Dropout
"I Love It" (with Kanye West)	2018	6	5	5	4	1	9	1	1	6	3	RIAA: 2× Platinum; ARIA: 3× Platinum; BPI: Platinum; RMNZ: 2× Platinum	Harverd Dropout
"Multi Millionaire" (featuring Lil Uzi Vert)	2018	—	—	—	—	99	—	— (Note: "Multi Millionaire" did not enter the NZ Top 40 Singles Chart, but peaked at number 28 on the NZ Hot Singles Chart.)	—	—	—		Harverd Dropout
"Arms Around You" (with XXXTentacion featuring Maluma and Swae Lee)	2018	28	16	—	14	13	16	15	8	5	14	RIAA: Platinum; ARIA: Platinum; BPI: Gold; BVMI: Gold; RMNZ: Platinum	Non-album singles
"Trixx" (featuring Ronny J)	2018	—	—	—	—	—	—	—	—	—	—		Non-album singles
"Trap Jumpin'" (featuring Juicy J)	2018	—	—	—	—	—	—	—	—	—	—		Non-album singles
"Designer (On My Drip)" (featuring Dom Chasin' Paper)	2018	—	—	—	—	—	—	—	—	—	—		Non-album singles
"Lie Detector" (featuring 24hrs)	2018	—	—	—	—	—	—	—	—	—	—		Non-album singles
"Face Tats" (featuring Desto Dubb)	2018	—	—	—	—	—	—	—	—	—	—		Non-album singles
"Nun of Dat" (featuring BlocBoy JB)	2018	—	—	—	—	—	—	—	—	—	—		Simi
"Bankteller" (featuring Desto Dubb, Lil Uzi Vert, 03 Greedo, and Smokepurpp)	2018	—	—	—	—	—	—	—	—	—	—		Non-album single
"Butterfly Doors"	2019	81	37	—	—	48	—	— (Note: "Butterfly Doors" did not enter the NZ Top 40 Singles Chart, but peaked at number 11 on the NZ Hot Singles Chart.)	— (Note: "Butterfly Doors" did not enter the Swedish Singellista Chart, but peaked at number 20 on the Swedish Heatseeker Chart.)	85	—		Harverd Dropout
"Racks on Racks"	2019	— (Note: "Racks on Racks" did not chart on the Billboard Hot 100, but peaked at number two on the Bubbling Under Hot 100 Singles chart.)	46	—	—	77	—	— (Note: "Racks on Racks" did not enter the NZ Top 40 Singles Chart, but peaked at number five on the NZ Hot Singles Chart.)	— (Note: "Racks on Racks" did not enter the Swedish Singellista Chart, but peaked at number eight on the Swedish Heatseeker Chart.)	68	—		Harverd Dropout
"Be Like Me" (featuring Lil Wayne)	2019	72	33	—	—	47	—	— (Note: "Be Like Me" did not enter the NZ Top 40 Singles Chart, but peaked at number nine on the NZ Hot Singles Chart.)	—	—	—		Harverd Dropout
"Pose to Do" (featuring French Montana and Quavo)	2019	—	—	—	—	—	—	—	—	—	—		Non-album singles
"Hardy Brothers Freestyle" (featuring Smokepurpp)	2019	—	—	—	—	—	—	—	—	—	—		Non-album singles
"Instagrams" (featuring Desto Dubb)	2019	—	—	—	—	—	—	—	—	—	—		Non-album singles
"Shopping Spree" (featuring Murda Beatz and Sheck Wes)	2019	—	—	—	—	—	—	—	—	—	—		Non-album singles
"Pookie (Remix)" (featuring Aya Nakamura)	2019	—	—	—	—	—	—	—	—	—	—		Non-album singles
"Stack It Up" (featuring Ronny J)	2019	—	—	—	—	—	—	—	—	—	—		Non-album singles
"Outta Cage" (featuring Desto Dubb)	2019	—	—	—	—	—	—	—	—	—	—		Non-album singles
"Uno (Remix)" (with Ambjaay and Tyga)	2019	—	—	—	—	—	—	—	—	—	—		Non-album singles
"Illuminati" (with Anuel AA)	2020	—	—	—	—	—	—	—	—	—	—		Non-album singles
"You Know You Lit" (featuring Dobre Brothers)	2020	—	—	—	—	—	—	—	—	—	—		Non-album singles
"Off My Chest" (featuring Smokepurpp)	2020	—	—	—	—	—	—	—	—	—	—		Non-album singles
"Life Like Me"	2020	—	—	—	—	—	—	—	—	—	—		Non-album singles
"Watafuk?!" (with Morgenshtern)	2020	—	—	—	—	—	—	—	—	—	—		Non-album singles
"Goyard Batman" (with Aitch and The Plug)	2020	—	—	—	—	—	—	—	—	—	—		Non-album singles
"Lil Pimp Big Maga Steppin'"	2020	—	—	—	—	—	—	—	—	—	—		Non-album singles
"I'Monna"	2020	—	—	—	—	—	—	—	—	—	—		Non-album singles
"Racks to the Ceiling" (with Tory Lanez)	2021	—	—	—	—	—	—	—	—	—	—		No Name
"In da Way"	2021	—	—	—	—	—	—	—	—	—	—		Non-album singles
"Contacto" (with Nesi)	2021	—	—	—	—	—	—	—	—	—	—		Non-album singles
"BNB" (with Desto Dubb)	2021	—	—	—	—	—	—	—	—	—	—		Non-album singles
"Big Hoes" (with YN Jay)	2021	—	—	—	—	—	—	—	—	—	—		Non-album singles
"Mona Lisa" (with Soulja Boy)	2022	—	—	—	—	—	—	—	—	—	—		Non-album singles
"Toco Toco To (Remix)" (with Dixson Waz)	2022	—	—	—	—	—	—	—	—	—	—		Non-album singles
"All the Sudden"	2022	—	—	—	—	—	—	—	—	—	—		Lil Pump 2
"1st Off"	2022	—	—	—	—	—	—	—	—	—	—		Non-album single
"Splurgin'"	2022	—	—	—	—	—	—	—	—	—	—		Lil Pump 2
"I'm Back'"	2022	—	—	—	—	—	—	—	—	—	—		Non-album single
"Mosh Pit"	2022	—	—	—	—	—	—	—	—	—	—		Lil Pump 2
"She Know" (featuring Ty Dolla Sign)	2022	—	—	—	—	—	—	—	—	—	—		Lil Pump 2
"Walked"	2023	—	—	—	—	—	—	—	—	—	—		NBA 2K23 Soundtrack
"Tesla" (featuring Smokepurpp)	2023	—	—	—	—	—	—	—	—	—	—		Lil Pump 2 + (Deluxe)
"I Sell"	2023	—	—	—	—	—	—	—	—	—	—		Lil Pump 2 + (Deluxe)
"6 Rings"	2023	—	—	—	—	—	—	—	—	—	—		Lil Pump 2 + (Deluxe)
"Glow in the Dark"	2023	—	—	—	—	—	—	—	—	—	—		Lil Pump 2 + (Deluxe)
"Viagra & Cialis"	2024	—	—	—	—	—	—	—	—	—	—		Non-album singles
"Birkin'"	2024	—	—	—	—	—	—	—	—	—	—		Non-album singles
"American Hero"	2024	—	—	—	—	—	—	—	—	—	—		Non-album singles
"GIA Certified"	2024	—	—	—	—	—	—	—	—	—	—		Non-album singles
"No Hook 10"	2024	—	—	—	—	—	—	—	—	—	—		Non-album singles
"Face Card"	2025	—	—	—	—	—	—	—	—	—	—		Non-album singles
"Too Long"	2025	—	—	—	—	—	—	—	—	—	—		Non-album singles
"—" denotes a recording that did not chart or was not released in that territory.

=== As featured artist ===
List of singles as featured artist, with selected chart positions
Title	Year	Peak chart positions			Certifications	Album
Title	Year	US	CAN	UK	Certifications	Album
"Nephew" (Smokepurpp featuring Lil Pump)	2018	— (Note: "Nephew" did not enter the Billboard Hot 100, but peaked at number five on the Bubbling Under Hot 100 chart.)	96	—	RIAA: Gold	Non-album single
"Kept Back" (Gucci Mane featuring Lil Pump)	2018	—	—	—		Evil Genius
"Overseas" (Desiigner featuring Lil Pump)	2018	—	—	—		Non-album single
"Gnarly" (Kodak Black featuring Lil Pump)	2018	88	76	—	RIAA: Gold	Dying to Live
"Hello" (Ugly God featuring Lil Pump)	2019	—	—	—		Bumps & Bruises
"Coronao Now" (El Alfa featuring Lil Pump, and remix with El Alfa, Sech, and Myke Towers featuring Vin Diesel and Lil Pump)	2019	—	—	—		El Androide
"Poppin" (KSI featuring Lil Pump and Smokepurpp)	2020	—	—	43		Dissimulation
"Casanova" (Yo Yo Honey Singh featuring Lil Pump and DJ Shadow Dubai)	2022	—	—	—		Non-album singles
"Mala" (V Rod featuring Lil Pump)	2022	—	—	—		Non-album singles
"Kukareku" (Margo featuring Lil Pump)	2025	—	—	—		Non-album singles
"—" denotes a recording that did not chart or was not released.

== Other charted songs ==
Title	Year	Peak chart positions			Album
Title	Year	US Bub.	US R&B/HH Bub.	NZ Hot	Album
"Back" (featuring Lil Yachty)	2017	22	5	—	Lil Pump
"Iced Out" (featuring 2 Chainz)	2017	—	8	—	Lil Pump
"Baby Daddy" (Lil Yachty featuring Lil Pump and Offset)	2018	19	8	—	Lil Boat 2
"Drop Out"	2019	—	—	31	Harverd Dropout
"—" denotes a recording that did not chart or was not released in that territory.

== Guest appearances ==
List of guest appearances, with other performing artists, showing year released and album name
Title	Year	Other artist(s)	Album
"I'm Just Trappin'"	2015	Lil Ominous	—N/a
"Water"	2016	ion	—N/a
"Johnny"	2016	Smokepurpp	—N/a
"Wristwork"	2016	Richy Samo	The American Psycho EP
"Where's the Blow"	2016	Ski Mask the Slump God	Drown in Designer
"PistolGripPapi"	2016	Lil Sega	—N/a
"Count"	2016	Lil Ominous, Smokepurpp	—N/a
"Bitch!"	2016	Lil Ominous	—N/a
"Bullshit (Kickstand)"	2016	BrentRambo, Warhol.SS, Smokepurpp	—N/a
"Whippin'"	2016	Stepdadfla, Famous Dex	—N/a
"Trixxx"	2017	Ronny J	—N/a
"Two Guns"	2017	Famous Dex, Smokepurpp	—N/a
"Big Bank"	2017	iON	—N/a
"Magic"	2017	Richy Samo	—N/a
"OK"	2017	Smokepurpp	Deadstar
"Gucci Breakfast"	2017	Smokepurpp	—N/a
"M.O.B."	2017	Splash Zanotti, Riff Raff	—N/a
"DestGang"	2017	DestoDubb, Richy Samo	Thank You Fizzle
"Walked In Ready"	2017	JBan$, Lil Yachty	JBAN$2TURNT
"Trap Jumpin'"	2018	Juicy J	Shutdafukup
"Designer (On My Drip)"	2018	Dom Chasin' Paper	—N/a
"Lie Detector"	2018	24hrs	—N/a
"Baby Daddy"	2018	Lil Yachty, Offset	Lil Boat 2
"Face Tats"	2018	DestoDubb	Thank You Fizzle
"Choppa 4"	2018	Remember SJT	—N/a
"Nun Of Dat"	2018	BlocBoy JB	Simi
"Jetski Grizzley"	2018	Tee Grizzley	Activated
"Nephew"	2018	Smokepurpp	—N/a
"Ight"	2018	Blac Youngsta	—N/a
"Bankteller"	2018	DestoDubb, Lil Uzi Vert, Smokepurpp, 03 Greedo	—N/a
"Old Heads And Regretful Hoes"	2019	Chief Keef, Zaytoven	GloToven
"Rockets"	2019	Rich the Kid, Takeoff	The World Is Yours 2
"Pookie (Remix)"	2019	Aya Nakamura	—N/a
"Shopping Spree"	2019	Murda Beatz, Sheck Wes	—N/a
"Left Right"	2019	Smokepurpp	Deadstar 2
"Goyard"	2022	El Alfa	Sabiduria

== Music videos ==
=== As lead artist ===
List of music videos as lead artist, showing directors
Title	Year	Director(s)
"Finesse the Pack" (featuring Lil Filth)	2016	RAHEEMXP
"Lil Pump"	2016	RAHEEMXP
"Elementary"	2016	RAHEEMXP
"D Rose"	2017	Cole Bennett
"Flex Like Ouu"	2017	Cole Bennett
"Boss"	2017	Unknown
"Next" (featuring Rich the Kid)	2017	Unknown
"Talkin Sh*t" (with Famous Dex)	2017	Cole Bennett
"Gucci Gang"	2017	Ben Griffin
"Esskeetit"	2018	Lil Pump & Ben Griffin
"Welcome to the Party" (with Diplo and French Montana featuring Zhavia Ward)	2018	Jason Koenig
"Drug Addicts"	2018	Hannah Lux Davis
"I Love It" (with Kanye West featuring Adele Givens)	2018	Spike Jonze
"Butterfly Doors"	2019	Ben Griffin
"Racks on Racks"	2019	BRTHR
"Be Like Me" (featuring Lil Wayne)	2019	Sophie Muller
"Illuminati" (featuring Anuel AA)	2020	Spiff TV
"You Know you Lit" (featuring Dobre Brothers)	2020	Unknown
"Racks To The Ceiling" (featuring Tory Lanez)	2021	Unknown
"In Da Way"	2021	Louie Knows
"All the Sudden"	2022	Unknown
"Tesla" (featuring Smokepurpp)	2023	Unknown
"Curry Freestyle" (featuring N3on and Sneako)	2023	Unknown

=== As featured artist ===
Music video as featured artist, showing director
Title	Year	Director
"Kept Back" (Gucci Mane featuring Lil Pump)	2018	—
"Nephew" (Smokepurpp featuring Lil Pump)	2018	Millicent Hailes
"Poppin" (KSI featuring Lil Pump and Smokepurpp)	2020	Tajvs Taj
"Off My Chest" (Smokepurpp featuring Lil Pump)	2020	—

=== Cameo appearances ===
Cameo appearances on music videos, showing director
Title	Year	Director
"Feels Like Summer" (Childish Gambino)	2018	Ivan Dixon, Greg Sharp, Justin Richburg
