= Deadpool 2 (soundtrack) =

Original score and songs used in the film

Deadpool 2 (Original Motion Picture Score)

Film score by Tyler Bates
- Released: May 11, 2018
- Genres: Rock; Electronic; Orchestral
- Length: 37:02
- Labels: Sony Classical; Fox Music

Tyler Bates chronology
Atomic Blonde (2017)	Deadpool 2 (2018)	The Spy Who Dumped Me (2018)

Deadpool 2 (Original Motion Picture Soundtrack)

Soundtrack album by various artists
- Released: May 18, 2018
- Length: 43:54
- Label: Columbia

Singles from Deadpool 2 (Original Motion Picture Soundtrack)
- 1. "Ashes" Released: May 3, 2018; 2. "Welcome to the Party" Released: May 15, 2018

Deadpool 2 (Original Motion Picture Soundtrack) [Deluxe – Super Duper Cut]

Soundtrack album by various artists
- Released: August 10, 2018
- Length: 62:00
- Label: Columbia

The soundtrack for the 2018 American superhero film Deadpool 2, based on the Marvel Comics character Deadpool and distributed by 20th Century Fox, consists of an original score composed by Tyler Bates and a series of songs featured in the film. This includes an original single "Ashes", performed by Celine Dion. Bates had worked on all of director David Leitch's previous films before being hired to compose the score for Deadpool 2. In addition to the initial theatrical release of the film, beginning on May 18 in the United States, an extended cut of the film was released on home media on August 21 that featured additional music.

Bates joined the film after Junkie XL chose not to return from the first Deadpool, and approached the score with a slight rock sensibility. He attempted to write music that stayed out of the way of the film's comedy and complemented its dialogue, which was a challenge due to the constant changes being made to the film throughout the post-production process. In addition to an orchestra and electronic instrumentation such as an electric guitar, Bates' score includes a choir that sings explicit phrases which match the film's irreverent tone. This earned the score a parental advisory warning, making it the first score album to receive such a warning.

"Ashes" was released as a single on May 3, 2018. Bates' score was released as Deadpool 2 (Original Motion Picture Score) by Sony Classical on May 11. A soundtrack album collecting the previously released singles and other songs heard in the film was released by Columbia Records as Deadpool 2 (Original Motion Picture Soundtrack) on May 18. Bates' score received positive reviews, especially when compared to the reception of the first film's score, while the soundtrack songs were generally praised; "Ashes" in particular received positive responses from critics with some even suggesting it be nominated for an Academy Award. Columbia released an album featuring songs heard only in the film's extended cut as well as previously released songs on August 10.

== Background ==
Work on a sequel to the 2016 film Deadpool began before that film's release in February of that year, with the creative team of star/producer Ryan Reynolds, director Tim Miller, and writers Rhett Reese and Paul Wernick all set to return. However, Miller left the film that October citing "mutual creative differences" with Reynolds. Subsequently, Junkie XL announced he would not be returning for the sequel after composing the score for the first film, given that Miller was "the driving force behind" him working on that film in the first place. Miller was replaced as director for the sequel by David Leitch, and in October 2017 it was confirmed that Tyler Bates would be writing the score for Deadpool 2 after doing the same for Leitch's previous films.

== Original score ==
Bates felt his role was to stay out of the way of the film's comedy and instead support the action and emotional elements of the film. He described the film as "a true Rubik's Cube" to score because of all the different elements involved, and found a "learning curve" as he discovered how to balance these different parts of the film. Bates approached the music with a slight rock sensibility, and created an "obvious superhero theme" that he felt fit within the established X-Men franchise. Bates wrote a specific motif for the character Cable which is for both the electronic and orchestral sides of the score, and reflects the character's physique and weaponry.

Due to Deadpool's mask, the creative team was able to change the character's dialogue up to the film being officially completed; Reynolds took this opportunity to keep adding new jokes to the film as long as possible, with Bates consistently receiving new versions of the film to score throughout the post-production process. These new versions often included new timings for dialogue and jokes, and Bates had to adjust his music to match as Bates approached the film's dialogue as if it was the lead vocals of a song he was writing, for which his music would have to complement the tonal range and timbre of the characters' voices. This left very little time for Bates to prepare the final score for recording, and for the film's final sound mix to be delivered. Bates' pacing was also based on the film's editing, while the cinematography helped inspire the score's "tonal palette".

For the score, Bates used a distorted guitar run through a wah-wah pedal, microsynths to add "unique colors", and a choir. The choir originally sang "meaningless, faux-Latin phrases" for an aggressive vocal cue, which was being recorded on a day that Leitch was visiting the 20th Century Fox recording studio. Bates discussed with Leitch potentially replacing the nonsense phrases with scene-appropriate lyrics, and the pair worked during a 20-minute break in recording with choral contractor Sally Stevens and orchestrator-conductor Tim Williams to write the new lines. The lyrics they wrote, which follow the rhythm of the original music, include "you can't stop this motherfucker" and "holy shit balls!", which ultimately earned the score a parental advisory warning. It is the first score album to receive such a warning. Bates felt this was not "merit-less debauchery, it was just fun. It's very rare that we can work on something at such a high professional level that embraces the irreverence of Deadpool."

== Songs ==
Leitch felt that retaining the personal stakes of the first film by focusing on "an existential crisis and a deeply personal cause" for Deadpool was going to be more compelling for audiences than trying to build the film around global stakes, and as part of that he wanted to create an original song for the film that served as an emotional through-line for the film's characters in the vein of "Take My Breath Away" and "My Heart Will Go On". He and music supervisor John Houlihan "ended up discovering" the song "Ashes" as written by Petey Martin, Jordan Smith, and Tedd T. After further discussions between Leitch and Reynolds, the latter asked Céline Dion to record the song for the film. The soundtrack also features an original collaboration between Diplo, French Montana, Zhavia Ward, and Lil Pump called "Welcome to the Party".

As explained by co-writer Reese, the song "We Belong" by Pat Benatar was used in the film to illustrate the theme of family that they were exploring, and was almost used a second time during the X-Force parachuting sequence but was replaced with AC/DC's "Thunderstruck" which was used as a "pump me up" song—because of its "straight" tone and use in Iron Man 2—to help sell the excitement of the audience before the X-Force characters are unexpectedly killed. While writing the film's score, Bates was kept aware of the licensed songs that were being used in conjunction with his music because he felt it was "paramount" to his understanding of the film and Reynolds' intentions for it. He also attempted to compose the music on either side of each song in such a way that it could augment the songs and elevate their intended effects.

== Release ==
=== Singles ===
"Ashes" was released as a single by Columbia Records on May 3, 2018, along with a music video directed by Leitch. "Welcome to the Party" was released on May 15.

=== Deadpool 2 (Original Motion Picture Score) ===
Sony Classical and Fox Music released a score album for the film on May 11, 2018. It is the first score album to receive a parental advisory warning—it is labelled "Parental Advisory: Explicit Content" for the phrases sung by the choir in the score. A vinyl release for the album was released on August 17.

==== Standard release ====
All music composed by Tyler Bates:

No.	Title	Length
1.	"X-Men Arrive"	0:58
2.	"Fighting Dirty"	2:03
3.	"Hello Super Powers"	0:57
4.	"Escape"	2:13
5.	"Vanessa"	1:55
6.	"Weasel Interrogation"	1:11
7.	"Holy S*** Balls"	1:32
8.	"Mutant Convoy"	3:59
9.	"The Name is Cable"	1:23
10.	"Sorry for Your Loss"	1:01
11.	"You Can’t Stop this Mother F*****"	1:10
12.	"Ice Box"	1:19
13.	"Docking"	1:16
14.	"Make the Whole World our B****"	3:15
15.	"Pity D***"	0:58
16.	"Knock Knock"	0:51
17.	"Let Me In"	1:43
18.	"Maximum Effort"	1:38
19.	"The Orphanage"	2:57
20.	"Cable Flashback"	1:23
21.	"Genuine High Grade Lead"	1:53
22.	"Courage Mother F*****"	1:27

==== Vinyl release ====
All music composed by Tyler Bates:

Side A
No.	Title	Length
1.	"X-Men Arrive"	0:58
2.	"Fighting Dirty"	2:03
3.	"Hello Super Powers"	0:57
4.	"Escape"	2:13
5.	"Vanessa"	1:55
6.	"Weasel Interrogation"	1:11
7.	"Holy S*** Balls"	1:32
8.	"Mutant Convoy"	3:59
9.	"The Name is Cable"	1:23
10.	"Sorry for Your Loss"	1:01
11.	"You Can’t Stop this Mother F*****"	1:10

Side B
No.	Title	Length
12.	"Ice Box"	1:19
13.	"Docking"	1:16
14.	"Make the Whole World our B****"	3:15
15.	"Pity D***"	0:58
16.	"Knock Knock"	0:51
17.	"Let Me In"	1:43
18.	"Maximum Effort"	1:38
19.	"The Orphanage"	2:57
20.	"Cable Flashback"	1:23
21.	"Genuine High Grade Lead"	1:53
22.	"Courage Mother F*****"	1:27

=== Deadpool 2 (Original Motion Picture Soundtrack) ===
A soundtrack album compiling the songs from the film, including the previously released singles "Ashes" and "Welcome to the Party", as well as a cue from Bates' score was released by Columbia Records, Fox Music and Sony Music on May 18, 2018, coinciding with the film's release.

No.	Title	Writer(s)	Producer(s)	Length
1.	"Ashes" (Céline Dion)	Petey Martin; Jordan Smith; Tedd T	Steve Mac	3:19
2.	"Welcome to the Party" (Diplo, French Montana and Lil Pump featuring Zhavia Ward)	Thomas Wesley Pentz; Valentino Khan; Karim Kharbouch; Jocelyn Donald; Gazzy Garcia	Diplo; Valentino Khan	3:01
3.	"Nobody Speak" (DJ Shadow featuring Run The Jewels)	Josh Davis; Jaime Meline; Michael Render	DJ Shadow	3:16
4.	"In Your Eyes" (Peter Gabriel)	Gabriel	Gabriel; Bill Laswell; Daniel Lanois	5:29
5.	"Take On Me" (MTV Unplugged – Summer Solstice) (a-ha)	Pål Waaktaar; Morten Harket; Magne Furuholmen	Lars Horntveth; A-ha; Martin Terefe	4:14
6.	"If I Could Turn Back Time" (Cher)	Diane Warren	Warren; Guy Roche	4:01
7.	"9 to 5" (Dolly Parton)	Parton	Gregg Perry	2:45
8.	"All Out of Love" (Air Supply)	Graham Russell; Clive Davis	Robie Porter	4:03
9.	"We Belong" (Pat Benatar)	Daniel Navarro; David Eric Lowen	Neil Giraldo; Peter Coleman	3:42
10.	"Tomorrow" (Alicia Morton)	Charles Strouse; Martin Charnin		2:30
11.	"Mutant Convoy" (Tyler Bates)	Bates	Bates	3:59
12.	"Bangarang" (Skrillex featuring Sirah)	Sonny Moore; Sara Mitchell	Skrillex	3:35

=== Deadpool 2 (Original Motion Picture Soundtrack) [Deluxe – Super Duper Cut] ===
A soundtrack album covering all of the songs previously released in the soundtrack album, including "Ashes" and the cue from Bates' score, and adding six tracks including songs heard only in the extended cut of the film was released by Columbia Records on August 10, 2018, ahead of the extended cut's release on August 21.

No.	Title	Writer(s)	Producer(s)	Length
1.	"Ashes" (performed by Celine Dion)	Petey Martin; Jordan Smith; Tedd T	Steve Mac	3:19
2.	"Welcome to the Party" (Diplo, French Montana and Lil Pump featuring Zhavia Ward)	Thomas Wesley Pentz; Karim Kharbouch; Gazzy Garcia; Valentino Khan; Jocelyn Donald	Diplo; Valentino Khan	3:01
3.	"You Can’t Stop this Mother F***** (Choir Only Mix)" (Tyler Bates)	Tyler Bates	Tyler Bates	1:10
4.	"Deadpool Rap (X-Force Remix)" (Teamheadkick)	Teamheadkick	Teamheadkick	2:20
5.	"Nobody Speak" (DJ Shadow featuring Run the Jewels)	Josh Davis; Jaime Meline; Michael Render	DJ Shadow	3:16
6.	"In Your Eyes" (Peter Gabriel)	Peter Gabriel	Peter Gabriel; Bill Laswell; Daniel Lanois	5:29
7.	"Take On Me" (MTV Unplugged – Summer Solstice) (A-Ha)	Magne Furuholmen; Morten Harket; Pål Waaktaar	Lars Horntveth; A-ha; Martin Terefe	4:14
8.	"If I Could Turn Back Time" (Cher)	Diane Warren	Diane Warren; Guy Roche	4:01
9.	"9 to 5" (Dolly Parton)	Dolly Parton	Gregg Perry	2:45
10.	"All Out of Love" (Air Supply)	Clive Davis; Graham Russell	Robie Porter	4:03
11.	"We Belong" (Pat Benatar)	David Eric Lowen; Dan Navarro	Neil Giraldo; Peter Coleman	3:42
12.	"Tomorrow" (Alicia Morton)	Charles Strouse; Martin Charnin		2:30
13.	"Mutant Convoy" (Tyler Bates)	Tyler Bates	Tyler Bates	3:59
14.	"Bangarang" (Skrillex featuring Sirah)	Sonny Moore	Skrillex	3:35
15.	"Ashes" (Jordan Smith)	Petey Martin; Jordan Smith; Tedd T	Steve Mac	3:11
16.	"Love Hurts" (The Osborne Brothers)	Boudleaux Bryant		2:51
17.	"Fight Dirty" (Guignol and Mischief Brew)	Erik Petersen; Guignol		4:02
18.	"Fly Like an Eagle" (Steve Miller Band)	Steve Miller	Steve Miller	4:42

== Reception ==
=== Charts ===
Deadpool 2 (Original Motion Picture Soundtrack) debuted on the US Billboard 200 chart at number 18, surpassing the peak of the first Deadpool film soundtrack (number 30 in 2016). It also peaked at number 3 on the soundtrack albums charts in the United States and the United Kingdom. In Australia, Deadpool 2 (Original Motion Picture Soundtrack) reached number 9 on the ARIA Top 100 Albums Chart.

Chart (2018)	Peak position
Australian Albums (ARIA)	9
Austrian Albums (Ö3 Austria)	29
Belgian Albums (Ultratop Wallonia)	133
Canadian Albums (Billboard)	16
Czech Albums (ČNS IFPI)	44
German Albums (Offizielle Top 100)	68
Irish Compilation Albums (IRMA)	2
Japanese Albums (Billboard Japan)	57
Japanese Albums (Oricon)	65
Japanese International Albums (Oricon)	12
New Zealand Heatseeker Albums (RMNZ)	3
South Korean Albums (Circle)	44
South Korean International Albums (Circle)	2
Swiss Albums (Schweizer Hitparade)	29
Taiwanese Western Albums (5-Music)	2
UK Soundtrack Albums (Official Charts)	3
US Billboard 200	18
US Soundtrack Albums (Billboard)	3

=== Critical response ===
Writing for ..Movie Music UK.., Jonathan Broxton praised Bates' score as a "blast", describing it as "like night and day" compared to Junkie XL's score for the first film which Broxton felt had "failed on every conceivable level". He specifically called the use of choir "hilarious and brilliant", and the main theme of the score "outstanding", considering it to be better than the thematic work done by many of the other composers who have worked on the X-Men franchise. He concluded that Bates "fully understood the needs of this film and delivered exactly what was required, but remembered to imbue it with a great deal of personality". On the soundtrack, Broxton was positive about the songs chosen for the film, and particularly praised "Ashes" as both "hilarious" and a genuine contender for the Academy Award for Best Original Song.

Mikey Mason praised Bates' score as "upbeat, energetic and fun" when reviewing the soundtrack for We Are Geeks of Color, highlighting the tracks "Mutant Convoy" and "You Can't Stop This Motherf*****". He felt each song chosen for the film was used perfectly, especially "Ashes" which he felt "makes total, genius sense in context" and was able to balance humor with heartbreak. Chuck Campbell of Knoxville News gave the soundtrack album three out of five, calling it an "ultimately disposable" compilation that is still "fun in the moment". Campbell praised "Ashes" for its earnest effect, but felt the main positive of the soundtrack was its "campy collection of decades-old hits". An editor's note on the iTunes website described the score as "that rarest of treats: an actually funny action-film soundtrack".

== Accolades ==
Deadpool 2 (Original Motion Picture Soundtrack) was nominated for the Grammy Award for Best Compilation Soundtrack for Visual Media at the 61st Annual Grammy Awards but lost to The Greatest Showman (soundtrack).
