= CD Rev =

Chinese government-sponsored gangsta rap group

- Also known as: Chengdu Revolution
- Origin: Chengdu, Sichuan, China
- Years active: 2016–present
- Members: Wang "Chuckie" Zixin (王梓鑫); Li "Pissy" Yijie (李毅傑); Tan "N.O.G." Yunwen (譚鈞文); Luo "Roy" Jinhui (羅錦輝)

CD Rev, also known as Chengdu Revolution or 天府事变 (tiān fǔ shìbiàn), is a Chinese Communist Party-sponsored gangsta rap group whose nationalist-themed music has been described in the West as propaganda. The group's music videos have been viewed online millions of times partly due to the support of state media in China and widely discussed in Western media.

== Background ==
CD Rev is one of several nationalist media projects sponsored by technology entrepreneur and April Media founder Rao Jin. The four members (Wang Zixin, Li Yijie, Tan Yunwen and Luo Jinhui) are from the south-western Chinese city of Chengdu, a city with an emergent American-style rap scene.

The group's official biography claims it was founded on October 1, 2015, the anniversary of the foundation of the People's Republic of China. They claim to draw inspiration from American hip-hop artists such as Eminem and Dr. Dre, while stating that their music is a modernization of traditional Chinese patriotic education.

== Music ==
CD Rev have released a number of singles, frequently accompanied by music videos, on topics ranging from China's disputed territorial claims in the South China Sea to the legacy of Mao Zedong.

The group's first single, "The Force of Red", appeared in January 2016. The song, performed in English, espouses pro-One China sentiments and attacks Taiwan president Tsai Ing-wen, describes Western journalists as "media punk ass white trash fuckers", and declares that "the red king's coming back". Group member Wang Zixin later called these lyrics "a little extreme".

In June 2016, CD Rev released a single sponsored by the Communist Youth League, a government-backed Communist youth movement. The song, called "This is China", was also performed in English, as it was aimed at Westerners with the intent of changing their perceptions of China. The song's lyrics trumpet Chinese achievements such as the work of Nobel Prize-winning chemist Tu Youyou and the ancient philosopher Confucius. "This is China" acknowledges many of China's problems, including air pollution and political corruption but also suggests that these problems have been exaggerated by foreign media. The song was characterized as "cringe-worthy" and "wooden". Social media users noted that the music video for "This is China" was very similar to an earlier video from South Korean rapper San E, and the video has since been removed due to copyright claims from San E's production company, Brand New Music.

CD Rev released the song "No THAAD" in May 2017, again sponsored by the Communist Youth League. Performed in a mixture of English and Chinese, "No THAAD" criticizes the South Korean government of Park Geun-hye for authorizing the installation of the American THAAD missile defense system, which the Chinese government had objected to. The song's lyrics refer to South Korea as China's "little brother" and warn that "[the] things you're doing now are gonna rip you apart".

In December 2018, CD Rev released "F*** Lil Pump", a diss track against American rapper Lil Pump. That month, Lil Pump had previewed Butterfly Doors, a song containing anti-Asian lyrics such as "ching chong" and "they call me Yao Ming cause my eyes real low".

On 15 April 2020, CD Rev released a single named “Mr. Virus”, sponsored by the Communist Youth League.

The content of the song includes:

1. Expressing support for Tedros Adhanom Ghebreyesus, who is the Director-General of the World Health Organization.
2. Laughing and insulting Taiwan.
3. Laughing at Western politicians and the media.

These three points are also the most important propaganda views of the Chinese Communist Party after the COVID-19 pandemic. CD Rev sang the propaganda views of the Chinese Communist Party in the form of hip-hop rap. People's Daily, Ziguang Pavilion, and the Communist Youth League jointly praised the song.

== See also ==
- Chinese hip hop
- Revolutionary opera
- Propaganda in the People's Republic of China
