= Pump Rock x Heavy Metal =

2023 song by Lil Pump

Song by Lil Pump

from the album Lil Pump 2
- Released: March 17, 2023
- Recorded: 2023
- Genre: Rap metal
- Length: 2:57
- Label: The Lights Global; Warner
- Songwriters: Gazzy Garcia; Christopher Barnett; Brenden Murray
- Producers: CBMix; Bighead

"Pump Rock x Heavy Metal" is a song by American rapper Lil Pump, released on March 17, 2023, as part of his third studio album Lil Pump 2. The track drew attention for its stylistic departure from Pump's usual trap-oriented sound.

== Background and internet reaction ==
The song prompted widespread discussion on Twitter and TikTok, with reactions largely negative, although some users expressed amusement or enjoyment of its punk-influenced energy. Ultimate Guitar noted that the song was widely criticized in YouTube comments, including one highly rated post stating, "no mixing, no autotune, just straight ass."

== Composition and lyrics ==
Critics described the song as a rap-metal track, incorporating rock music with metal elements and screamed vocals, and attempts to emulate heavy metal aesthetics. The lyrics reference luxury cars, reckless behavior, and sexual boasting. The song begins with a driving, hardcore punk-influenced section before shifting into a rap passage in which Lil Pump repeatedly shouts "This that heavy metal shit". The overall production then changes and includes exaggerated lyrical references to self-harm.

== Critical reception ==
The song received a more hesitant or cautious response from listeners and critics. It was criticized by some reviewers and cited as one of the weaker moments on the album. Critics described the track as a poorly executed rap-metal crossover, with some outlets labeling it among the worst metal songs of 2023. Clash Music said that the new elements on Lil Pump 2, including this song with its thundering guitar chords, did not really work for him and made the album feel out of place.

== Personnel ==
- Gazzy Garcia – vocals, songwriter
- Christopher Barnett – songwriter
- Brenden Murray – songwriter, producer
- CBMix – producer
