= Lil Pump 2 =

Studio album by Lil Pump
- Released: March 17, 2023
- Recorded: 2019–2023
- Genre: Hip-hop; trap; SoundCloud rap
- Length: 41:06
- Producer: Carnage; Bighead; Fizzle; DSC Sunny; Ronny J; Bridgez; Roark; Ponzoo; Dejuan Cross; Babybloo; Broken Clouds; Gnealz; Danny Wolf

Lil Pump chronology
No Name (2021)	Lil Pump 2 (2023)

Singles from Lil Pump 2
- 1. "All the Sudden" Released: April 12, 2022; 2. "Splurgin" Released: July 20, 2022; 3. "Mosh Pit" Released: September 27, 2022; 4. "She Know" Released: December 7, 2022; 5. "Tesla" Released: February 24, 2023; 6. "I Sell" Released: August 17, 2023; 7. "6 Rings" Released: September 1, 2023; 8. "Glow in the Dark" Released: September 8, 2023

Lil Pump 2 is the third studio album by American rapper Lil Pump. It was released through Repost Network on March 17, 2023, serves as the sequel to his self-titled debut studio album (2017). Work on the album commenced in mid-2019 and concluded in 2023. The album consists of 16 tracks and features guest appearances from Smokepurpp, YoungBoy Never Broke Again, Ty Dolla Sign, Rio Da Yung Og and G4 Boyz. The album was executive produced by CBMix. Production was also handled by Bighead, Carnage, Ronny J, among others. The album serves as the follow-up to Pump's second studio album, Harverd Dropout (2019), as well as No Name (2021), his mixtape with Ronny J.

It was supported by five singles – "All the Sudden", "Splurgin", "Mosh Pit", "She Know", and "Tesla". The deluxe version of the album was released on September 15, 2023. Lil Pump 2 received mixed reviews and failed to land on any chart and was projected to earn significantly less album-equivalent units in its first week than his previous album, Harverd Dropout.

== Background and release ==
Lil Pump released his eponymous debut album in October 2017, which marked his official transition from being a SoundCloud rapper to being in the mainstream eye. Its sequel was announced in 2019 but was delayed in favor of a collaborative album with Ronny J titled No Name, which was quietly released on December 10, 2021, to no fanfare. It was later announced that the project was slated for release in August 2022, but was delayed because Garcia claimed to have lost the hard drive containing the album in a lake.

In August 2022, during an interview with Inked Magazine, Lil Pump originally confirmed that it would be dropping that same month, however, that ended up not being the case.

On March 10, 2023, Lil Pump took to Instagram to reveal the album's cover art and tracklist, with features ranging from YoungBoy Never Broke Again, Rio Da Yung Og, the previously mentioned Smokepurpp, Ty Dolla Sign, and G4 Boyz.

== Singles and promotion ==
Pump released the album's lead single, "All the Sudden", on April 12, 2022. It was followed by the second single, "Splurgin", which was released on July 20, 2022. The third single, "Mosh Pit", was released on September 27, 2022. "She Know" featuring Ty Dolla Sign was released as the fourth on December 7, 2022. "Tesla" with Smokepurpp was released as fifth and final single for the album, being released February 24, 2023. Pump also smashed a brand new Ferrari windshield to promote the project.

== Artwork ==
On March 11, 2023, Pump announced the cover art for Lil Pump 2 via social media. The cover portrays more of a rock/punk theme to it. It shows Pump shaking his head, with his hair spelling "LP2".

== Critical reception ==
Professional ratings
Review scores
Source	Rating
Clash	6/10
HipHopDX	2.4/5
Pitchfork	4.4/10
RapReviews	2/10

Reviewing the album for Clash, Robin Murray stated "'Lil Pump 2 is all glitz and fireworks, while never truly leading from the front. Tapping back into his core values, it's a fan pleaser, but ultimately finds Lil Pump staying still. Aylor Rubright from HipHopDX stated: "On Lil Pump 2. His best work tends to be energetic, zany, and a bit funny, but Lil Pump 2 is rarely able to strike a meaningful balance between these three aspects. Whereas his older music was able to capture those characteristics in a way that felt organic, it now feels like he's simply going through the motions without any sort of chemistry between artists, producers, and engineers naturally taking the reins in a studio session."

"Pump Rock x Heavy Metal", a rap metal and nu metal song, was panned by numerous heavy metal publications and by people online. Metal Hammer's Liz Scarlett described the song as "so bad in fact, that it makes us want to have a little cry", writing, "Lil Pump has somehow absorbed every single cliché in the alternative scene and bundled them all together in a NSFW song that would make your mother very, very upset." Metal Injection compared the song unfavourably to other hip-hop inspired metal acts (and vice versa), including Ho99o9, Ghostmane, Tallah, Tetrarch, and Wargasm. MetalSucks called it the "worst metal song of the year", comparing the song unfavourably to T-Pain's cover of "War Pigs" by Black Sabbath.

== Track listing ==
Lil Pump 2 track listing
No.	Title	Writer(s)	Producer(s)	Length
1.	"Tesla" (with Smokepurpp)	Gazzy Garcia; Omar Pineiro; Jaylier Pineiro; Theo Von	DSC Sunny	2:14
2.	"Pull Up"	Garcia; Christopher Barnett	CBMix	2:58
3.	"Ain't With That"	Garcia; Diamante Blackmon	Carnage	1:32
4.	"All the Sudden"	Garcia; Barnett	CBMix	2:03
5.	"I Don't Mind" (featuring YoungBoy Never Broke Again)	Garcia; Josh Goldenberg; Kentrell Gaulden	Fizzle	2:51
6.	"No Hook" (with Rio Da Yung Og)	Garcia; Barnett; Da'mario Donshay Horne-McCullough	CBMix	4:26
7.	"Pump Rock x Heavy Metal"	Garcia; Barnett; Brenden Murray	CBMix; Bighead	2:57
8.	"Till I See You" (with Smokepurpp)	Garcia; O. Pineiro; J. Pineiro	DSC Sunny	1:43
9.	"She Know" (featuring Ty Dolla Sign)	Garcia; Brandon Hesson; Dejuan Cross; Eric Bellinger; Gilbert Baba; Kendall Bailey; Nelson Bridges; Tyrone Griffin, Jr.; Vurdell Muller	Bridgez; Roark; Ponzoo; Cross	2:35
10.	"Don't Like Me"	Garcia; Goldenberg	Fizzle	4:23
11.	"Fendi on Fendi"	Garcia; Murray	Bighead	2:12
12.	"Mosh Pit"	Garcia; Barnet	CBMix	1:56
13.	"Move It"	Garcia; Ronald Spence Jr.	Ronny J	2:11
14.	"Wok"	Garcia; Barnett	CBMix	2:04
15.	"Splurgin"	Garcia; Barnett	CBMix	2:07
16.	"Swipe" (with G4 Boyz)	Garcia; Murray; Barnett; Gabriel Adesanya; Kevin Adesanya	Bighead; CBMix	2:54
Total length:				41:06

Deluxe edition (bonus tracks)
No.	Title	Writer(s)	Producer(s)	Length
17.	"6 Rings"	Garcia; Danny Wolf	Danny Wolf	2:00
18.	"I Sell"	Garcia; Barnett	CBMix	2:47
19.	"Glow in the Dark"	Garcia; Babybloo; Broken Clouds	Babybloo; Broken Clouds	1:56
20.	"Rick Rubin"	Garcia; Gerrell Nealy	Gnealz	2:02
Total length:				48:01
