= Drop Out (song) =

Song by Lil Pump

from the album Harverd Dropout
- Released: February 22, 2019
- Length: 2:01
- Label: Tha Lights Global; Warner Bros.
- Songwriters: Gazzy Garcia; Sebastian Baldeon
- Producer: Diablo

"Drop Out" is a song by American rapper Lil Pump from his second studio album Harverd Dropout (2019). The song stands as the first track on the album. It was produced by Diablo and sees Lil Pump claiming to be a free agent. The song received mixed to positive reviews from music critics.

== Background ==
In August 2017, Lil Pump took to Twitter and claimed that he really did drop out of Harvard so he could save the rap game and Lil Pump went on to release "Drop Out" as the first song on his album Harverd Dropout on February 22, 2019. Despite doing so, Lil Pump encouraged others not to drop out themselves on March 1, 2019.

== Song ==
The song was produced by Diablo. In it, Lil Pump claims to be a free agent after his issues with Warner Bros. Records, though he was signed to the label at the time of the album's release. Lil Pump shared a video clip of him dancing to part of the audio via Instagram on February 24, 2019, two days after the album had been released.

== Reception ==
The song was met with mixed to positive reviews from music critics. It was listed by Craig Jenkins of Vulture as being one of the examples of where "charisma that puts tracks [on Harverd Dropout] over the top doesn't always stick". Alphonse Pierre of Pitchfork described to the song as where "Pump doubles down on his vendetta against adults". Brody Kenny of The 405 viewed the song's place as the album's opening track as what "sets the stage pretty well".

== Commercial performance ==
Despite not being released as a single, "Drop Out" managed to chart at number 30 on the New Zealand Hot Singles chart upon the release of Harverd Dropout.

== Charts ==
Chart (2019)	Peak position
New Zealand Hot Singles (RMNZ)	30
