= Kept Back =

Single by Gucci Mane featuring Lil Pump

from the album Evil Genius (bonus track)
- Released: August 3, 2018 (solo version); August 9, 2018 (featuring Lil Pump)
- Genre: Hip hop
- Length: 2:57 (featuring Lil Pump); 2:49 (solo version)
- Label: Atlantic; WEA
- Songwriters: Radric Davis; Gazzy Garcia; Shane Lindstrom
- Producer: Murda Beatz

Gucci Mane singles chronology
"Pineapple" (2018)	"Kept Back" (2018)	"Wake Up in the Sky" (2018)

Lil Pump singles chronology
"Drug Addicts" (2018)	"Kept Back" (2018)	"I Love It" (2018)

"Kept Back" is a song by American rapper Gucci Mane featuring fellow American rapper Lil Pump. Written alongside producer Murda Beatz, it was released on August 9, 2018 via Atlantic Records and WEA as the second single and sole bonus track on Mane's twelfth studio album, Evil Genius. Mane and Pump previously collaborated on Pump's track, "Youngest Flexer", from his self-titled debut studio album, which was released on October 6, 2017.

== Background ==
It was released as the second single from Mane's thirteenth studio album, Evil Genius. Speaking about collaborating with Pump for the song, Mane stated that "I’m a big fan of Pump. I think he be flowing," praising the new generation of mumble rappers by saying "They make good music so I wanted to collab with them. They’re dope." HotNewHipHop noted the song as "forging the synthesis between Gucci Mane's ironclad image and a new rap frontier led by Pump and rappers of the like." Rolling Stone described the song as "a recorder worthy of a renaissance fair drifts lazily through the song, coasting on top of a crushing bass line," while noting Mane's rap style of a "straightforward monotone" with references to musicians such as Bono, Cher and Nelly Furtado, The Simpsons' character Marge Simpson and basketball player Ben Simmons. Lil Pump performs a verse in the song which is described as a “bracing addition”.

== Music video ==
The official music video, filmed in Miami Beach, features Mane and Pump as "rockstars" in a yacht party, where they are seen with bikini-wearing guests with Mane exiting via a Rolls-Royce and Pump riding a jet ski before him. It was released on October 17, 2018, which was the first anniversary of Mane's wedding with Jamaican model Keyshia Ka'oir. The wedding was held on October 17, 2017.
