= Be Like Me =

2019 single by Lil Pump featuring Lil Wayne

Single by Lil Pump featuring Lil Wayne

from the album Harverd Dropout
- Released: February 21, 2019
- Length: 4:01
- Label: Tha Lights Global; Warner
- Songwriters: Gazzy Garcia; Dwayne Carter, Jr.; Christopher Barnett
- Producer: CBMix

Lil Pump singles chronology
"Racks on Racks" (2019)	"Be Like Me" (2019)	"Pose To Do" (2019)

Lil Wayne singles chronology
"I Don't Even Know You Anymore" (2019)	"Be Like Me" (2019)	"Pullin'" (2019)

Music video
- "Be Like Me" on YouTube

"Be Like Me" is a song by American rapper Lil Pump featuring fellow American rapper Lil Wayne from the former's second studio album, Harverd Dropout (2019). It was released for digital download and streaming as the album's seventh single on February 21, 2019 by Tha Lights Global and Warner Records. Written alongside producer CBMix, the song sees Lil Pump calling out the rappers copying his style while Lil Wayne looks at how he birthed a generation of them.

"Be Like Me" was mostly praised by music critics, with some seeing it among the best tracks on Harverd Dropout. An accompanying music video for the song was released on the same day. Directed by Sophie Muller, the visual is reminiscent of the video for Eminem's "The Real Slim Shady" (2000) and sees Lil Pump leading an army of people that want to be like him. The song charted in the United States, Ireland, New Zealand, and Canada. For promotion, Lil Pump performed it on Jimmy Kimmel Live! in February 2019.

== Background and composition ==
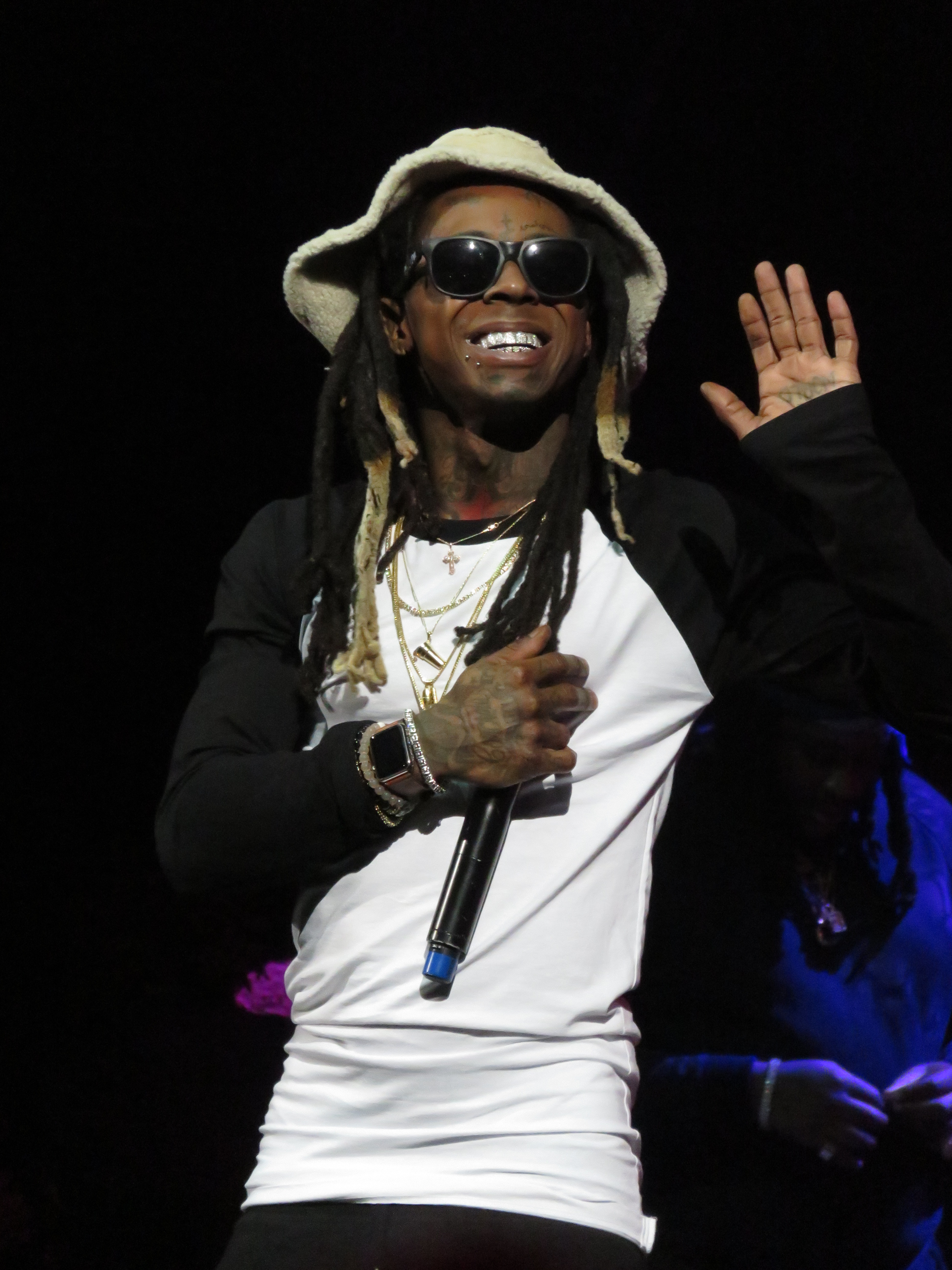
The song includes a verse from Lil Wayne, pictured in December 2015.

The involvement of Lil Wayne was first known to the public when Lil Pump shared a photo of the Harverd Dropout's tracklist that revealed him as being featured on "Be Like Me". He stands alongside the likes of 2 Chainz, Lil Uzi Vert and Quavo as one of the fellow rap artists to be featured on the album. The song was produced by CBMix, standing as one of the four tracks on Harverd Dropout that was solely produced by him. Lil Pump, CBMix and Lil Wayne wrote the song.

"Be Like Me" has a "bouncy" instrumental minimalistic in its arrangement. Lyrically, Lil Pump calls out those copying his style in hip hop, rapping lines such as: "Everybody wanna be like Pump / Everybody got fake dreads and love to take drugs." Pump references Kanye West, whom he collaborated with on "I Love It" (2018), with the lyrics: "Everybody wanna be like Ye / Everybody wanna go and smash Kim K." Utilizing Lil Pump's flow during his verse at the end of the track, Lil Wayne looks at how he birthed the next generation of rappers.

== Release and reception ==
The song was released for digital download in the United States on the eve of the album's release as its seventh single. That same day, it was also made available for streaming. "Be Like Me" is the twelfth track on Lil Pump's second studio album Harverd Dropout, released on February 22, 2019.

The song received generally positive reviews from music critics. It was viewed by Luke Morgan Britton of NME as being one of "the rare moments where things do click on Harverd Dropout." The staff of Rap-Up called the song a "CB MIX-produced banger." Alphonse Pierre of Pitchfork pointed out "unleashing Pump's purest pop form" on the song as being an example of when the album's "high-budget production does have some bright spots." In a more negative review, Brody Kenny of The 405 labelled the song as "a pretty underwhelming track."

== Music video and promotion ==
An accompanying music video for "Be Like Me" was released on February 22, 2019 and directed by Sophie Muller. The theme of the video is the same as Eminem's visual for "The Real Slim Shady" (2000); Lil Pump hinted at this when tweeting a screenshot reading "IM THE REAL SLIM SHADY". Eminem criticized Pump in his 2018 track "The Ringer", with the latter responding to the diss with "Thank you I deserved that." It is a fluorescent visual that includes Lil Pump leading an army of look-alikes and imposters that want to be like him. Lil Wayne's cameo sees him with a Styrofoam cup and blunt in hand while rapping or being reflected in multiple mirrors.

For further promotion, Lil Pump performed "Be Like Me" on Jimmy Kimmel Live! on February 25, 2019. The performance began with him breaking a banner and confetti raining afterwards. Pump dressed in a way that resembled the cover art of Harverd Dropout, wearing a decked-out purple and white graduation robe, with a bedazzled cap on his head. During the performance, Lil Pump was backed by an all-purple drumline and cheerleaders.

== Commercial performance ==
Upon its release as a single, "Be Like Me" debuted at number 72 on the US Billboard Hot 100 and number 35 on the US Hot R&B/Hip-Hop Songs charts respectively. The track descended 14 places to number 49 on the Hot R&B/Hip-Hop Songs chart the next week. On the Irish Singles Chart, it entered at number 71. The track further charted at number 47 on the Canadian Hot 100.

The song became Lil Pump's final charting single on the Billboard Hot 100.

== Credits and personnel ==
Credits adapted from Tidal.

- Lil Pump – performer, lyricist, composer
- Lil Wayne – performer, lyricist, composer
- CBMix – lyricist, composer, mixing, mastering, recording

== Charts ==
Chart (2019)	Peak position
Canada Hot 100 (Billboard)	47
Ireland (IRMA)	71
New Zealand Hot Singles (RMNZ)	9
US Billboard Hot 100	72
US Hot R&B/Hip-Hop Songs (Billboard)	33
US Rhythmic Airplay (Billboard)	19

== Release history ==
Region	Date	Format	Label	Ref.
United States	February 21, 2019	Digital download	Tha Lights Global; Warner	
Various	February 21, 2019	Streaming	Tha Lights Global; Warner	
