= Racks on Racks =

2019 single by Lil Pump

Single by Lil Pump

from the album Harverd Dropout
- Released: January 31, 2019
- Length: 2:09
- Label: Tha Lights Global; Warner
- Songwriters: Gazzy Garcia; Sebastian Baldeon
- Producers: Diablo; Diamond Pistols

Lil Pump singles chronology
"Butterfly Doors" (2019)	"Racks on Racks" (2019)	"Be Like Me" (2019)

Music video
- "Racks on Racks" on YouTube

"Racks on Racks" is a song by American rapper Lil Pump. The song is from his second studio album Harverd Dropout (2019). It was produced by Diablo and Diamond Pistols.

== Background ==
On October 21, 2018, Pump revealed the song on Instagram by sharing a video of its snippet. He was seen moving his head in the video while wearing a chain. The post was captioned with "RACKS ON RACKS I'm back on my old shit bitchhhhh 500k comments I'll drop it now." The song lyrically discusses Pump having a lot of money. The song was premiered by Zane Lowe on Beats 1, and will be included in Pump's Harverd Dropout debut album. Uproxx compared the song to Pump's 2017 single "Gucci Gang", noting its similarity of having a "choppy, staccato flow that first made him a household name."

== Music video ==
The official music video for the song, directed by Brthr, was released on January 31, 2019. It features Pump "jet ski-stunting with monster trucks and airplanes while bragging about his money and women", in a desert which eventually advances to scenes featuring "Twisted Metal-inspired animation" with Pump "driving his monster truck through a colourful mass of flaming wreckage." Consequence of Sound described the video, stating "it’s like a very bad, Hollywood ensemble action film, except the only star you’re getting is Lil Pump, which is… well, disappointing is an understatement." Highsnobiety described it as "evoking a Mad Max-inspired setting with a Gucci-clad Pump partying it up in a desert, surrounded by video vixens wielding flame cannons and other weaponry."

== Charts ==
Chart (2019)	Peak position
Belgium (Ultratip Bubbling Under Flanders)	34
Canada Hot 100 (Billboard)	77
Czech Republic Singles Digital (ČNS IFPI)	62
France (SNEP)	155
Ireland (IRMA)	89
Lithuania (AGATA)	65
New Zealand Hot Singles (RMNZ)	5
Slovakia Singles Digital (ČNS IFPI)	39
Sweden Heatseeker (Sverigetopplistan)	8
Switzerland (Schweizer Hitparade)	68
US Bubbling Under Hot 100 (Billboard)	2
US Hot R&B/Hip-Hop Songs (Billboard)	46
