= Valentino Khan =

American DJ and music producer

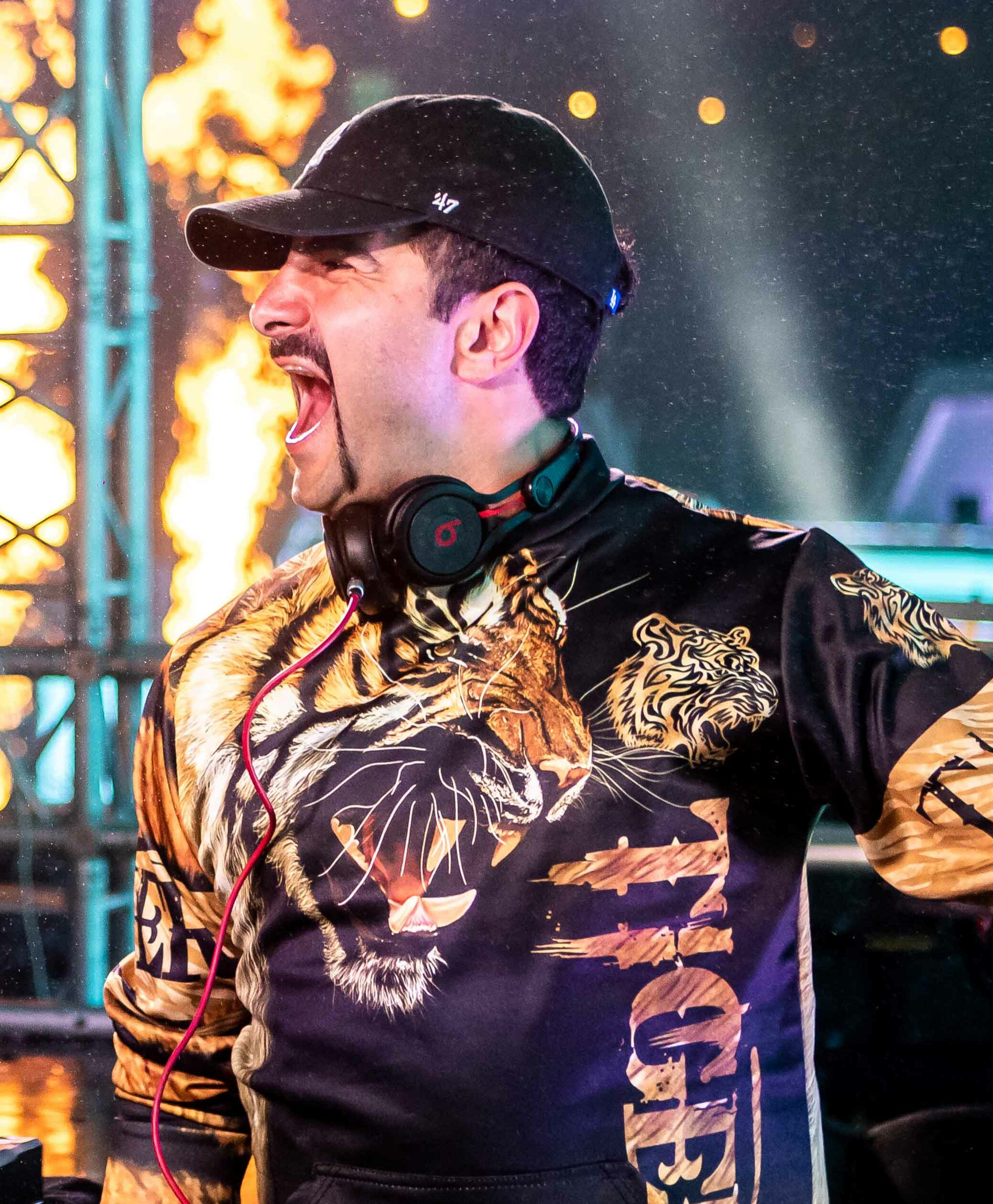
- Valentino Khan at S2O Thailand 2023

Background information
- Born: Valentino Khan; February 15, 1987 (age 39); Los Angeles, California, U.S.
- Origin: Los Angeles, California, U.S.
- Genres: Trap; hardstyle; moombahton; future house; dubstep; jungle terror; bass house
- Occupations: Record producer; DJ; musician
- Instrument: Digital audio workstation
- Years active: 2012–present
- Labels: Mad Decent; Owsla; Ministry of Sound; Spinnin' Records

Valentino Khan (born February 15, 1987) is an American DJ and producer born and raised in Los Angeles. He is best known for releasing material through Diplo, Skrillex and Steve Aoki. His singles "Deep Down Low" and "Make Some Noise" peaked at number one and fifty respectively on the "Billboard Twitter Emerging Artists" chart.

== Career ==
=== 2012: Beginnings ===
He started his career as a hip-hop producer making music for artists like T.I., 2 Chainz and B.o.B.

In 2012, some of his remixes were released officially. Most notably, his remix of Gent & Jawns' song "Holler" which was released through Diplo's record label Mad Decent. He collaborated with Will Bailey for a song, "Rukus" and produced B.o.B.'s single "Play For Keeps" from the album Strange Clouds. He also co-produced Major Lazer's 2013 single "Bubble Butt". Musically, he is trap-oriented.

=== 2013: Homage ===
On June 5, 2013, he released a song "Fahrenheit" for free as homage to old school electro.

=== 2014: In Khan We Trust ===
His debut extended play, In Khan We Trust was released on July 22, 2014, via Owsla, featuring its first single "Make Some Noise".

=== 2015: "Deep Down Low" ===
On April 20, 2015, Khan collaborated with Flosstradamus to release "MFU" as a single. On August 11, 2015, "Deep Down Low" was released as a single. It featured on OWSLA's Spring Compilation album and was described as a genre pioneer. The song was regarded the 'most popular song among DJs' in 2015 and was featured in Tomorrowland's 2015 compilation album titled The Secret Kingdom Of Melodia. Musically, the song incorporates elements of big room house and jungle terror and is often considered "hard house". A music video for the song was released. A remixes extended play of the song was released.

=== 2016: "Tropicana" and "Slam Dunk" ===
He collaborated with Wiwek to release the song "Tropicana". On July 29, 2016, he collaborated with Skrillex to release the song "Slam Dunk". It featured vocalist Kstylis. He recognized Rihanna and Sia as his preferred female collaboration choices. Both tracks were released on OWSLA.

=== 2017: "Bullseye", "Pump" and "Gold" ===
On April 7, 2017, he later collaborated with Anna Lunoe and Wuki for the single "Bullseye" via Skrillex's record label OWSLA. On May 26, 2017, Khan released "Pump" as a single via Mad Decent and Ministry of Sound which gained widespread popularity due recurring ads on social media platforms of the game Mafia City that samples this track. On October 20, 2017, Khan released "Gold" on OWSLA.

=== 2021 ===
On August 21, 2021, Khan was the first DJ to perform at the WWE pay per view, SummerSlam

=== 2022 ===
Khan is also the first DJ to perform at the WWE premium live event WrestleMania 38. He will perform on both nights, April 2–3.

== Discography ==
=== Extended plays ===
List of extended plays
Title	Details
House Party	Released: 9 August 2019; Label: Mad Decent; Formats: Digital download
French Fried	Released: 21 October 2020; Label: Mad Decent; Formats: Digital download

=== Charted singles ===
Title	Year	Peak chart positions
Title	Year	BEL
"Deep Down Low"	2015	69

=== Singles ===
2017

- "Gold" (with Sean Paul)

2018

- "Feel Your Love" [Mad Decent]
- "Lick It" [Spinnin` Records]

2019

- "Flip the Switch" (with Chris Lorenzo) [Mad Decent]
- "Better" (with Wuki featuring Roxanna) [Mad Decent]
- "JustYourSoul" (with Diplo) [Mad Decent]
- "Pony" [Mad Decent]
- "Novocaine" (with Kayzo) [Mad Decent]

2020

- "Anything" (with Alison Wonderland) [Mad Decent]
- "Everybodysgonnawannadancewithme" (featuring Sophie Black) [Mad Decent]
- "Division" [Mad Decent]
- "Deathproof" [Mad Decent]
- "Obsession" (with Ship Wrek) [Mad Decent]

2021

- "Your Body" (with Nitti Gritti) [Spinnin' Records]

=== Remixes ===
2012

- Bernard Herrmann – Psycho Theme (Valentino Khan Remix)

2013

- Gesaffelstein – "Control Movement" (Valentino Khan Remix)
- Skylar Grey – "C'Mon Let Me Ride" (Valentino Khan Remix)
- The Bloody Beetroots featuring Paul McCartney & Youth – "Out Of Sight" (Valentino Khan Remix)

2014

- Dog Blood – "Middle Finger Pt. 2" (Valentino Khan Remix)
- Skrillex – "Recess" (Valentino Khan Remix)
- M.I.A. – "YALA" (Bro Safari & Valentino Khan Remix)

2015

- Dillon Francis – "When We Were Young" (Valentino Khan Remix)
- Flosstradamus featuring Waka Flocka Flame and Elliphant – "TTU (Too Turnt Up)" (Valentino Khan Remix)
- Axwell & Ingrosso – "On My Way" (Valentino Khan Remix)
- Zeds Dead – "Hadouken" (Valentino Khan Remix)
- Yellow Claw – "Run Away" (Valentino Khan Remix)

2018

- Calvin Harris and Dua Lipa – "One Kiss" (Valentino Khan Remix)
- Diplo, French Montana and Lil Pump featuring Zhavia Ward – "Welcome to the Party" (Valentino Khan Remix)
- Alison Wonderland – "Good Enough" (Valentino Khan Remix)
- Sean Paul and David Guetta featuring Becky G – "Mad Love" (Valentino Khan Remix)
- RL Grime featuring Anna Lunoe – "Pressure" (Valentino Khan Remix)

2020

- NCT 127 - "Kick It" (Valentino Khan Remix)
- Lele Pons featuring Susan Diaz and Victor Cardenas - "Volar" (Valentino Khan Remix)
- DJ Snake - "Trust Nobody" (Valentino Khan Remix)

2022

- Dillon Francis feat. Aleyna Tilki - Real Love (Valentino Khan Remix)

=== Production credits ===
Title	Year	Peak chart positions			Note
Title	Year	BEL	FRA	NL	Note
"Bubble Butt" (Major Lazer featuring Bruno Mars, Tyga and Mystic)	2013	24	67	65	Co-producer
"Wot U Gonna Do?" (Dizzee Rascal)	2018	-	-	-	-

=== Music videos ===
Title	Year	Artists	Note
"Ritual"	2016	Marshmello, Wrabel	Cameo appearance
