= Nephew (song) =

2018 single by Smokepurpp

Single by Smokepurpp featuring Lil Pump
- Released: July 27, 2018
- Length: 3:12
- Label: Interscope; Alamo
- Songwriters: Omar Jeffery Pineiro; Gazzy Garcia; Chase D Rose
- Producer: ChaseTheMoney

Smokepurpp singles chronology
"Do Not Disturb" (2018)	"Nephew" (2018)	"Remember Me" (2019)

"Nephew" is a song by American rapper Smokepurpp featuring fellow American rapper Lil Pump. It was released on July 27, 2018. The track peaked at number five on the Bubbling Under Hot 100 chart and at number 96 on the Canadian Hot 100.

== Music video ==
The music video for the track was released on August 6, 2018. The video was directed by Millicent Hailes. Lil Pump spoke about the video in an interview with Billboard during the 2018 MTV Video Music Awards, saying the video was "lit", adding, "I was excited. That shit's fire".

== Critical reception ==
The track received generally positive reviews. Kevin Goddard of HotNewHipHop called the track "bass-heavy" and called the track "very hot".

== Dance challenge ==
On August 10, 2018, Smokepurpp and Lil Pump started a dance challenge for the song, which was described by Trevor Smith of HotNewHipHop as "the Macarena performed by someone who can't quite remember how to do the Macarena", calling it "actually the perfect way to move to a Pump and Purpp track".

== Charts ==
Chart (2018)	Peak position
Canada (Canadian Hot 100)	96
US Bubbling Under Hot 100 Singles (Billboard)	5

== Certifications ==
Region	Certification	Certified units/sales
United States (RIAA)	Gold	500,000^{‡}
^{‡} Sales+streaming figures based on certification alone.
