= New Patek =

Single by Lil Uzi Vert
- Released: September 18, 2018
- Recorded: 2018
- Genre: Trap; hip hop
- Length: 5:43
- Label: Atlantic (US); Warner (worldwide)
- Songwriter: Symere Woods
- Producer: Dolan Beats

Lil Uzi Vert singles chronology
| "Wasted" (2018) | "New Patek" (2018) | "Multi Millionaire" (2018) |

"New Patek" is a song written and performed by American rapper Lil Uzi Vert. It was released on September 18, 2018, and produced by Dolan Beats. As the only solo song from Uzi in 2018, it was initially expected to be included as the lead single on their second studio album Eternal Atake (2020), but it did not make the track list.

== Background ==
The song was originally previewed on Uzi's Instagram account on June 16, 2018, in a video where they can be seen dancing to the song's chorus. The album art for the single is a modified frame from the video. Don Cannon, who has worked with and produced many of Uzi Vert's albums and mixtapes, announced the release of "New Patek" on their Instagram account on September 17, 2018. In the Instagram post, a snippet of the song is revealed. The song is composed of a trap beat, built around a sample of the main theme from the anime Death Parade and Uzi Vert's rapping about their "luxurious lifestyle and sexual encounters".

Canadian rapper Drake is mentioned, as well as Rey Mysterio and Naruto. While performing at the Rolling Loud festival in California, Uzi announced that they were releasing a new song, stating that "You know, about one, two, three...three days I'm gonna drop some new shit."

== Charts ==
| Chart (2018) | Peak position |
|---|---|
| Canada Hot 100 (Billboard) | 30 |
| Ireland (IRMA) | 76 |
| New Zealand Hot Singles (RMNZ) | 6 |
| Portugal (AFP) | 83 |
| Sweden Heatseeker (Sverigetopplistan) | 3 |
| UK Singles (Official Charts) | 68 |
| US Billboard Hot 100 | 24 |
| US Hot R&B/Hip-Hop Songs (Billboard) | 14 |

== Certifications ==
| Region | Certification | Certified units/sales |
|---|---|---|
| New Zealand (RMNZ) | Gold | 15,000^{‡} |
| United States (RIAA) | Platinum | 1,000,000^{‡} |
^{‡} Sales+streaming figures based on certification alone.
