= Harverd Dropout =

Studio album by Lil Pump
- Released: February 22, 2019
- Recorded: 2017–2019
- Genre: Hip hop; trap; SoundCloud rap; mumble rap
- Length: 40:21
- Label: Tha Lights Global; Warner
- Producer: Baby Winsch; CBMix; Cubeatz; Danny Wolf; Dee Money; Diablo; Diamond Pistols; Dilip; DJ Clark Kent; Hanzo; David Morse; Kanye West; Lil Pump; Ronny J

Lil Pump chronology
Lil Pump (2017)	Harverd Dropout (2019)	No Name (2021)

Singles from Harverd Dropout
- 1. "Esskeetit" Released: April 13, 2018; 2. "Drug Addicts" Released: July 6, 2018; 3. "I Love It" Released: September 7, 2018; 4. "Multi Millionaire" Released: October 5, 2018; 5. "Butterfly Doors" Released: January 4, 2019; 6. "Racks on Racks" Released: January 31, 2019; 7. "Be Like Me" Released: February 21, 2019

Harverd Dropout is the second studio album by American rapper Lil Pump. It was released through Tha Lights Global and Warner Records on February 22, 2019. The album consists of 16 tracks and features guest appearances from Kanye West, Smokepurpp, Migos rappers Offset and Quavo, Lil Uzi Vert, Lil Wayne, YG, and 2 Chainz. It follows his self-titled debut studio album (2017).

It was supported by seven singles – "Esskeetit", "Drug Addicts", "I Love It" (with Kanye West), "Multi Millionaire" (featuring Lil Uzi Vert), "Butterfly Doors", "Racks on Racks" and "Be Like Me" (featuring Lil Wayne). Harverd Dropout received mixed reviews and debuted at number seven on the US Billboard 200 with 48,000 album-equivalent units, of which 25,000 were pure album sales. It is Lil Pump's second US top 10 album. The album was certified gold by the Recording Industry Association of America (RIAA) on September 27, 2019 for sales over 500,000 units.

== Background and release ==
Lil Pump released his eponymous self-titled album in October 2017. In January 2018, he announced his second project Harverd Dropout, which was finished in April 2018. The project was initially planned to be released on August 17, 2018, Garcia's 18th birthday, but was postponed due to Lil Pump "losing the album".

Following Garcia's arrest on August 29, 2018, for unlicensed driving, Garcia's management team announced the release date of Harverd Dropout to be September 14, 2018. A week later, on September 6, 2018, Lil Pump teamed up with American rapper Kanye West for the song "I Love It" with comedian Adele Givens. The song was released by Lil Pump's management team.

The September 14, 2018, release date was also canceled. In October 2018, he released the song "Multi Millionaire" with Lil Uzi Vert.

"Butterfly Doors" was released on January 4, 2019. Lil Pump then posted the cover art on his social media accounts on January 23, 2019, along with announcing the album's release date as February 22.

On January 31, 2019, "Racks on Racks" was released along with its music video. A day before the album's release, "Be Like Me" featuring Lil Wayne was released as the seventh single.

The album was released on digital streaming platforms on February 22, 2019.

== Critical reception ==
Professional ratings
Aggregate scores
Source	Rating
AnyDecentMusic?	3.7/10
Metacritic	46/100
Review scores
Source	Rating
The 405	6.5/10
AllMusic	2.5/5 stars
Consequence of Sound	D
Highsnobiety	2.5/5
HipHopDX	3.6/5
NME	2/5 stars
Pitchfork	3.8/10
PopMatters	3/10 stars
RapReviews	4/10
Spectrum Culture	2/5 stars

According to the review aggregator Metacritic, Harverd Dropout received "mixed or average reviews" based on a weighted average score of 46 out of 100 from 8 critic scores.

Luke Morgan Britton of NME wrote that much of the album felt like "little more than regurgitated punchlines or uninspired variations on themes already set up and adequately executed on the rapper's early tracks." Alphonse Pierre of Pitchfork felt that by the time of the album's release, Lil Pump's act had become contrived, writing, "Having abandoned his lo-fi roots in the South Florida rap scene, Lil Pump has become a caricature of himself. His second album is sometimes fun but mostly unnecessary." In a negative review, Tommy Monroe of Consequence of Sound felt that the album was weighed down by "songs without structure, lines without meaning, and hooks without melody," calling the release "utterly tasteless." Nick Soulsby of PopMatters heavily criticized the album for its lack of depth and its repetitive nature, writing, "Lil Pump's ambition apparently goes no further than having one song slip onto a party playlist and make just enough impact people occasionally ask for 'that song where the guy says...' having caught the couple of words he's hammered over and over."

Conversely, in a positive review, A.D. Amorosi of Variety wrote that although Lil Pump's style or flow hadn't changed since his initial singles or his self-titled album debut, his songs "[helped] turn trap into a pop-hop vibe," describing the album as "simplistic, contagiously catchy, and occasionally enhanced by rousing choruses." Writing for HipHopDX, Scott Glaysher praised the album's production, while taking note of its polished vocals and improved mixing. He wrote that "the beats are big and brazen" and that "the choruses are wildly catchy and some of the featured guests even get off some decently solid verses."

== Commercial performance ==
Harverd Dropout debuted at number seven on the US Billboard 200 with 48,000 album-equivalent units, of which 25,000 were pure album sales. It is Lil Pump's second US top 10 album. The album was certified gold by the Recording Industry Association of America (RIAA) on September 27, 2019 for sales over 500,000 units.

== Track listing ==
Credits adapted from ASCAP, BMI and Tidal.

No.	Title	Writer(s)	Producer(s)	Length
1.	"Drop Out"	Gazzy Garcia; Sebastian Baldeon	Diablo	2:01
2.	"Nu Uh"	Garcia; Miguel Curtidor; Zain Siddiqui; David Morse	Danny Wolf; Misogi; Morse	1:54
3.	"I Love It" (with Kanye West)	Garcia; Kanye West; Omar Pineiro; Rodolfo Franklin; Christopher Barnett; James Harris III; Tommy Lewis; Ronald Spence, Jr.	West; DJ Clark Kent; CBMix; Ronny J	2:08
4.	"Ion" (featuring Smokepurpp)	Garcia; Pineiro; Baldeon; Barnett	Diablo; CBMix; Smokepurpp	2:22
5.	"Fasho Fasho" (featuring Offset)	Garcia; Kiari Cephus; Barnett	CBMix	2:58
6.	"Racks on Racks"	Garcia; Baldeon; Christian Dold	Diablo; Diamond Pistols	2:09
7.	"Off White"	Garcia; Joshua Goldenburg	Thank You Fizzle	1:55
8.	"Butterfly Doors"	Garcia; Barnett	CBMix	2:12
9.	"Too Much Ice" (featuring Quavo)	Garcia; Quavious Marshall; William Trice	TreeGotti	2:52
10.	"Multi Millionaire" (featuring Lil Uzi Vert)	Garcia; Symere Woods; Curtidor; Dilip Venkatesh; Korey Bryant	Danny Wolf; Dilip; Hanzo	2:50
11.	"Vroom Vroom Vroom"	Garcia; Ronald Spence, Jr.; Kevin Gomringer; Tim Gomringer	Ronny J; Cubeatz	1:54
12.	"Be Like Me" (featuring Lil Wayne)	Garcia; Dwayne Carter, Jr.; Barnett	CBMix	4:01
13.	"Stripper Name" (featuring YG and 2 Chainz)	Garcia; Keenon Jackson; Tauheed Epps; Goldenburg	Fizzle	3:02
14.	"Drug Addicts"	Garcia; Daniel Winsch; Darius Lassiter	Baby Winsch; Dee Money	2:55
15.	"Esskeetit"	Garcia; Barnett	CBMix; Lil Pump	3:01
16.	"Who Dat"	Garcia; Barnett	CBMix	2:03
Total length:				40:21

== Personnel ==
Credits adapted from Tidal.

- CBMix – mixing (track 6, 8, 10, 12, 14, 15), mastering (track 6, 8, 10, 12, 14, 15), recording (track 6, 10, 12, 14, 15)

== Charts ==
Chart (2019)	Peak position
Australian Albums (ARIA)	33
Austrian Albums (Ö3 Austria)	38
Belgian Albums (Ultratop Flanders)	36
Belgian Albums (Ultratop Wallonia)	46
Canadian Albums (Billboard)	7
Czech Albums (ČNS IFPI)	16
Danish Albums (Hitlisten)	17
Dutch Albums (Album Top 100)	21
Finnish Albums (Suomen virallinen lista)	19
French Albums (SNEP)	46
German Albums (Offizielle Top 100)	67
Irish Albums (IRMA)	24
Italian Albums (FIMI)	55
Latvian Albums (LAIPA)	2
Lithuanian Albums (AGATA)	5
Norwegian Albums (VG-lista)	18
Swedish Albums (Sverigetopplistan)	35
Swiss Albums (Schweizer Hitparade)	40
UK Albums (OCC)	48
UK R&B Albums (OCC)	40
US Billboard 200	7
US Top R&B/Hip-Hop Albums (Billboard)	3

== Certifications ==
Region	Certification	Certified units/sales
New Zealand (RMNZ)	Gold	7,500^{‡}
United States (RIAA)	Gold	500,000^{‡}
^{‡} Sales+streaming figures based on certification alone.
