= Drug Addicts (song) =

Single by Lil Pump

from the album Harverd Dropout
- Released: July 6, 2018
- Recorded: 2018
- Genre: Comedy hip hop
- Length: 2:55
- Label: Tha Lights Global; Warner
- Songwriters: Gazzy Garcia; Daniel Winsch; Darius Lassiter
- Producers: Baby Winsch; Dee Money

Lil Pump singles chronology
"Welcome to the Party" (2018)	"Drug Addicts" (2018)	"Kept Back" (2018)

Music video
- "Drug Addicts" on YouTube

"Drug Addicts" is a song by American rapper Lil Pump from his second studio album Harverd Dropout. It was released on July 6, 2018, by Tha Lights Global and Warner Records as the second single for the album.

== Background ==
The song is included in Lil Pump's second studio album, Harverd Dropout. The artwork was revealed on July 4, 2018, when Charlie Sheen tweeted the image on his Twitter account. It features Sheen and Pump wearing matching jumpsuits. In a promotional video showing a conversation between Pump and Sheen posted on Instagram, Pump asks, "What we doing right now?" and Sheen responds with "We're about to make history".

== Music video ==
In May 2018, Lil Pump announced his desire to recruit Charlie Sheen in his next music video. On July 3, 2018, Sheen published an image of himself and Pump, asking him "what day did you want to break the internet", on Twitter. A 50-second snippet was posted by Pump to his Twitter account, urging his followers to retweet if they wanted him to release the video immediately. The snippet has since received over 600,000 views. Consisting of "a narcotic theme and trippy visuals", the music video was officially released on July 5, 2018, featuring Charlie Sheen. It was directed by Hannah Lux Davis. The music video was filmed in Pomona, California.

In the video, Pump and Sheen wheel through a drug cart in a psychedelic hospital ward where the patients smoke, drink and consume drugs alongside the nurses who ride with Pump in a golf cart before gathering in an empty pool for a party.

== Personnel ==
- Baby Winsch – production
- CB Mix – mastering, mixing, recording
- Daniel Ryan Winsch – composer
- Darius Lassiter – composer
- Dee Money – production
- Gazzy Garcia – composer, performer, vocals

== Charts ==
Chart (2018)	Peak position
Canada Hot 100 (Billboard)	52
Hungary (Single Top 40)	21
Sweden Heatseeker (Sverigetopplistan)	9
US Billboard Hot 100	83
US Hot R&B/Hip-Hop Songs (Billboard)	45
