= Butterfly Doors =

Single by Lil Pump

from the album Harverd Dropout
- Released: January 4, 2019
- Recorded: 2018
- Length: 2:12
- Label: Tha Lights Global; Warner
- Songwriters: Gazzy Garcia; Christopher Barnett
- Producer: CBMix

Lil Pump singles chronology
"Arms Around You" (2018)	"Butterfly Doors" (2019)	"Racks on Racks" (2019)

Music video
- "Butterfly Doors" on YouTube

"Butterfly Doors" is a song recorded by American rapper Lil Pump, released on January 4, 2019, as the fifth single for his second album Harverd Dropout. Lil Pump previewed the track in a video posted to social media on December 18, 2018, which drew some criticism due to its use of anti-Asian slurs and gestures, for which he later apologized.

== Background and composition ==
On December 18, 2018, Lil Pump posted a video of himself miming to a clip of the song to his social media accounts. The song features the line "They call me Yao Ming 'cause my eyes real low", and after a later repetition of the line, Lil Pump ad libs "ching chong" and also pulls at the sides of his eyes.

== Music video ==
The music video was released simultaneously with the single on January 4, 2019. It was directed by Ben Griffin and shows Lil Pump performing around female dancers and multiple Lamborghinis.

== Criticism ==
American rapper, comedian and actress Awkwafina, who is of Chinese and South Korean ancestry, criticized the track on Twitter, writing "Always nice to hear a new song with a Ching Chong adlib. Guess it's better than 'eyes chink' like some other verses I've heard. But can we at least think of some more creative racist epithets? @lilpump". The BBC reported that Chinese users of Weibo had posted screenshots of their reporting Lil Pump's video for "inappropriate content".

American rapper, entertainer, activist, and former gang member China Mac had an even more direct response in an Instagram post, saying "Let me tell you something, boy. You're a little kid, so I'm just going to scold you like the little boy you are. When you make these fucking Asian jokes, you pull your eyes, you say all of this ching chong shit. Motherfuckers feel disrespected by that. You're going to put some respect on my fucking culture. You ain't going to be making those statements without fucking getting checked."

Chinese rapper Li Yijie, known as "Pissy" and for being part of a Chinese government-sponsored rap group called CD Rev, released a diss track titled "FXXX Lil Pump". The Chinese government-run tabloid newspaper Global Times quoted Pissy saying that "as a rapper, I'm ashamed with what Lil Pump wrote in his song. Lil Pump, one of the most popular rappers in the US, should not humiliate the spirit of the rap".

Lil Pump later apologized in an Instagram video, saying, "I came here to tell you from my part that I'm sorry and I apologize for posting that. It was not my intention to hurt nobody or do none of that, deadass. Cause I got Asian homies, you know, I fuck with everybody".

On January 4, 2019, Lil Pump released the song with the lyrics in question removed.

== Charts ==
Chart (2018–2019)	Peak position
Belgium (Ultratip Bubbling Under Flanders)	30
Belgium (Ultratip Bubbling Under Wallonia)	23
Canada Hot 100 (Billboard)	48
France (SNEP)	167
Ireland (IRMA)	86
Lithuania (AGATA)	76
New Zealand Hot Singles (RMNZ)	11
Slovakia Singles Digital (ČNS IFPI)	68
Sweden Heatseeker (Sverigetopplistan)	20
Switzerland (Schweizer Hitparade)	85
US Billboard Hot 100	81
US Hot R&B/Hip-Hop Songs (Billboard)	37
