= Welcome to the Party (Diplo, French Montana and Lil Pump song) =

- Remix cover art

Single by Diplo, French Montana and Lil Pump featuring Zhavia Ward

from the album Deadpool 2 (Original Motion Picture Soundtrack)
- Released: May 15, 2018
- Genre: Trap
- Length: 3:01
- Label: Columbia
- Songwriters: Thomas Wesley Pentz; Karim Kharbouch; Gazzy Garcia; Valentino Khan; Jocelyn Donald
- Producers: Diplo; Valentino Khan

Diplo singles chronology
"Stay Open" (2018)	"Welcome to the Party" (2018)	"Sun in Our Eyes" (2018)

French Montana singles chronology
"Olha a Explosão (Remix)" (2018)	"Welcome to the Party" (2018)	"First Time" (2018)

Lil Pump singles chronology
"Esskeetit" (2018)	"Welcome to the Party" (2018)	"Drug Addicts" (2018)

Zhavia Ward singles chronology
"Welcome to the Party" (2018)	"Candlelight" (2018)

Music video
- "Welcome to the Party" on YouTube

"Welcome to the Party" is a song by American music producer Diplo and rappers French Montana and Lil Pump, featuring guest vocals from singer Zhavia Ward. Written by Montana, Pump, Jozzy, and producers Diplo and Valentino Khan, it was released by Columbia Records on May 15, 2018, as the second single from the soundtrack to the film Deadpool 2 (2018).

== Background ==
Montana spoke of the collaboration during an interview on Beats 1: "You know Diplo, he's one of the best at what he do, and it just so happened that he had this beat that he was working on. And me and Lil Pump had us doing the 'Gucci Gang' remix and he played it for me and the way everything came together it was just magic."

== Composition ==
"Welcome to the Party" is an uptempo trap song, which sees Diplo returning to the pre-dubstep era of EDM for the production. It bears a resemblance to TNGHT's song "R U Ready", which was sampled by Kanye West on his 2013 song "Blood on the Leaves". Lyrically, Montana compares the size of his cash flow to human behemoth and NBA player Shaquille O'Neal in the opening verse. Pump raps about his newfound luxurious lifestyle and money spending habits.

== Music video ==
An animated video released on the same day as the song shows an animated version of Deadpool performing popular dance crazes including twerking, BlocBoy JB's "shoot" dance and flossing in front of a blue-gray backdrop. The animation was also included in a Snapchat lens which can be activated by selecting Deadpool's logo.

The official music video, directed by Jason Koenig, was released on May 21, 2018, and features the four artists partying and taking part in havoc and destruction interspersed with clips from the movie.

== Remixes ==
A remix by producer Valentino Khan was released on July 4, 2018. A second remix with Juicy J and Famous Dex, an altered verse from Lil Pump, and without Zhavia Ward, was released on July 27, 2018.

== Personnel ==
Credits adapted from Tidal.

- Diplo – production, drums
- Valentino Khan – production, mix engineering, master engineering, drums, horn
- Maximillian Jaeger – drums, horn, record engineering
- Sebastian "Diablo" Deleon – record engineering
- Baruch "Mixx" Nembhard – record engineering

== Charts ==
2018 weekly chart performance
Chart (2018)	Peak position
Australia (ARIA)	87
Canada Hot 100 (Billboard)	55
Czech Republic Singles Digital (ČNS IFPI)	36
El Salvador Anglo Airplay (Monitor Latino)	11
France (SNEP)	146
Hungary (Single Top 40)	31
Hungary (Stream Top 40)	17
New Zealand Heatseekers (RMNZ)	8
Portugal (AFP)	60
Scottish Singles Sales (Official Charts)	93
Slovakia Singles Digital (ČNS IFPI)	37
US Billboard Hot 100	78
US Hot R&B/Hip-Hop Songs (Billboard)	37
US Rhythmic Airplay (Billboard)	23

2022 weekly chart performance
Chart (2022)	Peak position
El Salvador Anglo Airplay (Monitor Latino)	2

== Certifications ==
Certifications for "Welcome to the Party"
Region	Certification	Certified units/sales
Australia (ARIA)	Platinum	70,000^{‡}
New Zealand (RMNZ)	Gold	15,000^{‡}
Poland (ZPAV)	Platinum	20,000^{‡}
United Kingdom (BPI)	Silver	200,000^{‡}
United States (RIAA)	Platinum	1,000,000^{‡}
^{‡} Sales+streaming figures based on certification alone.

== Release history ==
Release history for "Welcome to the Party"
Region	Date	Format	Label	Ref.
Various	May 15, 2018	Digital download; streaming	Columbia	
United States	May 22, 2018	Contemporary hit radio	Columbia	
United States	May 22, 2018	Rhythmic contemporary radio	Columbia	
