= Multi Millionaire (song) =

2018 song by Lil Pump

Single by Lil Pump featuring Lil Uzi Vert

from the album Harverd Dropout
- Released: October 5, 2018
- Length: 2:50
- Label: Tha Lights Global; Warner
- Songwriters: Gazzy Garcia; Symere Woods; Miguel Curtidor; Dilip Venkatesh; Korey Bryant
- Producers: Danny Wolf; Dilip; Hanzo

Lil Pump singles chronology
"I Love It" (2018)	"Multi Millionaire" (2018)	"Arms Around You" (2018)

Lil Uzi Vert singles chronology
"New Patek" (2018)	"Multi Millionaire" (2018)	"Big Racks" (2018)

"Multi Millionaire" is a song by American rapper Lil Pump featuring fellow American rapper Lil Uzi Vert. It is the fourth single from Lil Pump's second studio album Harverd Dropout (2019). It was released as the album's fourth single on October 5, 2018. The release date of the song marks the day before the first anniversary of Pump's self-titled debut studio album. It was produced by Danny Wolf, Hanzo, and Dilip.

== Background ==
The song samples Gucci Mane's "Multi Millionaire LaFlare" (2016). The single represents the second time Lil Pump has collaborated with Lil Uzi Vert, the first being on a Desto Dubb posse cut titled "Bankteller" that also features 03 Greedo and Smokepurpp. HotNewHipHop described the song as a "frantic synth instrumental, reflecting on the vast extent of their material wealth."

== Composition ==
The song features "heavy drums" with an "electro-laser" melody and Pump's signature one-word repeat. Uzi Vert appears during their verse after the second hook. Consequence of Sound described the song as featuring "the two MCs boasting about lovers located all over the globe, pricey loads of drugs, and even more expensive rides."

== Charts ==
Chart (2018)	Peak position
Canada Hot 100 (Billboard)	99
Greece International Digital Singles (IFPI)	71
New Zealand Hot Singles (RMNZ)	28
