= Esskeetit =

Single by Lil Pump

from the album Harverd Dropout
- Released: April 13, 2018
- Recorded: December 2017
- Genre: Hip hop; trap
- Length: 3:03
- Label: Tha Lights Global; Warner
- Songwriters: Gazzy Garcia; Christopher Barnett
- Producers: CBMix; Lil Pump

Lil Pump singles chronology
"I Shyne" (2018)	"Esskeetit" (2018)	"Welcome to the Party" (2018)

Music video
- Esskeetit on YouTube

"Esskeetit" is a song by American rapper Lil Pump. The single and its music video were released on April 13, 2018. Written and produced alongside CBMix, the song debuted and peaked at number 24 on the Billboard Hot 100.

== Background and release ==
The first snippet of the song was posted to Lil Pump's official Twitter account on February 6, 2018 . Pump previewed the song and its music video multiple times on Twitter and Instagram, originally intended to be released on April 8, 2018. However, its release was pushed back to April 13 due to copyright issues. The song takes its title from Pump's signature phrase, which means "Let's get it". Lyrically, the song references drugs including Ecstasy (a.k.a. "X") and Actavis, along with luxury brands including Porsche, and Patek Phillipe, among others.

== Music video ==
The song's music video, directed by Pump himself along with Ben Griffin, was premiered with its release. As of February 2023, the video has received over 530 million views on YouTube.

== Live performance ==
On May 24, 2018, Pump performed "Esskeetit" on The Tonight Show Starring Jimmy Fallon.

== Charts ==
=== Weekly charts ===
Chart (2018)	Peak position
Belgium (Ultratip Bubbling Under Flanders)	14
Belgium (Ultratip Bubbling Under Wallonia)	19
Canada Hot 100 (Billboard)	25
France (SNEP)	103
Hungary (Single Top 40)	6
Hungary (Stream Top 40)	34
Italy (FIMI)	84
New Zealand Heatseeker (RMNZ)	5
Portugal (AFP)	40
Sweden (Sverigetopplistan)	74
Switzerland (Schweizer Hitparade)	74
UK Singles (Official Charts)	89
US Billboard Hot 100	24
US Hot R&B/Hip-Hop Songs (Billboard)	16
US Rhythmic Airplay (Billboard)	27

=== Year-end charts ===
Chart (2018)	Position
US Hot R&B/Hip-Hop Songs (Billboard)	75

== Certifications ==
Region	Certification	Certified units/sales
New Zealand (RMNZ)	Gold	15,000^{‡}
Poland (ZPAV)	Gold	25,000^{‡}
United States (RIAA)	Gold	500,000^{‡}
^{‡} Sales+streaming figures based on certification alone.
