= Arms Around You =

2018 single by XXXTentacion and Lil Pump featuring Maluma and Swae Lee

Single by XXXTentacion and Lil Pump featuring Maluma and Swae Lee
- Language: English • Spanish
- Released: October 25, 2018
- Recorded: 2017
- Genre: Club; pop; dancehall; hip hop
- Length: 3:18
- Label: Tha Lights Global; Warner; Bad Vibes Forever; Empire
- Songwriters: Edgar Barrera; Gazzy Garcia; Jahseh Onfroy; Rio Santana; Mally Mall; JonFX; Juan Luis Londoño; Khalif Brown; Sonny Moore
- Producers: Skrillex; Mally Mall; JonFX

XXXTentacion singles chronology
"Falling Down" (2018)	"Arms Around You" (2018)	"Bad!" (2018)

Lil Pump singles chronology
"Multi Millionaire" (2018)	"Arms Around You" (2018)	"Overseas" (2019)

Maluma singles chronology
"Amigos con Derechos" (2018)	"Arms Around You" (2018)	"Créeme" (2018)

Swae Lee singles chronology
"Close to Me" (2018)	"Arms Around You" (2018)	"Better to Lie" (2018)

Music video
- "Arms Around You" on YouTube

"Arms Around You" is a song by American rappers XXXTentacion and Lil Pump featuring Colombian singer Maluma and fellow American rapper Swae Lee. Released on October 25, 2018, it was written by producer JonFX and later sung by Rio Santana. Additional lyrics for Maluma were written by engineer Edge, JonFX, and fellow producers Skrillex and Mally Mall.

== Background ==
The track was originally written and recorded in 2017 with Rio Santana, who appeared on XXXTentacion's ? album, but after his death, the label took over and added other co-features. Lil Pump contacted XXXTentacion's mother Cleopatra Bernard after his death to ask if he could make a song to "honor his legacy", which resulted in the collaboration.

== Critical reception ==
Rap-Up called the track a "global crossover track" featuring "Latin, alternative, hip-hop and pop influences". Michael Saponara of Billboard wrote that XXXTentacion "implements an intoxicating flow mixed with some Spanish over the Mally Mall, Jon FX, handling the reggaeton-tinged track's chorus duties". C. Vernon Coleman II of XXL also felt the track had a "reggaeton feel", with Pump "stunt[ing] heavy as usual" and Swae Lee delivering a "rosy verse". In addition, Winston Cook-Wilson of Spin called the track "house-inflected".

While Ben Kaye of Consequence of Sound labeled it a "Latin-flavored club jam", he also stated that the timing of its release was "a bit of cringeworthy irony" with XXXTentacion's line in the chorus about protecting someone, Kaye said a recently released recording features him "confessing to multiple violent crimes including assaulting his girlfriend and stabbing eight people", though this interpretation of the recording was disputed. Brendan Klinkenberg of Rolling Stone felt that the song is "bland, Latin-inflected pop that reflects none of the talents of its four collaborators" and also called it "a mish-mash of vague pop-in-2018 signifiers without cohering into any sort of artistic statement".

== Promotion ==
Skrillex initially teased the track on Twitter and previewed the track on his Instagram, but later deleted the post. NME noted that the post featured the hashtag "#LLJ" which stands for "Long Live Jahseh", XXXTentacion's real first name.

== Music video ==
A music video for "Arms Around You" was released on November 16, 2018. It was directed by James Lerese and features an animated XXXTentacion.

== Personnel ==
Credits adapted from Tidal.

- XXXTentacion – vocals, composition
- Lil Pump – vocals, composition
- Maluma – vocals, composition
- Swae Lee – vocals, composition
- Edgar Barrera – composition, engineer
- Rio Santana – composition
- Skrillex – production, composition, instrumentation, mix engineer
- Mally Mall – production, instrumentation
- JonFX – production, instrumentation
- Rashawn Mclean – assistant mix engineer
- Mike Seaberg – assistant mix engineer
- Jacob Richards – assistant mix engineer
- Brandon Brown – assistant mix engineer
- Gerald Yusuf – recording engineer
- Koen Heldens – mix engineer
- Tom Norris – mix engineer
- Jaycen Joshua – mix engineer
- Dave Kutch – mastering engineer
- Gil Corber – A&R consultant
- Eesean Bolden – A&R

== Charts ==
=== Weekly charts ===
Chart (2018–19)	Peak position
Argentina (Argentina Hot 100)	62
Australia (ARIA)	14
Austria (Ö3 Austria Top 40)	15
Belgium (Ultratop 50 Flanders)	34
Belgium (Ultratip Bubbling Under Wallonia)	7
Canada Hot 100 (Billboard)	13
Czech Republic Singles Digital (ČNS IFPI)	6
Denmark (Tracklisten)	9
Estonia (IFPI)	1
Finland (Suomen virallinen lista)	5
France (SNEP)	25
Germany (GfK)	16
Hungary (Single Top 40)	8
Hungary (Stream Top 40)	3
Ireland (IRMA)	8
Israel (Media Forest TV Airplay)	1
Italy (FIMI)	13
Lithuania (AGATA)	1
Netherlands (Dutch Tipparade 40)	1
Netherlands (Single Top 100)	16
New Zealand (Recorded Music NZ)	15
Norway (VG-lista)	10
Portugal (AFP)	2
Romania (Airplay 100)	84
Scottish Singles Sales (Official Charts)	67
Singapore (RIAS)	22
Slovakia Airplay (ČNS IFPI)	61
Spain (PROMUSICAE)	35
Sweden (Sverigetopplistan)	8
Switzerland (Schweizer Hitparade)	5
UK Singles (Official Charts)	14
US Billboard Hot 100	28
US Hot R&B/Hip-Hop Songs (Billboard)	16
US Rhythmic Airplay (Billboard)	9

=== Year-end charts ===
Chart (2018)	Position
Portugal (AFP)	96
Chart (2019)	Position
Canada (Canadian Hot 100)	93
France (SNEP)	159
Portugal (AFP)	70
US Hot R&B/Hip-Hop Songs (Billboard)	72
US Rhythmic (Billboard)	40

== Certifications ==
Region	Certification	Certified units/sales
Australia (ARIA)	Platinum	70,000^{‡}
Denmark (IFPI Danmark)	Gold	45,000^{‡}
France (SNEP)	Platinum	200,000^{‡}
Germany (BVMI)	Gold	200,000^{‡}
Italy (FIMI)	Platinum	50,000^{‡}
New Zealand (RMNZ)	Platinum	30,000^{‡}
Poland (ZPAV)	Gold	25,000^{‡}
Portugal (AFP)	Platinum	10,000^{‡}
Spain (Promusicae)	Gold	30,000^{‡}
United Kingdom (BPI)	Gold	400,000^{‡}
United States (RIAA)	Platinum	1,000,000^{‡}
^{‡} Sales+streaming figures based on certification alone.
