= I Love It (Lil Pump and Kanye West song) =

2018 single by Kanye West and Lil Pump featuring Adele Givens

Single by Lil Pump and Kanye West

from the album Harverd Dropout
- Released: September 7, 2018
- Genre: Dirty rap; trap; comedy hip-hop
- Length: 2:08
- Label: Def Jam; GOOD; Tha Lights Global; Warner Bros.
- Songwriters: Kanye West; Omar Jeffery Pineiro; Gazzy Garcia; Rodolfo Franklin; Christopher Barnett; James Harris III; Tommy Lewis; Ronald Spence Jr.
- Producers: Kanye West; DJ Clark Kent; CBMix; Ronny J

Lil Pump singles chronology
"Kept Back" (2018)	"I Love It" (2018)	"Multi Millionaire" (2018)

Kanye West singles chronology
"XTCY" (2018)	"I Love It" (2018)	"Take Me to the Light" (2019)

Music video
- "I Love It" on YouTube

"I Love It" is a song by American rappers Lil Pump and Kanye West, featuring guest vocals by American comedian Adele Givens, using snippets from her 1992 episode of Def Comedy Jam. The song was produced by West alongside DJ Clark Kent and frequent Lil Pump collaborator CBMix, with additional production by Ronny J. The song premiered at the 2018 Pornhub Awards. "I Love It" reached number one in Canada, Finland, New Zealand and Sweden, as well as the top 10 in Australia, the United Kingdom and the United States. The song is the third single from Lil Pump's second studio album, Harverd Dropout (2019).

== Background and release ==
Kanye West was the creative director of the inaugural Pornhub Awards on September 6, 2018. After a live performance with Teyana Taylor, West later premiered the music video for his new song with Lil Pump. West raps in a sexually explicit way, mirroring his performance in the songs "I'm In It" (2013) and "XTCY" (2018).

A remix with GOOD Music signee Valee has also been recorded but has yet to be released. An edited version of the song known as "I Love It (Freaky Girl Edit)" was released to the iTunes Store on September 7, 2018, which West and Pump performed live on Saturday Night Live on September 29. The album suffered from multiple delays and was eventually scrapped. When Pump shared the track list for his second studio album Harverd Dropout on February 19, 2019, "I Love It" was shown to be the album's third track.

== Artwork ==
The artwork was painted by Shadi Al-Atallah, who also painted the artwork for West's previous single "XTCY". West asked Al-Atallah to paint the artwork using a color scheme inspired by a Kerry James Marshall painting.

== Reception ==
The song was panned by music critics. Sheldon Pearce of Pitchfork described everything about it as what "feels like it belongs in a Saturday Night Live sketch about [West] that got cut". West later expressed regret over making the track, stating in an interview with Big Boy's Neighborhood: "Oh, I bet you the Devil was happy on that day."

== Controversy ==
On September 13, 2018, DJ David Morales accused West of stealing the bass line of "I Love It" from his remix of Alexander O'Neal's song "What Is This Thing Called Love?".

West's ex-girlfriend Amber Rose posted to her Instagram on September 18 accusing West and Pump of being inspired by her SlutWalk movement for the track, yet giving no credit.

== Music video ==
A still from the music video showing Kanye West (left) and Lil Pump (right) wearing giant rectangular body suits

A music video for the single was premiered at the 2018 Pornhub Awards and features an appearance from Adele Givens. West and Lil Pump wear giant, rectangular body suits reminiscent of characters from the video game platform Roblox as they walk behind a giant Givens down a hallway lined with women covered in mesh cloth posing as statues, while Givens occasionally turns to give them stern looks. The women statues can be seen moving, breathing, and shifting throughout the video. The video was executive-produced by Spike Jonze and directed by West and Amanda Adelson. Shortly after the release, Jonze revealed the early sketches for it. The music video garnered 76 million views globally in its first week surpassing "This Is America" by Childish Gambino as the biggest opening week on YouTube for a hip-hop video. Soon after its release, the video became a popular internet meme.

== Commercial performance ==
In the United States, the song debuted at number six on the US Billboard Hot 100, making it Kanye West's 17th top-ten song and Lil Pump's second top ten on the chart. On May 16, 2019, "I Love It" was certified double Platinum by the Recording Industry Association of America (RIAA) for selling over two million units in the United States.

In the United Kingdom, "I Love It" debuted at number three on the UK singles chart. It serves as Kanye West's first single to reach the top five since 2015 collaboration "FourFiveSeconds" with Rihanna and Paul McCartney, as well as his 19th top-ten song and Lil Pump's very first top ten on the chart. The single was certified Gold in the UK on December 14, 2018, by the British Phonographic Industry (BPI).

In Canada, the song debuted at number one on the Canadian Hot 100, making it West's third and Lil Pump's first number-one single.

== Track listings ==
- Digital download
1. "I Love It" – 2:08
- Digital download
1. "I Love It" (Freaky Girl) (Edit) – 2:08

== Credits and personnel ==
Credits adapted from Tidal.

- Kanye West – production, vocals
- Lil Pump – vocals
- Smokepurpp – writer
- DJ Clark Kent – production
- CBMix – production
- Ronny J – additional production
- Zack Djurich – engineering
- Mike Dean – mixing
- Jess Jackson – mixing

== Charts ==
=== Weekly charts ===
Weekly chart performance
Chart (2018)	Peak position
Australia (ARIA)	4
Austria (Ö3 Austria Top 40)	7
Belgium (Ultratop 50 Flanders)	18
Belgium Urban (Ultratop Flanders)	13
Belgium (Ultratop 50 Wallonia)	43
Canada Hot 100 (Billboard)	1
Croatia (HRT)	79
Czech Republic Singles Digital (ČNS IFPI)	3
Denmark (Tracklisten)	2
Estonia (Eesti Ekspress)	2
Finland (Suomen virallinen lista)	1
France (SNEP)	27
Germany (GfK)	9
Greece International Digital Singles (IFPI)	1
Hungary (Single Top 40)	6
Hungary (Stream Top 40)	2
Iceland (Tónlistinn)	19
Ireland (IRMA)	2
Italy (FIMI)	19
Lithuania (AGATA)	1
Netherlands (Dutch Top 40)	16
Netherlands (Single Top 100)	8
New Zealand (Recorded Music NZ)	1
Norway (VG-lista)	2
Portugal (AFP)	4
Russia (Tophit)	414
Scottish Singles Sales (Official Charts)	19
Slovakia Singles Digital (ČNS IFPI)	2
Spain (PROMUSICAE)	44
Sweden (Sverigetopplistan)	1
Switzerland (Schweizer Hitparade)	6
UK Singles (Official Charts)	3
UK Hip Hop/R&B (Official Charts)	1
US Billboard Hot 100	6
US Dance Club Songs (Billboard)	55
US Hot R&B/Hip-Hop Songs (Billboard)	5
US Pop Airplay (Billboard)	38
US Rhythmic Airplay (Billboard)	13

=== Year-end charts ===
Annual chart rankings
Chart (2018)	Position
Australia (ARIA)	89
Belgium Urban (Ultratop Flanders)	28
Canada (Canadian Hot 100)	78
Denmark (Tracklisten)	91
Estonia (Eesti Ekspress)	70
Hungary (Stream Top 40)	53
UK Singles (Official Charts Company)	95
US Hot R&B/Hip-Hop Songs (Billboard)	56
US Streaming Songs (Billboard)	69

== Certifications ==
Region	Certification	Certified units/sales
Australia (ARIA)	3× Platinum	210,000^{‡}
Brazil (Pro-Música Brasil)	3× Platinum	120,000^{‡}
Denmark (IFPI Danmark)	Platinum	90,000^{‡}
France (SNEP)	Gold	100,000^{‡}
Germany (BVMI)	Gold	200,000^{‡}
Italy (FIMI)	Gold	25,000^{‡}
New Zealand (RMNZ)	2× Platinum	60,000^{‡}
Poland (ZPAV)	Gold	25,000^{‡}
Portugal (AFP)	Platinum	10,000^{‡}
Spain (Promusicae)	Gold	30,000^{‡}
United Kingdom (BPI)	Platinum	600,000^{‡}
United States (RIAA)	2× Platinum	2,000,000^{‡}
^{‡} Sales+streaming figures based on certification alone.

== Release history ==
Region	Date	Format	Label	Ref.
Various	September 7, 2018	Digital download	GOOD Music; Def Jam; Tha Lights Global; Warner Bros.	
Italy	September 14, 2018	Contemporary hit radio	Universal	

== See also ==
- List of Billboard Hot 100 top-ten singles in 2018
- List of Canadian Hot 100 number-one singles of 2018
- List of number-one singles and albums in Sweden
- List of top 10 singles for 2018 in Australia
- List of UK R&B Singles Chart number ones of 2018
- List of UK top-ten singles in 2018
