= Lil Pump =

American rapper (born 2000)

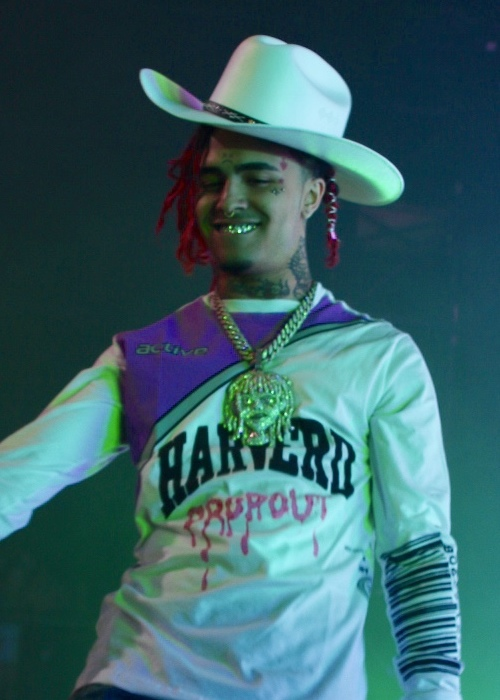
- Lil Pump in 2019

Background information
- Also known as: Pump; Jetski; Pump Hefner
- Born: Gazzy Fabio Garcia; August 17, 2000 (age 26); Miami, Florida, U.S.
- Genres: Mumble rap; trap; punk rap
- Occupations: Rapper; songwriter
- Works: Lil Pump discography
- Years active: 2015–present
- Labels: Tha Lights Global; Warner (former)
- Producer(s): Bighead; CBMix

Gazzy Fabio Garcia (born August 17, 2000), known professionally as Lil Pump, is an American rapper. He rose to prominence as part of the SoundCloud rap scene in the late 2010s, gaining distinction for his minimalist music and rambunctious public persona. Born and raised in Miami, Florida, he gained mainstream attention following the release of his 2017 single "Gucci Gang", which peaked at number three on the Billboard Hot 100 and preceded his self-titled debut studio album, released by Warner Records in October of that year.

"Gucci Gang", despite being panned by critics, received quintuple platinum certification by the Recording Industry Association of America (RIAA), while its parent album peaked at number three on the Billboard 200. In the following two years, he saw continued success with his singles "I Love It" (with Kanye West featuring Adele Givens), "Esskeetit", "Drug Addicts", "Butterfly Doors", "Be Like Me" (featuring Lil Wayne), and "Welcome to the Party" (with Diplo and French Montana featuring Zhavia Ward) for the Deadpool 2 soundtrack. His second album, Harverd Dropout (2019), peaked at number seven on the Billboard 200 and was panned by critics. His third album, Lil Pump 2 (2023), was met with mixed critical reception and failed to chart in any known territory.

== Early life ==
Gazzy Fabio Garcia was born on August 17, 2000, in Miami, Florida. In a 2018 interview with J. Cole, Garcia stated that his parents are from Colombia and divorced when he was 6 years old.

When Garcia was 13 years old, his cousin, Lil Ominous, introduced him to Omar Pineiro, better known as Smokepurpp; the two eventually became collaborators. Garcia and Pineiro were expelled from multiple district schools. Garcia, thereafter, enrolled in an opportunity high school but was expelled in the tenth grade for fighting and inciting a riot.

== Career ==
=== Career beginnings, rising popularity, and Lil Pump (2015–2017) ===
Garcia's rap career began when Smokepurpp produced a track and asked him to freestyle over it. The single produced was independently released in 2016 on the music streaming website SoundCloud, as his debut single, "Lil Pump". Garcia quickly followed the song with singles "Elementary", "Ignorant", "Gang Shit", and "Drum$tick", each garnering over three million streams. The success of his tracks on SoundCloud earned him recognition among the South Florida underground rap scene, in a style known as "SoundCloud rap". He co-headlined the No Jumper tour in 2016, and also performed at the Rolling Loud Festival. While rising in popularity and releasing underground hits, Pump would also meet other rappers like XXXTentacion, Ski Mask the Slump God, Fat Nick and Pouya.

Garcia began gaining attention in 2017 by releasing the singles "D Rose" and "Boss", which were major hits on SoundCloud, collecting a combined 70 million streams. The popularity of "D Rose" led to a music video being produced by Chicago-based director Cole Bennett, also known as Lyrical Lemonade. On June 9, 2017, Garcia signed a record deal with Tha Lights Global and Warner Records, just two months before his seventeenth birthday. However, in January 2018, his contract with Warner Bros. Records was voided because he had been a minor at the time of signing.

In July 2017, Garcia announced on Twitter that his debut mixtape was in the works and would be released in August. However, the album was not released in August and was pushed back. He instead released the song "Gucci Gang", which became his first Billboard Hot 100 entry, peaking at number three on November 8, 2017. The song was certified gold and platinum by the Recording Industry Association of America on January 11, 2018, and as of July 31, 2018, is certified triple platinum. At age 17, Garcia rose to fame after he released his debut studio album, Lil Pump (released October 6, 2017), featuring Smokepurpp, Gucci Mane, Lil Yachty, Chief Keef, Rick Ross, and 2 Chainz.

=== Harverd Dropout (2018–2019) ===
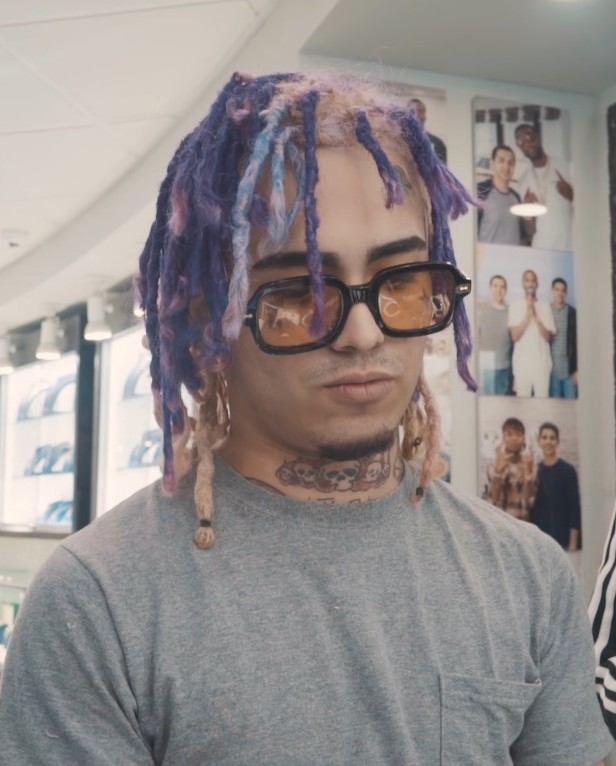
Garcia in 2018

Garcia released "I Shyne" on January 18, 2018, with producer Carnage. Following reports that he had left his former labels Tha Lights Global and Warner Records and the contract had been voided on the grounds of him being a minor when he signed, competition rose to sign Garcia with offers reportedly as high as $8 million to $12 million or more, and artists such as Gucci Mane and DJ Khaled taking interest in him. Garcia sparked rumors he had signed with Gucci Mane's imprint, 1017 Records, in February 2018. Nonetheless, he re-signed another contract with Tha Lights Global and Warner Records for $8 million on March 12.

On April 13, 2018, Garcia released the single "Esskeetit", which debuted and peaked at number 24 on the Billboard Hot 100. On May 24, 2018, Garcia performed "Esskeetit" on The Tonight Show Starring Jimmy Fallon on May 24. In June, he was featured on XXL Freshmen Class. In July that year, he released the single "Drug Addicts" alongside a music video which features the actor Charlie Sheen. On September 7, 2018, Garcia collaborated with Kanye West and comedian Adele Givens for the track "I Love It". The track went straight to number 1 on the Canadian Hot 100. Garcia announced in August 2018 a tour to promote his unreleased album Harverd Dropout, but it was cancelled a month later due to "unforeseen circumstances". He released "Multi Millionaire" on October 5 as a single featuring Lil Uzi Vert. On October 25, dubstep producer Skrillex released the song "Arms Around You", which is a collaboration he made with Garcia, Maluma, Swae Lee and posthumous vocals from XXXTentacion.

On December 16, 2018, Garcia was accused of being racist towards Asians after previewing a snippet of his new song "Butterfly Doors"; the lyrics contained Asian stereotypes and slurs including "Ching chong" and "they call me Yao Ming cause my eyes real low". While rapping the latter lyric, Garcia mockingly pulled his eyes back. This generated negative press coverage and caused Chinese rappers, including CD Rev and Awkwafina, to release diss tracks against him. On December 24, he uploaded an apology video on Instagram regarding the incident and later released the single with the offensive lyrics edited out. On February 21, 2019, Garcia released the song "Be Like Me" featuring Lil Wayne. A music video featuring both of the artists was also released. He performed "Be Like Me" on Jimmy Kimmel Live! on February 25. On February 22, he released his debut studio album Harverd Dropout, featuring Kanye West, Lil Wayne, Offset, Quavo, Smokepurpp, Lil Uzi Vert, 2 Chainz, and YG. In the same year, he was featured on Forbes 30 under 30 list.

=== Subsequent ventures, No Name, and Lil Pump 2 (2020–present) ===
On February 13, 2020, Garcia stated on his Instagram story "I'm done doing music I quit..."; he did not elaborate. However days later he said on the same platform, "Yall Thought I Quit Bitch Im Back", and previewed a new song. He also announced that Lil Pump 2 was the title of his upcoming album. On September 16, 2020, Garcia released a new single "Life Like Me" on his SoundCloud account. The song was first previewed in 2018. Later that same year, Garcia released various SoundCloud exclusives including "Lil Pimp Big MAGA Steppin" and "I'monna".

In March 2021, Garcia went into partnership with the NFT marketplace Sweet to release a special NFT collection that includes digital jewelry and Lil Pump trading cards. On August 12, 2021, "Racks to the Ceiling", featuring Canadian rapper Tory Lanez, was released. On December 14, 2021, Garcia and producer Ronny J silently released a new album titled No Name. Unlike Garcia's previous release, Harverd Dropout, the new album was never mentioned on social media, leading it to become a commercial failure.

On April 12, 2022, Garcia released the lead single for Lil Pump 2, "All The Sudden". He released four more singles for the album after this, "Splurgin", "Mosh Pit", "She Know" and "Tesla". In March 2023, Pump would announce the cover and tracklist for his long-awaited second studio album Lil Pump 2, which features guest appearances from Smokepurpp, YoungBoy Never Broke Again, Ty Dolla Sign, among others. The album was released on March 17. Despite receiving more promotion on social media, the album was another commercial failure with the album failing to land on any chart. The deluxe version of Lil Pump 2, was released on September 15, 2023, containing new tracks: "6 Rings", "Glow in the Dark", "I Sell" and "Rick Rubin".

== Personal life ==
Garcia has said on social media and in lyrics that he has difficulty reading due to having dyslexia. In December 2020 during the COVID-19 pandemic, he was banned from JetBlue after refusing to wear a mask on a flight from Fort Lauderdale to Los Angeles. On his Instagram account, Garcia said that his father Fabio Garcia died on April 8, 2022.

=== Politics ===
On October 26, 2020, Garcia endorsed the campaign of President Donald Trump in the 2020 United States presidential election, citing Joe Biden's tax plan as his reasoning. Lil Pump has made posts on social media wearing the Trump campaign's Make America Great Again baseball cap. On November 2, Trump brought Lil Pump out to speak at his rally in Michigan, mistakenly calling him "Little Pimp". Despite this endorsement, it was later revealed that Garcia was not a registered voter. It was revealed that Garcia also deleted a 2016 tweet of his that read "FUCK DONALD TRUMP" after it went viral on Twitter.

Garcia has continued his support for Trump in 2024. In August of that year, as part of Trump's 2024 presidential campaign, Garcia announced plans to perform a diss track against Kamala Harris at a Trump rally, although he later backtracked, instead announcing that he would write a song in support of Donald Trump rather than a diss track. In addition, he stated that he would have left the United States if Harris were to win the 2024 United States presidential election.

In June 2025, Garcia arrived in Russia, despite the ongoing Russian invasion of Ukraine, and performed at a concert in Moscow with rapper Smokepurpp.

== Legal issues ==
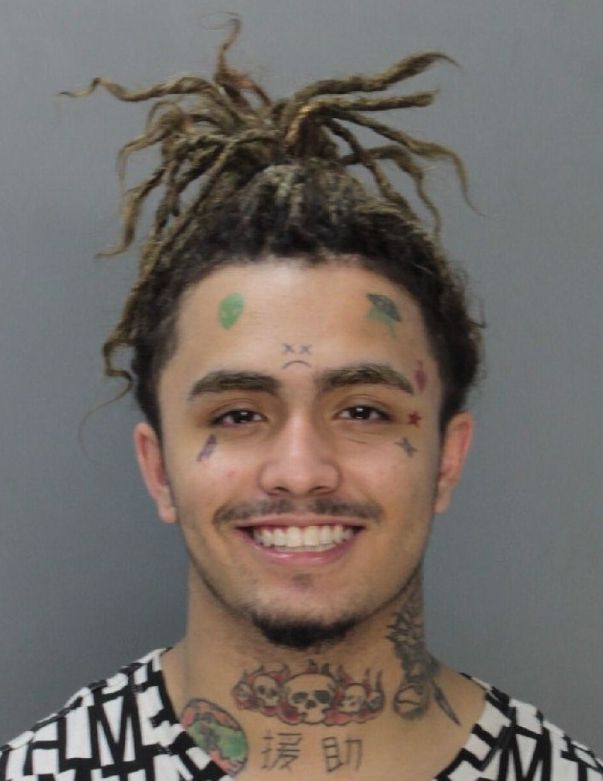
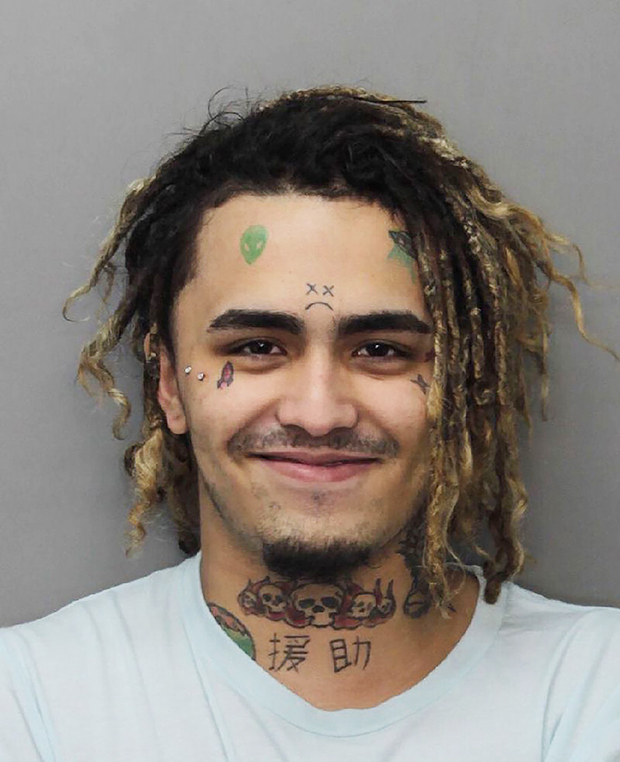
Lil Pump mugshots in 2018

On February 15, 2018, Garcia was arrested for discharging a weapon in an inhabited place. According to his manager, three men attempted to break into his home in San Fernando Valley at around 4 pm before shooting into the door. Police found the bullet may have come from inside the home, coming back later with a search warrant before finding an unloaded handgun below the balcony with ammunition elsewhere in the residence. Garcia's mother was subsequently investigated for endangering a minor and having an unsecured firearm at the home.

On August 29, 2018, Garcia was arrested for driving without a license in Miami. On September 3, he announced that he would be going to jail for "a few months" for a parole violation stemming from the arrest. However, he appeared on the live American television show Saturday Night Live on September 29. Garcia's manager told Billboard in October 2018 that Garcia had served a prison sentence, but did not give any further details.

On December 4, 2018, Garcia was arrested by Danish police after a performance in Vega, Copenhagen, for possessing marijuana; he was fined $700–800. He later live streamed himself flipping his middle finger at a police officer while being detained. He was subsequently banned from entering the country for two years.

On December 13, 2018, Garcia was arrested at a Miami airport for disorderly conduct as he was about to take off on a flight; security wanted to search Garcia's luggage for cannabis but Garcia insisted he did not have any. While no drugs were found, during the encounter with police Garcia became angry and began arguing loudly with the security employees. He was subsequently taken into custody.

In November 2021, the IRS filed a lien on his Miami home for unpaid taxes in the amount of $1.6 million.

== Discography ==
Studio albums

- Lil Pump (2017)
- Harverd Dropout (2019)
- Lil Pump 2 (2023)
- Lil Pump 3 (TBA)

== Awards and nominations ==
| Award | Year | Category | Nominated work | Result | Ref. |
|---|---|---|---|---|---|
| Billboard Music Awards | 2018 | Top Streaming Song | "Gucci Gang" | Nominated | |
| MTV Video Music Awards | 2018 | Best New Artist | Himself | Nominated | |
| MTV Video Music Awards | 2019 | Best Art Direction | "I Love It" | Nominated | |
| IHeartRadio Music Awards | 2019 | Best New Hip-hop Artist | Himself | Nominated | |
