= 2017 in hip-hop =

This article summarizes the events, album releases, and album release dates in hip-hop for the year 2017.

== Events ==
=== January ===
- On January 8, Drake's Summer Sixteen Tour was declared the highest grossing hip-hop concert tour in history with a gross of $84,300,000 from a total of 54 different shows. The previous record holder was Jay-Z and Kanye West's Watch the Throne Tour, which made a total of $75,000,000 from 63 live shows.
- On January 9, West Coast record producer and DJ Crazy Toones died at the age of 45 from a heart attack.
- On January 18, 21 Savage announced that he had signed a deal with Epic Records. The same day that Fat Joe announced that he had signed a management deal with Jay Z's Roc Nation company.
- On January 19, XXXTentacion's court date for his October 2016 arrest was pushed back to April 1.

=== February ===
- On February 7, Jim Jones announced that he signed a management deal with Jay Z's Roc Nation company, ending their long-standing feud.
- On February 10, Gucci Mane announced that Ralo was the first artist to sign to his latest imprint of 1017 Records.
- On February 13, Philadelphia rapper E-Dubble died from a blood infection.
- On February 16, Canadian rapper Nav announced that he had signed to The Weeknd's label XO Records.
- On February 20, Atlanta-based rapper J.I.D announced that he had signed to J. Cole's record label, Dreamville Records.
- On February 24, Nicki Minaj's lyrics on the songs "Make Love" and "Swalla" ignited a feud between herself and Remy Ma. The following day, Remy Ma released the song "ShETHER" in response.
- On February 28, Kodak Black was arrested for probation violation. The same day Vic Mensa was arrested in Beverly Hills and charged with carrying a concealed weapon. He was later released on a $35,000 bail.

=== March ===
- On March 3, Shady Records announced that it had signed a deal with Griselda Records for artists Westside Gunn and Conway.
- On March 5, Lud Foe was involved in a life-threatening car accident with an 18-wheeler that left him a broken jaw, two broken wrists, and several fractures and wounds.
- On March 7, PUMA announced that Big Sean had signed a deal to launch a line of clothing with the company under the title of "Creative Collaborator and Global Brand Ambassador".
- On March 15, Meek Mill was charged with misdemeanor assault after being involved in an altercation with two employees at St. Louis International Airport. He was later given a court summons.
- On March 20, Nicki Minaj surpassed Aretha Franklin for the most entries on the Billboard Hot 100 of any female artist with 76 different entries on the chart.
- On March 29, both XXXTentacion and Lil Twist were released from prison.

=== April ===
- On April 1, Big Sean was awarded the key to the city of Detroit for his work with his own charity, the Sean Anderson Foundation. He is the youngest person in history to receive the award. Other holders of the key to the city of Detroit include former Iraqi President Saddam Hussein and Stevie Wonder.
- On April 4, Kanye West's The Life of Pablo became the first streaming-only album to be certified platinum by the Recording Industry of America (RIAA), with it being streamed over 3,000,000,000 times worldwide.
- On April 12, Birdman revealed on picture-sharing social network Instagram that he had accepted a plaque in honor of his record label Cash Money Records, selling 1,000,000,000 units.

=== June ===
- On June 13, XXL released their tenth annual Freshman Class, including A Boogie wit da Hoodie, PnB Rock, Playboi Carti, Ugly God, Kyle, Aminé, MadeinTYO, Kamaiyah, Kap G, and XXXTentacion.
- On June 15, 40 Glocc was shot twice while attending a funeral in San Bernardino, California.
- On June 20, Prodigy died in Las Vegas, Nevada, with no official cause of death known. Initially, it was presumed his death was from sickle-cell anemia; which he had suffered from his entire life. However, it was revealed in August that he died from accidental choking at a hospital in Las Vegas.

=== July ===
- On July 17, Forbes reported that hip-hop/R&B (which Nielsen SoundScan classifies as the same genre) had recently usurped rock as the most consumed musical genre, becoming the most popular genre in music for the first time in U.S. history.

=== September ===
- On September 3, Lil Wayne was hospitalized in Chicago for suffering multiple seizures.
- On September 11, "Da Real Gee Money" was shot and killed in Baton Rouge.
- On September 27, Young Dolph was ambushed during a gunfight in Hollywood. He was rushed to the hospital after gunshot wounds were discovered.

=== October ===
- On October 27, XXXTentacion announced on Instagram that he would be retiring from the music industry due to negativity and backlash.
- On October 30, Remy Ma signed a deal with Columbia Records.

=== November ===
- On November 5, Meek Mill was sentenced to 2–4 years of prison for violating probation on a 10-year drug and weapon case.
- On November 15, Lil Peep was pronounced dead due to an overdose, moments before he was supposed to perform at a show in Tucson. It was reported to be a mixture of Xanax laced with fentanyl.
- On November 27, Nipsey Hussle signed a multi-album deal with Atlantic Records.

=== December ===
- On December 3, Quelle Chris and Jean Grae got engaged.

== Released albums ==
=== January ===
Day	Artist(s)	Album	Record label(s)	Entering chart position
4	Pink Guy	Pink Season	Pink Records	Debuted at No. 76 on the US Billboard 200
6	Jipsta	Ban2oozle	Bandoozle Beatz	
6	No Limit Boys	We All We Got	No Limit Forever Records	
6	Substantial	The Past Is Always Present in the Future	Hipnott Records	
8	Stitches	Cocaine Holiday	Self released	
12	Bones	Disgrace	TeamSESH	
13	Chief Keef	Two Zero One Seven	Glory Boyz Entertainment, RBC Records	
13	PnB Rock	GTTM: Going Thru the Motions	Atlantic Records, Empire Distribution	Debuted at No. 28 on the US Billboard 200
13	Social Club Misfits	The Misadventures of Fern & Marty	Capitol CMG	Debuted at No. 80 on the US Billboard 200
13	TriState & Oh No	3 Dimensional Prescriptions	Hieroglyphics Imperium Recordings	
13	Wiley	Godfather	Self-released	Debuted at No. 9 on the UK Official Albums Chart
13	Yukmouth	JJ Based on a Vill Story	Smoke-a-Lot Records, EMPIRE	
18	Alex Wiley & Mike Gao	Village Party III: Stoner Symphony	Self-released	
20	Cardi B	Gangsta Bitch Music, Vol. 2	KSR Group	
20	Dyme-A-Duzin	Ghetto Olympics	Focus Or Fold Music	
20	Fredo Santana	Plugged In	RBC Records	
20	Loyle Carner	Yesterday's Gone	Virgin EMI Records	
20	Problem	Chachiville	Diamond Lane Music Group	
20	Prodigy	Hegelian Dialectic (The Book of Revelation)	Infamous Records	
27	Agallah & Duke WestLake	3-Day Theory	The Order Label	
27	Boldy James	The Art of Rock Climbing	Mass Appeal Records	
27	Eric Biddines	The Local Cafe	Juggernaut Sound Productions, Empire Distribution	
27	M-Dot	Ego and the Enemy	Own Lane Music	
27	Matt Martians	The Drum Chord Theory	Three Quarter	
27	Migos	Culture	Quality Control Music, 300 Entertainment	Debuted at No. 1 on the US Billboard 200
27	Mozzy	Fake Famous	Mozzy Records, Empire Distribution	
27	New Gen	New Gen	XL Recordings	Debuted at No. 98 on the UK Official Albums Chart
27	P.O.S	Chill, Dummy	Doomtree Records	
27	Bang Belushi	Help Yourself	Self-released	
27	Twiztid	The Continuous Evilution of Life's ?'s	Majik Ninja Entertainment	Debuted at No. 28 on the US Billboard 200
28	Bishop Nehru	Nehruvia	Nehruvia LLC	
29	Bishop Nehru	Strictly Flowz	Nehruvia LLC	
30	Riff Raff & DJ Afterthought	Aquaberry Aquarius	Neon Nation Corporation, Empire Distribution	
31	Denmark Vessey x Azarias x DRXQUINNX	Doppelganger	Ether Jung	

=== February ===
Day	Artist(s)	Album	Record label(s)	Entering chart position
3	Big Sean	I Decided.	GOOD Music, Def Jam Recordings	Debuted at No. 1 on the US Billboard 200
3	Iamsu!	Boss Up	Eyes on Me	
3	Lil Reese	Better Days	RBC Records	
3	Kirk Knight	Black Noise	Pro Era Records, Cinematic Music Group	
3	Paul Wall & C Stone	Diamond Boyz	Paul Wall Music	
3	Slim Thug	Welcome 2 Houston	Hogg Life Entertainment, SoSouth Music	
3	Swifty McVay	Grey Blood	Arsonal Vision Entertainment	
3	Syd	Fin	The Internet, Columbia Records, Sony Music	Debuted at No. 75 on the US Billboard 200
3	Wyclef Jean	J'ouvert	Heads Music, Entertainment One Music	Debuted at No. 117 on the US Billboard 200
3	Young Dolph	Gelato	Paper Route Empire	Debuted at No. 54 on the US Billboard 200
7	Planet Asia	Velour Portraits	Sovanna Yun	
10	Ces Cru	Catastrophic Event Specialists	Strange Music	Debuted at No. 150 on the US Billboard 200
10	Clyde Carson	S.T.S.A. 2 (Something to Speak About)	Moe Doe Entertainment, Empire Distribution	
10	Devlin	The Devil In	Devlin Music	Debuted at No. 16 on the UK Official Albums Chart
10	Fly Guy Entertainment	No Surrender, No Retreat	Fly Guy Entertainment	
10	Larry June	Larry Two	Warner Bros. Records	
10	Lupe Fiasco	Drogas Light	1st & 15th Entertainment	Debuted at No. 28 on the US Billboard 200
10	Mr. Criminal	Palm Trees and Sunsets	Crime Family Entertainment	
10	Nines	One Foot Out	XL Recordings	Debuted at No. 4 on the UK Official Albums Chart
10	Quelle Chris	Being You Is Great, I Wish I Could Be You More Often	Mello Music Group	
10	Siya	Commitment	R&B Money LLC	
10	Thundamentals	Everyone We Know	High Depth, Island Records Australia, Universal Music Australia	Debuted at No. 2 on the ARIA Australian Top 50 Albums
10	Two-9	FRVR	Ear Drummers Entertainment, Interscope Records	
10	Westside Gunn	Riots on Fashion Avenue	Effiscienz, Modular	
12	Ralo	Famerican Gangster II	Famerica Records	
13	Lucky Luciano	2017 Reasons	GT Digital	
14	Mickey Avalon	Teardrops on My Tombstone	R.E.A.L. Records	
14	Moneybagg Yo	Heartless	Be Great Music Group	Debuted at No. 181 on the US Billboard 200
14	Tef Poe	Black Julian	Footklan Music Group, Stretched Out Management	
16	Starlito	Manifest Destiny	Grind Hard Records	
17	Celly Cel	Dirty Mind	Realside Records	
17	Fat Joe & Remy Ma	Plata O Plomo	RNG, Empire Distribution	Debuted at No. 44 on the US Billboard 200
17	Future	Future	A1 Recordings, Freebandz, Epic Records	Debuted at No. 1 on the US Billboard 200
17	Jidenna	The Chief	Epic Records, Sony Music	Debuted at No. 38 on the US Billboard 200
17	Jonwayne	Rap Album Two	Authors Recording Company, The Order Label	
17	Saga & Thelonious Martin	Molotov	Saga 718, Empire Distribution	
21	Paper Tiger	In Other Words: Part Three	Doomtree Records	
21	Roc Marciano	Rosebudd's Revenge	Marci Enterprises	
21	Wise Intelligent	TheBlueKluxKlan	Self-released	
22	Berner & Blaze1	Packboys	Blaze One Records	
22	Boldy James	House of Blues	Mass Appeal Records	
24	Future	Hndrxx	A1 Recordings, Freebandz, Epic Records	Debuted at No. 1 on the US Billboard 200
24	Horrorshow	Bardo State	Elefant Traks	Debuted at No. 4 on the ARIA Australian Top 50 Albums
24	Karriem Riggins	Headnod Suite	Stones Throw Records	
24	Messy Marv	Still Marked for Death: Vol. 1 (Recorded Live from Prison)	Champland LLC	
24	Mr. Capone-E	Gangster Love	Hi-Power Entertainment	
24	Nav	Nav	XO Records, Republic Records	Debuted at No. 24 on the US Billboard 200
24	Oddisee	The Iceberg	Mello Music Group	
24	Stormzy	Gang Signs & Prayer	Merky Records	Debuted at No. 1 on the UK Official Albums Chart
24	Taelor Gray	In The Way of Me	Self-released	
24	Taylor Bennett	Restoration of an American Idol	Tay Bennett Entertainment	
24	THEY.	Nü Religion: Hyena	Mind of a Genius Records, Warner Bros. Records	
25	Theory Hazit	I See What You Did There	Wet Music	
28	Code Kunst	Muggles' Mansion	Highgrnd	Debuted at No. 26 on the Gaon Album Chart
28	Onry Ozzborn	C V P ii D	Self-released	

=== March ===
Day	Artist(s)	Album	Record label(s)	Entering chart position
1	Lil Durk	Love Songs for the Streets	Only The Family Entertainment	
3	Delinquent Habits	It Could Be Round Two	Self-released	
3	Lil Debbie	XXIII	Barong Family	
3	Nnamdi Ogbonnay	Drool	Sooper Records, Father/Daughter Records	
3	Various artists	Def Jam Presents: Direct Deposit, Vol. 2	Def Jam Recordings	Debuted at No. 145 on the US Billboard 200
7	Hurricane Chris	King Cane	CD Enterprise	
7	Positive K & Greg Nice	Gr8te Mindz	Brainbust	
8	Chris Webby	Webster's Laboratory II	Eighty HD	
8	K Camp	Kiss 4	Family Ties Entertainment, 4.27 Music Group	
8	Lil Bibby	FC3 The Epilogue	Kemosabe Records	
10	Asher Roth, Nottz Raw & Travis Barker	Rawther	RetroHash	
10	Devin the Dude	Acoustic Levitation	Coughee Brothaz Enterprise, Empire Distribution	
10	J.I.D	The Never Story	Dreamville Records, Interscope Records	Debuted at No. 197 on the US Billboard 200
10	Mod Sun	Movie	Rostrum Records	
10	Murs	Captain California	Strange Music	
10	Page Kennedy	Torn Pages	Kennedy Entertainment	
10	Trinidad James & Various artists	The Force	Gold Gang Records	
10	Young Chris	The Network 4	Nicetown Entertainment	
10	Your Old Droog	Packs	Droog Recordings, Fat Beats Records	
14	Impxct	One of a Kind	SremmLife Crew Records	
14	Smino	Blkswn	Zero Fatigue, Downtown Records	
15	Starlito & Don Trip	Step Brothers Three	Grind Hard LLC, Empire Distribution	Debuted at No. 189 on the US Billboard 200
17	The Alchemist	Rapper's Best Friend 4: An Instrumental Series	Self-released	
17	Apathy	Dive Medicine, Chapter 1	Dirty Version Records	
17	Fredo	Get Rich or Get Recalled	Cake + Custard	Debuted at No. 77 on the UK Official Albums Chart
17	G Herbo	Welcome to Fazoland 1.5	Machine Entertainment Group, 150 Dream Team	
17	Pitbull	Climate Change	RCA Records	Debuted at No. 29 on the US Billboard 200
17	Rick Ross	Rather You Than Me	Maybach Music Group, Epic Records	Debuted at No. 3 on the US Billboard 200
18	Big Mike	State of Mind	Self-released	
18	Drake	More Life	Young Money Entertainment, Cash Money Records, Republic Records	Debuted at No. 1 on the US Billboard 200
24	Boondox	The Murder	Majik Ninja Entertainment	Debuted at No. 74 on the US Billboard 200
24	Chuuwee	Paradiso	Below System Records	
24	Daye Jack	No Data	Warner Bros. Records	
24	GoldLink	At What Cost	RCA Records	Debuted at No. 145 on the US Billboard 200
24	Juice	Post Interview	Self-released	
24	Mansionz	Mansionz	Bear Trap, Monster Mountain, Island Records	Debuted at No. 67 on the US Billboard 200
24	Mike WiLL Made It	Ransom 2	EarDrummers Records, Interscope Records	Debuted at No. 24 on the US Billboard 200
24	Raekwon	The Wild	Ice H2O Records, Empire Distribution	Debuted at No. 88 on the US Billboard 200
24	Shawty Lo	Rico	D4L Records, 300 Entertainment	
24	Troy Ave	Dope Boy Troy	BSB Records	
24	Turk	Numbskull	PAC Sound Productions	
30	Amir Obè	None of The Clocks Work	Def Jam Recordings	
30	J. Stalin	I Don't Sell Dope No Moe	Livewire Records	
31	3D Na'Tee	Songs That Didn't Make The Tape, Vol. 1	Self-released	
31	50 Cent	Best Of	Shady Records, Aftermath Entertainment, Interscope Records	Debuted at No. 135 on the US Billboard 200
31	Body Count	Bloodlust	Century Media	
31	Cupcakke	Queen Elizabitch	Self-released	
31	Freddie Gibbs	You Only Live 2wice	ESGN Records, Empire Distribution	Debuted at No. 124 on the US Billboard 200
31	G-Eazy & DJ Carnage	Step Brothers	RCA Records	Debuted at No. 81 on the US Billboard 200
31	Homeboy Sandman	Veins	Stones Throw Records	
31	Kodak Black	Painting Pictures	Atlantic Records	Debuted at No. 3 on the US Billboard 200
31	Locksmith	Olive Branch	Landmark Entertainment Group	
31	Mr. Envi'	All Nite Grind	Southern Stisles Records	

=== April ===
Day	Artist(s)	Album	Record label(s)	Entering chart position
1	Young Dolph	Bulletproof	Paper Route Empire	Debuted at No. 36 on the US Billboard 200
3	YFN Lucci	Long Live Nut	Think It's A Game Records	Debuted at No. 27 on the US Billboard 200
4	Killa Kyleon	Lorraine Motel	RBC Records	
7	Abstract Rude & DJ Vadim	The Owl's Cry	Keep The Feel Entertainment	
7	Allan Kingdom	Lines	So Cold Records, Empire Distribution	
7	Joey Badass	All-Amerikkkan Badass	Pro Era Records, Cinematic Music Group	Debuted at No. 5 on the US Billboard 200
7	Spit Syndicate	One Good Shirt Had Us All Fly	One Day Entertainment, Inertia Music	Debuted at No. 19 on the ARIA Australian Top 50 Albums
7	Tech N9ne	Dominion	Strange Music, Inc	Debuted at No. 28 on the US Billboard 200
7	Tee Grizzley	My Moment	300 Entertainment	Debuted at No. 44 on the US Billboard 200
13	Jae Millz	Lenox Ave Legend	Ether Boy Records	
14	IshDARR	Four the Better EP	Empire Distribution	
14	Kap G	SupaJefe	Atlantic Records	
14	Kendrick Lamar	Damn	Top Dawg Entertainment, Aftermath Entertainment, Interscope Records	Debuted at No. 1 on the US Billboard 200
14	Nappy Roots	Another 40 Akerz	Not Regular Records	
14	Playboi Carti	Playboi Carti	AWGE, Interscope Records	Debuted at No. 12 on the US Billboard 200
14	The R.O.C.	Digital Voodoo	Majik Ninja Entertainment	
14	Rich Homie Quan	Back to the Basics	RAIS, Motown Records	Debuted at No. 84 on the US Billboard 200
14	Ronald Jenkees	Rhodes Deep	Self-released	
14	Sadistik	Altars	Equal Vision Records	
14	Talib Kweli & Styles P	The Seven	Javotti Media	Debuted at No. 195 on the US Billboard 200
14	Tinie Tempah	Youth	Disturbing London Records, Parlophone Records	Debuted at No. 9 on the UK Official Albums Chart
14	Various artists	The Fate of the Furious: The Album	Atlantic Records	Debuted at No. 10 on the US Billboard 200
17	Troy Ave	NuPac	BSB Records	
20	Bones	Unrendered	TeamSESH	
20	DJ Quik & Problem	Rosecrans	Diamond Lane Music Group, Blake Enterprises	
20	Merkules	Trust Your Gut	Merkules Music	
21	Allday	Speeding	ONETWO Records	Debuted at No. 6 on the ARIA Australian Top 50 Albums
21	Berner	Sleepwalking	Bern One Entertainment	
21	David Dallas	Hood Country Club	Mean As Music	Debuted at No. 10 on the New Zealand Top 40 Albums
21	Iamsu!	Boss Up 2	Eyes On Me LLC	
21	JellyRoll	Addiction Kills	Self-released	
21	Stro	Grade a Frequencies	Grade a Tribe Records	
21	T-Wayne	Forever Rickey	Unauthorized Entertainment, 300 Entertainment	
21	Ruff Ryders	Past Present Future	Ruff Ryders Entertainment	
21	Yukmouth	JJ Based on a Vill Story Two	Smoke-a-Lot Records, EMPIRE	
27	Young M.A	Herstory	M.A. Music, 3D	Debuted at No. 166 on the US Billboard 200
28	Bliss n Eso	Off the Grid	Illusive Sounds	
28	Czarface	First Weapon Drawn	Silver Age	
28	Gorillaz	Humanz	Parlophone Records	Debuted at No. 2 on the UK Official Albums Chart
28	Lady Leshurr	Mode	Sony Music Entertainment	
28	Messy Marv	Still Marked for Death: Vol. 2 (Recorded Live from Prison)	Champland LLC	
28	Nef the Pharaoh	The Chang Project	Sick Wid It Records, Empire Distribution	
28	Wale	Shine	Maybach Music Group, Atlantic Records	Debuted at No. 16 on the US Billboard 200

=== May ===
Day	Artist(s)	Album	Record label(s)	Entering chart position
4	Mr. Criminal	The Crime Family Album	Crime Family Entertainment	
5	Brother Ali	All the Beauty in This Whole Life	Rhymesayers Entertainment	Debuted at No. 125 on the US Billboard 200
5	Ho99o9	United States of Horror	999 Deathkult	
5	Kid Ink	7 Series	RCA Records	
5	Logic	Everybody	Def Jam Recordings	Debuted at No. 1 on the US Billboard 200
5	Organized Noize	Organized Noize	Self-released	
5	Russ	There's Really a Wolf	Russ My Way Incorporated, Columbia Records	Debuted at No. 7 on the US Billboard 200
5	Spose	Good Luck With Your Life	Preposterously Dank Entertainment	
5	Upchurch	Son of the South	Redneck Nation Records	
5	Wrekonize	Into the Further	Strange Music, RBC Records, INgrooves Music Group	
9	KRS-One	The World is Mind	R.A.M.P. Entertainment Agency	
9	Sy Ari Da Kid	2 Soon	Self-released	
12	B.o.B	Ether	Label No Genre, Grand Hustle Records, EMPIRE Distribution	Debuted at No. 179 on the US Billboard 200
12	Ecid	How to Fake Your Own Death	Fill In The Breaks	
12	Gonzoe	Happy Birthday	Blocwize Entertainment	
12	J Hus	Common Sense	Black Butter Limited	
12	Lil Wyte	Drugs	Real Talk Entertainment	
12	Machine Gun Kelly	Bloom	EST 19XX, Bad Boy Records, Interscope Records	Debuted at No. 8 on the US Billboard 200
12	Mistah F.A.B.	Stan Pablo: 4506	Faeva Afta Music	
12	P-Lo	More Than Anything	Empire	
17	Rejjie Snow	The Moon & You	300 Entertainment, Honeymoon	
17	XXXTentacion	Revenge	Bad Vibes Forever, Empire Distribution	Debuted at No. 76 on the US Billboard 200
18	T-Wayne (T-Pain and Lil Wayne)	T-Wayne	Nappy Boy Entertainment, Young Money Entertainment	
19	Collie Buddz	Good Life	Harper Digital Entertainment	
19	David Banner	The God Box	A Banner Vision	Debuted at No. 76 on the US Billboard 200
19	Dorrough	Ride Wit Me	Real Talk Entertainment	
19	Faith Evans & The Notorious B.I.G.	The King & I	Rhino Entertainment	Debuted at No. 65 on the US Billboard 200
19	Snoop Dogg	Neva Left	Doggystyle Records, EMPIRE Distribution	Debuted at No. 54 on the US Billboard 200
19	The Underachievers	Renaissance	The Underachievers, RPM MSC	
19	Willie the Kid	Deutsche Marks	Serious Soundz, Embassy Entertainment	
26	Bryson Tiller	True to Self	RCA Records	Debuted at No. 1 on the US Billboard 200
26	Gorilla Zoe	Don't Feed da Animals 2	Real Talk Entertainment	
26	Gucci Mane	DropTopWop	GUWOP Enterprises, 1017 Brick Squad Records, Atlantic Records	Debuted at No. 12 on the US Billboard 200
26	Lil Yachty	Teenage Emotions	Quality Control, Capitol Records, Motown Records	Debuted at No. 5 on the US Billboard 200
26	Suicideboys	Kill Yourself Part XI: The Kingdom Come Saga	G*59 Records	
26	Suicideboys	Kill Yourself Part XII: The Dark Glacier Saga	G*59 Records	
26	Suicideboys	Kill Yourself Part XIII: The Atlantis Saga	G*59 Records	
26	Suicideboys	Kill Yourself Part XIV: The Vulture Saga	G*59 Records	
26	Suicideboys	Kill Yourself Part XV: The Coast of Ashes Saga	G*59 Records	
27	Master P	Intelligent Hoodlum	No Limit Forever Records	

=== June ===
Day	Artist(s)	Album	Record label(s)	Entering chart position
2	Gensu Dean & Wise Intelligent	Game of Death	Mello Music Group	
2	Kool G Rap	Return of the Don	Clockwork Music, Full Mettle	
2	Mozzy & Gunplay	Dreadlocks & Headshots	Real Talk Entertainment	
2	Stevie Stone	Level Up	Strange Music	
2	Yo Gotti & Mike Will Made It	Gotti Made-It	Self-released	Debuted at No. 85 on the US Billboard 200
8	Vic Mensa	The Manuscript	Roc Nation	
9	Billy Woods	Known Unknowns	Backwoodz Studioz	
9	Ampichino	Back 2 Back	Double F Records	
9	Brockhampton	Saturation	Brockhampton Records, Empire	
9	Gunplay	The Plug	Real Talk Entertainment	
9	Ice Cube	Death Certificate (25th Anniversary Reissue)	Lench Mob Records, Interscope Records	
15	Bones	NoRedeemingQualities	TeamSESH	
16	2 Chainz	Pretty Girls Like Trap Music	Def Jam Recordings	Debuted at No. 2 on the US Billboard 200
16	Big Boi	Boomiverse	Epic Records	Debuted at No. 28 on the US Billboard 200
16	Joyner Lucas	508-507-2209	Atlantic Records	
16	Krayzie Bone & Young Noble	Thug Brothers 2	Real Talk Entertainment	
16	Rich the Kid, Famous Dex & Jay Critch	Rich Forever 3	Rich Forever Music, TBD Records	Debuted at No. 93 on the US Billboard 200
16	Sadat X	The Sum of a Man	Dymond Mine Records	
16	Young Thug	Beautiful Thugger Girls	300 Entertainment, Atlantic Records	Debuted at No. 8 on the US Billboard 200
23	Berner & Styles P	Vibes	Bern One Entertainment	
23	DJ Khaled	Grateful	We the Best Music Group, Epic Records	Debuted at No. 1 on the US Billboard 200
23	Jarren Benton	The Mink Coat Killa LP	Benton Enterprise	
23	Krayzie Bone	Eternal Legend	Real Talk Entertainment	
23	Krayzie Bone & Bizzy Bone	New Waves	Entertainment One Music	Debuted at No. 181 on the US Billboard 200
23	Outlawz	#LastOnezLeft	Outlaw Recordz, Elder Entertainment	
23	Vince Staples	Big Fish Theory	ARTium Recordings, Def Jam Recordings	Debuted at No. 16 on the US Billboard 200
26	Members Only	Members Only, Vol. 3	Bad Vibes Forever, Empire Distribution	
29	Public Enemy	Nothing Is Quick in the Desert	Self-released	
30	Jay-Z	4:44	Roc Nation	Debuted at No. 1 on the US Billboard 200
30	MC Eiht	Which Way Iz West	Year Round Records, Blue Stamp Music	
30	Propaganda	Crooked	Humble Beast Records	
30	Ski Mask the Slump God	YouWillRegret	Victor Victor Worldwide, Republic Records	
30	Young Buck	10 Toes Down	Cashville Records	
30	Z-Ro	No Love Boulevard	1 Deep Entertainment	Debuted at No. 135 on the US Billboard 200

=== July ===
Day	Artist(s)	Album	Record label(s)	Entering chart position
5	Lil Wayne	In Tune We Trust	Young Money Entertainment	
7	21 Savage	Issa Album	Slaughter Gang, Epic Records	Debuted at No. 2 on the US Billboard 200
7	The Doppelgangaz	Dopp Hopp	Groggy Pack Entertainment	
7	Twista	Crook County	GMG Entertainment, Empire Distribution	
14	Agallah Don Bishop	Agnum Opus	The Order Label	
14	French Montana	Jungle Rules	Bad Boy Records, Epic Records	Debuted at No. 3 on the US Billboard 200
14	Shabazz Palaces	Quazarz: Born on a Gangster Star	Sub Pop	
14	Shabazz Palaces	Quazarz vs. The Jealous Machines	Sub Pop	
21	Dizzee Rascal	Raskit	Dirtee Stank Recordings, Island Records	
21	Meek Mill	Wins & Losses	Maybach Music Group, Atlantic Records	Debuted at No. 3 on the US Billboard 200
21	Nav & Metro Boomin	Perfect Timing	Boominati Worldwide, XO Records, Republic Records	Debuted at No. 13 on the US Billboard 200
21	Nyck Caution & Kirk Knight	Nyck @ Knight	Pro Era Records, Cinematic Music Group	
21	Sage the Gemini	Morse Code	Global Gemini, Atlantic Records	
21	Skyzoo	Peddler Themes	First Generation Rich, Empire Distribution	
21	Trae tha Truth	Tha Truth, Pt. 3	ABN Entertainment, Empire Distribution	
21	Tyga	Bitch I'm the Shit 2	Last Kings Music, Empire Distribution	Debuted at No. 139 on the US Billboard 200
21	Tyler, The Creator	Flower Boy	Columbia Records	Debuted at No. 2 on the US Billboard 200
28	Aminé	Good for You	CLBN, Republic Records	Debuted at No. 31 on the US Billboard 200
28	Ampichino	Chasin Chicken	Double F Records	
28	Madchild	The Darkest Hour	Battle Axe Records	
28	The Perceptionists	Resolution	Mello Music Group	
28	Stalley	New Wave	Real Talk Entertainment	
28	Tanya Morgan	YGWY$4	Tanya Morgan Music	
28	Vic Mensa	The Autobiography	Roc Nation	Debuted at No. 27 on the US Billboard 200

=== August ===
Day	Artist(s)	Album	Record label(s)	Entering chart position
4	Andy Mineo & Wordsplayed	Andy Mineo and Wordsplayed Present Magic & Bird	Reach Records	Debuted at No. 49 on the US Billboard 200
4	ASAP Twelvyy	12	RCA Records	Debuted at No. 148 on the US Billboard 200
4	Riff Raff	The White West	Neon Nation, Empire Distribution	
4	Ugly God	The Booty Tape	Asylum Records	Debuted at No. 27 on the US Billboard 200
8	Sean Price	Imperius Rex	Ruck Down Records, Duck Down Music	Debuted at No. 192 on the US Billboard 200
11	Dizzy Wright	The Golden Age 2	Self-released	
11	Fashawn	Manna	Mass Appeal Records	
11	Milo	Who Told You to Think??!!?!?!?!	Ruby Yacht, The Order Label	
11	Wordsworth & Sam Brown	Our World Today	Wordsworth Production	
15	Lil Peep	Come Over When You're Sober, Pt. 1	Warner Music Sweden	
18	A$AP Ferg	Still Striving	RCA Records	Debuted at No. 12 on the US Billboard 200
18	Dave East	Paranoia: A True Story	Mass Appeal Records, Def Jam Recordings	Debuted at No. 9 on the US Billboard 200
18	Declaime	Young Spirit	SomeOthaShip Connect, eOne Music	
18	Mozzy	1 Up Top Ahk	Mozzy Records, Empire Distribution	Debuted at No. 68 on the US Billboard 200
18	No Malice	Let the Dead Bury the Dead	Reinvision	
18	Phora	Yours Truly Forever	Warner Bros. Records	Debuted at No. 44 on the US Billboard 200
21	Ace Hood	Trust the Process	Hood Nation	
21	Ganxsta NIP	Souljaz Only	Psych Ward, SoSouth	
25	Action Bronson	Blue Chips 7000	Vice Records, Atlantic Records	Debuted at No. 53 on the US Billboard 200
25	Apollo Brown & Planet Asia	Anchovies	Mello Music Group	
25	A$AP Mob	Cozy Tapes Vol. 2: Too Cozy	ASAP Worldwide, Polo Grounds Music, RCA Records	Debuted at No. 6 on the US Billboard 200
25	Berner & Young Dolph	Tracking Numbers	Bern One Entertainment	
25	Brockhampton	Saturation II	Brockhampton Records, Empire Distribution	Debuted at No. 57 on the US Billboard 200
25	Grieves	Running Wild	Rhymesayers Entertainment	
25	Lil Uzi Vert	Luv Is Rage 2	Generation Now, Atlantic Records	Debuted at No. 1 on the US Billboard 200
25	MadeinTYO	True's World	Private Club, Commission Music	
25	XXXTentacion	17	Bad Vibes Forever, Empire Distribution	Debuted at No. 2 on the US Billboard 200
25	Wiki	No Mountains in Manhattan	XL Recordings	

=== September ===
Day	Artist(s)	Album	Record label(s)	Entering chart position
1	Audio Push	Last Lights Left	Good Vibe Tribe	
1	C-Bo	The Problem	West Coast Mafia, RBC Records	
1	EarthGang	Rags	Spillage Village	
1	Gonzoe	Tha Code	Blocwize Entertainment, Rapbay, Urbanlife	
1	Odd Ralph	The Pink Tape	Self-released	
1	Triple Threat (Twiztid & Blaze Ya Dead Homie)	Triple Threat	Majik Ninja Entertainment	
1	K-Rino & DLP	Rapz 'n' Beatz	Shakboyz Publishing	
5	Ghostemane	Hexada		
8	¡Mayday!	Search Party	Strange Music	
8	Project Pat	M.O.B.	Cleopatra Records	
11	Suicideboys	Kill Yourself Part XVI: The Faded Stains Saga	G*59 Records	
11	Suicideboys	Kill Yourself Part XVII: The Suburban Sacrifice Saga	G*59 Records	
11	Suicideboys	Kill Yourself Part XVIII: The Fall of Idols Saga	G*59 Records	
11	Suicideboys	Kill Yourself Part XIX: The Deep End Saga	G*59 Records	
11	Suicideboys	Kill Yourself Part XX: The Infinity Saga	G*59 Records	
15	Denmark Vessey & Azarias	Buy Muy Drugs	Ether Jung	
15	The Cool Kids	Special Edition Grandmaster Deluxe	Propelr Music	
15	Lil Wyte	Liquor	Real Talk Entertainment	
15	Open Mike Eagle	Brick Body Kids Still Daydream	Mello Music Group	
15	Prophets of Rage	Prophets of Rage	Fantasy Records, Caroline International	Debuted at No. 16 on the US Billboard 200
15	Wyclef Jean	Carnival III: The Fall and Rise of a Refugee	Heads Music, Sony Music, Legacy Recordings	Debuted at No. 112 on the US Billboard 200
18	Juicy J	Highly Intoxicated	Taylor Gang Entertainment	
22	Apathy & O.C.	Perestroika	Dirty Version Records	
22	DJ Kay Slay	The Big Brother	StreetSweepers Entertainment, Empire Distribution	
22	Gorilla Zoe	Gorilla Warfare	Real Talk Entertainment	
22	G Herbo	Humble Beast	Machine Entertainment Group, 150 Dream Team, Cinematic Music Group, RED Distribution	Debuted at No. 21 on the US Billboard 200
22	Kevin Gates	By Any Means 2	Bread Winners' Association, Atlantic Records	Debuted at No. 100 on the US Billboard 200
22	Lecrae	All Things Work Together	Reach Records, Columbia Records	Debuted at No. 11 on the US Billboard 200
22	Macklemore	Gemini	Bendo	Debuted at No. 2 on the US Billboard 200
22	Rapsody	Laila's Wisdom	Jamla Records, Roc Nation	Debuted at No. 125 on the US Billboard 200
22	Rock	Rockness A.P.	Digital Deja Vu Records	
22	Ruste Juxx	International Juxx	Self-released	
22	Young Thug & Carnage	Young Martha	YSL, 300 Entertainment, Heavyweight	
28	Bones	Failure	TeamSESH	
29	A Boogie wit da Hoodie	The Bigger Artist	Highbridge, Atlantic Records	Debuted at No. 4 on the US Billboard 200
29	Gunplay	Haram	Real Talk Entertainment	
29	Hoodie Allen	The Hype	Self-released	Debuted at No. 166 on the US Billboard 200
29	Masta Killa	Loyalty Is Royalty	Nature Sounds	
29	PMD	Business Mentality	RBC Records	
29	Rittz	Last Call	Strange Music	Debuted at No. 43 on the US Billboard 200
29	Smokepurpp	Deadstar	Interscope, Alamo Records, Cactus Jack	Debuted at No. 42 on the US Billboard 200
29	Abdul Mack and K-Rino	Funk Out the Bag	Funk Mack Entertainment	

=== October ===
	Artist(s)	Album	Record label(s)	Entering chart position
6	Belly	Mumble Rap	XO, Roc Nation, Republic	
6	CunninLynguists	Rose Azura Njano	APOS, RBC Records	
6	Dame D.O.L.L.A.	Confirmed	Front Page Music	
6	Ed O.G.	Freedom	5th & Union	
6	Krayzie Bone & Young Noble	Thug Brothers 3	Real Talk Entertainment	
6	Lil Pump	Lil Pump	Warner Bros.	Debuted at No. 3 on the US Billboard 200
6	NF	Perception	NF Real Music, Capitol Records	Debuted at No. 1 on the US Billboard 200
6	Slaine & Termanology	Anti-Hero	ST. Records, Brick Records	
13	Camp Lo	The Get Down Brothers	Vodka & Milk 2	
13	Danny Diablo	The Crackson Heights Project	Force 5 Records	
13	Gucci Mane	Mr. Davis	Atlantic Records	Debuted at No. 2 on the US Billboard 200
13	Hustle Gang	We Want Smoke	Grand Hustle Records, Roc Nation	
13	Krayzie Bone	E.1999: The LeathaFace Project	Real Talk Entertainment	
13	Tech N9ne Collabos	Strange Reign	Strange Music	Debuted at No. 61 on the US Billboard 200
13	Wretch 32	FR32	Polydor Records	
13	Wu-Tang Clan	The Saga Continues	36 Chambers, Entertainment One	Debuted at No. 15 on the US Billboard 200
20	Blu & Exile	In the Beginning: Before the Heavens	Dirty Science, Fat Beats Records	
20	EarthGang	Robots	Spillage Village	
20	Future & Young Thug	Super Slimey	Epic Records, 300 Entertainment, Atlantic Records	Debuted at No. 2 on the US Billboard 200
20	Krept and Konan	7 Days	Virgin EMI	
20	Krept and Konan	7 Nights	Virgin EMI	
20	Rob $tone	Don't Wait for It	Grove Town Records	
20	Stalley	Another Level	Real Talk Entertainment	
20	Young Dolph	Thinking Out Loud	Paper Route Empire	
27	Big K.R.I.T.	4eva Is a Mighty Long Time	Multi Alumni, BMG Rights Management	Debuted at No. 7 on the US Billboard 200
27	Defari	Rare Poise	Self-released	
27	Heavy Metal Kings	Black God White Devil	Enemy Soil Records, Uncle Howie Records	
27	Lil Wop	Wopavelli 3	1017 Eskimo	
27	Overdoz	2008	Polo Grounds Music, RCA Records	
27	Snoop Dogg	Make America Crip Again	Doggystyle Records, Empire Distribution	
27	Ty Dolla Sign	Beach House 3	Atlantic Records	
27	Yelawolf	Trial by Fire	Slumerican, Shady Records, Interscope Records	Debuted at No. 42 on the US Billboard 200
27	Yo Gotti	I Still Am	Epic Records	Debuted at No. 6 on the US Billboard 200
30	King Gordy & Jimmy Donn	How to Gag a Maggot	Sicfux Entertainment	
30	L.A.R.S. (Bizarre & King Gordy)	Foul World	Majik Ninja Entertainment	
31	21 Savage, Offset and Metro Boomin	Without Warning	Slaughter Gang, Epic Records, Quality Control Music, Motown. Capitol Records, Boominati Worldwide, Republic Records	Debuted at No. 4 on the US Billboard 200
31	Chris Brown	Heartbreak on a Full Moon	RCA Records	Debuted at No. 3 on the US Billboard 200
31	Lex "The Hex" Master	Beyond Redemption	Majik Ninja Entertainment	

=== November ===
Day	Artist(s)	Album	Record label(s)	Entering chart position
3	Aha Gazelle	Trilliam 3	Reach Records	
3	Problem	Selfish	Diamond Lane Music Group, EMPIRE Distribution	
7	88Glam	88Glam	XO, Republic	
10	Kerser	Engraved in the Game	ABK, Warner Music Australia	Debuted at No. 5 on the ARIA Australian Top 50 Albums
10	Wiz Khalifa	Laugh Now, Fly Later	Atlantic Records	
10	Yung Lean	Stranger	YEAR0001	
10	2 Chainz	Tyti Boi	Dundridge Entertainment / Unlimited Business	
17	Cyhi the Prynce	No Dope on Sundays	GOOD Music, Sony Music	Debuted at No. 65 on the US Billboard 200
17	PnB Rock	Catch These Vibes	Atlantic Records	Debuted at No. 17 on the US Billboard 200
17	T-Pain	OBLiViON	Nappy Boy Entertainment, RCA Records	Debuted at No. 155 on the US Billboard 200
17	Jaden Smith	Syre	MSFTSMusic, Roc Nation	Debuted at No. 24 on the US Billboard 200
17	Talib Kweli	Radio Silence	Javotti Media, 3D	
17	Stalley	Tell The Truth: Shame The Devil	Blue Collar Gang	
17	Young Noble & Deuce Deuce	For My People	Concrete Enterprises	
24	Fabolous and Jadakiss	Friday on Elm Street	Def Jam Records	Debuted at No. 10 on the US Billboard 200
24	Hopsin	No Shame	Undercover Prodigy, 300 Entertainment	Debuted at No. 42 on the US Billboard 200
24	Half-a-Mil (Dom Kennedy & Hit-Boy)	Courtesy of a Half-A-Mil	Half-A-Mil	
24	Dizzy Wright	State of Mind 2	Still Movin' Records, EMPIRE Distribution	
24	Futuristic	What More Could You Ask for?	Self-released	

=== December ===
Day	Artist(s)	Album	Record label(s)	Entering chart position
1	Chief Keef	Dedication	RBC Records	
1	Majik Ninja Entertainment	Twiztid Presents: Year of the Sword	Majik Ninja Entertainment, INgrooves Music Group	Debuted at No. 81 on the US Billboard 200
1	Roy Woods	Say Less	OVO Sound, Warner Bros. Records	
1	Young Buck	10 Street Commandments	Cashville Records	
1	Z-Ro	Codeine	1 Deep Entertainment, Empire Distribution	
8	Big Sean & Metro Boomin	Double or Nothing	GOOD Music, Def Jam Recordings, Boominati Worldwide, Republic Records	Debuted at No. 6 on the US Billboard 200
8	Juicy J	Rubba Band Business	Kemosabe Records, Columbia Records, Taylor Gang Records	Debuted at No. 191 on the US Billboard 200
8	Quality Control	Control the Streets Volume 1	Quality Control Music, Motown Records, Capitol Records, Universal Music Group	Debuted at No. 5 on the US Billboard 200
8	Statik Selektah	8	Duck Down Music Inc., Showoff Records	
8	Tee Grizzley & Lil Durk	Bloodas	Facemob BMG Rights Management	Debuted at No. 96 on the US Billboard 200
15	Boosie Badazz	BooPac	Atlantic Records, Trill Entertainment	Debuted at No. 38 on the US Billboard 200
15	Scarface	Deeply Rooted: The Lost Files	Facemob, BMG Rights Management	
15	Eminem	Revival	Aftermath Entertainment, Shady Records, Interscope Records, Goliath Artists	Debuted at No. 1 on the US Billboard 200
15	G-Eazy	The Beautiful & Damned	RCA Records	Debuted at No. 3 on the US Billboard 200
15	Jeezy	Pressure	CTE World, Def Jam Recordings	Debuted at No. 6 on the US Billboard 200
15	N.E.R.D	No One Ever Really Dies	I Am Other, Columbia Records	Debuted at No. 31 on the US Billboard 200
15	RJ & DJ Mustard	The Ghetto	10 Summers, Interscope Records	
15	Slim Thug	The World Is Yours	Hogg Life	
15	Brockhampton	Saturation III	Question Everything, Inc, EMPIRE Distribution	Debuted at No. 15 on the US Billboard 200
19	Drastiko and K-Rino	Throughout Time	Gutterlife Records	
20	Chris Webby	Wednesday	EightyHD	
21	Huncho Jack	Huncho Jack, Jack Huncho	Quality Control Music, Cactus Jack Records, Motown Records, Grand Hustle Records, Capitol Records, Epic Records	Debuted at No. 3 on the US Billboard 200
22	Gucci Mane	El Gato: The Human Glacier	GUWOP Enterprises, 1017 Brick Squad Records, Atlantic Records	Debuted at No. 28 on the US Billboard 200
25	Lil Wayne	Dedication 6	Young Money Entertainment	

== Highest-charting singles ==
=== United States ===
Hip hop singles which charted in the Top 40 of the Billboard Hot 100
Song	Artist	Project	Peak position
"Bad and Boujee"	Migos featuring Lil Uzi Vert	Culture	1
"Bodak Yellow"	Cardi B	Invasion of Privacy	1
"I'm the One"	DJ Khaled featuring Justin Bieber, Quavo, Chance the Rapper and Lil Wayne	Grateful	1
"Humble"	Kendrick Lamar	Damn	1
"Rockstar"	Post Malone featuring 21 Savage	Beerbongs & Bentleys	1
"Wild Thoughts"	DJ Khaled featuring Rihanna and Bryson Tiller	Grateful	2
"1-800-273-8255"	Logic featuring Alessia Cara and Khalid	Everybody	3
"Gucci Gang"	Lil Pump	Lil Pump	3
"Unforgettable"	French Montana featuring Swae Lee	Jungle Rules	3
"Bad Things"	Machine Gun Kelly and Camila Cabello	bloom	4
"DNA"	Kendrick Lamar	Damn	4
"iSpy"	KYLE featuring Lil Yachty	Light of Mine	4
"Mask Off"	Future	FUTURE	5
"Bounce Back"	Big Sean	I Decided.	6
"MotorSport"	Migos, Nicki Minaj and Cardi B	Culture II	6
"Tunnel Vision"	Kodak Black	Painting Pictures	6
"XO Tour Llif3"	Lil Uzi Vert	Luv Is Rage 2	7
"Congratulations"	Post Malone featuring Quavo	Stoney	8
"Fake Love"	Drake	More Life	8
"Passionfruit"	Drake	More Life	8
"Rake It Up"	Yo Gotti featuring Nicki Minaj	Gotti Made-It	8
"Portland"	Drake featuring Quavo and Travis Scott	More Life	9
"Caroline"	Aminé	Good For You	11
"I Get the Bag"	Gucci Mane featuring Migos	Mr. Davis	11
"Bank Account"	21 Savage	Issa Album	12
"Gummo"	6ix9ine	Day69	12
"Redbone"	Childish Gambino	Awaken, My Love!	12
"Loyalty"	Kendrick Lamar featuring Rihanna	Damn	14
"No Frauds"	Nicki Minaj, Drake and Lil Wayne	—N/a	14
"Walk on Water"	Eminem featuring Beyoncé	Revival	14
"Element"	Kendrick Lamar	Damn	16
"Free Smoke"	Drake	More Life	18
"T-Shirt"	Migos	Culture	19
"Rolex"	Ayo & Teo	—N/a	20
"No Favors"	Big Sean featuring Eminem	I Decided.	22
"The Heart Part 4"	Kendrick Lamar	—N/a	22
"The Story of O.J."	Jay-Z	4:44	23
"The Way Life Goes"	Lil Uzi Vert featuring Nicki Minaj and Oh Wonder	Luv Is Rage 2	24
"Slide"	Calvin Harris featuring Frank Ocean and Migos	Funk Wav Bounces Vol. 1	25
"Swang"	Rae Sremmurd	SremmLife 2	26
"Chill Bill"	Rob Stone featuring J. Davis and Spooks	Straight Bummin'	29
"Gyalchester"	Drake	More Life	29
"Magnolia"	Playboi Carti	Playboi Carti	29
"Slippery"	Migos featuring Gucci Mane	Culture	29
"Goosebumps"	Travis Scott featuring Kendrick Lamar	Birds in the Trap Sing McKnight	32
"Yah"	Kendrick Lamar	Damn	32
"Everyday We Lit"	YFN Lucci featuring PnB Rock	Long Live Nut	33
"XXX"	Kendrick Lamar featuring U2	Damn	33
"Look At Me!"	XXXTentacion	Revenge	34
"4:44"	Jay-Z	4:44	35
"Feel"	Kendrick Lamar	Damn	35
"Ghostface Killers"	21 Savage, Offset & Metro Boomin featuring Travis Scott	Without Warning	35
"Teenage Fever"	Drake	More Life	35
"X"	21 Savage & Metro Boomin featuring Future	Savage Mode	36
"Sacrifices"	Drake featuring 2 Chainz and Young Thug	More Life	36
"Signs"	Drake	—N/a	36
"Pride"	Kendrick Lamar	Damn	37
"Selfish"	Future featuring Rihanna	HNDRXX	37
"Blem"	Drake	More Life	38
"Drowning"	A Boogie wit da Hoodie featuring Kodak Black	The Bigger Artist	38
"Moves"	Big Sean	I Decided	38
"You da Baddest"	Future featuring Nicki Minaj	HNDRXX	38
"Do Re Mi"	Blackbear featuring Gucci Mane	digital druglord	40
"Party"	Chris Brown featuring Gucci Mane and Usher	Heartbreak on a Full Moon	40
"No Long Talk"	Drake featuring Giggs	More Life	40
"You Was Right"	Lil Uzi Vert	Lil Uzi Vert vs. the World	40

=== United Kingdom ===
Hip hop songs from any year which charted in the 2017 Top 10 of the UK Singles Chart
Song	Artist	Project	Peak position
"Big For Your Boots"	Stormzy	Gang Signs & Prayer	6
"Blinded By Your Grace, Pt. 2"	Stormzy featuring MNEK	Gang Signs & Prayer	7
"Hurtin' Me"	Stefflon Don featuring French Montana	Hurtin' Me - the Ep	7
"Did You See"	J Hus	Common Sense	9
"Bestie"	Yungen featuring Yxng Bane	—N/a	10

== Highest first-week consumption ==
List of albums with the highest first-week consumption (sales + streaming + track equivalent), as of July 2017 in the United States.
Number	Album	Artist	1st-week consumption	1st-week position	Refs
1	Damn	Kendrick Lamar	603,000	1	
2	More Life	Drake	505,000	1	
3	Revival	Eminem	267,000	1	
4	4:44	Jay-Z	262,000	1	
5	Everybody	Logic	247,000	1	
6	I Decided.	Big Sean	151,000	1	
7	Grateful	DJ Khaled	149,000	1	
8	FUTURE	Future	140,000	1	
9	Luv Is Rage 2	Lil Uzi Vert	135,000	1	
10	Culture	Migos	131,000	1	

== All critically reviewed albums ranked ==
=== Metacritic ===
Number	Artist	Album	Average score	Number of reviews	Reference
1	Kendrick Lamar	Damn	95	39 reviews	
2	Vince Staples	Big Fish Theory	89	25 reviews	
3	Rapsody	Laila's Wisdom	87	7 reviews	
4	Sean Price	Imperius Rex	87	4 reviews	
5	J Hus	Common Sense	85	7 reviews	
6	Tyler, The Creator	Flower Boy	84	18 reviews	
7	Wiley	Godfather	84	11 reviews	
8	Loyle Carner	Yesterday's Gone	84	9 reviews	
9	Young Thug	Beautiful Thugger Girls	84	8 reviews	
10	Milo	Who Told You To Think??!!?!?!?!	84	5 reviews	
11	Roc Marciano	Rosebudd's Revenge	83	5 reviews	
12	P.O.S	Chill, Dummy	83	4 reviews	
13	Jay-Z	4:44	82	29 reviews	
14	Stormzy	Gang Signs & Prayer	82	19 reviews	
15	Open Mike Eagle	Brick Body Kids Still Daydream	82	12 reviews	
16	Brockhampton	Saturation III	82	10 reviews	
17	2 Chainz	Pretty Girls Like Trap Music	82	10 reviews	
18	Oddisee	The Iceberg	82	5 reviews	
19	Krept & Konan	7 Days	82	5 reviews	
20	Murs	Captain California	82	4 reviews	
21	Your Old Droog	PACKS	81	4 reviews	
22	Big K.R.I.T.	4eva Is a Mighty Long Time	80	7 reviews	
23	Raekwon	The Wild	80	7 reviews	
24	Brother Ali	All the Beauty in This Whole Life	80	6 reviews	
25	Drake	More Life	79	25 reviews	
26	Migos	Culture	79	18 reviews	
27	Dizzee Rascal	Raskit	78	12 reviews	
28	21 Savage, Offset & Metro Boomin	Without Warning	78	9 reviews	
29	Future	HNDRXX	78	8 reviews	
30	Talib Kweli	Radio Silence	78	6 reviews	
31	Shabazz Palaces	Quazarz: Born on a Gangster Star	77	24 reviews	
32	Shabazz Palaces	Quazarz vs. The Jealous Machines	77	21 reviews	
33	Gucci Mane	Mr. Davis	77	7 reviews	
34	Aminé	Good For You	77	4 reviews	
35	Freddie Gibbs	You Only Live 2wice	76	9 reviews	
36	Action Bronson	Blue Chips 7000	76	6 reviews	
37	Joey Bada$$	ALL-AMERIKKKAN BADA$$	75	15 reviews	
38	Lil Uzi Vert	Luv Is Rage 2	75	8 reviews	
39	Krept & Konan	7 Nights	75	4 reviews	
40	Jidenna	The Chief	73	9 reviews	
41	Gucci Mane	DropTopWop	72	6 reviews	
42	Meek Mill	Wins & Losses	72	4 reviews	
43	Machine Gun Kelly	Bloom	72	4 reviews	
44	Vic Mensa	The Autobiography	71	13 reviews	
45	Rick Ross	Rather You Than Me	71	9 reviews	
46	Public Enemy	Nothing Is Quick in the Desert	71	6 reviews	
47	GoldLink	At What Cost	71	5 reviews	
48	Snoop Dogg	Neva Left	71	5 reviews	
49	Big Boi	Boomiverse	70	13 reviews	
50	21 Savage	Issa Album	70	10 reviews	
51	Tinie Tempah	Youth	70	6 reviews	
52	A$AP Mob	Cozy Tapes Vol. 2: Too Cozy	70	5 reviews	
53	Jaden	Syre	69	6 reviews	
54	Playboi Carti	Playboi Carti	69	5 reviews	
55	French Montana	Jungle Rules	68	8 reviews	
56	Future	FUTURE	67	15 reviews	
57	Big Sean	I Decided	67	13 reviews	
58	Huncho Jack	Huncho Jack, Jack Huncho	66	6 reviews	
59	Future & Young Thug	Super Slimey	66	5 reviews	
60	Jeezy	Pressure	66	5 reviews	
61	Fat Joe & Remy Ma	Plata O Plomo	66	4 reviews	
62	Logic	Everybody	65	7 reviews	
63	A$AP Ferg	Still Striving	65	6 reviews	
64	Wale	Shine	65	5 reviews	
65	Wu-Tang Clan	The Saga Continues	64	16 reviews	
66	Pitbull	Climate Change	64	5 reviews	
67	Lil Yachty	Teenage Emotions	63	15 reviews	
68	Yung Lean	Stranger	63	13 reviews	
69	Macklemore	Gemini	63	8 reviews	
70	DJ Khaled	Grateful	61	11 reviews	
71	Wretch 32	FR32	61	4 reviews	
72	G-Eazy	The Beautiful & Damned	59	5 reviews	
73	Juicy J	Rubba Band Business	59	4 reviews	
74	Lupe Fiasco	Drogas Light	56	11 reviews	
75	Big Sean & Metro Boomin	Double or Nothing	54	4 reviews	
76	Eminem	Revival	50	24 reviews	
77	NAV	NAV	45	5 reviews	

=== AnyDecentMusic? ===
Number	Artist	Album	Average score	Number of reviews	Reference
1	Run the Jewels	Run the Jewels 3	8.5	33 reviews	
2	Vince Staples	Big Fish Theory	8.2	26 reviews	
3	Wiley	Godfather	8.0	12 reviews	
4	Tyler, the Creator	Flower Boy	7.9	18 reviews	
5	Young Thug	Beautiful Thugger Girls	7.8	8 reviews	

== See also ==
- Previous article: 2016 in hip-hop
- Next article: 2018 in hip-hop
