= D Rose (song) =

Single by Lil Pump

Single by Lil Pump

from the album Lil Pump
- Released: June 9, 2017
- Genre: Hip hop
- Length: 2:15
- Label: Tha Lights Global; Warner
- Songwriters: Gazzy Garcia; Jaeqwan Sanders
- Producer: Terrotuga

Lil Pump singles chronology
"Flex Like Ouu" (2017)	"D Rose" (2017)	"Molly" (2017)

Music video
- "D Rose" on YouTube

"D Rose" is a song by American rapper Lil Pump, and the third single from his self-titled debut album (2017). It was released on June 9, 2017 through SoundCloud along with his song "Flex Like Ouu", after a music video directed by Cole Bennett was previously released on January 30, 2017. The song is named after basketball player Derrick Rose. Along with his songs "Boss" and "Gucci Gang", the song helped Lil Pump gain attention, amassing over 30 million plays on SoundCloud.

== Critical reception ==
Paul Thompson of Complex wrote, "'D Rose' is appropriately dreamlike, but the beat does most of the heavy lifting, with Pump's vocals punching in left and right and feeling around for a pocket that never quite reveals itself to him."

== Charts ==
Chart (2017)	Peak position
US Bubbling Under Hot 100 (Billboard)	8
US Hot R&B/Hip-Hop Songs (Billboard)	48

== Certifications ==
Region	Certification	Certified units/sales
United States (RIAA)	Platinum	1,000,000^{‡}
^{‡} Sales+streaming figures based on certification alone.
