= Major Seven (record producer) =

American record producer and songwriter (born 1991)

- Born: Omar Walker; July 25, 1991 (age 35)
- Origin: Atlanta, Georgia, U.S.
- Genres: Hip-hop; R&B; reggae; dancehall
- Occupations: Record producer; songwriter; musician
- Years active: 2013–present

Omar Walker (born July 25, 1991), known professionally as Major Seven, is an American record producer, songwriter, and recording artist. He first gained recognition for producing "The Devil Is a Lie", the lead single from Rick Ross's 2014 album Mastermind, featuring Jay-Z. He has since produced for artists including Future, Rihanna, DJ Khaled, DJ Snake, Rapsody, GloRilla, Burna Boy, and T.I. His production work appears on Keznamdi's Blxxd & Fyah, which won the Grammy Award for Best Reggae Album at the 68th Annual Grammy Awards in 2026, and on three other Grammy-nominated albums.

== Early life ==
Walker was born on July 25, 1991, in Atlanta, Georgia, to Jamaican parents, and was partly raised in Jamaica, where he began rapping and freestyling during his school years. He started producing in FL Studio after making his first beat while helping a girlfriend write an R&B song, and continued developing his production skills while attending college.

== Career ==
=== 2013–2016: "The Devil Is a Lie" ===
Walker's first placement came in 2013 on a T-Pain mixtape. Later that year he produced the track that became "The Devil Is a Lie", performed by Rick Ross featuring Jay-Z and released in December 2013 as the lead single from Mastermind. The single peaked at number 86 on the Billboard Hot 100 and number 16 on the Hot Rap Songs chart, and was certified gold by the Recording Industry Association of America (RIAA).

The song's release was followed by a public dispute over its production credit. After producer K.E. on the Track posted a video depicting himself making the beat, Walker stated in interviews with XXL and Hypebeast that he had created the track and emailed it to K.E. on the Track months earlier for feedback. Walker has said that R&B singer Keith Sweat, an early mentor, supported him during the dispute.

=== 2017–2023: Future, DJ Khaled, and DJ Snake ===
In 2017, Walker produced three tracks on Future's album Hndrxx — "Selfish" featuring Rihanna, "Fresh Air", and "Neva Missa Lost" — working alongside producers including Detail and Mantra. In the XXL interview, Walker said the "Selfish" instrumental began as an idea from Mantra that he developed before sending it to Detail, and that he did not know Rihanna would appear on the record. Hndrxx debuted at number one on the Billboard 200, and "Selfish" peaked at number 37 on the Billboard Hot 100 and was certified platinum by the RIAA.

Walker produced "Holy Mountain", featuring Buju Banton, Sizzla, Mavado and 070 Shake, the opening track of DJ Khaled's 2019 album Father of Asahd, which debuted at number two on the Billboard 200 and was certified platinum. The same year he co-produced "Smile" featuring Bryson Tiller on DJ Snake's album Carte Blanche. In 2021, Walker co-wrote DJ Snake's single "SG" with Ozuna, Megan Thee Stallion and Lisa of Blackpink, which topped the Billboard Latin Airplay chart.

=== 2024–present: Grammy recognition and reggae fusion ===
In 2024, Walker produced four tracks on Rapsody's album Please Don't Cry — "Back in My Bag", "Never Enough", "Faith", and the "Please Don't Cry Interlude" featuring Phylicia Rashad. That October, "Rain Down on Me" — GloRilla's collaboration with Kirk Franklin, Maverick City Music, Kierra Sheard and Chandler Moore, which Walker co-produced — debuted at number one on Billboard's Hot Gospel Songs chart.

Walker has increasingly focused on blending hip-hop with the reggae and dancehall music of his Jamaican heritage, releasing collaborations with dancehall artists including Prince Swanny and Chronic Law, and producing "What Do I Know (Just a Girl)" by Shenseea and Nora Fatehi. He also records as a billed artist: in July 2025 he released the five-track Outside EP with Trinidadian dancehall artist Prince Swanny through Vas Productions — including the single "Liff Up" — following their earlier collaboration "Believe", whose video drew more than six million YouTube views. In April 2026, he released "Bun Di Ganja (Remix)" as a co-billed artist with The Lox, Mavado, and Marlon Asher. He is executive-producing a hip-hop/reggae compilation featuring Rapsody, Wyclef Jean, and Mavado, among others, and has estimated his cumulative certified sales at approximately seven million units.

In 2025, Walker produced "Sweet Love" on Burna Boy's album No Sign of Weakness and co-produced "K-Word" featuring Pastor Troy on JID's God Does Like Ugly. At the 68th Annual Grammy Awards in February 2026, those albums were nominated for Best Global Music Album and Best Rap Album respectively, with GloRilla's Glorious also nominated for Best Rap Album. At the same ceremony, Keznamdi's album Blxxd & Fyah — on which Walker produced several tracks, including "Bun Di Ganja (Roots Version)", "Time", and "Pressure" — won the Grammy Award for Best Reggae Album. In June 2026, Walker produced "Ego" featuring the OMG Girlz on T.I.'s album Kill the King.

After Hurricane Melissa struck Jamaica in October 2025, Walker helped organize the Bob and Rita Marley Foundation Relief Fund, a GoFundMe campaign launched with rapper 21 Savage's Leading by Example Foundation, mixed martial artist Aljamain Sterling, and singer Maxi Priest, which raised more than US$270,000 for hurricane relief in Jamaica; the campaign's organizers credited Walker with "bringing this all together and making this campaign possible".

== Selected production and songwriting credits ==
Credits adapted from AllMusic and album liner notes.

Year	Song	Artist(s)	Album	Role
2013	"The Devil Is a Lie"	Rick Ross featuring Jay-Z	Mastermind	Producer
2017	"Selfish"	Future featuring Rihanna	Hndrxx	Producer
2017	"Fresh Air"	Future	Hndrxx	Producer
2017	"Neva Missa Lost"	Future	Hndrxx	Producer
2019	"Holy Mountain"	DJ Khaled featuring Buju Banton, Sizzla, Mavado and 070 Shake	Father of Asahd	Producer
2019	"Smile"	DJ Snake featuring Bryson Tiller	Carte Blanche	Producer
2021	"SG"	DJ Snake, Ozuna, Megan Thee Stallion and Lisa	Single	Songwriter
2024	"Back in My Bag"	Rapsody	Please Don't Cry	Producer
2024	"Never Enough"	Rapsody featuring Keznamdi and Nicole Bus	Please Don't Cry	Producer
2024	"Faith"	Rapsody featuring Mantragold	Please Don't Cry	Producer
2024	"Rain Down on Me"	GloRilla, Kirk Franklin and Maverick City Music featuring Kierra Sheard and Chandler Moore	Glorious	Producer
2025	"Sweet Love"	Burna Boy	No Sign of Weakness	Producer
2025	"K-Word"	JID featuring Pastor Troy	God Does Like Ugly	Producer
2025	"Bun Di Ganja (Roots Version)"	Keznamdi, Mavado, Marlon Asher and Major Seven	Blxxd & Fyah	Producer, featured artist
2025	"Pressure"	Keznamdi	Blxxd & Fyah	Producer
2025	"Liff Up"	Prince Swanny and Major Seven	Outside EP	Producer, artist
2026	"Bun Di Ganja (Remix)"	The Lox, Major Seven, Mavado and Marlon Asher	Single	Artist
2026	"Ego"	T.I. featuring the OMG Girlz	Kill the King	Producer
