= Tone It Down =

Single by Gucci Mane featuring Chris Brown

from the album Mr. Davis
- Released: June 20, 2017
- Genre: Hip-hop; trap
- Length: 3:41
- Label: GUWOP; 1017; Atlantic
- Songwriters: Radric Davis; Chris Brown; Carl McCormick; Christian Ward; Xavier Dotson; Floyd Bentley; Danny Snodgrass; Melvin Moore
- Producers: Hitmaka; Cardiak; A1; Taz Taylor; JRHitmaker

Gucci Mane singles chronology
| "Down" (2017) | "Tone It Down" (2017) | "Fetish" (2017) |

Chris Brown singles chronology
| "African Bad Gyal" (2017) | "Tone It Down" (2017) | "Pie" (2017) |

"Tone It Down" is a song by American rapper Gucci Mane featuring American singer Chris Brown. Produced by Cardiak, A1, and Hitmaka, it was released on June 20, 2017 as the lead single from Mane's album Mr. Davis (2017).

== Background ==
"Tone It Down" was released about a month after he dropped the commercial mixtape Droptopwop. Mane and Brown had collaborated on previous releases like Brown's hit single "Party" co-starring Usher, Mane's b-side "MoonWalk" co-starring Akon, and "Ms. Breezy" off Brown's 2010 mixtape In My Zone 2.

== Composition ==
The song is based on a flute-driven production from Cardiak and Hitmaka. Lyrically, the track has Gucci demanding those around him to take his actions seriously and humble themselves, hence the title. "Hold up lil homie tone it down / 'Cause the jewelry that you're rockin' is for kids / I'm a grown up," the rapper insists in his first verse.

== Critical reception ==
AllMusic praised the song for being "the best combination of rap bravado and vocal soul".

== Music video ==
The music video was released August 6, 2017.

== Charts ==
| Chart (2017) | Peak position |
|---|---|
| US Bubbling Under Hot 100 Singles (Billboard) | 16 |
| US Bubbling Under R&B/Hip-Hop Singles (Billboard) | 2 |
| US R&B/Hip-Hop Airplay (Billboard) | 24 |

== Certifications ==
| Region | Certification | Certified units/sales |
|---|---|---|
| New Zealand (RMNZ) | Gold | 15,000^{‡} |
| United States (RIAA) | Gold | 500,000^{‡} |
^{‡} Sales+streaming figures based on certification alone.

== Release history ==
| Region | Date | Format | Label | Ref. |
|---|---|---|---|---|
| United States | June 20, 2017 | Digital download | 1017; Atlantic | |
| United States | July 24, 2017 | Urban Contemporary radio | 1017; Atlantic | |
