= El Gato: The Human Glacier =

Mixtape by Gucci Mane
- Released: December 22, 2017
- Recorded: 2017
- Genres: Hip-hop; trap
- Length: 30:39
- Labels: GUWOP; Atlantic
- Producers: Gucci Mane (exec.); Jake One; Southside

Gucci Mane chronology
Mr. Davis (2017)	El Gato: The Human Glacier (2017)	Evil Genius (2018)

El Gato: The Human Glacier is a commercial mixtape by American rapper Gucci Mane. It was released on December 22, 2017, by GUWOP Enterprises and Atlantic Records. The album's production is handed primarily by Southside, alongside Jake One. It is Gucci Mane's third commercial project of 2017, following Droptopwop and Mr. Davis.

== Background ==
Shortly after the release of Mr. Davis, Gucci Mane announced his next project along with its title on October 24, 2017. The mixtape was recorded in just two days, according to Gucci Mane.

On December 11, 2017, he unveiled the project's release date. The following day, the project's tracklist was revealed, however two tracks were cut from the mixtape before release.

== Critical reception ==
Professional ratings
Review scores
Source	Rating
AllMusic	3/5 stars
HipHopDX	3.5/5
Pitchfork	7.3/10
Salute Magazine	4/5 stars

Upon release, El Gato: The Human Glacier received generally favourable reviews by music critics. Marcus Blackwell of HipHopDX praised the album's production, stating that "Upon the sturdy album’s completion, you are left wanting a few more moments of introspection from Gucci. He showed flashes on a handful of verses but never really committed the way he has on previous albums, but this is to be expected for an album he’s stated was recorded in two days. Gucci also doesn’t give us his Grade-A street philosophizing on El Gato: The Human Glacier but he sounds more comfortable than he’s been at any point since his return from prison."

Jonah Bromwich of Pitchfork praised the album's comedic tone and production, stating: "There’s not a miss among the beats here, and even Southside’s stranger choices reveal themselves as fitting backdrops for Gucci’s pop instincts. When stable, Gucci easily approaches the realm of genius, consistently building hype for each new product. It’s no wonder that Gato, a platonic version of one of his early street mixtapes, has been able to stoke as much interest as the more commercial records he’s released lately. As Gucci has entered this new period of his life, he’s accomplished an extraordinary amount. It’s not gauche or even suspect to hope and pray that he keeps it up."

Adrian Glover of Salute Magazine commented that El Gato: The Human Glacier "finds Gucci Mane at his best as he redefines his style. In the past he’s been either really street or damn near too comical as he ran through ad-lib after ad-lib. Now, he’s found a way to talk his shit without allowing one section of his arsenal to overshadow the other. That could partially be because this one was helmed by one singular producer who saw the process through from beginning to end."

== Track listing ==
Credits adapted from Tidal.

No.	Title	Writer(s)	Producer(s)	Length
1.	"Rich Ass Junkie"	Radric Davis; Joshua Luellen	Southside	3:12
2.	"Peepin Out the Blinds"	Davis; Luellen	Southside	3:05
3.	"Dickriders"	Davis; Luellen	Southside	3:10
4.	"Mall"	Davis; Luellen	Southside	4:47
5.	"Side EFX"	Davis; Luellen; Jacob Dutton	Southside; Jake One	2:24
6.	"TYT"	Davis; Luellen; Dutton	Southside; Jake One	3:27
7.	"Sea Sick"	Davis; Luellen	Southside	3:18
8.	"Smiling in the Drought"	Davis; Luellen	Southside	4:09
9.	"El Gato's Revenge"	Davis; Luellen	Southside	4:51
10.	"Strep Throat"	Davis; Luellen	Southside	4:01
11.	"Southside and Guwop (Outro)"	Davis; Luellen; Dutton	Southside; Jake One	4:16
Total length:				30:39

== Charts ==
Chart (2017–2018)	Peak position
Canadian Albums (Billboard)	61
Latvian Albums (LaIPA)	75
Dutch Albums (Album Top 100)	96
US Billboard 200	28
