= Pie (song) =

Single by Future featuring Chris Brown

from the album Hndrxx
- Released: June 25, 2017
- Genre: R&B; pop
- Length: 3:31
- Label: Epic; Sony
- Songwriters: Nayvadius Wilburn; Christopher Brown
- Producers: Detail; D. A. Doman

Future singles chronology
"Rollin" (2017)	"Pie" (2017)	"Extra Luv" (2017)

Chris Brown singles chronology
"Tone It Down" (2017)	"Pie" (2017)	"Pills & Automobiles" (2017)

Music video
- "Pie" on YouTube

"Pie" is a song by American rapper Future featuring American singer Chris Brown. Written alongside producers Detail and D. A. Doman, it was released on June 25, 2017, as the second single from the former's sixth studio album, Hndrxx (2017).

== Background ==
Initially, "Pie" was not included on HNDRXX, but later Future decided to add it on to an updated version of the album, as the 18th track. Future announced the song at the BET Awards when he was asked about new music.

== Music video ==
The music video was uploaded to Future's Vevo channel on YouTube on June 25, 2017, along with the song's release. Directed by Nick Walker, the video features Future and Brown "hang[ing] out on a tennis court, chilling by a swimming pool and ordering takeaway at a fancy mansion party."

As of November 2024, the music video on YouTube currently has 71 Million views.

== Track listing ==
Digital download
No.	Title	Length
1.	"Pie" (featuring Chris Brown)	3:40

== Charts ==
Chart (2017)	Peak position
Canada Hot 100 (Billboard)	78
New Zealand Heatseekers (RMNZ)	6
UK Singles (Official Charts)	92
US Bubbling Under Hot 100 (Billboard)	2
US Hot R&B/Hip-Hop Songs (Billboard)	48

== Certifications ==
Certifications for "Pie "
Region	Certification	Certified units/sales
Canada (Music Canada)	Gold	40,000^{‡}
New Zealand (RMNZ)	Platinum	30,000^{‡}
United States (RIAA)	Gold	500,000^{‡}
^{‡} Sales+streaming figures based on certification alone.

== Release history ==
Region	Date	Format	Label	Ref.
Worldwide	June 25, 2017	Digital download	Epic; Syco	
