= Curve (song) =

2017 song by Gucci Mane featuring The Weeknd

Promotional single by Gucci Mane featuring The Weeknd

from the album Mr. Davis
- Released: September 13, 2017
- Genre: Trap
- Length: 2:41
- Label: GUWOP; Atlantic
- Songwriters: Radric Davis; Abel Tesfaye; Navraj Goraya; Sugar-Ray Henry
- Producers: Nav; FrostADX

Music video
- "Curve" on YouTube

"Curve" is a song by American rapper Gucci Mane featuring Canadian singer the Weeknd. Written alongside producers Nav and FrostADX, it was released on September 13, 2017, as a promotional single from Mane's eleventh studio album Mr. Davis (2017).

== Background ==
Gucci Mane premiered the song on Beats 1 on September 13, 2017, as a promotional single for his album Mr. Davis. He told Zane Lowe, "I'm a huge fan and I respect the Weeknd and whole team of XO. We exchanged numbers and started build a rapport with each other. And we were bouncing off records; I'll send him records, he'll send me beats. And then one day he sent me this record that NAV produced. It was like an early birthday gift or Christmas present."

== Composition ==
The song has been described as "hypnotic" and is about the artists' "playboy lifestyles". The Weeknd performs the first verse and chorus, singing about charming women and briefly spending time with them "before curving with no mercy". Gucci Mane raps about his high reputation enthralling women in the second verse.

== Music video ==
The official music video premiered on GQ on November 10, 2017. Directed by David Helman, the video is in black-and-white and sees Gucci Mane and The Weeknd in a grim alley. Throughout the video, the camera angle slowly twists and turns, revealing multiple clones of the artists singing and dancing.

== Charts ==
| Chart (2017) | Peak position |
|---|---|
| Australia (ARIA) | 93 |
| Canada Hot 100 (Billboard) | 40 |
| UK Singles (OCC) | 78 |
| US Billboard Hot 100 | 67 |
| US Hot R&B/Hip-Hop Songs (Billboard) | 28 |

== Certifications ==
| Region | Certification | Certified units/sales |
|---|---|---|
| United States (RIAA) | Platinum | 1,000,000^{‡} |
^{‡} Sales+streaming figures based on certification alone.
