= Bighead (music producer) =

American record producer, songwriter, DJ

BigHead
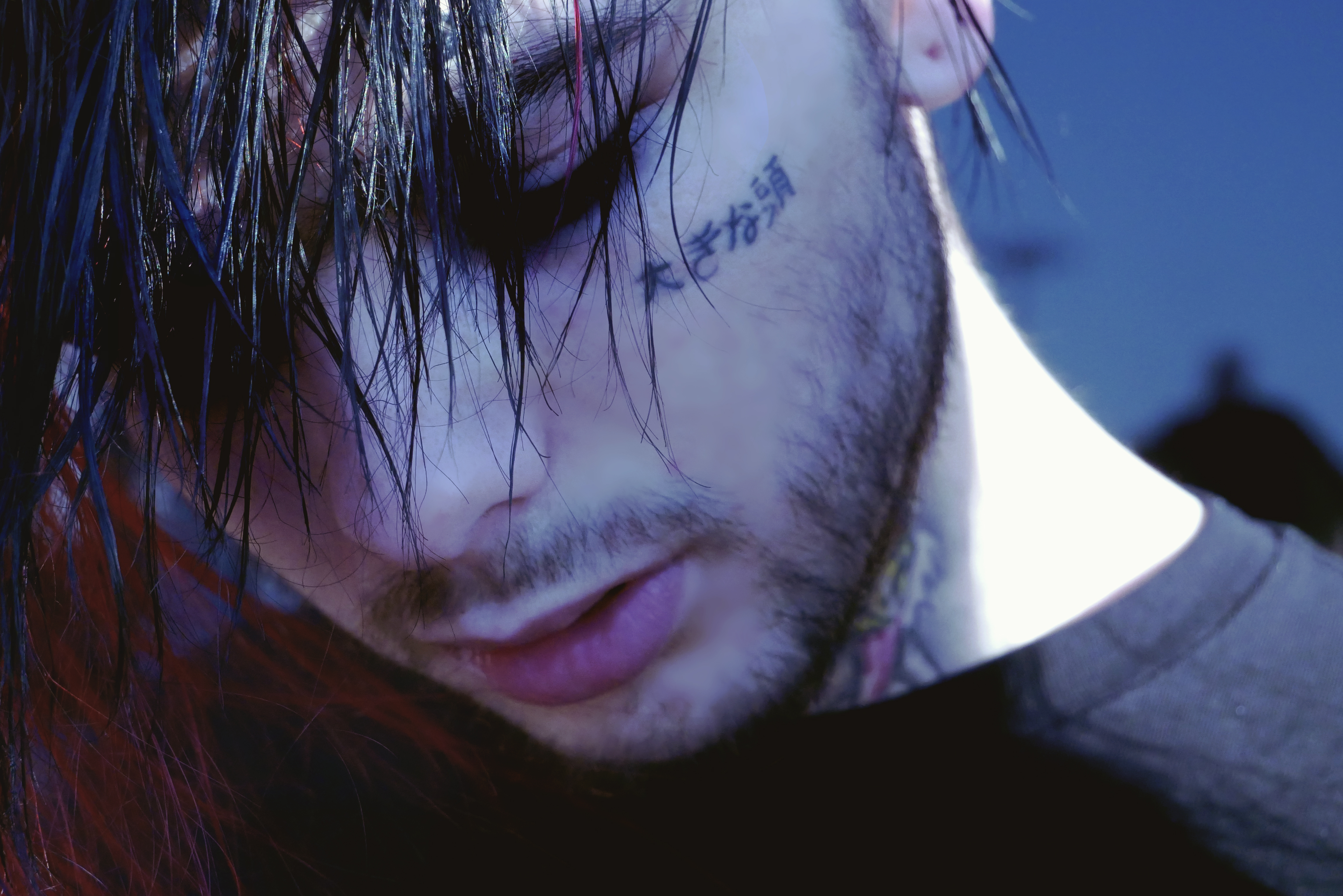
- BigHead in 2018

Background information
- Also known as: BigHead on the Beat
- Born: Brenden Patrick Murray; August 13, 1995 (age 31); Palmdale, California, U.S.
- Genres: Hip hop; trap; emo rap; SoundCloud rap
- Occupations: Record producer; songwriter; DJ
- Instrument: FL Studio
- Years active: 2010–present

Brenden Patrick Murray (born August 13, 1995), known professionally as BigHead or BigHead on the Beat, is an American record producer, songwriter and DJ. He is best known for his work in the SoundCloud rap genre. He has produced music for, and performed with, artists such as Lil Pump, Lil Tracy, Famous Dex, YoungBoy Never Broke Again and Lil Peep.

He was named in XXL's list of the 30 best hip hop producers of 2017, adding "You can't listen to this year's rising rap stars without hearing music from BigHead".

== Early life ==
Brenden Patrick Murray was born on August 13, 1995, in Palmdale, California. When he was 17, he noticed that many producers of songs that he listened to used FL Studio. Inspired by this, he downloaded FL Studio on his mother's computer and quickly became obsessed with making beats on it. He became a full-time record producer at the age of 18 after his father moved to Arkansas. He grew up in Palmdale and Lancaster.

== Career ==
He initially made beats in the style of Meek Mill and Drake before in 2017 beginning to compose in his own way, "probably 'cause I was high". He first made the top 10 of the Billboard Hot 100 with Lil Pump's "Gucci Gang" that year. He produced six tracks on Pump's self-titled album that year. One of those songs, "Molly", was co-produced with Ronny J.

=== Artistry ===
Bighead has spoken of his inspiration from Blink-182, whom he considers made the Billboard chart with simple compositions: "if a three-year-old or a four-year-old can sing it, that's what I aim for. Like "Gucci Gang"".
