= 7 Days (mixtape) =

Mixtape by Krept and Konan
- Released: 20 October 2017
- Recorded: 2016–17
- Genre: British hip hop; trap
- Length: 45:40
- Label: Virgin EMI
- Producer: 5ive; Adotskitz; EY; Levi Lennox; Rachet; RasEye; Swifta Beater; Yamaica Productions

Krept and Konan chronology
The Long Way Home (2015)	7 Days (2017)	7 Nights (2017)

Singles from 7 Days
- 1. "Wo Wo Wo" Released: 29 September 2017

7 Days is the fourth mixtape by British rap duo Krept and Konan. It is part of a dual-release alongside 7 Nights, released on 20 October 2017 by Virgin EMI. The mixtape includes guest appearances from Skepta, Abra Cadabra, J Hus and Stormzy. It was supported by the lead single "Wo Wo Wo".

== Singles ==
The lead single "Wo Wo Wo" was released on 29 September 2017 for streaming and digital download. It peaked at number 71 on the UK Singles Chart.

== Track listing ==
7 Days
No.	Title	Writer(s)	Producer(s)	Length
1.	"Champions League"	Casyo Johnson; Karl Wilson; Omari Woolley	Swifta Beater	4:32
2.	"Told You"	Johnson; Wilson; Eyobed Getachew; Fateh Rahman	EY; Adotskitz	2:32
3.	"Wo Wo Wo"	Johnson; Wilson; Getachew	EY	3:31
4.	"On My Life" (featuring Skepta)	Johnson; Wilson; Rahman; Joseph Adenuga	Adotskitz	4:22
5.	"Robbery (Remix)" (with Abra Cadabra)	Johnson; Wilson; Kwame Kwesi; Abdul Nelson	Yamaica Productions	5:27
6.	"Khalas" (featuring R.A.)	Johnson; Wilson; Rahman; Josee Hylton	Adotskitz	7:43
7.	"Sauce"	Johnson; Wilson; Sadiki Forbes; Rasi Wellington	RasEye; 5ive	4:02
8.	"Cold Summer (Krept Freestyle)"	Johnson; Levi Lennox	Lennox	3:31
9.	"Ask Flipz" (featuring Stormzy)	Johnson; Wilson; Rahman; Laidi Saliasi; Michael Omari	Adotskitz	3:52
10.	"Last Night in LA (Konan Freestyle)"	Wilson; Rahman	Adotskitz	3:09
11.	"Get a Stack" (featuring J Hus)	Johnson; Wilson; Saliasi; Momodou Jallow	Rachet	3:01
Total length:				45:40

== Charts ==
Chart (2017)	Peak position
Scottish Albums (OCC)	64
UK Albums (OCC)	6

== Certifications ==
Region	Certification	Certified units/sales
United Kingdom (BPI)	Silver	60,000^{‡}
^{‡} Sales+streaming figures based on certification alone.
