= You da Baddest =

Single by Future featuring Nicki Minaj

from the album Hndrxx
- Released: July 28, 2017
- Genre: Trap
- Length: 4:05
- Label: A1; Freebandz; Epic
- Songwriters: Nayvadius Wilburn; Onika Maraj; Noel Fisher; Andre Price
- Producers: Go Grizzly; Detail

Future singles chronology
"Incredible" (2017)	"You da Baddest" (2017)	"Real Thing" (2017)

Nicki Minaj singles chronology
"Rake It Up" (2017)	"You da Baddest" (2017)	"You Already Know" (2017)

Music video
- "You da Baddest" on YouTube

"You da Baddest" is a song by the American rapper Future featuring Nicki Minaj. It was released on July 28, 2017, as the fourth single from Future's sixth album, Hndrxx (2017). The song was written by Future and Minaj along with producer Detail and Andre Price, and was produced by Detail and Go Grizzly. Initially, "You da Baddest" was not included on HNDRXX, but later Future added it on to an updated version of the album, as the closing track.

Its music video was filmed in Miami, and released alongside the song.

== Track listing ==
Digital download
No.	Title	Length
1.	"You da Baddest" (featuring Nicki Minaj)	4:05

== Charts ==
Chart (2017)	Peak position
Australia Urban (ARIA)	39
Canada Hot 100 (Billboard)	53
France (SNEP)	95
US Billboard Hot 100	38
US Hot R&B/Hip-Hop Songs (Billboard)	19

== Certifications ==
Region	Certification	Certified units/sales
Canada (Music Canada)	Gold	40,000^{‡}
United States (RIAA)	Platinum	1,000,000^{‡}
^{‡} Sales+streaming figures based on certification alone.

== Release history ==
Region	Date	Format	Label	Ref.
Worldwide	July 28, 2017	Digital download	Epic; Syco	
