= 7 Nights (mixtape) =

Mixtape by Krept and Konan
- Released: 20 October 2017
- Recorded: 2016–17
- Genre: British hip hop; R&B
- Length: 32:55
- Label: Virgin EMI
- Producer: Deputy; EY; Hazard; KRS; Xeryus

Krept and Konan chronology
7 Days (2017)	7 Nights (2017)

Singles from 7 Nights
- 1. "For Me" Released: 29 September 2017

Professional ratings
Aggregate scores
Source	Rating
Metacritic	75/100
Review scores
Source	Rating
Clash	4/10
The Line of Best Fit	8/10

7 Nights is the fifth mixtape by British rap duo Krept and Konan. It is part of a dual-release alongside 7 Days, released on 20 October 2017 by Virgin EMI. The mixtape includes guest appearances from Tory Lanez, Jhené Aiko and Hudson East. It was supported by the lead single "For Me".

== Singles ==
The lead single "For Me" was released on 29 September 2017 for streaming and digital download. It peaked at number 66 on the UK Singles Chart.

== Track listing ==
7 Nights
No.	Title	Writer(s)	Producer(s)	Length
1.	"Don't Lie"	Casyo Johnson; Karl Wilson; Eyobed Getachew	EY	1:34
2.	"For Me"	Johnson; Wilson; Getachew; Alastair O'Donnell	EY	3:41
3.	"Ride for You" (featuring Hudson East)	Johnson; Wilson; Getachew; Aaron Taylor	EY	3:02
4.	"Wrongs" (featuring Jhené Aiko)	Johnson; Wilson; Christopher Allen; Efuru Chilombo	KRS	3:07
5.	"Save Some" (featuring Hudson East)	Johnson; Wilson; Getachew; Taylor	EY	3:30
6.	"So Lit"	Johnson; Wilson; Jamil Pierre	Deputy	3:22
7.	"Same Shit" (featuring Tory Lanez)	Johnson; Wilson; Naseem Shah; Daystar Peterson	Hazard	3:36
8.	"One More Time"	Johnson; Wilson; Getachew; Taylor	EY	3:12
9.	"The One"	Johnson; Wilson; Getachew; Xeryus Gittens; Vania Khaleh-Pari	Xeryus; EY	3:26
10.	"Take Time" (featuring Hudson East)	Johnson; Wilson; Getachew; Joshua Murray	EY	4:12
Total length:				32:55

== Charts ==
Chart (2017)	Peak position
Scottish Albums (OCC)	100
UK Albums (OCC)	8
