= Boss (Lil Pump song) =

Single by Lil Pump

from the album Lil Pump
- Released: June 6, 2017
- Genre: Trap
- Length: 1:46
- Label: Tha Lights Global; Warner
- Songwriters: Lil Pump; Sebastian Baldeon
- Producer: Diablo

Lil Pump singles chronology
"Movin'" (2017)	"Boss" (2017)	"Flex Like Ouu" (2017)

Music video
- "Boss" on YouTube

"Boss" is a song by American rapper Lil Pump, released as the lead single from his debut studio album Lil Pump (2017). It was originally released on Lil Pump's SoundCloud account on April 19, 2017, and later released as a single on June 6, 2017. The song reached number 40 on the US Hot R&B/Hip-Hop Songs chart, and was certified Platinum by the RIAA.

== Charts ==
Chart (2017)	Peak position
Canada Hot 100 (Billboard)	93
US Bubbling Under Hot 100 (Billboard)	1
US Hot R&B/Hip-Hop Songs (Billboard)	40

== Certifications ==
Region	Certification	Certified units/sales
United States (RIAA)	Platinum	1,000,000^{‡}
^{‡} Sales+streaming figures based on certification alone.
