= Lil Pump (album) =

Studio album by Lil Pump
- Released: October 6, 2017
- Recorded: 2017
- Studio: Warner Bros. Studios
- Genres: Hip hop; trap; SoundCloud rap; mumble rap
- Length: 36:41
- Labels: Tha Lights Global; Warner
- Producers: CBMix; Bighead; Captain Crunch; Chester Hansen; Danny Wolf; Diablo; Fadedblackid; Frank Dukes; Gnealz; Illa Da Producer; Matthew Tavares; Mr. 2–17; Ronny J; Terrotuga; TM88; Trapphones

Lil Pump chronology
Lil Pump (2017)	Harverd Dropout (2019)

Singles from Lil Pump
- 1. "Boss" Released: June 6, 2017; 2. "Flex Like Ouu" Released: June 9, 2017; 3. "D Rose" Released: June 9, 2017; 4. "Molly" Released: July 7, 2017; 5. "Gucci Gang" Released: August 31, 2017; 6. "Youngest Flexer" Released: 2017

Lil Pump is the debut studio album by American rapper Lil Pump. It was released through Tha Lights Global and Warner Records on October 6, 2017. The album features guest appearances from rappers Smokepurpp, Lil Yachty, Chief Keef, Gucci Mane, 2 Chainz, and Rick Ross. It also features its production from Bighead, Ronny J, and TM88, among others.

Upon its release, the album was supported by five singles: "Boss", "Flex Like Ouu", "D Rose", "Molly", and "Gucci Gang". The album debuted at number three on the US Billboard 200, with first-week sales of 45,000 album-equivalent units. On July 24, 2018, the album was certified gold by the Recording Industry Association of America (RIAA). A sequel, Lil Pump 2, was released five years later on March 17, 2023.

== Background ==
On May 20, 2017, Lil Pump first announced the album through Twitter. He stated that the project was to be released in August of that year, however, he did not meet this expected due date. While the fans waited for the project, he released the next single, called "Gucci Gang". Just a month later, Pump announced that the album has been completed, along with the release date and cover art several days later.

== Singles ==
On June 6, 2017, Pump released the album's lead single, called "Boss". Upon its release, the song reached at number 40 on the US Hot R&B/Hip-Hop Songs chart, and was certified platinum by the Recording Industry Association of America (RIAA).

On June 9, Pump released the album's third single, called "D Rose". Upon its release, the song helped Pump gain attention, amassing over 30 million plays on SoundCloud.

On August 31, Pump released the album's fifth and final single, called "Gucci Gang". It is Pump's highest-charting single to date on the US Billboard Hot 100, peaking at number three. It has been certified five-times platinum by the Recording Industry Association of America (RIAA).

== Critical reception ==
Professional ratings
Review scores
Source	Rating
Pitchfork	6.9/10
RapReviews	6.5/10
Spectrum Culture	7/10
XXL	L

Lil Pump received generally favorable reviews from critics. XXL rated the album as 'L' and praised it as "a project that confirms its creator's arrival and his place as one of the leading men in the SoundCloud rap scene". It evaluated Lil Pump as a "capable, albeit repetitive rhymer that compensates for what he lacks in terms of depth, structure and variety with unbridled passion, catchy refrains and an ear for enticing production". Evan Rytlewski of Pitchfork gave the album 6.9/10, writing that Lil Pump sounded "completely, endearingly stoked" all the way through the record and calling every track "loud, hyper, and catchy".

== Commercial performance ==
The album debuted at number three on the US Billboard 200, with first-week sales of 45,000 album-equivalent units. On June 21, 2018, the album was certified gold by the Recording Industry Association of America (RIAA) for combined sales album-equivalent units of over half a million units in the United States.

== Track listing ==
Lil Pump track listing
No.	Title	Writer(s)	Producer(s)	Length
1.	"What U Sayin'" (featuring Smokepurpp)	Gazzy Garcia; Omar Pineiro; Travis Broderick, Jr.; David Morales	Fadedblackid; Trapphones^{[a]}	2:20
2.	"Gucci Gang"	Garcia; Brenden Murray; Gerrell Nealy	Bighead; Gnealz	2:04
3.	"Smoke My Dope" (featuring Smokepurpp)	Garcia; Pineiro; Ronald Spence, Jr.	Ronny J	2:15
4.	"Crazy"	Garcia; Murray	Bighead	2:05
5.	"Back" (featuring Lil Yachty)	Garcia; Miles McCollum; Nosakhere Andrews	Mr. 2–17	3:17
6.	"D Rose"	Garcia; Jaeqwan Sanders	Terrotuga	2:15
7.	"At the Door"	Garcia; Murray; Christopher Barnett	Bighead; CBMix	2:03
8.	"Youngest Flexer" (featuring Gucci Mane)	Garcia; Radric Davis; Murray	Bighead	3:19
9.	"Foreign"	Garcia; Bryan Simmons	TM88	1:52
10.	"Whitney" (featuring Chief Keef)	Garcia; Keith Cozart; James Montgomery; Murray	Bighead; Captain Crunch^{[a]}	3:12
11.	"Molly"	Garcia; Murray; Spence	Bighead; Ronny J	2:02
12.	"Iced Out" (featuring 2 Chainz)	Garcia; Tauheed Epps; Andrews	Mr. 2–17	3:12
13.	"Boss"	Garcia; Sebastian Baldeon	Diablo	1:46
14.	"Flex Like Ouu"	Garcia; Miguel Curtidor; Spence; Adam Feeney	Danny Wolf; Ronny J; Frank Dukes^{[a]}; Matthew Tavares^{[b]}; Chester Hansen^{[b]}	1:48
15.	"Pinky Ring" (featuring Smokepurpp and Rick Ross)	Garcia; Pineiro; William Roberts II; Ray Fraser	Illa da Producer	3:12
Total length:				36:41

Notes

- ^{^[a]} signifies a co-producer.
- ^{^[b]} signifies an additional producer.
- "What U Sayin'" was originally titled as What You Gotta Say.

== Personnel ==
Performers

- Lil Pump – primary artist
- Smokepurpp – featured artist (tracks 1, 3, 15)
- Lil Yachty – featured artist (track 5)
- Gucci Mane – featured artist (track 8)
- Chief Keef – featured artist (track 10)
- 2 Chainz – featured artist (track 12)
- Rick Ross – featured artist (track 15)

Technical

- Christopher Barnett – mix engineering (all tracks)
- Josh Goldenberg – record engineering (track 2)

Production

- Fadedblackid – production (track 1)
- Trapphones – co-production (track 1)
- Bighead – production (tracks 2, 4, 7, 8, 10, 11)
- Gnealz – production (track 2)
- Ronny J – production (tracks 3, 11, 14)
- Mr. 2–17 – production (tracks 5, 11)
- Terrotuga – production (track 6)
- CBMix – production (track 7)
- TM88 – production (track 9)
- Captain Crunch – co-production (track 10)
- Diablo – production (track 13)
- Danny Wolf – production (track 14)
- Frank Dukes – co-production (track 14)
- Matthew Tavares – additional production (track 14)
- Chester Hansen – additional production (track 14)
- Illa Da Producer – production (track 15)

== Charts ==
=== Weekly charts ===
Weekly chart performance for Lil Pump
Chart (2017–2018)	Peak position
Belgian Albums (Ultratop Flanders)	80
Belgian Albums (Ultratop Wallonia)	81
Canadian Albums (Billboard)	6
Danish Albums (Hitlisten)	36
Dutch Albums (Album Top 100)	46
Finnish Albums (Suomen virallinen lista)	10
French Albums (SNEP)	67
Italian Albums (FIMI)	19
Latvian Albums (LaIPA)	5
New Zealand Albums (RMNZ)	33
Norwegian Albums (VG-lista)	20
Swedish Albums (Sverigetopplistan)	20
US Billboard 200	3
US Top R&B/Hip-Hop Albums (Billboard)	2

=== Year-end charts ===
Year-end chart performance for Lil Pump
Chart (2017)	Position
US Top R&B/Hip-Hop Albums (Billboard)	64
Chart (2018)	Position
US Billboard 200	104
US Top R&B/Hip-Hop Albums (Billboard)	48

== Certifications ==
Certifications for Lil Pump
Region	Certification	Certified units/sales
Canada (Music Canada)	Gold	40,000^{‡}
France (SNEP)	Gold	50,000^{‡}
New Zealand (RMNZ)	Gold	7,500^{‡}
United States (RIAA)	Gold	500,000^{‡}
^{‡} Sales+streaming figures based on certification alone.
