= Mr. Davis =

Studio album by Gucci Mane
- Released: October 13, 2017
- Genre: Hip-hop; trap
- Length: 61:06
- Label: GUWOP; Atlantic
- Producer: A1; Ben Billions; Cardiak; Chris Bosh; Cubeatz; Danja; Detail; FrostADX; Hitmaka; Honorable C.N.O.T.E.; Key Wane; Metro Boomin; Mike Will Made It; Murda Beatz; Myles Harris; Nav; OG Parker; Rico Love; Southside; TM88; Zaytoven

Gucci Mane chronology
Droptopwop (2017)	Mr. Davis (2017)	El Gato: The Human Glacier (2017)

Alternate cover

Singles from Mr. Davis
- 1. "Make Love" Released: February 23, 2017; 2. "Tone It Down" Released: June 20, 2017; 3. "I Get the Bag" Released: September 5, 2017

Mr. Davis is the eleventh studio album by American rapper Gucci Mane. It was released on October 13, 2017, by GUWOP Enterprises and Atlantic Records. The album is Gucci Mane's second commercial project of the year of 2017, following the Droptopwop mixtape. It features guest appearances from Nicki Minaj, Monica, Chris Brown, Migos, The Weeknd, ASAP Rocky, Big Sean, Ty Dolla Sign, Schoolboy Q, Slim Jxmmi, Young Dolph and Rico Love.

Mr. Davis was supported by three singles: "Make Love", "Tone It Down" and "I Get the Bag". The album charted at number two on the US Billboard 200, and received generally positive reviews from critics.

== Background ==
Gucci Mane announced the album's title, track listing and cover art on August 17, 2017, along with the pre-order.

== Promotion ==
Before the release of Droptopwop (2017), Gucci Mane released the first single to Mr. Davis, "Make Love" with Nicki Minaj, on February 23, 2017. The album's lead single, "Tone It Down" featuring Chris Brown, was released on June 20, 2017.

"I Get the Bag" featuring Migos, was released as a promotional single on August 18, 2017, along with a music video. It was then sent to urban contemporary radio on September 5, 2017, as the album's third single. On September 13, 2017, Gucci Mane released the song, "Curve" featuring The Weeknd, as the album's promotional single.

== Critical reception ==
Professional ratings
Aggregate scores
Source	Rating
Metacritic	77/100
Review scores
Source	Rating
AllMusic	4.5/5 stars
Clash	7/10
The Guardian	3/5 stars
HipHopDX	3.6/5
HotNewHipHop	79%
Pitchfork	7.4/10
XXL	4/5

Mr. Davis was met with generally positive reviews. At Metacritic, which assigns a normalized rating out of 100 to reviews from professional publications, the album received an average score of 77, based on seven reviews.

Neil Z. Yeung of AllMusic gave a positive review, stating "The songs pop, the production is memorable, and the guests weave effortlessly into their respective tracks without detracting from Gucci's signature delivery". Evan Rytlewski of Pitchfork said, "Between this spring's cold, uncompromising Droptopwop and the personable crossover stab of Mr. Davis, Gucci Mane is making his most engaging music since his Trap Back/Trap God resurgence". Scott Glaysher of XXL stated, "Mr. Davis is stripped-down, honest and straight to the point". Ural Garrett of HipHopDX wrote: "The album doesn't move the needle for Guwop's creative progression forward and at times sounds as if it doesn't even aspire to. In a nutshell, Mr. Davis is simply a party celebrating Gucci's personal growth alongside his star-studded friends."

Matthew Cooper of Clash saying "There is plenty of time for Guwop to build upon the formula that already has him winning". In a mixed review, The Guardian's Ben Beaumont-Thomas stated: "With little to no actual wordplay to his boasts, the materialism gets a little wearing."

== Commercial performance ==
Mr. Davis debuted at number two on the US Billboard 200 with 70,000 album-equivalent units, of which 21,000 were pure album sales. It is Gucci Mane's fourth US top 10 album and the second largest debut sales week of his career.

== Track listing ==
Mr. Davis track listing
No.	Title	Writer(s)	Producer(s)	Length
1.	"Work in Progress (Intro)"	Radric Davis; Shane Lindstrom; Kevin Gomringer; Tim Gomringer	Murda Beatz; Cubeatz	2:25
2.	"Back On"	Davis; Xavier Dotson	Zaytoven	3:01
3.	"I Get the Bag" (featuring Migos)	Davis; Quavious Marshall; Kirshnik Ball; Leland Wayne; Joshua Luellen	Metro Boomin; Southside	3:53
4.	"Stunting Ain't Nuthin" (featuring Slim Jxmmi and Young Dolph)	Davis; Aaquil Brown; Adolph Thornton, Jr.; Michael Williams II; Myles Harris	Mike Will Made It; Harris	5:16
5.	"Curve" (featuring The Weeknd)	Davis; Abel Tesfaye; Navraj Goraya; Sugar-Ray Henry	Nav; FrostADX	2:41
6.	"Enormous" (featuring Ty Dolla Sign)	Davis; Tyrone Griffin, Jr.; Joshua Parker; Bryan Simmons; Christian Ward; Floyd Bentley III; Masamune Kudo; Christopher Dotson	OG Parker; TM88	4:04
7.	"Members Only"	Davis; Carlton Mays, Jr.	Honorable C.N.O.T.E.	3:14
8.	"Money Make Ya Handsome"	Davis; Benjamin Diehl	Ben Billions	3:25
9.	"Changed" (featuring Big Sean)	Davis; Sean Anderson; Dwane Weir II	Key Wane	3:52
10.	"We Ride" (featuring Monica)	Davis; Richard Butler, Jr.; Nathaniel Hills; Marcella Araica; Leonardo Underwood	Danja; Rico Love	3:44
11.	"Lil Story" (featuring Schoolboy Q)	Davis; Quincy Hanley; Dwan Avery; Luellen	Southside	2:50
12.	"Tone It Down" (featuring Chris Brown)	Davis; Christopher Brown; Ward; Carl McCormick; Bentley III; Dotson	Cardiak; Hitmaka; A1	3:38
13.	"Make Love" (with Nicki Minaj)	Davis; Onika Maraj; Luellen	Southside	5:00
14.	"Money Piling"	Davis; Simmons; Luellen	TM88	2:56
15.	"Jumped Out the Whip" (featuring ASAP Rocky)	Davis; Rakim Mayers; Wayne; T. Gomringer; K. Gomringer	Metro Boomin; Cubeatz	3:36
16.	"Miss My Woe" (featuring Rico Love)	Davis; Butler; Christopher Bosh; Hills; Araica; Underwood	Rico Love; Chris Bosh; Danja^{[a]}	4:18
17.	"Made It (Outro)"	Davis; Dotson	Zaytoven	3:13
Total length:				61:06

Notes

- ^{^[a]} signifies an additional producer

== Personnel ==
Credits adapted from the album's liner notes and Tidal.

Performers

- Gucci Mane – primary artist
- Migos – featured artist (track 3)
- Slim Jxmmi – featured artist track 4)
- Young Dolph – featured artist (track 4)
- The Weeknd – featured artist (track 5)
- Ty Dolla Sign – featured artist (track 6)
- Big Sean – featured artist (track 9)
- Monica – featured artist (track 10)
- Schoolboy Q – featured artist (track 11)
- Chris Brown – featured artist (track 12)
- Nicki Minaj – featured artist (track 13)
- ASAP Rocky – featured artist (track 15)
- Rico Love – featured artist (track 16)

Technical

- Colin Sing – mastering engineer (all tracks)
- Kori Anders – mixing engineer (tracks 1, 2, 5, 9, 11, 12, 14, 17)
- Eddie "eMIX" Hernàndez – recording engineer (tracks 2, 3, 5, 17)
- Jaycen Joshua – mixing engineer (tracks 12, 13)
- Chad Roper – recording engineer (tracks 10, 16)
- Marcella "Ms Lago" Araica – mixing engineer (track 10)
- Chad Jolley – additional recording engineer (tracks 10, 16)
- Dana Richard – recording engineer (track 16)
- Nathan Burgess – recording engineer (track 16)
- Niko Marzouca – mixing engineer (track 16)
- Robert Marks – mixing engineer (tracks 16)

Production

- Murda Beatz – producer (track 1)
- Cubeatz – producer (track 1)
- Zaytoven – producer (tracks 2, 17)
- Metro Boomin – producer (tracks 3, 15)
- Southside – producer (tracks 3, 11, 13, 15)
- Mike Will Made It – producer (track 4)
- Myles Harris – producer (track 4)
- Nav – producer (track 5)
- Ben Billions – producer (track 8)
- OG Parker – producer (track 6)
- TM88 – producer (tracks 6, 14)
- Key Wane – producer (track 9)
- Danja – producer (track 10), additional producer (track 16)
- Rico Love – producer (track 10)
- Cardiak – producer (track 12)
- Hitmaka – producer (track 12)
- Chris Bosh – producer (track 16)

Additional personnel

- Gucci Mane – executive producer
- Jimmy Fontaine – photography
- Virgilio Tzaj – art direction and design
- Carolyn Tracey – packaging project director
- Shun Melson – styling direction

== Charts ==
=== Weekly charts ===
Chart performance for Mr. Davis
Chart (2017)	Peak position
Australian Albums (ARIA)	49
Belgian Albums (Ultratop Flanders)	93
Belgian Albums (Ultratop Wallonia)	148
Canadian Albums (Billboard)	5
Czech Albums (ČNS IFPI)	67
Dutch Albums (Album Top 100)	41
Finnish Albums (Suomen virallinen lista)	41
French Albums (SNEP)	72
Latvian Albums (LaIPA)	78
Norwegian Albums (VG-lista)	39
UK Albums (OCC)	77
US Billboard 200	2
US Top R&B/Hip-Hop Albums (Billboard)	1

=== Year-end charts ===
2017 year-end chart performance for Mr. Davis
Chart (2017)	Position
US Top R&B/Hip-Hop Albums (Billboard)	65

2018 year-end chart performance for Mr. Davis
Chart (2018)	Position
US Billboard 200	145
US Top R&B/Hip-Hop Albums (Billboard)	69

== Certifications ==
Certifications and sales for Mr. Davis
Region	Certification	Certified units/sales
United States (RIAA)	Platinum	1,000,000^{‡}
^{‡} Sales+streaming figures based on certification alone.
