= Selfish (Future song) =

Single by Future featuring Rihanna

from the album Hndrxx
- Released: February 28, 2017
- Recorded: 2016
- Studio: 11th Street Studios (Atlanta, GA); Circle House Studios (Miami, FL); Westlake Recording Studios (Hollywood, CA)
- Genre: Pop; R&B
- Length: 4:11
- Label: A1; Freebandz; Epic
- Songwriters: Nayvadius Wilburn; Robyn Fenty; Noel Fisher; Omar Walker; Evan Smith
- Producers: Detail; Major Seven; Mantra

Future singles chronology
"Draco" (2017)	"Selfish" (2017)	"No Pressure" (2017)

Rihanna singles chronology
"Love on the Brain" (2016)	"Selfish" (2017)	"Wild Thoughts" (2017)

Licensed audio
- "Selfish" on YouTube

"Selfish" is a song by American Musician Future for his sixth studio album, Hndrxx (2017), featuring Barbadian singer Rihanna, the song was released as the lead single from Hndrxx on February 28, 2017. The track was produced by Detail, Major Seven and Mantra.

== Composition ==
"Selfish" draws influences from the R&B and pop music genres. Future's voice is set with Auto-Tune.

== Charts ==
=== Weekly charts ===
Chart (2017)	Peak position
Australia (ARIA)	37
Australia Urban (ARIA)	3
Belgium (Ultratip Bubbling Under Flanders)	4
Belgium (Ultratip Bubbling Under Wallonia)	18
Canada Hot 100 (Billboard)	28
ERROR in "CIS": Invalid position: 316. Expected number 1–200 or dash (–).
Czech Republic Singles Digital (ČNS IFPI)	36
France (SNEP)	34
Hungary (Stream Top 40)	40
Ireland (IRMA)	78
New Zealand (Recorded Music NZ)	17
Portugal (AFP)	34
Slovakia Singles Digital (ČNS IFPI)	35
Sweden (Sverigetopplistan)	80
Switzerland (Schweizer Hitparade)	51
UK Singles (Official Charts)	94
UK R&B (Official Charts Company)	25
US Billboard Hot 100	37
US Hot R&B/Hip-Hop Songs (Billboard)	15
US Rhythmic Airplay (Billboard)	13

=== Year-end charts ===
Chart (2017)	Position
US Hot R&B/Hip-Hop Songs (Billboard)	85

== Certifications ==
Region	Certification	Certified units/sales
Australia (ARIA)	Platinum	70,000^{‡}
Canada (Music Canada)	2× Platinum	160,000^{‡}
Denmark (IFPI Danmark)	Gold	45,000^{‡}
New Zealand (RMNZ)	2× Platinum	60,000^{‡}
Sweden (GLF)	Gold	20,000^{‡}
United States (RIAA)	Platinum	1,000,000^{‡}
^{‡} Sales+streaming figures based on certification alone.
