= Hndrxx =

Studio album by Future
- Released: February 24, 2017
- Studios: 11th Street; Triangle Sound (Atlanta); Abel's Crib; Chalice; Westlake (Los Angeles); Circle House (Miami)
- Genres: Avant-pop; R&B
- Length: 68:59
- Labels: Freebandz; A1; Epic
- Producers: Cicero; Cirkut; David Nakaji; Detail; DJ Mustard; DJ Spinz; Dre Moon; DY; High Klassified; Ivan Jimenez; Jake One; Kingbnjmn; Major Seven; Mantra; Metro Boomin; Sidney Swift; Southside; The Track Burnaz; Wheezy

Future chronology
Future (2017)	Hndrxx (2017)	Super Slimey (2017)

Singles from Hndrxx
- 1. "Selfish" Released: February 28, 2017; 2. "Pie" Released: June 25, 2017; 3. "Incredible" Released: July 25, 2017; 4. "You da Baddest" Released: July 28, 2017

Hndrxx (pronounced Hendrix) is the sixth studio album by American rapper Future. It was released on February 24, 2017, through A1 Recordings, Freebandz, and Epic Records. It followed the release of Future's eponymously-titled fifth album by one week, and features guest appearances from Rihanna, The Weeknd, Chris Brown, and Nicki Minaj.

Hndrxx was supported by four singles: "Selfish", "Pie", "Incredible", and "You da Baddest". The album received positive critical reviews and charted at number one, making Future the first artist to release two Billboard 200 chart topping albums in consecutive weeks. It was included on lists of 2017's best albums by various publications, including Complex, Pitchfork, Fact, and Entertainment Weekly.

== Background ==
Online music magazine Hits Daily Double announced on February 22, 2017, that Future was set to release another album a week after the eponymously titled album Future (2017), set to include more "rhythmic-leaning and radio-friendly" tracks. The release was first announced by Future during a Q&A on social media on February 21, 2017, along with him tweeting the pre-order link for Hndrxx. The album is also eponymously named after Future's alter ego, Future Hendrix.

== Promotion ==
"Selfish", featuring Barbadian singer Rihanna, was released as the album's lead single on February 28, 2017, the song was produced by Detail, Kuk Harrell, Major Seven, and Mantra. It peaked at number 37 on the US Billboard Hot 100.

"Pie", featuring American singer Chris Brown, was released as the second single on June 25, 2017, the song was produced by D. A. Doman and Detail. It peaked at number 48 on the US Hot R&B/Hip-Hop Songs.

The album's third single, "Incredible", was released to rhythmic contemporary radio on July 25, 2017, the song was produced by Dre Moon. It peaked at number 48 on the Hot R&B/Hip-Hop Songs.

"You da Baddest", featuring Trinidadian-American rapper Nicki Minaj, was released as the album's fourth single on July 28, 2017, the song was produced by Detail and Go Grizz. It peaked at number 38 on the Billboard Hot 100.

== Critical reception ==
Professional ratings
Aggregate scores
Source	Rating
AnyDecentMusic?	7.1/10
Metacritic	78/100
Review scores
Source	Rating
AllMusic	4/5 stars
Consequence	B+
HipHopDX	4.2/5
HotNewHipHop	87%
The Irish Times	3/5 stars
Pitchfork	7.8/10
Q	3/5 stars
Rolling Stone	3.5/5 stars
Spectrum Culture	3.75/5 stars
XXL	4/5

Hndrxx was met with generally positive reviews. At Metacritic, which assigns a normalized rating out of 100 to reviews from professional publications, the album received an average score of 78, based on eight reviews. Aggregator AnyDecentMusic? gave it 7.1 out of 10, based on their assessment of the critical consensus.

Neil Z. Yeung of AllMusic said, "Released just a week after his self-titled fifth effort, Future's HNDRXX provided an introspective and confessional complement to the more extroverted Future". Ural Garrett of HipHopDX said, "HNDRXX provides a view into a modern rock star indulging in a side of himself that's more thoughtful and dare one say, honest". Rebecca Haithcoat of Pitchfork said, "Over a well-played hand of wistful, bright-eyed and reflective beats, HNDRXX strikes a near-perfect balance between a man still licking his wounds and a man emerging from a long, dark night". Preezy of XXL said, "HNDRXX is a reminder that no matter how hard he tries to shun his reputation as a hitmaker, Future remains one of the most reliable acts in mainstream music, his reluctance aside".

Michael Madden of Consequence said, "While his most definitive project remains 2015's Dirty Sprite 2 for its balance of Future's innate melodic sense and especially effective trap records, HNDRXX comes in as a close second". Kristian Brito of The Quietus said, "It's the slickest, spaciest project he's released since Honest (which was always underrated), and sits far left of the trap rigor mortis of the self-titled record". Mosi Reeves of Rolling Stone said, "Like its predecessor, it's an hour-plus data dump of quotidian creativity with a slight thematic focus, not a tightly sequenced tour de force. But Future wouldn't be Future if he wasn't unburdening himself, no matter how messy and polarizing the results might be. And for the most part, he's at his most appealing here".

=== Year-end lists ===
Select year-end rankings of Hndrxx
Publication	List	Rank	Ref.
Billboard	Billboard's 50 Best Albums of 2017	17	
Complex	The Best Albums of 2017	4	
Consequence	Top 50 Albums of 2017	15	
Entertainment Weekly	The 25 Best Albums of 2017	16	
Fact	The 50 best albums of 2017	5	
HipHopDX	HipHopDX's Best Rap Albums of 2017	11	
Noisey	The 100 Best Albums of 2017	12	
Pitchfork	The 50 Best Albums of 2017	27	
Rap-Up	Rap-Up's 20 Best Albums of 2017	15	
Spin	50 Best Albums of 2017	27	

== Commercial performance ==
Hndrxx debuted at number one on the US Billboard 200 with 121,000 album-equivalent units, of which 48,000 were pure album sales. It replaced Future's own self-titled album from the previous week at number one, making him the first artist in the history of the Billboard 200 to have two albums debut at number one in successive weeks. As of July 5, 2017, the album has moved 435,000 album-equivalent units.

== Track listing ==
Hndrxx track listing
No.	Title	Writer(s)	Producer(s)	Length
1.	"My Collection"	Nayvadius Wilburn; Leland Wayne; Kevin Gomringer; Tim Gomringer	Metro Boomin; Cubeatz^{[a]}	4:15
2.	"Comin Out Strong" (featuring the Weeknd)	Wilburn; Abel Tesfaye; Noel Fisher; Henry Walter; Kevin Vincent	Cirkut; David Nakaji; High Klassified; Ivan Jimenez	4:14
3.	"Lookin Exotic"	Wilburn; Kendricke Brown; Andrew Cohen; Jacob Dutton; Joshua Luellen	Jake One; Southside	3:46
4.	"Damage"	Wilburn; Fisher; Te Whiti Warbrick; Dijon McFarlane; Nicholas Audino; Lewis Hughes; William Gaitling^{[c]}; Gene Griffin^{[c]}; Aaron Hall^{[c]}; Teddy Riley^{[c]}	DJ Mustard; Nakaji; Jimenez; Twice as Nice^{[a]}	3:57
5.	"Use Me"	Wilburn; Chazmun Conley; Fisher; Sidney Swift; Justin Bradley; Ruben Raymond; Justin Rodriguez	Detail; Swift; The Track Burnaz	4:16
6.	"Incredible"	Wilburn; Ngandu Kabamba; William Moore; Andre Proctor	Dre Moon	4:08
7.	"Testify"	Wilburn; Moore; Luellen	Southside	2:58
8.	"Fresh Air"	Wilburn; Daniel Mizrahi; Benjahmin Singh-Reynolds; Fisher; Omar Walker	Detail; Kingbnjmn; Major Seven; Mantra	4:30
9.	"Neva Missa Lost"	Wilburn; Xeryus Gittens; Fisher; Walker; Donald DeGrate^{[d]}; Cedric Hailey^{[d]}	Nakaji; Detail; Jimenez; Major Seven	3:58
10.	"Keep Quiet"	Wilburn; Gary Hill; Brown	DJ Spinz; K-Major^{[a]}	3:22
11.	"Hallucinating"	Wilburn; Kabamba; Proctor	Dre Moon	3:41
12.	"I Thank U"	Wilburn; Wesley Glass	Wheezy	2:21
13.	"New Illuminati"	Wilburn; Rahshan Kyles; Dwan Avery	Cicero; DY	3:01
14.	"Turn on Me"	Wilburn; Luellen	Southside	4:24
15.	"Selfish" (featuring Rihanna)	Wilburn; Robyn Fenty; Fisher; Walker	Detail; Major Seven; Mantra; Kuk Harrell^{[b]}	4:11
16.	"Solo"	Wilburn; Proctor	Dre Moon	4:26
17.	"Sorry"	Wilburn; Wayne; K. Gomringer; T. Gomringer	Metro Boomin; Cubeatz^{[a]}	7:31
Total length:				68:59

Streaming / LP Reissue
No.	Title	Writer(s)	Producer(s)	Length
18.	"Pie" (featuring Chris Brown)	Wilburn; Christopher Brown; David Doman; Fisher; Floyd Bentley; Joseph Campion; Matthias Gehler; James Stewart; Justin Thomas; Thomas Klotz	D. A. Doman; Detail	3:31
19.	"You da Baddest" (featuring Nicki Minaj)	Wilburn; Onika Maraj; Fisher; Kevin Price	Detail; Go Grizz	4:01
Total length:				76:31

Notes

- ^{^[a]} signifies a co-producer
- ^{^[b]} signifies a vocal producer

Sample credits

- ^{^[c]} "Damage" contains a portion of "Piece of My Love", written by William Gaitling, Gene Griffin, Aaron Hall, and Teddy Riley, as performed by Guy.
- ^{^[d]} "Neva Missa Lost" contains an interpolation of "My Heart Belongs to U", written by Donald DeGrate and Cedric Hailey, as performed by Jodeci.

== Personnel ==
Credits were adapted from the album's liner notes and Tidal.

Musicians

- Jim Stewart – keyboards (track 18)
- Thomas Klotz – keyboards (track 18)
- Justefan – vibraphone (track 18)

Technical

- Ryan Coplan – assistant engineer (tracks 1, 6, 14, 17)
- Mike Synphony – assistant engineer (tracks 3, 7, 10–13)
- Chris Galland – assistant engineer (tracks 5, 8)
- Jeff Jackson – assistant engineer (tracks 5, 8)
- Robin Florent – assistant engineer (tracks 5, 8)
- Bill Zimmerman – engineer (track 15)
- David Nakaji – assistant engineer (tracks 18–19)
- Ivan Jimenez – assistant engineer (tracks 18–19)
- Nick Valentin – assistant engineer (track 19)

== Charts ==
=== Weekly charts ===
Chart performance for Hndrxx
Chart (2017)	Peak position
Australian Albums (ARIA)	53
Australian Urban Albums (ARIA)	7
Austrian Albums (Ö3 Austria)	58
Belgian Albums (Ultratop Flanders)	66
Belgian Albums (Ultratop Wallonia)	199
Canadian Albums (Billboard)	1
Czech Albums (ČNS IFPI)	19
Danish Albums (Hitlisten)	18
Dutch Albums (Album Top 100)	14
Finnish Albums (Suomen virallinen lista)	49
French Albums (SNEP)	45
German Albums (Offizielle Top 100)	64
New Zealand Albums (RMNZ)	39
Norwegian Albums (VG-lista)	16
Slovak Albums (ČNS IFPI)	31
Swedish Albums (Sverigetopplistan)	24
Swiss Albums (Schweizer Hitparade)	30
UK Albums (Official Charts)	21
US Billboard 200	1
US Top R&B/Hip-Hop Albums (Billboard)	1

=== Year-end charts ===
2017 year-end chart performance for Hndrxx
Chart (2017)	Position
Danish Albums (Hitlisten)	73
US Billboard 200	37
US Top R&B/Hip-Hop Albums (Billboard)	19

== Certifications ==
Certifications for Hndrxx
Region	Certification	Certified units/sales
Canada (Music Canada)	Gold	40,000^{‡}
Denmark (IFPI Danmark)	Gold	10,000^{‡}
New Zealand (RMNZ)	Platinum	15,000^{‡}
United Kingdom (BPI)	Silver	60,000^{‡}
United States (RIAA)	Platinum	1,000,000^{‡}
^{‡} Sales+streaming figures based on certification alone.

== Release history ==
Release dates and formats for Hndrxx
Region	Date	Label(s)	Format(s)	Ref.
Various	February 24, 2017	A1; Freebandz; Epic	Digital download; streaming	
Various	January 12, 2018	A1; Freebandz; Epic	Vinyl	
