= Gucci Gang =

2017 single by Lil Pump

Single by Lil Pump

from the album Lil Pump
- Released: August 30, 2017
- Genre: Hip hop; trap
- Length: 2:04
- Label: Tha Lights Global; Warner Bros.
- Songwriters: Gazzy Garcia; Brenden Murray; Gerrell Nealy
- Producers: Bighead; Gnealz

Lil Pump singles chronology
"Molly" (2017)	"Gucci Gang" (2017)	"Designer" (2017)

Music video
- "Gucci Gang" on YouTube

"Gucci Gang" is a song by American rapper Lil Pump. It is produced by Bighead and co-produced by Gnealz, and is the fifth single from Lil Pump's self-titled debut album. It was originally released on Pump's SoundCloud account on August 28, 2017, and was later made available for digital download and streaming by Tha Lights Global and Warner Bros. Records on August 30, 2017. It is Lil Pump's highest-charting single to date on the US Billboard Hot 100, peaking at number three. It has been certified five-times platinum by the Recording Industry Association of America.

== Background ==
In a November 2017 interview with Complex, producer Bighead spoke of his inspiration from Blink-182, whom he considers to have reached the Billboard charts with simple compositions: "Simple music is good music, because if a three-year-old or a four-year-old can sing it, that's what I aim for. Like 'Gucci Gang'—a little kid can sing that."

== Composition and lyrics ==
In "Gucci Gang", Pump shows off his "signature charismatic, carefree flow" over a trap beat with "booming drums and a hazy piano melody". It is in the key of F major with a tempo of 120 beats per minute.

== Music video ==
On October 21, 2017, Lil Pump posted a 44-second snippet of the music video for "Gucci Gang" on his Twitter page, In which he told his fans to "retweet it if I should drop it right now". He released the video three days later on his YouTube channel on October 23, 2017. As of October 2025, the video has had 1.196 billion views on YouTube.

The video was directed by Ben Griffin of Prime Zero Productions, who was approached by Warner Bros. to direct this video and the one for Lil Pump's 2018 single "Esskeetit". Lil Pump's brief was that the video should include a tiger, a school and a food fight. According to Griffin, the tiger is a media-trained specimen who walked through the corridor alongside Lil Pump, with no computer-generated imagery involved.

The video was filmed at the Blessed Sacrament School in Hollywood, a Catholic elementary school that is the property of the Archdiocese of Los Angeles. The archdiocese stated that the school's administration did not follow the procedure to get its approval for allowing the filming of the video, which includes drug use. Griffin declined to comment when asked by Fox 11 Los Angeles about the matter.

== Critical reception ==
Lee Su-ho of IZM rated the song 2.5 out of 5 stars. According to him, after two minutes of spitting out meaningless lyrics on a dreamy beat, all that is left is an addictive hook that goes "Gucci gang, Gucci gang, Gucci gang, Gucci gang".

Mitch Findlay of HotNewHipHop stated: "there are times where Pump shows moments of evolution." However, "Pump seems hampered by his dependence on substances, and while he may enjoy being a recreational drug user, he’ll never find artistic longevity if they remain his sole lyrical focus."

Jacob Shamsian of Insider included the song on his '13 most overhyped songs of 2017' list and said it was "awful".

=== Year-end lists ===
Publication	List	Rank	Ref.
Complex	50 Best Songs of 2017	47	
Genius	50 Best Songs of 2017	50	
Passion Weiss	50 Best Rap Songs of 2017	50	

== Legacy ==
The song spawned numerous memes on social media. Saturday Night Live aired a music video for a parody, "Tucci Gang", about actor Stanley Tucci, with cast member Pete Davidson portraying Lil Pump. Eminem mimics the song on his 2018 track, "The Ringer" with a view to dissing Pump himself.

In July 2018, actor/musician Drake Bell released a cover of the song.

== Awards and nominations ==
Awards	Year	Category	Result	Ref.
Billboard Music Awards	2018	Top Streaming Song (Video)	Nominated	

== Remixes ==
On December 5, 2017, American rapper Joyner Lucas released the remix of the song onto SoundCloud and has over 71 million views on YouTube. On March 18, 2018, a remix of the song premiered on OVO Sound Radio, featuring Ozuna, French Montana, J Balvin, Bad Bunny, Gucci Mane, Remy Ma, and 21 Savage.

== Chart performance ==
According to Billboard, "Gucci Gang" is the shortest song to hit the Hot 100's top 10 in 42 years, since Dickie Goodman's "Mr. Jaws" reached #4 on October 11, 1975.

== Charts ==
=== Weekly charts ===
Chart (2017–2018)	Peak position
Australia (ARIA)	18
Austria (Ö3 Austria Top 40)	30
Belgium (Ultratop 50 Flanders)	42
Belgium (Ultratop 50 Wallonia)	34
Canada Hot 100 (Billboard)	3
Czech Republic Singles Digital (ČNS IFPI)	13
Denmark (Tracklisten)	24
Finland (Suomen virallinen lista)	13
France (SNEP)	15
Germany (GfK)	35
Hungary (Single Top 40)	30
Hungary (Stream Top 40)	11
Ireland (IRMA)	31
Italy (FIMI)	24
Latvia (DigiTop100)	3
Netherlands (Single Top 100)	27
New Zealand (Recorded Music NZ)	15
Norway (VG-lista)	20
Portugal (AFP)	10
Scottish Singles Sales (Official Charts)	61
Slovakia Singles Digital (ČNS IFPI)	11
Spain (PROMUSICAE)	57
Sweden (Sverigetopplistan)	19
Switzerland (Schweizer Hitparade)	25
UK Singles (Official Charts)	27
US Billboard Hot 100	3
US Hot R&B/Hip-Hop Songs (Billboard)	2
US Rhythmic Airplay (Billboard)	11

=== Year-end charts ===
Chart (2017)	Position
Hungary (Stream Top 40)	71
US Hot R&B/Hip-Hop Songs (Billboard)	58
US Streaming Songs (Billboard)	70
Chart (2018)	Position
Canada (Canadian Hot 100)	41
France (SNEP)	162
US Billboard Hot 100	44
US Hot R&B/Hip-Hop Songs (Billboard)	20

== Certifications ==
Region	Certification	Certified units/sales
Australia (ARIA)	2× Platinum	140,000^{‡}
Belgium (BRMA)	Gold	10,000^{‡}
Canada (Music Canada)	2× Platinum	160,000^{‡}
Denmark (IFPI Danmark)	Gold	45,000^{‡}
France (SNEP)	Platinum	133,333^{‡}
Germany (BVMI)	Gold	200,000^{‡}
Italy (FIMI)	Platinum	50,000^{‡}
New Zealand (RMNZ)	Platinum	30,000^{‡}
Poland (ZPAV)	Gold	25,000^{‡}
Portugal (AFP)	Platinum	10,000^{‡}
Switzerland (IFPI Switzerland)	Gold	10,000^{‡}
United Kingdom (BPI)	Gold	400,000^{‡}
United States (RIAA)	5× Platinum	5,000,000^{‡}
^{‡} Sales+streaming figures based on certification alone.
