= Droptopwop =

Mixtape by Gucci Mane
- Released: May 26, 2017
- Recorded: 2017
- Genres: Hip-hop; trap
- Length: 37:30
- Labels: GUWOP; Atlantic
- Producers: Cubeatz; DJ Spinz; London on da Track; Metro Boomin; Southside

Gucci Mane chronology
The Return of East Atlanta Santa (2016)	Droptopwop (2017)	Mr. Davis (2017)

Droptopwop is a commercial mixtape by American rapper Gucci Mane. It was released on May 26, 2017, by GUWOP Enterprises and Atlantic Records. The entire mixtape is produced by Metro Boomin, along with extra production from Southside, London on da Track, DJ Spinz, and Cubeatz. It features guest appearances from Offset, 2 Chainz, Young Dolph, and Rick Ross.

Droptopwop charted at number 12 on the US Billboard 200, and received positive reviews from critics.

== Background ==
After announcing the project in early 2017, Gucci Mane revealed the cover art, track listing and release date two days before its release on May 24, 2017. The album cover is inspired by the cover of the Clipse album Lord Willin' (2002).

== Critical reception ==
Professional ratings
Aggregate scores
Source	Rating
Metacritic	72/100
Review scores
Source	Rating
AllMusic	3/5 stars
HipHopDX	3.7/5
HotNewHipHop	84%
Pitchfork	7.3/10
Pretty Much Amazing	B
Tiny Mix Tapes	3/5
XXL	4/5

Droptopwop was met with generally positive reviews. At Metacritic, which assigns a normalized rating out of 100 to reviews from professional publications, the album received an average score of 72, based on six reviews.

Preezy of XXL gave a positive review, stating "Gucci Mane's latest may be business as usual, but Droptopwop gives the customer exactly what they're looking for, which is a tried-and-true art within itself, making it another quality offering in the Atlanta legend's extensive catalog". Aaron McKrell of HipHopDX said, "His penchant for memorable music makes up for a lack of dexterity and gives Droptopwop a strong sense of unique artistry". Paul A. Thompson of Pitchfork wrote positively, "Droptopwop, his full-length collaboration with Metro Boomin, is Gucci's first post-prison project that truly gels. This is thanks in no small part to Metro".

Marshall Gu of Pretty Much Amazing said, "All told, it's another win in both artists' books, but a mild one". In a mixed review, AllMusic's Neil Z. Yeung stated: "Overall, while a worthwhile inclusion in Gucci's catalog, Droptopwop is most likely to be appreciated primarily by the Wop faithful still hungry after a dizzying seven releases within one year." Corrigan B of Tiny Mix Tapes noted, "With the bag secured, Gucci has nearly limitless options to proceed, but he's done little to show that he's interested in them. Droptopwop is a return to form insofar as it is the high point of his post-jail music, but a plateau is a plateau nonetheless".

=== Rankings ===
Year-end lists for Droptopwop
Publication	Accolade	Rank	Ref.
Complex	The Best Albums of 2017	24	
Noisey	The 100 Best Albums of 2017	86	

== Commercial performance ==
Droptopwop debuted at number 12 on the US Billboard 200 earning 32,000 album-equivalent units with 8,000 in pure album sales.

== Track listing ==
Droptopwop track listing
No.	Title	Writer(s)	Producer(s)	Length
1.	"5 Million Intro"	Radric Davis; Leland Wayne; Joshua Luellen	Metro Boomin; Southside	4:04
2.	"Tho Freestyle"	Davis; Wayne; Kevin Gomringer; Tim Gomringer	Metro Boomin; Cubeatz	2:40
3.	"Hurt a Nigga Feelings"	Davis; Wayne	Metro Boomin	3:38
4.	"Helpless"	Davis; Wayne; K. Gomringer; T. Gomringer	Metro Boomin; Cubeatz	3:14
5.	"Met Gala" (featuring Offset)	Davis; Wayne; Luellen; Kiari Cephus	Metro Boomin; Southside	3:29
6.	"Finesse the Plug Interlude"	Davis; Wayne; K. Gomringer; T. Gomringer	Metro Boomin; Cubeatz	4:45
7.	"Dance with the Devil"	Davis; Wayne; K. Gomringer; T. Gomringer	Metro Boomin; Cubeatz	4:24
8.	"Both Eyes Closed" (featuring 2 Chainz and Young Dolph)	Davis; Wayne; London Holmes; Tauheed Epps; Adolph Thornton Jr.	Metro Boomin; London on da Track	4:20
9.	"Bucket List"	Davis; Wayne; Gary Hill	Metro Boomin; DJ Spinz	3:29
10.	"Loss 4 Wrdz" (featuring Rick Ross)	Davis; Wayne; William Roberts II	Metro Boomin	3:23
Total length:				37:26

== Charts ==
=== Weekly charts ===
Chart performance for Droptopwop
Chart (2017)	Peak position
Canadian Albums (Billboard)	31
US Billboard 200	12
US Top R&B/Hip-Hop Albums (Billboard)	7

=== Year-end charts ===
2017 year-end chart performance for Droptopwop
Chart (2017)	Position
US Top R&B/Hip-Hop Albums (Billboard)	89
