= Anti-Taiwanese sentiment =

Anti-Taiwanese sentiment refers to the general dislike or hatred of the Taiwanese people or Taiwanese culture. Anti-Taiwanese sentiment (反臺灣) is often related to but can be distinct from sentiments against Taiwan independence (反臺獨).

== People's Republic of China ==
In the 21st century, anti-Taiwan Jingoism has emerged rapidly in the People's Republic of China, particularly on the Chinese internet. The Chinese government has at times denied that anti-Taiwanese sentiment is present in mainland China, insisting that residents are only opposed to Taiwanese independence. In 2016, the Taiwan Affairs Office declared that "there is no anti-Taiwanese sentiment among the people in mainland China, only anti–Taiwan independence". However, scholars have pointed to examples of Chinese netizens attacking Taiwanese people and culture to argue that anti-Taiwanese sentiment is a growing trend on the Chinese internet. The China Times published an editorial in 2016 arguing that "anti-China" sentiment had long been present in Taiwan and that "anti–Taiwan independence" sentiment had long been present in China, but that "anti-Taiwan" sentiment in Chinese civil society was a new and growing phenomenon. In 2018, a spokesperson for the Taiwan Affairs Office blamed Taiwan's Democratic Progressive Party for "triggering the emotions" of mainland netizens while insisting that anti-Taiwanese sentiment was not representative of China's stance.

Chinese authorities have also attempted to discourage anti-Taiwan rhetoric. Ma Xiaoguang, spokesperson for China's Taiwan Affairs Office, declared in 2021 that mainland netizens should "fight against Taiwanese independence" but not against Taiwan. During a coordinated campaign in 2016 by Chinese internet users to leave anti-independence messages on the Facebook page of newly elected president Tsai Ing-wen, organizers unsuccessfully insisted that participants should only attack the idea of Taiwanese independence rather than Taiwanese people or culture. According to a 2025 poll by the Chicago Council on Global Affairs and the Carter Center, sentiment against Taiwanese people remains low in China; 91% of Chinese people consider "our Taiwan compatriots" to be a friend of China, while 9% do not. The poll also found that 44% of Chinese people consider the "current government of Taiwan, China" to be a friend of China, while 55% do not.

== Other region ==
=== Japan ===
During the period of Taiwan under Japanese rule (1895–1945), Taiwanese residents faced institutionalized discrimination and social inequality. Despite being subjects of the Empire of Japan, Taiwanese people were subjected to unequal legal frameworks, wage disparities, and restricted access to higher education and civil service positions compared to Japanese mainlanders. However, following the end of World War II and the demise of the Empire of Japan in 1945, institutionalized discrimination against Taiwanese in Japan was officially abolished.

Expressing affinity toward China or a Taiwanese identity distinct from Japan was severely suppressed by colonial authorities and Japanese media. A prominent example occurred in June 1936 during the "Motherland Event" (Chinese: 祖國事件), when Lin Hsien-tang, a leading Taiwanese political and cultural figure, was publicly confronted and slapped by a Japanese right-winger in Taichung after referring to China as his "motherland" during a trip to Shanghai. Lin was subjected to racial slurs, intense media attacks by the Taiwan Daily News, and pressure from the military authority. The resulting backlash forced Lin to resign from all of his political and cultural positions and relocate to Tokyo.

=== United States ===
In May 2022, a politically motivated mass shooting occurred at the Geneva Presbyterian Church in Laguna Woods, California, which served a predominantly Taiwanese congregation. The gunman, a Chinese-American, opened fire on churchgoers, killing one and injuring five others. Law enforcement officials classified the attack as a hate crime motivated by anti-Taiwanese sentiment and political hatred toward Taiwan's independence.

=== Vietnam ===
Anti-Taiwanese sentiment in Vietnam has primarily manifested as an extension of anti-Chinese sentiment, often due to a lack of distinction between Taiwan and mainland China among the public. During the 2014 Vietnam anti-China riots, which erupted over South China Sea territorial disputes with Beijing, anti-China protesters targeted, looted, and burned hundreds of Taiwanese-owned factories and businesses in industrial parks near Ho Chi Minh City and Bình Dương province. Taiwanese investors suffered estimated losses ranging between US$1.5 billion and US$5 billion, forcing thousands of Taiwanese expatriates to flee the country.

== Relationship with anti-Chinese sentiment ==
Anti-Taiwanese sentiment is sometimes motivated by anti-Chinese sentiment because of the existence of a perception that Taiwanese is ethnically close to Chinese; during the 2014 Vietnam anti-China protests, anti-Taiwanese sentiment emerged as an extension of anti-Chinese sentiment. In contrast, politically pro-China attitudes sometimes lead to anti-Taiwan, because China (PRC) regards Taiwan as its territory under the One China principle and does not consider it an independent country, and diplomatically Taiwan is at odds with China.

== Derogatory terms ==
=== In Chinese ===
- Spiritually Japanese (Chinese: 精神日本人) – ethnic slur used by anti-Japanese mainland Chinese to demean Taiwanese who are more friendly to Japan.
- Taibazi (Chinese: 台巴子) – the term used by mainland Chinese or non-Taiwanese individuals to refer to Taiwanese people, meaning "rural bumpkin from Taiwan." Taibazi became a specific term, originating from Shanghai vendors and later widely circulating throughout the Chinese-speaking region.

=== In Japanese ===
- Chankoro – derogatory term originating from a corruption of the Taiwanese Hokkien pronunciation of 清國奴 Chheng-kok-lô͘, used to refer to any "Chinaman", with a meaning of "Qing dynasty's slave". (Note: Chankoro was often used when the Japanese people disparaged the Taiwanese people during the Taiwan under Japanese rule before 1945. Since today's Japanese people perceive Taiwanese people and mainland Chinese people as individual nations, they rarely refer to them as chankoro when disparaging Taiwanese people.)
- Sangokujin (三国人) – antiquated term meaning "people from third countries", referring to ethnic Korean/Taiwanese (former colonial subjects) people in Japan. Considered by some to now be a slur.

=== In Korean ===
- Jjangkkae (Korean: 짱깨) or Seomjjangkkae (Korean: 섬짱깨) – the Korean pronunciation of 掌櫃 (zhǎngguì), literally "shopkeeper", originally referring to owners of Chinese restaurants and stores; derogatory term referring to Chinese people. Seom (섬) means "island [of Taiwan]."

== See also ==
- 2022 Laguna Woods shooting
- Chinese imperialism
- Pro-Taiwanese sentiment
- Tzuyu Flag Incident
