= Far East Freedom Youth League =

Far East Freedom Youth League 遠東青年自由同盟
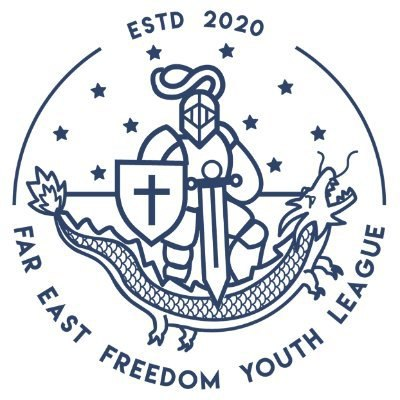
- Abbreviation: FEFYL
- Founded: October 31, 2020
- Ideology: Anti–People's Republic of China sentiment Anti-Communism; Anti-Putinism; Indigenism; Regionalism Separatism
- Political position: Big tent
- Slogan: Dismantle the Chinese Empire. Embrace a Free Far East.

The Far East Freedom Youth League (Chinese: 遠東青年自由同盟) or FEFYL is a non-profit Asian American political organization registered in California. It promotes the independence of, among others, Tibet, East Turkestan, Hong Kong and Taiwan, and participates in protests and demonstrations organized by Hong Kong exiles and democracy activists.

== Goals ==
The Groups describes itself as "a group of youth from captive nations occupied by China (so-called china mainland), dedicated to the freedom of the Far East" and promotes the separation of the People's Republic of China into independent constituent states.

== Activity ==
In March 2021, the League participated in the Asian American Anti-Discrimination March in San Francisco. However, because the group members and some Hong Kong people and democracy activists present at the event were holding anti-communist banners and slogans opposing China's suppression of Hong Kong and the Uyghurs, they clashed with the pro-communist organizers.

From 2021 to 2022, FEFYL, along with the Tibetan Youth Congress, participated in a boycott of the Beijing Winter Olympics.

After the Russian invasion of Ukraine in 2022, the League, along with several Asian American groups, participated in several Ukrainian rallies in California in opposition to the war.

After the Laguna Woods shooting in May 2022, the group participated in a joint press conference convened by Taiwan's Overseas Community Affairs Council and expressed support for Taiwan's independence and self-determination.
