= Tzuyu Incident =

2015 incident in East Asia

- Traditional Chinese: 周子瑜國旗事件
- Simplified Chinese: 周子瑜国旗事件
- Literal meaning: Chou Tzu-yu flag incident
Transcriptions
Standard Mandarin
- Hanyu Pinyin: Zhōu Zǐyú guóqí shìjiàn
- Bopomofo: ㄓㄡ ㄗˇ ㄩˊ ㄍㄨㄛˊ ㄑㄧˊ ㄕˋ ㄐㄧㄢˋ

The Tzuyu Incident or Tzuyu Scandal happened in late 2015 when Huang An, a pro-unification Taiwanese entertainer, accused Tzuyu, a Taiwanese member of South Korean girl group Twice who carried the flag of Taiwan on an episode of My Little Television, of supporting Taiwanese Separatists. Huang's post on Weibo sparked anti-Taiwanese sentiment among mainland Chinese netizens, which led to a boycott of Tzuyu, Twice, and their management company JYP Entertainment. This resulted in the cancellation of Tzuyu's mobile advertising model contract, and Twice's pre-booked performance in China. An apology video was uploaded to JYP Entertainment's official YouTube channel on January 15 in which she described herself as "Chinese".

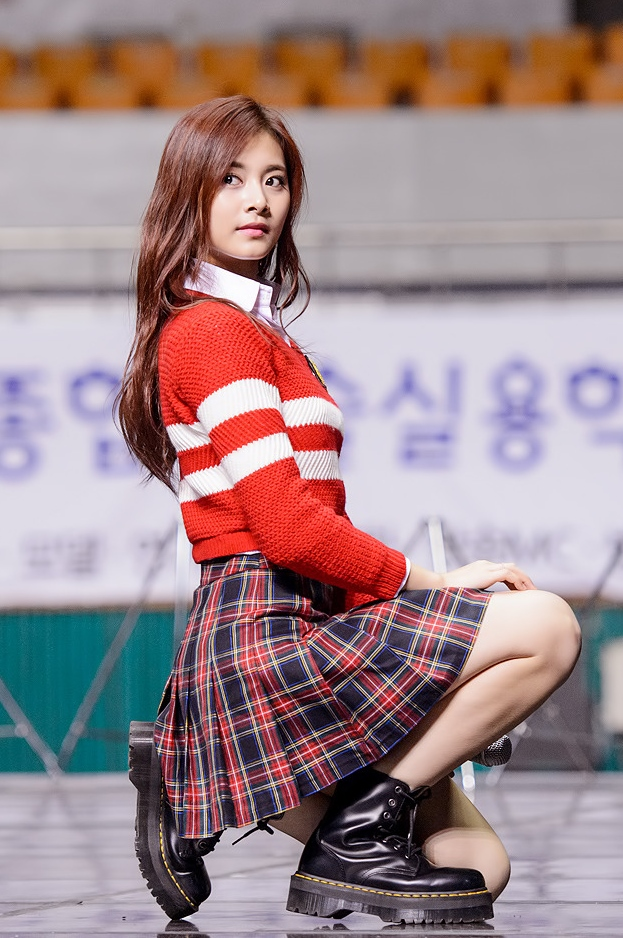
Tzuyu performing at Seoul Arts College on February 27, 2016.

The apology video was released on the eve of the 2016 Taiwanese presidential election; after the election, a think tank poll pointed out that the Tzuyu Incident affected about 10 percent of the vote, benefiting the pan-green Democratic Progressive Party and the centrist People First Party. Three candidates, Tsai Ing-wen, Eric Chu and James Soong, as well as Ma Ying-jeou, then president of Taiwan, publicly supported Tzuyu. The incident sparked anti-Chinese and anti-South Korean sentiment among the Taiwanese people.

== Background ==
China's cultural industry has become a very large single market due to its huge economic scale, and among neighboring countries, Japan and South Korea have export advantages to China. Although the domestic market of South Korea is small, it has a mature industrial system and strong export capabilities, and the Korean Wave has been formed worldwide since the 2000s. In a study of the cultural industries of the three countries, China–Japan–South Korea, data show that the South Korean cultural industry has a higher international market share than Japan and China. In a 2014 Beijing Evening News report, South Korean producers revealed that China has become the biggest consumer market for the Korean Wave. Despite being the largest consumer market, censorship is very common in China due to the fear of spreading political freedoms, meaning artists must self-censor before entering the Chinese market.

== Incident ==
The Flag of the Republic of China (Taiwan) became a point of contention in this incident.

On November 21, 2015, Tzuyu appeared with bandmates Sana, Momo, and Mina on the Korean variety show My Little Television. She introduced herself as Taiwanese and held the flag of the Republic of China alongside that of South Korea. On the same day, Huang An, a Taiwanese singer who supports Chinese unification, referred to the incident on Weibo, a Chinese social media outlet, accusing Tzuyu of being pro-Taiwan independence. However, when Tzuyu's fans explained to Huang that the flag was provided by the Korean production company, Huang deleted the post.

On January 8, 2016, Huang criticized Tzuyu for performing in mainland China, denouncing her as a "Taiwanese Separatist" (台獨份子). Mainland Chinese internet users reacted angrily towards Tzuyu's actions due to the political rift between the two countries. Soon after, Twice was barred from Chinese television and Tzuyu was pulled out of her endorsement with Chinese communications company Huawei.

As the incident grew, her agency, JYP Entertainment, released a video showing Tzuyu reading an apology, which said in part:

There is only one China, the two sides of the strait are one, and I have always felt proud to be Chinese. I feel extremely apologetic to my company and to Internet friends on both sides of the strait for the hurt that I have caused, and I also feel very guilty.

As many believed the statement was made under duress, the apology video infuriated the Taiwanese public on election day. The incident gained international attention as it was believed to have affected the 2016 Taiwanese general election, which was won by Tsai Ing-wen and the pro-independence DPP by a wide margin. While the DPP were already leading the polls months prior to the election, a survey found that Tzuyu's video apology affected the decision of about 1.34 million young voters, either by swaying them to vote or change their votes. Scholars believe that the incident probably contributed one or two percentage points to Tsai's winning margin.

In response to criticism, JYP Entertainment announced that it would be adopting new procedures concerning its exports and overseas activities in order to protect employees from future controversies. This included the implementation of cultural sensitivity training for its artists and staff members. In an interview with The Korea Times, a JYP representative stated that the training would include issues pertaining to political conflicts between countries.

== See also ==
- Anti-Taiwanese sentiment
- One China principle
- Political status of Taiwan
- Hurting of the feelings of the Chinese People
