= Tsagaan Khas =

Mongolian neo-Nazi organisation

White Swastika Patriots Цагаан Хас Эх орончид ᠴᠠᠭᠠᠨ ᠬᠠᠰ ᠡᢈᠡ ᠣᠷᠤᠨᠴᠢᠳ
- Flag of the Tsagaan Khas
- Other name: Tsagaan Khas
- Founder: Altankhuugiin Ariunbold
- Founded: 1990; 36 years ago
- Dissolved: 8 August 2023; 3 years ago
- Country: Mongolia
- Active regions: Ulaanbaatar, Dornogovi
- Ideology: Neo-Nazism; Pan-Mongolism; Resource nationalism; Anti-Chinese sentiment; Homophobia; Anti-nuclear movement
- Political position: Far-right
- Status: Defunct
- Size: ~100 (2013 est.)

Tsagaan Khas (Mongolian: Цагаан Хас, lit. 'white swastika') (Note: Official full name: Mongolian: Цагаан Хас Эх орончид, romanized: Tsagaan Khas Ekh oronchid, lit. 'White Swastika Patriots') was a Mongolian neo-Nazi organisation active during the mid-2010s. It was founded by Altankhuugiin Ariunbold in the 1990s, amid Mongolia's transition to a market economy and the resulting increase in economic inequality. The group was established and registered as a nonprofit organization in 2012 and dissolved on 8 August 2023. Tsagaan Khas engaged in anti-Chinese sentiment, homophobia, and anti-nuclear activities. In 2013, the group gained significant media attention from foreign media outlets such as Reuters.

== Members ==
The group claimed to have 3,000 members, but Reuters reported in 2013 that it had "only 100-plus members", while Mongolian historian Nyam Puruv estimated in 2009 that the group actually had only "dozens of members". The organisation's electoral affiliate received less than 1 percent of the vote in the 2008 Mongolian legislative elections.

== Ideology ==
According to Ariunbold: "The reason we chose [neo-Nazism] is because what is happening here in Mongolia is like 1939, and [Adolf] Hitler's movement transformed his country into a powerful country." Ariunbold has praised Francisco Franco and Genghis Khan.

The group's co-founder, who goes by the alias "Big Brother", said: "Adolf Hitler was someone we respect. He taught us how to preserve national identity ... We don't agree with his extremism and starting the Second World War. We are against all those killings, but we support his ideology. We support nationalism rather than fascism." The group's members dress in Nazi attire (such as uniforms resembling that of the Schutzstaffel) and use the "sieg heil" greeting, the Iron Cross, and the Nazi eagle. Its members have justified their use of Nazi imagery by pointing to the Asian origins of the swastika.

Big Brother has asserted that the group does not promote crime, expels "criminal elements" from its membership, and requires its members to have a good education. He has also claimed that the group works closely with other ultranationalist groups in Mongolia.

=== Sinophobia ===
The group's members are characterized by their extreme anti-Chinese sentiment and opposition to interracial marriage. One follower of the group has expressed the view that: "We have to make sure that as a nation our blood is pure. That's about our independence ... If we start mixing with Chinese, they will slowly swallow us up. Mongolian society is not very rich. Foreigners come with a lot of money and might start taking our women." The group has been accused of harassing and promoting violence against interracial couples, immigrants, prostitutes, and the LGBT community. The group has targeted Mongolian women who have had relationships with Chinese men, shaving their hair off and sometimes tattooing their foreheads.

Some negative attitudes towards Chinese people in Mongolia from groups such as Tsagaan Khas may be traced to the Soviet Union's policy of casting China as a threat to Mongolia, so as to receive allegiance from Mongolia. During the Sino-Soviet split, the Mongolian People's Republic gave the Soviet Union its steadfast support in all matters.

=== Environmentalism ===
In 2013, the group tried to shift its focus to fighting pollution resulting from mining in Mongolia. In an interview with Reuters, Ariunbold stated, "[O]ur purpose changed from fighting foreigners in the streets to fighting the mining companies." Its members have appeared at mining operations, demanding to see paperwork and sometimes sabotaging the operations if they deemed it mismanaged. The group has demanded soil samples from the mining operations, in order to check for soil contamination. According to Ariunbold, the group wants to fulfill a role which the local authorities have supposedly failed at concerning foreign mining companies.

=== Anti-nuclear energy ===
In the aftermath of the Fukushima nuclear accident in 2011, Japan and the United States planned to jointly build a nuclear waste storage facility in Mongolia. This proposal between the three sides promptly led to a strong opposition from various Mongolian civil groups. Between 2011 and 2013, Tsagaan Khas engaged in several anti-nuclear energy activities. During a local television interview in 2013, then-head of the group Jambalyn Erdenezaya stated that the group opposes the extraction of uranium in Dornogovi Province, as well as the establishment of nuclear power plants and nuclear waste facilities in Mongolia, citing the 2011 Fukushima accident.

== Dissolution ==
Tsagaan Khas was officially dissolved as a registered nonprofit organization on 8 August 2023. Prior to its termination, the group had experienced a significant decline in operational capacity and public visibility following pressure from authorities and international scrutiny regarding ultra-nationalistic activity in Mongolia. In its later years, the organization attempted to rebrand its public image from street activism toward resource nationalism and environmental inspections of foreign mining sites, though its membership decreased significantly to an estimated 100 members or fewer before its dissolution.
