= Taibazi =

Ethnic slur in which mainland Chinese refer to Taiwanese

Taibazi (Chinese: 台巴子; pinyin: tái bāzǐ), or depatsy (Wugniu: ^{6}de-pa_{1}-tsy_{5}) in Shanghainese, is an ethnic slur in which mainland Chinese refer to Taiwanese, meaning "rural bumpkin from Taiwan." The term depatsy originated from Shanghai merchants, and has since spread widely throughout greater China as a discriminatory expression for Taiwanese.

== Etymology ==
Taiwan was a colony of the Empire of Japan before 1945, and since 1949, communist China has failed to rule Taiwan, so mainland China and Taiwan have formed many gaps in values, culture, customs, and life. Since the 1990s, Shanghai merchants have started to use depatsy (台巴子) as a derogatory term for Taiwanese. Patsy (巴子) has previously been a term used by Shanghainese to disparage outsiders.

== Examples ==
The term depatsy has sparked controversy on multiple occasions. In 2009, Typhoon Morakot disrupted cross-strait flights, including a China Eastern Airlines flight that was delayed. When a Taiwanese passenger complained to airline staff about the lack of advance notification, the staff member insulted the passenger as a depatsy, provoking intense outrage. China Eastern Airlines eventually dispatched a supervisor to apologize to the [Taiwanese] passengers.

Kuo Kuan-ying, an official from the Republic of China's Executive Yuan Information Bureau stationed in Toronto, published an article titled "Taibazi Want Dictatorship" (台巴子要專政) under the pen name Fan Lan-chin (范蘭欽), sparking outrage in Taiwanese public opinion. The Information Bureau subsequently dismissed Kuo from his post on grounds of "deceptive and reckless speech," resulting in his forfeiture of over NT$20 million in retirement benefits. Kuo later appealed to the Public Service Disciplinary Commission, which ruled he had failed to exercise "due diligence and prudence," warranting dismissal and a three-year ban on public service. The Control Yuan initiated impeachment proceedings, citing severe misconduct that tarnished the government's image. On January 18, 2017, the Taipei High Administrative Court ruled in Kuo's favor regarding his retirement case, though the decision remained appealable to the Supreme Administrative Court. On September 6, 2018, Taiwan's Supreme Administrative Court dismissed the appeal filed by the Ministry of Civil Service, confirming Kuo's victory and finalizing the case.

== See also ==
- Anti-Taiwanese sentiment
