= 2022 Laguna Woods shooting =

Mass shooting in California, U.S.

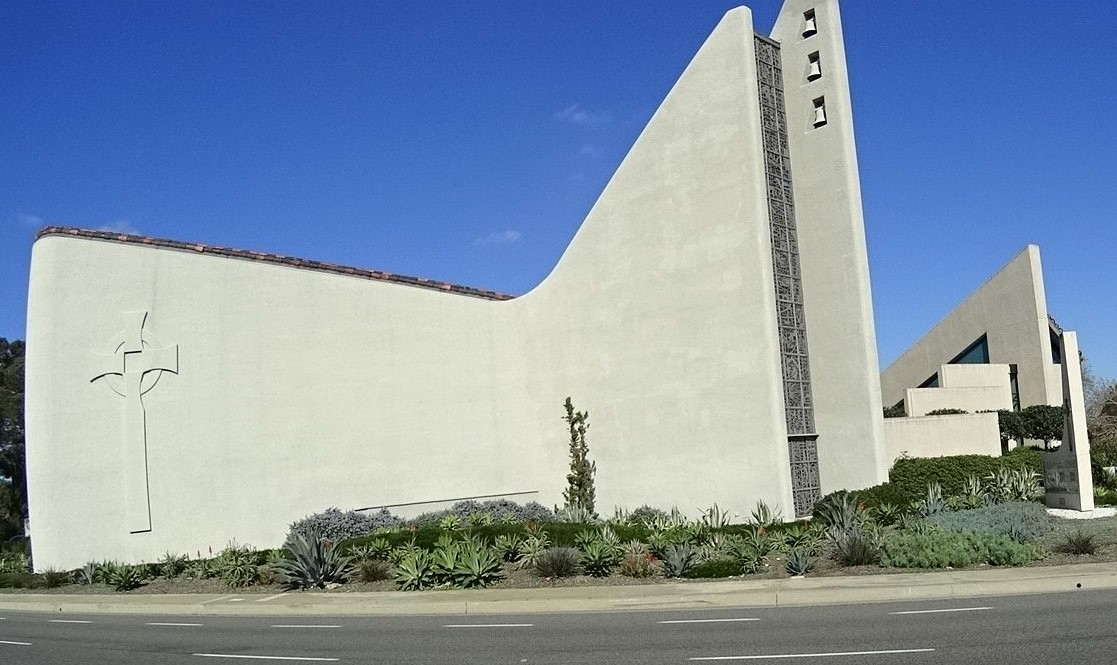
- Geneva Presbyterian Church in 2020
- Location: 33.60964°N 117.73338°W; 24301 El Toro Road, Laguna Woods, California, United States
- Date: May 15, 2022; 4 years ago c. 1:26 p.m. (PDT)
- Attack type: Mass shooting; hate crime
- Weapons: Two 9mm handguns; Molotov cocktails
- Deaths: 1
- Injuries: 5
- Defender: John Cheng
- Motive: Anti-Taiwanese sentiment (suspected)
- Accused: David Chou
- Charges: Murder (1 count)*; Attempted murder (5 counts)*; Possession of explosive device (4 counts); *Hate crime enhancement

On May 15, 2022, a mass shooting occurred at the Geneva Presbyterian Church in Laguna Woods, California, United States. The Orange County church was hosting a congregation of the Irvine Taiwanese Presbyterian Church for Sunday services. The shooter killed one person and wounded five others. A suspect, 68-year-old David Chou of Las Vegas, was arrested at the scene. Authorities allege that the crime was committed out of political hatred of those with different views on Taiwan. Chou has been charged with one count of murder and five counts of attempted murder, all with hate crime enhancements, and four counts of possessing an explosive device. He was later indicted on 98 federal charges.

== Shooting ==
The attack happened during a luncheon after the church service. There were between 30 and 40 people inside.

At around 10:10 a.m. local time, the would-be shooter entered the sanctuary. The receptionist, who did not recognize the man, asked him to fill out a form with his personal details. He refused, claiming to have completed the form in the past. Witnesses said he mingled with other attendees and spoke to them in Taiwanese Hokkien. Pastor Billy Chang said the man sat in the back of the sanctuary and was reading a newspaper throughout the entire sermon.

After the service, the church goers gathered in a separate hall for a luncheon in Chang's honor, and some guests who left early saw the shooter attempting to lock the doors with chains. While some asked what he was doing, others assumed he was a security officer. He then shot first into the ceiling, with many assuming it was a balloon popping instead of gunfire. Some attendees dropped to the floor and crawled under tables before an attendee, John Cheng, charged the shooter and tried to disarm him but was in turn shot and killed. As the shooter attempted to reload his weapon, pastor Billy Chang hit the man on the head with a chair. Several attendees then tackled and hogtied him with an extension cord and confiscated two handguns, which were eventually recovered by police. After he complained, those holding the shooter down eased up on the force of restraint to allow him to breathe.

Police were alerted at about 1:26 p.m. They found the doors chained shut and their locks glued. Four items similar to Molotov cocktails were stored inside.

== Victims ==
A 52-year-old man named John Cheng was killed after trying to stop the shooter. While Cheng was not a member of the congregation, he accompanied his mother there to mourn his father. Five other victims, all of Taiwanese descent and aged between 66 and 92, were also shot but survived their injuries. Four of them were male, and one was an 86-year-old female.

== Accused ==
David Wenwei Chou (Chinese: 周文偉; pinyin: Zhōu Wénwěi) was born in 1953 in Taiwan as a second-generation waishengren and raised in a military dependents' village as his father was in the military. He graduated from the Taichung First Senior High School in 1971 and completed a master's degree in the U.S. during the 1990s, after which he worked as a translator. He also lectured at different schools such as the National Pingtung Institute of Commerce in 1994.

Chou considers himself and Taiwanese as "all Chinese" of a single country without a border. In the past, immigration documents from Taiwan often showed China as the place of birth. This might have led law enforcement and some media outlets to misidentify Chou as an immigrant from the mainland.

According to his former neighbor, Chou moved to Las Vegas in 2009 and once owned an apartment building. In 2012, he suffered a nearly fatal attack from two tenants over rent that led to a loss of consciousness, a broken skull, elbow, and partial hearing loss. He also suspected that the police detectives tried to withhold a bag with his money before the prosecutor allowed it to be finally returned. The incident is said to have changed his temperament and view of law enforcement negatively.

Acquaintances who knew Chou and his wife through the Taiwanese Association of Las Vegas and the local Taiwanese Presbyterian Church were surprised by his pro-unification stance, because most members there were pro-independence. They recalled Chou was very negative about life and complained about unfairness in society, about Taiwan and U.S. government and law enforcement. In 2019, Chou attended the founding ceremony of Las Vegas Chinese for Peaceful Unification and displayed a banner calling for the "eradication of pro independence demons". The association's spokesperson said he demonized people from Taiwan and has not been involved with the organization since the second half of 2019.

During their divorce in 2021, his wife returned to Taiwan, where their son lives, for late stage cancer treatment. Chou's life unraveled after she left and the building was sold. He found occasional work as a security guard, but the income was not enough to pay for his rent. After being evicted from his old building, he moved into a different place with a roommate. Chou's mental stability appeared to diminish, telling his former neighbor "I just don’t care about my life anymore.” He once fired a gun without injuring anyone. Other tenants have found photographs of Chou posing with a gun and laughing hysterically at a memorial for the 2017 Las Vegas shooting.

Two weeks before driving to Laguna Woods, Chou told his roommate that he felt the Taiwanese government was corrupt and disliked those who were sympathetic to its leaders. He had allegedly written a manifesto entitled Diary of the Independence-Slaying Angel (滅獨天使日記) and mailed it to the pan-blue World Journal. The package arrived one day after the shooting and is in the possession of the newspaper's attorney pending subpoena.

== Investigation and legal proceedings ==
Law enforcement has described the shooting as motivated by political tension and hatred of Taiwan. Sheriff Don Barnes said that handwritten notes recovered from a vehicle expressed Chou's "hatred for the Taiwanese people" and belief that Taiwan should not be independent from China. Barnes surmised that these sentiments began because of the way Chou was received and treated while growing up in Taiwan.

Chou has been held without bail. Prosecutors initially charged Chou with one count of murder, five counts of premeditated attempted murder, four counts of possession of an explosive device, and enhancement charges of lying in wait and personal discharge of a firearm causing death. On June 17 prosecutors added hate crime enhancements to the murder and attempted murder charges. If convicted, Chou could face the death penalty or life imprisonment. In May 2023, Chou was indicted on 98 federal charges, including hate crimes and weapons charges.

In March 2026, Chou was transferred to federal custody and pleaded not guilty to 53 charges.

== Reactions ==
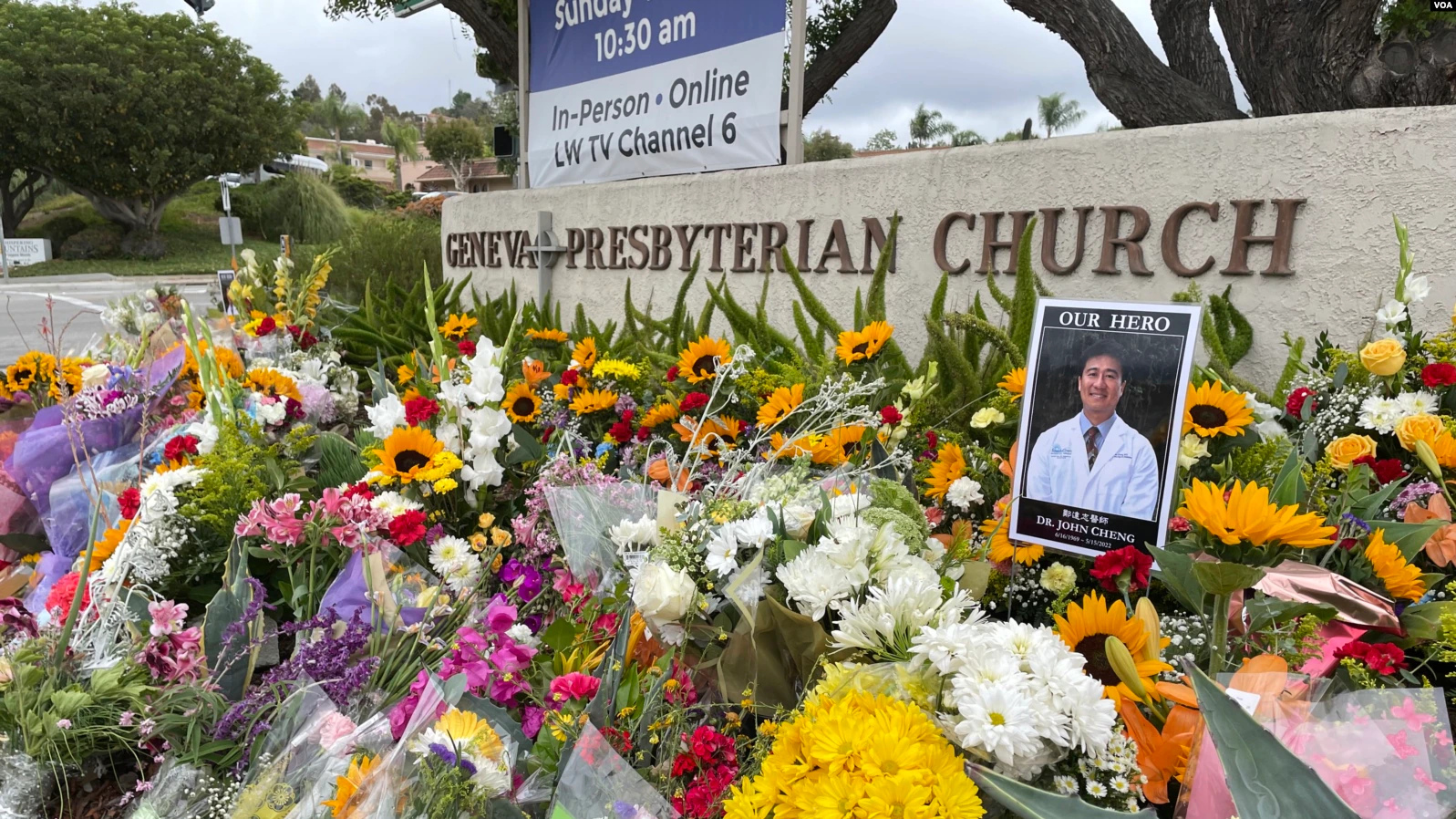
Bouquets in memory of Cheng outside the church

Sheriff Barnes commended Cheng as a heroic figure who prevented the shooter from hurting more people. U.S. Representative Katie Porter, whose district includes Laguna Woods, also referred to an earlier shooting in Buffalo, New York and said, "This should not be our new normal. I will work hard to support the victims and their families."

Taiwanese president Tsai Ing-wen condemned the shooting and offered condolences to the victims. She asked for representatives in the US to fly to California to offer assistance. Hsiao Bi-khim, Taiwan's de facto ambassador, posted on Twitter that she was "shocked and saddened by the fatal shooting" and would mourn with the Taiwanese-American community and victims' families. The Taiwanese Kuomintang also condemned the shooting.

Some have blamed the incident on Beijing's unification rhetoric. In Taiwan, DPP legislator Lin Ching-yi attributed the shooting to “genocidal ideology”, and 60 civic groups called for the designation of Chinese for Peaceful Unification as a terrorist organization. Although not necessarily the same group, the National Association for China's Peaceful Unification has been accused of at times extremist messaging by Michael Cole, a fellow at the Macdonald–Laurier Institute. Lev Nachman, a fellow at the Fairbank Center for Chinese Studies notes how the Presbyterian Church in Taiwan has supported independence since the 1970s but cautions against simplifying the shooting as China versus Taiwan.

Wang Wenbin, a spokesperson for China's ministry of foreign affairs, said, "[W]e hope the US government can take action against its increasingly severe gun violence problem". Liu Pengyu, spokesperson for the Chinese Embassy in Washington, said, "We express our condolences to the victims and sincere sympathy to the bereaved families and the injured."

On May 21, local elected officials and religious leaders gathered at the church to memorialize and honor the victims of the shooting. A moment of silence was held for Dr. Cheng. Representative Young Kim stated that there is no place in society for any type of hate and the community needed to stand together.

In June 2022, Representatives Katie Porter and Michelle Steel proposed a bill to posthumously award the Congressional Gold Medal to Cheng.

== See also ==
- Hate crime
- List of mass shootings in the United States in 2022
- List of shootings in California
