= Chankoro =

Japanese Sinophobic ethnic slur

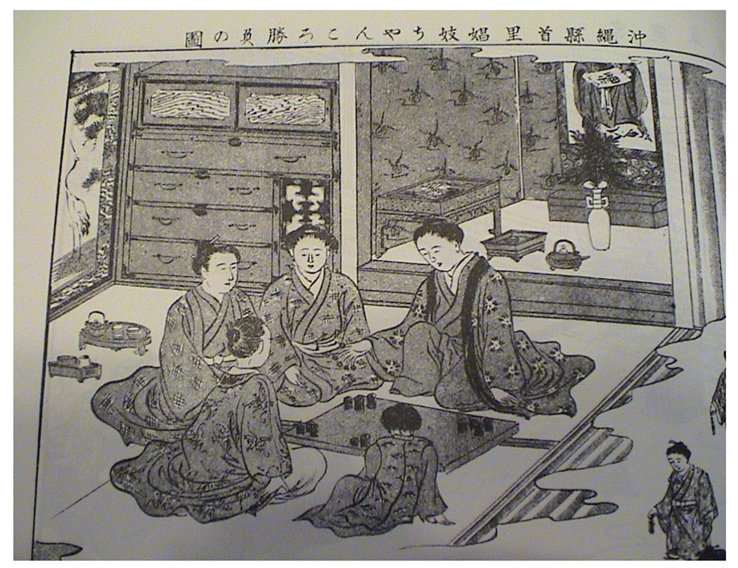
A picture of courtesans playing a chankoro game in Okinawa prefecture (Iha Fuyū, 1893). The slur is used to stress the subjugated position of Okinawan women

Chankoro (Japanese: ちゃんころ or チャンコロ) is a Sinophobic ethnic slur used by the Japanese since the end of the Qing dynasty. It was also an expression of insult to the Chinese people.

The etymology of the term is unclear. Ogata suggests "pigtailed fellow" while Shih states that it means "Qing slave".

In the English subtitles of the multilingual Chinese movie Devils on the Doorstep, the term is mostly translated as "Chinese pig" or "mongrel".

== In Korean ==
After Japan annexed Korea, the Japanese word chankoro entered the Korean language as jjangkkolla (Korean: 짱꼴라), which evolved into the current jjangkkae (Korean: 짱깨), which has become a representative derogatory term for Chinese people in Korea.

== See also ==
- Anti-Chinese sentiment in Japan
- Ching chong
- Chink, a similar slur in English
- Racism in Japan

== Sources ==
- Barske, Valerie H. (March 2013). "Visualizing Priestesses or Performing Prostitutes?: Ifa Fuyū's Depictions of Okinawan Women, 1913-1943" (PDF). Studies on Asia. Series IV. 3 (1).
- Ogata, Sadako (2022-11-02) [1965]. "The Japanese attitude towards China". Adelphi Series. 62 (498–501): 83–96. doi:10.1080/19445571.2022.2281784. ISSN 1944-5571.
- Shih, Fang-long (2022), A century of struggle over Taiwan's cultural self-consciousness: the life and afterlife of Chiang Wei-shui and the Taiwan Cultural Association* Simon, Scott (2006). "Formosa's First Nations and the Japanese: from Colonial Rule to Postcolonial Resistance". The Asia-Pacific Journal: Japan Focus. 4 e1. doi:10.1017/S1557466006003846. ISSN 1557-4660. Archived from the original on December 22, 2014.
- Tahmasbi, Fatemeh; Schild, Leonard; Ling, Chen; Blackburn, Jeremy; Stringhini, Gianluca; Zhang, Yang; Zannettou, Savvas (2021-04-19). "Go eat a bat, Chang!": On the Emergence of Sinophobic Behavior on Web Communities in the Face of COVID-19. ACM. pp. 1122–1133. arXiv:2004.04046. doi:10.1145/3442381.3450024. ISBN 978-1-4503-8312-7.
- Takeda, Kayoko (2013-05-29). "The interpreter as traitor: Multilingualism in Guizi lai le (Devils on the Doorstep)". Linguistica Antverpiensia, New Series – Themes in Translation Studies (13). doi:10.52034/lanstts.v0i13.71. ISSN 2295-5739.
