= Anti-Chinese sentiment =

Hostility or prejudice toward Chinese people

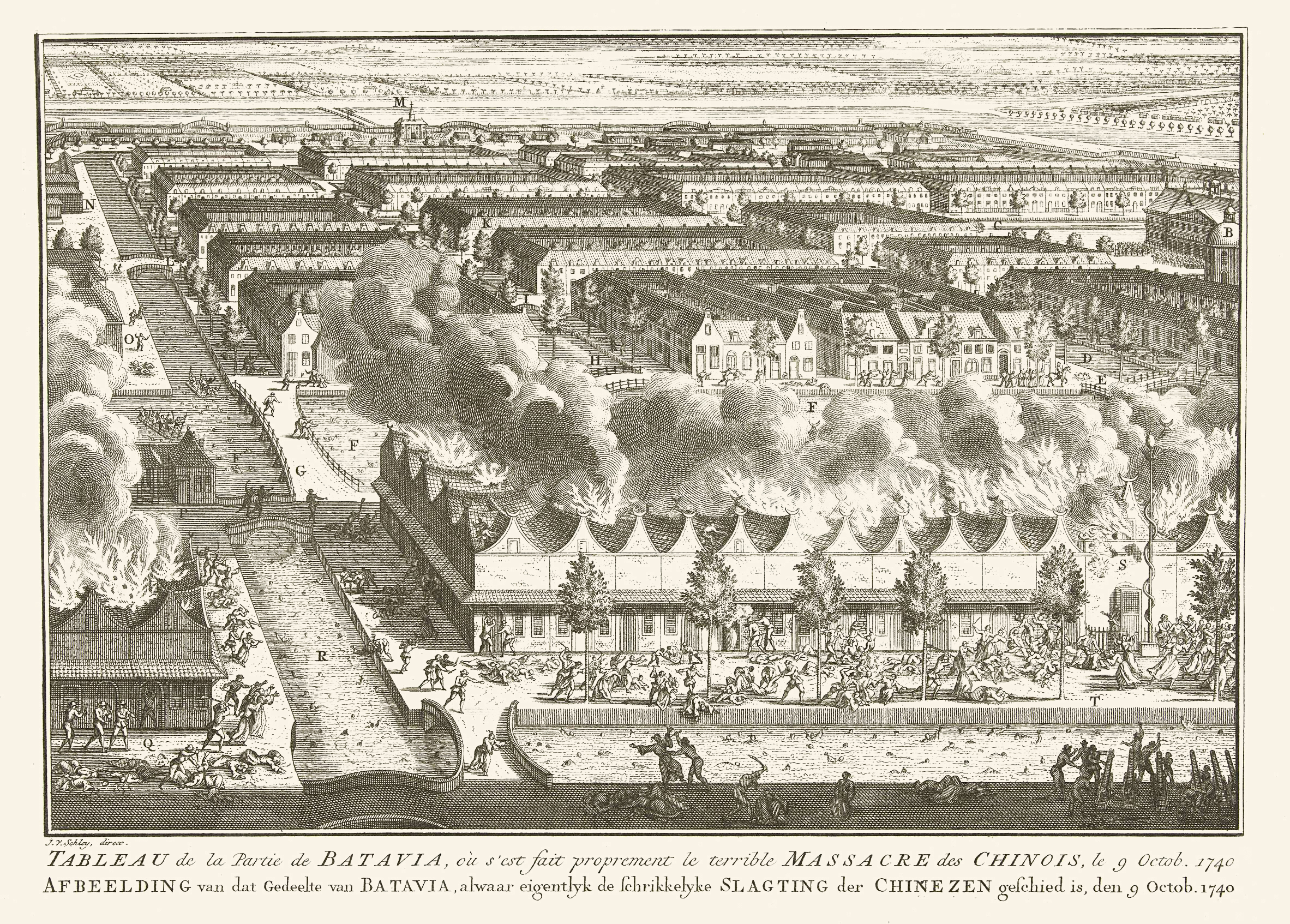
The 1740 Batavia massacre was a pogrom against Chinese people in Batavia.

Anti-Chinese sentiment or Sinophobia is prejudice, hatred, hostility, and discrimination that is directed towards Chinese people or Chinese culture.

It is frequently directed at Chinese people living outside Greater China and it involves immigration, nationalism, political ideologies, disparity of wealth, in-group loyalty, the past tributary system of Imperial China, majority-minority relations, war and imperialist legacies, and racism. (Note: In Sinosphere, "anti-Chinese government" (反中[國], lit. "anti-Chinese [state]), "anti-Communist" (反共 / 反中共) or "anti-People's Republic of China" (反中華人民共和國), which means political opposition to the Chinese government or state, is distinct from "anti-Chinese racism" (反華 / 嫌中), which is a racist hatred of the Chinese people.)

A variety of popular cultural clichés and negative stereotypes of Chinese people have existed around the world since the twentieth century, and they are frequently conflated with a variety of popular cultural clichés and negative stereotypes of other Asian ethnic groups, known as the Yellow Peril. Some individuals may harbor prejudice or hatred against Chinese people due to history, racism, modern politics, cultural differences, propaganda, or ingrained stereotypes, often fuelled by reports of uncouth behavior from some Chinese nationals.

The COVID-19 pandemic led to a resurgence of Sinophobia, the manifestations of it ranged from covert acts of discrimination such as microaggression and stigmatization, exclusion and shunning, to more overt forms of discrimination, such as outright verbal abuse and physical violence.

== History ==
=== Looting and sacking of national treasures ===
Historical records document the existence of anti-Chinese sentiment throughout the history of China's imperial wars.

Lord Palmerston was responsible for sparking the First Opium War (1839–1842) with Qing China. He considered Chinese culture "uncivilized", and his negative views on China played a significant role in his decision to issue a declaration of war. This disdain became increasingly common throughout the Second Opium War (1856–1860), when repeated attacks against foreign traders in China inflamed anti-Chinese sentiment abroad. Following the defeat of China in the Second Opium War, Lord Elgin, upon his arrival in Peking in 1860, ordered the sacking and burning of China's imperial Old Summer Palace in vengeance.

=== Chinese Exclusion Act 1882 ===
In the United States, the Chinese Exclusion Act of 1882 was passed in response to growing Sinophobia. It prohibited all immigration of Chinese laborers and turned those already in the country into second-class persons. The 1882 Act was the first U.S. immigration law to target a specific ethnicity or nationality. Meanwhile, during the mid-19th century in Peru, Chinese were used as slave labor and they were not allowed to hold any important positions in Peruvian society.

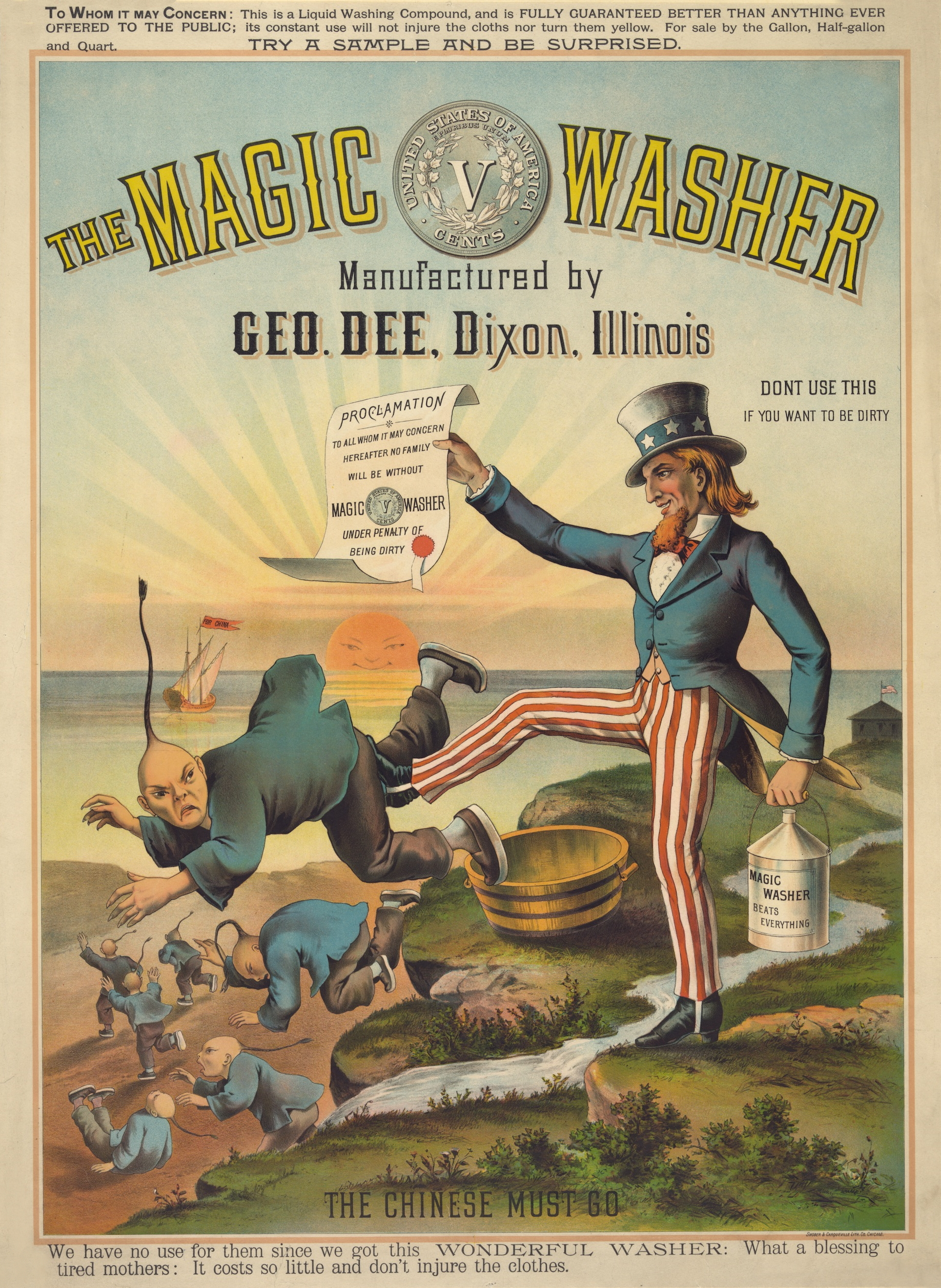
Anti-Chinese sentiment in the US

=== Chinese workers in England ===
Chinese workers had been a fixture on London's docks since the mid-eighteenth century, when they arrived as sailors who were employed by the East India Company, importing tea and spices from the Far East. Conditions on those long voyages were so dreadful that many sailors decided to abscond and take their chances on the streets rather than face the return journey. Those who stayed generally settled around the bustling docks, running laundries and small lodging houses for other sailors or selling exotic Asian produce. By the 1880s, a small but recognizable Chinese community had developed in the Limehouse area, increasing Sinophobic sentiments among other Londoners, who feared the Chinese workers might take over their traditional jobs due to their willingness to work for much lower wages and longer hours than other workers in the same industries. The entire Chinese population of London was only in the low hundreds—in a city whose entire population was roughly estimated to be seven million—but nativist feelings ran high, as was evidenced by the Aliens Act 1905, a bundle of legislation which sought to restrict the entry of poor and low-skilled foreign workers. Chinese Londoners also became involved with illegal criminal organisations, further spurring Sinophobic sentiments.

== By region ==
=== Central Asia ===
==== Kazakhstan ====
According to the Jamestown Foundation, while previously not known for being anti-Chinese, Kazakhstan since independence has grown increasingly hostile to both Russia and China, despite the Kazakh government walking a thin line to avoid upsetting Beijing. There is a long history of territorial grabs, conflicts, and perceived Chinese imperialism existing among Kazakh intellects, causing deep distrust. Plus, increasing repression of Kazakh minority in Xinjiang also soured positive perception among Kazakhs on China.

In 2020, a major ethnic clash broke out between Kazakhs and Dungans, who are Chinese Muslims; the Kazakh government was criticised for being late in response.

==== Kyrgyzstan ====
Anti-Chinese sentiment in Kyrgyzstan is, in many way, closely related to that in Kazakhstan due to shared Kipchak origin and the ongoing persecution of Kyrgyz in Xinjiang. In 2025, a construction dispute had resulted in a brawl between Chinese and Kyrgyz workers.

=== East Asia ===
==== Korea ====
Discriminatory views of Chinese people have been reported, and ethnic-Chinese Koreans have faced prejudices including what is said, to be a widespread criminal stigma. Increased anti-Chinese sentiments had reportedly led to online comments related to violent anti-Chinese racism. According to a Central European Institute of Asian Studies poll in 2022, 81% of South Koreans have negative views of China, while 77% had negative views of Chinese people.

==== Hong Kong ====
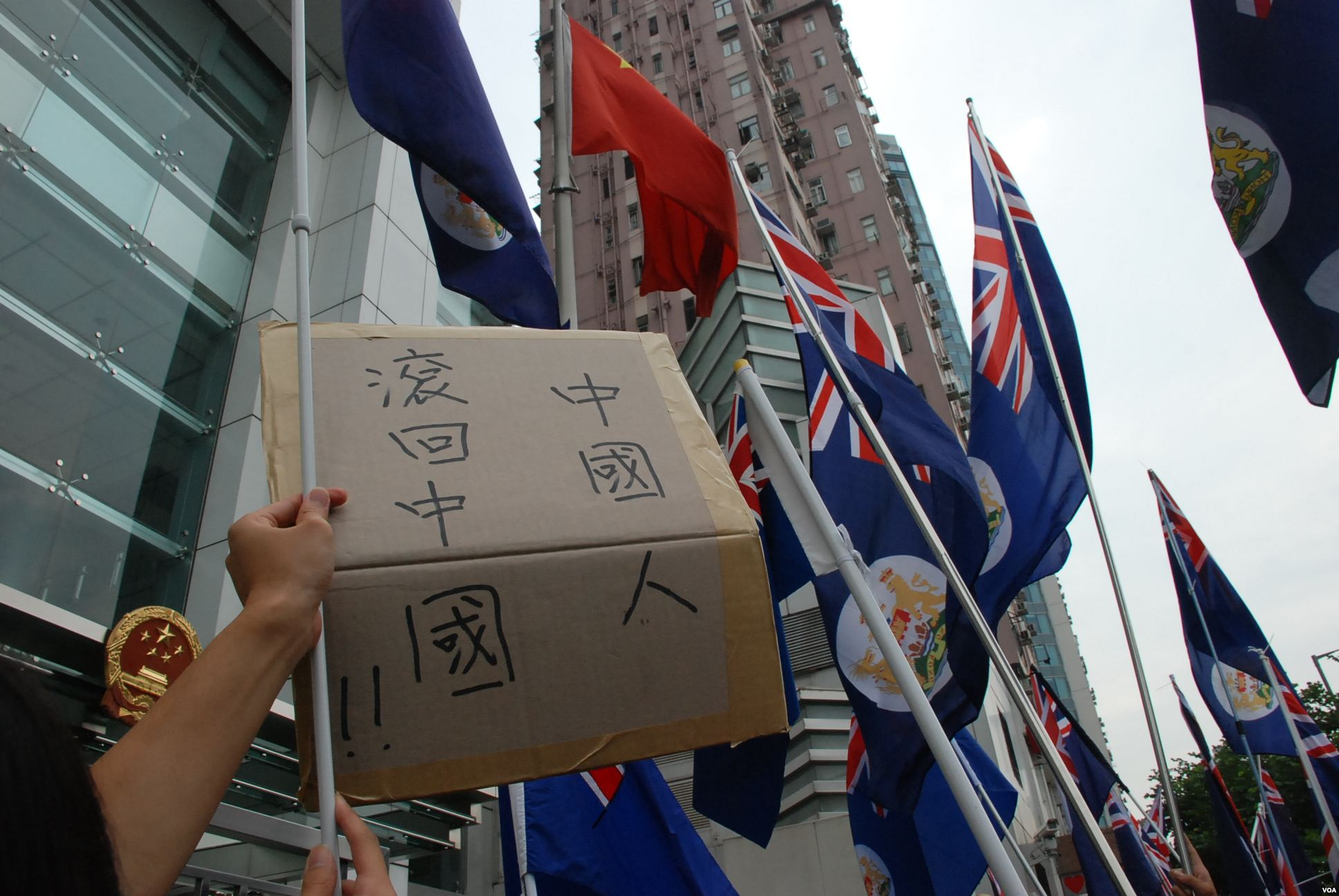
Demonstrators in Hong Kong demand that the Chinese go back to China.

Anti-Chinese sentiment in Hong Kong is mostly driven by political opposition to the PRC, but it is also motivated by racist hostility toward mainland Chinese.

In 2012, a group of Hong Kong residents published a newspaper advertisement depicting mainland visitors and immigrants as locusts. In February 2014, about 100 Hong Kongers harassed mainland tourists and shoppers during what they styled an "anti-locust" protest in Kowloon. In response, the Equal Opportunities Commission of Hong Kong proposed an extension of the territory's race-hate laws to cover mainlanders. Strong anti-mainland xenophobia has also been documented amidst the 2019 protests, with reported instances of protesters attacking Mandarin-speakers and mainland-linked businesses.

==== Japan ====
A survey in 2017 suggested that 51% of Chinese respondents had experienced tenancy discrimination. Another report in the same year noted a significant bias against Chinese visitors from the media and some of the Japanese locals.

==== Mongolia ====
Mongolian nationalist and Neo-Nazi groups are reported to be hostile to China, and Mongolians traditionally hold unfavorable views of the country. The common stereotype is that China is attempting to undermine Mongolian sovereignty in order to eventually incorporate it into China (the Republic of China has claimed Mongolia as part of its territory, see Outer Mongolia). Fear and hatred of erliiz (Mongolian: эрлийз, [ˈɛrɮiːt͡sə], literally, double seeds), a derogatory term for people of mixed Han Chinese and Mongol ethnicity, is a common phenomena in Mongolian politics. Erliiz are seen as a Chinese plot of genetic pollution to chip away at Mongolian sovereignty, and allegations of Chinese ancestry are used as a political weapon in election campaigns. Several small Neo-Nazi groups opposing Chinese influence and mixed Chinese couples are present within Mongolia, such as Tsagaan Khas.

==== Taiwan ====
Following the end of Japanese rule in 1945 and the transfer of Taiwan to the Republic of China, tensions emerged between different social groups on the island. Long-established Han Chinese residents — commonly referred to as benshengren (本省人), meaning families whose ancestors had migrated to Taiwan prior to 1945 — increasingly came into conflict with mainland Chinese newcomers whom were known as waishengren (外省人), who arrived with the Kuomintang (KMT) government after World War II. One frequently cited derogatory expressions from the late 1940s was "the dogs have left and the pigs have come" (狗去豬來 káu khì ti lâi), in which the departing Japanese colonial rulers were derisively compared to dogs and the incoming KMT authorities to pigs. Discontent with the KMT regime culminated in the February 28 Incident in 1947, when island-wide protests were violently suppressed. The incident and its aftermath deepened mistrust toward the ruling authorities and reinforced social divisions between benshengren and waishengren.

In contemporary Taiwan, negative sentiment has at times been directed explicitly toward waishengren, particularly in political rhetoric and online discourse related to cross-Strait relations. Taiwanese media have reported public controversies involving the use of derogatory language toward waishengren, prompting condemnation from political leaders and commentators across party lines.

Academic studies have also examined social attitudes of contemporary Taiwanese towards people from China. Research indicates that mainland Chinese, particularly marriage migrants, have sometimes been portrayed in public discourse as culturally inferior or politically suspect. The use of ideologically charged and derogatory terms, including gòngfěi (共匪, "Communist bandits") and Zhīnà (支那, an archaic Japanese term for China, now considered derogatory), by some Taiwanese when referring to mainland Chinese was also observed.

=== Southeast Asia ===
==== Brunei ====
The earliest violent display of Sinophobia in Brunei was during the Belait-Tutong Rebellion when in July 1901, attacks on the Birau area began, with the rebels targeting shops owned by ethnic Chinese merchants, resulting in four people killed and one hundred families robbed during the killing. With at least two hundred families fleeing into Sarawak, seeing no hope in Brunei.

==== Malaysia ====
Due to race-based politics and Bumiputera policy, there had been several incidents of racial conflict between the Malays and Chinese before the 1969 riots. For example, in Penang, hostility between the races turned into violence during the centenary celebration of George Town in 1957 which resulted in several days of fighting and a number of deaths, and there were further disturbances in 1959 and 1964, as well as a riot in 1967 which originated as a protest against currency devaluation but turned into racial killings. In Singapore, the antagonism between the races led to the 1964 Race Riots which contributed to the expulsion of Singapore from Malaysia on August 9, 1965. The 13 May Incident was perhaps the deadliest race riot to have occurred in Malaysia with an official combined death toll of 196 (143 Chinese, 25 Malays, 13 Indians, and 15 others of undetermined ethnicity), but with higher estimates by other observers reaching around 600-800+ total deaths.

Malaysia's ethnic quota system has been regarded as discriminatory towards the ethnic Chinese (and Indian) community, in favor of ethnic Malay Muslims, which has reportedly created a brain drain in the country. In 2015, supporters of Najib Razak's party reportedly marched in the thousands through Chinatown to support him, and assert Malay political power with threats to burn down shops, which drew criticism from China's ambassador to Malaysia.

It was reported in 2019 that relations between ethnic Chinese Malaysians and Malays were "at their lowest ebb", and fake news posted online of mainland Chinese indiscriminately receiving citizenship in the country had been stoking racial tensions. The primarily Chinese-based Democratic Action Party in Malaysia has also reportedly faced an onslaught of fake news depicting it as unpatriotic, anti-Malay, and anti-Muslim.

==== Philippines ====
The Spanish introduced the first anti-Chinese laws in the Philippine archipelago. The Spanish massacred or expelled the Chinese several times from Manila, and the Chinese responded by fleeing either to La Pampanga or to territories outside colonial control, particularly the Sulu Sultanate, which they in turn supported in their wars against the Spanish authorities. The Chinese refugees not only ensured that the Sūg people were supplied with the requisite arms but also joined their new compatriots in combat operations against the Spaniards during the centuries of Spanish–Moro conflict.

Furthermore, racial classification from the Spanish and American administrations has labeled ethnic Chinese as alien. This association between 'Chinese' and 'foreigner' have facilitated discrimination against the ethnic Chinese population in the Philippines; many ethnic Chinese were denied citizenship or viewed as antithetical to a Filipino nation-state. In addition to this, Chinese people have been associated with wealth in the background of great economic disparity among the local population. This perception has only contributed to ethnic tensions in the Philippines, with the ethnic Chinese population being portrayed as being a major party in controlling the economy.

===== Public opinion =====
China remains not trustworthy among the majority of the Filipinos. A December 2025 OCTA Research survey showed 60% of the respondents did not trust China, as opposed to 13% who answered they did. 79% of the respondents selected China as "the greatest threat to the Philippines", which the polling firm said was "a five-percentage point increase from 74 percent in July 2025".

In a Pulse Asia survey conducted in late February 2026, only 3% of the Filipino respondents supported a prospective state visit of Chinese leader Xi Jinping to the Philippines. 68% of the respondents supported the continuation of the transparency initiative against Chinese harassment of the Filipino fishermen and authorities, while 28% opposed it. Support for the initiative was highest among respondents in both Luzon and Metro Manila and lowest among the respondents in the Visayas.

A survey published in 2026 by the Pew Research Center found that 40% of Filipinos had a favorable view of China, while 57% had an unfavorable view. It also found that 47% of Filipinos in the 18-35 age group had positive opinions of China.

==== Indonesia ====
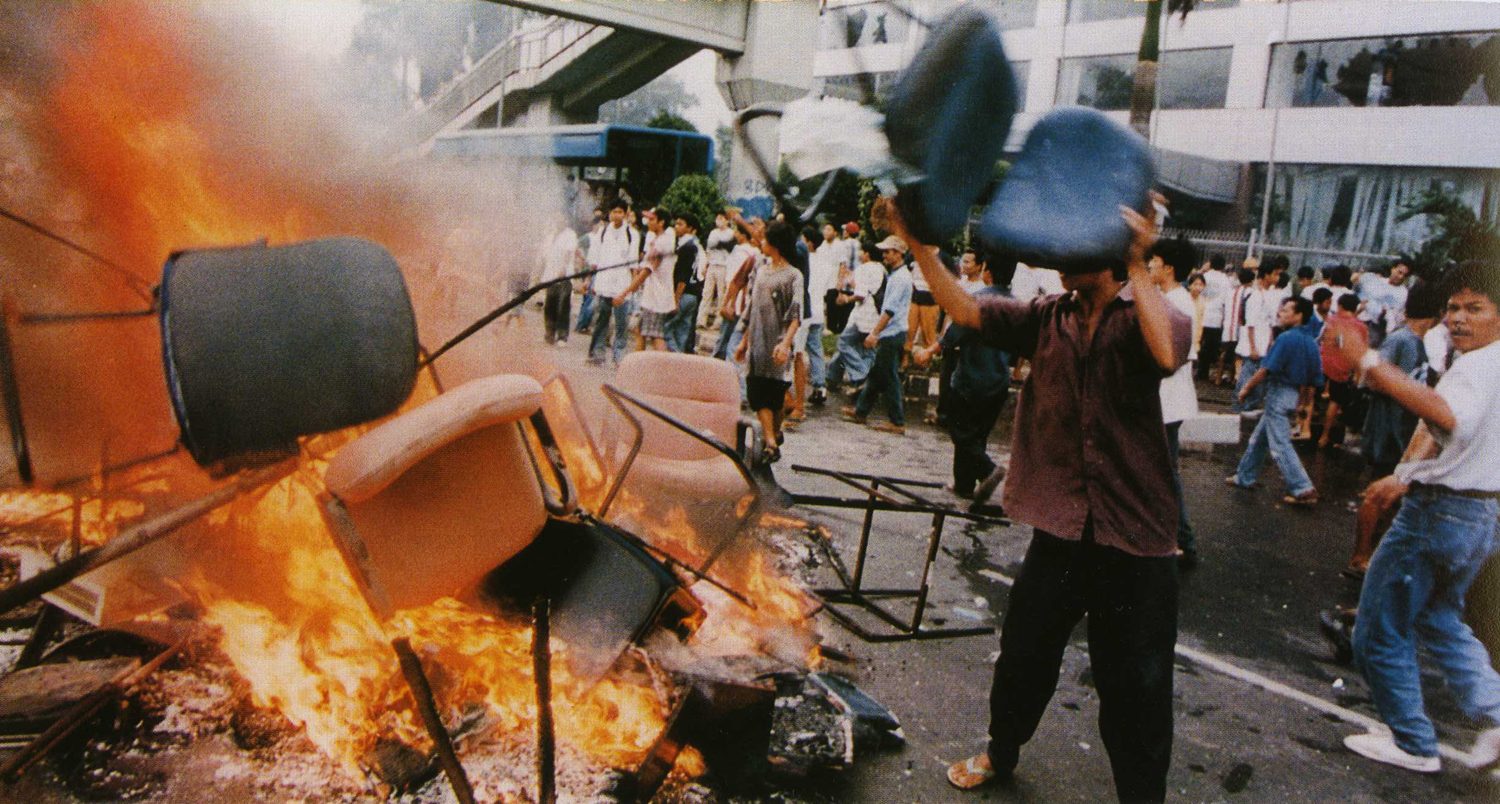
Anti-Chinese sentiment reached its peak in May 1998, when major riots swept over Jakarta.

The Dutch introduced anti-Chinese laws in the Dutch East Indies. The Dutch colonialists started the first massacre of Chinese in the 1740 Batavia massacre in which tens of thousands died. The Java War (1741–43) followed shortly thereafter.

The asymmetrical economic position between ethnic Chinese Indonesians and indigenous Indonesians has incited anti-Chinese sentiment among the poorer majorities. During the Indonesian killings of 1965–66, in which more than 500,000 people died (mostly non-Chinese Indonesians), ethnic Chinese were killed and their properties looted and burned as a result of anti-Chinese racism on the excuse that Dipa "Amat" Aidit had brought the PKI closer to China. In the May 1998 riots of Indonesia following the fall of President Suharto, many ethnic Chinese were targeted by other Indonesian rioters, resulting in extensive looting. However, when Chinese-owned supermarkets were targeted for looting most of the dead were not ethnic Chinese, but the looters themselves, who were burnt to death by the hundreds when a fire broke out.

==== Myanmar ====
Chinese people in Myanmar have also been subject to discriminatory laws and rhetoric in Burmese media and popular culture.

==== Thailand ====
Historically, Thailand (known as Siam before 1939) has been seen as a China-friendly country, owing to close Chinese-Siamese relations, a large proportion of the Thai population being of Chinese descent and Chinese having been assimilated into mainstream society over the years.

In 1914, King Vajiravudh (Rama VI) originated the phrase "Jews of the Orient" to describe Chinese. He published an essay using Western antisemitic tropes to characterize Chinese as "vampires who steadily suck dry an unfortunate victim's lifeblood" because of their perceived lack of loyalty to Siam and the fact that they sent money back to China.

During 1930s to 1950s, Prime Minister Plaek Phibunsongkhram launched a massive Thaification, the main purpose of which was Central Thai supremacy, including the oppression of Thailand's Chinese population and restricting Thai Chinese culture by banning the teaching of the Chinese language and forcing Thai Chinese to adopt Thai names. Plaek's obsession with creating a pan-Thai nationalist agenda caused resentment among general officers (most of Thai general officers at the time were of Teochew background) until he was removed from office in 1944.

==== Vietnam ====
There are strong anti-Chinese sentiments among the Vietnamese population, stemming in part from a past thousand years of Chinese rule in Northern Vietnam. A long history of Sino-Vietnamese conflicts followed, with repeated wars over the centuries. Though current relations are peaceful, numerous wars were fought between the two nations in the past, from the time of the Early Lê dynasty (10th century) to the Sino-Vietnamese War from 1979 to 1989.

Shortly after the 1975 Vietnamese defeat of the United States in the Vietnam War, the Vietnamese government persecuted the Chinese community by confiscating property and businesses owned by overseas Chinese in Vietnam and expelling the ethnic Chinese minority into southern Chinese provinces. In February 1976, Vietnam implemented registration programs in the south. Ethnic Chinese in Vietnam were required to adopt Vietnamese citizenship or leave the country. In early 1977, Vietnam implemented what it described as a purification policy in its border areas to keep Chinese border residents to the Chinese side of the border. Following another discriminatory policy introduced in March 1978, a large number of Chinese fled from Vietnam to southern China. China and Vietnam attempted to negotiate issues related to Vietnam's treatment of ethnic Chinese, but these negotiations failed to resolve the issues. During the August 1978 Youyi Pass Incident, the Vietnamese army and police expelled 2,500 refugees across the border into China. Vietnamese authorities beat and stabbed refugees during the incident, including 9 Chinese civilian border workers. From 1978 to 1979, some 450,000 ethnic Chinese left Vietnam by boat (mainly former South Vietnam citizens fleeing the Vietcong) as refugees or were expelled across the land border with China.

The 1979 Sino-Vietnamese War resulted in part from Vietnam's mistreatment of the Hoa people.

==== Cambodia ====
The first anti-Chinese sentiment was witnessed in Cambodia during the Lon Nol regime. This was followed by the right-wing military dictatorship who made the Chinese carry special papers with them, often as a sign of Khmer supremacy. Although some Khmer Rouge members were ethnic Chinese (Khieu Samphan, Ieng Sary, Nuon Chea, Kaing Guek Eav, even Pol Pot himself - although he went to great lengths to conceal his Chinese ancestry), and were less wary about the Chinese than they were with the Vietnamese, they carried on the racial policies of Lon Nol, although more extreme. Ethnic Chinese were banned from speaking Chinese, and Chinese New Year was outlawed. When the Khmer Rouge were overthrown by a communist government under the influence of Vietnam, some anti-Chinese laws were lifted, but were still kept in place. The Khmer Rouge had managed to kill around 200,000 ethnic Chinese during their rule.

=== South Asia ===
==== India ====
During the Sino-Indian War, the Chinese faced hostile sentiment all over India. Chinese businesses were investigated for links to the Chinese government and many Chinese were interned in prisons in North India. The Indian government passed the Defence of India Act in December 1962, permitting the "apprehension and detention in custody of any person hostile to the country." The broad language of the act allowed for the arrest of any person simply for having a Chinese surname or a Chinese spouse. The Indian government incarcerated thousands of Chinese-Indians in an internment camp in Deoli, Rajasthan, where they were held for years without trial. The last internees were not released until 1967. Thousands more Chinese-Indians were forcibly deported or coerced to leave India. Nearly all internees had their properties sold off or looted. Even after their release, the Chinese Indians faced many restrictions on their freedom. They could not travel freely until the mid-1990s. India and China have cold relations and have been found to engage in anti-Indian works, such as cyber slavery in Myanmar, Cambodia and Laos. They also control US immigration mafia, like donkey routes which have led to deportations after US President Donald Trump began anti-immigration and deportation pushes.

=== Oceania ===
==== Australia ====
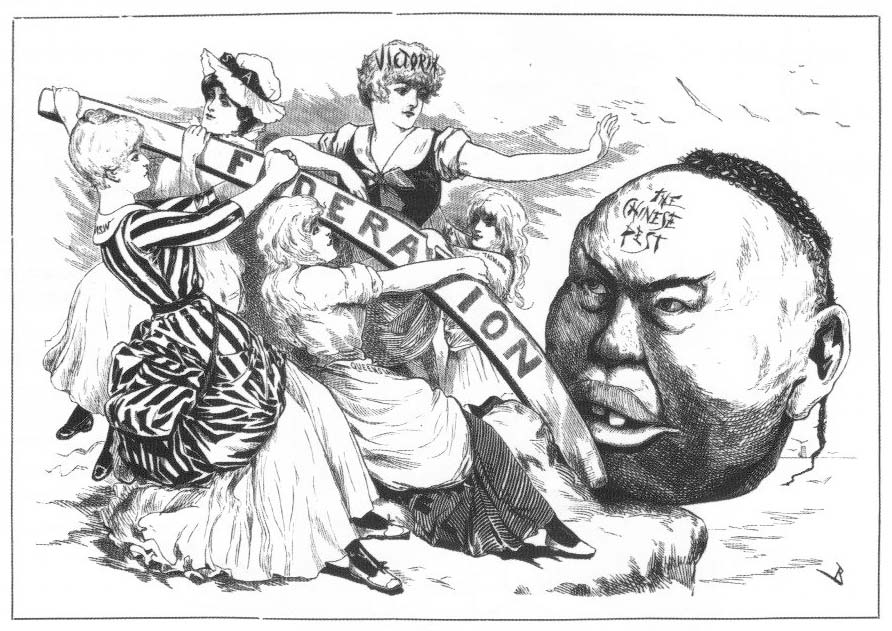
The White Australia policy arose from the growth of anti-Chinese sentiments that peaked in the late 19th and early 20th century. Pictured: The Melbourne Punch (c. May 1888)

The Chinese population was active in political and social life in Australia. Community leaders protested against discriminatory legislation and attitudes, and despite the passing of the Immigration Restriction Act in 1901, Chinese communities around Australia participated in parades and celebrations of Australia's Federation and the visit of the Duke and Duchess of York.

Although the Chinese communities in Australia were generally peaceful and industrious, resentment flared up against them because of their different customs and traditions. In the mid-19th century, terms such as "dirty, disease-ridden, [and] insect-like" were used in Australia and New Zealand to describe the Chinese.

The causes of friction in local Australian communities were not merely rooted in bigotry or fear (although these elements were also present), but were substantially based on negative effects communities were observing and experiencing independently everywhere. As occurred in much of the western world, Chinese labourers typically arrived with temporary migration intentions, undercut local workers, and regularly sent remittance to family who remained in China, rather than investing substantially in local communities.

A poll tax was passed in Victoria in 1855 to restrict Chinese immigration. New South Wales, Queensland and Western Australia followed suit. Such legislation did not distinguish between naturalised, British citizens, Australian-born, and Chinese-born individuals. The tax in Victoria and New South Wales was repealed in the 1860s.

In the 1870s and 1880s, the growing trade union movement began a series of protests against foreign labour. Their arguments were that Asians and Chinese took jobs away from white men, worked for "substandard" wages, lowered working conditions, and refused unionisation. Objections to these arguments came largely from wealthy land owners in rural areas. It was argued that without Asiatics to work in the tropical areas of the Northern Territory and Queensland, the area would have to be abandoned. Despite these objections to restricting immigration, between 1875 and 1888 all Australian colonies enacted legislation that excluded all further Chinese immigration.

In 1888, following protests and strike actions, an inter-colonial conference agreed to reinstate and increase the severity of restrictions on Chinese immigration. This provided the basis for the 1901 Immigration Restriction Act and the seed for the White Australia policy, which although relaxed over time, was not fully abandoned until the early 1970s.

The Chifley government's Darwin Lands Acquisition Act 1945 compulsorily acquired 53 acres (21 ha) of land owned by Chinese-Australians in Darwin, the capital of the Northern Territory, leading to the end of the local Chinatown. Two years earlier, the territory's administrator Aubrey Abbott had written to Joseph Carrodus, secretary of the Department of the Interior, proposing a combination of compulsory acquisition and conversion of the land to leasehold in order to effect "the elimination of undesirable elements which Darwin has suffered from far too much in the past" and stated that he hoped to "entirely prevent the Chinese quarter forming again". He further observed that "if land is acquired from the former Chinese residents there is really no need for them to return as they have no other assets". The territory's civilian population had mostly been evacuated during the war and the former Chinatown residents returned to find their homes and businesses reduced to rubble.

==== New Zealand ====
In the 1800s, Chinese citizens were encouraged to immigrate to New Zealand because they were needed to fulfill agricultural jobs during a time of white labor shortage. The arrival of foreign laborers was met with hostility and the formation of anti-Chinese immigrant groups, such as the Anti-Chinese League, the Anti-Asiatic League, the Anti-Chinese Association, and the White New Zealand League. Official discrimination began with the Chinese Immigrants Act of 1881, limiting Chinese emigration to New Zealand and excluding Chinese citizens from major jobs. Anti-Chinese sentiment had declined by the mid-20th century.

==== Papua New Guinea ====
In May 2009, during the Papua New Guinea riots, Chinese-owned businesses were looted by gangs in the capital city Port Moresby, amid simmering anti-Chinese sentiment reported in the country. There are fears that these riots will force many Chinese business owners and entrepreneurs to leave the South Pacific country, which would invariably lead to further damage on an impoverished economy that had an 80% unemployment rate. Thousands of people were reportedly involved in the riots.

==== Tonga ====
In 2000, Tongan noble Tu'ivakano of Nukunuku banned Chinese stores from his Nukunuku District in Tonga. This followed complaints from other shopkeepers regarding competition from local Chinese.

In 2006, rioters damaged shops owned by Chinese-Tongans in Nukuʻalofa.

==== Solomon Islands ====
In 2006, Honiara's Chinatown suffered damage when it was looted and burned by rioters following a contested election. Ethnic Chinese businessmen were falsely blamed for bribing members of the Solomon Islands' Parliament. The government of Taiwan was the one that supported the then-current government of the Solomon Islands. The Chinese businessmen were mainly small traders from mainland China and had no interest in local politics.

=== Europe ===
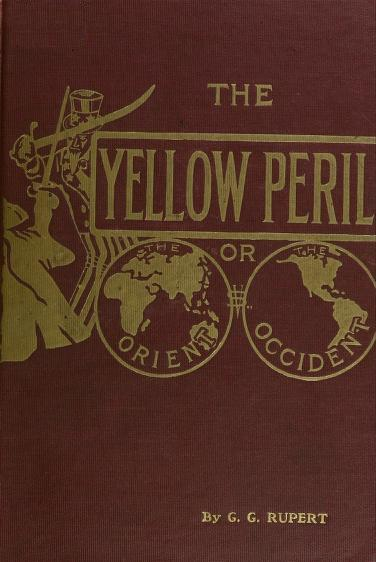
Cover of the third edition of G. G. Rupert's The Yellow Peril, depicting Uncle Sam engaged in a sword fight with a stereotypical pigtailed Chinese warrior

Anti-Chinese sentiment became more common as China was becoming a major source of immigrants for the west (including the Western United States). Numerous Chinese immigrants to North America were attracted by wages offered by large railway companies in the late 19th century as the companies built the transcontinental railroads.

Anti-Chinese policies persisted in the 20th century in the English-speaking world, including the Chinese Exclusion Act, the Chinese Immigration Act of 1923, anti-Chinese zoning laws and restrictive covenants, the policies of Richard Seddon, and the White Australia policy.

==== Finland ====
In 2025, Miss Finland Sarah Dzafce was stripped of her crown after a photo circulated online showing her making a racist gesture by pulling her eyes into a slanted shape with her fingers and including the Finnish-language text "kiinalaisenkaa syömäs" (roughly translated as "eating with a Chinese person"), which was widely interpreted as mocking Asian people. In response to the backlash, the pageant organizers said they do not tolerate racism and removed her title.

==== France ====
In France, there has been a long history of systemic racism towards the Chinese population, with many people stereotyping them as easy targets for crime. As a result, France's ethnic Chinese population have been common victims of racism and crime, which include assaults, robbery, and murder; it is common for Chinese business owners to have their businesses robbed and destroyed. There have been rising incidents of anti-Chinese racism in France; many Chinese, including French celebrity Frederic Chau, want more support from the French government. In September 2016, at least 15,000 Chinese participated in an anti-Asian racism protest in Paris.

===== Public opinion =====
According to a 2019 survey by Kantar Public for the Institut Montaigne, French citizens are increasingly aware of China's rise as a global power, though opinions vary by topic.

On perceived threat, 31% of respondents viewed China as a threat, compared with 35% for the United States and 44% for Russia. 81% considered China influential in global affairs and 47% thought China was influential in France, with 13% describing it as "very influential". When it came to digitalization and technology, a generational divide is apparent in French perceptions of China's technological development, with younger citizens, particularly those under 35, more likely to view China as surpassing France in these fields. Among respondents under age of 35, 55% considered China as being ahead, with 65.2% of those aged 18 to 24 sharing this view. Overall, 47% believed China was ahead of France, while 19% believed France was ahead and 29% viewed neither as ahead.

During COVID-19, a survey published in 2020 by the Pew Research Center found that 70% of French had an unfavourable view of China in that year. It also reported in that year that 48% in France regarded China as the "world's dominant economic power", compared with 34% for USA.

A survey published in 2026 by the Pew Research Center found that 58% of French people had an unfavorable view of China, while 36% had a favorable view. It also found that 51% of French people in the 18–35 age group had positive opinions of China.

==== Germany ====
In 2016, Günther Oettinger, the former European Commissioner for Digital Economy and Society, called Chinese people derogatory names, including "sly dogs", in a speech to executives in Hamburg and refused to apologize for several days.

A survey published in 2026 by the Pew Research Center found that 33% of Germans had a favorable view of China, while 64% had an unfavorable view.

==== Italy ====
Although historical relations between two were friendly and even Marco Polo paid a visit to China, during the Boxer Rebellion, Italy was part of Eight-Nation Alliance against the rebellion, thus this had stemmed anti-Chinese sentiment in Italy. Italian troops looted, burnt, and stole a lot of Chinese goods to Italy, many are still being displayed in Italian museums.

The 1969 hit song Arrivano i cinesi (the Chinese are coming) by Bruno Lauzi used anti-Chinese racism to criticize Italians who drew political inspiration from the Maoist model, describing them as "getting all yellow," and singing that they would soon turn "small, fast, and mute" if they kept obsessing over their "special book" (Quotations by Chairman Mao Zedong).

==== Netherlands ====
A survey published in 2026 by the Pew Research Center found that 34% of Dutch people had a favorable view of China, while 59% had an unfavorable view. It also found that 49% of Dutch people in the 18-35 age group had positive opinions of China.

==== Portugal ====
In the 16th century, increasing sea trades between Europe to China had led Portuguese merchants to China, however Portuguese military ambitions for power and its fear of China's interventions and brutality had led to the growth of sinophobia in Portugal. Galiote Pereira, a Portuguese Jesuit missionary who was imprisoned by Chinese authorities, claimed China's juridical treatment known as bastinado was so horrible as it hit on human flesh, becoming the source of fundamental anti-Chinese sentiment later; as well as brutality, the cruelty of China and Chinese tyranny. With the Ming dynasty's brutal reactions on Portuguese merchants following the conquest of Malacca, sinophobia became widespread in Portugal, and widely practiced until the First Opium War, which the Qing dynasty was forced to cede Macao to Portugal. (Note: Macao was a trading outpost of Portugal since the 1600s in an agreement between China and Portugal, as a non-sovereign holding of the Portuguese empire. The "cession" referred to here is that the sovereignty of Macao was ceded for the first time by China to Portugal after the defeat in the Opium Wars.)

==== Spain ====
Spain first issued anti-Chinese legislation when Limahong, a Chinese pirate, attacked Spanish settlements in the Philippines. One of his famous actions was a failed invasion of Manila in 1574, which he launched with the support of Chinese and Moro pirates. The Spanish conquistadors massacred the Chinese or expelled them from Manila several times, notably the autumn 1603 massacre of Chinese in Manila, and the reasons for this uprising remain unclear. Its motives range from the desire of the Chinese to dominate Manila, to their desire to abort the Spaniards' moves which seemed to lead to their elimination. The Spaniards quelled the rebellion and massacred around 20,000 Chinese. The Chinese responded by fleeing to the Sultanate of Sulu and supporting the Moro Muslims in their war against the Spanish. The Chinese supplied the Moros with weapons and joined them in directly fighting against the Spanish during the Spanish–Moro conflict. Spain also upheld a plan to conquer China, but it never materialized.

A survey published in 2026 by the Pew Research Center found that 54% of Spaniards had a favorable view of China, while 39% had an unfavorable view. It also found that 65% of Spaniards in the 18-35 age group had positive opinions of China.

==== Sweden ====
A survey published in 2026 by the Pew Research Center found that 71% of Swedes had an unfavorable view of China, while 27% had a favorable view. It also found that 37% of the people in the 18-35 age group had positive opinions of China.

==== United Kingdom ====
15% of ethnic Chinese reported racial harassment in 2016, which was the highest percentage out of all ethnic minorities in the UK. The Chinese community has been victims of racially aggravated attacks and murders, verbal accounts of racism, and vandalism. There is also a lack of reporting on anti-Chinese discrimination in the UK, notably violence against Chinese Britons.

The ethnic slur "chink" has been used against the Chinese community; Dave Whelan, the former owner of Wigan Athletic F.C., was fined £50,000 and suspended for six weeks by The Football Association after using the term in an interview; Kerry Smith resigned as an election candidate after it was reported he used similar language.

Professor Gary Craig from Durham University carried out research about the Chinese population in the UK, and concluded that hate crimes against the Chinese community are getting worse, adding that British Chinese people experience "perhaps even higher levels of racial violence or harassment than those experienced by any other minority group but that the true extent to their victimization is often overlooked because victims were unwilling to report it." Official police victim statistics put Chinese people in a group that includes other ethnicities, making it difficult to understand the extent of the crimes against the Chinese community.

A survey published in 2026 by the Pew Research Center found that 52% of British people had an unfavorable view of China, while 46% had a favorable view. It also found that 54% of the people in the 18-35 age group had positive opinions of China. 37% had confidence in Chinese leader Xi Jinping compared to 59% who did not; 46% of British people aged 18–35 had confidence in Xi.

==== Ukraine ====
In a 2019 poll by the Pew Research Center, 57% of Ukrainians held a favourable view towards China while 14% held an unfavourable view. An opinion poll conducted by the Razumkov Centre in February–March 2023 showed that 60% of Ukrainians surveyed had a negative view of China. Another Razumkov Centre poll conducted in January 2024 had 72.5% of Ukrainian respondents expressing a negative view of China, which was only less than 3 other countries: Iran (82%), Belarus (87%), and Russia (95%). 64% expressed a negative view of Xi Jinping in the 2024 poll.

According to a March 2022 Internet survey conducted by the Central European Institute of Asian Studies, Ukraine was negatively perceived by 46% of Chinese respondents. Few polls had asked Chinese respondents their views of Ukraine, but prior to Russia's invasion, Ukrainian opinion appeared to have been far more positive towards China than the reverse.

In a Carter Center online survey conducted between March and April 2022, 75% of Chinese respondents agreed that supporting Russia in the "Russo-Ukrainian conflict" serves China's national interest; 61% said the best course of action for China is moral support for Russia. An Internet survey conducted by the University of California, San Diego during the same period had 40% of Chinese respondents supporting Russia, 25% expressing opposition, and 35% remaining neutral, with 69% of respondents preferring that China stays neutral or silent in terms of its actual position. According to a November 2022 Genron NPO poll on Chinese peoples' views of the invasion, 39.5% of respondents said "the Russian actions are not wrong" compared to 50.6% of respondents recognising the Russian actions as wrong, but 29% of the latter group added that "the circumstances should be considered."

According to the end of year survey by Gallup International, 80% of Ukrainians have a negative view of China's leader Xi Jinping. The study notes that 40% of Ukrainians have a very negative view, and 40% have a rather negative view. Only 10% had a positive view, while the other 10% were undecided.

=== Americas ===
==== Canada ====
In the 1850s, sizable numbers of Chinese immigrants came to British Columbia during the gold rush; the region was known to them as Gold Mountain. Starting in 1858, Chinese coolies were brought to Canada to work in the mines and on the Canadian Pacific Railway. However, they were denied by law the rights of citizenship, including the right to vote, and in the 1880s, "head taxes" were implemented to curtail immigration from China. In 1907, a riot in Vancouver targeted Chinese and Japanese-owned businesses. In 1923, the federal government banned Chinese immigration outright, passing the Chinese Immigration Act, commonly known as the Exclusion Act, prohibiting further Chinese immigration except under "special circumstances". The Exclusion Act was repealed in 1947, the same year in which Chinese Canadians were given the right to vote. Restrictions would continue to exist on immigration from Asia until 1967 when all racial restrictions on immigration to Canada were repealed, and Canada adopted the current points-based immigration system. On June 22, 2006, Prime Minister Stephen Harper offered an apology and compensation only for the head tax once paid by Chinese immigrants. Survivors or their spouses were paid approximately CA$20,000 in compensation.

==== Mexico ====
Anti-Chinese sentiment was first recorded in Mexico in 1880s. Similar to most Western countries at the time, Chinese immigration and its large business involvement have always been a fear for native Mexicans. Violence against Chinese occurred such as in Sonora, Baja California and Coahuila, the most notable was the Torreón massacre.

==== Peru ====
Peru was a popular destination for Chinese slaves in the 19th century, as part of the wider blackbirding phenomenon, due to the need in Peru for a military and laborer workforce. However, relations between Chinese workers and Peruvian owners have been tense, due to the mistreatment of Chinese laborers and anti-Chinese discrimination in Peru.

Due to the Chinese support for Chile throughout the War of the Pacific, relations between Peruvians and Chinese became increasingly tenser in the aftermath. After the war, armed indigenous peasants sacked and occupied haciendas of landed elite criollo "collaborationists" in the central Sierra – the majority of them were of ethnic Chinese, while indigenous and mestizo Peruvians murdered Chinese shopkeepers in Lima; in response to Chinese coolies revolted and even joined the Chilean Army. Even in the 20th century, the memory of Chinese support for Chile was so deep that Manuel A. Odría, once dictator of Peru, issued a ban against Chinese immigration as a punishment for their betrayal.

==== United States ====
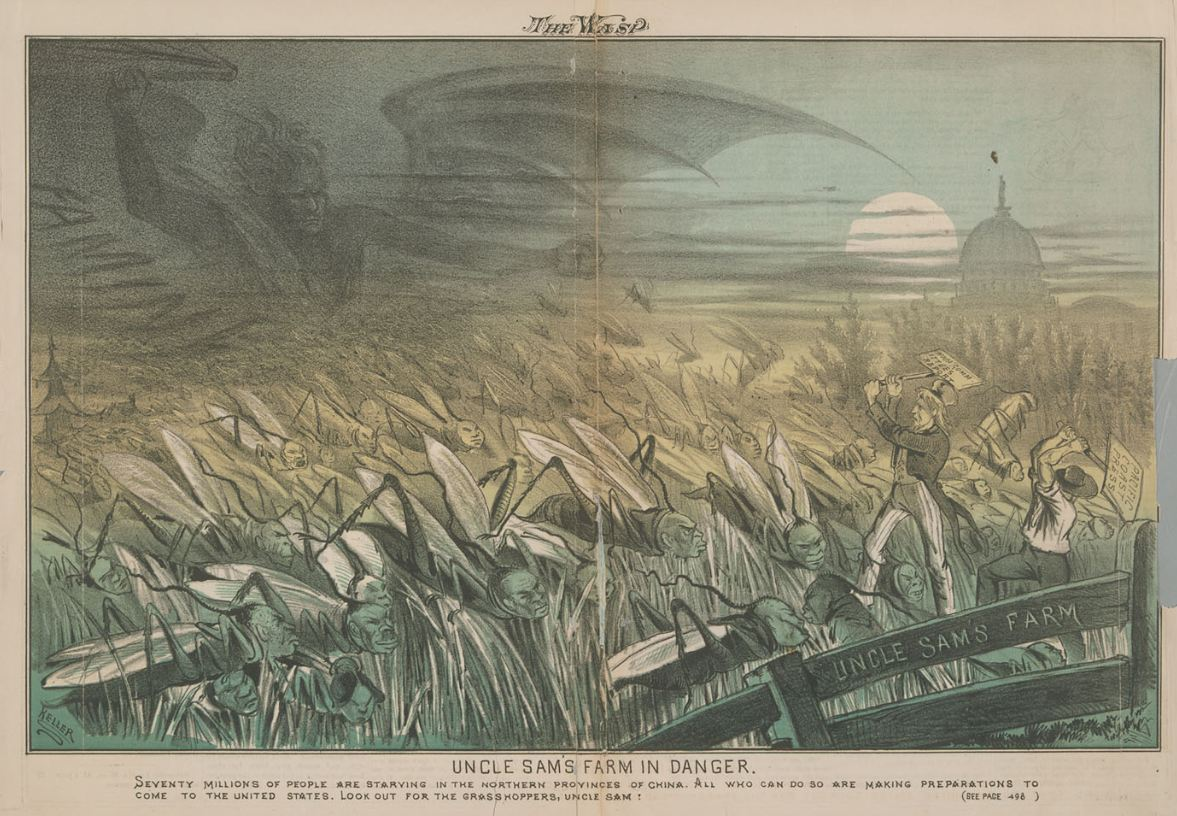
Chinese immigrants portrayed as locusts invading Uncle Sam's farm, fleeing the shadow of famine, 1878

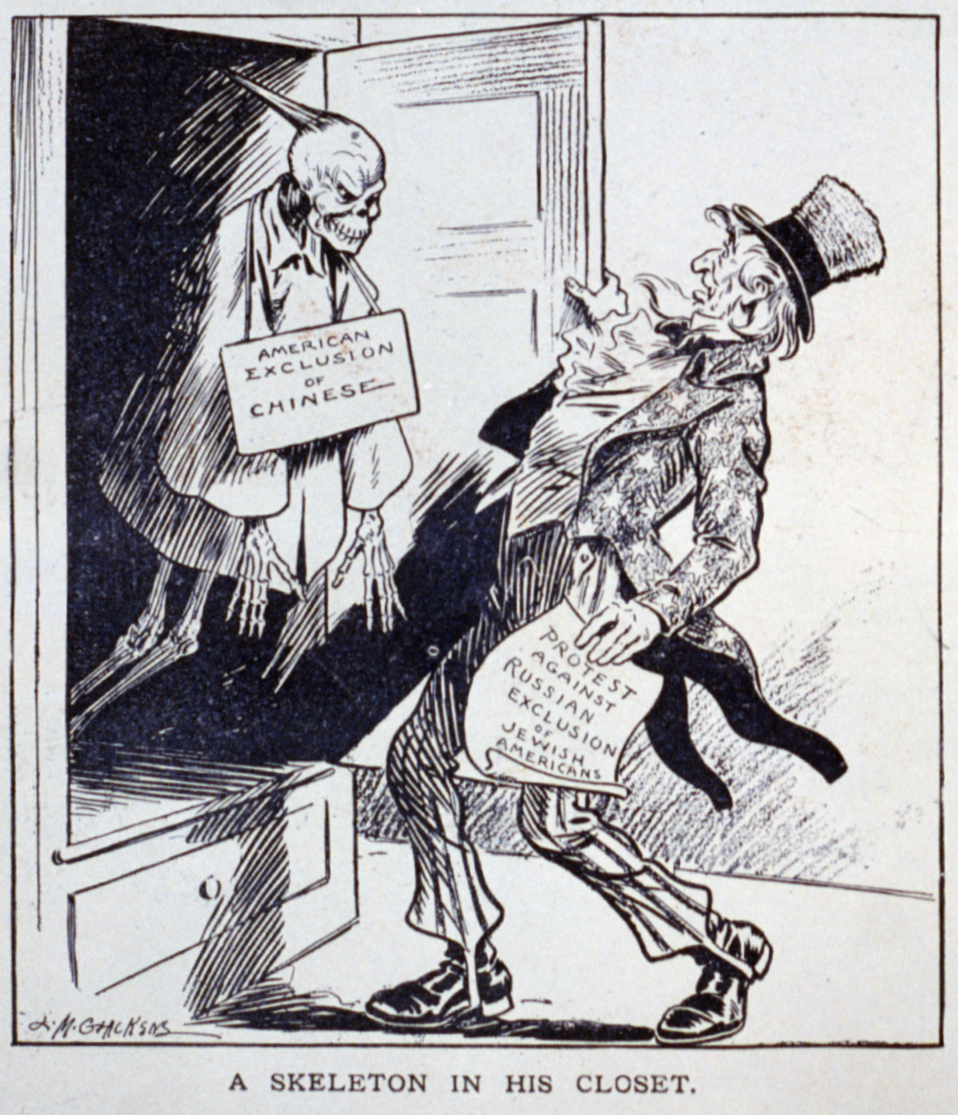
A political cartoon criticizing the United States' protest against the anti-Jewish pogroms in the Russian Empire despite the Chinese Exclusion Act

Starting with the California gold rush in the 19th century, the United States—particularly the West Coast states—imported large numbers of Chinese migrant laborers. Employers believed that the Chinese were "reliable" workers who would continue working, without complaint, even under harsh conditions. The migrant workers encountered considerable prejudice in the United States, especially among the people who occupied the lower layers of white society, because Chinese "coolies" were used as scapegoats for depressed wage levels by politicians and labor leaders. Cases of physical assaults on the Chinese include the Los Angeles Chinese massacre of 1871. The 1909 murder of Elsie Sigel in New York, for which a Chinese person was suspected, was blamed on the Chinese in general and it immediately led to physical violence against them. "The murder of Elsie Sigel immediately grabbed the front pages of newspapers, which portrayed Chinese men as dangerous to "innocent" and "virtuous" young white women. This murder led to a surge in the harassment of Chinese in communities across the United States."

The emerging American trade unions, under such leaders as Samuel Gompers, also took an outspoken anti-Chinese position, regarding Chinese laborers as competitors to white laborers. Only with the emergence of the international trade union, IWW, did trade unionists start to accept Chinese workers as part of the American working class.

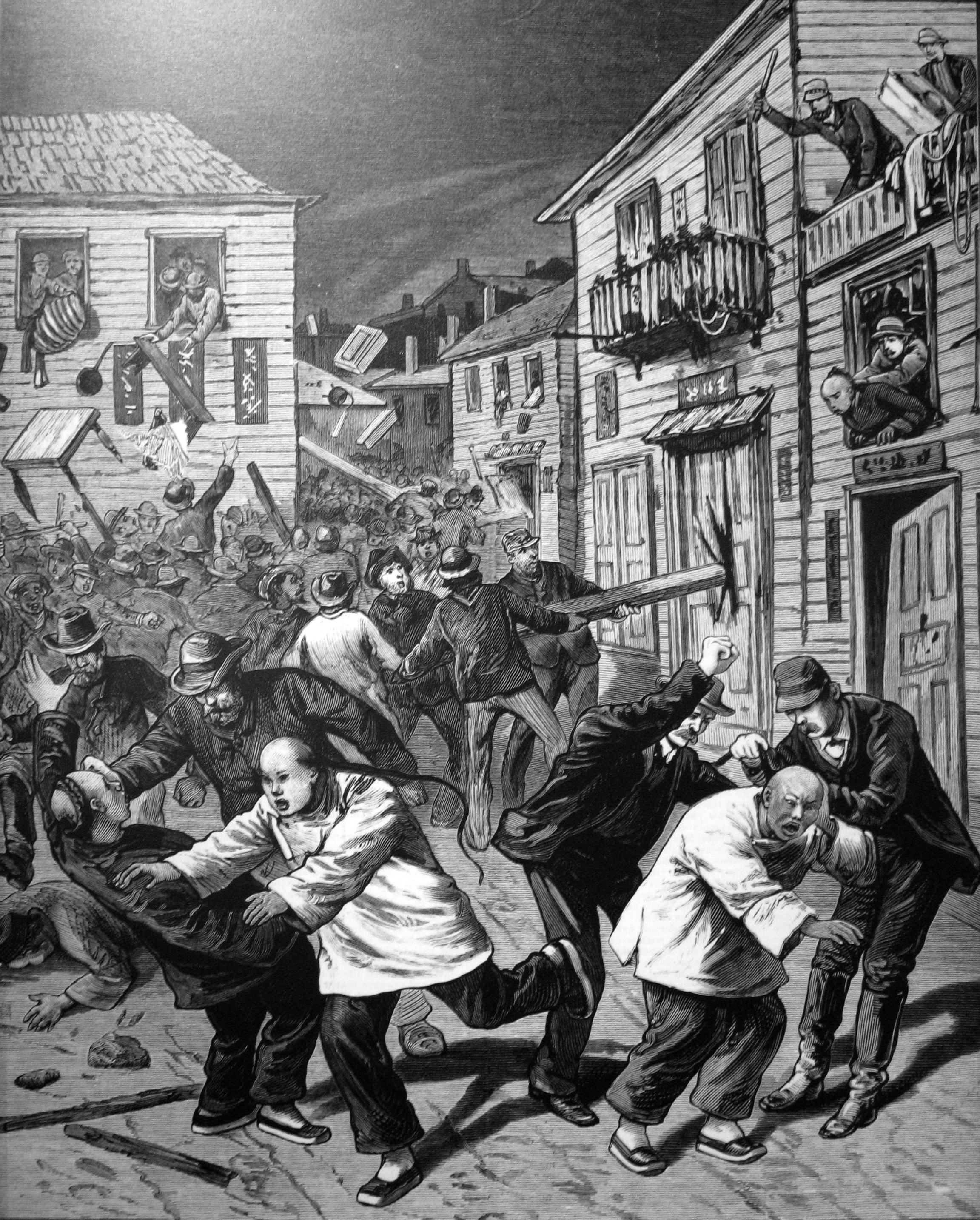
Denver's anti-Chinese riot in 1880

In the 1870s and 1880s, various legal discriminatory measures were taken against the Chinese. These laws, in particular, the Chinese Exclusion Act of 1882, were aimed at restricting further immigration from China, although the laws were later repealed by the Chinese Exclusion Repeal Act of 1943. In particular, even in his lone dissent against Plessy v. Ferguson (1896), then-Supreme Court Justice John Marshall Harlan wrote of the Chinese as: "a race so different from our own that we do not permit those belonging to it to become citizens of the United States. Persons belonging to it are, with few exceptions, absolutely excluded from our country. I allude to the Chinese race."

In April 2008, CNN's Jack Cafferty remarked: "We continue to import their junk with the lead paint on them and the poisoned pet food [...] So I think our relationship with China has certainly changed. I think they're basically the same bunch of goons and thugs they've been for the last 50 years." At least 1,500 Chinese Americans protested outside CNN's Hollywood offices in response while a similar protest took place at CNN headquarters in Atlanta.

=== Africa ===
==== Angola ====
During the July 2025 Angolan protests, dozens of Chinese-owned retail shops were looted and thousands of Chinese nationals fled the country.

==== South Africa ====
While the date of the first Chinese arrivals to Africa is contested, evidence from the Cape of Good Hope's refreshment station, in modern-day South Africa, indicates that Chinese convicts and slaves of the Dutch East India Company (VOC) arrived in the early 1650s. The Cape was used by the VOC as a penal settlement for criminals and exiles from the East Indies, including men from China. They were not incarcerated but instead put to work and were designated as "free blacks" after the terms of their incarceration had ended. The local Dutch and other white settlers were dispelled with the growth of early Chinese settlement and regulated them to a segregated neighborhood and burial ground. White settlers also introduced legislation to curb the activities of Chinese businesses out of fear that they would harm white traders. They also could not own land or real estate, had to pay fees to own a business, and had no rights as citizens.

The importation to work in South African mines in the early 20th Century also stoked Anti-Chinese sentiment in the country. 60,000 Chinese laborers were brought to work in the Witwatersrand gold mines in South Africa between 1904 and 1910 in order to solve a native-labor shortage after the Boer war as the result of African laborer's resistance to returning to the mines where wages had been slashed and working conditions remained oppressive and because white unskilled labor was deemed too costly. Poor Afrikaners, as white unemployment remained high, blamed the Chinese workers and mine owners for keeping them poor and taking jobs away from them. Others against Chinese migration and work in the mines, argued that Asian migrants would eventually settle and become involved in trade, displacing white traders. The increasing opposition led to the phasing out of Chinese workers between 1907 and 1910.

Under South African apartheid, Chinese residents were classified as "Coloured," and were subject to apartheid legislation such as the Group Areas Act 41 of 1950, the Immigrants Regulation Amendment Act 43 of 1953, the Prohibition of Mixed Marriages Act 55 of 1949, the Immorality Amendment Acts of 1951 and 1957, and the Reservation of Separate Amenities Act 49 of 1953. They were unable to vote until 1994, and needed permits to acquire or occupy property in white areas until 1985. Until the 1970s, Chinese South Africans were unable to own property, forcing them to rent from landlords and neighbors, which put them in a precarious position and made them vulnerable to exploitation, eviction, and prosecution.

During the COVID-19 pandemic, anti-Chinese graffiti proliferated in South Africa which was fueled by the use of names like "China Virus," "Wuhan Virus," "Chinese flue," "Asian flue," and "Kung flue" to refer to the virus and the misinformation and conspiracy theories that circulated regarding the origins of COVID-19.

== Anti-Han sentiment ==
Anti-Han sentiment refers to fear or dislike of ethnic Han people. It includes hostility towards Han Taiwanese as well as mainland Han Chinese. Given that Han people make up the overwhelming majority of China's population, the anti-Han sentiment is closely related to the anti-Chinese sentiment.

== Historical acts of Sinophobic violence ==
List of non-Chinese "sinophobia-led" acts of violence against ethnic Chinese:

=== Australia ===
- Lambing Flat riots
- Buckland Riot

=== Canada ===
- Vancouver anti-Chinese riots, 1886
- Vancouver anti-Asian riots, 1907

=== Mexico ===
- Torreón massacre

=== Mongolia ===
- Mongol conquest of China
- Deportation of Chinese people to China in the 1960's
- Attacks against Chinese by the Tsagaan Khas

=== Indonesia ===
- 1740 Batavia massacre
- 1918 Kudus riot
- Mergosono massacre
- Indonesian mass killings of 1965–66
- 1967 Mangkuk Merah Tragedy
- 1980 Jawa Tengah Racial Riot
- Situbondo Riot
- Banjarmasin riot of May 1997
- May 1998 riots of Indonesia
- November 2016 Jakarta protests

=== Malaysia ===
- 13 May incident

=== Japan ===
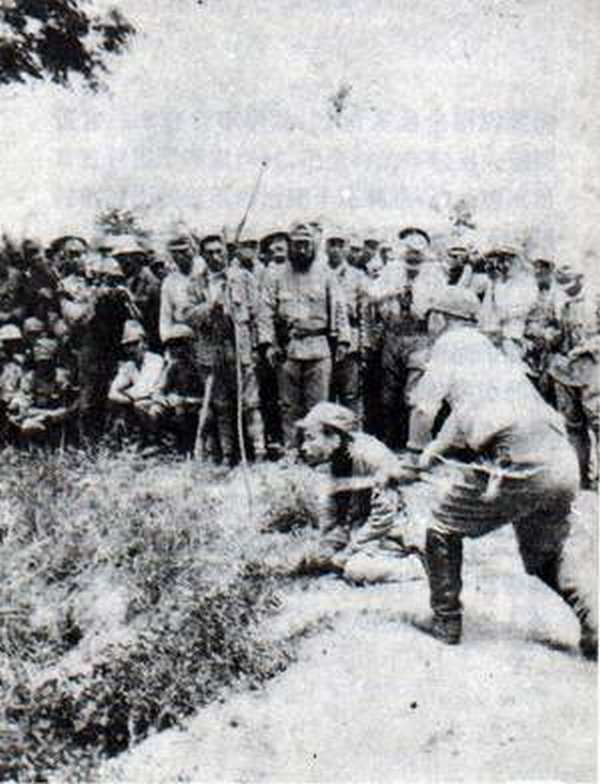
Japanese war crimes against Chinese POWs in Nanjing, c. 1937

- Nanjing Massacre
- Sook Ching massacre
- Unit 731

=== Korea under Japanese rule ===
- Wanpaoshan Incident, on July 1, 1931

=== Russia ===
- 1900 Amur anti-Chinese pogroms

=== United States ===
- Chinese massacre of 1871
- Rock Springs massacre
- Issaquah riot of 1885
- 1885 Pierce City lynching
- Tacoma riot of 1885
- Seattle riot of 1886
- Hells Canyon Massacre
- Anti-Chinese violence in California
- Denver Riot of 1880
- Killing of Vincent Chin

=== Vietnam ===
- 1782 Saigon massacre

== Derogatory terms ==
There are a variety of derogatory terms for Chinese people. Many of these terms are racist.

=== In English ===
- Chinaman – the term Chinaman is noted as offensive by modern dictionaries, dictionaries of slurs and euphemisms, and guidelines for racial harassment.
- Ching chong – Used to mock people of Chinese descent and the Chinese language, or other East and Southeast Asian-looking people in general.
- Ching chang chong – same usage as 'ching chong'.
- Chink – a racial slur referring to a person of Chinese ethnicity, but could be directed towards anyone of East and Southeast Asian descent in general.
- Chinky – the name "Chinky" is the adjectival form of Chink and, like Chink, is an ethnic slur for Chinese occasionally directed towards other East and Southeast Asian people.
- Chonky – refers to a person of Chinese heritage with white attributes whether being a personality aspect or physical aspect.
- Coolie – means laborer in reference to Chinese manual workers in the 19th and early 20th century.
- Slope – used to mock people of Chinese descent and the sloping shape of their skull, or other East Asians. Used commonly during the Vietnam War.
- Panface – used to mock the flat facial features of the Chinese and other people of East and Southeast Asian descent.
- Lingling – used to call someone of Chinese descent in the West.
- Gook - It is used as an insult against individuals from nations such as Korea, Vietnam, the Philippines, and other parts of Asia. The term was frequently used by United States military personnel during conflicts in Asia and the Pacific, including the Philippine–American War, the Korean War, and the Vietnam War

=== In Filipino ===
- Intsik (Cebuan: Insik) is used to refer to refer people of Chinese ancestry including Chinese Filipinos. (The standard term is Tsino, derived from the Spanish chino, with the colloquial Tsinoy referring specifically to Chinese Filipinos.) The originally neutral term recently gained negative connotation with the increasing preference of Chinese Filipinos not to be referred to as Intsik. The term originally came from in chiek, a Hokkien term referring to one's uncle. The term has variations, which may be more offensive in tone such as Intsik baho and may used in a derogatory phrase, Intsik baho tulo-laway ("Smelly old Chinaman with drooling saliva").
- Tsekwa (sometimes spelled chekwa) – is a slang term used by the Filipinos to refer to Chinese people.

=== In French ===
- Chinetoque (m/f) – derogatory term referring to Asian people, especially of those from China and Vietnam.

=== In Indonesian ===
- Chitato – (China Tanpa Toko) – literally "Chinese people don't have shops" referring to ridicule for Indonesian Chinese descent who do not own shops.
- Aseng – A play on the word "asing" which means "foreigner" is used by local natives in Indonesia for Chinese descent.
- Panlok (Panda lokal/local panda) – derogatory term referring to Chinese female or female who look like Chinese, particularly prostitutes.

=== In Japanese ===
- Dojin (土人, dojin) – literally "earth people", referring either neutrally to local folk or derogatorily to indigenous peoples and savages, used towards the end of the 19th century and early 20th century by Japanese colonists, to imply the backwardsness of Chinese people.
- Shina (支那 or シナ, shina) – Japanese reading of the Chinese character compound "支那" (Zhina in Mandarin Chinese), originally a Chinese transcription of an Indic name for China that entered East Asia with the spread of Buddhism. This toponym quickly became a racial marker with the rise of Japanese imperialism, and it is still considered derogatory, as is 'shina-jin'. The slur is also extended toward left-wing activists by right-wing people.
- Chankoro – derogatory term originating from a corruption of the Taiwanese Hokkien pronunciation of 清國奴 Chheng-kok-lô͘, used to refer to any "Chinaman", with a meaning of "Qing dynasty's slave".

=== In Korean ===
- Jjangkkae (Korean: 짱깨) – the Korean pronunciation of 掌櫃 (zhǎngguì), literally "shopkeeper", originally referring to owners of Chinese restaurants and stores; derogatory term referring to Chinese people.
- Jjangkkolla (Korean: 짱꼴라) – this term has originated from Japanese term chankoro (淸國奴; lit. "slave of Qing Manchurian"). Later, it became a derogatory term that indicates people in China.
- Orangkae (Korean: 오랑캐) – literally "Barbarian", derogatory term used against Chinese, Mongolian and Manchus.
- Doenom (Korean: 되놈) – Originally a demeaning word for Jurchen, meaning something similar to 'barbarian'. The Jurchens invaded Joseon in 1636 and caused long-term hatred. A Jurchen group later made the Qing dynasty, causing some Koreans to generalize the word to China as a whole.
- Ttaenom (Korean: 때놈) – literally "dirt bastard", referring to the perceived "dirtiness" of Chinese people, who some believe do not wash themselves. It was originally Dwoenom but changed over time to Ddaenom.

=== In Mongolian ===
- Hujaa (Mongolian: хужаа) – derogatory term referring to Chinese people.
- Jungaa – a derogatory term for Chinese people referring to the Chinese language.

=== In Portuguese ===
- Pastel de flango (Chicken pastry) - it is a derogatory term ridiculing Chinese pronunciation of Portuguese language (changing R by L). This derogatory term is sometimes used in Brazil to refer to Chinese people.

=== In Russian ===
- Kitayoza (Russian: китаёза kitayóza) (m/f) – derogatory term referring to Chinese people.
- Uzkoglazy (Russian: узкоглазый uzkoglázy) (m) – generic derogatory term referring to Chinese people (lit. 'narrow-eyed').

=== In Spanish ===
- Chino cochino – (coe-chee-noe, N.A. "cochini", SPAN "cochino", literally meaning "pig") is an outdated derogatory term meaning dirty Chinese. Cochina is the feminine form of the word.

=== In Italian ===
- Muso giallo – "yellow muzzle/yellow face", this term was used in an early 20th century play regarding Italian miners. Although it was not directed toward a Chinese person, but rather from one Italian to another, its existence nevertheless attested to the perceived 'otherness' of Chinese laborers within Italy. The slur is used as an equivalent of "gook" or "zipperhead" in Italian dubs of English films.

=== In Thai ===
- Chek/Jek (Thai: เจ๊ก) – derogatory term referring to Chinese people.

=== In Vietnamese ===
- Tàu – literally "boat". It is used to refer to Chinese people in general, and can be construed as derogatory but very rarely does. This usage is derived from the fact that many Chinese refugees came to Vietnam in boats during the Qing dynasty.
- Khựa – (meaning dirty) derogatory term for Chinese people and combination of two words above is called Tàu Khựa, which is a common word.
- Chệc – (ethnic slur, derogatory) Chink
- Chệch (Note: Alternative form of Chệc.) – (ethnic slur, derogatory) Chink, seldom used in actual spoken Vietnamese, but occurs in some translations as an equivalent of English Chink.

== Sinophobia during the COVID-19 pandemic ==
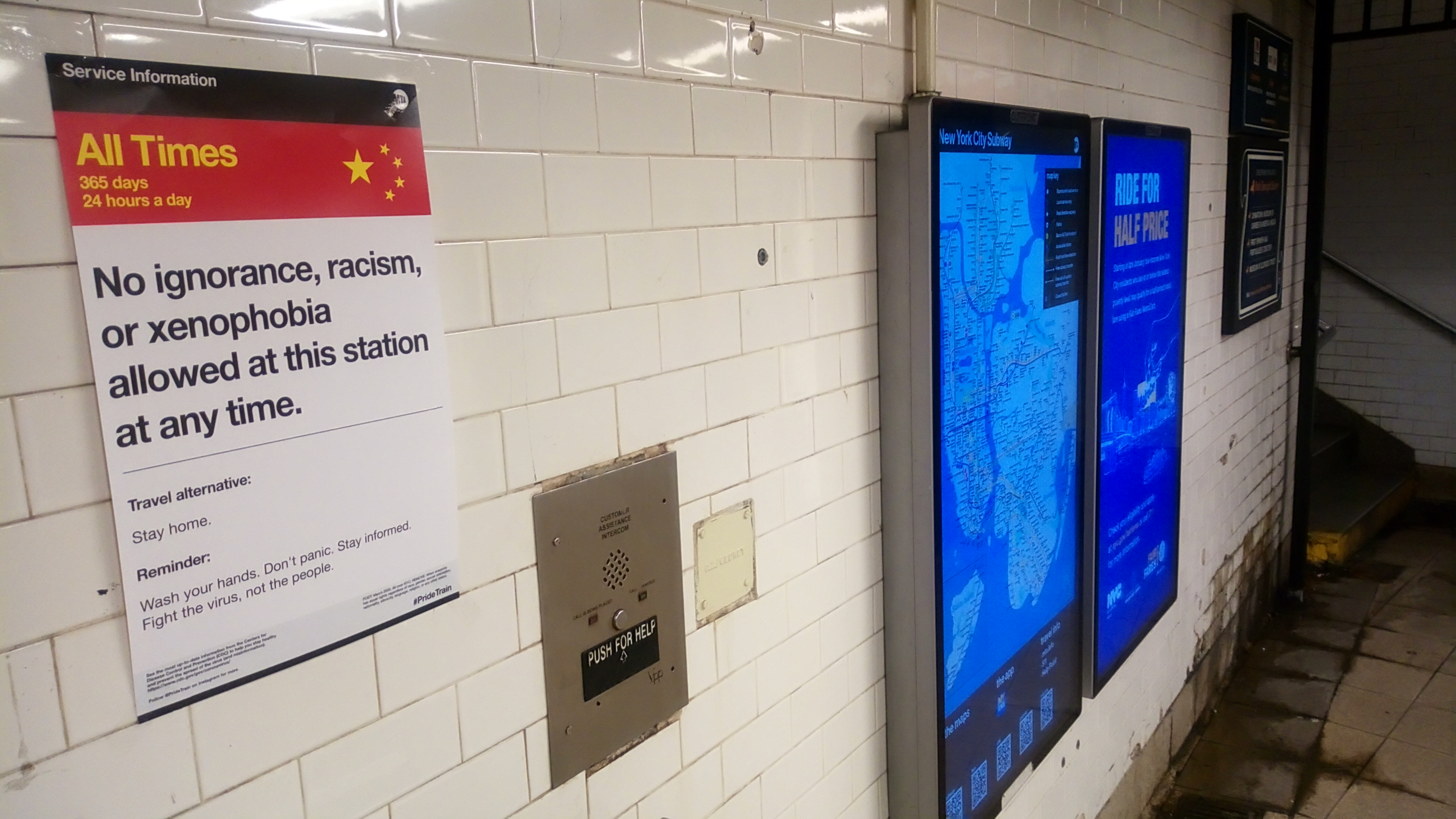
An unofficial anti-xenophobia poster at a New York City Subway station amidst the COVID-19 pandemic

The COVID-19 pandemic, in which the virus was first detected in Wuhan, has caused prejudice and racism against people of Chinese ancestry; some people stated that Chinese people deserve to contract it. The prevalence of this sentiment led to multiple acts of severe violence against people of Chinese ancestry, and it also led to multiple acts of violence against those who were wrongly supposed to have been of Chinese ancestry.

During the COVID-19 pandemic, the victims of the violence and the verbal abuse ranged from toddlers to the elderly, school children and their parents. They were not just mainland Chinese: they were also Taiwanese, Hong Kongers, members of the Chinese diaspora and other Asians who are either mistaken for or associated with them.

Several citizens across the globe also demanded a ban on Chinese people from their countries. Racist abuse and assaults against Asian groups have also increased in both the UK and the US. Then U.S. President Donald Trump also repeatedly called the coronavirus the 'Chinese virus'; however, he denied the fact that the term had a racist connotation.

== See also ==
- Anti-Korean sentiment
- Anti-Mongolian sentiment
