= Chinaman (disambiguation) =

Chinaman is an archaic term for a Chinese person.

Chinaman or Chinamen may also refer to:

== Arts and entertainment ==
=== Literature ===
- The Chinaman (1999), a collection of poems by David Mamet
- The Chinaman (novel), a 1992 novel by Stephen Leather adapted for the screenplay of the 2017 film The Foreigner
- The Chinese, a 2007 novel in Swedish by Henning Mankell, published in English translation in 2010 as The Man from Beijing
- Chinaman: The Legend of Pradeep Mathew, a 2010 novel by Shehan Karunatilaka

=== Music ===
- The Chinaman (album), 1992 album by 2 Live Crew member Fresh Kid Ice on Chinaman Records
- "Chinaman", a nickname of rapper Fresh Kid Ice (Chris Wong Won)

=== Other arts ===
- Chinaman, the English title of the Danish film Kinamand
- Chinamen (1970), a play in Michael Frayn's The Two of Us
- "The Chinaman", stage name of American comedian Mark Britten
- Kinamand, a 2005 Danish film whose title translates as Chinaman

== Places ==
- Chinaman Island, an uninhabited island located in Western Port, Victoria, Australia
- Chinaman Mortar Site in Tuolumne County, California
- Chinaman's Peak, former name of Ha Ling Peak, Mount Lawrence Grassi, Alberta, Canada
- Chinaman's Hat, common name of Mokoliʻi, a basalt island in Kāneʻohe Bay, Hawaii

== Other uses ==
- Chinaman (politics), an epithet for political backers in Chicago, Illinois, U.S., in the 1900s
- Chinaman (porcelain), a dealer in porcelain and chinaware
- Chinaman (ship), any ship engaged in the Old China Trade in the 18th and 19th centuries
- Left-arm unorthodox spin, a style of cricket bowling previously known as a chinaman
- Chinaman's chance, a figure of speech meaning little or no chance
- John Chinaman, a stock caricature of a Chinese laborer seen in cartoons of the 19th century
- Asian conical hat, a simple style of conical hat originating in East and Southeast Asia
- Chinaman's Hat (Port Phillip), an octagonal structure serving as a shipping channel marker in Port Phillip, Victoria, Australia
- Chinaman of Koenigsberg, a label for Immanuel Kant used by Friedrich Nietzsche

== See also ==
- Chinese (disambiguation)
