= Ching chong =

Pejorative term used against Chinese people

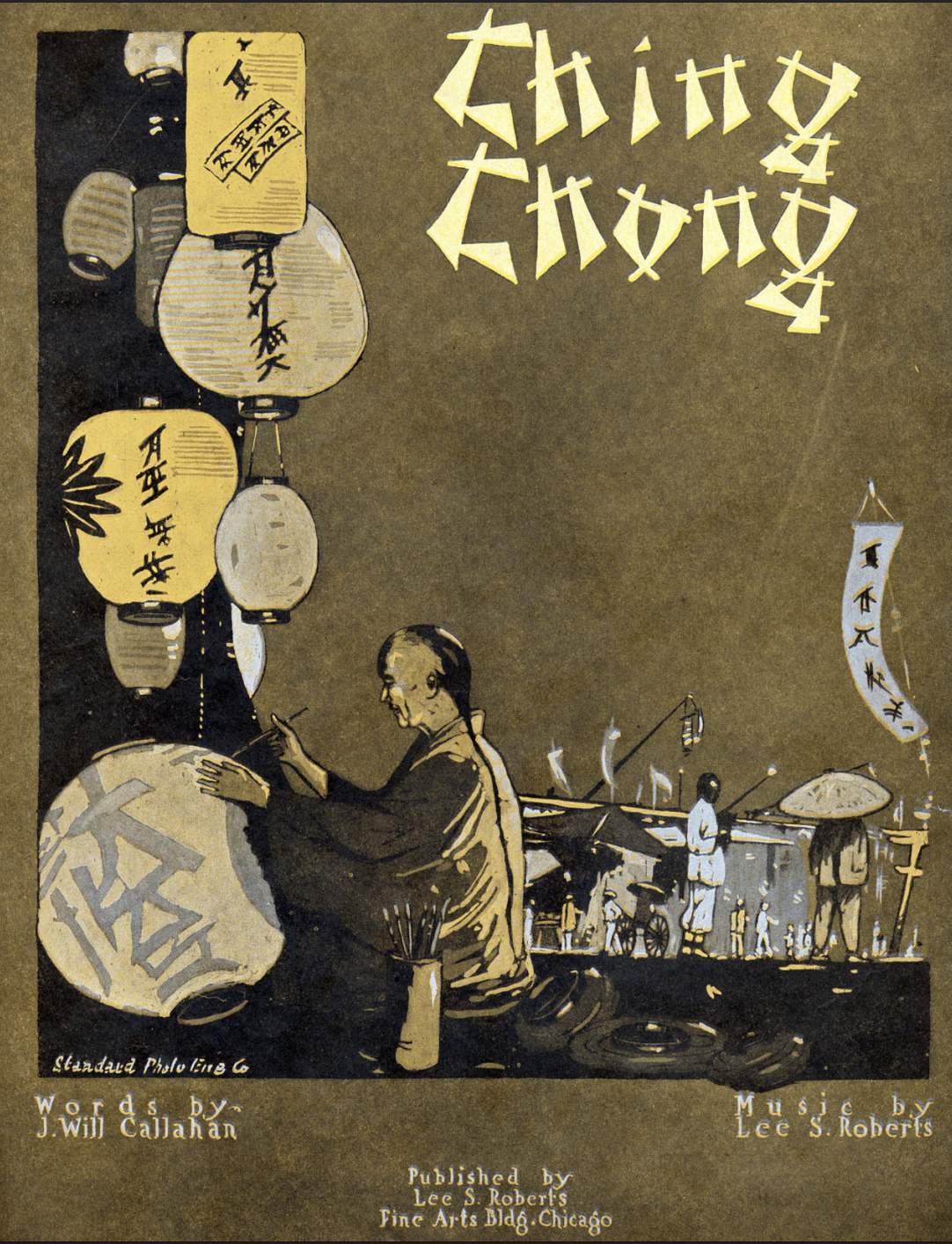
Cover of the sheet music for 1917 song "Ching Chong" by Lee S. Roberts and J. Will Callahan

Ching chong, ching chang, ching chang chong, and chung ching are offensive phrases used to mock or imitate the Chinese language, people of Chinese ancestry, or other people of East Asian descent perceived to be Chinese. The term is a derogatory imitation of Mandarin and Cantonese phonology. The phrases have sometimes accompanied assaults or physical intimidation of East Asians, as have other racial slurs or imitation of Chinese.

== Historical usage ==
While usually intended for ethnic Chinese, the remark has also been directed at other East Asians. Mary Paik Lee, a Korean immigrant who arrived with her family in San Francisco in 1906, wrote in her 1990 autobiography Quiet Odyssey that on her first day of school, girls circled and hit her, chanting:

Ching Chong, Chinaman,
Sitting on a wall.
Along came a white man,
And chopped his head off.

A variation of this rhyme is repeated by a young boy in John Steinbeck's 1945 novel Cannery Row in mockery of a Chinese man. In this version, "wall" is replaced with "rail", and the phrase "chopped his head off" is changed to "chopped off his tail":

Ching Chong, Chinaman,
Sitting on a rail.
Along came a white man,
And chopped off his tail.

In 1917, a ragtime piano song entitled "Ching Chong" was co-written by Lee S. Roberts and J. Will Callahan. Its lyrics contained the following words:

"Ching, Chong, Oh Mister Ching Chong,
You are the king of Chinatown.
Ching Chong, I love your sing-song,
When you have turned the lights all down."

== Modern incidents ==
=== 2000s ===
In December 2002, NBA star Shaquille O'Neal received media flak for saying "Tell [NBA center] Yao Ming, 'Ching chong yang, wah, ah soh'" during an interview on Fox Sports Net. O'Neal later said it was locker-room humor and he meant no offense. Yao believed that O'Neal was joking but said a lot of Asians would not see the humor. Yao joked, "Chinese is hard to learn. I had trouble with it when I was little." O'Neal added, "I mean, if I was the first one to do it, and the only one to do it, I could see what they're talking about. But if I offended anybody, I apologize."

On January 24, 2006, comedian Dave Dameshek created an audio parody of the Asian Excellence Awards for The Adam Carolla Show. The premise of the parody was using the words "ching" and "chong" to mimic the awards show. Branding the segment as demeaning and racist, several Asian American organizations threatened to ask advertisers to withdraw their support from the show if the station did not issue an apology. On February 22, 2006, Carolla read a brief apology for the segment. On April 26, 2006, Carolla had the head of the Media Action Network for Asian Americans, Guy Aoki on his show. Aoki opined that "ching chong" is equivalent to "nigger".

On December 5, 2006, comedian and co-host Rosie O'Donnell of The View used a series of ching chongs to imitate newscasters in China. O'Donnell made a comment in reference to people in China talking about Danny DeVito's drunken appearance on the show, "You know, you can imagine in China it's like, 'Ching-gong-hu-gong, ching-chang-kong. Ching-chong. Danny DeVito. Ching-chong-chong-chong-chong. Drunk. The View. Ching-chong.'" The Asian American Journalists Association said her comments were "a mockery of the Chinese language and, in effect, a perpetuation of stereotypes of Asian Americans as foreigners or second-class citizens ... and gives the impression that they are a group that is substandard to English-speaking people". Cindi Berger, O'Donnell's representative, said: "She's a comedian in addition to being a talk show co-host. I certainly hope that one day they will be able to grasp her humor." On December 14 on The View, O'Donnell said she was unaware that ching chong was an offensive way to make fun of Asian accents, and she was informed it was on par with the "N-word". She apologized to "those people who felt hurt". Jeff Yang, who tracks Asian and Asian-American trends for a market research firm, said O'Donnell should have apologized not for people's hurt feelings but "for spreading and encouraging ignorance." O'Donnell warned, "there's a good chance I'll do something like that again, probably in the next week, not on purpose. Only 'cause it's how my brain works." Time called it a "pseudo-apology". O'Donnell later wrote in her autobiography Celebrity Detox: The Fame Game that "I wish I had been a bit more pure in my public apology."

=== 2010s ===
On January 19, 2011, conservative political commentator Rush Limbaugh mocked Chinese president Hu Jintao during his visit to the White House on his radio show. "Hu Jintao—He was speaking and they weren't translating. They normally translate every couple of words. Hu Jintao was just going ching chong, ching chong cha," said Limbaugh, who imitated Hu's speech for 17 seconds. Representative Judy Chu of California said that Limbaugh's words were the same ones that Chinese Americans have heard in the past 150 years as they faced racial discrimination while "they were called racial slurs, were spat upon in the streets, derided in the halls of Congress and even brutally murdered". New York Assemblywoman Grace Meng said it was Limbaugh's prerogative to attack Hu, "but at the same time he offended 13% of New York City's population". California State Senator Leland Yee also criticized Limbaugh for his remarks: "His classless act is an insult to over 3,000 years of cultural history, and is a slap in the face to the millions of Chinese Americans who have struggled in this country and to a people who constitute one-quarter of the world's population." Yee demanded an apology from Limbaugh for what he and others view as racist and derogatory remarks. He also organized with civil rights groups—including Chinese for Affirmative Action, Japanese American Citizens League and the California National Organization for Women—to boycott companies like ProFlowers, Sleep Train and Domino's Pizza that advertised on Limbaugh's talk show. Yee received threatening messages and also received a fax from an unknown sender which made racist comments and called him a Marxist. "Rush Limbaugh will kick your Chink ass and expose you for the fool you are," part of the memo said.

In March 2011, UCLA student Alexandra Wallace uploaded a YouTube video entitled "UCLA Asians in the library", ranting about the "hordes of Asians" in UCLA who don't "use American manners". In a rant about Asians speaking loudly on a cellphone in the campus library, she mimicked one as saying, "Ohhh! Ching chong, ling long, ting tong! Ohhh!". Her rant inspired heated criticism, not only because of her use of the "ching chong" stereotype but also because of the timing: a major tsunami had just occurred in Japan, leading her to complain, "I swear they're going through their whole families, just checking on everybody from the tsunami thing." Over 40 percent of the school's 36,000 students are Asian American and Pacific Islanders. Musician Jimmy Wong uploaded the video, "Ching Chong!: Asians in the Library Song" to YouTube, in response. The video received national coverage. The Sacramento Bee wrote, "The students [she] mocked can inspire resentment, jealousy and fear—the kindling of ethnic slurs—because their success is about achievement and a pathway to status." Additional responses included a line of T-shirts featuring the "Ching-chong" slur, with all proceeds going to Red Cross relief for the tsunami. UCLA deemed the video offensive and called it "repugnant". The student later wrote to The Daily Bruin, issuing an apology to "the entire UCLA campus". The New York Times published an editorial criticizing the video, but supporting her First Amendment right to free speech. Several days later, UCLA announced it would not discipline the student, but she withdrew from the university. AsianWeek wrote that "any negatives [the student] experienced are just a fraction of what Asian Americans have experienced since coming to America".

A Colbert Report tweet, in March 2014, brought the slur back into the limelight. The program was lampooning the controversy surrounding the name of the Washington Redskins football team. The team's owner, Daniel Snyder, had announced that he was dedicating a charity for Native Americans called "Washington Redskins Original Americans Foundation". In the March 26, 2014 episode of the Report, Colbert satirized a charity to Native Americans using the offensive word "Redskins" in its name, and stated that he would be starting his own similar charity called "Ching-Chong Ding-Dong Foundation for Sensitivity to Orientals or Whatever", adding "I owe all this sensitivity to Redskins owner Dan Snyder. So Asians, send your thank-you letters to him, not me." The following day, a Twitter account for the program run by Comedy Central tweeted, "I am willing to show #Asian community I care by introducing the Ching-Chong Ding-Dong Foundation for Sensitivity to Orientals or Whatever" but did not link to the episode or provide context for the statement. This quickly led to people creating a #CancelColbert hashtag, which lasted until the following Monday's episode (March 31, 2014) when Colbert described the sequence of events, scolded Comedy Central for the poorly contextualized tweet, and criticized the offense-takers' haste in their CancelColbert campaign, also noting that Dan Snyder's charity named after Redskins was ironically not being protested.

During the 2014 League of Legends World Championship group stage in Taiwan, Team SoloMid jungler Svenskeren registered an account by the name TaipeiChingChong on the Garena servers and was subsequently fined and suspended by Riot Games. The incident was also criticized by the Taiwanese version of the newspaper Apple Daily.

In August 2018, voters reported that Michigan state representative Bettie Cook Scott urged her supporters, "don't vote for the ching-chong" in the primary election, referring to her opponent, Stephanie Chang. She later issued an apology through a representative. She would lose the election and de facto defaulted her seat after the apology until Chang's inauguration to a Michigan House office charged with representing the district's affairs in the interim period in her place.

In November 2018, Filipino Dota 2 player Carlo "Kuku" Palad was banned from attending the Chongqing Major after typing "ching chong" during a live match against Chinese players. He eventually apologized, but did not get his ban lifted. This followed an earlier event when another Filipino player Andrei "Skemberlu" Ong used the same term during a match with a Chinese team a few weeks earlier.

In December 2018, American rapper Lil Pump was criticized after using the term in a teaser for his then-upcoming single "Butterfly Doors", which also contained the lyric "They call me Yao Ming 'cuz my eyes real low" with him slanting his eyes. He later was chided by several Asian and Asian-American rappers such as China Mac and Awkwafina. Lil Pump subsequently released an apology and edited out the lyrics from the official music video.

=== 2020s ===
In November 2022, German former professional footballer Jimmy Hartwig was criticized after using the term in his commentary about the Japan national football team on WELT-TV for the 2022 FIFA World Cup. The WELT management company removed the video from YouTube and Hartwig posted an apology on his Instagram.

In February 2025, Queenstown, New Zealand hamburger bar Fergburger apologised for identifying a customer on a shop receipt with stereotypical label ching chang. The employee was later fired.

In July 2025, the English singer Liam Gallagher of Oasis used the term "ching chong" in an X post days before the kickoff of the Oasis Live '25 Tour. This led to much backlash, especially from Asian accounts. He has since deleted the post and apologised.

== See also ==
- Asian riff
- List of ethnic slurs
- Chink
- Anti-Chinese sentiment
- Zhing-zhong
- Pseudo-Chinese
