= Chinaman =

Offensive term for Chinese people

Chinaman is a term for a person of Chinese descent, nationality, or birth. It is viewed by some American lobby groups as an offensive term referring to a Chinese man or person, or widely a person native to geographical East Asia or of perceived East Asian ethnicity. The term is noted as having non-pejorative meanings by modern dictionaries. (Note: The term was not yet been noted as being with negative connotations in the 1913-version Webster Dictionary.) Its derogatory connotations evolved from its use in pejorative contexts regarding Chinese people and other East Asians, as well as its resemblance to stereotypical characterizations of Chinese accents in English-speaking associated with discrimination. The usage of the term Chinaman is strongly discouraged by Asian American organizations.

== Historic usage ==
=== Use in Australia ===
Historically, words such as Chinaman, chink and yellow have been used in Australia to refer to Chinese Australians during the Australian gold rushes and when the White Australia policy was in force.

=== Use in the United States ===
The term Chinaman has been historically used in a variety of ways, including legal documents, literary works, geographic names, and in speech. Census records in 19th-century North America recorded Chinese men by names such as "John Chinaman", "Jake Chinaman" or simply as "Chinaman". Chinese American historian Emma Woo Louie commented that such names in census schedules were used when census takers could not obtain any information and that they "should not be considered to be racist in intent". One census taker in El Dorado County wrote, "I found about 80 Chinese men in Spanish Canion who refused to give me their names or other information." Louie equated "John Chinaman" to "John Doe" in its usage to refer to a person whose name is not known, and added that other ethnic groups were also identified by generic terms as well, such as Spaniard and Kanaka, which refers to a Hawaiian.

In a notable 1853 letter to Governor of California John Bigler which challenges his proposed immigration policy toward the Chinese, restaurant owner Norman Asing, at the time a leader in San Francisco's Chinese community, refers to himself as a "Chinaman". Addressing the governor, he writes, "Sir: I am a Chinaman, a republican, and a lover of free institutions." Chinaman was also often used in complimentary contexts, such as "after a very famous Chinaman in old Cassiar Rush days, (who was) known & loved by whites and natives".

As the Chinese in the American West began to encounter discrimination and hostile criticism of their culture and mannerisms, the term would begin to take on negative connotations. The slogan of the Workingman's Party was "The Chinese Must Go!", coined in the 1870s before Chinaman acquired a derogatory association. The term Chinaman's chance evolved as the Chinese began to take on dangerous jobs building the railroads or ventured to exploit mine claims abandoned by others, and later found themselves victims of injustice as accused murderers (of Chinese) would be acquitted if the only testimony against them was from other Chinese. Legal documents such as the Geary Act of 1892, which barred the entry of Chinese people to the United States, referred to Chinese people both as "Chinese persons" or "Chinamen".

=== Use for Japanese people ===
The term has also been used to refer to Japanese men, despite the fact that they are not Chinese. The Japanese admiral Tōgō Heihachirō, during his training in England in the 1870s, was called "Johnny Chinaman" by his British comrades. Civil rights pioneer Takuji Yamashita took a case to the United States Supreme Court in 1922 on the issue of the possibility of allowing Japanese immigrants to own land in the state of Washington. Washington's attorney general, in his argument, stated that Japanese people could not fit into American society because assimilation was not possible for "the Negro, the Indian and the Chinaman".

=== Use for Korean people ===
Mary Paik Lee, a Korean immigrant who arrived with her family in San Francisco in 1906, writes in her 1990 autobiography Quiet Odyssey that on her first day of school, girls circled and hit her, chanting:

Ching Chong, Chinaman,
Sitting on a wall.
Along came a white man,
And chopped his head off.

A variation of this rhyme is repeated by a young boy in John Steinbeck's 1945 novel Cannery Row in mockery of a Chinese man. In this version, "wall" is instead "rail", and the phrase "chopped his head off" is instead "chopped off his tail" (queue hairstyle):

Ching Chong, Chinaman,
Sitting on a rail.
Along came a white man,
And chopped off his tail.

=== Literary use ===
Literary and musical works have used the term as well. In "Disgraceful Persecution of a Boy", an 1870 essay written by Mark Twain, a sympathetic and often flattering account about the circumstances of Chinese people in 19th-century United States society, the term is used throughout the body of the essay to refer to Chinese people. Over a hundred years later, the term would again be used during the Civil Rights era in the context of racial injustice in literary works. The term was used in the title of Chinese American writer Frank Chin's first play, The Chickencoop Chinaman, written in 1972, and also in the translated English title of Bo Yang's work of political and cultural criticism The Ugly Chinaman and the Crisis of Chinese Culture.

During the 1890s detective fiction often portrayed Chinese characters as stereotypically conniving, tending to use the term "Chinaman" to refer to them. This occurred to such a great extent that it prompted writers of the 1920s and 1930s (during Britain's Golden Age of Detective Fiction) to eschew stereotypical characterizations, either by removing them from their stories entirely (as suggested by Ronald Knox in his "Ten Commandments" of Detective Fiction) or by recasting them in non-stereotypical roles. This "Rule of Rule Subversion" became an important part of Golden Age detective fiction, challenging readers to think more critically about characters using only information given in the story.

In musical works, the term appears in Mort Shuman's 1967 translation of the Jacques Brel song "Jacky": "Locked up inside my opium den / Surrounded by some Chinamen." (The phrase used in Brel's original French lyric was vieux Chinois, meaning "old Chinese".) The term was also used in the hit 1974 song Kung Fu Fighting, by Carl Douglas; the song's first verse begins "They were funky Chinamen from funky Chinatown."

== Modern usage ==
The term Chinaman is described as being offensive in most modern dictionaries and studies of usage. The New Fowler's Modern English Usage considers Chinaman to have a "derogatory edge", The Cambridge Guide to English Usage describes it as having "derogatory overtones", and Philip Herbst's reference work The Color of Words notes that it may be "taken as patronizing". This distinguishes it from similar ethnic names such as Englishman and Irishman, which are not used pejoratively. This also differs in vernacular as terms such as Englandman, Irelandman, and Chineseman (compounded) are not commonly used.

In its original sense, Chinaman is now almost entirely absent from British English, with the word shifting from its former descriptive use to a more derogatory usage some time before 1965. However, chinaman (not capitalized) remained in use in an alternative sense to describe a left-arm unorthodox spin bowler in cricket, although the use of the term is declining due to the racial overtones associated with it. Most British dictionaries see the term Chinaman as old-fashioned, and this view is backed up by data from the British National Corpus. According to Merriam-Webster's Dictionary of English Usage, in American English Chinaman is most often used in a "knowing" way, either satirically or to evoke the word's historical connotations. It acknowledges, however, that there is still some usage that is completely innocent. In addition, Herbst notes in The Color of Words that despite Chinaman's negative connotations, its use is not usually intended as malicious.

== In popular culture ==
On April 9, 1998, television sitcom show Seinfeld aired an episode in which a character referred to opium as "the Chinaman's nightcap". The episode prompted many Asian American viewers, including author Maxine Hong Kingston, to send letters of protest. In her letter, Kingston wrote that the term is "equivalent to niggers for blacks and kikes for Jews". Media watchdog Media Action Network for Asian Americans (MANAA) called on NBC, broadcasting network for the show, to issue a public apology. NBC did not issue an apology, but it removed the offending term from the episode in the episode's rerun in May 1998. NBC's executive vice president for broadcast standards and content policy sent MANAA a letter stating that the network never intended to offend. MANAA was pleased with the studio's response despite the lack of an apology, and Kingston, while disappointed there was no apology, was pleased that the term was removed from the episode.

In 2001, the Chicago Sun-Times was chastised by William Yashino, Midwest director of the Japanese American Citizens League, for using the term Chinaman in two of its columns. Yashino wrote, in a letter to the editor on May 16, 2001, that the term is derogatory and demeaning to Chinese Americans and Asian Americans, and that it marginalizes these communities and inflames public sentiment.

In March 2007, media mogul Ted Turner used the term in a public speech before the Bay Area Council of San Francisco, California. Community leaders and officials objected to his use of the term, and immediately called for an apology. In a statement released by his spokesman on March 13, 2007, Turner apologized for having used the term, stating that he was unaware that the term was derogatory. Vincent Pan, director of the organization Chinese for Affirmative Action, said it was "a bit suspect" for someone involved in domestic and world politics like Turner to be unaware that the term is derogatory. Yvonne Lee, a former commissioner of the U.S. Civil Rights Commission, said the apology was the first step, but wanted Turner to agree to further "dialogue between different communities".

On April 11, 2008, golf announcer Bobby Clampett apologized for referring to golfer Liang Wen-Chong as "the Chinaman" during the Masters golf tournament at Augusta National Golf Club. Clampett, working the Internet broadcast of Amen Corner, made the comment after Liang missed the cut. According to the St. Louis Post-Dispatch, Clampett was taken off the broadcast after the comment.

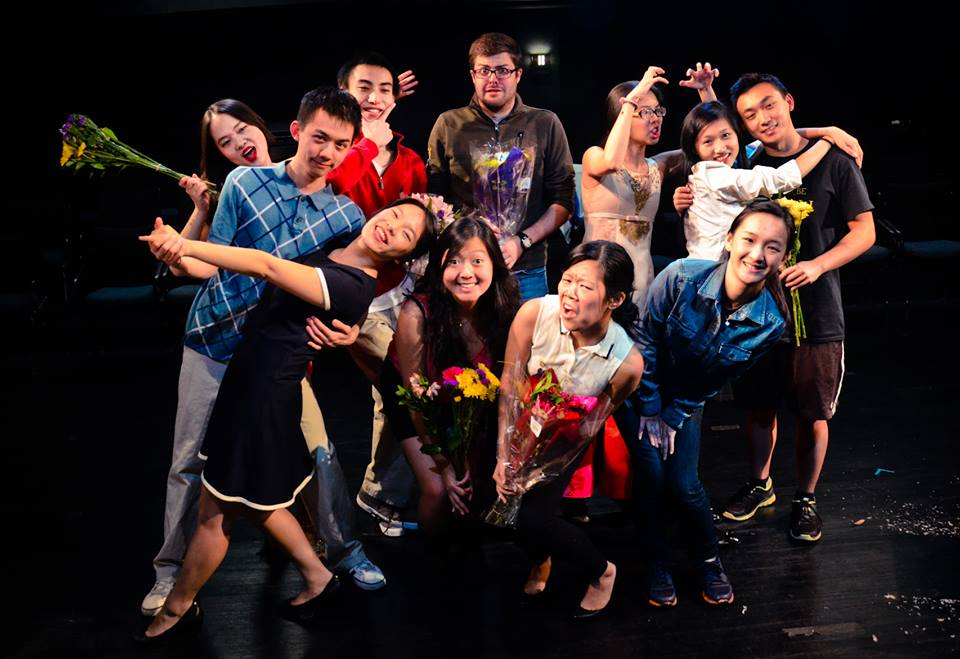
Ching Chong Chinaman production photo

In 2010, the Pan Asian Repertory Theatre released a statement explaining their decision to produce a play by Lauren Yee titled Ching Chong Chinaman, a term which has at times been used in doggerel verse with racist overtones. Artistic Producing Director Tisa Chang explained that "Ching Chong Chinaman takes its controversial title from the late 19th century pejorative jingle and uses irony and satire to reverse prejudicial attitudes towards Asians and other outsiders."

In 2014, New York Mets pitching coach Dan Warthen referred to Daisuke Matsuzaka's Japanese American interpreter as a "Chinaman". He issued an apology alongside the Mets organization.

Children's book author and illustrator Dr. Seuss used the word "Chinaman" along with a racial caricature of a bright-yellow man with a queue and chopsticks in his 1937 book And to Think That I Saw It on Mulberry Street. It was initially changed to "Chinese man" and his queue and bright skin color was removed, but the controversy ensued. In March 2021, Dr. Seuss's estate announced that Mulberry Street was one of six Dr. Seuss books that would no longer be published due to insensitive portrayals. Multiple examples of other cartoons widely considered to contain anti-Asian racism by Dr. Seuss can be found in his banned books and political cartoons.

== Place names ==
=== Australia ===
There are many places in Australia named "Chinaman's Creek". These are located in New South Wales, Queensland, South Australia, Victoria, and Western Australia. For example, due to the Brisbane suburb of Albany Creek being formerly known as "Chinaman's Creek", the local state school (Albany Creek State School, renamed in 1887) went through two different names: Chinaman's Creek State School (from January 25, 1875) and Chinaman's Creek Provisional School (from 1883), plus a local road (Albany Creek Road) was formerly named "Chinaman's Creek Road".

There are also three beaches named "Chinaman's Beach", one in Evans Head, New South Wales, another in Mosman, New South Wales (a suburb of Sydney) and another in Jervis Bay, Jervis Bay Territory.

There is an island in the Murray River near Yarrawonga, Victoria named "Chinaman's Island", as well as an island named "Chinaman Island" in Western Port, Victoria.

There is a lagoon in Miles, Queensland named "Chinaman's Lagoon".

There is a campsite in the Blue Mountains of New South Wales known as "Chinaman's Gully".

The name "Chinaman's Hill" is used by two hills in New South Wales, one in East Kurrajong, Sydney and the other located in the Great Dividing Range, west of Byron Bay. The former is named after the Chinese Australians who settled the area in the 20th century.

Chinaman's Hat is a structure in Port Phillip Bay, Victoria. This is also the name of a rock formation on Mount Wilson in New South Wales.

Chinamans Hat Island is an island off the south coast of the Yorke Peninsula of South Australia.

Chinaman Wells is a locality in South Australia, also off the Yorke Peninsula.

The town of Timor in central Victoria has gone through several different names over its history, one of them being "Chinaman's Flat".

There are two bays in Tasmania whose names contain the term, Chinaman Bay and Little Chinaman Bay.

There are two Australian places (one in New South Wales and one in Victoria) named "Chinaman's Knob".

=== Canada ===
On July 7, 1998, Canada's province of Alberta changed the name of a peak in the Rocky Mountains from "Chinaman's Peak" to "Ha Ling Peak" due to pressure from the province's large Chinese community. The new name was chosen in honour of the railway labourer who scaled the peak's 2,408-metre (7,900 ft)-high summit in 1896 to win a $50 bet to commemorate all his fellow Chinese railway labourers. Ha Ling himself had named it "Chinaman's Peak" on behalf of all his fellow Chinese railway workers.

=== Ireland ===
Historically, there was a pub in Dublin known as "The Old Chinaman".

=== New Zealand ===
Chinaman Bay is a bay on Tiritiri Matangi Island, a small island off the coast of Auckland.

Chinaman's Bluff is a crag in Queenstown known for hiking.

=== United States ===
The basalt islet of Mokoliʻi in Hawaii is commonly known as "Chinaman's Hat", although this term is discouraged by many. A proposal to request that the Hawaii Tourism Authority officially disfavour the name Mokoliʻi over Chinaman's Hat failed.

There are two places in the continental United States named "Chinaman's Hat", located in Oregon and Texas.

A ranch in Tecopa, California was once named "China Man's Ranch". As of 2024, the ranch operates as a date farm, which was opened to the public as "China Ranch" in 1996.

A lake in northern Minnesota is called "Chinaman's Lake".

A campsite in Helena, Montana named "Chinamen's Gulch".

== See also ==
- John Chinaman
- Chinaman's chance
- Ching chong
- Chink
- Gweilo
- List of ethnic slurs
- Shina (word)
- Chinaman (politics)
