= The Passing Show of 1918 =

1918 Broadway revue

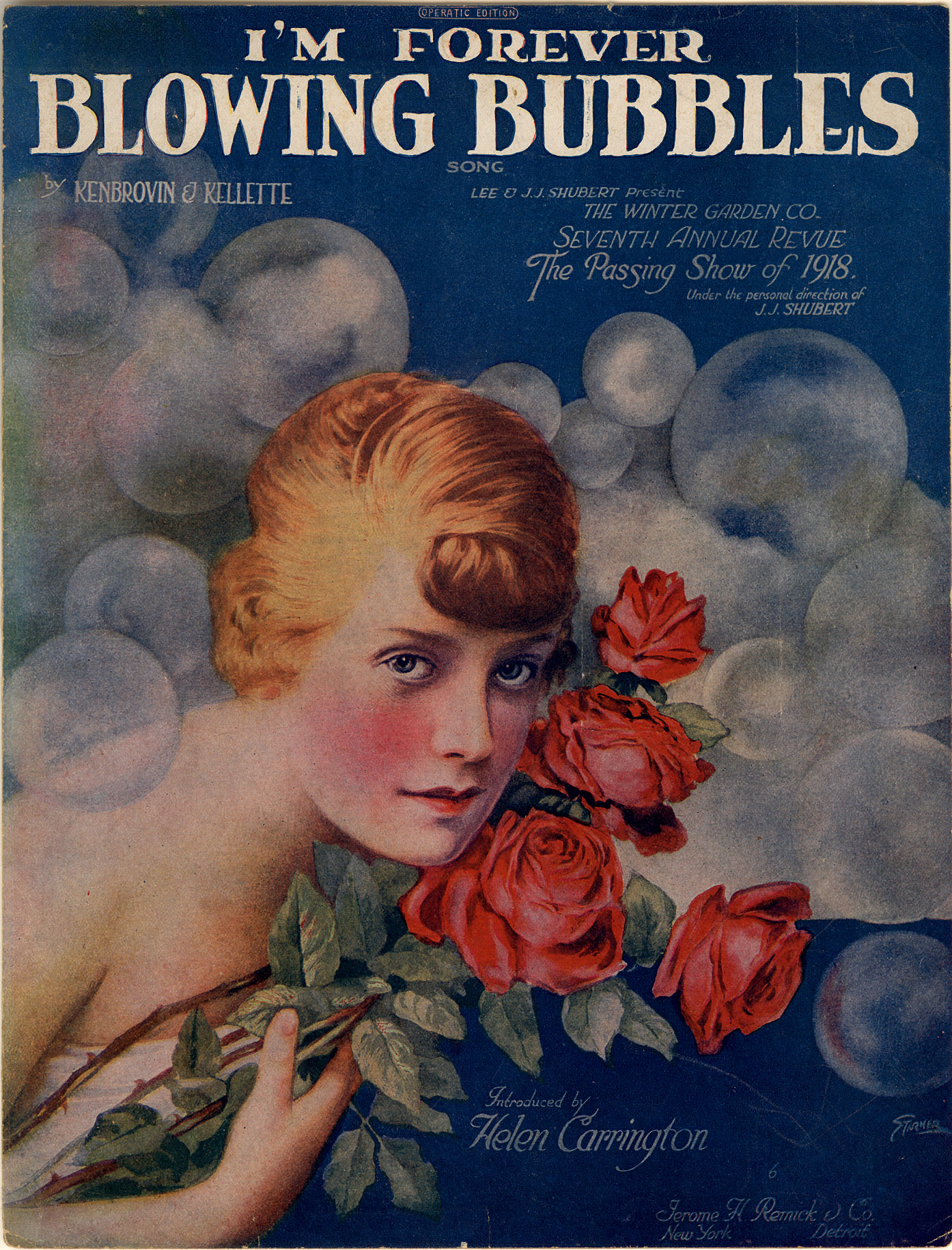
Sheet music from the revue's hit song

The Passing Show of 1918 is a Broadway musical revue featuring music of Sigmund Romberg and Jean Schwartz (and other songwriters), with book and lyrics by Harold Atteridge. The show introduced the hit songs "I'm Forever Blowing Bubbles" and "Smiles".

Staged by J. C. Huffman and choreographed by Jack Mason, the show debuted at the Winter Garden Theater on July 25, 1918. Playing for 142 performances, it closed on November 9 of the same year. The show was produced by Lee and Jacob J. Shubert. The production featured an early appearance of Fred Astaire (with his sister Adele). The New York Times called it "rattling good entertainment" and praised the "vaudeville team" of Fred and Adele Astaire, as well as the brothers Willie and Eugene Howard.

== Background ==
The original The Passing Show was presented in 1894 by George Lederer at the Casino Theatre. It featured spoofs of theatrical productions of the past season. It was one of the first musical revues on Broadway and led the fashion for such productions. The Casino Theatre produced a revue each summer thereafter for several seasons.

In 1912, Lee and Jacob J. Shubert began an annual series of twelve elaborate Broadway revues at the Winter Garden Theatre, using the name The Passing Show of 19XX, designed to compete with the popular Ziegfeld Follies. They featured libretti by Atteridge and music usually by Romberg, George Gershwin or Herman Finck. Willie and Eugene Howard starred in many editions of the series and in the many editions of the George White's Scandals. Other stars included Charlotte Greenwood, Marilyn Miller, Ed Wynn, De Wolf Hopper, Charles Winninger, Fred Astaire and his sister Adele, Marie Dressler, Fred Allen, George Hassell, and Violet Englefield. Most of the Shubert shows, including the 1918 show, were staged by J. C. Huffman.

== Synopsis ==
The revue was structured into thirteen scenes, tied together by parodies of the previous season's shows including The Squab Farm.

== Musical numbers ==
Act 1

- I (Really) Can't Make My Feet Behave
- War Stamps (Won't You Buy a War Stamp?) (Music By Ray Perkins)
- My Baby Talking Girl (My Baby-Talk Lady)
- Go West, Young Girl (Music by Russell Tarbox)
- Trombone Jazz
- My Vampire Girl
- Squab Farm
- The Shimmy Sisters
- On the Level, You're a Devil, But I'll Soon Make An Angel Out of You (Lyrics by Joe Young)
- (That Soothing) Serenade (Music and lyrics by Harry DeCosta)
- Bring on the Girls

Act 2

- Twit, Twit, Twit
- My Holiday Girls (Music by Augustus Barratt)
- Quick Service
- (The) Galli Curci Rag
- Smiles (Lyrics by J. Will Callahan; music by Lee S. Roberts)
- I'm Forever Blowing Bubbles (Music by John Kellette; lyrics by Jaan Kenbrovin)
- My Duchess of the Long Ago
- Boots
- Dress, Dress, Dress

== See also ==
- The Passing Show of 1916
