= My Best Girl (disambiguation) =

My Best Girl is a 1927 film with Mary Pickford and Buddy Rogers.

My Best Girl may also refer to:

- My Best Girl (musical), a 1912 Broadway musical co-composed by W. Augustus Barratt
- My Best Girl (1915 film), a film with Lois Meredith
- My Best Girl (1925 film), a film with Larry Semon
