= Zhing-zhong =

Zimbabwean slang for low quality products

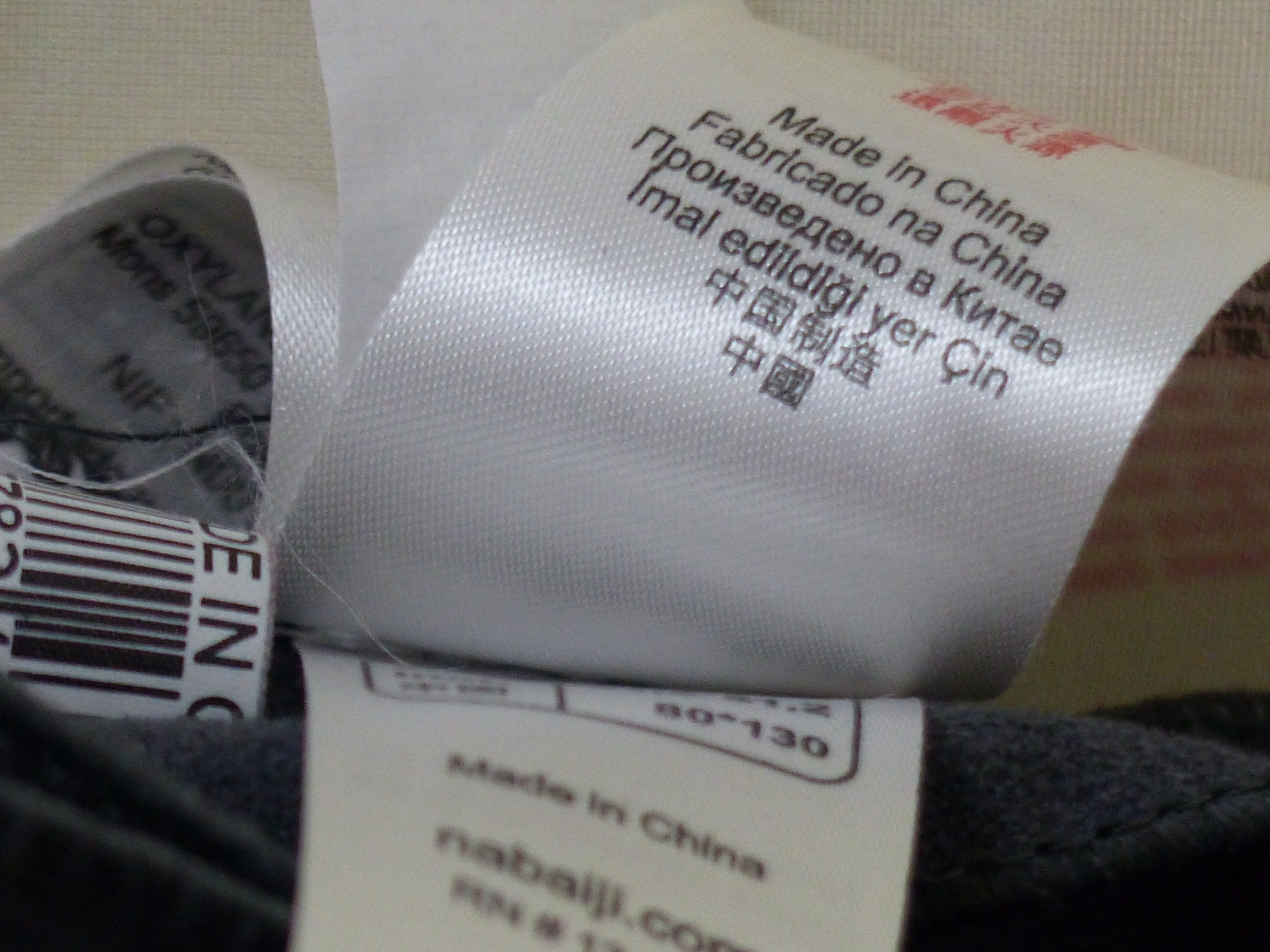
A tag that reads "Made in China"

Zhing-zhong, or jing zhong, is a Zimbabwean slang term for inexpensive Chinese products of poor quality. In some contexts, it may refer only to cheaply-made fake products, not necessarily from China. In South Africa, similar goods are called fong kong. Shops run by Chinese people in Africa selling Chinese clothes and shoes are also sometimes called "Zhing-zhong" shops.

Zhing-zhong is sometimes used as a pejorative towards people of Chinese descent or other people of East Asian descent perceived to be Chinese, that developed in response to an influx of Chinese immigrants during an economic downturn in the 2000s.

== Etymology ==
The term is potentially derived from zhèngzōng (正宗; 'authentic').

== History ==
Chinese immigrants began to first arrive in large numbers to Zimbabwe in the 1980s. They make up a large part of the economy, but social integration has been slow, resulting in negative stereotyping by the local Zimbabweans. Low-priced Chinese imports like toys, makeup, and clothing are ridiculed for their low-quality but still purchased for their affordability.

== Usage ==
In 2004, Fred Mpofu, secretary general of the union, addressed Asian immigrants to Zimbabwe: “don’t supply us with what we can produce here, supply us with that which we can’t produce. It’s like we’re exporting our jobs to Asia.”

In 2005, several arrests were allegedly made for using the term under the Miscellaneous Offences Act. In 2009, members from the Zimbabwe Congress of Trade Unions held posters that read "No to Zhing Zhong" signs to protest the economic conditions.

Following the 2017 coup, the term remains in use as the products have had staying power, but sentiments have improved since Zimbabwe joined the Belt and Road Initiative.

== See also ==
- China–Zimbabwe relations
- Chinese people in Zimbabwe
- Ching chong
- Shanzhai
