= Gasoline (1913 song) =

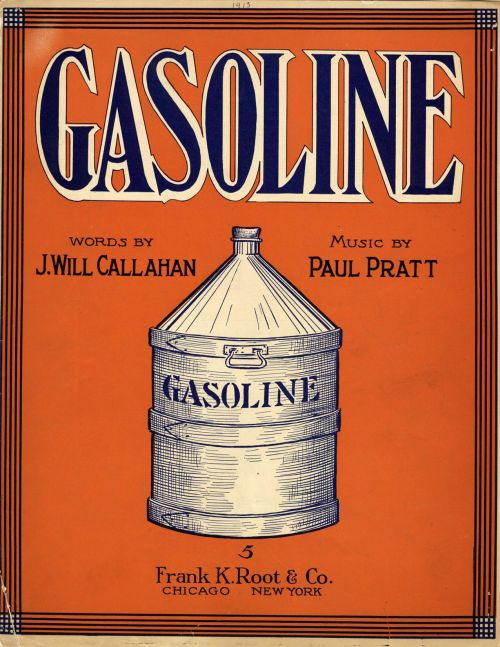
- Cover of "Gasoline", 1913.

Song
- Language: English
- Published: 1913
- Songwriter(s): Composer: Paul Pratt; Lyricist: J. Will Callahan

"Gasoline" is a popular song written in 1913 in deference to the modern necessity for the commodity, gasoline. Lyrics were written by J. Will Callahan (1874–1946) and the music composed by Indiana musician Paul Pratt (1890–1948). The song asks a series of questions—What is it keep this world of ours a-going? What makes us happy night and day? What is the precious thing for which we're blowing each blessed dollar of our weekly pay? etc.—which it answers in the chorus:

Gasoline! Gasoline!
Ev'rywhere you go you smell it,
Ev'ry motor seems to yell it.
Gasoline! Gasoline!
That's the cry that echoes thro your dreams.
Gasoline! Gasoline!
In this land of milk and honey
'Tisn't love—isn't money
Rules the world, now ain't it funny?
Gasoline! Gasoline!

Written in 2/4 time, the song is set to the tempo of Moderato marcia.

"Gasoline" is one of the songs the National Museum of American History includes in its collection, America on the Move.

== Bibliography ==
- Callahan; J. Will; Pratt, Paul. "Gasoline" (sheet music). Chicago: Frank K. Root & Co. (1913)
- Smithsonian Institution. "Gasoline America on the Move. Washington D.C.: National Museum of American History.
