= Sucheng Chan =

Professor of Asian American studies

Sucheng Chan (simplified Chinese: 陈素真; traditional Chinese: 陳素真; pinyin: Chén Sùzhēn; born 1941) is a Chinese-American author, historian, scholar, and professor. She established the first full-fledged autonomous Department of Asian American Studies at a major U.S. research university and was the first Asian American woman in the University of California system to hold the title of provost.

== Early life and education ==
Chan was born in Shanghai, China in 1941. Her family moved to Hong Kong in 1949, to Malaysia in 1950, and to the US in 1957. She received a bachelor's degree at Swarthmore College (Economics, 1963), a master's degree at the University of Hawaiʻi (Asian Studies, 1965), and a Ph.D. at University of California, Berkeley (Political Science, 1973).

== Career ==
Chan taught at four University of California campuses: Berkeley, Santa Cruz, Santa Barbara, and San Diego (the last as a visiting professor). Now retired from the University of California, Santa Barbara because of the effects of post-polio syndrome, she donated much of her personal papers to the Immigration History Research Center Archives, part of the University of Minnesota Libraries, and has made multiple donations of books from her large personal library to the University of California, Merced. Her personal library includes books in Asian American Studies, Latino/a Studies, African American Studies, global studies, global migrations, sociological theories, U.S. immigration history and California history. She was a Guggenheim Fellowship laureate in 1988.

== Personal life ==
Chan married Mark Juergensmeyer, a fellow graduate student at UC Berkeley, who became a widely published scholar in the fields of religion and politics, global studies, and terrorism.

== Selected works ==
- 1986, "This Bittersweet Soil: The Chinese in California Agriculture, 1860-1910″
- 1989, "Social and Gender Boundaries in the United States"
- 1990, "Income and Status Differences Between White and Minority Americans: A Persistent Inequality"
- 1990, Quiet Odyssey: A Pioneer Korean Woman in America by Mary Paik Lee (editor)
- 1991, "Asian Americans: An Interpretive History"
- 1991, "Entry Denied: Exclusion and the Chinese Community in America, 1882-1943″
- 1993, "Peoples of Color in the American West" (co-edited with Douglas Daniels, Mario Barrera, and Terry P. Wilson)
- 1994, "Hmong Means Free: Life in Laos and America"
- 1996, "Major Problems in California History" (co-edited with Spencer Olin)
- 1998, "Claiming America: Constructing Chinese American Identities during the Exclusion Era" (co-edited with K. Scott Wong)
- 2003, "Not Just Victims: Conversations with Cambodian Community Leaders in the United States"
- 2003, "Remapping Asian American History"
- 2004, "Survivors: Cambodian Refugees in the United States"
- 2005, "Chinese American Transnationalism: The Flow of People, Resources. and Ideas between China and America during the Exclusion Era"
- 2005, "In Defense of Asian American Studies: The Politics of Teaching and Program Building"
- 2006, "The Vietnamese American 1.5 Generation: Stories of War, Revolution, Flight, and New Beginnings"
- 2008, "Chinese Americans and the Politics of Race and Culture" (co-editor with Madeline Hsu)

== Awards ==
- 1973, National Endowment for the Humanities fellowship for the study of U.S. Minorities
- 1978, Distinguished Teaching Award, University of California at Berkeley
- 1984, Best article award, Pacific Historical Review
- 1986, Theodore Saloutos Memorial Book Award in Agricultural History
- 1987, Pacific Coast Branch Book Award, American Historical Association
- 1988, Outstanding Book Award, Association for Asian American Studies
- 1988, John Simon Guggenheim fellowship
- 1990, Outstanding Book Award, Association for Asian American Studies
- 1992, J.S. Holliday award for contributions to California History, California Historical Society
- 1992, Outstanding Book Award, Gustavus Myers Center for the Study of Civil Rights
- 1994, Margaret T. Getman Service to Students Award, University of California at Santa Barbara
- 1997, Lifetime Achievement Award, Association for Asian American Studies
- 1998, Asian American Faculty and Staff Association's Distinguished Lecturer Award, University of California at Santa Barbara
- 1998, Distinguished Teaching Award, University of California at Santa Barbara
- 2001, History and Social Science Book Award, Association for Asian American Studies
- 2005, Outstanding Academic Title Award, Choice Magazine
- 2006, History Book Award, Association for Asian American Studies

== See also ==
- List of Guggenheim Fellowships awarded in 1988

== Bibliography ==
- Zhao, Xiaojian; Park, Edward J. W. (26 November 2013). Asian Americans: An Encyclopedia of Social, Cultural, Economic, and Political History. ABC-CLIO. ISBN 978-1-59884-240-1.
