= Chinaman's chance =

Figure of speech meaning little or no chance

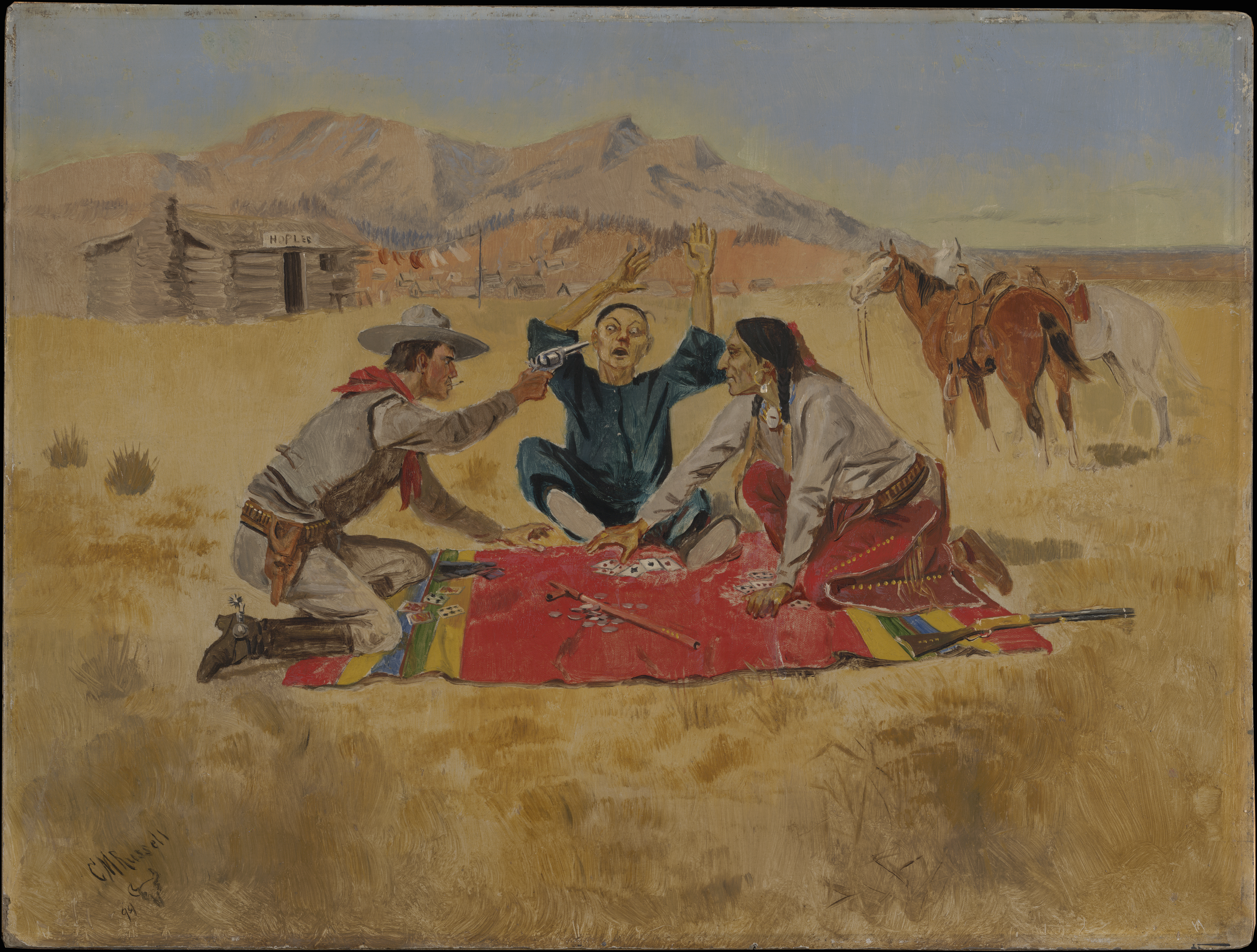
- Not a Chinaman's Chance (1894), Charles Marion Russell
- Meaning: nonexistent or highly unlikely probability of success

Chinaman's chance is an American idiom which means that a person has little or no chance at success, synonymous with similar idioms of improbability such as a snowball's chance in hell or when pigs fly. While the origin of the phrase is unclear, the expression is controversial due to its use of the term "Chinaman".

== Meaning ==
The idiom is defined as meaning "no chance at all" in The Columbia Guide to Standard American English. Sometimes an extended form not a Chinaman's chance is used.

== Potential origins ==
The origin of the phrase is not well documented. However, it is often speculated to be related to the treatment or experiences of Chinese immigrants to America in the 1800s, with many specific incidents or situations potentially serving as an origin. An alternative theory speculates it might be related to "chinaman", a seller of chinaware, with chinaman's chance referring to the fragility of fine porcelain.

=== Chinese immigration ===
When Federal officers mete out such treatment to a man previously established to be an American citizen, we can well understand the bitter irony of the current phrase "A Chinaman's chance."

— Justices Denman, Stephens, and Healy, Chun Kock Quon v. Proctor (1937)

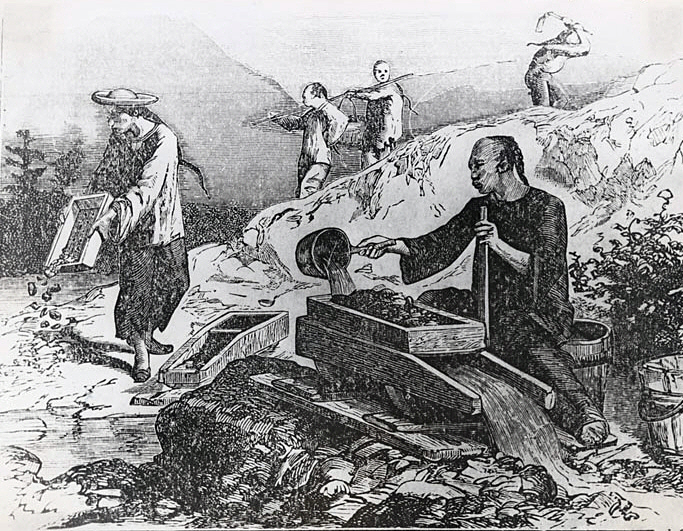
Chinese gold miners using rocker boxes

One early potential origin for the phrase is from the California gold rush of 1849. The travel time for news of the gold rush to reach China was quite long, and by the time Chinese immigrants arrived to prospect, many of the rich mines were already claimed. These Chinese immigrants who missed out had to work with only those lands which had already been exploited or which were rejected by others, meaning these late-arriving immigrants had a slim chance of success. The historical record, however, indicates that many Chinese combined efforts with each other and did very well in the goldfields, introducing mining techniques then unknown to non-Chinese. Alternatively, in 1920 the phrase was explained to describe the low probability for the Chinese in America to make a fortune at gold mining. Although there were Chinese in the gold mining camps soon after the news broke, "they were extremely unpopular [and] the slightest excuse was sufficient to warrant their being beaten or chased away; consequently they had no chance to get a real foothold" to establish mining rights.

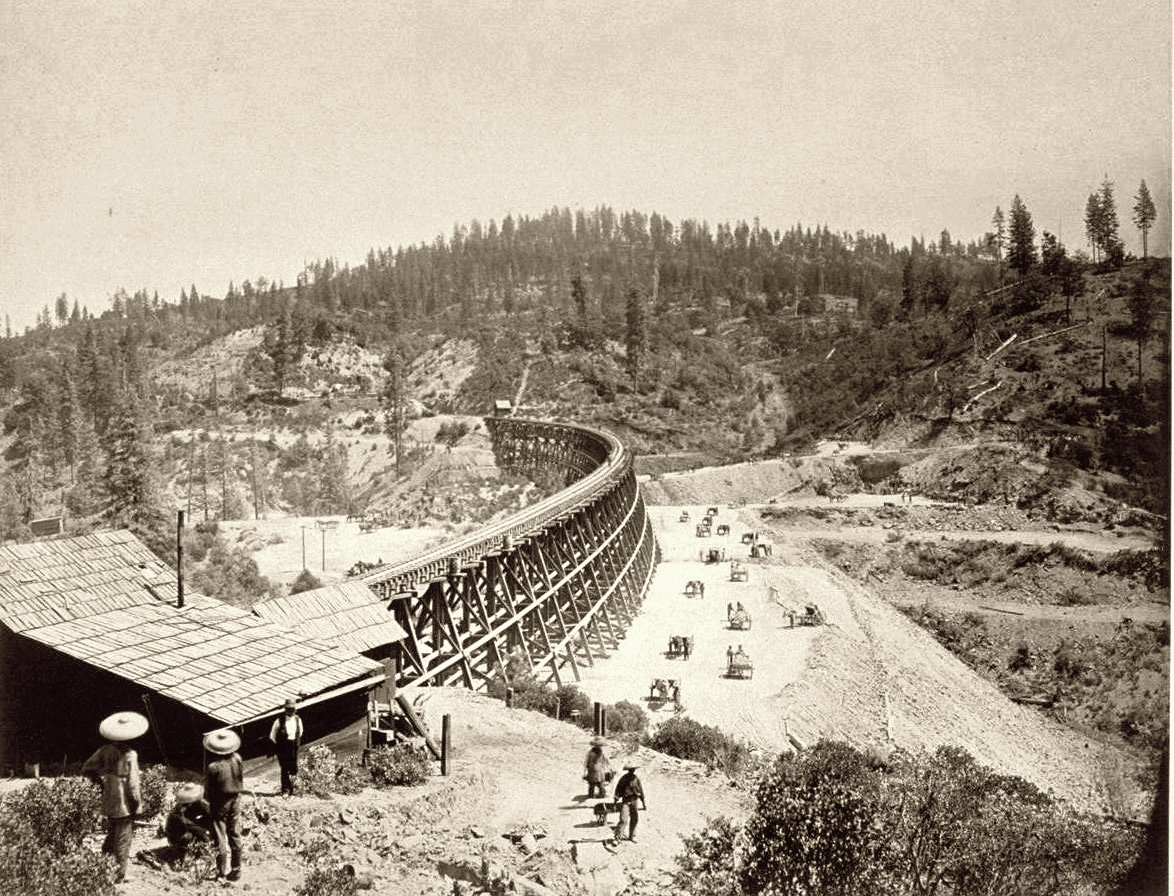
Chinese laborers replacing the trestle at Secret Town with an earthen embankment (1877)

Another potential origin of the phrase Chinaman's chance traces it to the high probability of death or injury during the construction of the U.S. transcontinental railroad in the late 1860s. During its construction, unstable bottles of nitroglycerine were used for blasting. Chinese workers reportedly were lowered over cliffs by rope and boatswain's chairs to set the nitroglycerine in place. In this work, if they were not lifted back up before the blast, serious injury or death would result. Although these accounts of construction techniques have been debunked as mythmaking after the work was complete, it is undeniable that many Chinese immigrants died while building the railroad. According to a newspaper article published in 1870, 20,000 pounds (9,100 kg) of bones from Chinese railroad workers were shipped to China for interment. The article calculated the bones were from 1,200 workers. It is estimated that 20,000 Chinese immigrants worked to build the railroad.

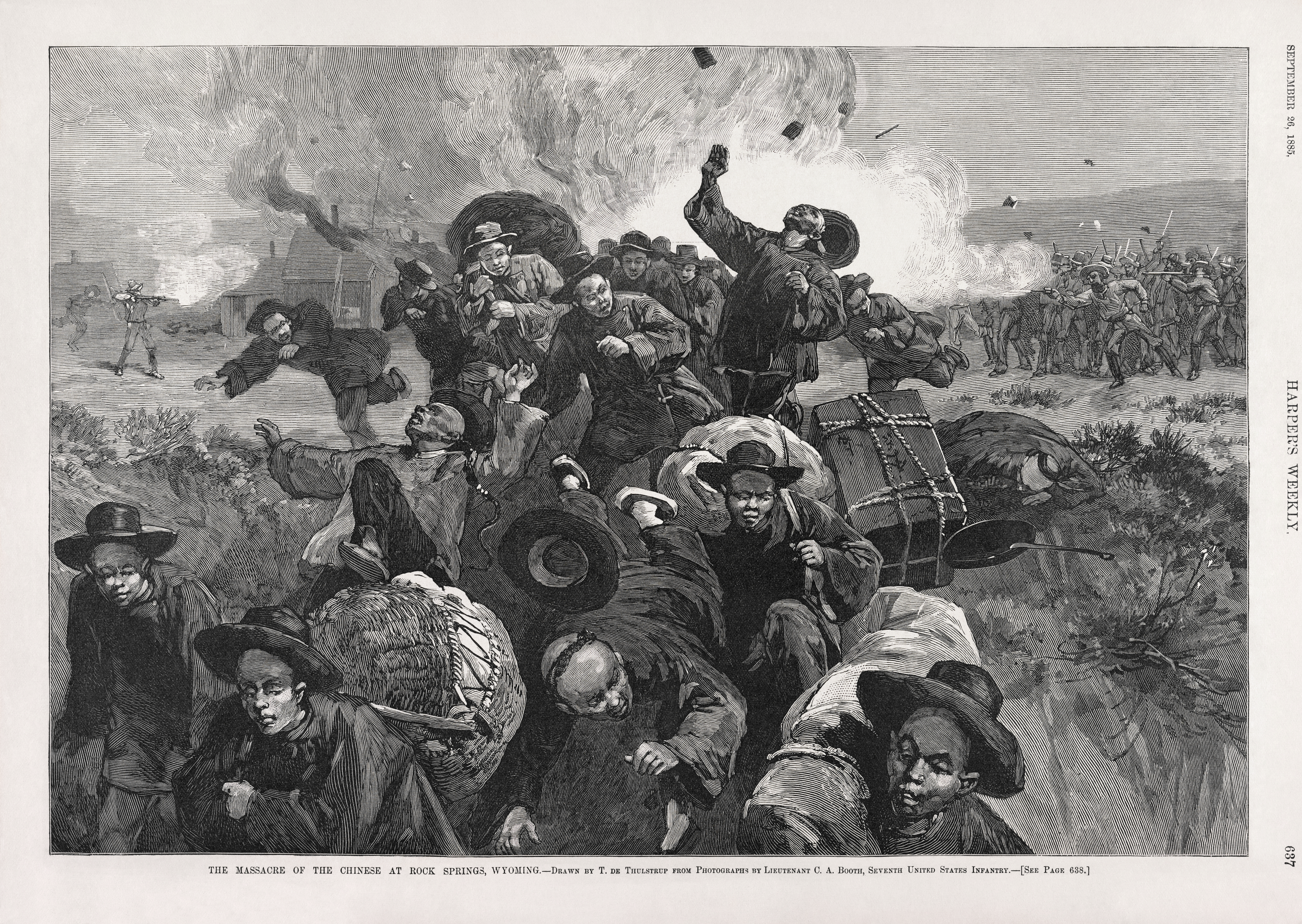
Rock Springs massacre (1885), published in Harper's Weekly

A third possibility is in reference to the low probability of a fair verdict in murder trials with a Chinese victim, assisted partly by California state law first issued in 1850. The conviction of a white man for murdering a Chinese miner was overturned in the case of People v. Hall (1854). In that ruling, the California Supreme Court expanded the definition of "black person" in the California Crimes and Punishments Act of 1850 to exclude "all races other than the Caucasian", throwing out evidence provided by a Chinese immigrant's testimony. The law was amended in 1863 to explicitly exclude testimony from witnesses of certain races: "No Indian, or person having one half or more of Indian blood, or Mongolian or Chinese, shall be permitted to give evidence in favor or against any white person." In a second case, People v. Brady (1870), the Supreme Court of California upheld the statute against the Equal Protection Clause of the Fourteenth Amendment to the United States Constitution, stating "the power of testifying is neither an object of desire, nor in any sense a right". New evidence laws were passed in 1872, superseding the prior rules and restoring the right to testify to Chinese Americans.

Bill Bryson believed the phrase could be traced to the Rock Springs massacre of 1885, referring to the forced expulsion of Chinese American residents, whose chances of living were slimmed by the dual threat of armed mobs and freezing overnight temperatures. Amy Uyematsu also related it to the Rock Springs, writing that the phrase had grim and bitter reality if the fair treatment of Chinese immigrants was impossible. In 1887, as many as 34 Chinese gold miners were massacred along the Snake River in Oregon by a gang of white horse thieves, typical of the anti-Chinese violence in Oregon of the time. Three were arrested and tried for the massacre in Oregon, but none were convicted.

=== Delicate chinaware ===
Tad Dorgan used the phrase in a 1914 comic

The "chinaman" (note the lowercase "c") can also refer to a dealer of porcelain from China; the "chinaware" they sold was notoriously delicate and fragile. Based on this, several scholars have advanced a hypothesis that "chinaman's chance" refers to the low probability of avoiding broken chinaware during the long journey from their sources in China to chinaman shops in Europe.

William Morris advanced the lower-case "chinaman" hypothesis in 1957, stating "the phrase 'a chinaman's chance' accurately describes the odds against a merchant of china if he were to find 'a bull in his chinashop!'"

In addition, Peter Tamony concluded in 1965 the phrase can be traced back to the sport of boxing in early 19th-century Great Britain. Tamony's hypothesis is based on terms such as having a crockery chin or a china chin, which characterize some pugilists as delicate and fragile. An equivalent American idiom would be to say a fighter has a glass jaw. Tamony stated the lowercase phrase chinaman's chance was transferred to the United States via Australia, but based this on his belief the first use of the phrase was from 1914, in a cartoon drawn by Tad Dorgan and published in the San Francisco Call.

In fact, the phrase was already in use by 1893, and as Kenneth Porter wrote in a Western Folklore article published in 1966, "in American usage [Chinaman's chance] is clearly [a reference] to the little chance a native of China would have in any controversy with white Americans. Americans who use the expression, if they consider its origin at all, probably associate it with the anti-Chinese agitation of the 1870's and '80's." Under this interpretation, the phrase may have originated as local slang in California and spread via the journalism of William Randolph Hearst and his flagship newspaper San Francisco Examiner in the 1890s.

== Usage history ==
Chinaman's chance
It means very little likelihood of success. And if you use the term, it means you have very little likelihood of brain activity.

— Michael Coard, 2012 Philadelphia column

In describing a potential race between a bicyclist and a thoroughbred racing horse in 1893, The World quoted a horse expert as saying "The bicyclist would win sure ... I don't think the horse would have a Chinaman's chance to beat him." The capitalized term "Chinaman" had become "thoroughly entwined with anti-Chinese racial animus" by the early 20th century and the phrase "Chinaman's chance" carried the same pejorative connotations, alluding to the low probability of success resulting from "the endless social barriers that were thrown up against Chinese immigrants seeking opportunities to advance".

In 2018, Governor of West Virginia Jim Justice used the phrase "Chinaman's chance" to describe the low probability of passing a natural gas tax, for which he received criticism.

=== Cultural usage ===
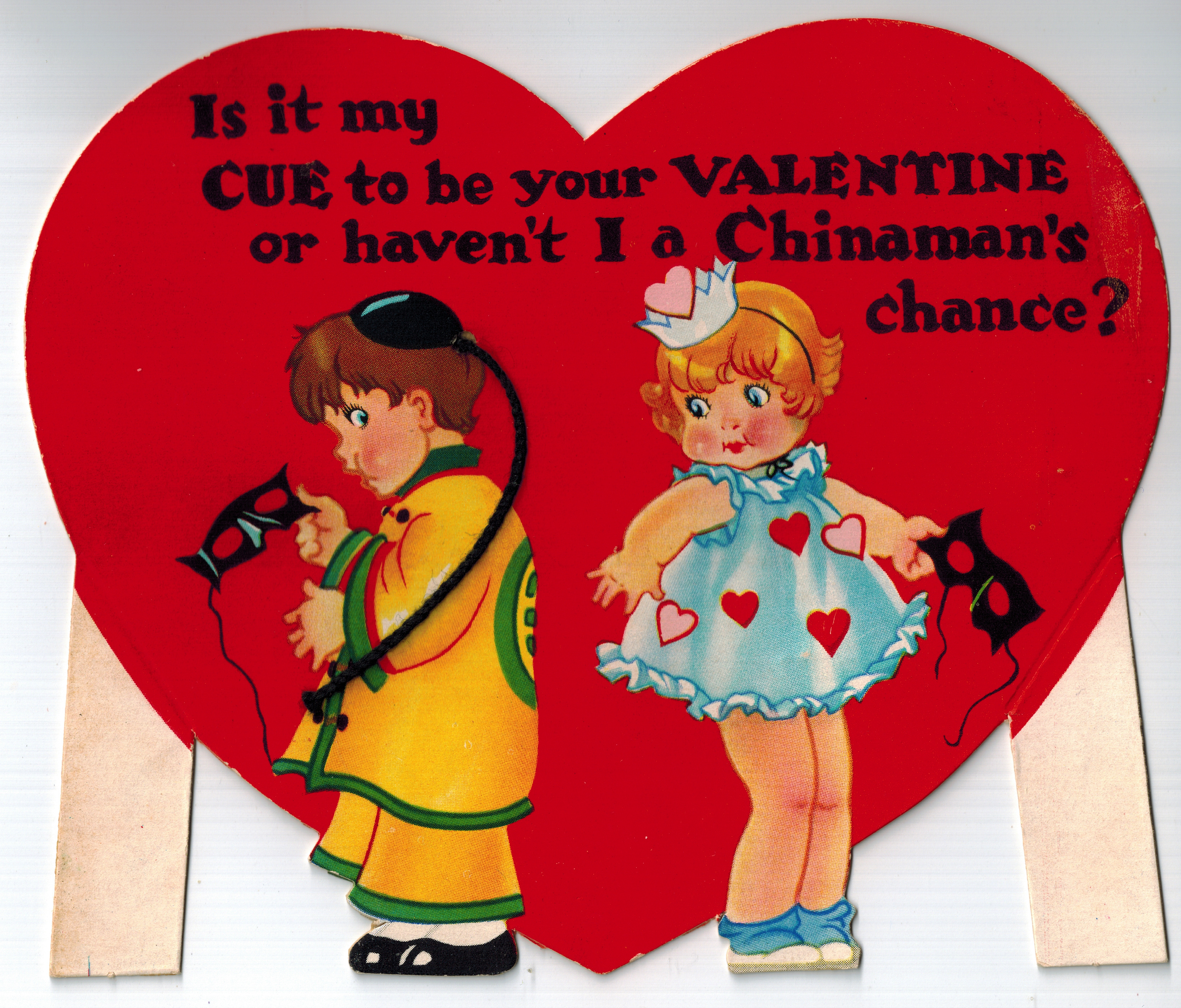
Children's Valentine's Day greeting card featuring the phrase, c. 1930s

==== Literature ====
- A Chinaman's Chance, 1919 short story by American writer Harold Lamb
- Chinaman's Chance, 1938 short story mystery by American writer Maxwell Grant
- "Asia is rising against me. / I haven't got a chinaman's chance. / I'd better consider my national resources." — Allen Ginsberg, America (1956)
- Chinaman's Chance, 1978 thriller novel by American writer Ross Thomas
- A Chinaman's Chance, poem in Dwarf Bamboo (1987) by Chinese-American poet Marilyn Chin

==== Nonfiction ====
- Chinaman's Chance, 1932 short recollection by American writer Arthur Mason
- Chinaman's Chance, 1940 autobiography by No-yong Park
- Chinaman's Chance: The Life Story of Elmer Wok Wai, 1969 memoir cowritten with Veta Griggs
- A Chinaman's chance: the Chinese on the Rocky Mountain mining frontier, 2000 narrative by Professor Liping Zhu
- A Chinaman's chance: one family's journey and the Chinese American dream, 2004 memoir by Eric Liu

==== Art ====
- Not a Chinaman's Chance (1893/94), wax sculpture and painting by Charles Marion Russell
- "Not a Chinaman's Chance" (2007), song released by Steve Missal on the album American Stories Through Song
- A Chinaman's Chance, A Choy's Chance! (2019), six-movement concerto by Jon Jang paying tribute to the legacy of historian Philip Choy

==== Film ====
The phrase "a Chinaman's chance" is used in the following films:

- Way Out West (1930; dir. Fred Niblo), by William Haines (as Windy)
- Bad Girl (1931; dir. Frank Borzage), by the actor James Dunn (as Eddie Collins).
- Chinaman's Chance (1933; dir. Ub Iwerks), an animated short featuring Flip the Frog.
- You Only Live Once (1937; dir. Fritz Lang).
- Lost Horizon (1937; dir. Frank Capra).
- Frontier Marshal (1939; dir. Allan Dwan), by Randolph Scott (as Wyatt Earp) to Cesar Romero (as Doc Holliday).
- The People vs. Dr. Kildare (1941; dir. Harold S. Bucquet), by Alma Kruger (as Molly Byrd).
- Silver Bullet (1985; dir. Dan Attias by Gary Busey as Uncle Red
- Dragon: The Bruce Lee Story (1993; dir. Rob Cohen), when Bruce Lee (portrayed by Jason Scott Lee) is on his way to America in a ship.
- Railroad to Hell: A Chinaman's Chance (2008; dir. Aki Aleong)

== See also ==
- Buckley's chance
