= Kuku (gamer) =

Filipino professional Dota 2 player

Carlo Palad
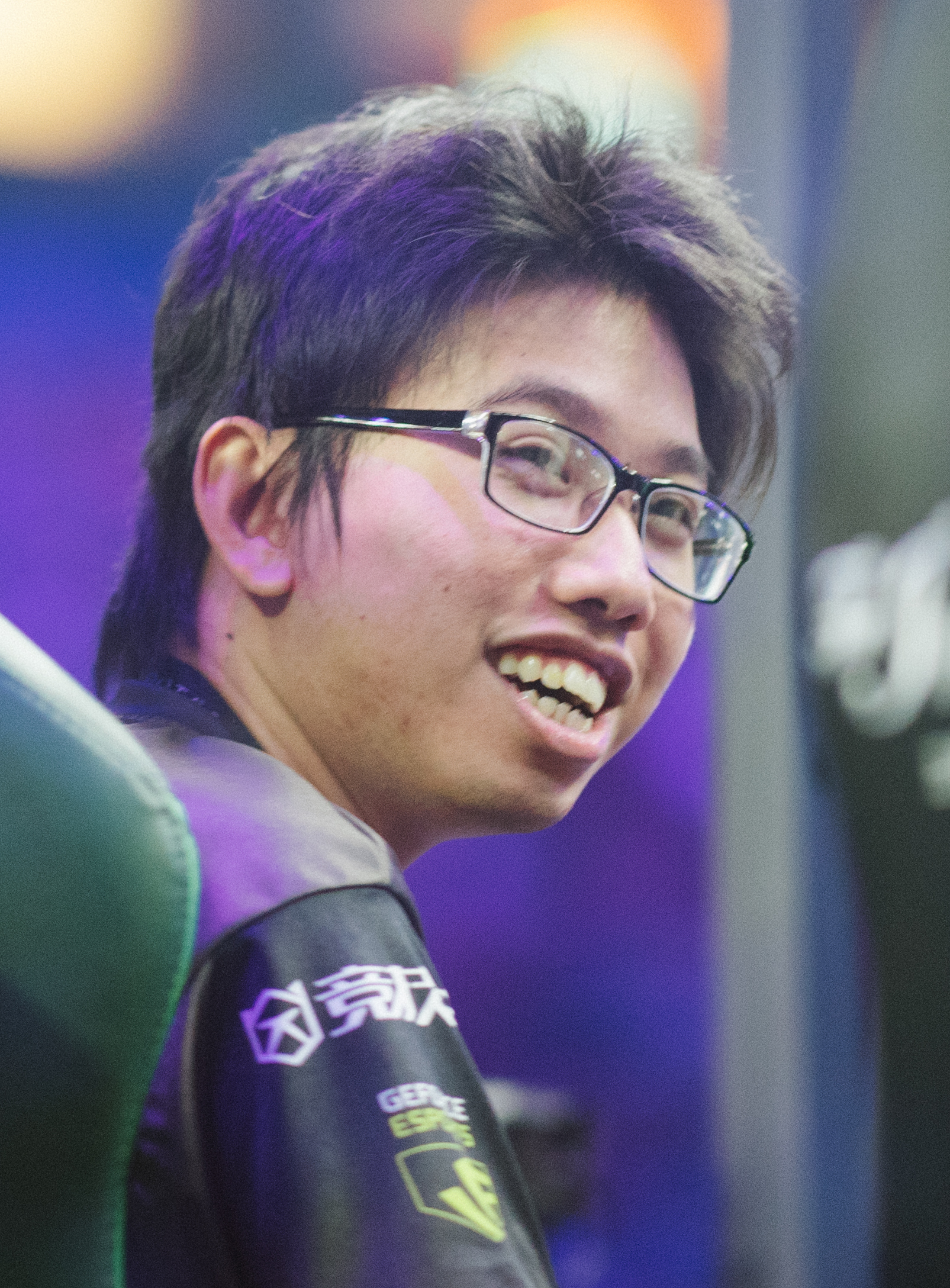
- Palad in 2018

Current team
- Team: Talon Esports
- Role: Captain / Offlaner
- Game: Dota 2

Personal information
- Nickname: Kuku
- Born: Carlo Palad; September 21, 1996 (age 29); Philippines
- Nationality: Filipino

Carlo Palad (born September 21, 1996), better known as Kuku, is a Filipino professional Dota 2 player. He currently serves as the captain and offlaner for Talon Esports. Palad previously played for TNC Predator, where he was part of the roster that eliminated OG from The International 2016. He has participated in several editions of The International throughout his career.

== Career ==
=== 2015–2019: TNC Predator ===
Palad began his professional career in the original Defense of the Ancients (Dota 1) before transitioning to Dota 2. He joined the Philippine-based organization TNC Pro Team (later TNC Predator). During The International 2016, Palad played the mid-lane position. His team eliminated the tournament favorites, OG, in a 2–0 series in the lower bracket, a result that allowed TNC to finish in 7th–8th place. This match is often cited by fans as a significant moment in the team's history.

Following the 2016 season, Palad transitioned from the mid-lane to the offlane role. In 2019, he competed with TNC Predator at The International 2019, where the team finished in 9th–12th place. Following the tournament, Palad announced on Twitter that he was looking for a new team. He and his teammate Nico "eyyou" Barcelon officially left the organization in September 2019. They were the last remaining members of the roster that competed at The International 2016.

=== 2020–2022: Geek Fam and T1 ===
In 2020, Palad played for Geek Fam. However, the team disbanded its roster in September 2020 due to the cancellation of the Dota Pro Circuit caused by the COVID-19 pandemic. Following the disbandment, he formed a temporary team called "Among Us" to compete in the BTS Pro Series: SEA Season 3.

Palad subsequently joined the South Korean organization T1 as their captain. He was unable to attend the ONE Esports Singapore Major after testing positive for COVID-19. He returned to the active roster for the WePlay AniMajor in June 2021, helping the team reach the Upper Bracket Final. At The International 2021 (TI10), Palad led T1 to a 7th–8th place finish, matching his highest personal placement at the world championship.

In 2022, T1 failed to qualify for The International 2022. They were eliminated in the qualifiers after losing to Vici Gaming. Following the loss, Palad stated that his contract with T1 had ended and he was exploring opportunities with other teams. He expressed a desire to continue playing the offlane role but noted he was open to transitioning to support positions.

=== 2024–present: Talon Esports ===
As of 2025, Palad plays for Flipster Talon (Talon Esports). In January 2025, he secured a spot at ESL One Raleigh 2025 after he and his team defeated Team Kukuys in the Southeast Asia closed qualifiers.

During May 2025, Palad captained the squad at DreamLeague Season 26. He led the roster through the group stages with victories against Yakult Brothers, NAVI Junior, and Team Liquid. Despite a loss to Parivision in the second group stage, Palad finished in the top three, earning US$80,000. This performance qualified him for the Esports World Cup in Riyadh.

Later that year, Palad failed to qualify for The International 2025 following losses to Team Nemesis and Boom Esports.

== 2018 Chongqing Major ban ==
In November 2018, Palad was involved in a controversy regarding the use of a racial slur during a public match. He typed a derogatory phrase Ching chong often used to mock the Chinese language while playing against Chinese players. The incident occurred shortly after a similar incident involving another Filipino player, Rolen Andrei Gabriel "Skemberlu" Ong.

The incident led to a backlash from the Chinese Dota 2 community, and LGD Gaming refused to practice with TNC Predator. Reports surfaced that the municipal government of Chongqing would ban Palad from entering the city for the upcoming Chongqing Major.

On December 3, 2018, game developer Valve Corporation officially banned Palad from the tournament. In a blog post, Valve stated that TNC had "mishandled" the situation and attempted to cover up the incident rather than taking proper responsibility. As a penalty, TNC Predator was also docked 20 percent of their Dota Pro Circuit points. Palad took a personal leave of absence from the team in December 2018 but returned to the active roster in January 2019.

The ban received mixed reactions within the esports community. Some casters, including Grant "GranDGranT" Harris and David "GoDZ" Parker, threatened to boycott the major in support of Palad, arguing that a career-affecting ban was too severe for a mistake. Conversely, esports host Paul "Redeye" Chaloner commended Valve for taking action against racism.

== Player profile ==
Palad is frequently referred to by media outlets as the "Godfather of Philippine Dota" due to his long tenure in the scene and his efforts to assist other Filipino players. He has stated that his goal is to see more representation of Southeast Asian players in the grand finals of international tournaments.
