= Chinese people in Zimbabwe =

Total population
- 10,000 (2016)

Regions with significant populations
- Harare

Related ethnic groups
- Overseas Chinese

Chinese people in Zimbabwe are a small community that grew in size in the 2000s as an influx of Chinese shopkeepers settled in the country.

Initially the arrival of shopkeepers from China aroused hostile local attitudes with products sold by Chinese merchants derisively called zhing-zhong. However, during the worst of the Zimbabwe economic crisis, Chinese shopkeepers were able to import basic goods despite the disruptive effect of hyperinflation, bringing some relief to Zimbabwean consumers. The ability of Chinese stores to continue business won them the appreciation of local consumers.

Under official cultural and educational cooperation agreements, there are as of 2009 three teachers and nine medical personnel from China in the country.

== Notable people ==
- Fay Chung, politician
- Chipo Chung, model and actress
- Adam Chicksen, football player
