= Fergburger =

Burger restaurant in New Zealand

Coordinates: 45.031729°S 168.659500°E

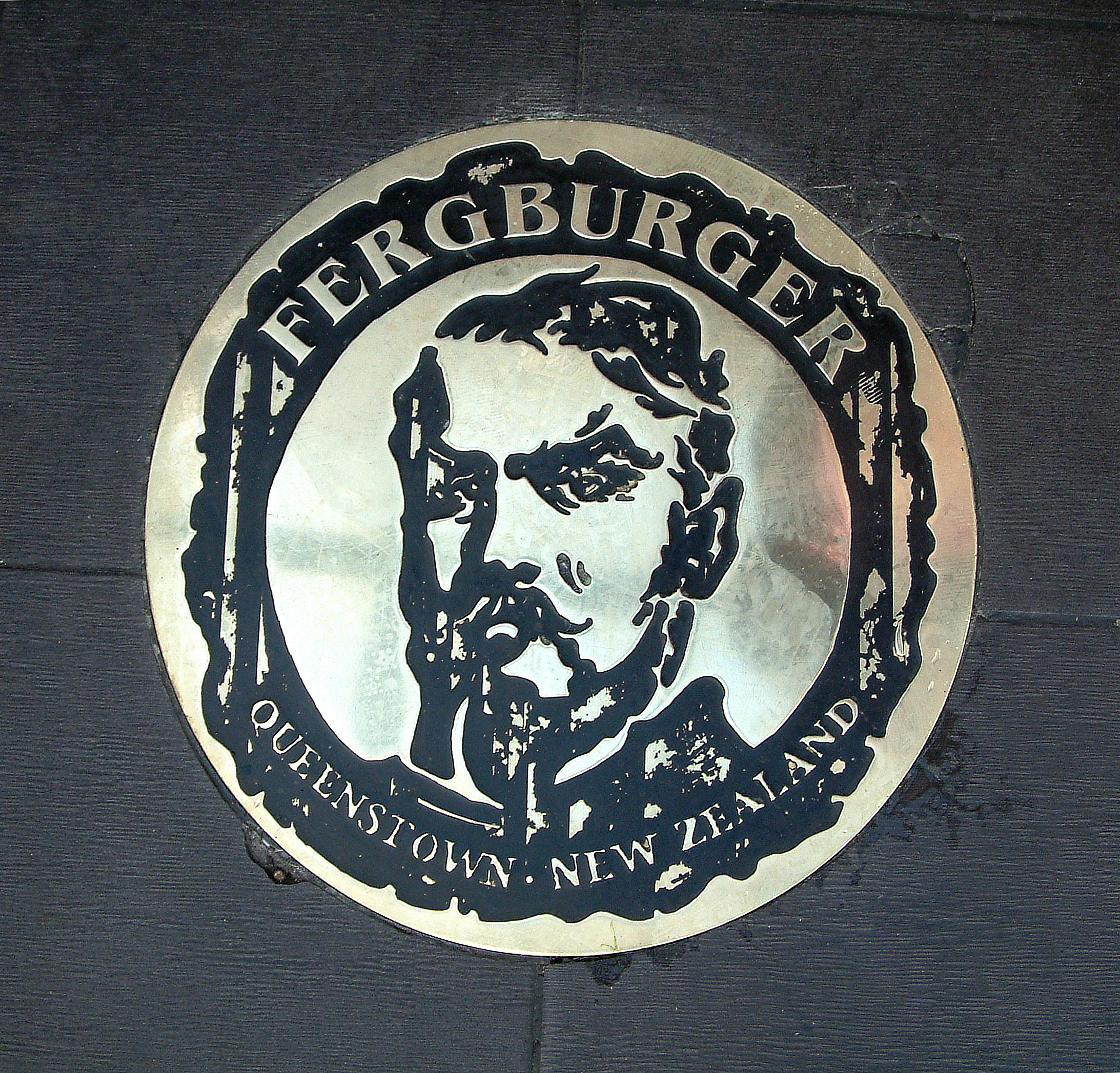
- Fergburger Logo at entrance to shop
- Type: Private limited liability company
- Industry: Restaurants
- Genre: Fast food
- Founded: December 22, 2000; 25 years ago
- Products: Burgers; French fries; Onion rings; Squid pieces

Fergburger is a hamburger restaurant located in Queenstown, New Zealand, which specialises in gourmet hamburgers. Their burgers include those prepared with lamb, tofu, cod, falafel, a swine-and-chicken mix and venison.

== History ==
Fergburger started in February 2001, operating out of a garage off Cow Lane, its obscure location making it hard to find but conversely giving it something of a novelty status, relying on word of mouth to attract customers. It is now located on Shotover Street next to the new addition of Ferg Baker.

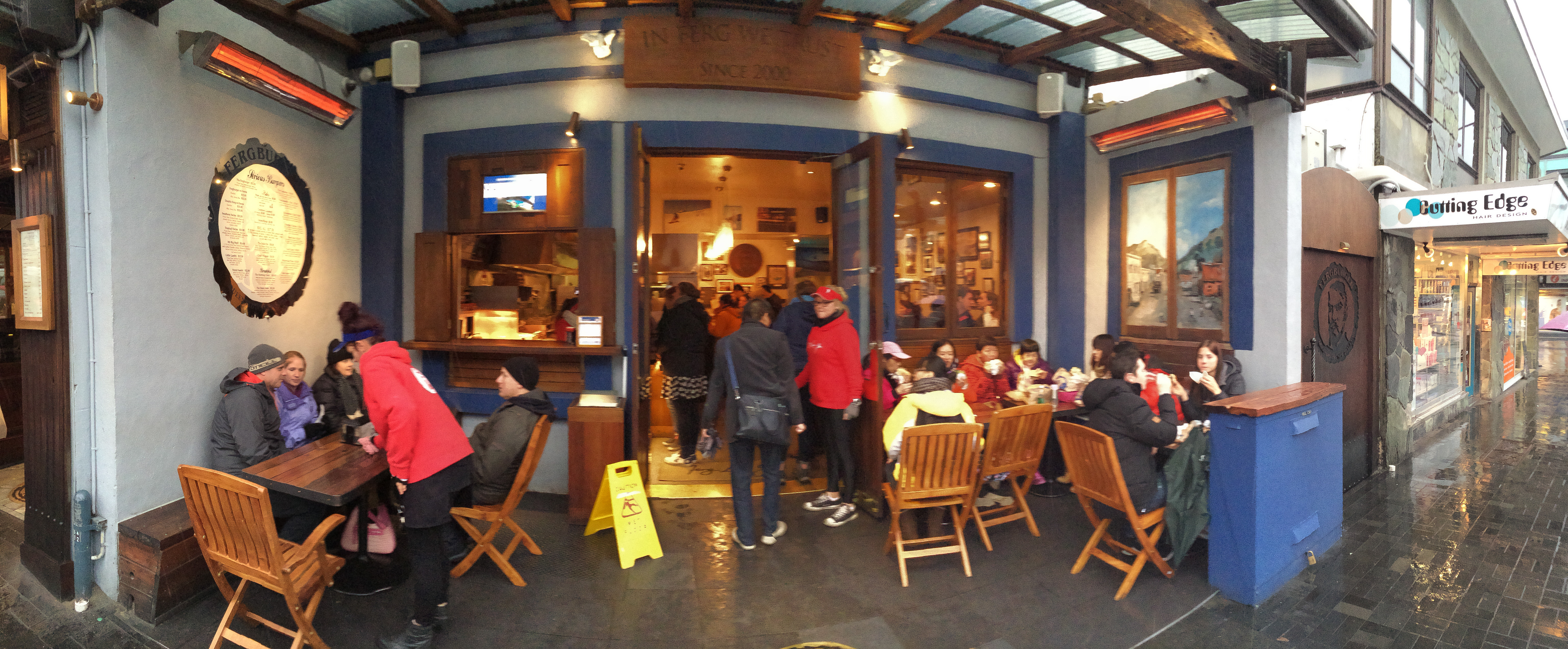
The Fergburger restaurant in Queenstown

=== Racial slur incident ===
In 2025, Fergburger apologised for identifying a customer on a shop receipt with a stereotypical label in mock Chinese pronunciation. The employee responsible was later sacked.

== Ferg Baker ==
Ferg Baker is a new premises which was an expansion of Fergburger and opened for business in 2011. It is a bakery that sells pies, pastries, sandwiches, breads and cakes.

== Ferg Bar ==
Fergburger opened Ferg's Bar to the public In July 2020 beside its existing bakery.

== See also ==
- List of restaurants in New Zealand
- List of fast food restaurants in New Zealand
- List of hamburger restaurants
