= Chinaman (politics) =

Chinaman is an epithet for political mentors and backers that entered the lexicon in the politics of Chicago, Illinois, U.S., in the 1900s and is still in use today. An example of the use of the term appeared in the January 27, 2004 Chicago Sun-Times: "Before the age of political correctness, Munoz would have been called Torres' chinaman, and in City Hall, that's still what they'd call him, but if you prefer, you can stick with mentor or patron."

== See also ==
- Chinaman (term)
- Chinese in Chicago
