= W. Augustus Barratt =

Scottish-American composer and lyricist

Walter Augustus Barratt (3 June 1873 – 12 April 1947) was a Scottish-born, American songwriter and musician.

== Early life and songs ==
Barratt was born 3 June 1873 in Kilmarnock, the son of composer John Barratt; the family later lived in Paisley. In 1893 he won a scholarship for composition to the Royal College of Music. In his early twenties he contributed to The Scottish Students' Song Book, with three of his own song compositions and numerous arrangements. By the end of 1897 he had published dozens of songs, such as Sir Patrick Spens, The Death of Cuthullin, an album of his own compositions, and arrangements of ten songs by Samuel Lover.

He then, living in London, turned his attention to staged musical comedy, co-creating, with Adrian Ross, The Tree Dumas Skiteers, a skit, based on Sydney Grundy's The Musketeers that starred Herbert Beerbohm Tree. He co-composed with Howard Talbot the successful Kitty Grey (1900).

He continued to write songs and to receive recognition for them. The 1901 and 1902 BBC Promenade Concerts, "The Proms", included four of his compositions, namely "Come back, Sweet Love", "The Mermaid", "My Peggy" and "Private Donald". His setting of "My Ships", a poem by Ella Wheeler Wilcox, was performed by Clara Butt and republished several times. It was performed four times, with different singers, in the 1913 and 1914 Proms.

== America ==
In September 1904 he went to live in New York City, finding employment with shows on Broadway, including the following roles:

- on-stage actor (Sir Benjamin Backbite) in Lady Teazle (1904-1905), a musical version of The School for Scandal;
- musical director of The Little Michus (1907), also featuring songs by Barratt;
- co-composer of Miss Pocahontas (1907), a musical comedy;
- musical director of The Love Cure (1909–1910), a musical romance;
- composer of The Girl and the Drummer (1910), a musical romance with book by George Broadhurst. Tried out in Chicago and elsewhere, it did not do well and never reached Broadway;
- musical director of The Quaker Girl (1911–1912);
- co-composer and musical director of My Best Girl (1912);
- musical director of The Sunshine Girl (1913);
- musical director of The Girl who Smiles (1915), a musical comedy;
- musical director and contributor to music and lyrics of Her Soldier Boy (1916–1917);
- composer, lyricist and musical director of Fancy Free (1918), with book by Dorothy Donnelly and Edgar Smith;
- contributor of a song to The Passing Show of 1918;
- composer and musical director of Little Simplicity (1918), with book and lyrics by Rida Johnson Young;
- contributor of lyrics to The Melting of Molly (1918–1919), a musical comedy;
- musical director of What's in a Name? (1920), a musical revue

=== 1921 in London ===
Though domiciled in the US, he made several visits back to England. During an extended stay in 1921 he played a major part in the creation of two shows, both produced by Charles B. Cochran, namely

- League of Notions, at the New Oxford Theatre, for which he composed the music and co-wrote, with John Murray Anderson, the lyrics;
- Fun of the Fayre, at the London Pavilion, for which similarly he wrote the music and co-wrote the lyrics

=== Back to Broadway ===
Back in the US he returned to Broadway, working as

- composer and lyricist of Jack and Jill (1923), a musical comedy;
- musical director of The Silver Swan (1929), a musical romance

=== Radio plays ===
In later years he wrote plays and operettas mostly for radio, such as:

- Snapshots: a radioperetta (1929)
- Sushannah and the Brush Wielders: a play in 1 act (1929)
- The Magic Voice: a radio series (1933)
- Men of Action: a series of radio sketches (1933)
- Say, Uncle: a radio series (1933)
- Sealed Orders: a radio drama (1934)
- Sergeant Gabriel (with Hugh Abercrombie) (1945)

== Personal ==
In 1897 in London he married Lizzie May Stoner. They had one son, Walter Alfred Barratt (b. 1900 and known as 'Bill'), and one daughter, Margery May Barratt (b.1901, Teddington). In 1904 he emigrated to the US and lived in New York City. His first marriage ended in divorce in 1915 and, in 1918, he married Ethel J Moore, who was American. In 1924, he became a naturalized American citizen. He died on 12 April 1947 in New York City.
