= J. Will Callahan =

American lyricist (1874–1946)

J. Will Callahan (March 17, 1874 – November 15, 1946) was an American lyricist. He was also partially blind.

He wrote lyrics for songs including "Gasoline" (1913), "Smiles" (used in The Passing Show of 1918), and more notoriously to modern ears, the 1917 song "Ching Chong".

"Smiles", for which he is best known, became a hit and earned Callahan and composer Lee S. Roberts about $500,000. Callahan's primary collaborator was Max Kortlander.
