= Peter Tamony =

American folk-etymologist (1902 – 1985)

Peter Tamony (October 9, 1902 – July 24, 1985) was an American folk-etymologist who is noted for his research on American colloquial speech, Jazz music and sports.

== Early life ==
Tamony was born at home in San Francisco, California, to Irish immigrants. He attended a parochial school at St. Peter's Church, and learned Latin and rhetoric from the progressive Father Peter Yorke, a supporter of modernizing the church, organized labor, and Irish independence. In 1905, Tamony's family bought a flat at 2876 24th Street in the Mission District where he lived for eighty years until his death at Saint Francis Memorial Hospital.

== Interest in language ==
Tamony first became interested in etymology when he noticed various speech patterns. At the age of 20, he was diagnosed with tuberculosis and was unable to participate in sports; this led him to pay close attention to sports in newspapers, and from there to analyzing how people used words. His sources eventually included any kind of material he could collect such as posters and blues records.

He later became a real estate broker and notary, but for more than 50 years, Tamony collected examples of language, storing hundreds of cardboard cartons with file cards, newspaper clippings, conversation notes, and literature quotations. Folklorist Archie Green reminisced about the late Tamony as his mentor: "I look back at Peter Tamony as a keeper of a Celtic clan's lore, a bard in a magic three-storied castle – not in legendary Erin, but rather in San Francisco's Mission District."

== Legacy ==
On April 8, 1986, Kathleen Tamony donated her brother's collection to the University of Missouri. It is now archived at the State Historical Society of Missouri.

== Selected works ==
- Tamony, Peter (Jan 1969). "Hoodlums and Folk Etymology". Western Folklore. 28 (1). Western States Folklore Society: 44–48. doi:10.2307/1499108. JSTOR 1499108..
- Tamony, Peter (Summer 1981). "Tripping out from San Francisco". American Speech. 56 (2). Duke University Press: 98–103. doi:10.2307/455009. JSTOR 455009. PMID 11623430..
