= Lee S. Roberts =

American composer (1884–1949)

Leland Stanford Roberts (1884–1949), commonly known as Lee S. Roberts, was an American composer and pianist.

He is best known for his composition 'Smiles' with lyricist J. Will Callahan, written in 1917, but was a prolific composer across many genres of music.

He was also the vice-president of the QRS Music Roll Company, and recorded hundreds of piano rolls under his name and also the pseudonym Stanford Robar. He was particularly active in recording salon and ballad style music.

He lived in San Francisco.

== Partial list of compositions ==
- After All
- A Little Birch Canoe & You
- Amourette
- Answer
- Autumn of Life, The
- Baby Days
- Broken Moon
- Cheerio
- "Ching Chong"
- Drowsy Baby
- Harlequin
- Harriman Cake Walk
- Hawaiian Nights
- High Ball
- Hula Dreams
- I Miss You Miss America
- Italian Nights
- Lonesome-That's All
- Lover's Lane
- Ma Belle
- Mammy's Lullaby
- March of the Tanks
- Montezuma
- Moon Dreams
- My Country Forever
- Nailo
- Oh! Harold
- Patches
- Please
- Sad Hawaiian Sea
- Slumber Moon
- Smiles
- Souvenir Of The West
- Story of Peter Rabbit
- T'Jours A Moi
- Triennial "K.T." March
- That Old Fashioned Mother Of Mine
- Valse Parisienne
- Wanting You So
- Without Thee
- You Don't Know
