= John Chinaman =

Stock caricature of a Chinese laborer seen in cartoons of the 19th century

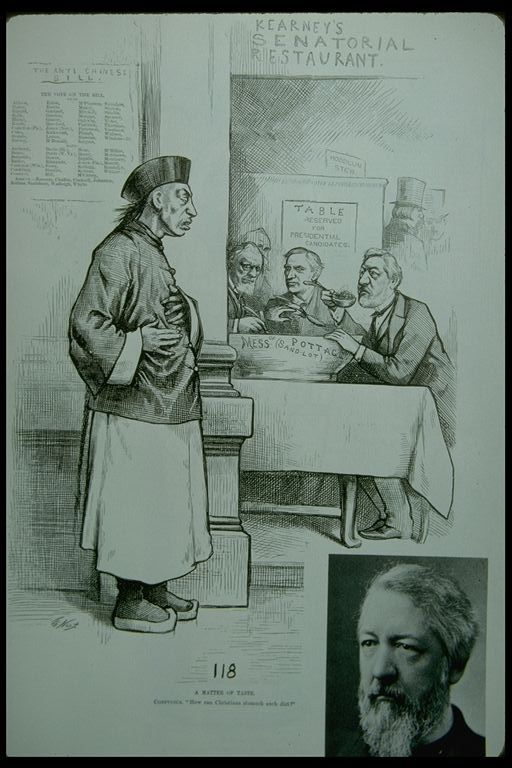
John Confucius

John Chinaman was a stock caricature of a Chinese laborer seen in cartoons of the 19th century. Also referenced by Mark Twain and popular American songs of the period, John Chinaman represented, in western society, a typical persona of China. He was typically depicted with a long queue and wearing an Asian conical hat.

== History ==
Following growing European contacts with China via Jesuit missionaries in the 16th century, initial caricatures of the Chinese often viewed them as intelligent scholars and philosophers. Following the Opium Wars, the caricature changed with the Chinese now being viewed as stupid, cowardly and speaking an incomprehensible language. From this, the John Chinaman and Heathen Chinee caricatures became popular in British and American print. According to the Oxford English Dictionary, the term first emerged with British sailors who, uninterested in learning how to pronounce the names of the Chinese stewards, firemen, and sailors who worked as part of their crews, came up with the generic nickname of "John". John Chinaman minstrel songs from the 1850s presented Chinese men as effeminate and unmanly. Such songs frequently revolved around John Chinaman's failed pursuit of white women.

American political cartoonist Thomas Nast, who often depicted John Chinaman, created a variant, John Confucius, to represent Chinese political figures. In Nast's cartoon "A Matter of Taste", published March 15, 1879, John Confucius expresses disapproval of Senator James G. Blaine for his support of the Chinese Exclusion Act. Blaine is shown dining in "Kearney's Senatorial Restaurant"—a reference to Denis Kearney, the leader of a violent anti-Chinese movement in California. John Confucius asks, "How can Christians stomach such diet?".

The John Chinaman caricature continued through the mid-20th century but ceased being used following the People's Republic of China's reform and opening up policy due to many in the Western world now having more interaction with Chinese people and gaining more of an awareness of what Chinese people were like.
