= Chinaman Island =

Island in Victoria, Australia

Coordinates: 38.2379°S 145.3115°E

Chinaman Island is an uninhabited island located in Western Port, Victoria, south-eastern Australia. It lies about 4 km north of French Island. It is considered to be of State botanical and zoological significance. It is accessible at low tide by fording a small tidal creek in Warneet.
