= Quiet Odyssey =

1990 autobiography by Mary Paik Lee

Quiet Odyssey: A Pioneer Korean Woman in America is an autobiography by Mary Paik Lee, published by University of Washington Press in 1990. Sucheng Chan wrote the introduction, which is 30 pages long.

At the time of publication, it was the sole full length book about a 1903-1905 arrival immigrant from Korea to the United States that was still in print at the time. There was also an out of print book about a Korean immigrant who arrived in that time period. Additionally, it was the first autobiography to have coverage of a whole life that was in a full length format and that was written by an American woman of Asian ancestry.

== Background ==
The work originated from a manuscript. Wayne Patterson of St. Norbert College stated that Chan was "largely responsible" for obtaining the manuscript and facilitating it being made into a full length volume.

== Contents ==
The author, in this work, also writes about historical events happening during her lifetime.

Patterson stated that the "unbridled optimism" expressed, despite a lack of money and prejudice, was "striking, almost quaint".

The volume has multiple photographs of the author's family. Reviewer Glenna Matthews referred to them as "eloquent".

== Reception ==
Elaine H. Kim of University of California Berkeley wrote that the book is a "profoundly significant accomplishment", and that she praised both the "vivid" narrative from the author and the notes from Chan.

Publishers Weekly wrote that the book is "accessible" and that the notes given by Lee "make [it] a worthwhile addition to the scholarship on Asian American culture."

In a web page about Notable Asian Americans in Riverside, the University of California Riverside noted that the book is "a remarkable first-person account of Korean American immigrant life in the early part of the 20th century".
