= Mary Paik Lee =

Korean American writer (1900–1995)

- Born: August 17, 1900; Pyongyang, Korean Empire (now North Korea)
- Died: February 14, 1995 (aged 94); San Francisco, California, U.S.
- Citizenship: American
- Occupation: Writer

Korean name
- Hangul: 백광선
- Hanja: 白廣善
- RR: Baek Gwangseon
- MR: Paek Kwangsŏn

Mary Paik Lee (August 17, 1900 – February 14, 1995) was a Korean American writer most known for her autobiography, Quiet Odyssey: A Pioneer Korean Woman in America. She was born in the Korean Empire and moved to the United States in 1905, briefly settling in Riverside, California, in 1906. Lee and her family relocated throughout California in search of employment, eventually landing in Willows, CA, where Lee attended high school as the only Asian in her class.

Over the course of her life, Lee, her parents, and her husband would suffer many hardships. Her memoir, Quiet Odyssey, was published in 1990. It is noted for being one of the few memoirs by an Asian American woman, and the only memoir by a Korean American woman that covers the majority of the twentieth century. She provides an important cultural viewpoint on the last century, from the perspective of one of America's first Korean pioneers.

== Biography ==
=== Early life and emigration (1900–1905) ===
Lee was born Paek Kuang-Sun in Pyongyang (now the capital of North Korea) in the Korean Empire in 1900. Her father, Paik Sin Koo, came from a line of ministers and teachers and was preparing for ordination prior to the family’s emigration.

For many Koreans, their stable life in Korea was disrupted during the Russo-Japanese War when Japan began to tighten its control over the Korean peninsula. In 1905, the Paik family was unexpectedly driven out of their home when the Japanese military demanded the family vacate the property so it could be used to house soldiers. During the family’s flight, Lee’s father encountered recruiters for Hawaiian sugar plantations and signed a labor contract that provided the family free passage to Hawaii in exchange for his work.

=== Life in Hawaii (1905–1906) ===
The Paik family first settled on a plantation located in Oahu, where Lee’s father performed various manual labor such as hoeing and weeding. Though the family could not afford much during their time on the plantation, they remained within an insular Korean community centered around a local church. When Lee’s second brother, Daw Sun (Ernest), was born, Lee’s father borrowed money from friends to pay for the passage to California to seek better economic prospects for the family.

=== Settlement in Riverside (1906–1912) ===
In California, the Paik family settled in Riverside, where they joined a settlement of single Korean men and several familiar families from their home village, including the family of activist Ahn Chang-ho. The community lived in a “camp” (known as Pachappa Camp) consisting of one-room shacks originally built in the 1880s for Chinese railroad workers. To make a living for themselves, the family started a business to cook meals for the local Korean laborers, which required them to acquire industrial cooking pots and groceries from local Chinese merchants.

On Saturdays, Mary would go to the slaughterhouse and collect animal organs that the butchers threw out and thought were not appropriate to sell. She competed with Mexican children for the preferred pieces of meat while the butchers laughed at them. At one point, she told her father that she did not want to continue going because they were making fun of her, but her father told her to be grateful that the butchers threw out the meat, or else they would starve.

=== Education and cultural adaptation ===
Lee began her American education at the Washington Irving School in Riverside. On her first day, she was intimidated by a group of girls who danced around her in the playground, chanting “Ching chong Chinaman”. She was also frightened when the teacher welcomed her, so she ran back home.

As Lee and her brother Meung Sun navigated their new environment, they soon learned that their schoolmates found Korean names too difficult to remember and decided to give their younger siblings American names. They named their brother born in Hawaii (Daw Sun) “Ernest” and their brother born in Riverside “Stanford”.

=== Adulthood and marriage (1912–1940) ===
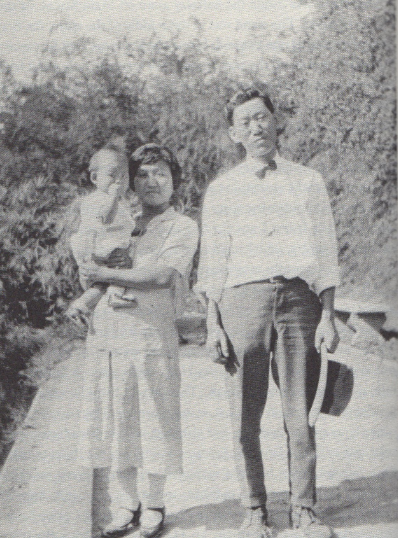
Mary Paik Lee with her husband H.M. Lee with their first-born son Henry, 1926

The Paik family eventually moved from Riverside to Willows, California, where Lee attended high school and worked as a domestic laborer to support her education. In Willows, she met Hung Man Lee (H.M. Lee), a Korean immigrant who had previously worked in Mexico before moving to the United States. The couple was married on January 1, 1919, at the American Presbyterian Church. Lee and her husband worked as tenant farmers and produce merchants, eventually settling in Los Angeles in 1921. The couple successfully raised three sons: Henry, Allan, and Anthony (Tony).

=== Later life and community work (1940–1995) ===
In their later years, the Lee couple managed apartment buildings in Los Angeles and supported the broader Korean American community in LA. Following H.M. Lee’s death on June 29, 1975, Mary moved to San Francisco. In her 80s, she became a prominent volunteer interpreter at a local Korean senior center, where she spent a decade assisting other immigrants in navigating social services.

=== Publication of Quiet Odyssey and legacy ===
In 1986, Lee began drafting her life story in the form of a 65-page manuscript. Her work caught the attention of historian Sucheng Chan, who recognized the manuscript’s unique value as a rare first-person account of an early 20th-century Korean woman’s life. Through close collaboration with Chan to ensure historical accuracy, Lee expanded the work into Quiet Odyssey: A Pioneer Korean Woman in America, published by the University of Washington Press in 1990.

The book was the first full-length autobiography by a woman of Asian ancestry to cover an entire life from the 1903–1905 immigration wave. Lee’s detailed documentation provides a nuanced narrative of the lives of Asian American women in the pre-1965 era, which is often dominated by male migration stories. Lee died in San Francisco in 1995 at the age of 94.

== Bibliography ==
Chiu, Monica. "Constructing 'Home' in Mary Paik Lee's Quiet Odyssey: A Pioneer Korean Woman in America." Ed. Susan L. Roberson.U of Missouri P, 1998. 121-136. ProQuest. Web. 19 Sep. 2013.

Fujita-Rony, Dorothy. "A Shared Pacific Arena: Empire, Agriculture, and the Life Narratives of Mary Paik Lee, Angeles Monrayo, and Mary Tomita." Frontiers 34.2 (2013): 25,51,272. ProQuest. Web. 18 Sep. 2013.
